= List of football clubs in Morocco =

The following is a complete list of association football clubs based in Morocco. The divisions are correct for the 2026–27 season.

== Botola Pro ==
- AS FAR
- COD Meknès
- DH El-Jadida
- FUS Rabat
- HUS Agadir
- IR Tanger
- KAC Marrakech
- MAS Fez
- MA Tétouan
- Raja CA
- RCA Zemamra
- RS Berkane
- US Amal Tiznit
- UTS Rabat
- WS Témara
- Wydad AC

== Botola Pro 2 ==
- CA Khénifra
- CJ Ben Guerir
- IZ Khemisset
- JS Massira
- JS Soualem
- Kénitra AC
- MC Oujda
- OC Safi
- Olympic Dcheira
- OC Khouribga
- SCC Mohammédia
- Stade Marocain
- USM Oujda
- US Boujaâd
- US Yacoub Mansour
- Wydad Fez

== Amateur National ==
- AJ Sportive
- AS Mansouria
- Chabab Fath Casablanca
- CM El Marsa
- Chabab Houara
- CWW Casablanca
- Ittifaq Marrakech
- Mouloudia Assa
- Olympique Marrakech
- Olympique Youssoufia
- RAC Casablanca
- Raja Beni Mellal
- RC Oued Zem
- USM Aït Melloul
- Wydad Serghini

== Amateurs I ==
=== North ===
- Ajax Tanger
- AS Salé
- CR Al-Hoceima
- DH Khenifra
- Fath Ouislane
- FR Nador
- HL Oujda
- EJS Casablanca
- HA Nador
- Qods Taza
- TS Sale
- US Témara
- Wafa Fez
- WS Driouch

=== South ===
- Adrar Souss
- AJS Boujdour
- Amal Souk Sebt
- AS Essaouira
- CAY Berrechid
- CR Bernoussi
- CUJ Sidi Ifni
- IR Fquih Ben Salah
- JS Kasba Tadla
- Nahdat El Gara
- Najah Souss
- Mouloudia Laayoune
- OC Phosboucraa
- Raja Ben Guerir
- RS El Jadida
- UJS Taroudant

== Amateurs II ==
=== Northeast ===
- AC Belksiri
- AUS Ben Tayeb
- Chabab Alam Tanger
- CS Fnideq
- JO Ouezzane
- Najm Midar
- RS Martil
- RS Zaio
- US Sidi Kacem
- WS Sefrou
- Wydad Tanger

=== Northwest ===
- AR Gharbaoui
- AS Académie Lanoria
- ASO Formation Professionnelle
- CA Nouaceur
- CUS Ben Ahmed
- HSM Khouribga
- JS Deroua
- NS Settat
- RS Settat
- TAS Casablanca
- US Mohammedia

=== South ===
- ACMA Marrakech
- AS Ajiyal El Guerdane
- Chabab Al-Qalaa
- Chabab Lakhiam
- CS Amal Ait Ourir
- CUS Zagora
- Fath Inezgane
- FS Serghini
- Raja Demnat

=== Sahara ===
- Chabab Akhfennir
- Chabab El Ouatia
- Club Foum El-Ouad
- CJ Oued Edahab
- CM Dakhla
- Mouloudia Tarfaya
- Municipale Laayoune
- Najm Tarfaya
- Olympique Guelmim
- Renaissance Tarfaya
- Taawon Jdiriya

== Other Clubs ==
=== Regional League ===
- Chabab Larache
- Club Sakia El Hamra
- HA Sidi Slimane
- HS Ben Slimane
- MC Marrakech
- Raja Al Hoceima
- RS Kenitra
- Wifak Segangan

=== Youth ===
- Mohammed VI Football Academy

== Defunct Clubs ==
- CO Casablanca
- TS Casablanca
- USM Casablanca

== Category ==
- Football clubs in Morocco
- Moroccan football club stubs
