= 2021–22 Moroccan Throne Cup =

Coupe du Trône
Tournament details
- Country: Morocco
- Teams: 64 (from the fourth round onwards)

Final positions
- Champions: RS Berkane (3rd title)
- Runners-up: Raja CA

Tournament statistics
- Matches played: 63
- Goals scored: 144 (2.29 per match)

The 2021–22 Moroccan Throne Cup was the 66th staging of the Moroccan Throne Cup, the main knockout football tournament in Morocco. RS Berkane won the final 1–0 over Raja CA by 1–0 after extra time for their third Throne Cup title.

== Preliminary round ==
=== Qualified teams ===
The following teams competed in the 2021–22 Moroccan Throne Cup Fourth round.

In addition to the 15 teams of 2021–22 Division National

- Widad Temara
- Ittifaq Marrakech
- Wydad Serghini
- Kenitra AC
- Association Al Mansoria
- COD Meknès
- Olympique Youssoufia
- Rachad Bernoussi
- Chabab Mrirt
- JS de Kasbah Tadla
- US Témara
- Fath Nador
- Union Sidi Kacem
- CSM Ouarzazate
- Mouloudia Dakhla

11 teams of 2021–22 Amateur Division I

-North Group

- Fath Casablanca
- Tihad Sale
- Fath Ouislane
- Chabab Rif Al Hoceima
- Difâa Hamrya de Khénifra

-South group

- US Amal Tiznit
- USM Ait Melloul
- Chabab Houara
- Mouloudia Assa
- Jeunesse Sud Boujdour
- Mouloudia Marrakech

4 teams of 2021–22 Amateur Division II

- Union Boujaad (South group)
- Wafa Wydad (Western North group)
- Renaissance Zaio (Eastern North group)
- Nejm Terfaya (Sahara Group)

2 teams of 2021–22 Amateur Division III

- Chabab Alam Tanger (North League - Group B)
- CODER Errachidia (Drâa-Tafilalet League)

=== Fourth round ===
The fourth round was played on 29–30 January 2023.

- North

| Team 1 | Score | Team 2 |
|---|---|---|
| Fath Casablanca | 3–0 | Chabab Alam Tanger |
| Union Sidi Kacem | 0–2 | Tihad Salé |
| Fath Ouislane | 2–1 | Kénitra AC |
| CODER Errachidia | 0–1 | Fath Nador |
| AS Mansouria | 1–1 (4–2 p) | Renaissance Zaio |
| Club Rachad Bernoussi | 1–1 (4–3 p) | Wafa Wydad |
| CR Al Hoceima | 1–4 | US Témara |
| Widad Témara | 2–0 | COD Meknès |

- South

| Team 1 | Score | Team 2 |
|---|---|---|
| Jeunesse Sud Boujdour | 1–1 (2–1 p) | Nejm Terfaya |
| US Amal Tiznit | 4–0 | Mouloudia Dakhla |
| Chabab Houara | 4–3 | Union Boujaad |
| Ittifaq Marrakech | 0–1 | Wydad Serghini |
| Mouloudia Assa | 0–1 | CSM Ouarzazate |
| Chabab Mrirt | 1–1 (1–3 p) | JS de Kasbah Tadla |
| Mouloudia de Marrakech | 0–4 | Olympique Youssoufia |
| Difâa Hamrya de Khénifra | 2–0 | USM Aït-Melloul |

=== Round of 64 ===
The Round of 64 (1/32) matches were played on 5–6 February 2023, the clubs who participed in this stage are the qualified teams from the previous round plus the sixteen club of 2021–22 Botola 2.

- North

| Team 1 | Score | Team 2 |
|---|---|---|
| Fath Casablanca | 3–2 | Tihad Salé |
| Chabab Atlas Khénifra | 1–1 (5–6 p) | US Musulmane d'Oujda |
| Fath Ouislane | 1–2 | AS Sale |
| Fath Nador | 1–0 | AS Mansouria |
| Stade Marocain | 1–0 | Club Rachad Bernoussi |
| Union de Touarga | 2–1 | Wydad de Fès |
| US Témara | 2–2 (3–4 p) | Moghreb Tétouan |
| Widad Témara | 0–1 | Ittihad Khemisset |

- South

| Team 1 | Score | Team 2 |
|---|---|---|
| Jeunesse Sud Boujdour | 1–0 | Kawkab Marrakech |
| US Amal Tiznit | 4–3 | JS Massira |
| Chabab Houara | 2–1 | Wydad Serghini |
| Chabab Ben Guerir | 1–0 | Olympique Dcheira |
| Racing Casablanca | 1–0 | Raja Beni Mellal |
| JS de Kasbah Tadla | 1–0 | Olympique Youssoufia |
| CSM Ouarzazate | 0–1 | Renaissance Zemamra |
| Difâa Hamrya de Khénifra | 0–3 | Tihad Casablanca |

== Final phase ==
=== Qualified teams ===
The following teams competed in the 2021–22 Moroccan Throne Cup.

16 teams of 2021-22 Botola

- AS FAR
- Chabab Mohammédia
- Difaâ El Jadidi
- FUS Rabat
- Hassania Agadir
- IR Tanger
- Maghreb de Fès
- OC Khouribga
- Mouloudia Oujda
- JS Soualem
- Olympic Safi
- Raja Casablanca
- Rapide Oued Zem
- RSB Berkane
- Wydad Casablanca
- Youssoufia Berrechid

10 teams of 2021-22 Botola 2

- Moghreb Tetouan
- Union de Touarga
- Renaissance Zemamra
- AS Sale
- Stade Marocain
- Ittihad Khemisset
- Chabab Ben Guerir
- Racing Casablanca
- US Musulmane d'Oujda
- Tihad Casablanca

2 teams of 2021–22 Division National

- JS de Kasbah Tadla
- Fath Nador

4 teams of 2021–22 Amateur Division I

- Fath Casablanca (North Group)
- US Amal Tiznit (South group)
- Chabab Houara (South group)
- Jeunesse Sud Boujdour (South group)

=== Bracket ===
Draw of the 2021–22 Moroccan Throne Cup final phase

Round of 32
Chabab Houara | 1
Racing Casablanca | 0
Renaissance Zemamra | 3
JS de Kasbah Tadla | 0
OC Khouribga (a.e.t.) | 2
US Amal Tiznit | 1
RS Berkane | 3
Ittihad Khemisset | 0
Union de Touarga | 2 (3)
AS FAR | 2 (5)
Stade Marocain | 2
Fath Nador | 1
US Musulmane d'Oujda | 1 (3)
FUS Rabat | 1 (4)
OC Safi | 2
Jeunesse Sud Boujdour | 1
Tihad Casablanca | 0
Difaâ El Jadidi | 1
Chabab Ben Guerir | 1
Rapide Oued Zem | 0
Maghreb de Fès | 0
IR Tanger | 2
Moghreb Tétouan | 0 (5)
Wydad AC | 0 (6)
Fath Casablanca | 2
AS Sale | 0
SCC Mohammédia | 1
MC Oujda | 0
JS Soualem | 1
Hassania Agadir | 2
Youssoufia Berrechid | 0
Raja CA | 1

Round of 16
Chabab Houara | 2
Renaissance Zemamra | 1
OC Khouribga | 0
RS Berkane | 1
AS FAR | 3
Stade Marocain | 1
FUS Rabat | 0 (4)
OC Safi | 0 (2)
Difaâ El Jadidi (a.e.t.) | 2
Chabab Ben Guerir | 1
IR Tanger | 1 (1)
Wydad AC | 1 (3)
Fath Casablanca | 1
SCC Mohammédia (a.e.t.) | 2
Hassania Agadir | 0 (3)
Raja CA | 0 (5)

Quarter-finals
Chabab Houara | 1
RS Berkane (a.e.t.) | 2
AS FAR | 0
FUS Rabat | 1
Difaâ El Jadidi | 1
Wydad AC | 2
SCC Mohammédia | 1
Raja CA (a.e.t.) | 2

Semi-finals
RS Berkane | 1 (5)
FUS Rabat | 1 (4)
Wydad AC | 0
Raja CA | 1

Final
RS Berkane (a.e.t.) | 1
Raja CA | 0

=== Round of 32 ===
The Round of 32 (1/16) matches were played on 9–10, 16 February and 15 March 2023. the clubs who participed in this stage are the qualified teams from the previous round plus the sixteen club of 2021–22 Botola.

- North

| Team 1 | Score | Team 2 |
|---|---|---|
| US Musulmane d'Oujda | 1–1 (3–4 p) | FUS Rabat |
| SCC Mohammédia | 1–0 | MC Oujda |
| Fath Casablanca | 2–0 | AS Sale |
| Stade Marocain | 2–1 | Fath Nador |
| Moghreb Tétouan | 0–0 (5–6 p) | Wydad AC |
| Union de Touarga | 2–2 (3-5 p) | AS FAR |
| RS Berkane | 3–0 | Ittihad Khemisset |
| Maghreb de Fès | 0–2 | IR Tanger |

- South

| Team 1 | Score | Team 2 |
|---|---|---|
| Renaissance Zemamra | 3–0 | JS de Kasbah Tadla |
| OC Safi | 2–1 | Jeunesse Sud Boujdour |
| Youssoufia Berrechid | 0–1 | Raja CA |
| Chabab Houara | 1–0 | Racing Casablanca |
| JS Soualem | 1–2 | Hassania Agadir |
| OC Khouribga | 2–1 (a.e.t.) | US Amal Tiznit |
| Chabab Ben Guerir | 1–0 | Rapide Oued Zem |
| Tihad Casablanca | 0–1 | Difaâ El Jadidi |

=== Round of 16 ===
The draw was held on 16 March 2023, the first team drawn played at home. A total of eight games were played on 26, 28, 31 March and 12 April 2023.

| Team 1 | Score | Team 2 |
|---|---|---|
| FUS Rabat | 0–0 (4–2 p) | OC Safi |
| Difaâ El Jadidi | 2–1 (a.e.t.) | Chabab Ben Guerir |
| Chabab Houara | 2–1 | Renaissance Zemamra |
| Fath Casablanca | 1–2 (a.e.t.) | SCC Mohammédia |
| AS FAR | 3–1 | Stade Marocain |
| Hassania Agadir | 0–0 (3–5 p) | Raja CA |
| IR Tanger | 1–1 (1–3 p) | Wydad AC |
| OC Khouribga | 0–1 | RS Berkane |

=== Quarter-finals ===
The quarter-final matches were played on 13–14, 24 May 2023.

| Team 1 | Score | Team 2 |
|---|---|---|
| AS FAR | 0–1 | FUS Rabat |
| Chabab Houara | 1–2 (a.e.t.) | RS Berkane |
| SCC Mohammédia | 1–2 (a.e.t.) | Raja CA |
| Difaâ El Jadidi | 1–2 | Wydad AC |

=== Semi-finals ===
Semi-final matches were played on 9 July 2023 at a neutral venue.

| Team 1 | Score | Team 2 |
|---|---|---|
| RS Berkane | 1–1 (5–4 p) | FUS Rabat |
| Wydad AC | 0–1 | Raja CA |

9 July 2023
18:00 UTC+1

| Wydad AC | 0–1 | Raja CA |
|---|---|---|
| | Report | 18' (o.g.) Zola |

Stade Mohammed V, Casablanca
Referee: Jalal Jayed

9 July 2023
21:00 UTC+1

| RS Berkane | 1–1 (a.e.t.) | FUS Rabat |
|---|---|---|
| Zghoudi 2' | Report | 90+7' Louadni |
Penalties
| El Moussaoui (penalty missed); El Bahri (penalty scored); El Fahli (penalty scored); Dayo (penalty missed); Bentarcha (penalty scored); Regragui (penalty scored) | 5–4 | (penalty scored) Karnass; (penalty scored) Kerboub; (penalty missed) Azri; (penalty scored) Louadni; (penalty missed) Elaz; (penalty scored) Hannouri; (penalty missed) Qasmi |

Fes Stadium, Fes
Referee: Redouane Jiyed

=== Final ===
15 July 2023
20:00 UTC+1

| RS Berkane | 1–0 (a.e.t.) | Raja CA |
|---|---|---|
| Dayo 105+3' (pen.) | Report |

Prince Moulay Abdellah Stadium, Rabat
Attendance: 45,000
Referee: Yassine Bouslim
