= 2020–21 Moroccan Throne Cup =

Coupe du Trône
Tournament details
- Country: Morocco
- Teams: 64 (from the third round onwards)

Final positions
- Champions: RS Berkane (2nd title)
- Runners-up: Wydad AC

Tournament statistics
- Matches played: 63
- Goals scored: 171 (2.71 per match)

The 2020–21 Moroccan Throne Cup was the 65th staging of the Moroccan Throne Cup, the main knockout football tournament in Morocco.

RS Berkane won the final 3–2 over Wydad AC on penalties following a 0–0 draw after extra time for their second Thron Cup title.

== Preliminary round ==
=== Third round ===
The fourth round was played on 23–24 February 2022.

Team 1	Score	Team 2
JS Massira	3–1	Club Stars Aousserd
Chabab Houara	2–2 (2–4 p)	US Amal Tiznit
US Musulmane d'Oujda	1–2	ASC Sidi Lahcen
CS Ouarzazate	1–0	Hilal Tarrast
JS de Kasbah Tadla'	0–0 (5–4 p)	Olympique Youssoufia
Wydad Serghini	9–0	CM El Ouatia
US Témara	1–0	COD Meknès
Association Al Mansoria	1–0	Étoile de Casablanca
Fath Casablanca	4–0	Chabab Mrirt
Tihad Salé	2–2 (5–6 p)	Union Sidi Kacem
Mouloudia Dakhla	3–1	Chabab Sakia Hamra
Wafaa Riadi Fassi	2–3	Fath Nador
Ittifaq Marrakech	2–1	Najah Souss
Nassma Settat	3–4	Rachad Bernoussi
US Bejaad	0–1	Amal Souk Sebt
CR Al Hoceima	0–1	US Aknol

=== Fourth round ===
The fourth round was played on 2–3 March 2022.

Team 1	Score	Team 2
Association Al Mansoria	2–0	Kénitra AC
CA Khénifra	2–1	Rachad Bernoussi
Ittifaq Marrakech	3–1	Racing Casablanca
Mouloudia Dakhla	1–1 (2–4 p)	JS Soualem
JS Massira	2–1	CJ Ben Guerir
Olympic Dcheira	1–3	Tihad Casablanca
Wydad Serghini	0–2	Raja Beni Mellal
Stade Marocain	1–1 (1–3 p)	Union de Touarga
Union Sidi Kacem	1–0	Widad Témara
AS Salé	0–0 (1–4 p)	US Témara
IZ Khemisset	4–1	US Aknol
Wydad Fès	4–0	ASC Sidi Lahcen
Fath Nador	2–2 (3–4 p)	Fath Casablanca
US Amal Tiznit	2–1	CS Ouarzazate
Kawkab Marrakech	2–1	Amal Souk Sebt
Olympique Khouribga	1–1 (4–5 p)	JS de Kasbah Tadla

== Final phase ==
=== Qualified teams ===
The following teams competed in the 2020–21 Moroccan Throne Cup.

16 teams of 2020–21 Botola

- AS FAR
- Chabab Mohammédia
- Difaâ El Jadidi
- FUS Rabat
- Hassania Agadir
- IR Tanger
- Maghreb de Fès
- Moghreb Tétouan
- Mouloudia Oujda
- Nahdat Zemamra
- Olympic Safi
- Raja Casablanca
- Rapide Oued Zem
- RSB Berkane
- Wydad Casablanca
- Youssoufia Berrechid

8 teams of 2020–21 Botola 2

- Chabab Atlas Khénifra
- Jeunesse Sportive Soualem
- Ittihad Khemisset
- Kawkab Marrakech
- Raja Beni Mellal
- Tihad Casablanca
- Union de Touarga
- Wydad de Fès

5 teams of 2020–21 Division National

- Association Al Mansoria
- JS de Kasbah Tadla
- JS Massira
- Union Sidi Kacem
- US Témara

2 teams of 2020–21 Amateur Division I

- Fath Casablanca (North Group)
- Ittifaq Marrakech (South group)

1 team of 2020–21 Amateur Division II

- US Amal Tiznit (South group)

=== Bracket ===
Draw of the 2020–21 Moroccan Throne Cup final phase

Round of 32
Ittifaq Marrakech	1
Wydad Casablanca	4
Union Sidi Kacem	0
SCC Mohammédia (a.e.t.)	1
JS Massira	1
Raja Beni Mellal (a.e.t.)	2
JS de Kasbah Tadla	0
Raja Casablanca (a.e.t.)	1
Nahdat Zemamra	0
Hassania Agadir (a.e.t.)	1
FUS Rabat	1 (5)
Wydad de Fès	1 (4)
Ittihad Khemisset	0
Chabab Atlas Khénifra	3
US Témara	0
Union de Touarga	2
Association Al Mansoria	0 (5)
Moghreb Tétouan	0 (3)
IR Tanger	1
Fath Casablanca	0
Rapide Oued Zem	1
Difaâ El Jadidi	3
RS Berkane (a.e.t.)	2
Mouloudia Oujda	1
AS FAR	0
Maghreb de Fès	2
Olympic Safi	4
US Amal Tiznit	1
JS Soualem	2
Tihad Casablanca	1
Youssoufia Berrechid	1
Kawkab Marrakech	0

Round of 16
Wydad Casablanca	3
SCC Mohammédia	2
Raja Beni Mellal	3 (2)
Raja Casablanca	3 (4)
Hassania Agadir	1
FUS Rabat	3
Chabab Atlas Khénifra	1
Union de Touarga	2
Association Al Mansoria	1
IR Tanger	0
Difaâ El Jadidi	0 (2)
RS Berkane	0 (4)
Maghreb de Fès	3
Olympic Safi	1
JS Soualem	1
Youssoufia Berrechid	2

Quarter-finals
Wydad Casablanca	2
Raja Casablanca	0
FUS Rabat	3
Union de Touarga	1
Association Al Mansoria	0
RS Berkane	1
Maghreb de Fès	0
Youssoufia Berrechid	2

Semi-finals
Wydad Casablanca	0 (5)
FUS Rabat	0 (4)
RS Berkane	2 (4)
Youssoufia Berrechid	2 (3)

Final
Wydad AC	0 (2)
RS Berkane	0 (3)

=== Round of 32 ===
Draw of the 2020–21 Moroccan Throne Cup round of 32

The Round of 32 matches were played on 11–13 March, and 5–6 April 2022.

Team 1	Score	Team 2
US Témara	0–2	Union de Touarga
RS Berkane	2–1 (a.e.t.)	Mouloudia Oujda
Union Sidi Kacem	0–1 (a.e.t.)	Chabab Mohammédia
Ittihad Khemisset	0–3	Chabab Atlas Khénifra
FUS Rabat	1–1 (5–4 p)	Wydad de Fès
AS FAR	0–2	Maghreb de Fès
Association Al Mansoria	0–0 (5–3 p)	Moghreb Tétouan
IR Tanger	1–0	Fath Casablanca
Youssoufia Berrechid	1–0	Kawkab Marrakech
JS de Kasbah Tadla	0–1 (a.e.t.)	Raja Casablanca
Nahdat Zemamra	0–1 (a.e.t.)	Hassania Agadir
Jeunesse Sportive Soualem	2–1	Tihad Casablanca
Olympic Safi	4–1	US Amal Tiznit
JS Massira	1–2 (a.e.t.)	Raja Beni Mellal
Rapide Oued Zem	1–3	Difaâ El Jadidi
Ittifaq Marrakech	1–4	Wydad Casablanca

=== Round of 16 ===
The Round of 16 matches were played on 18–21 March, and 9–10 April 2022.

Team 1	Score	Team 2
Chabab Atlas Khénifra	1–2	Union de Touarga
Maghreb de Fès	3–1	Olympic Safi
Difaâ El Jadidi	0–0 (2–4 p)	RS Berkane
Raja Beni Mellal	3–3 (2–4 p)	Raja CA
Hassania Agadir	1–3	FUS Rabat
Wydad AC	3–2	Chabab Mohammédia
Association Al Mansoria	1–0	IR Tanger
Jeunesse Sportive Soualem	1–2	Youssoufia Berrechid

=== Quarter-finals ===
The Quarter-finals matches were played on 28–29 May, and 7 July 2022.

Team 1	Score	Team 2
FUS Rabat	3–1	Union de Touarga
Maghreb de Fès	0–2	Youssoufia Berrechid
Association Al Mansoria	0–1	RS Berkane
Wydad AC	2–0	Raja CA

=== Semifinals ===
The Semifinals matches will be played on 19-20 July 2022 at the Fez Stadium.

Team 1	Score	Team 2
RS Berkane	2–2 (4–3 p)	Youssoufia Berrechid
Wydad AC	0–0 (5–4 p)	FUS Rabat

=== Final ===
28 July 2022
20:00 UTC+1

Wydad AC	0–0 (a.e.t.)	RS Berkane
	Report
Penalties
Zouhair El Moutaraji (penalty missed); Yahia Attiyat Allah (penalty missed); Juvhel Tsoumou (penalty scored); Ayoub El Amloud (penalty scored); Ayman El Hassouni (penalty missed)	2–3	(penalty scored) Hamza El Moussaoui; (penalty scored) Larbi Naji; (penalty missed) Youssef El Fahli; (penalty scored) Sofian El Moudane

Prince Moulay Abdellah Stadium, Rabat
Referee: Redouane Jiyed
