= 2023–24 Moroccan Throne Cup =

Coupe du Trône
Tournament details
- Country: Morocco
- Teams: 64 (from the third round onwards)

Final positions
- Champions: OC Safi (1st title)
- Runners-up: RS Berkane

Tournament statistics
- Matches played: 63
- Goals scored: 162 (2.57 per match)

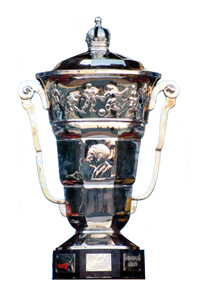

The 2023–24 Moroccan Throne Cup was the 68th staging of the Moroccan Throne Cup, the main knockout football tournament in Morocco.

== Preliminary round ==
=== Third round ===
Result of the draw for the 3rd round of the Throne Cup qualifiers, 2023-2024 season
The third round were played on 1–4 February 2025.

- North
  Team 1	Score	Team 2
  Fath Casablanca	3–0	AJS Ras Ijerri
  Wydad Sportive de Sefrou	1–3	HA Nador
  Kénitra AC	1–0	Hassania Lazaret Oujda
  Association Jeunesse Sportive	3–1	US Témara
  Étoile de Casablanca	2–1	WS Témara
  IZ Khemisset	2–1	Fath Riadi de Nador
  Widad Juventud Tanger	2–3	US Sidi Kacem
- South
  Team 1	Score	Team 2
  Tihad AS	1–0	US Yacoub El Mansour
  Mouloudiat Assa	0–2	Olympique Marrakech
  US Amal Tiznit	0–2	CR Bernoussi
  Najm de Marrakech	2–1	Association Al Mansoria
  Union Aguelmous	0–3	Ittihad Riadi Fkih Ben Salah
  Wydad Serghini	1–0	Najah Souss
  Olympique Youssoufia	4–1	Fath Sidi Bennour
- Sahara
  Team 1	Score	Team 2
  Chabab Sakia Hamra	0–3	CJ Ouatia
  CO Laayoune	1–3	AJS Boujdour

=== Fourth round ===
Result of the draw for the 4th round of the Throne Cup qualifiers, 2023-2024 season
The fourth round were played on 26 February and 2 March 2025.

- North
  Team 1	Score	Team 2
  Raja Beni Mellal	2–0	Étoile de Casablanca
  IZ Khemisset	4–1	CR Bernoussi
  Kénitra AC	1–2	Racing Casablanca
  US Sidi Kacem	1–0	Wydad de Fès
  Stade Marocain	2–0	AS Sale
  US Musulmane d'Oujda	2–2 (5–3 p)	Chabab Atlas Khénifra
  Tihad AS	1–0	Fath Casablanca
  COD Meknès	0–0 (1–4 p)	HA Nador
- South
  Team 1	Score	Team 2
  Najm de Marrakech	2–3	IR Fkih Ben Salah
  Olympique Dcheira	1–1 (3–4 p)	KAC Marrakech
  JS Massira	0–2	Chabab Ben Guerir
  Association Jeunesse Sportive	1–0	RC Oued Zem
  CJ Ouatia	0–3	OC Khouribga
  Wydad Serghini	1–0	Ittifaq Marrakech
  AJS Boujdour	1–0	Olympique Marrakech
  Difaâ El Jadidi	4 – 1	Olympique Youssoufia

== Final phase ==
=== Qualified teams ===
The following teams competed in the 2023–24 Moroccan Throne Cup.

16 teams of 2023-24 Botola

- AS FAR
- Chabab Mohammédia
- FUS Rabat
- Hassania Agadir
- IR Tanger
- JS Soualem
- Maghreb de Fès
- Moghreb Tetouan
- Mouloudia Oujda
- Olympic Safi
- Raja Casablanca
- RCA Zemamra
- RSB Berkane
- Union de Touarga
- Wydad Casablanca
- Youssoufia Berrechid

8 teams of 2023-24 Botola 2

- US Musulmane d'Oujda
- Difaâ El Jadidi
- KAC Marrakech
- Stade Marocain
- Raja Beni Mellal
- OC Khouribga
- Chabab Ben Guerir
- Racing Casablanca

4 teams of 2023–24 Division National

- Wydad Serghini
- IZ Khemisset
- Tihad AS
- US Sidi Kacem

3 teams of 2023–24 Amateur Division I

- AJS Boujdour (South group)
- HA Nador (North Group)
- Association Jeunesse Sportive (North Group)

1 team of 2023–24 Amateur Division II

- Ittihad Riadi Fkih Ben Salah (Northwest Group)

=== Road to Final ===
Draw of the 2023–24 Moroccan Throne Cup final phase

Round of 32
IZ Khemisset	0
MA Tétouan	1
Wydad AC	1
Fath US	0
OC Khouribga	3
IR Fkih Ben Salah	0
AJS Boujdour	0
HUS Agadir	3
AS FAR	2
Maghreb AS	1
RCA Zemamra	4
DH El Jadidi	0
KAC Marrakech	2
Racing Casablanca	0
IR Tanger	0
RS Berkane	1
MC Oujda	1
Tihad AS	2
SCC Mohammédia	2
US Touarga	6
CAY Berrechid	2
Wydad Serghini	1
Stade Marocain	2
US Sidi Kacem	0
Chabab Ben Guerir	1
JS Soualem (a.e.t.)	3
OC Safi	3
AJS	1
HA Nador	1
USM Oujda	3
Raja CA	4
Raja Beni Mellal	2

Round of 16
MA Tétouan	1
Wydad AC	0
OC Khouribga	2
HUS Agadir	1
AS FAR	3
RCA Zemamra	0
KAC Marrakech	0
RS Berkane	3
Tihad AS	0
US Touarga	2
CAY Berrechid	0
Stade Marocain	1
JS Soualem	1 (4)
OC Safi	1 (5)
USM Oujda (a.e.t.)	2
Raja CA	1

Quarter-finals
MA Tétouan	1
OC Khouribga	0
AS FAR	1 (6)
RS Berkane	1 (7)
Union de Touarga	1
Stade Marocain	0
OC Safi	2
US Musulmane d'Oujda	1

Semi-finals
MA Tétouan	0
RS Berkane	3
US Touarga	0
OC Safi	1

Final
RS Berkane	1 (5)
OC Safi	1 (6)

=== Round of 32 ===
The Round of 32 (1/16) matches were played between 26 and 30 March 2025. the clubs who participed in this stage are the qualified teams from the previous round plus the sixteen club of 2023–24 Botola.

- North

Team 1	Score	Team 2
Wydad AC	1–0	Fath US
IZ Khemisset	0–1	MA Tétouan
Stade Marocain	2–0	US Sidi Kacem
IR Tanger	0–1	RS Berkane
HA Nador	1–3	USM Oujda
AS FAR	2–1	Maghreb AS
SCC Mohammédia	2–6	US Touarga
MC Oujda	1–2	Tihad AS

- South

Team 1	Score	Team 2
Raja CA	4–2	Raja Beni Mellal
OC Khouribga	3–0	IR Fkih Ben Salah
OC Safi	3–1	Association Jeunesse Sportive
RCA Zemamra	4–0	DH El Jadidi
CAY Berrechid	2–1	Wydad Serghini
KAC Marrakech	2–0	Racing Casablanca
AJS Boujdour	0–3	HUS Agadir
Chabab Ben Guerir	1–3 (a.e.t.)	JS Soualem

=== Round of 16 ===
A total of eight games were played on 5–6 April, 21 May and 1 June 2025.

Team 1	Score	Team 2
MA Tétouan	1–0	Wydad AC
OC Khouribga	2–1	HUS Agadir
AS FAR	3–0	RCA Zemamra
KAC Marrakech	0–3	RS Berkane
Tihad AS	0–2	US Touarga
CAY Berrechid	0–1	Stade Marocain
JS Soualem	1–1 (4–5 p)	OC Safi
USM Oujda	2–1 (a.e.t.)	Raja CA

=== Quarter-finals ===
The quarter-final matches were played on 14–15 June 2025.

Team 1	Score	Team 2
MA Tétouan	1–0	OC Khouribga
AS FAR	1–1 (6–7 p)	RS Berkane
US Touarga	1–0	Stade Marocain
OC Safi	2–1	USM Oujda

=== Semi-finals ===
The semi-final matches were played on 21–22 June 2025.

Team 1	Score	Team 2
MA Tétouan	0–3	RS Berkane
US Touarga	0–1	OC Safi

== Final ==
29 June 2025
19:00 UTC+1

RS Berkane	1–1 (a.e.t.)	OC Safi
Dayo 45+5' (pen.)	Report	Errahouli 39'
Penalties
Dayo (penalty scored); Riahi (penalty missed); El Moussaoui (penalty scored); El Morabit (penalty scored); Santos (penalty scored); Zghoudi (penalty scored); Assal (penalty missed)	5–6	Diarra (penalty scored); Michte (penalty missed); Karmoune (penalty scored); Kordani (penalty scored); Morsli (penalty scored); Yechou (penalty scored); Habti (penalty scored)

Fez Stadium, Fez
Referee: Jalal Jayed

== See also ==
- 2024–25 Botola
- 2024–25 Excellence Cup
- 2024–25 CAF Confederation Cup
