= 2007–08 Moroccan Throne Cup =

Tournament details
- Country: Morocco

Final positions
- Champions: FAR de Rabat (10th title)

The 2007–08 season of the Moroccan Throne Cup was the 52nd edition of the Cup. It started on 28 October 2007.

The cup was won by FAR de Rabat, who beat Maghreb de Fès in the final.

== 3rd Round ==
Date	Team 1	Team 2	Result
8 December 2007	CS Nouasseur (D4)	Fath Casablanca (D4)	1–0
8 December 2007	Olympique Casablanca (D3)	Wafa Sidi Moumen (D3)	1–2
8 December 2007	Anouar Casa (D3)	OFPPT Professionnelle (D3)	0–6
8 December 2007	Ennajah Riadi Madiouna (D4)	Ahram de Casablanca (D4)	3–4 (pens)
8 December 2007	Amal Belksiri (D3)	Olympique Youssoufia (D3)	5–4 (pens)
8 December 2007	Stade Marocain (D3)	AS Ministère de la Justice (D4)	2–0
8 December 2007	US Lionceaux de l'Aire (D4)	Chabab Sportif de Skhirat (D4)	Forfait USLA
8 December 2007	Rachad Salaoui (D4)	Association Mansouria (D3)	0–1
8 December 2007	Wydad de Fès (D3)	AS Taza (D3)	1–0
8 December 2007	Mouloudia Missour (D4)	Renaissance de Tissa (D4)	5–6 (pens)
8 December 2007	Tihad Riadi Chefchaouni (D4)	Chabab Ben Dibane (D4)	3–2
8 December 2007	Atletico de Tanger (D3)	Club Étudiants de Tétouan (D4)	1–3
8 December 2007	Olympique Kasri (D4)	Renaissance Sportive Martil (D3)	3–5 (pens)
8 December 2007	Fath de Nador (D4)	Renaissance de Berkane (D3)	5–6 (pens)
8 December 2007	Mouloudia El Aioun (D3)	Raja Al Hoceima (D3)	2–0
8 December 2007	Chabab Dariouch (D3)	US Musulman Oujda (D3)	5–4 (pens)
9 December 2007	Chabab Aklim (D4)	Renaissance d'Oujda (D4)	5–4 (pens)
9 December 2007	FC Cheminot Meknès (D4)	Ismailia Meknès (D4)	3–0
9 December 2007	Club Chabab M'rirt (D3)	US Ain Taoujdate (D3)	3–5 (pens)
9 December 2007	Wifaq Tinejdad (D4)	Amal Azrou (D3)	0–1
9 December 2007	Ittihad Riadi Fkih Ben Salah (D3)	Itihad Azilal (D4)	4–3
9 December 2007	Amal Souk Essabt (D3)	Raja de Beni Mellal (D3)	4–3 (pens)
9 December 2007	Amal Sidi Bennour (D4)	Olympique Youssoufia (D3)	1–3
9 December 2007	Jeunesse Sportive Shimi (D4)	Club Khmiss Zemamra (D4)	1–3 (pens)
9 December 2007	Chez Ali Marrakech (D3)	Mouloudia de Marrakech (D4)	1–2
9 December 2007	Hassania Agdaz (D4)	Club Ouarzazate (D4)	0–3
9 December 2007	Union Inzegane (D3)	Raja d'Agadir (D3)	2–0
9 December 2007	Chabab Lkhiyam (D3)	Union Aït Melloul (D3)	1–2
9 December 2007	AS Chabab Tikiouine (D4)	Union Taroudant (D3)	2–1
9 December 2007	Mouloudia Dakhla (D4)	Mouloudia de Laâyoune (D3)	0–1
9 December 2007	Manar Boujdour (D4)	Nahda de Tan-Tan (D3)	Forfait NSTT
9 December 2007	Renaissance de Tarfaya (D4)	Chabab Akhfnir (D4)	5–6 (pens)

== 4th Round ==
Date	Team 1	Team 2	Result
6 January 2008	Union Inzegane (D3)	AS Chabab Tikiouine (D4)	4–1
6 January 2008	Chabab Akhfnir (D4)	Union Aït Melloul (D3)	0–2
6 January 2008	Club Ouarzazate (D4)	Mouloudia de Marrakech (D4)	1–0
6 January 2008	CS Nouasseur (D4)	OFPPT Professionnelle (D3)	1–3
6 January 2008	Wafa Sidi Moumen (D3)	Ahram de Casablanca (D4)	1–0
6 January 2008	Association Mansouria (D3)	Stade Marocain (D3)	6–5 (pens)
6 January 2008	Manar Boujdour (D4)	Mouloudia de Laâyoune (D3)	3–4 (pens)
6 January 2008	Renaissance de Berkane (D3)	Chabab Aklim (D4)	3–0
6 January 2008	Chabab Dariouch (D3)	Mouloudia El Aioun (D3)	1–2
6 January 2008	Tihad Riadi Chefchaouni (D4)	US Ain Taoujdate (D3)	5–2
6 January 2008	Amal Azrou (D3)	Ismailia Meknès (D4)	2–1
6 January 2008	Club Étudiants de Tétouan (D4)	Renaissance Martil (D3)	1–2
6 January 2008	Club Khmiss Zemamra (D4)	Olympique Youssoufia (D3)	3–1
6 January 2008	Amal Souk Essabt (D3)	Ittihad Riadi Fkih Ben Salah (D3)	1–0
6 January 2008	Renaissance de Tissa	Wydad de Fès (D3)	0–2
6 January 2008	Chabab Sportif de Skhirat (D4)	Amal Belksiri (D3)	2–0

== 5th Round ==
This round saw the entry of clubs from GNF 2

Date	Team 1	Team 2	Result
3 February 2008	Renaissance de Settat (D2)	Union Inzegane (D3)	0–1
3 February 2008	Union Aït Melloul (D3)	Amal Souk Essabt (D3)	0–1
3 February 2008	Mouloudia de Laâyoune (D3)	Club Ouarzazate (D4)	1–0
3 February 2008	Club Khmiss Zemamra (D4)	Chabab Houara (D2)	0–4
3 February 2008	Wafa Wydad (D2)	OFPPT Professionnelle (D3)	0–1
3 February 2008	Rachad Bernoussi (D2)	TAS de Casablanca (D2)	1–0
3 February 2008	Association Mansouria (D3)	Chabab Mohammédia (D2)	2–1
3 February 2008	Racing de Casablanca (D2)	Union de Mohammédia (D2)	0–1
3 February 2008	Youssoufia Berrechid (D2)	Wafa Sidi Moumen (D3)	0–1
3 February 2008	Renaissance Martil (D3)	Wydad de Fès (D3)	1–2
3 February 2008	Union de Touarga (D2)	Tihad Témara (D2)	0–1
3 February 2008	Ittihad Tanger (D2)	Chabab Rif Hoceima (D2)	2–0
3 February 2008	Tihad Riadi Chefchaouni (D4)	Renaissance de Berkane (D3)	1–2
3 February 2008	Hilal de Nador (D2)	Mouloudia El Aioun (D3)	2–0
3 February 2008	Union de Sidi Kacem (D2)	Chabab Sportif de Skhirat (D4)	2–0
3 February 2008	Amal Azrou (D3)	AS Salé (D2)	0–0 (2–4 pens)

== Last 32 ==
This round saw the entry of clubs from the Botola. The round took place on 20 February 2008.

Date	Team 1	Team 2	Result	Scorers
1 March 2008	Maghreb de Fès (D1)	Ittihad de Tanger (D2)	1–1 (4–3 pens)	Imad Ait Azza 86' / Adnane Mestitaf 34'
1 March 2008	Raja de Casablanca (D1)	Olympic Club de Safi (D1)	3–3 (4–2 pens)	Doghmi 45' ; Dia 61' ; Amrani 118' / Landré 50' ; Lansri 90', Lansri 115'
1 March 2008	Hassania d'Agadir (D1)	Amal Souk Essabt (D3)	1–0	Abdou Fal 83'
1 March 2008	Renaissance de Berkane (D3)	Moghreb Tétouan (D1)	0–1	
1 March 2008	Fath Union Sport (D1)	Union de Sidi Kacem (D2)	0–1	
2 March 2008	Difaâ Hassani El Jadidi (D1)	Union Mohammédia (D2)	1–0	Nabil Mesloub 77'
2 March 2008	Wydad de Fès (D3)	CODM de Meknès (D1)	1–0	Fakherdinne Gherbaoui 107'
2 March 2008	Union Inzegane (D3)	Chabab Houara (D2)	0–3	Ali Ameafoun 32' ; Mohamed Jebrane 89'
2 March 2008	AS Salé (D2)	AS Mansouria (D3)	3–2	Mohamed Jaouad 9' ; Mohamed Zouidi 74' ; Abdessamad Bouzidi 89' / Amzil 54' ; Adnane 69'
2 March 2008	KAC Kénitra (D1)	Ittihad Khemisset (D1)	1–1 (2–1 pens)	Reggadi 24' / Fahim 32'
2 March 2008	Mouloudia d'Oujda (D1)	Hilal de Nador (D2)	3–3 (1–3 pens)	Khalid Lebhij 25', 61' ; Réda Kribib 96' / Mazari Abdelouahed 77' ; Ahmadouch Mimoun 89' ; Abjouma Nabil 115'
2 March 2008	Wafa Sidi Moumen (D3)	OFPPT Professionnelle (D3)	1–1 (4–3 pens)	
2 March 2008	JS Massira (D1)	Kawkab Marrakech (D1)	1–1 (3–4 pens)	Mohamed Benhalib 105' / Wissam Baraka 118'
5 March 2008	US Témara (D2)	FAR de Rabat (D1)	0–1	Mssassi 103'
26 March 2008	Olympique de Khouribga (D1)	Rachad Bernoussi (D2)	2–1	
2 April 2008	Mouloudia de Laâyoune (D3)	Wydad AC (D1)	0–3	Bidodane 50', 67' ; Redouane Jaouhari 87'

== Last 16 ==
The draw took place on 27 March 2008.

Date	Team 1	Team 2	Result	Scorers
5 April 2008	Raja de Casablanca (D1)	Kawkab Marrakech (D1)	2–1	Omar Nejjari 89' ; Metouali 101' / Wissam Baraka 90+2'
5 April 2008	KAC Kénitra (D1)	Hilal de Nador (D2)	3–0	Diang 16' ; Reggadi 19', 56'
5 April 2008	Union de Sidi Kacem (D2)	Moghreb Tétouan (D1)	0–1	Madihi 26'
5 April 2008	AS Salé (D2)	FAR de Rabat (D1)	0–1	Bendriss 84' (pen.)
6 April 2008	Maghreb de Fès (D1)	Wydad de Fès (D3)	1–0	Youssef Abouda 21'
6 April 2008	Chabab Houara (D2)	Wydad AC (D1)	3–1	Hassan Ouchrif 23', 47' ; Rachid Raghni 57' / Doulyazal 79' (pen.)
6 April 2008	Hassania d'Agadir (D1)	Difaâ Hassani El Jadidi (D1)	1–2	Hicham Allouli 58' / Abdellah Lehwa 29' ; Adil Sassa 119'
14 May 2008	Olympique de Khouribga (D1)	Wafa Sidi Moumen (D3)	5–0	Mohamed Najmi 11' (pen.) ; Baqlal 32' ; Rassou 34', 73' ; Jamal Triki 57'

== Quarter-finals ==
The draw took place on 22 April 2008.

Date	Team 1	Team 2	Result	Scorers
10 May 2008	Moghreb Tétouan (D1)	Raja de Casablanca (D1)	1–0	Madihi 65'
11 May 2008	KAC Kénitra (D1)	FAR de Rabat (D1)	0–0 (10–11 pens)	
24 May 2008	Chabab Houara (D2)	Maghreb de Fès (D1)	0–1	Boubacar Sidiké Koné 51'
31 May 2008	Difaâ Hassani El Jadidi (D1)	Olympique de Khouribga (D1)	1–1 (4–5 pens)	Lahoua 62' / Samir Fallah 88'

== Semi-finals ==
The draw took place on 22 April 2008. The semi-finals took place at the El Harti Stadium in Marrakesh.

Date	Team 1	Team 2	Result	Buteurs
14 June 2008	Moghreb Tétouan (D1)	Maghreb de Fès (D1)	1–2	Madihi 24' (pen.) / Abdelkrim Benhniya 15', 19'
14 June 2008	FAR de Rabat (D1)	Olympique de Khouribga (D1)	1–0	Mustapha Allaoui 55'

== Final ==
Teams
FAR de Rabat - Maghreb de Fès
Score
1–0
Date
26 July 2008
Stadium
17h00 - Prince Moulay Abdellah Stadium, Rabat
Referee
Said Tahiri
Goals
Jawad Ouaddouch 95
FAR de Rabat
12- El Jarmouni, 2- Fellah, 4- Ouchela, 5- Mssassi (8- El Mrini 75), 7- Kaddioui, 14- El Basri, 18- Kacemi, 19- Bendriss, 21- Allaoui, 23- Kabli (11- Erraki 83e), 24- Ouaddouch (29- Akadar 96)
Maghreb de Fès
Ait Boulemane, Dahmani (Kherazi 55), Mrani, Boubacar, Abouda, Daoudi, Hajji, Bassam, Benhania (Lahrari 82), Maghraoui, Noussir (Baqqali 103)
Yellow cards
Maghreb de Fès : Mustapha Mrani (89)

FAR de Rabat : Issam Erraki (110)

== Number of teams by division by round ==
Division	3rd round (32 matches)	4th round (16 matches)	5th round (16 matches)	Last 32	Last 16	Quarter finals	Semi- finals	Final
Botola; 16 clubs	Byes			16	10	7	4	2
GNF 2; 16 clubs	Byes		16	8	4	1		
GNFA 1; 56 clubs	32	19	12	8	2			
GNFA 2; 80 clubs	32	13	4					

== See also ==
- 2007–08 Botola
