= 2022–23 Moroccan Throne Cup =

Coupe du Trône
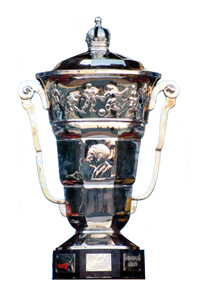
- Moroccan Coupe du Trône

Tournament details
- Country: Morocco
- Teams: 64 (from the third round onwards)

Final positions
- Champions: Raja CA (9th title)
- Runners-up: AS FAR

Tournament statistics
- Matches played: 63
- Goals scored: 172 (2.73 per match)

The 2022–23 Moroccan Throne Cup was the 67th staging of the Moroccan Throne Cup, the main knockout football tournament in Morocco. Raja CA won the final 2–1 over AS FAR for their ninth Throne Cup title.

== Preliminary round ==
=== First round ===
The first round were played on 3–5 February 2024.
First round program
First round results

=== Second round ===
The first round were played on 21–22 February 2024.
Second round results

=== Third round ===
The third round were played on 6–7 March 2024.

- North
  Team 1	Score	Team 2
  TAS de Casablanca	1–0	COD Meknès
  Union Aguelmous	0–2	US Sidi Kacem
  Hassania Lazaret Oujda	1–4	Wydad Sportive de Sefrou
  US Témara	1–2	Fath Riadi de Nador
  Kénitra AC	4–1	Étoile de Casablanca
  Fath Casablanca	3–0	Difâa Hamrya de Khénifra
  CS Ajax Tanger	3–1	CR Bernoussi
  US Yacoub El Mansour	1–2	Qods Taza
- South
  Team 1	Score	Team 2
  Olympique Youssoufia	0–2	US Amal Tiznit
  Ittihad Riadi Fkih Ben Salah	1–1 (4–3 p)	Club Hassania Khouribga
  Association Al Mansoria	2–0	CSM Ouarzazate
  Inter Mimosa	0–1	Adrar Souss
  Wydad Serghini	2–0	US Sidi Mimoun Kasbat Mzar
  JS Kasbah Tadla	1–2	KAC Marrakech
- Sahara
  Team 1	Score	Team 2
  Nojom Awsred	2–1	Club Sadaka Tantan
  AS Mouloudia Tarfaya	3–1	Club Mouloudia Dakhla

=== Fourth round ===
The fourth round will played on 9–10 and 21 March 2024, the clubs who participed in this stage are the qualified teams from the previous round plus the sixteen club of 2022–23 Botola 2.

- North
  Team 1	Score	Team 2
  TAS de Casablanca	0–0 (2–4 p)	Kénitra AC
  US Sidi Kacem	0–0 (4–5 p)	Racing Casablanca
  Qods Taza	2–0	Wydad Sportive de Sefrou
  Widad Témara	2–0	Fath Riadi de Nador
  Wydad de Fès	1–0	Ittihad Khemisset
  Fath Casablanca	2–0	Chabab Atlas Khénifra
  Stade Marocain	2–0	CS Ajax Tanger
  US Musulmane d'Oujda	2–1	AS Sale
- South
  Team 1	Score	Team 2
  US Amal Tiznit	2–0	AS Mouloudia Tarfaya
  Ittihad Riadi Fkih Ben Salah	3–2	Raja Beni Mellal
  Association Al Mansoria	0–3	Renaissance Zemamra
  JS Massira	0–2	Adrar Souss
  KAC Marrakech	1–1 (5–3 p)	Ittifaq Marrakech
  Chabab Ben Guerir	3–2	Wydad Serghini
  Youssoufia Berrechid	2–0	Nojom Awsred
  Olympique Dcheira	2–0	RC Oued Zem

== Final phase ==
=== Qualified teams ===
The following teams competed in the 2022–23 Moroccan Throne Cup.

16 teams of 2022-23 Botola

- AS FAR
- Chabab Mohammédia
- Difaâ El Jadidi
- FUS Rabat
- Hassania Agadir
- IR Tanger
- JS Soualem
- Maghreb de Fès
- Moghreb Tetouan
- Mouloudia Oujda
- OC Khouribga
- Olympic Safi
- Raja Casablanca
- RSB Berkane
- Union de Touarga
- Wydad Casablanca

9 teams of 2022-23 Botola 2

- US Musulmane d'Oujda
- Widad Témara
- Racing Casablanca
- Stade Marocain
- Wydad de Fès
- Chabab Ben Guerir
- Olympique Dcheira
- Renaissance Zemamra
- Youssoufia Berrechid

3 teams of 2022–23 Division National

- KAC Marrakech
- Kénitra AC
- US Amal Tiznit

3 teams of 2022–23 Amateur Division I

- Adrar Souss (South group)
- Fath Casablanca (North Group)
- Qods Taza (North Group)

1 team of 2022–23 Amateur Division II

- Ittihad Riadi Fkih Ben Salah (South group)

=== Road To Final ===
Draw of the 2022–23 Moroccan Throne Cup final phase

Round of 32
KAC Marrakech	1
Hassani Agadir	2
USM d'Oujda (a.e.t.)	3
FUS Rabat	1
Chabab Mohammédia	4
Youssoufia Berrechid	1
Raja Casablanca	2
Olympic Safi	0
OC Khouribga	2
Difaâ El Jadidi	1
Qods Taza	0
Union de Touarga	2
Mouloudia Oujda	1 (5)
Kénitra AC	1 (4)
Widad Témara	0
Racing Casablanca	1
Stade Marocain	0
Moghreb Tetouan	4
Wydad Casablanca	0
JS Soualem	1
Fath Casablanca	2
Wydad de Fès	0
Maghreb de Fès	2 (3)
IR Tanger	2 (0)
US Amal Tiznit	1
Adrar Souss	0
Olympique Dcheira	3
Ittihad Riadi Fkih Ben Salah	1
RS Berkane	2 (7)
AS FAR	2 (8)
Renaissance Zemamra	1
Chabab Ben Guerir	0

Round of 16
Hassania Agadir	2
US Musulmane d'Oujda	0
Chabab Mohammédia	0
Raja Casablanca	1
OC Khouribga	2 (5)
Union de Touarga	2 (3)
Mouloudia Oujda	2 (4)
Racing Casablanca	2 (1)
Moghreb Tetouan (a.e.t.)	2
JS Soualem	1
Fath Casablanca	0
Maghreb de Fès	1
US Amal Tiznit	0
Olympique Dcheira	3
AS FAR	2
Renaissance Zemamra	1

Quarter-finals
Hassania Agadir	2
Raja Casablanca	4
OC Khouribga	0
Mouloudia Oujda	1
Moghreb Tetouan	2
Maghreb de Fès (a.e.t.)	4
Olympique Dcheira	1
AS FAR	2

Semi-finals
Raja Casablanca (a.e.t.)	4
Mouloudia Oujda	3
Maghreb de Fès	0
AS FAR	2

Final
Raja Casablanca	2
AS FAR	1

=== Round of 32 ===
The Round of 32 (1/16) matches were played between 23 March and 2 May 2024. the clubs who participed in this stage are the qualified teams from the previous round plus the sixteen club of 2022–23 Botola.

- North
  Team 1	Score	Team 2
  US Musulmane d'Oujda	3–1 (a.e.t.)	FUS Rabat
  MAS Fez	2–2 (3–0 p)	IR Tanger
  MC Oujda	1–1 (5–4 p)	Kénitra AC
  Widad Témara	0–1	Racing Casablanca
  Qods Taza	0–2	Union de Touarga
  Stade Marocain	0–4	Moghreb Tétouan
  Fath Casablanca	2–0	Wydad de Fès
  RS Berkane	2–2 (7–8 p)	AS FAR
- South

Team 1	Score	Team 2
Wydad AC	0–1	JS Soualem
KAC Marrakech	1–2	Hassania Agadir
OC Khouribga	2–1	Difaâ El Jadidi
Raja CA	2–0	OC Safi
SCC Mohammédia	4–1	Youssoufia Berrechid
Renaissance Zemamra	1–0	Chabab Ben Guerir
Olympique Dcheira	3–1	Ittihad Riadi Fkih Ben Salah
US Amal Tiznit	1–0	Adrar Souss

=== Round of 16 ===
A total of eight games were played on 3, 4, 5, 7 and 8 May 2024.

Team 1	Score	Team 2
OC Khouribga	2–2 (5–3 p)	Union de Touarga
Hassania Agadir	2–0	US Musulmane d'Oujda
MC Oujda	2–2 (4–1 p)	Racing Casablanca
AS FAR	2–1	Renaissance Zemamra
Fath Casablanca	0–1	MAS Fez
US Amal Tiznit	0–3	Olympique Dcheira
Moghreb Tétouan	2–1 (a.e.t.)	JS Soualem
SCC Mohammédia	0–1	Raja CA

=== Quarter-finals ===
The quarter-final matches were played on 11, 12 and 15 May 2024.

Team 1	Score	Team 2
Moghreb Tétouan	2–4 (a.e.t.)	MAS Fez
Hassania Agadir	2–4	Raja CA
OC Khouribga	0–1	MC Oujda
Olympique Dcheira	1–2	AS FAR

=== Semi-finals ===
The semi-final matches were played on 23 and 25 June 2024.

Team 1	Score	Team 2
Raja CA	4–3 (a.e.t.)	MC Oujda
MAS Fez	0–2	AS FAR

=== Final ===
1 July 2024
17:00 UTC+1

Raja CA	2–1	AS FAR
Bouzok 4'; Boulacsoute 78'	Report	Zouhzouh 28'

Adrar Stadium, Agadir
Attendance: 45,480
Referee: Redouane Jiyed
