= 2013 Moroccan Throne Cup =

2013 Moroccan football tournament

Tournament details
- Country: Morocco
- Dates: 2013

Final positions
- Champions: Difaâ Hassani El Jadidi
- Runner-up: Raja CA

The 2013 Moroccan Throne Cup was the 57th edition of the Moroccan Throne Cup.

The defending champions were Raja CA.

The winner of the competition would qualify for the preliminary round of the CAF Confederation Cup.

== Fifth round ==
The fifth round was held on 9 June 2013.

Team 1	Score	Team 2
RCA Zemamra	1-1 (4-5 p)	USM Aït Melloul
Ittihad Riadhi de Tanger	2-1	US Sidi Kacem
Ittihad Khemisset	3-1	USM d'Oujda
Club Sportif de Kasr lakbir	1-0	MC Oujda
Chabab Mohammédia	0-3	Youssoufia Berrechid
JS Massira	1-3	TAS de Casablanca
Chez Ali Club de Marrakech	3-0	Wydad Serghini
Club Chabab de Houara	2-1	Chabab Kasba Tadla
Racing de Casablanca	3-0	Olympique Dcheira
Renaissance Sportive de Settat	3-1	Jaouhara Goulmim
Chabab Atlas Khénifra	3-0	Rachad Bernoussi
AS Salé	0-0 (2-4 p)	UTS Union Touarga Sport Rabat
Fath de Nador	2-2 (4-3 p)	ARBS Rajaa Benssouda
USM Mohammédia	1-2	Club Sportif Wifaq de Bouznika
ARS	1-4	US Témara
Kawkab Marrakech	5-0	CUSL

== Bracket ==
Round of 32
USM Aït Melloul	0
Difaâ Hassani El Jadidi	2
KAC Kénitra	1 (3)
Club Sportif de Kasr lakbir	1 (3)
Renaissance Sportive de Settat	0
Raja CA	2
Racing de Casablanca	0
Olympic Club de Safi	1
Fath de Nador	0
FAR de Rabat	3
Chabab Rif Hoceima	1
Moghreb Tétouan	2
Ittihad Khemisset	0
Wydad de Fes	2
CODM de Meknes	0
Renaissance sportive de Berkane	1
Club Chabab de Houara	0
Hassania d'Agadir	1
Chabab Atlas Khénifra	1
Maghreb de Fes	0
Youssoufia Berrechid	2
Club Sportif Wifaq de Bouznika	3
FUS Rabat	1 (4)
Union de Touarga Rabat	1 (2)
Raja de Beni Mellal	0 (5)
Kawkab Marrakech	0 (3)
US Témara	0 (3)
Ittihad Riadhi de Tanger	0 (2)
Chez Ali Club de Marrakech	0
Olympique de Khouribga	1
Wydad AC	2
TAS de Casablanca	0

Round of 16
Difaâ Hassani El Jadidi	2
FAR de Rabat	1
US Témara	3
Hassania d'Agadir	1
Olympic Club de Safi	2
Club Sportif Wifaq de Bouznika	1
Club Sportif de Kasr lakbir	1
Raja de Beni Mellal	2
Renaissance sportive de Berkane	0
Wydad de Fes	2
Chabab Atlas Khénifra	0
Wydad AC	1
Olympique de Khouribga	0 (2)
Moghreb Tétouan	0 (4)
FUS Rabat	0
Raja CA	2

Quarter-finals
Raja de Beni Mellal	1
Wydad de Fes	0
Olympic Club de Safi	1
Moghreb Tétouan	0
Raja CA	4
US Témara	1
Wydad AC	1 (5)
Difaâ Hassani El Jadidi	1 (6)

Semi-finals
Raja CA	1
Olympic Club de Safi	0
Raja de Beni Mellal	2 (3)
Difaâ Hassani El Jadidi	2 (4)

Final
Difaâ Hassani El Jadidi	0 (5)
Raja CA	0 (4)

== Final phases ==
=== Last 32 ===
Round of 32 matches were held on 5, 6, 7 and 8 September 2013.

Team 1	Score	Team 2
USM Aït Melloul	0-2	Difaâ Hassani El Jadidi
KAC Kénitra	1–1 (3-4 p)	Club Sportif de Kasr lakbir
Renaissance Sportive de Settat	0-2	Raja CA
Racing de Casablanca	0-1	Olympic Club de Safi
Fath de Nador	0-3	FAR de Rabat
Chabab Rif Hoceima	1-2	Moghreb Tétouan
Ittihad Khemisset	0-2	Wydad de Fes
CODM de Meknes	0-1	Renaissance sportive de Berkane
Club Chabab de Houara	0-1	Hassania d'Agadir
Chabab Atlas Khénifra	1-0	Maghreb de Fes
Youssoufia Berrechid	2-3	Club Sportif Wifaq de Bouznika
FUS Rabat	1-1 (4-2 p)	Union de Touarga Rabat
Raja de Beni Mellal	0-0 (5-3 p)	Kawkab Marrakech
US Témara	0-1 (2-3 p)	Ittihad Riadhi de Tanger
Chez Ali Club de Marrakech	0-1	Olympique de Khouribga
Wydad AC	2-0	TAS de Casablanca

=== Last 16 ===
Last 16 matches were held on 15, 16 and 25 September 2013.

Team 1	Score	Team 2
Difaâ Hassani El Jadidi	2-1	FAR de Rabat
US Témara	3-1	Hassania d'Agadir
Olympic Club de Safi	2-1	Club Sportif Wifaq de Bouznika
Club Sportif de Kasr lakbir	1-2	Raja de Beni Mellal
Renaissance sportive de Berkane	0-2	Wydad de Fes
Chabab Atlas Khénifra	0-1	Wydad AC
Olympique de Khouribga	0-0 (2-4 p)	Moghreb Tétouan
FUS Rabat	0-2	Raja CA

=== Quarter-finals ===
The quarter-finals were played on 12, 13 and 14 October 2013.

Team 1	Score	Team 2
Raja de Beni Mellal	1-0	Wydad de Fes
Olympic Club de Safi	1-0	Moghreb Tétouan
Raja CA	4-1	US Témara
Wydad AC	1-1 (5-6 p)	Difaâ Hassani El Jadidi

=== Semi-finals ===
The matches were played at the Fez Stadium on 22 October 2013.

Team 1	Score	Team 2
Raja CA	1-0	Olympic Club de Safi
Raja de Beni Mellal	2-2 (3-4 p)	Difaâ Hassani El Jadidi

=== Final ===
The match was played on 18 November 2013 at the Prince Moulay Abdellah Stadium.

18 November 2013
16:30 GMT

Difaâ Hassani El Jadidi	2-1	Raja CA
	Report
Penalties
	5-4

Prince Moulay Abdellah Stadium, Rabat

== See also ==
- 2013–14 Botola
