= 2019–20 Moroccan Throne Cup =

Coupe du Trône
Tournament details
- Country: Morocco
- Teams: 48 (from the fourth round onwards)

Final positions
- Champions: AS FAR (12th title)
- Runners-up: Moghreb Tétouan

Tournament statistics
- Matches played: 47
- Goals scored: 115 (2.45 per match)
- Top goal scorer(s): Alaeddine Ajaraie (MAS), Ayoub El Kaabi (WAC) (4 goals) (final phase only)
- All statistics correct as of 14 May 2022.

The 2019–20 Moroccan Throne Cup was the 64th staging of the Moroccan Throne Cup, the main knockout football tournament in Morocco. The final was played at the Adrar stadium in Agadir, on 14 May 2022. AS FAR became the champions by beating Moghreb Tétouan with 3–0 in the final.

== Preliminary round ==
=== Fourth round ===
Draw of the 2019–20 Moroccan Throne Cup final phase

The fourth round was played on 15–17 December 2020.

- North group

| Team 1 | Score | Team 2 |
|---|---|---|
| Fath Nador | 0–1 | Union de Touarga |
| DH Khénifra | 1–0 | AS Mansouria |
| Atlas Khénifra | 1–0 | US Taounat |
| Union Sidi Kacem | 1–0 | Stade Marocain |
| IZ Khemisset | 3–1 | Wafaa Fez |
| AS Salé | 1–0 | CR Al Hoceima |
| WA Fès | 2–1 | Kénitra AC |
| COD Meknès | 0–3 | Maghreb Fez |

- South group

| Team 1 | Score | Team 2 |
|---|---|---|
| Ittifaq Marrakech | 2–1 | Najah Souss Agadir |
| Kawkab Marrakech | 0–0 (3–2 p) | Olympique Marrakech |
| OC Youssoufia | 1–1 (5–4 p) | Racing Casablanca |
| Wydad Serghini d'El Kalaâ | 1–1 (3–2 p) | Widad Témara |
| Mouloudia Dakhla | 1–0 | JS Soualem |
| SCC Mohammédia | 4–0 | Olympic Dcheira |
| Rachad Bernoussi | 1–0 | Nojom Awsred |
| CJ Ben Guerir | 1–1 (4–1 p) | Tihad Casablanca ^{TH} |

== Final phase ==
=== Qualified teams ===
The following teams competed in the 2019–20 Moroccan Throne Cup.

16 teams of 2019–20 Botola

- AS FAR
- Difaâ El Jadidi
- FUS Rabat
- Hassania Agadir
- IR Tanger
- Moghreb Tétouan
- Mouloudia Oujda
- Nahdat Zemamra
- Olympic Safi
- Olympique Khouribga
- Raja Beni Mellal
- Raja Casablanca
- Rapide Oued Zem
- RSB Berkane
- Wydad Casablanca
- Youssoufia Berrechid

9 teams of 2019–20 Botola 2

- Chabab Mohammédia
- Maghreb de Fès
- Wydad de Fès
- Chabab Atlas Khénifra
- Ittihad Khemisset
- Kawkab Marrakech
- AS Salé
- Club Jeunesse Ben Guerir
- Union Sidi Kacem

5 teams of 2019–20 Division Nationale

- Union de Touarga
- Wydad Serghini
- Olympique Youssoufia
- Club Rachad Bernoussi
- Mouloudia Dakhla

2 teams of 2019–20 Championnat du Maroc Amateurs II

- Difâa Hamrya Khénifra (Northeast group)
- Ittifaq Marrakech (South group)

=== Bracket ===
Draw of the 2019–20 Moroccan Throne Cup final phase

Round of 32
Olympic Safi | 0
Rapide Oued Zem | 1
Olympique Khouribga | 0
Wydad Casablanca | 1
Chabab Mohammédia | 1
Rachad Bernoussi | 0
Difaâ El Jadidi | 2
Ittifaq Marrakech | 1
AS Salé | 1
Chabab Atlas Khénifra | 3
Moghreb Tétouan | 0 (5)
Fath Rabat | 0 (3)
Nahdat Berkane | 2
Youssoufia Berrechid | 0
Difâa Hamrya Khénifra | 0
Maghreb Fes | 2
Wydad Serghini | 1
Olympique Youssoufia | 0
Raja Beni Mellal | 2
Nahdat Zemamra | 0
Kawkab Marrakech | 3
Mouloudia Dakhla | 1
Hassania Agadir | 2
Chabab Ben Guerir | 1
IR Tanger | 3
Mouloudia Oujda | 0
AS FAR | 1 (3)
Ittihad Touarga | 1 (1)
Raja Casablanca (a.e.t.) | 2
Wydad Fes | 1
Union Sidi Kacem | 1 (8)
Ittihad Khemisset | 1 (7)

Round of 16
Rapide Oued Zem | 1
Wydad Casablanca | 4
Chabab Mohammédia | 3 (5)
Difaâ El Jadidi | 3 (3)
Chabab Atlas Khénifra | 1
Moghreb Tétouan | 3
Nahdat Berkane | 4 (3)
Maghreb Fes | 4 (4)
Wydad Serghini | 1 (5)
Raja Beni Mellal | 1 (6)
Kawkab Marrakech | 1 (2)
Hassania Agadir | 1 (4)
IR Tanger | 1 (1)
AS FAR | 1 (3)
Raja Casablanca | 2
Union Sidi Kacem | 0

Quarter-finals
Wydad Casablanca | 4
Chabab Mohammédia | 0
Moghreb Tétouan | 0 (7)
Maghreb Fes | 0 (6)
Raja Beni Mellal | 2
Hassania Agadir | 0
AS FAR | 1 (5)
Raja Casablanca | 1 (3)

Semi-finals
Wydad Casablanca | 2 (3)
Moghreb Tétouan | 2 (5)
Raja Beni Mellal | 0
AS FAR | 1

Final
Moghreb Tétouan | 0
AS FAR | 3

=== Round of 32 ===
The Round of 32 matches were played on 29–30 December 2020 and 1–3 January 2021.

| Team 1 | Score | Team 2 |
|---|---|---|
| RS Berkane | 2–0 | Youssoufia Berrechid |
| AS Salé | 1–3 | Chabab Atlas Khénifra |
| Difâa Hamrya Khénifra | 0–2 | Maghreb de Fès |
| Moghreb Tétouan | 0–0 (5–3 p) | FUS Rabat |
| IR Tanger | 3–0 | Mouloudia Oujda |
| Raja Casablanca | 2–1 (a.e.t.) | Wydad de Fès |
| AS FAR | 1–1 (3–1 p) | Union de Touarga |
| Union Sidi Kacem | 1–1 (8–7 p) | Ittihad Khemisset |
| Chabab Mohammédia | 1–0 | Club Rachad Bernoussi |
| Olympic Safi | 0–1 | Rapide Oued Zem |
| Difaâ El Jadidi | 2–1 | Ittifaq Marrakech |
| Olympique Khouribga | 0–1 | Wydad Casablanca |
| Wydad Serghini | 1–0 | Olympique Youssoufia |
| Kawkab Marrakech | 3–1 | Mouloudia Dakhla |
| Raja Beni Mellal | 2–0 | Nahdat Zemamra |
| Hassania Agadir | 2–1 | Club Jeunesse Ben Guerir |

=== Round of 16 ===
The Round of 16 matches were played on 2–4 March and 20 April 2021.

| Team 1 | Score | Team 2 |
|---|---|---|
| RS Berkane | 4–4 (3–4 p) | Maghreb de Fès |
| Chabab Atlas Khénifra | 1–3 | Moghreb Tétouan |
| IR Tanger | 1-1 (1–3 p) | AS FAR |
| Raja Casablanca | 2–0 | Union Sidi Kacem |
| Chabab Mohammédia | 3–3 (5–3 p) | Difaâ El Jadidi |
| Rapide Oued Zem | 1–4 | Wydad Casablanca |
| Wydad Serghini | 1–1 (5–6 p) | Raja Beni Mellal |
| Kawkab Marrakech | 1–1 (2–4 p) | Hassania Agadir |

=== Quarter-finals ===
The Quarter-finals matches were played on 4–6 May 2021.

| Team 1 | Score | Team 2 |
|---|---|---|
| Moghreb Tétouan | 0–0 (7–6 p) | Maghreb de Fès |
| AS FAR | 1–1 (5–3 p) | Raja Casablanca |
| Wydad Casablanca | 4–0 | Chabab Mohammédia |
| Raja Beni Mellal | 2–0 | Hassania Agadir |

=== Semi-finals ===
The Semi-finals matches were played 1 August 2021.

| Team 1 | Score | Team 2 |
|---|---|---|
| Wydad Casablanca | 2–2 (3–5 p) | Moghreb Tétouan |
| Raja Beni Mellal | 0–1 | AS FAR |

=== Final ===
14 May 2022
16:00 UTC+1

| Moghreb Tétouan | 0–3 | AS FAR |
|---|---|---|
| | Report | Diney 55'; Adam Ennafati 65'; Abdelillah Amimi 90' |

Stade Adrar, Agadir
Referee: Bouchra Karboubi
