= 2019 Moroccan Throne Cup =

Coupe du Trône
Tournament details
- Country: Morocco

Final positions
- Champions: TAS de Casablanca (1st title)
- Runners-up: Hassania Agadir

The 2019 Moroccan Throne Cup was the 63rd staging of the Moroccan Throne Cup, the main knockout football tournament in Morocco. TAS de Casablanca became the champions by beating Hassania Agadir with 2–1 in the final. For the first time in the history of the tournament, VAR was used (only from the semi-finals onwards).

== Fourth round ==
The fourth round was played on 4 May 2019.

Team 1	Score	Team 2
COD Meknès	4–5	AS Salé
KAC Kénitra	1–2	Ittihad Khemisset
Union de Touarga	2–0	MAS Fez
Olympique Dcheira	5–0	Raja Agadir
Raja Beni Mellal	2–1	Ittifaq Marrakech
Wydad de Fès	2–0	Chabab Mrirt
Racing de Casablanca	2–1	Club Rachad Bernoussi
Stade Marocain	1–1 (3–4 p)	US Musulmane d'Oujda
Union Sidi Kacem	0–3	SCC Mohammédia
TAS de Casablanca	2–0	JS Massira
Chabab Atlas Khénifra	2–1	Wydad Témara
Club Salmi	1–1 (3–0 p)	Olympique Phosboucraa
JS de Kasbah Tadla	2–1	Olympique Youssoufia
Chabab Ben Guerir	1–1 (5–6 p)	Nasma Sportif Settat
Nahdat Zemamra	6–0	Mouloudia Dakhla
Wafa Sportif Driouch	0–1	Fath Wislan

== Final phase ==
=== Qualified teams ===
16 teams of 2018–19 Botola

- AS FAR
- Chabab Rif Hoceima
- Difaâ El Jadidi
- FUS Rabat
- Hassania Agadir
- IR Tanger
- Kawkab Marrakech
- Moghreb Tétouan
- Mouloudia Oujda
- Olympic Safi
- Olympique Khouribga
- Raja Casablanca
- Rapide Oued Zem
- RSB Berkane
- Wydad Casablanca
- Youssoufia Berrechid

10 teams of 2018–19 Botola 2

- AS Salé
- Chabab Atlas Khénifra
- Jeunesse Sportive Soualem
- Ittihad Khemisset
- JS de Kasbah Tadla
- Olympique Dcheira
- Racing de Casablanca
- Raja Beni Mellal
- Nahdat Zemamra
- Wydad de Fès

4 teams of 2018–19 Division Nationale

- Fath Ouislane
- SCC Mohammédia
- TAS de Casablanca
- US Musulmane d'Oujda

2 teams of 2018–19 Championnat du Maroc Amateurs I

- Nasma Sportif Settat
- Union de Touarga

=== Bracket ===
Draw of the 2018–19 Moroccan Throne Cup final phase

Round of 32
Wydad Casablanca	1
AS FAR	3
Olympic Safi	0
Difaâ El Jadidi	1
Chabab Atlas Khénifra	2 (5)
RSB Berkane	2 (4)
Raja Casablanca	2
Nahdat Zemamra	3
TAS de Casablanca	3
Kawkab Marrakech	1
Olympique Dcheira	1 (4)
Olympique Khouribga	1 (3)
Union de Touarga	3
Wydad de Fès	2
US Musulmane d'Oujda	2 (1)
Ittihad Khemisset	2 (3)
Chabab Rif Hoceima	1
IR Tanger	3
FUS Rabat	1
Mouloudia Oujda	0
Hassania Agadir	1
Youssoufia Berrechid	0
AS Salé	2
Fath Ouislane	0
Moghreb Tétouan	1
SCC Mohammédia	0
Racing de Casablanca	2
Raja Beni Mellal	1
Rapide Oued Zem	3
JS de Kasbah Tadla	0
Nasma Sportif Settat	1 (3)
Club Salmi	1 (4)

Round of 16
AS FAR	0
Difaâ El Jadidi	1
Chabab Atlas Khénifra	2
Nahdat Zemamra	1
TAS de Casablanca	2
Olympique Dcheira	1
Union de Touarga	0
Ittihad Khemisset	1
IR Tanger (a.e.t.)	1
FUS Rabat	0
Hassania Agadir	1
AS Salé	0
Moghreb Tétouan	1 (4)
Racing de Casablanca	1 (3)
Rapide Oued Zem	2
Club Salmi	0

Quarter-finals
Difaâ El Jadidi	3
Chabab Atlas Khénifra	0
TAS de Casablanca	4
Ittihad Khemisset	2
IR Tanger	0
Hassania Agadir (a.e.t.)	1
Moghreb Tétouan	4
Rapide Oued Zem	1

Semi-finals
Difaâ El Jadidi	0
TAS de Casablanca (a.e.t.)	1
Hassania Agadir	3
Moghreb Tétouan	0

Final
TAS de Casablanca	2
Hassania Agadir	1

==== Round of 32 ====
The Round of 32 matches were played on 30 and 31 August 2019, 1 and 24 September 2019.

Team 1	Score	Team 2
Chabab Atlas Khénifra	(5–4 p) 2–2	RSB Berkane
US Musulmane d'Oujda	2–2 (1–3 p)	Ittihad Khemisset
Wydad Casablanca	1–3	AS FAR
FUS Rabat	1–0	Mouloudia Oujda
AS Salé	2–0	Fath Ouislane
Moghreb Tétouan	1–0	SCC Mohammédia
Union de Touarga	3–2	Wydad de Fès
Chabab Rif Hoceima	1–3	IR Tanger
Olympic Safi	0–1	Difaâ El Jadidi
Nasma Sportif Settat	1–1 (3–4 p)	Club Salmi
Raja Casablanca	2–3	Nahdat Zemamra
TAS de Casablanca	3–1	Kawkab Marrakech
Rapide Oued Zem	3–0	JS de Kasbah Tadla
Racing de Casablanca	2–1	Raja Beni Mellal
Hassania Agadir	1–0	Youssoufia Berrechid
Olympique Dcheira	(4–3 p) 1–1	Olympique Khouribga

==== Round of 16 ====
The Round of 16 matches were played on 25, 27 September and 2 October 2019.

Team 1	Score	Team 2
AS FAR	0–1	Difaâ El Jadidi
IR Tanger	(a.e.t.) 1–0	FUS Rabat
TAS de Casablanca	2–1	Olympique Dcheira
Moghreb Tétouan	(4–3 p) 1–1	Racing de Casablanca
Rapide Oued Zem	2–0	Club Salmi
Union de Touarga	0–1	Ittihad Khemisset
Hassania Agadir	1–0	AS Salé
Chabab Atlas Khénifra	2–1	Nahdat Zemamra

==== Quarter-finals ====
The quarter-finals were played on 22, 23 and 24 October 2019.

Team 1	Score	Team 2
Difaâ El Jadidi	3–0	Chabab Atlas Khénifra
TAS de Casablanca	4–2	Ittihad Khemisset
IR Tanger	0–1 (a.e.t.)	Hassania Agadir
Moghreb Tétouan	4–1	Rapide Oued Zem

==== Semi-finals ====
The semi-finals were played on 9 and 10 November 2019.

Team 1	Score	Team 2
Difaâ El Jadidi	0–1 (a.e.t.)	TAS de Casablanca
Hassania Agadir	3–0	Moghreb Tétouan

9 November 2019
15:00 UTC+1

Difaâ El Jadidi	0–1 (a.e.t.)	TAS de Casablanca
	Report	Asha 120+8' (pen.)

Ibn Batouta Stadium, Tanger
Referee: Samir Guezzaz

10 November 2019
15:00 UTC+1

Hassania Agadir	3–0	Moghreb Tétouan
Bouftini 11' (pen.), 90+3' (pen.); Seyam 42'	Report

Marrakesh Stadium, Marrakesh
Referee: Abdelaziz Lamsallek

==== Final ====
18 November 2019
15:00 UTC+1

TAS de Casablanca	2–1	Hassania Agadir
Oussama Lamlioui 17', 75' (pen.)		Malick Cisse 14'

Honneur Stadium, Oujda
Referee: Adil Zourak
