= 2021–22 Botola 2 =

Moroccan football league championship

Botola 2
- Season: 2021–22
- Promoted: Moghreb Tétouan; Union de Touarga
- Relegated: TAS de Casablanca; Kawkab Marrakech
- Matches: 240
- Goals: 501 (2.09 per match)
- Biggest home win: Renaissance Zemamra 4-0 JS Massira (23 October 2021)
- Biggest away win: Kawkab Marrakech 0-3 Chabab Ben Guerir (4 December 2021)
- Highest scoring: Renaissance Zemamra 4-3 Racing Casablanca (19 February 2022); Stade Marocain 4-3 Renaissance Zemamra (17 April 2022)
- Longest winning run: 6 matches AS Sale; Moghreb Tétouan
- Longest unbeaten run: 19 matches Moghreb Tétouan
- Longest winless run: 20 matches Kawkab Marrakech
- Longest losing run: 6 matches Raja Beni Mellal
- All statistics correct as of 29 May 2022.

The 2021–22 Botola 2, also known as Botola Pro 2 Inwi for sponsorship reasons, is the 60th season of Botola 2, the second division of the Moroccan football league. The season began on 4 December 2020 and is scheduled to end by the summer of 2021.

== Teams ==
Locations of the 2021–22 Botola 2 teams
Sahara
Locations of the 2021–22 Botola 2 teams

Team name	Acronym	Location	Stadium	Capacity
AS Salé	ASS	Salé	Stade Boubker Ammar	10,000
Chabab Atlas Khénifra	CAK	Khenifra	Stade Municipal de Khenifra	10,000
Chabab Ben Guerir	CJBG	Ben Guerir	Stade Municipal de Ben Guerir	3,000
Ittihad Khemisset	IZK	Khemisset	Stade du 18 novembre	10,000
JS Massira	JSM	Laayoune	Stade Moulay Rachid	5,000
Kawkab Marrakech	KACM	Marrakesh	Marrakesh Stadium	45,240
Moghreb Tétouan	MAT	Tétouan	Saniat Rmel	15,000
Olympique Dcheira	OD	Dcheira	Stade Ahmed Fana	5,000
Racing de Casablanca	RAC	Casablanca	Stade Père-Jégo	10,000
Raja Beni Mellal	RBM	Beni Mellal	Stade d'honneur de Beni Mellal	12,000
Nahdat Zemamra	RCAZ	Zemamra	Stade Ahmed Choukri	2,500
Stade Marocain	SM	Rabat	Stade Ahmed-Chhoude	5,000
Tihad Casablanca	TAS	Casablanca	Stade Larbi Zaouli	30,000
US Musulmane d'Oujda	USMO	Oujda	Stade municipal d'Oujda	10,000
Union de Touarga	UST	Rabat	Stade Belvédère	15,000
Wydad de Fès	WAF	Fez	Stade Hassan-II	10,000

	Regions of Morocco	Number of teams	Teams
1	Rabat-Salé-Kénitra	4	AS Salé, IZ Khemisset, S Marocain and US Touarga
2	Casablanca-Settat	3	Racing AC, RCA Zemamra and Tihad AS
3	Béni Mellal-Khénifra	2	CA Khénifra and R Beni Mellal
3	Marrakesh-Safi	2	CG Ben Guerir and KAC Marrakech
5	Fès-Meknès	1	WA Fès
5	Laâyoune-Sakia El Hamra	1	JS Massira
5	Oriental	1	USM Oujda
5	Souss-Massa	1	O Dcheira
5	Tanger-Tetouan-Al Hoceima	1	MA Tétouan

== League table ==
Pos	Team	Pld	W	D	L	GF	GA	GD	Pts	Qualification or relegation
1	Moghreb Tétouan (Q)	30	20	6	4	47	19	+28	66	Promoted for Botola
2	Union de Touarga (Q)	30	15	10	5	40	31	+9	55	Promoted for Botola
3	Olympique Dcheira	30	10	14	6	28	22	+6	44 (Note: Head-to-head: Olympique Dechira : 4 points, Renaissance Zemamra: 1 point.)	
4	Renaissance Zemamra	30	12	8	10	39	32	+7	44	
5	JS Massira	30	11	8	11	25	33	−8	41	
6	AS Sale	30	10	10	10	32	33	−1	40 (Note: Head-to-head: AS Salé : 4 points, Stade Marocain: 1 point.)	
7	Stade Marocain	30	9	13	8	36	34	+2	40	
8	Ittihad Khemisset	30	11	6	13	27	32	−5	39	
9	Chabab Ben Guerir	30	9	10	11	23	24	−1	37 (Note: Head-to-head: Chabab Ben Guerir : 4 points, Raja Beni Mellal: 1 point.)	
10	Raja Beni Mellal	30	8	13	9	24	30	−6	37	
11	Racing Casablanca	30	9	9	12	33	39	−6	36	
12	Wydad de Fès	30	8	11	11	30	33	−3	35	
13	Chabab Atlas Khénifra	30	7	13	10	29	29	0	34 (Note: Head-to-head: Chabab Khenifra : 6 points, US Musulmane d'Oujda: 5 points, Tihad Casablanca: 4 points.)	
14	US Musulmane d'Oujda	30	8	10	12	34	36	−2	34	
15	Tihad Casablanca (R)	30	8	10	12	27	31	−4	34	Relegation to Amateur National
16	Kawkab Marrakech (R)	30	5	9	16	27	43	−16	24	Relegation to Amateur National

Updated to match(es) played on 29 May 2022. Source:
Rules for classification: 1) Points; 2a) Head-to-head goal difference if they are two teams with equal points; 2b) Goal difference if they are more than two teams with equal points; 3) Number of wins; 4) Goals scored; 5) Play-off between involved teams.
(Q) Qualified for the phase indicated; (R) Relegated

== Results ==
Home \ Away	ASS	CAK	CJBG	KACM	IZK	JSM	MAT	OD	RAC	RCAZ	RBM	SM	TAS	USMO	UTS	WAF
AS Sale	—	0–1	2–1	1–1	2–1	0–1	0–2	2–2	1–1	1–2	0–1	3–2	2–1	1–1	0–1	1–0
Chabab Atlas Khénifra	0–0	—	1–1	4–1	3–1	1–2	1–2	1–1	1–3	0–0	1–1	1–3	3–0	0–0	1–1	1–0
Chabab Ben Guerir	0–0	0–0	—	0–1	0–1	1–0	0–1	0–2	2–2	1–1	1–0	1–0	0–0	2–2	1–0	0–0
Kawkab Marrakech	0–1	0–1	0–3	—	2–3	0–1	0–1	0–1	4–1	1–3	1–1	2–3	0–0	3–2	1–1	–
Ittihad Khemisset	1–0	1–0	0–1	1–1	—	1–0	0–2	0–0	2–3	1–0	2–0	2–2	1–0	1–0	0–1	1–1
JS Massira	3–2	1–0	1–0	0–2	0–2	—	2–2	1–0	1–0	1–0	1–1	0–1	0–0	1–0	1–1	1–0
Moghreb Tétouan	0–1	1–0	2–1	1–0	3–1	3–0	—	4–1	2–0	2–0	2–1	2–1	0–0	1–0	2–0	2–0
Olympique Dcheira	1–1	1–2	0–0	2–0	1–1	1–0	0–0	—	1–1	1–0	3–1	1–0	0–0	3–1	0–1	3–2
Racing Casablanca	0–0	3–2	1–0	2–1	1–0	1–0	1–2	1–0	—	1–2	0–0	2–0	0–1	0–2	0–2	1–1
Nahdat Zemamra	1–1	1–0	0–1	3–1	1–2	4–0	2–1	0–0	4–3	—	2–2	0–0	1–0	2–2	0–1	2–1
Raja Beni Mellal	1–2	1–0	0–0	0–0	1–0	1–1	2–2	0–0	1–0	0–2	—	0–0	1–0	1–0	3–2	1–2
Stade Marocain	1–1	1–1	1–0	0–0	1–0	2–2	2–1	2–2	1–1	4–3	0–0	—	0–1	2–0	2–3	3–1
Tihad Casablanca	1–2	1–1	4–2	1–0	1–0	1–1	0–0	0–1	2–2	1–2	0–1	3–1	—	0–1	1–3	3–1
US Musulmane d'Oujda	2–3	0–0	2–1	2–2	3–0	2–0	2–1	0–0	1–1	2–1	2–0	0–0	1–2	—	1–2	1–1
Union de Touarga	2–1	2–2	0–2	1–1	2–1	3–2	0–0	0–0	2–1	0–0	3–1	1–1	2–1	2–1	—	1–1
Wydad de Fès	2–1	0–0	0–1	3–1	0–0	1–1	1–3	1–0	1–0	1–0	1–1	0–0	2–2	3–1	3–0	—

Updated to match(es) played on 29 May 2022. Source:
Legend: Blue = home team win; Yellow = draw; Red = away team win.
For upcoming matches, an "a" indicates there is an article about the rivalry between the two participants.

== Positions by round ==
The table lists the positions of teams after each week of matches.

Team ╲ Round	1	2	3	4	5	6	7	8	9	10	11	12	13	14	15	16	17	18	19	20	21	22	23	24	25	26	27	28	29	30
Moghreb Tétouan	10	15	15	13	6	7	5	6	4	3	2	2	2	2	1	1	1	1	1	1	1	1	1	1	1	1	1	1	1	1
Union de Touarga	7	11	9	9	12	5	3	2	2	2	1	1	1	1	2	2	2	2	2	2	2	2	2	2	2	2	2	2	2	2
Raja Beni Mellal	9	5	6	7	9	9	7	8	6	8	6	6	7	8	6	3	4	3	3	3										
Stade Marocain	3	1	3	3	2	2	4	5	5	5	8	4	5	3	3	4	6	6	4	5										
Olympique Dcheira	12	12	14	14	10	4	6	7	9	10	10	10	9	6	5	6	3	5	5	6										
Nahdat Zemamra	2	7	11	11	5	3	2	3	3	4	4	3	6	7	9	7	5	4	6	4										
Ittihad Khemisset	5	9	12	12	15	11	8	4	7	6	9	9	10	9	7	8	10	7	7	7										
JS Massira	6	4	5	6	4	12	9	10	8	7	5	7	4	5	8	9	8	10	8	8										
AS Sale	4	2	1	1	1	1	1	1	1	1	3	5	3	4	4	5	7	8	9	9										
Chabab Ben Guerir	11	8	2	2	3	10	14	13	14	14	11	12	12	12	11	10	9	9	10											
Racing Casablanca	8	3	4	5	8	13	13	9	10	9	7	8	8	10	10	13	11	11	11	12										
Tihad Casablanca	16	14	10	4	7	8	12	14	11	11	12	13	14	11	14	15	14	13	12	11	15									
Chabab Atlas Khénifra	1	6	7	10	13	15	10	11	12	12	13	11	11	13	12	12	12	12	13	10	14									
US Musulmane d'Oujda	13	13	13	15	11	14	15	15	15	15	15	15	15	15	13	11	13	14	14											
Wydad de Fès	14	10	8	8	14	6	11	12	13	13	14	14	13	14	15	14	15	15	15	13										
Kawkab Marrakech	15	16	16	16	16	16	16	16	16	16	16	16	16	16	16	16	16	16	16	16	16	16	16	16	16	16	16	16	16	16

Leader and Promoted for Botola
Promoted for Botola
Relegation to Amateur National Championship

Source: Botola

== See also ==
- 2021–22 Botola
- 2021–22 Moroccan Amateur National Championship
