= 2017 Moroccan Throne Cup =

Coupe du Trône
Tournament details
- Country: Morocco

Final positions
- Champions: Raja Casablanca (8th title)
- Runners-up: Difaâ El Jadidi

The 2017 Moroccan Throne Cup was the 61st staging of the Moroccan Throne Cup. The winners were assured a place for the 2018 CAF Confederation Cup preliminary round.

The 2017 Moroccan Throne Cup Final was played at the Prince Moulay Abdellah Stadium in Rabat, on 18 November 2017. Raja Casablanca won their 8th title.

== Final phase ==
=== Qualified teams ===
The following teams competed in the 2017 Coupe du Trône.

16 teams of 2016–17 Botola

- Chabab Atlas Khénifra
- Chabab Rif Hoceima
- Difaâ El Jadidi
- FAR Rabat
- FUS Rabat
- Hassania Agadir
- IR Tanger
- JS de Kasbah Tadla
- KAC Kénitra
- Kawkab Marrakech
- Moghreb Tétouan
- Olympic Safi
- Olympique Khouribga
- Raja Casablanca
- RSB Berkane
- Wydad Casablanca

8 teams of 2016–17 GNF 2

- AS Salé
- MC Oujda
- Olympique Dcheira
- Rapide Oued Zem
- Union Sidi Kacem
- US Témara
- Wydad de Fès
- Youssoufia Berrechid

7 teams of 2015–16 GNFA 1

- Chabab Houara
- Club Salmi
- Olympique Marrakech
- Olympique Phosboucraa
- Renaissance Ezzmamra
- Stade Marocain
- TAS de Casablanca

1 team of 2015–16 GNFA 2

- Rajaa Sportif d'Arfoud

=== Bracket ===
Round of 32
KAC Kénitra	2	0	2
TAS (a)	1	1	2
OC phosboucraa L	0	0	0
Kasbah Tadla (p)	0	0	0
Kawkab Marrakech	0	0	0
Wydad AC	1	2	3
RSB Berkane	0	4	4
US Témara	0	0	0
Moghreb Tétouan	2	0	2
AS Salé (a)	1	1	2
CR Al-Hoceima	1	2	3
RS Arfoud	0	0	0
CRK Zemamra	2	1	3
Difaâ El Jadidi	3	3	6
IR Tanger	1	1	2
Union Sidi Kacem	1	0	1
Stade Marocain	2	2	4
FAR Rabat	3	2	5
Club Salmi	1	4	5
CAY Berrechid	1	1	2
Rapide Oued Zem	1	1	2
Chabab Houara	0	1	1
OC Khouribga (a)	0	1	1
O Marrakech	0	1	1
Raja Casablanca	0	4	4
Olympique Dcheira	0	1	1
FUS Rabat	2	1	3
MC Oujda	0	1	1
Wydad de Fès	0	0	0
CA Khénifra	0	1	1
Hassania Agadir	3	1	4
Olympic Safi	1	0	1

Round of 16
TAS de Casablanca	2	0	2
JS Kasbah Tadla	4	0	4
Wydad Casablanca	1	1	2
RSB Berkane	1	2	3
AS Salé	0	1	1
CR Al-Hoceima	2	0	2
Difaâ El Jadidi (a)	0	1	1
IR Tanger	0	1	1
FAR Rabat	4	1	5
Club Salmi	0	1	1
Rapide Oued Zem	1	0	1
OC Khouribga	0	2	2
Raja Casablanca	0	2	2
FUS Rabat	0	1	1
CA Khénifra (a)	0	2	2
Hassania Agadir	1	1	2

Quarter-finals
JS Kasbah Tadla	0	0	0
RSB Berkane	1	4	5
CR Hoceima	2	0	2
Difaâ El Jadidi	1	2	3
FAR Rabat	2	3	5
OC Khouribga	0	1	1
Raja Casablanca	5	2	7
CA Khénifra	1	0	1

Semi-finals
RSB Berkane	0	3	3
Difaâ El Jadidi	0	4	4
FAR Rabat	1	0	1
Raja CA (a)	1	0	1

Final
Difaâ El Jadidi	1(1)
Raja Casablanca (p)	1(3)

== Round of 16 ==
- 1/16th finals of the Coupe du Trône First leg: 22–23 August 2017
- 1/16th finals of the Coupe du Trône Second leg: 26–27 August 2017

Draw of the Coupe du Trône 2016 - 2017 season

Team 1	Agg.	Team 2	1st leg	2nd leg
Wydad de Fès	0 - 1	Chabab Atlas Khénifra	0 - 0	0 - 1
FUS Rabat	3 - 1	MC Oujda	2- 0	1 - 1
Moghreb Tétouan	2 - 2 (a)	AS Salé	2 - 1	0 - 1
IR Tanger	2 - 1	Union Sidi Kacem	1 - 1	1 - 0
RSB Berkane	4 - 0	US Témara	0 - 0	4 - 0
Stade Marocain	4 - 5	FAR Rabat	2 - 3	2 - 2
KAC Kénitra	2 - 2 (a)	TAS de Casablanca	2 - 1	0 - 1
Chabab Rif Hoceima	3 - 0	Rajaa Sportif d'Arfoud	1 - 0	2 - 0
Hassania Agadir	4 - 1	Olympic Safi	3 - 1	1 - 0
Renaissance Ezzmamra	3 - 6	Difaâ El Jadidi	2 - 3	1 - 3
Club Salmi	5 - 2	Youssoufia Berrechid	1 - 1	4 - 1
Raja Casablanca	4 - 1	Olympique Dcheira	0 - 0	4 - 1
Olympique Phosboucraa	0 - 0 (3–4 p)	JS de Kasbah Tadla	0 - 0	0 - 0
Olympique Khouribga	(a) 1 - 1	Olympique Marrakech	0 - 0	1 - 1
Kawkab Marrakech	0 - 3	Wydad Casablanca	0 - 1	0 - 2
Rapide Oued Zem	2 - 1	Chabab Houara	1 - 0	1 - 1

== Round of 8 ==
- 1/8th finals of the Coupe du Trône First leg: 12–13 September 2017
- 1/8th finals of the Coupe du Trône Second leg: 19–20 September 2017

Team 1	Agg.	Team 2	1st leg	2nd leg
TAS de Casablanca	2 - 4	JS de Kasbah Tadla	2 - 4	0 - 0
Wydad Casablanca	2 - 3	RSB Berkane	1 - 1	1 - 2
AS Salé	1 - 2	Chabab Rif Hoceima	0 - 2	1 - 0
Difaâ El Jadidi	(a) 1 - 1	IR Tanger	0 - 0	1 - 1
FAR Rabat	5 - 1	Club Salmi	4 - 0	1 - 1
Rapide Oued Zem	1 - 2	OC Khouribga	1 - 0	0 - 2
Raja Casablanca	2-1	FUS Rabat	0 - 0	2 - 1
Chabab Atlas Khénifra	(a) 2 - 2	Hassania Agadir	0 - 1	2 - 1

== Quarter-finals ==
- 1/4th finals of the Coupe du Trône First leg: 11 October 2017
- 1/4th finals of the Coupe du Trône Second leg: 25 October 2017

Team 1	Agg.	Team 2	1st leg	2nd leg
JS de Kasbah Tadla	0 - 5	RSB Berkane	0 - 1	0 - 4
Chabab Rif Hoceima	2 - 3	Difaâ El Jadidi	2 - 1	0 - 2
FAR Rabat	5 - 1	OC Khouribga	2 - 0	3 - 1
Raja Casablanca	7 - 1	Chabab Atlas Khénifra	5 - 1	2 - 0

== Semi-finals ==
- Semi-finals of the Coupe du Trône First leg: 25–26 October 2017
- Semi-finals of the Coupe du Trône Second leg: 1–2 November 2017

Team 1	Agg.	Team 2	1st leg	2nd leg
RS Berkane	3 - 4	Difaâ El Jadidi	0 - 0	3 - 4
FAR Rabat	1 - 1 (a)	Raja Casablanca	1 - 1	0 - 0

== Final ==
18 November 2017
16:00 UTC

DH Jadidi	1–1 (a.e.t.)	Raja CA
Ahaddad 59' (pen.)		H. Iajour 28'
Penalties
Nanah (penalty missed); Ngah (penalty scored); Bamaamar (penalty missed); Hadhoudi (penalty missed)	1–3	(penalty scored) Achchakir; (penalty missed) M. Iajour; (penalty scored) Banoun; (penalty scored) Erraki

Prince Moulay Abdellah Stadium, Rabat
Referee: Hicham Tiazi

== See also ==
- 2016–17 Botola
- 2018 CAF Confederation Cup
