= 2013–14 Botola 2 =

The 2013–14 GNF 2 is the 52nd season of Botola 2 (the 2nd tier football league in Morocco). This season started on 21 September 2013 and ended on 28 May 2014. On 3 May 2014, Ittihad Khemisset secure their promotion after draw 1-1 in their home match while Chabab Atlas Khenifra also secure their promotion for first time after their 1-0 victory against Racing Athletique Casablanca in the same time, left them 7 points away from remain in GNF 2 with only 2 games left. Ittihad Khemisset clinched their first title after defeat 2-0 in their home match in 30th week while in the same time Chabab Atlas Khenifra goalless draw against Ittihad Tanger.

On 18 May 2014, USM Oujda was relegated after draw 1-1 against CODM Meknes in their away match. Rachad Bernoussi also relegated to GNFA 1 (3rd tier) after draw 1-1 against Chabab Houara in their away match on 24 May 2014 while in the same time USM Ait Melloul defeat CA Youssoufia Berrechid in their away match with score 2-0.

== Promotion and relegation ==
Teams promoted from 2012-13 GNFA 1

- Chabab Club Houara
- Chabab Atlas Khenifra

Teams relegated from 2012–13 Botola

- CODM Meknes
- Raja Beni Mellal

== League standings ==
Pos	Team	Pld	W	D	L	GF	GA	GD	Pts	Promotion or relegation
1	Ittihad Khemisset	30	15	12	3	34	13	+21	57	Promotion to 2014–15 Botola
2	Chabab Atlas Khenifra	30	13	14	3	36	13	+23	53	Promotion to 2014–15 Botola
3	Ittihad Tanger	30	12	12	6	33	21	+12	48	
4	CODM Meknes	30	11	13	6	34	31	+3	46	
5	US Temara	30	12	9	9	26	25	+1	44 (Note: Union Sportive Temara were deducted 1 point.)	
6	Raja Beni Mellal	30	9	14	7	38	33	+5	41	
7	Union de Mohammedia	30	10	9	11	23	27	−4	39	
8	JS de Kasbah Tadla	30	6	18	6	31	29	+2	36	
9	Youssoufia Berrechid	30	8	12	10	24	28	−4	36	
10	MC Oujda	30	7	14	9	25	30	−5	35	
11	Chabab Houara	30	9	8	13	30	37	−7	35	
12	JSM Laayoune	30	9	8	13	23	34	−11	35	
13	Racing Casablanca	30	9	7	14	25	28	−3	34	
14	Union Ait Melloul	30	5	15	10	23	33	−10	30	
15	Rachad Bernoussi	30	6	11	13	21	31	−10	29	Relegation to GNFA 1
16	USM Oujda	30	6	10	14	23	36	−13	28	Relegation to GNFA 1

Updated to match(es) played on 28 May 2014. Source:
Rules for classification: 1) points; 2) goal difference; 3) number of goals scored.
