= 2020–21 Botola 2 =

Moroccan football league championship

Botola 2
- Season: 2020–21
- Champions: Olympique Khouribga
- Promoted: Jeunesse Soualem; Olympique Khouribga
- Relegated: Widad Témara; KAC Kénitra
- Matches: 240
- Goals: 532 (2.22 per match)
- Biggest home win: Jeunesse Soualem 5-0 Racing Casablanca (18 June 2021)
- Biggest away win: TAS Casablanca 0-4 Olympique Dcheira (30 January 2021)
- Highest scoring: TAS Casablanca 3-3 Atlas Khénifra (8 December 2020); Raja Beni Mellal 2-4 Stade Marocain (28 January 2021); Olympique Dcheira 4-2 Widad Témara (20 March 2021); Ittihad Khemisset 5-1 Widad Témara (23 May 2021)
- Longest winning run: 6 matches Wydad de Fès
- Longest unbeaten run: 13 matches Olympique Khouribga
- Longest winless run: 13 matches Widad Témara; TAS Casablanca
- Longest losing run: 6 matches Atlas Khénifra
- All statistics correct as of 9 July 2021.

The 2020–21 Botola 2, also known as Botola Pro 2 Inwi for sponsorship reasons, is the 59th season of Botola 2, the second division of the Moroccan football league. The season began on 4 December 2020 and is scheduled to end by the summer of 2021.

Locations of the 2020–21 Botola 2 teams

== Teams ==
Team name	Acronym	Location	Stadium	Capacity
AS Salé	ASS	Salé	Stade Boubker Ammar	10,000
Chabab Atlas Khénifra	CAK	Khenifra	Stade Municipal de Khenifra	5,000
Raja Beni Mellal	RBM	Beni Mellal	Stade Municipal de Beni Mellal	15,000
Chabab Ben Guerir	CJBG	Ben Guerir	Stade Municipal de Ben Guerir	4,000
Ittihad Khemisset	IZK	Khemisset	Stade du 18 novembre	10,000
KAC Kénitra	KAC	Kenitra	Stade Municipal (Kenitra)	15,000
Kawkab Marrakech	KACM	Marrakesh	Marrakesh Stadium	45,240
Olympique Dcheira	OD	Dcheira	Stade Ahmed Fana	1,000
Olympique Club de Khouribga	OCK	Khouribga	Complexe OCP	10,000
Racing de Casablanca	RAC	Casablanca	Stade Père-Jégo	10,000
Jeunesse Soualem	JSS	Soualem	Stade Municipal Had Soualem	
Union de Touarga	UTS	Salé	Stade les Chênes-Sala Al Jadida	
Stade Marocain	SM	Rabat	Stade Ahmed Chouhoud	10,000
Tihad Casablanca	TAS	Casablanca	Stade Larbi Zaouli	30,000
Widad Témara	WST	Temara	Stade Yacoub El Mansour	5,000
Wydad de Fès	WAF	Fez	Fez Stadium	45,000

	Regions of Morocco	Number of teams	Teams
1	Rabat-Salé-Kénitra	6	AS Salé, KAC Kénitra, Ittihad Khemisset, Union de Touarga, Stade Marocain and Widad Témara
2	Casablanca-Settat	3	Racing de Casablanca, Jeunesse Soualem and Tihad Casablanca
2	Béni Mellal-Khénifra	3	Raja Beni Mellal, Chabab Atlas Khénifra and Olympique Club de Khouribga
4	Marrakesh-Safi	2	Chabab Ben Guerir and Kawkab Marrakech
5	Fès-Meknès	1	Wydad de Fès
5	Souss-Massa	1	Olympique Dcheira

== League table ==
Pos	Team	Pld	W	D	L	GF	GA	GD	Pts	Qualification or relegation
1	Olympique Khouribga (P)	30	14	12	4	38	25	+13	54	Promoted for Botola
2	Jeunesse Soualem (P)	30	15	8	7	36	20	+16	53	Promoted for Botola
3	Wydad de Fès	30	14	7	9	40	28	+12	49	
4	Union de Touarga	30	13	9	8	39	34	+5	48 (Note: Union Touarga finished ahead of Olympique Dcheira on head-to-head goal difference: Union Touarga 3–2 Olympique Dcheira, Olympique Dcheira 1–1 Union Touarga.)	
5	Olympique Dcheira	30	13	9	8	40	30	+10	48	
6	Ittihad Khemisset	30	12	5	13	35	33	+2	41	
7	Stade Marocain	30	10	10	10	37	37	0	40	
8	Chabab Ben Guerir	30	10	8	12	34	39	−5	38	
9	Kawkab Marrakech	30	8	13	9	32	26	+6	37 (Note: Kawkab Marrakesh finished ahead of Racing Casablanca on head-to-head goal difference: Kawkab Marrakesh 1–1 Racing Casablanca, Racing Casablanca 0–2 Kawkab Marrakesh.)	
10	Racing Casablanca	30	9	10	11	35	36	−1	37	
11	Raja Beni Mellal	30	10	6	14	21	27	−6	36 (Note: Raja Beni Mellal finished ahead of Atlas Khenifra on number of wins 10 vs 9 after being even head-to-head goal difference: Raja Beni Mellal 1–0 Atlas Khenifra, Atlas Khenifra 1–0 Raja Beni Mellal.)	
12	Chabab Atlas Khénifra	30	9	9	12	35	39	−4	36	
13	Tihad Casablanca	30	7	14	9	35	40	−5	35	
14	AS Sale	30	8	11	11	28	36	−8	35	
15	Kenitra AC (R)	30	8	11	11	27	37	−10	35	Relegation to Amateur National
16	Widad Temara (R)	30	2	14	14	20	45	−25	20	Relegation to Amateur National

Updated to match(es) played on 9 July 2021. Source: frmf.ma
Rules for classification: 1) Points; 2a) Head-to-head goal difference if they are two teams with equal points; 2b) Goal difference if they are more than two teams with equal points; 3) Number of wins; 4) Goals scored; 5) Play-off between involved teams.
(P) Promoted; (R) Relegated

== Results ==
Home \ Away	ASS	CAK	CJBG	KAC	KACM	IZK	JSS	OCK	OD	RAC	RBM	SM	TAS	UTS	WAF	WST
AS Salé	—	1–1	3–1	1–1	1–0	1–2	1–0	2–2	2–2	1–0	1–1	0–0	0–2	1–0	0–3	1–1
Chabab Atlas Khénifra	1–0	—	2–2	1–1	0–0	2–0	2–0	2–2	1–3	1–1	1–0	0–1	1–0	2–0	1–2	2–0
Chabab Ben Guerir	0–1	3–2	—	2–1	2–1	1–2	2–0	2–3	1–0	1–1	1–0	0–1	0–1	1–1	1–1	2–1
Kenitra AC	1–2	2–1	1–0	—	0–0	1–2	1–1	0–2	0–0	1–0	1–1	2–0	0–1	1–2	1–1	1–0
Kawkab Marrakech	1–1	3–0	1–1	4–1	—	2–0	1–2	1–1	1–2	1–1	0–1	2–2	0–0	2–2	2–1	3–1
Ittihad Khemisset	2–1	1–1	1–2	0–1	0–1	—	1–1	1–2	1–2	1–2	1–0	3–0	2–0	0–1	2–1	5–1
Jeunesse Soualem	1–0	1–0	1–2	2–0	1–0	1–0	—	0–1	0–0	5–0	1–0	1–1	2–1	0–0	1–0	2–0
Olympique Club de Khouribga	2–0	2–2	1–0	1–1	2–0	0–0	1–0	—	0–1	0–0	2–1	2–1	2–1	0–0	2–1	1–1
Olympique Dcheira	0–0	1–0	2–3	0–0	1–0	1–0	1–2	1–0	—	0–0	0–0	1–2	3–0	1–1	2–1	4–2
Racing Casablanca	3–1	3–1	2–2	1–2	0–2	3–0	3–2	0–0	2–3	—	1–2	1–0	2–2	0–1	1–0	3–1
Raja Beni Mellal	1–2	1–0	1–0	1–0	1–1	1–0	0–2	1–1	1–0	1–0	—	2–4	1–1	0–1	0–1	2–0
Stade Marocain	1–1	1–2	2–0	1–2	1–0	1–2	0–3	1–1	3–1	1–0	0–1	—	2–2	2–3	2–2	2–0
Tihad Casablanca	3–1	3–3	1–1	2–2	0–0	1–1	0–0	2–1	0–4	1–1	2–0	2–2	—	0–1	3–1	2–2
Union de Touarga	1–0	1–3	3–1	3–0	1–3	2–3	1–3	2–3	3–2	2–2	1–0	0–0	2–0	—	1–2	0–0
Wydad de Fès	2–1	3–0	2–0	4–1	0–0	0–2	1–1	1–0	2–0	1–0	1–0	0–0	2–1	1–2	—	3–1
Widad Temara	1–1	1–0	0–0	1–1	0–0	0–0	0–0	0–1	2–2	0–2	1–0	1–3	1–1	1–1	0–0	—

Updated to match(es) played on 9 July 2021. Source:
Legend: Blue = home team win; Yellow = draw; Red = away team win.
For upcoming matches, an "a" indicates there is an article about the rivalry between the two participants.

== See also ==
- 2020–21 Botola
- 2020-21 Moroccan Amateur National Championship
