= 2018–19 Botola 2 =

Botola 2
- Season: 2018–19
- Promoted: Chabab Mohammédia
- Relegated: Racing de Casablanca

The 2018-2019 Botola 2 is the 57th season of Botola 2, the second division of the Moroccan football league.

== Teams ==
=== Teams relegated from 2017-18 Botola ===
- Chabab Atlas Khénifra
- Racing de Casablanca

=== Teams promoted from 2017-18 Amateur National Championship ===
- Chabab Riadi Salmi
- Renaissance Ezzmamra

=== 2018-19 clubs ===
- Chabab Atlas Khénifra
- Racing Casablanca
- Raja Beni Mellal
- Chabab Ben Guerir
- Olympique Dcheira
- Wydad de Fès
- Maghreb de Fès
- Jeunesse Massira
- Union Sidi Kacem
- Association Salé
- Kénitra AC
- Ittihad Khemisset
- Wydad Témara
- JS de Kasbah Tadla
- Chabab Riadi Salmi
- Renaissance Ezzmamra

=== Location ===
Locations of the 2018–19 Botola 2 teams
Locations of the 2018–19 Botola 2 teams
