= 1970–71 Moroccan Throne Cup =

Tournament details
- Country: Morocco

Final positions
- Champions: FAR de Rabat

The 1970–71 season of the Moroccan Throne Cup is the 15th edition of the competition.

FAR de Rabat won the competition after beating Maghreb de Fès 8–7 on penalties after a 1–1 draw in the final, played at the Stade d'honneur in Casablanca. FAR de Rabat won the competition for the second time in their history.

== Tournament ==
=== Last 16 ===
Team 1	Team 2	Result
FAR de Rabat	Raja d'Agadir	2–0
Difaâ Hassani El Jadidi	Rapide Oued Zem	3–1
Racing de Casablanca	Fath Union Sport	1–1
Olympique Youssoufia	Tihad Sportif Casablanca	0–1
Union de Sidi Kacem	Raja Club Athletic	2–3
Maghreb de Fès	Hassania d'Agadir	2–1
Kawkab Marrakech	Nejm Shabab Bidawi	0–1
KAC Kénitra	Raja de Beni Mellal	0–1

=== Quarter-finals ===
Team 1	Team 2	Result
Racing de Casablanca	Raja de Beni Mellal	1–2
Difaâ Hassani El Jadidi	Union de Sidi Kacem	3–0
FAR de Rabat	Nejm Shabab Bidawi	1–0
Olympique Youssoufia	Maghreb de Fès	1–2

=== Semi-finals ===
Team 1	Team 2	Result
FAR de Rabat	Raja de Beni Mellal	1–1; 8–6 (pens)
Maghreb de Fès	Difaâ Hassani El Jadidi	4–4; 4–2 (pens)

=== Final ===
The final took place between the two winning semi-finalists, FAR de Rabat and Maghreb de Fès, on 5 September 1971 at the Stade d'honneur in Casablanca.

Moroccan Throne Cup
5 September 1971
Final

FAR de Rabat	1–1	Maghreb de Fès
	Report
Penalties
Penalty scored	8–7	Penalty scored Penalty missed

Stade d'honneur, Casablanca
Referee: Abdelkrim Ziani
