= 2013–14 Botola Pro =

Moroccan football league season

Botola
- Season: 2013–14
- Champions: Moghreb Tétouan
- Relegated: AS Salé; Wydad Fès
- Champions League: Moghreb Tétouan; Raja Casablanca
- Confederation Cup: FUS Rabat; RS Berkane
- Matches: 240
- Goals: 461 (1.92 per match)
- Top goalscorer: Zouhaur Naim; Zoumana Kone (11 goals)
- Biggest home win: Raja Casablanca 5-0 KAC Kénitra; Raja Casablanca 5-0 Moghreb Tétouan
- Biggest away win: Olympique Khouribga 0-4 Kawkab Marrakech
- Highest scoring: Hassania Agadir 3-4 Kawkab Marrakech; Hassania Agadir 4-3 Wydad Fès; Wydad Fès 3-4 Maghreb Fès

The 2013–14 Botola is the 57th season of the Moroccan Top League, but the 3rd under its new format of Moroccan Pro League.

== Overview ==
=== Promotion and relegation ===
Teams promoted from 2012–13 Botola 2

- KAC Marrakech
- Association Salé

Teams relegated to 2013–14 Botola 2

- CODM de Meknès
- Raja Beni Mellal

== League table ==
Pos	Team	Pld	W	D	L	GF	GA	GD	Pts	Qualification or relegation
1	Moghreb Tétouan (C)	30	16	10	4	36	25	+11	58	Qualification to Club World Cup and Champions League
2	Raja Casablanca	30	16	7	7	40	15	+25	55	Qualification to Champions League
3	FUS Rabat	30	12	12	6	31	21	+10	48	Qualification to Confederation Cup (Note: RSB Berkane qualified for the 2015 CAF Confederation Cup as runners-up of the 2014 Coupe du Trône since winners FUS de Rabat qualified for the 2015 CAF Confederation Cup.)
4	Kawkab Marrakech	30	11	15	4	30	19	+11	48	
5	Difaâ El Jadida	30	10	15	5	30	19	+11	45	
6	Wydad Casablanca	30	10	13	7	34	29	+5	43	
7	FAR Rabat	30	9	12	9	30	30	0	39	
8	Hassania Agadir	30	10	8	12	36	43	−7	38	
9	RSB Berkane	30	6	17	7	24	22	+2	35	Qualification to Confederation Cup
10	Chabab Rif Hoceima	30	10	6	14	23	32	−9	35 (Note: CRA 1 point deducted because of one match being awarded against them.)	
11	Olympic Safi	30	7	12	11	28	30	−2	33	
12	KAC Kénitra	30	6	14	10	21	31	−10	32	
13	Maghreb Fès	30	7	10	13	27	36	−9	31	
14	Olympique Khouribga	30	8	9	13	20	35	−15	31 (Note: OCK 2 points deducted because of two matches being awarded against them.)	
15	AS Salé (R)	30	6	11	13	25	33	−8	29	Relegation to 2014–15 Botola 2
16	Wydad Fès (R)	30	5	11	14	26	41	−15	26	Relegation to 2014–15 Botola 2

Updated to match(es) played on 26 May 2014. Source: Federation Rec.Sport.Soccer Statistics Foundation
Rules for classification: 1) points; 2) goal difference; 3) number of goals scored.
(C) Champions; (R) Relegated

== Season statistics ==
=== Top goalscorers ===
As of 26 May 2014.

Rank	Player	Club	Goals
1	(Ivory Coast) Zoumana Koné	HUS Agadir	11
1	(Morocco) Zouhair Naïm	MA Tetouan	11
3	(Morocco) Mouhcine Moutouali	Raja CA	9
4	(Morocco) Brahim El Bahri	Fath US	8
4	(Morocco) Mouhcine Iajour	Raja CA	8
4	(Central African Republic) Vianney Mabidé	Raja CA	8
4	(Morocco) Bilal Assoufi	Kénitra AC	8
4	(Morocco) Mehdi Naghmi	AS FAR	8
4	(Gabon) Malick Evouna	Wydad AC	8
4	(Ivory Coast) Patrick Kouakou	HUS Agadir	8
4	(Morocco) Ahmed Chagou	DH Jadida	8
