= Amal Club Belksiri =

Moroccan football club

- Full name: Amal Club Belksiri
- Founded: unknown
- Ground: Stade Municipal
- Capacity: unknown
- League: GNFA 1 Nord
Home colours	Away colours

Amal Club Belksiri, also called AC Kasri is a Moroccan football club currently playing in the third division.
