= Hassania Athletic Sidi Slimane =

Moroccan football club

Hassania Sidi Slimane
- Full name: Hassania Sidi Slimane
- Founded: unknown
- Ground: Stade Municipal
- Capacity: unknown
- League: GNFA 1 Nord
Home colours	Away colours

Hassania Sidi Slimane is a Moroccan football club, currently playing in the third division. The club is located in the town of Sidi Slimane.
