= Wifak Segangan =

Moroccan football club

- Full name: Wifak Sportif Seghanghan
- Founded: 1958
- League: GNFA 1 Est
Home colours	Away colours

Wifak Sportif Seghanghan is a Moroccan football club currently playing in the third division. The club was founded in 1958 and is located in the town of Segangan.
