= Mouloudia Marrakech =

Moroccan football club

Mouloudia Club de Marrakech or simply MC Marrakech is a Moroccan football club based in Marrakesh. It was established in 1948. The club plays in the GNFA 1, the equivalent of the third division.
