= Amateur National =

- Organising body: Royal Moroccan Football Federation; Ligue Nationale du Football Amateur
- Founded: 1922
- Country: Morocco
- Confederation: CAF
- Number of clubs: 16
- Level on pyramid: 3
- Promotion to: Botola Pro 2
- Relegation to: Amateurs I
- Domestic cup: Throne Cup
- Current champions: IZ Khemisset (2025-26)
- Website: lnfa.ma
- Current: 2026–27 Amateur National

Amateur National is the top division of the Moroccan Amateur League and the third level in the Moroccan football league system, positioned directly below Botola Pro 2.

== History ==
Before 2004, the third division was known as Rabita Football Amateur 1, and later as Groupement National de Football Amateurs 1. In 2015, administration was transferred to the National League of Amateur Football (LNFA).

Starting from the 2017–18 season, the competition was reorganized into a single nationwide group of 16 clubs.

== League Structure ==
The league operates on a standard promotion and relegation system:

- Promotion: The top two teams at the end of the season are promoted directly to Botola Pro 2.
- Relegation: The bottom two teams are relegated to Amateurs I (4th division).

== National Champions ==
=== From 2002 to 2007 ===
Year	Champion North/East	Champion South/Center
2002	RS Berkane	NS Marrakech
2003	HA Nador	UTS Rabat
2004	US Yacoub El Mansour	CAY Berrechid
2005	US Sidi Kacem	CWW Casablanca
2006	US Témara	Chabab Houara
2007	CR Al-Hoceima	Olympique Marrakech

=== From 2008 to 2009 ===
Year	North	Center	South	East
2008	Stade Marocain	Raja Beni Mellal	Olympique Marrakech	Wydad Fès
2009	CA Khénifra	JS Kasba Tadla	Olympique Youssoufia	Raja Al Hoceima

=== From 2010 to 2017 ===
Year	Champion North	Champion South
2010	HA Nador	USM Aït Melloul
2011	RS Berkane	Raja Beni Mellal
2012	USM Oujda	Olympique Marrakech
2013	CA Khénifra	Chabab Houara
2014	WS Temara	Olympique Dcheira
2015	CR Bernoussi	Olympique Marrakech
2016	US Sidi Kacem	RC Oued Zem
2017	USM Oujda	CJ Ben Guerir

=== Since 2017 ===
Since 2017, one unique group was created with 16 teams.

Year	Champion
2018	JS Soualem
2019	SCC Mohammédia
2020	UTS Rabat
2021	USM Oujda
2022	WS Témara
2023	KAC Marrakech
2024	Union Yacoub El Mansour
2025	WS Témara
2026	IZ Khemisset

== Relegated clubs ==
=== Relegated teams (from Botola Pro 2 to Amateur) ===
Season	Relegated from Botola Pro 2
1997–98	CR Bernoussi, CA Khenifra
1998–99	Chabab Hay El Hassani, Amjad Sidi Othman
1999–00	UTS Rabat, Najah Souss
2000–01	US Yacoub El Mansour, Chabab Hay El Hassani
2001–02	Sporting Salé (disbanded), CA Khénifra
2002–03	Raja Beni Mellal, US Sidi Kacem
2003–04	TAS Casablanca, Majd Casablanca
2004–05	US Yacoub Mansour, Wydad Fez
2005–06	NS Marrakech, FR Nador
2006–07	Stade Marocain, RS Berkane
2007–08	UTS Rabat, HA Nador
2008–09	Olympique Marrakech, CWW Casablanca
2009–10	CA Khénifra, RS Settat, US Sidi Kacem
2010–11	Raja Al Hoceima, IR Fkih Ben Salah, SCC Mohammedia, HA Nador
2011–12	Chabab Houara, Stade Marocain
2012–13	TAS Casablanca, Olympique Marrakech
2013–14	Rachad Bernoussi, USM Oujda
2014–15	Chabab Houara, Union Mohammedia
2015–16	Olympique Marrakech, COD Meknès
2016–17	USM Aït Melloul, US Témara
2017–18	Rachad Bernoussi, USM Oujda
2018–19	JS Massira, JS Kasba Tadla
2019–20	US Sidi Kacem, CR Al-Hoceima
2020–21	Kénitra AC, WS Temara
2021–22	TAS Casablanca, KAC Marrakech
2022–23	IZ Khemisset, WS Témara
2023–24	Ittifaq Marrakech, AS Salé
2024–25	CAY Berrechid, RC Oued Zem, OC Khouribga
2025–26	RAC Casablanca, Raja Beni Mellal
