= CWW Casablanca =

Moroccan football club

- Full name: Club Wafa Wydad Casablanca
- Short name: Wafa Wydad
- Founded: 1944
- Ground: Stade Tessema, Casablanca
- Capacity: 10,000
- League: Amateur National
- 2025–26: Amateurs I, 2nd of 16 (promoted via play-off)
Home colours	Away colours

Club Wafa Wydad Casablanca (نادي وفاء وداد), commonly known as CWW Casablanca or Wafa Wydad, is a Moroccan football club based in Casablanca, Morocco. Founded in 1944, the club competes in the Amateur National, the third tier of the Moroccan football league system.

== Home Ground ==
The club plays its home matches at Stade Tessema in Casablanca, which has a capacity of approximately 10,000 spectators.

== Sponsorship & Partnerships ==
The club has maintained local corporate partnerships, including a multi-year partnership with cooling solutions manufacturer Taqeef.

== Honours ==
- Amateurs I
  - Promoted: 2025–26 (Runner-up/Play-off)
