= USM Aït Melloul =

Moroccan football club

Union Aït Melloul
- Full name: Union Aït Melloul
- Founded: 1999
- Ground: Stade Municipal d'Aït Melloul
- Capacity: 5,000
- League: Amateurs I
- 2024-25: Amateurs I, 6th of 16
Home colours	Away colours

Union Aït Melloul is a Moroccan football club currently playing in Amateurs I. The club was founded in 1999 and is located in the town of Aït Melloul.

Assistant coach is Rachid Mediouni who started his football career in Ouijda and did well. After an agreement he moved to agadir Ait Melloul and studied for trainer coach. He passed the exams and started as a trainer and assistant coach at Ait Melloul and in 2014–15 they almost succeeded to promotion but Ouijda Meloudia took in the 85 min the points and was promoted.
