= Olympique Marrakech =

Moroccan football club

- Full name: Olympique Marrakech
- Founded: 2001
- League: National
- 2025-26: 12th
- Website: olympique-marrakech.com
Home colours	Away colours	Third colours

Olympique Marrakech (or Chez Ali Club de Marrakech previously) is a Moroccan football club based in Marrakesh. The club was founded in 2001.
