= Chabab Houara =

Moroccan football club

- Full name: Chabab Houara
- Founded: 1964
- Ground: Stade du 16 Novembre
- Capacity: 5,000
- League: Amateur National
- 2025–26: 11th
| Home colours | Away colours |

Chabab Houara is a Moroccan football club currently playing in the second division. The club was founded in 1964 and is located in the town of Ouled Teima in the region of Houara.

== Honours ==
- Moroccan GNFA 1 Championship: 1

2006
