= Fath Riadi de Nador =

Association football club in Morocco

Fath de Nador
- Full name: Fath de Nador
- Founded: 1971; 55 years ago
- Ground: Municipal Stadium Nador
- League: GNFA 1 Est
Home colours	Away colours	Third colours

Fath de Nador is a Moroccan football club currently playing in the GNFA 1, the third tier of Moroccan football. The club was founded in 1971 and they play at the Stade Municipal de Nador.
