= RCA Zemamra =

Moroccan football club

- Full name: Renaissance Club Athletic Zemamra
- Founded: 1977; 49 years ago
- Ground: Ahmed Choukri Stadium
- Capacity: 2,500
- Manager: Vacant
- League: Botola Pro
- 2025–26: Botola Pro, 11th of 16

Renaissance Club Athletic Zemamra (Arabic: نادي نهضة أتلتيك الزمامرة), known as Renaissance Zemamra or RCA Zemamra, is a football club based in Zemamra, Morocco. As of the 2026–27 season, it plays in the Botola Pro, Morocco's first tier division.

== History ==
After winning the 2018–19 Botola 2, the club gained promotion to Botola for the first time in their history. On 28 June 2022, Zemamra signed former A.C. Milan player, Hachim Mastour.

On 18 June 2023, Zemamra was promoted back to Botola after winning the 2022–23 Botola 2 title.

== Honours ==
- Botola 2
  - Winners (2): 2018–19, 2022–23
