= Olympique Youssoufia =

Moroccan football club

- Full name: Olympique Youssoufia
- Founded: 1933
- League: GNFA 1 Sud
Home colours	Away colours

Olympique Youssoufia is a Moroccan football club currently playing in the third division.

It was founded in 1933 in the club's home city Youssoufia and is until now the only professional soccer club founded in the city.
