= USM d'Oujda =

Moroccan football club

USM Oujda
- Full name: Union Sportive Musulmane d'Oujda
- Founded: 1958; 68 years ago
- Ground: Stade Municipal d'Oujda
- Capacity: 10,000
- League: Botola Pro 2
- 2024–25: Botola Pro 2, 11th of 16
Home colours	Away colours	Third colours

Union Sportive Musulmane d'Oujda or simly USM Oujda, called USMO for a short is a Moroccan football club currently playing in Botola Pro 2. The club was founded in 1958 and is located in the city of Oujda, Morocco The best player to play for this team would be Boussif Berhil. He scored many goals for USMO as a center forward. One time, he scored a bicycle kick on the top left corner. Another player is Mohamed Hassan, a defender who did many clean sheets back in the day.
