= RC Oued Zem =

Moroccan football club

- Full name: Rapide Club Oued Zem
- Founded: 15 May 1926; 100 years ago
- Ground: Stade Municipal
- Capacity: 5,000
- Chairman: Amine Nouara
- Manager: Mounir Chebil
- League: National
- 2025-26: 3rd
Home colours	Away colours	Third colours

Rapide Club Oued Zem is a Moroccan football club currently playing in the National.
