= CJ Ben Guerir =

Moroccan football club

Chabab Ben Guerir
- Full name: Club Jeunesse Ben Guerir
- Founded: 1952; 74 years ago
- Ground: Stade Municipal
- Capacity: 4,000
- Chairman: M'hamed Hadek
- League: Botola Pro 2
- 2024–25: Botola Pro 2, 8th of 16
Home colours	Away colours	Third colours

Chabab Ben Guerir is a Moroccan football club currently playing in the Botola Pro 2. Club Jeunesse Ben Guerir (CJBG) was founded in 1952 and is located in the town of Ben Guerir, Morocco. They play in the Stade Municipal Ben Guerir.

== Palmares ==
- Botola Amt1 (1)
  - Champion : 2016/17
- Moroccan Elite Cup U-14
  - Runner-up : 2026
