= US Temara =

Moroccan football club

- Full name: Union Sprtive de Temara
- Founded: 1969
- League: Amateurs I
- 2024-25: National, 13th of 16 (relegated via play-off)
Home colours	Away colours

Union Sprtive de Temara is a Moroccan football club currently playing in the Amateurs I.
