= CR Al Hoceima =

Moroccan football club

CR Al-Hoceima
- Full name: Chabab Rif Al Hoceima
- Founded: 1953; 73 years ago
- Ground: Stade Mimoun Al Arsi
- Capacity: 12,000
- Chairman: Hassan El Bachrioui
- Manager: Abdessamad El Mobaraky
- League: Amateurs I
- 2024–25: Amateurs II, 1st of 16 (promoted)
- Website: cra-hoceima.com
Home colours	Away colours	Third colours

Chabab Rif Al-Hoceima, (Tarifit: ⵉⵍⵎⵥⵉⵢⵏ ⵏ ⴰⵔⵔⵉⴼ ⵏ ⵍⵃⵓⵙⵉⵎⴰ) (Arabic: شباب الريف الحسيمي) also referred to as CRA, is a Moroccan football club based in Al Hoceima, a Riffian city in northern Morocco. The club was founded in 1953 and is best known for their 2010 promotion to the Botola Pro, the top tier league in Moroccan football league system.

== History ==
In 2007, Chabab Rif Al Hoceima promoted to the GNF 2 for the third time in their history. Three years later, in 2010, the team was promoted, for the first time in history, to the Botola Pro, the highest division in Moroccan professional football (previously known as GNF 1). The club remained in this division until 2019, when it degraded to the Amateur League.

Up until 2023, Chabab Rif Al Hoceima played its matches in Stade Mimoun Al Arsi, which houses a capacity of 12,000 seats. In 2023, the football club will move to a newly constructed Grand Stade de Al Hoceima, which has a capacity of 35,000 seats, roughly triple the capacity of the old stadium.

== Managers ==
- (Morocco) Mustapha Darss (Oct 10, 2012 – March 17, 2013)
- (Morocco) Mohamed Said Zekri (March 20, 2013 – July 1, 2013)
- (Switzerland) Christian Zermatten (July 7, 2013 – Oct 9, 2013)
- (Morocco) El Houssaine Ouchla (Oct 1, 2013 – Jan 10, 2014)
- (Morocco) Hassan Regragui (Jan 22, 2014–2015)
- (Morocco) Taha El Mess (Dec 30, 2015–201?)
- (Morocco) / (Netherlands) Mimoun Ouaali (March–September 2018)
