= CR Bernoussi =

Association football club in Morocco

Rachad Bernoussi
- Full name: Club Rachad Bernoussi
- Founded: 1961; 65 years ago
- Ground: Sidi Bernoussi Complex, Casablanca
- Capacity: 9,000
- Chairman: Hicham Chbora
- League: Amateurs I North
- 2025–26: 15th of 16 (relegated)
Home colours	Away colours

Club Rachad Bernoussi is a Moroccan football club currently playing in the Amateurs I. The club was founded in 1961 and is located in the town of Casablanca. They play in the Complexe Bernoussi, and their president is Hicham Chbora..

== Performance in CAF competitions ==
- CAF Confederation Cup: 1 appearance

2008 – First Round

== Notable players ==
- (United Kingdom) Suleiman Bolatsa Bakalandwa
- (France) Jean-Michel Joachim
- (Somalia) Yonis Farah
