= Stade Marocain =

Moroccan football club

- Full name: Club Stade Marocain
- Founded: 1919; 107 years ago
- Ground: Ahmed Achhoud Stadium
- Capacity: 5,000
- League: Botola Pro 2
- 2025–26: Botola Pro 2, 7th of 16
- Website: https://clubstademarocain.ma/
Home colours	Away colours	Third colours

Stade Marocain is a Moroccan professional football club that competes in the Botola Pro 2. Founded in 1919, the club uses Stade Ahmed Achhoud as home venue. Stade Marocain is one of four clubs based in the capital of Morocco, Rabat, others being FAR Rabat, UTS Rabat, and FUS de Rabat.

== Honours ==
- Botola
  - Winners (3): 1928, 1931, 1945
  - Runner-up (1): 1964
- Moroccan Cup
  - Winners (1): 1951
- Gil Super Cup
  - Winners (1): 1944
  - Runner-up (3): 1935, 1939, 1942
- Botola 2
  - Winners (2): 1947, 1961
- North African Championship
  - Runner-up (1): 1931
