= Tihad AS =

Moroccan football club

TAS Casablanca
- Full name: Tihad Athletic Sport Casablanca
- Short name: TAS
- Founded: 1947; 79 years ago
- League: Amateurs II
- 2025–26: Amateurs I, 16th of 16 (relegated)
Home colours	Away colours	Third colours

Tihad Athletic Sport Casablanca (Arabic: نادي الاتحاد البيضاوي) is a Moroccan football club based in Casablanca, they are one of the most popular behind Wydad Casablanca, Raja Casablanca and Racing de Casablanca.

== History ==
TAS de Casablanca won their first major title when they beat Hassania Agadir 2–1 in the final to win the 2019 Throne Cup. By doing so, they became one of only three teams that have won the Throne Cup title while not playing in the top flight (alongside fellow Casablanca teams CO Casablanca and Majd Al Madina).

As a result, TAS de Casablanca earned the right to participate in the 2020-21 CAF Confederation Cup for the first time, while playing in the Moroccan Botola Pro League 2. They made history when they played and won their first match ever in a continental competition. The first leg was played in Gambia versus Gamtel and the visitors won 1–0. The Moroccans reached the play-off round, eventually losing to Zambian side Nkana 2–3 on aggregate, thereby narrowly missing out on a spot in the group stage.

== Honours ==
- Moroccan Throne Cup
  - Champions (1): 2018–19
