= CAY Berrechid =

Moroccan football club

Youssoufia Berrechid
- Full name: Club Athletic Youssoufia Berrechid
- Founded: 1927; 99 years ago
- Ground: Berrechid Municipal Stadium; Al Razi Stadium (since 2026)
- Capacity: 5,000; 1,000
- League: Amateurs I South
- 2025–26: National, 16th of 16 (relegated)
Home colours	Away colours	Third colours

Club Athletic Youssoufia Berrechid, usually known simply as Youssoufia Berrechid, is a Moroccan football club based in Berrechid, Morocco. The club was founded in 1927 and their stadium is called Berrechid Municipal Stadium. They currently play in Amateurs I, the Fourth tier of Moroccan football.

== History ==
On 18 June 2023, Youssoufia Berrechid was promoted back to Botola after placing second in the 2022–23 Botola 2.

== Current squad ==
As of 25 December 2021

Note: Flags indicate national team as defined under FIFA eligibility rules; some limited exceptions apply. Players may hold more than one non-FIFA nationality.

No.	Pos.	Nation	Player
1	GK	MAR	Achraf Hilali
2	DF	MAR	Hicham Taik
3	DF	MAR	Driss El Abdi
4	MF	MAR	Soufian Aznabet
5	MF	MAR	Abdelfettah Ait Ahmed
6	MF	MAR	Achraf El Idrissi
7	FW	MAR	Karim Hachimi
8	MF	MAR	Hamza Buihamghet
9	FW	MAR	Younes Rachid
10	MF	MAR	Oussama Chaibi
11	FW	MAR	Charki El Bahri
12	GK	MAR	Houssine Chadli
13	FW	CIV	Bi Thomas Gonazo
15	MF	MAR	Abdelkhalek Ait Ourehbi
17	MF	MAR	Said Aoufir

No.	Pos.	Nation	Player
19	DF	MAR	Karim El Oualadi
20	MF	MAR	Hamza Hsaini
23	DF	CIV	Assane Diabagate
24	DF	MAR	Oussama El Ouattassi
28	MF	MAR	Ayoub Jiouki
31	DF	MAR	Yacine Wakili
33	MF	MAR	Achraf Hmaidou
37	FW	MAR	Mouad Fekkak
50	DF	MAR	Mohammed Tahiri
55	MF	MAR	Soufiane Saadane
57	DF	MAR	Ibrahim Najm Eddine
77	FW	MAR	Abdelouahed Hasty
90	MF	MAR	Mounir Labaioui
91	FW	MAR	Mouhcine Naciri
93	GK	MAR	Salaheddine Chihab
97	FW	MAR	Mohammed Ben Hssain

== Achievements ==
- Moroccan GNFA 1 Championship: 1

2005
