= Raja Beni Mellal =

Moroccan football club

- Full name: Raja Beni Mellal
- Nicknames: Rajae Attarikh (Historic Raja); Fares Ain Asserdoun (Ain Asserdoun Knight); Star Boys (supporters)
- Founded: 1956; 70 years ago
- Ground: Stade d'Honneur
- Capacity: 15,000
- Chairman: Khalid Haji
- League: Amateur National
- 2025–26: Botola Pro 2, 15th of 16 (relegated)
Home colours	Away colours	Third colours

Raja Beni Mellal is a Moroccan football club currently playing in National, The club was founded in 1956 and is based in the city of Beni Mellal.

== History ==
Raja Beni Mellal was founded in 1956 by Monsieur Abdellatif Mesfioui after the alliance of a set of clubs of the city of Beni Mellal they included the Ittihad Al Mellali et La Mouloudia.

Abdellatif Mesfioui was the first president of the club following the merger between the Ittihad and Mouloudia. The club businesses still have the final of the Champions Cup Maghreb against Club Africain. Best Presidents of the club's history to date were Lhaj Jilali Lasri (1973–1974 and 1974–1975) and his son Lhaj Abdelwahed Lasri (2010–2011 and 2011–2012) where during their activity there have been the best four seasons in the history of Raja Beni Mellal.

== Honours ==
=== Domestic ===
==== League ====
- Botola
  - Winners (1): 1973–74
- Botola 2
  - Winners (1): 2011–12
  - Runners-up (2): 1997–98, 2018–19
- Amateurs
  - Winners (2): 2007–08, 2010–11

==== Cup ====
- Throne Cup
  - Semi-finalists (5): 1964–65, 1970–71, 1994–95, 2012–13, 2019–20
- Excellence Cup
  - Group stage: 2024–25

=== International ===
- Maghreb Champions Cup
  - Runners-up (1): 1974–75
- Mohammed V Cup
  - Semi-finalists (1): 1974
