= JS Massira =

Football club in Western Sahara

- Full name: Jeunesse Sportive d'El Massira
- Founded: 1977; 49 years ago
- Ground: Sheikh Mohamed Laghdaf Stadium, Laâyoune, Western Sahara
- Capacity: 15,000
- Chairman: Hassan Ederham
- Manager: Fakhreddine Rajhi
- League: Botola Pro 2
- 2025–26: Botola Pro 2, 4th of 16
Home colours	Away colours	Third colours

Jeunesse Sportive d'El Massira (Arabic: نادي شباب المسيرة) is a football club based in Laâyoune, Western Sahara. The club was founded in 1977 and plays in the Botola Pro 2.

== Current squad ==
Note: Flags indicate national team as defined under FIFA eligibility rules; some limited exceptions apply. Players may hold more than one non-FIFA nationality.

No.	Pos.	Nation	Player
—	GK	MAR	Mansour Achoubi
—	GK	MAR	Younes Ataba
—	GK	MAR	Ali Chaabani
—	GK	MAR	Younes Sahim
—	DF	MAR	Noureddine Ait Abdelouahed
—	DF	MAR	Jamaledinne El Omari
—	DF	MAR	Mehdi Elhaki
—	DF	MAR	Abdelouahab Jdiya
—	DF	MAR	Mohamed Karkouri
—	DF	MAR	Mourad Lemsen
—	MF	MAR	Bilal Tehali

No.	Pos.	Nation	Player
—	MF	MAR	Negeema Barfy
—	MF	MAR	Khalid Berguige
—	MF	MAR	Moustapha Flissate
—	MF	MAR	Younes Menkari (Captain)
—	FW	MAR	Soulaymane El Khatari
—	FW	CGO	Jonathan Mbou
—	FW	SEN	Patrick Ndai
—	FW	NGA	Erique Obina Nouaymo
—	FW	MAR	Aziz Sbai
—	FW	CMR	Eustache Wansi

== Honours ==
- Promotion to Botola/GNF 1: 1

1994/95

== Kits sponsor ==
- Adidas
