= UTS Rabat =

Moroccan football club

- Full name: Union Touarga Sport
- Short name: UTS
- Founded: 1971; 55 years ago
- Ground: Al Medina Stadium
- Capacity: 18,000
- President: Taher Hammi
- Manager: Guglielmo Arena
- League: Botola Pro
- 2025–26: Botola Pro, 13th of 16
- Website: https://touargaclub.ma/en/
Home colours	Away colours

Union Touarga Sport or UTS is a professional football club based in the Touarga district of Rabat, Morocco, that competes in Botola Pro, the top flight of Moroccan football. The club was founded in 1971.

== History ==
It played in the Amateur1 Championship in 2019-2020, where it was crowned champion. The club moved up to Botola Pro 2 in the 2020-2021 season and now plays in the elite league.

On 26 June 2025, US Touarga fell short in the inaugural Excellence Cup final, suffering a narrow 2–1 defeat to Olympique Dcheira.

== Current squad ==
As of 2 October 2026

Note: Flags indicate national team as defined under FIFA eligibility rules; some limited exceptions apply. Players may hold more than one non-FIFA nationality.

No.	Pos.	Nation	Player
1	GK	MAR	Reda Asmama
2	DF	MAR	Youness Akharraz
3	DF	MAR	Anas Nanah
4	DF	POR	Tahar El Khalej
5	DF	MAR	Yassine El Khalej
6	MF	POR	Danny
9	FW	MAR	Nasreddine Moustaghfir
13	DF	MAR	Youssef Kajai
14	FW	MAR	Abdelkabir El Ouadi
15	DF	MAR	Hamza Regragui
16	GK	MAR	Houssam Bouelainine
18	MF	MAR	Omar Arjoune
19	FW	CIV	Samuel Tebily

No.	Pos.	Nation	Player
20	FW	MAR	Saad Lotfi
21	MF	MAR	Redouan Ait Lamkadem
22	FW	MAR	Mouad Dahak
27	FW	MAR	Ayoub Ajerrar
28	DF	MAR	Khalid Kasbi
29	FW	MAR	Abdeljalil Chaynane
30	DF	MAR	Oussama Jalfate
31	MF	MAR	Walid Rhailouf
32	MF	MAR	Adam Chakir
37	FW	MAR	Salim Ghazzani
41	DF	MAR	Mehdi Ashabi
45	MF	CIV	Konan Gatou Koffi
50	GK	MAR	Walid Hasbi

During the second half of the 2025–26 season, following an injury to starting goalkeeper Abderrahman El Houasli, backup keeper Houssam Bouelainine stepped into the starting lineup.

== Honours ==
- Botola Pro 2
  - Winners (2): 1979–80, 1985–86
  - Runners-up (2): 2003–04, 2021–22
- National
  - Winners (3): 1978–77, 2002–03, 2019–20
- Moroccan Excellence Cup
  - Runners-up (1): 2024–25
