= US Sidi Kacem =

Moroccan football club

- Full name: Union Sportive de Sidi Kacem
- Founded: 1927
- League: GNF 2
- Website: union-sidi-kacem.com
Home colours	Away colours	Third colours

Union Sportive de Sidi Kacem is a Moroccan football club currently playing in the second division and was founded in 1927 in Sidi Kacem. Most of the club's achievements came in the 1970s and 1980s after gaining promotion to the GNF 1 in 1967. The club plays at the Colonel Abdelkader Allam Stadium.

== Honours ==
- Moroccan Championship
  - Runners-up (1): 1970
- Moroccan GNF 2 Championship
  - Winners (2): 1967, 1996
- Moroccan GNFA 1 Championship
  - Winners (1): 2005
- Coupe du Trône
  - Runners-up (3): 1950, 1975, 1980
