= IZ Khemisset =

Moroccan football club

Ittihad Khemisset
- Full name: Ittihad Zemmouri Khemisset
- Nicknames: Cavaliers of Zemmour, IZK
- Founded: 1941; 85 years ago
- Ground: Stade du 18 novembre
- Capacity: 5,000
- Chairman: Hassan Elfilali
- Manager: Fouad Sahabi
- League: Botola Pro 2
- 2025–26: National, 1st of 16 (Champions, promoted)

Ittihad Zemmouri Khemisset (Arabic: اتحاد الخميسات) is a Moroccan football club based in Khemisset. The club was founded in 1941. They play their home games at 18 November Stadium.

== Honours ==
- Moroccan League First Division
  - Runners-up (1): 2008
- Throne Cup
  - Runners-up (1): 1973
- GNF 2 Moroccan Championship
  - Runners-up (1): 2000

== Performance in CAF competitions ==
- CAF Champions League: 1 appearance

2009 – 2nd Round

== Former managers ==
- (Romania) Eugen Moldovan (2004–05)
- (Morocco) Hussein Ammouta (2005–08)
- (Morocco) Jawad Milani (2015–19)
- (Morocco) Mouloud Moudakkar (2022–23)
