= Olympique Dcheira =

Moroccan football club

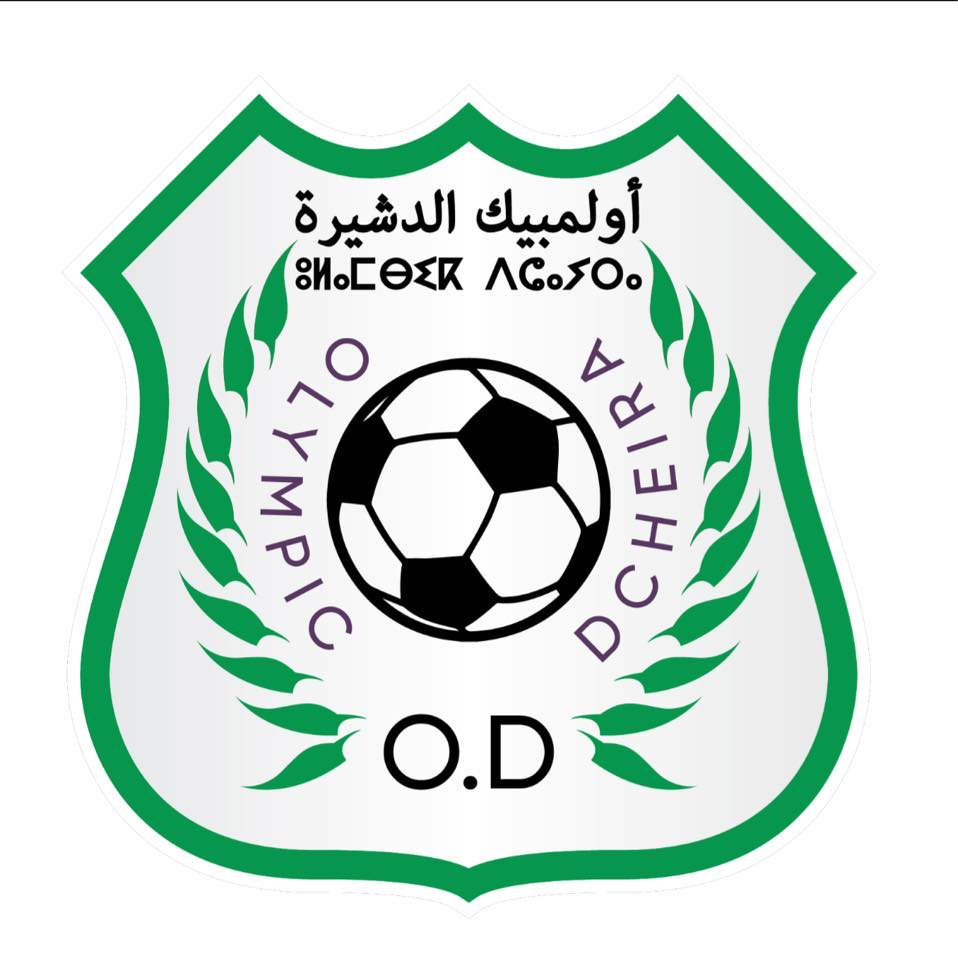
- Full name: Olympique Dcheira
- Short name: OD
- Founded: 1940; 86 years ago
- Manager: Hicham Aboucherouane
- League: Botola Pro 2
- 2025–26: Botola Pro, 14th of 16 (relegated via play-off)
Home colours	Away colours

Olympique Dcheira (Tachelhit: ⵓⵍⴰⵎⴱⴱⵉⴽ ⴷⴷⵛⴰⵢⵔⴰ) (Arabic: أولمبيك الدشيرة) is a Moroccan sports club from the city of Dcheira El Jihadia, located on the outskirts of Agadir in the Souss-Massa region. The club currently competes in the Botola Pro 2 after being relegated from the Botola Pro in the 2025–26 season.

== History ==
Established in 1940, the club is renowned for its strong development of local players and its participation in national championships. For years, it competed in the second division of the professional league, achieving promotion to the Botola Pro for the first time in its history in 2025.

=== Dcheira Secures First-Ever Promotion ===
With 49 points and a third-place finish in the 2024–2025 second division, Olympique Dcheira qualified for the playoffs under the new promotion system. With goals from Soufiane Jazouli and Mohamed Adjar, they overcame a 2–1 home deficit against Chabab Soualem in the first leg to win 3–0 away and secure a 4–2 aggregate victory. Their maiden appearance in the top division following this historic promotion is a momentous moment for both the club and the Souss-Massa area.

On 26 June 2025, Olympic Dcheira clinched the inaugural Excellence Cup title with a 2–1 victory over US Touarga in the final. On 12 September 2025, Olympic Dcheira played its first-ever match in the Botola, resulting in a 4–0 loss against RS Berkane. In their next match against US Touarga, the game ended 1–1, marking their first-ever point.

On 27 September 2025, Olympique Dcheira earned their first-ever victory in the Moroccan top flight, defeating Kawkab Marrakech 2–1 at the Grand Stadium of Agadir in a Matchweek 3 fixture of the Botola Pro.

On 21 July 2026, despite qualifying for the top league for the first time, Olympique Dcheira was relegated to the second division after losing the promotion/relegation play-offs against Amal Tiznit.

== Honours ==
- Moroccan Excellence Cup
  - Champions: 2025
