= CA Khénifra =

Moroccan football club

Chabab Atlas Khénifra
- Full name: Chabab Atlas Khénifra
- Founded: 1943; 83 years ago
- Ground: Stade Municipal
- Capacity: 5,000
- Manager: Kamel Zouaghi
- League: Botola Pro 2
- 2025–26: Botola Pro 2, 5th of 16
Home colours	Away colours	Third colours

Chabab Atlas Khénifra (Tamazight: ⵉⵄⵔⵔⵉⵎⵏ ⵏ ⵡⴰⵟⵍⴰⵙ ⵅⵏⵉⴼⵔⴰ) (Arabic: شباب أطلس خنيفرة) is a Moroccan football club currently playing in the Botola Pro 2. The club is located in the town of Khénifra.
