= Racing de Casablanca =

Moroccan football club

Racing AC
- Full name: Racing Athletic Club
- Founded: 1917; 109 years ago
- Ground: Stade Père-Jégo
- Capacity: 5,000
- League: Amateur National
- 2025-26: Botola Pro 2, 16th of 16 (relegated)
Home colours	Away colours	Third colours

Racing Athletic Club Casablanca (Arabic: نادي الرسينغ الرياضي) is a Moroccan football club currently playing in the National. The club was founded in 1917 under the name of Racing Athlétic de Casablanca, but in 1969 the name was changed to Association des Douanes Marocains (ADM). In the 1980s the name was changed back to its original format.

== Honours ==
- Botola:
  - Winners (3): 1945, 1954, 1972
- Throne Cup:
  - Winners (1): 1968
- Moroccan Elite Cup:
  - Winners (1): 1954
- Season Opening Cup:
  - Winners (3): 1942, 1945, 1953
- Botola 2:
  - Winners (3): 1931–32, 1943–44, 1999–2000
