= 2016–17 Botola Pro =

Moroccan football league season

Botola
- Season: 2016–17
- Champions: Wydad Casablanca; 19th title
- Relegated: KAC Kénitra; JS de Kasbah Tadla
- Champions League: Wydad Casablanca; Difaâ El Jadidi
- Confederation Cup: Raja Casablanca; RSB Berkane
- Matches: 240
- Goals: 534 (2.23 per match)
- Top goalscorer: William Jebor (19 goals)
- Biggest home win: DH El Jadida 6–1 JS Kasbah Tadla (21 May 2017)
- Biggest away win: AS FAR 0–5 Wydad AC (23 October 2016)
- Highest scoring: DH El Jadida 6–1 JS Kasbah Tadla (21 May 2017)
- Longest winning run: 6 matches Wydad AC
- Longest unbeaten run: 17 matches DH El Jadidi
- Longest winless run: 12 matches JS Kasbah Tadla
- Longest losing run: 5 matches KAC Marrakesh

The 2016–17 Botola, also known as Botola Maroc Telecom for sponsorship reasons, is the 60th season of the Premier League and the 6th under its new format of Moroccan Pro League, the top Moroccan professional league for association football clubs, since its establishment in 1915. The fixtures were announced on 2 August 2016. The season started on 27 August 2016 and may be ended on 28 May 2017.

FUS Rabat came into the season as defending champions of the 2015–16 season. Chabab Atlas Khénifra and Chabab Kasbah Tadla entered as the two promoted teams from the 2015–16 GNF 2.

Wydad Casablanca won the league for a record 19th time in Botola history after beating Olympic Safi on 17 May 2017.

== Teams ==
=== Stadium and locations ===
Locations of the 2016–17 Botola teams

Team	Acronym	Location	Stadium	Capacity
Chabab Atlas Khénifra	CAK	Khenifra	Stade Municipal	5,000
Chabab Rif Al Hoceima	CRA	Al Hoceima	Stade Mimoun Al Arsi	12,000
Difaâ El Jadidi	DHJ	El Jadida	Stade El Abdi	15,000
Association sportive des FAR	AS FAR	Rabat	Stade Moulay Abdellah	52,000
Fath Union Sport	FUS	Rabat	Stade de FUS	15,000
Hassania Agadir	HUSA	Agadir	Stade Adrar	45,480
IR Tanger	IRT	Tanger	Grand Stade de Tanger	45,000
JS de Kasbah Tadla	JSKT	Kasba Tadla	Complexe Sportif Municipal	5,000
KAC Kénitra	KAC	Kenitra	Stade Municipal (Kenitra)	15,000
Kawkab Marrakech	KACM	Marrakesh	Stade de Marrakech	45,240
Moghreb Tétouan	MAT	Tétouan	Saniat Rmel	15,000
Olympic Safi	OCS	Safi	Stade El Massira	10,000
Olympique Khouribga	OCK	Khouribga	Complexe OCP	10,000
Raja Casablanca	RCA	Casablanca	Stade Mohamed V	67,000
RSB Berkane	RSB	Berkane	Stade Municipal	15,000
Wydad Casablanca	WAC	Casablanca	Stade Mohamed V	67,000

=== Personnel and kits ===
Teams	Managers	Kit manufacturer	Shirt sponsor
Chabab Atlas Khénifra	(Morocco) Samir Yaich	Bang Sports	
Chabab Rif Al Hoceima	(Morocco) Youssef Fertout	Bang Sports	Al Omrane, CGI
Difaâ El Jadidi	(Morocco) Abderrahim Talib	Bang Sports	Alitkane, innjoo, Radio Mars, TGCC^{1}
Association sportive des FAR	(Morocco) Aziz El Amri	Uhlsport	
FUS Rabat	(Morocco) Walid Regragui	Uhlsport	Emaar, Novec^{1}, LafargeHolcim^{2}^{3}
Hassania Agadir	(Spain) Francisco Javier Bernal	Uhlsport	Afriquia, Skoda^{1}, Souss-Massa^{2}, Joly^{3}
IR Tanger	(Morocco) Bachir Bouita	Bang Sports	University of New England, APM Terminals
JS de Kasbah Tadla	(Morocco) Abderrazak Khairi	Legea	Syron
KAC Kénitra	(Morocco) Hassan Ajenoui		
Kawkab Marrakesh	(Morocco) Youssef Meriana	Puma	Poste Maroc, Sanad, CitySport, Menara Mall^{1}
Moghreb Tétouan	(Morocco) Amin Erbati (interim)	King Sports Maroc	Halib Tetaouen, Radio Mars
OC Khouribga	(Algeria) Azzedine Aït Djoudi	Bang Sports	
Olympic Safi	(Morocco) Mohamed Amine Benhachem	Uhlsport	Fitco
Raja Casablanca	(Morocco) Mohamed Fakhir	Adidas	Siera, Nor'Dar, CitySport, Hyundai^{1}, MarsaMaroc^{2}^{3}, Atlanta Assurances^{2}^{3}
RSB Berkane	(Morocco) Rachid Taoussi	Bang Sports	
Wydad Casablanca	(Morocco) Hussein Amotta	Adidas	Ingelec

1. On the back of shirt.
2. On the sleeves.
3. On the shorts.

- Maroc Telecom is a sponsor for all the league's teams.
- Additionally, referee kits are made by Adidas.

=== Managerial changes ===
Teams	Outgoing manager	Manner of departure	Date of vacancy	Incoming manager	Date of appointment
KAC Kénitra	(Morocco) Samir Yaich	Sacked	3 June 2016	(Morocco) Jamal Faouzi	17 July 2016
RSB Berkane	(France) Bertrand Marchand	End of contract	1 July 2016	(Algeria) Miloud Hamdi	14 July 2016
Chabab Rif Al Hoceima	(Morocco) Fouad Sahabi	End of contract	22 July 2016	(France) Dominique Bijotat	22 July 2016
Raja Casablanca	(Morocco) Rachid Taoussi	Sacked	7 August 2016	(Morocco) Mohamed Fakhir	9 August 2016
RSB Berkane	(Algeria) Miloud Hamdi	Contract termination	27 August 2016	(Morocco) Rachid Taoussi	31 August 2016
Wydad Casablanca	(Wales) John Toshack	Sacked	16 September 2016	(France) Sébastien Desabre	20 September 2016
KAC Kénitra	(Morocco) Jamal Faouzi	Resigned	17 September 2016	(France) Jean-Guy Wallemme	21 September 2016
Kawkab Marrakesh	(Morocco) Hassan Benabicha	Contract termination	27 September 2016	(Morocco) Fouad Sahabi	28 September 2016
Chabab Atlas Khénifra	(Morocco) Mohamed Bouthir	Sacked	28 September 2016	(Morocco) Samir Yaich	28 September 2016
Association sportive des FAR	(Morocco) Abdelmalek El Aziz	Sacked	24 October 2016	(Morocco) Aziz El Amri	24 October 2016
Chabab Rif Al Hoceima	(France) Dominique Bijotat	Resigned	3 November 2016	(Morocco) Said Zekri (interim)	15 November 2016
OC Khouribga	(Morocco) Youssef El Mrini	Resigned	8 November 2016	(Algeria) Azzedine Aït Djoudi	14 November 2016
Olympic Safi	(Morocco) Hicham Dmii	Contract termination	19 November 2016	(Morocco) Mohamed Amine Benhachem	25 November 2016
KAC Kénitra	(France) Jean-Guy Wallemme	Sacked	23 November 2016	(Morocco) Youssef El Mrini	23 November 2016
Chabab Rif Al Hoceima	(Morocco) Said Zekri (interim)	End of tenure as caretaker	15 December 2016	(Spain) Mohamed Lahcen Ahmed	15 December 2016
Kawkab Marrakesh	(Morocco) Fouad Sahabi	Sacked	25 December 2016	(Morocco) Ahmed Bahja	27 December 2016
Wydad Casablanca	(France) Sébastien Desabre	Sacked	6 January 2017	(Morocco) Hussein Amotta	6 January 2017
Chabab Rif Al Hoceima	(Spain) Mohamed Lahcen Ahmed	Sacked	8 January 2017	(Morocco) Youssef Fertout	8 January 2016
KAC Kénitra	(Morocco) Youssef El Mrini	Sacked	10 February 2017	(Morocco) Hassan Ajenoui	19 February 2017
JS de Kasbah Tadla	(Morocco) Hicham Eladrissi	Sacked	26 February 2017	(Morocco) Abderrazak Khairi	7 March 2017
Hassania Agadir	(Morocco) Abdelhadi Sektioui	Resigned	3 April 2017	(Morocco) Abdelkbir Meziane (interim)	5 April 2017
IR Tanger	(Algeria) Abdelhak Benchikha	Contract termination	16 April 2017	(Morocco) Mohamed Sabek (interim)	16 April 2017
Hassania Agadir	(Morocco) Abdelkbir Meziane (interim)	End of tenure as caretaker	26 April 2017	(Spain) Francisco Javier Bernal	26 April 2017
Kawkab Marrakesh	(Morocco) Ahmed Bahja	Sacked	29 April 2017	(Morocco) Youssef Meriana	1 May 2017
IR Tanger	(Morocco) Mohamed Sabek (interim)	End of tenure as caretaker	30 April 2017	(Morocco) Bachir Bouita	3 May 2017
Moghreb Tétouan	(Spain) Sergio Lobera	Sacked	1 May 2017	(Morocco) Amin Erbati (interim)	1 May 2017

== Results ==
=== League table ===
Pos	Team	Pld	W	D	L	GF	GA	GD	Pts	Qualification or relegation
1	Wydad Casablanca (C)	30	19	9	2	50	24	+26	66	Qualification to the CAF Champions League
2	Difaâ El Jadidi	30	16	11	3	45	23	+22	59	Qualification to the CAF Champions League
3	Raja Casablanca	30	15	12	3	42	17	+25	57	Qualification to the CAF Confederation Cup
4	RS Berkane	30	14	9	7	30	16	+14	51	Qualification to the CAF Confederation Cup
5	IR Tanger	30	12	9	9	33	25	+8	45	
6	AS FAR	30	11	11	8	42	39	+3	44	
7	FUS Rabat	30	11	7	12	32	32	0	40	invited to the Arab Club Champions Cup (Note: Wydad Casablanca and Raja Casablanca are also invited to the Arab Club Champions Cup.)
8	Hassania Agadir	30	10	8	12	32	40	−8	38	
9	Olympic Safi	30	10	6	14	25	32	−7	36	
10	Chabab Atlas Khénifra	30	7	13	10	25	24	+1	34	
11	Olympique Khouribga	30	10	4	16	34	40	−6	34	
12	Moghreb Tétouan	30	9	7	14	30	37	−7	34	
13	Kawkab Marrakesh	30	9	6	15	36	42	−6	33	
14	Chabab Rif Al Hoceima	30	8	7	15	26	46	−20	31	
15	JS de Kasbah Tadla (R)	30	7	7	16	25	47	−22	28	Relegation to Botola 2
16	KAC Kénitra (R)	30	5	8	17	27	50	−23	23	Relegation to Botola 2

Updated to match(es) played on 13 June 2017. Source: scoresway.com
Rules for classification: 1) points; 2) goal difference; 3) number of goals scored.
(C) Champions; (R) Relegated

=== Result table ===
Home \ Away	WAC	DHJ	RCA	RSB	IRT	FAR	FUS	HUSA	OCS	CAK	OCK	MAT	KACM	CRA	JSKT	KAC
Wydad		1–1	1–0	1–0	2–2	1–1	1–2	2–0	1–1	3–1	4–1	2–1	2–3	2–1	1–0	1–0
Difaâ El Jadidi	0–0		0–0	0–0	4–1	2–1	1–0	3–0	1–1	2–1	3–0	1–0	1–0	3–1	6–1	0–0
Raja	0–0	4–1		1–1	0–1	1–1	2–0	1–0	1–0	1–0	0–1	4–0	2–1	2–1	3–0	4–0
RS Berkane	1–1	1–1	1–1		0–0	0–2	1–0	1–0	1–0	0–1	2–0	1–0	3–0	3–0	3–0	3–0
IR Tanger	0–1	4–1	1–2	0–0		2–1	1–1	0–0	1–0	0–0	1–0	0–1	0–2	4–1	2–1	1–0
AS FAR	0–5	2–4	1–1	0–1	0–0		2–1	2–0	2–0	1–0	4–2	2–2	1–2	4–1	2–2	2–1
FUS Rabat	1–2	1–0	2–2	1–0	1–0	1–1		1–2	1–0	2–0	1–3	1–1	3–2	2–0	2–1	1–0
Hassania Agadir	1–1	0–1	2–2	1–2	0–4	1–1	2–1		3–2	1–1	1–0	2–1	1–0	3–1	2–1	3–2
OC Safi	1–2	1–2	0–0	0–1	1–2	1–1	1–0	1–0		1–0	1–0	1–1	2–1	2–1	1–0	2–1
CA Khénifra	1–1	2–2	1–1	0–0	0–0	0–0	1–3	2–1	1–0		1–0	0–0	3–0	3–0	0–0	4–0
OC Khouribga	2–3	0–0	0–0	0–1	2–1	1–2	1–0	1–1	4–0	1–0		4–1	0–4	1–1	0–1	3–1
Moghreb Tétouan	0–1	0–2	0–1	1–0	0–1	3–1	1–1	0–1	1–0	0–0	1–0		1–2	2–1	4–0	4–1
Kawkab Marrakech	2–3	0–0	0–0	1–2	2–1	1–2	1–0	1–1	0–1	2–1	1–2	2–2		1–2	1–0	1–1
CR Hoceima	1–2	0–1	1–2	1–1	1–0	0–0	0–0	1–0	0–0	1–0	1–4	2–1	1–0		2–1	0–0
JS Kasbah Tadla	0–2	0–0	0–2	2–0	1–1	2–1	1–0	2–1	1–3	1–1	1–0	0–1	3–2	1–1		0–0
KAC Kénitra	0–1	1–2	0–2	1–0	0–2	1–2	2–2	2–2	2–1	1–1	2–1	3–0	1–1	1–2	3–2	

Updated to match(es) played on 13 June 2017. Source: Botola Pro
Legend: Blue = home team win; Yellow = draw; Red = away team win.

== Season statistics ==
=== Top scorers ===
As of 13 June 2017.

Rank	Player	Club	Goals
1	(Liberia) William Jebor	Wydad Casablanca	19
2	(Morocco) Mohammed El Fakih	Kawkab Marrakech	14
2	(Morocco) Jalal Daoudi	Hassania Agadir	14
4	(Morocco) Walid Azaro	Difaâ El Jadidi	12
5	(Morocco) Amin Tighazoui	Olympique Khouribga	10
5	(Morocco) Zaid Krouch	Moghreb Tétouan	10
7	(Morocco) Issam Erraki	Raja Casablanca	9
7	(Gabon) Ngombe Mbengue	Olympique Khouribga	9
9	(Morocco) Karim El Berkaoui	Hassania Agadir	8
9	(Morocco) Mohamed Kamal	AS FAR	8
9	(Republic of the Congo) Fabrice Ondama	Wydad Casablanca	8
9	(Morocco) Zakaria Hadraf	Difaâ El Jadidi	8

=== Hat-tricks ===
Player	For	Against	Result	Date	Round
(Morocco) Zakaria Hadraf	Difaa El Jadidi	IR Tanger	4-1 (H)	4 February 2017	16
(Morocco) Mustapha El Yousfi	AS FAR	Olympique Khouribga	4-2 (H)	5 March 2017	20

(H) – Home; (A) – Away

== Annual awards ==
The Royal Moroccan Football Federation, in coordination with the LNFP ( Ligue Nationale du Football Professionnel) and the UMFP (Union Marocaine des Footballeurs Professionnels), organized on Monday 3 July 2017 the 3rd edition of the "Stars' Night" in honor of the players, coaches and referees who were distinguished during the 2016/2017 season.

Award	Winner	Club
Manager of the Season	(Morocco) Hussein Amotta	Wydad AC
Player of the Season	(Morocco) Mohamed Ounajem	Wydad AC
Promising Player of the Season	(Morocco) Ahmed Hammoudan	IR Tanger
Goalkeeper of the Season	(Morocco) Anas Zniti	Raja CA
Foreign Player of the Season	(Mali) Mohamed Konate	RS Berkane
Referee of the Season	(Morocco) Redouane Jiyed	
Club of the Season	Wydad AC	

== See also ==
- 2016 Coupe du Trône
- 2016–17 GNF 2
- 2017 CAF Champions League
- 2017 CAF Confederation Cup
- 2017 Arab Club Championship
