= 2008–09 Moroccan Throne Cup =

Tournament details
- Country: Morocco

Final positions
- Champions: FAR de Rabat (11th title)

The 2008–09 season of the Moroccan Throne Cup was the 53rd edition of the competition. It began on 22 November 2008.

The cup was won by FAR de Rabat, who beat Fath Union Sport in the final.

== 3rd round ==
| Date | Team 1 | Team 2 | Result |
|---|---|---|---|
| 10 January 2009 | ASOFP | Majd Madina Casablanca | 1 - 0 |
| 10 January 2009 | Chabab Ismailia Meknès | FCM | 1 - 3 |
| 10 January 2009 | Club des Étudiants de Tétouan | Renaissance Martil | 0 - 1 |
| 10 January 2009 | Ahram El Bidaoui | ERM | 0 - 1 |
| 10 January 2009 | CSS | Wafaa Sidi Moumen | 0 - 1 |
| 11 January 2009 | Renaissance Sportive de Berkane | Etoile Oujda | 1 - 1 (8-9 pens) |
| 11 January 2009 | CS Manar Boujdour | Renaissance Sportive Tantan | 4 - 2 |
| 11 January 2009 | Najah Meknes | CSCA | 1 - 0 |
| 11 January 2009 | Raja Agadir | AUAS | 1 - 1 (4-5 pens) |
| 11 January 2009 | Najah Souss Agadir | AS Chabab El Khayame | 0 - 1 |
| 11 January 2009 | Oued Zem | USAZ | 1 - 0 |
| 11 January 2009 | Chabab Atlas Khénifra | AAEH | 2 - 0 |
| 11 January 2009 | Chabab Ben Guérir | Taraji | 1 - 0 |
| 11 January 2009 | Union Sportive Aït Melloul | Amal Talabat Biokri | 4 - 0 |
| 11 January 2009 | Chabab Kasba Tadla | Fath Sidi Bennour | 2 - 1 |
| 11 January 2009 | Hassania Benslimane | Renaissance Tiflet | 1 - 0 |
| 11 January 2009 | Renaissance de Tarfaya | AZAQ | 0 - 0 (7-6 pens) |
| 11 January 2009 | Renaissance d'Oujda | Hilal Association Nador | 1 - 3 |
| 11 January 2009 | CJBG | Union Touarga Sport Rabat | 1 - 0 |
| 11 January 2009 | ASOFP | Najm Soualem | 0 - 0 (2-4 pens) |
| 11 January 2009 | CCA | Wydad Smara | 0 - 1 |
| 11 January 2009 | USLA | ASMJ | 1 - 0 |
| 11 January 2009 | USTA | Qods Taza | 1 - 0 |
| 11 January 2009 | ASM | Association d'Asila | 1 - 0 |
| 11 January 2009 | CSF | Chabab Larache | 1 - 0 |
| 11 January 2009 | AUIF | Intila9 Taourirte | 0 - 0 (3-4 pens) |
| 11 January 2009 | TACM | Municipalité Ouarzazate | 0 - 4 |
| 11 January 2009 | Fath Riadi Nador | USJ | 2 - 1 |

== 4th Round ==
| Date | Team 1 | Team 2 | Result |
|---|---|---|---|
| 7 February 2009 | Najah Meknes | FCM | - |
| 7 February 2009 | Najm Soualem | ASOFP | 1 - 0 |
| 7 February 2009 | Wafaa Sidi Moumen | ERM | - |
| 7 February 2009 | CJBG | Hassania Benslimane | 1 - 0 |
| 7 February 2009 | USLA | ASM | 1 - 2 |
| 8 February 2009 | Intila9 Taourirte | Fath Riadi Nador | 2 - 3 |
| 8 February 2009 | Oued Zem | Chabab Kasa Tadla | 0 - 2 |
| 8 February 2009 | Etoile Oujda | Hilal Association Nador | 0 - 3 |
| 8 February 2009 | Chabab Ben Guérir | Municipalité Sportive Ouarzazate | 2 - 1 |
| 8 February 2009 | Qods Taza | CAK | 1 - 1 (5-4 pens) |
| 8 February 2009 | Wydad Smara | CS Manar Boujdour | 2 - 0 |
| 8 February 2009 | Renaissance de Tarfaya | Union Sportive Aït Melloul | 0 - 2 |
| 8 February 2009 | AUAS | AS Chabab El Khayame | 1 - 2 |
| 8 February 2009 | CSF | Renaissance Martil | 0 - 0 (2-4 pens) |

== 5th Round ==
This round saw the entry of teams from the GNF 2. The draw was made on Wednesday 25 February 2009.

| Date | Team 1 | Team 2 | Result |
|---|---|---|---|
| 7 March 2009 | Renaissance de Settat (D2) | Chez Ali Club de Marrakech (D2) | 3 - 0 |
| 7 March 2009 | Fkih Ben Salah (D2) | Chabab Benguérir (D3) | 3 - 0 |
| 7 March 2009 | Rachad Bernoussi (D2) | Chabab Kasba Tadla (D3) | 1 - 1 (3-4 pens) |
| 7 March 2009 | Youssoufia Berrechid (D2) | Wafa Wydad (D2) | 1 - 0 |
| 7 March 2009 | Najm Soualem | TAS de Casablanca (D2) | 2 - 3 |
| 7 March 2009 | Union Sportive Aït Melloul (D3) | AS Chabab Lkhiyam (D3) | 3 - 0 |
| 7 March 2009 | AS Mansouria (D3) | Fath Union Sport (D2) | 2 - 2 (4-5 pens) |
| 7 March 2009 | Stade Marocain (D2) | FCM | 3 - 0 |
| 7 March 2009 | Wafa Sidi Moumen (D3) | Racing de Casablanca (D2) | 0 - 1 |
| 8 March 2009 | CODM de Meknès (D2) | CS Fnideq (D4) | 7 - 1 |
| 8 March 2009 | Union de Mohammédia (D2) | US Témara (D2) | 2 - 1 |
| 8 March 2009 | Wydad de Fès (D2) | Ittihad de Tanger (D2) | 1 - 0 |
| 8 March 2009 | Union de Sidi Kacem (D2) | CJBG Bouznika (D4) | 0 - 1 |
| 8 March 2009 | Qods Sportif Taza (D3) | Fath de Nador (D4) | 1 - 1 (4-3 pens) |
| 8 March 2009 | Chabab Rif Hoceima (D2) | Hilal de Nador (D3) | 0 - 0 (5-6 pens) |
| 8 March 2009 | Wydad Smara (D4) | Chabab Houara (D2) | 0 - 2 |

== Last 32 ==
This round saw the entrance of clubs from Botola. The draw was made on Thursday 26 March 2009.

| Date | Team 1 | Team 2 | Result |
|---|---|---|---|
| 4 April 2009 | Wydad AC (D1) | Youssoufia Berrechid (D2) | 4–1 |
| 4 April 2009 | Chabab Mohammédia (D1) | Qods Sportif Taza (D3) | 2–1 |
| 4 April 2009 | Hassania d'Agadir (D1) | Difaâ Hassani El Jadidi (D1) | 1–0 |
| 4 April 2009 | Chabab Kasba Tadla (D3) | Fkih Ben Salah (D2) | 1–2 |
| 4 April 2009 | CJBG Bouznika (D4) | Hilal de Nador (D3) | 1–0 |
| 4 April 2009 | JS Massira (D1) | Kawkab Marrakech (D1) | 1–0 |
| 4 April 2009 | TAS de Casablanca (D2) | Renaissance de Settat (D2) | 0–0 (4–5 pens) |
| 4 April 2009 | Racing de Casablanca (D2) | Olympique de Khouribga (D1) | 0–0 (4–5 pens) |
| 5 April 2009 | Raja de Casablanca (D1) | Union Sportive Aït Melloul (D3) | 1–2 |
| 5 April 2009 | Moghreb Tétouan (D1) | KAC Kénitra (D1) | 1–0 |
| 5 April 2009 | Fath Union Sport (D2) | AS Salé (D1) | 2–1 |
| 5 April 2009 | Mouloudia d'Oujda (D1) | Stade Marocain (D2) | 1–1 (1–4 pens) |
| 5 April 2009 | Chabab Houara (D2) | Olympic Club de Safi (D1) | 0–0 (2–4 pens) |
| 8 April 2009 | FAR de Rabat (D1) | CODM de Meknès (D2) | 1–0 |
| 8 April 2009 | Wydad de Fès (D2) | Ittihad Khemisset (D1) | 2–2 (6–7 pens) |
| 15 April 2009 | Maghreb de Fès (D1) | Union de Mohammédia (D2) | 1–1 (4–1 pens) |

== Last 16 ==
The draw took place on Tuesday 14 April 2009.

| Date | Team 1 | Team 2 | Result |
|---|---|---|---|
| 25 April 2009 | Hassania d'Agadir (D1) | Fkih Ben Salah (D2) | 0–0 (2–4 pens) |
| 25 April 2009 | Moghreb Tétouan (D1) | CJBG Bouznika (D4) | 2–0 |
| 25 April 2009 | Fath Union Sport (D2) | Union Sportive Aït Melloul (D3) | 2–1 |
| 26 April 2009 | Olympique de Khouribga (D1) | JS Massira (D1) | 0–0 (5–4 tab) |
| 26 April 2009 | Ittihad Khemisset (D1) | Renaissance de Settat (D2) | 1–0 |
| 26 April 2009 | Olympic Club de Safi (D1) | Chabab Mohammédia (D1) | 0–1 |
| 26 April 2009 | FAR de Rabat (D1) | Stade Marocain (D2) | 1–0 |
| 28 June 2009 | Wydad AC (D1) | Maghreb de Fès (D1) | 2–0 |

== Quarter-finals ==
The draw took place on Tuesday 23 June 2009.

| Date | Team 1 | Team 2 | Result |
|---|---|---|---|
| 30 June 2009 | Moghreb Tétouan (D1) | Fath Union Sport (D2) | 2–2 (0–3 pens) |
| 30 June 2009 | Chabab Mohammédia (D1) | Olympique de Khouribga (D1) | 1–1 (4–2 pens) |
| 1 July 2009 | Ittihad Khemisset (D1) | Fkih Ben Salah (D2) | 2–0 |
| 1 July 2009 | FAR de Rabat (D1) | Wydad AC (D1) | 0–0 (4–2 pens) |

== Semi-finals ==
The draw took place on Tuesday 23 June 2009.

| Date | Team 1 | Team 2 | Result |
|---|---|---|---|
| 5 July 2009 | Fath Union Sport (D2) | Chabab Mohammédia (D1) | 2–0 |
| 5 July 2009 | Ittihad Khemisset (D1) | FAR de Rabat (D1) | 0–0 (4–5 pens) |

== Final ==
Teams
FAR de Rabat - Fath Union Sport
Score
1–1 (5–4 pens)
Date
18 November 2009
Stadium
17h00 - Prince Moulay Abdellah Stadium, Rabat
Referee
Bouchaïb Lahrach
Goals
55' Daniel Monchare (FUS), 88' Jawad Ouaddouch (AS.FAR)
FAR de Rabat

Fath Union Sport

Yellow cards
Fath Union Sport :

FAR de Rabat :

== See also ==
- 2008–09 Botola
