= 2011 Moroccan Throne Cup =

Tournament details
- Country: Morocco
- Dates: July 2011 – November 2011

Final positions
- Champions: Maghreb de Fès
- Runners-up: CODM de Meknès

The 2011 season of the Moroccan Throne Cup was the 55th edition of the competition.

== 5th Round ==
The fifth round is the last preliminary round, with 32 teams from the 3rd and 2nd divisions of the Moroccan football championship:

Team 1	Team 2	Result
Racing Casablanca	US Mohammedia	1–2
CODM Meknes	Raja de Hoceima	7–0
Rachad Bernoussi	Club Salmi	2–1
Stade Marocain	Kifah sportif Sidi Yahya	0–1
Ittihad Casablanca	Raja de Beni Mellal	2–1
Chabab Darouich	Ittihad Khemisset	2–1
Union Azilal	Youssoufia Berrechid	1–1 (4–3 pens)
Municipalité Ouarzazate	Fath Sidi Bennour	1–1 (15–14 pens)
Wydad Qalaat Sragna	Ittihad Fkih Ben Salah	1–0
Union de Touarga Rabat	Club sportif Toulal	2–2 (4–5 pens)
Olympic Dchira	Chabab Houara	1–3
US Temara	Club Alqasri	2–2 (4–2 tab)
Union Ait Melloul	Mouloudia Dakhla	3–1
Ittihad Tanger	AS Salé	2–3
Hilal de Nador	Mouloudia Oujda	1–0
Chabab Mohammedia	Renaissance Berkane	3–0

== Last 32 ==
Team 1	Team 2	Result
AS FAR (football)	FUS Rabat	0–1
Wydad Athletic Club	Olympique Club de Khouribga	4–3 (extra-time)
Difaâ Hassani El Jadidi	Union Ait Melloul	2–2 (5–3 pens)
Maghreb de Fès	Union Azilal	3–0
Raja de Casablanca	Olympic Club de Safi	2–3
Union de Mohammédia	Hilal de Nador	2–1
Ittihad de Casablanca	CODM de Meknès	0–1
Moghreb Tétouan	Association sportive de Salé	0–1
Chabab Rif Hoceima	Wydad de Fès	1–0
Chabab Houara	KAC Kénitra	0–1
JS Massira	Wydad Kelâat Es-Sraghna	6–0
Hassania d'Agadir	US Témara	1–0
Chabab Mohammédia	Kifah sportif Sidi Yahya	4–1
Rachad Bernoussi	JS de Kasbah Tadla	2–2 (2–3 pens)
Club sportif Toulal	Chabab Driouéch	2–0 (extra-time)
Fath Sidi Bennour	Kawkab Marrakech	0–3

== Final phases ==
=== Last 16 ===
Team 1	Team 2	Result
KAC Kénitra	FUS Rabat	0–2
JS Massira	Wydad Athletic Club	1–4
Difaâ Hassani El Jadidi	Club sportif Toulal	2–0 (extra-time)
Kawkab Marrakech	Maghreb de Fès	0–1 (extra-time)
CODM de Meknès	Olympic Club de Safi	0–0 (4–3 pens)
Association sportive de Salé	Union de Mohammédia	1–2
Chabab Mohammédia	Chabab Rif Hoceima	0–1
Hassania d'Agadir	JS de Kasbah Tadla	1–0

=== Quarter-finals ===
Team 1	Team 2	Result
CODM de Meknès	Union de Mohammédia	2–1
Difaâ Hassani El Jadidi	Chabab Rif Hoceima	2–1
Hassania d'Agadir	Maghreb de Fès	0–1
FUS Rabat	Wydad Athletic Club	1–1 (4–5 pens)

=== Semi-finals ===
Team 1	Team 2	Result
CODM de Meknès	Difaâ Hassani El Jadidi	1–0
Maghreb de Fès	Wydad Athletic Club	1–1 (3–2 pens)

=== Final ===
17 December 2011
16h30 GMT

Maghreb de Fès	1–0	CODM de Meknès
J.L Escher 73'

Prince Moulay Abdellah Stadium, Rabat
Referee: Abdallah El-Achiri

== Winner ==
Winner Moroccan Throne Cup 2011
Maghreb de Fès
3rd title

== Prize Fund ==
- Total fund: 3.5 million MAD,
- Winner: 1.5 million MAD,
- Finalist (2nd place) : 1 million MAD,
- Semi-finalists (3rd and 4th places): 0.5 Million MAD each.

== See also ==
- 2009–10 Botola
