= Football in Morocco =

- Country: Morocco
- Governing body: Royal Moroccan Football Federation
- National teams: Men's national football team, Women's national football team

National competitions
- Africa Cup of Nations; African Nations Championship; FIFA Arab Cup; FIFA World Cup

Club competitions
- League; Botola Pro; Botola Pro 2 Cups; Moroccan Throne Cup

International competitions
- CAF Champions League; CAF Confederation Cup; CAF Super Cup; FIFA Club World Cup

Football is the most popular sport in Morocco, with an estimated 55 percent of the population declaring an active interest in the sport. The sport was introduced to the region in the late nineteenth century by French expatriates, highlighted by the founding of Association Sportive des Postes, Télégraphes et Téléphones (ASPTT) in Casablanca in 1892, two decades prior to the formal establishment of the French protectorate in 1912. The Royal Moroccan Football Federation (Arabic: الجامعة الملكية المغربية لكرة القدم; Tifanigh: ⵜⴰⵙⴷⴰⵡⵉⵜ ⵜⴰⴳⵍⴷⴰⵏⵜ ⵜⴰⵎⵖⵔⵉⴱⵉⵜ ⵏ ⵜⵡⵊⵊⴰ ⵏ ⵓⴹⴰⵕ, or FRMF) is the sport's national governing body, assuming domestic control following independence in 1956. The country features a structured tier system, spearheaded by the professional top-flight division, the Botola Pro 1, followed by Botola Pro 2. The winner of the Botola Pro 1 is crowned the Moroccan football champion.

Football in Morocco has witnessed significant development in recent years, with increased international fame. Morocco hosted the 2013 FIFA Club World Cup, in which Moroccan team Raja reached the final, finishing runners-up to German Bundesliga heavyweights Bayern Munich. The most popular clubs in the country are Wydad Casablanca, Raja Casablanca and AS FAR.

The Morocco national football team has won the Africa Cup of Nations and Arab Cup twice each, and African Nations Championship three times. The Atlas Lions are Africa's greatest ever FIFA World Cup national team, having participated in the competition six times, making history as the first and only African side to reach the semi-finals at the 2022 World Cup, as well as reach back-to-back quarter-finals at the 2026 World Cup. The Atlas Lions hold records for both the longest winning streak by a national team at 19, and undefeated matches at 43 respectively.

== History ==
Football was introduced and developed in Morocco during the early-to-mid twentieth century, becoming a large part of Moroccan identity and culture. Since its introduction football has been used as a voice for people and played an important role in national movements. Teams such as Wydad AC and Raja Club Athletic became important clubs for Moroccan liberation movements as they provided legal places for Moroccans to gather and express themselves and their dissatisfaction with French rule. Moroccan clubs continue to be a voice for the public with many ultras groups using chants as a tool to protest against the government. Moroccan football has since grown to include a league with a tier system and a club tournament known as the Throne Cup.

== National competitions ==
=== Botola Pro ===
Nationally, professional football is divided into 2 leagues: the top-tier and the second-tier. Founded in 1915 the Botola Pro is the top-tier division in Morocco and was organized by the Moroccan Football League Association until 1956. In 1956 Morocco gained independence and the league fell under jurisdiction of the Royal Moroccan Football Federation (FRMF). The competition consists of 16 teams with the bottom two teams being relegated to the Botola Pro 2 and the top two teams qualifying for the CAF Champions League. The competition runs from September to May with each team playing a total of 30 matches. The Botola Pro 2 follows the same format with 16 teams with the top two teams being promoted and the bottom two teams being relegated to the third division.

In the top division 20 of 31 clubs have managed to win the league: Wydad AC (22), USM Casablanca (15), AS FAR (13), Raja CA (13), MAS Fez (4), Kenitra AC (4), RAC Casablanca (3), KAC Marrakech (2), HUS Agadir (2), MA Tétouan (2), FUS Rabat (1), OC Khouribga (1), RS Settat (1), IR Tanger (1), CO Casablanca (1), MC Oujda (1), COD Meknès (1), SCC Mohammédia (1), Raja Beni Mellal (1), and EJS Casablanca (1), RS Berkane (1)

=== Throne Cup ===
The Throne Cup was founded in 1957 one year after Moroccos independence and replaced the old Moroccan cup that was played under French colonialism. The tournament features teams from both the first and second division as well as clubs from the first amateur division. The tournament is formatted in a knock out format starting with the round of 32 with the winners advancing to the next round.

19 clubs have won the cup: AS FAR (12), Wydad AC (9), Raja CA (8), FUS Rabat (6), KAC Marrakesh (6), MAS Fez (4), MC Oujda (4), RS Berkane (3), CO Casablanca (3), OC Khouribga (2), SCC Mohammédia (2), Difaa El Jadida (1), Kenitra AC (1), RS Settat (1), COD Meknès (1), RAC Casablanca (1), TAS Casablanca (1), OC Safi (1) and Majd Casablanca (1).

== International competitions ==
=== Morocco men's national football team ===
The Morocco national football team, nicknamed Lions de l'Atlas (Atlas Lions), is the national team of Morocco and is controlled by the Royal Moroccan Football Federation. They were the first African team to qualify directly for the World Cup finals, doing so in 1970. They were also the first African team to win a group at the World Cup, finishing ahead of Portugal, Poland, and England in 1986. Morocco fell to eventual runner-up West Germany 1-0 in the second round. In 2022 Morocco finished top of Group F, ahead of Croatia, Belgium and Canada. In the Round of 16, they beat Spain in a penalty shootout, becoming the first Arab country to reach the quarter-finals. The Atlas Lions then defeated Portugal by one goal, before bowing out to France in a close-fought semi-final .

Morocco won the Africa Cup of Nations twice, in 1976 and 2025. They also won the African Nations Championship in 2018, 2020 and 2024 making them the nation with the most number of wins. Morocco’s U-20 national team accomplished a historic victory in 2025 by winning the U-20 World Cup in Chile, winning against Argentina 2-0 in the final. Moroccan clubs have also hosted and competed in multiple FIFA Club World Cups, including the tournaments held in 2013, 2014, and 2022.. Morocco will become the second African nation to host the FIFA World Cup when it will host the 24th FIFA World Cup in June and July 2030 along with Portugal and Spain.

=== Morocco women's national football team ===
The Morocco women's national football team represents Morocco in international women's football and is controlled by the Royal Moroccan Football Federation. The team played its first international match in 1998, as part of the 3rd African Women's Championship. In the 14th edition of the Women's Africa Cup of Nations, the Morocco women's team managed to secure a silver medal after a 2-1 loss against South Africa in the 2022 Women's Africa Cup of Nations. They also qualified for the 2023 FIFA Women's World Cup and will be the first Arab country ever to participate in the Women's World Cup. In their first participation in the FIFA Women's World Cup, They placed 2nd after losing 6-0 to Germany, winning 1-0 against South Korea and winning 1-0 against Colombia. This qualified them to the Knock-out stages.In preparation for the 2024 Women's Africa Cup of Nations the team spent a month at the Mohamed VI Football Complex to train, they are led by Ghizlane Chebbak.

While women's football has been present in Morocco, it wasn't until recent years it has gained support among citizens. Some of this new support originated in 2016 when a plan was made in order to support women's football by increasing salaries and accessibility to training for coaching. Morocco's Football Federation also made a new women's professional league.

=== Clubs ===
Moroccan clubs are the second most decorated in African competitions with 25 titles: 1 African Cup Winners' Cup, 2 CAF Cup, 8 CAF Confederation Cup, 7 CAF Champions League, 5 CAF Super Cup and 2 Afro-Asian Club Championship.

== Largest Moroccan football stadiums ==
Image	Stadium	Capacity	Opened	City	Club
	Stade Mohamed V	45,000	1955	Casablanca	Moroccan team Raja Casablanca; Wydad Casablanca
	Ibn Batouta Stadium	65,000	2011	Tangier	IR Tanger
	Prince Moulay Abdellah Stadium	53,000	1983	Rabat	Moroccan team FAR Rabat
	Adrar Stadium	45,480	2013	Agadir	Hassania Agadir
	Marrakesh Stadium	45,240	2011	Marrakesh	KAC Marrakech
	Fez Stadium	45,000	2007	Fez	Maghreb de Fès; Wydad de Fès

== Support ==
Twitter research from 2015 found that the most popular English Premier League club in Morocco was by far Arsenal, with 55% of Moroccan Premier League fans following the club, followed by Chelsea (14%) and Manchester City (10%).

== Attendances ==
The average attendance per top-flight football league season and the club with the highest average attendance:

Season	League average	Best club	Best club average
2024-25	7,093	Wydad	23,880
2019-20	9,268	Wydad	25,305
2018-19	9,761	IR Tanger	17,877
2017-18	9,292	IR Tanger	23,750
2015-16	9,709	IR Tanger	23,572
2012-13	10,103	Raja	33,167

Sources: League pages on Wikipedia

== See also ==
- List of football stadiums in Morocco
