= 2018 Moroccan Throne Cup =

Coupe du Trône
Tournament details
- Country: Morocco

Final positions
- Champions: Nahdat Berkane (1st title)
- Runners-up: Wydad de Fès

The 2018 Moroccan Throne Cup was the 62nd staging of the Moroccan Throne Cup, the knockout football tournament in Morocco. The winners were assured a place for the 2018–19 CAF Confederation Cup.

The 2018 Moroccan Throne Cup Final played at the Prince Moulay Abdellah Stadium in Rabat, on 18 November 2018. Nahdat Berkane winning their 1st title.

== Fourth round ==
The fourth round was played on 12–16 May 2018.

Team 1	Score	Team 2
Wydad de Fès	2–1	Maghreb de Fes
Renaissance Taourirt	0–2	AS Salé
US Musulmane d'Oujda	0–0 (4–5 p)	Union Sidi Kacem
Chabab Mrirt	0–1	Mouloudia Missour
KAC Kénitra	2–0	Chabab Larache
Rajaa Sportif d'Arfoud	1–2	Stade Marocain
Union de Touarga	2–1	SCC Mohammédia
Ittihad Khemisset	2–1	Mouloudia Oujda
Club Rachad Bernoussi	2–1	Chabab Ben Guerir
Youssoufia Berrechid	0–2	Renaissance Ezzmamra
CSM Ouarzazate	1–4	Wydad Témara
Olympique Dcheira	2–1	JS Massira
US Amal Tiznit	2–1	Olympique Youssoufia
Wydad Serghini	0–1	Raja Beni Mellal
Mouloudia Assa	0–0 (3–4 p)	Nasma Sportif Settat
JS de Kasbah Tadla	4–5	Najah Souss

== Final phase ==
=== Qualified teams ===
The following teams competed in the 2018 Coupe du Trône.

16 teams of 2017–18 Botola

- AS FAR
- Chabab Atlas Khénifra
- Chabab Rif Hoceima
- Difaâ El Jadidi
- FUS Rabat
- Hassania Agadir
- IR Tanger
- Kawkab Marrakech
- Moghreb Tétouan
- Olympic Safi
- Olympique Khouribga
- Racing de Casablanca
- Raja Casablanca
- Rapide Oued Zem
- RSB Berkane
- Wydad Casablanca

9 teams of 2017–18 Botola 2

- AS Salé
- Club Rachad Bernoussi
- Ittihad Khemisset
- KAC Kénitra
- Olympique Dcheira
- Raja Beni Mellal
- Union Sidi Kacem
- Wydad de Fès
- Wydad Témara

2 teams of 2017–18 Division Nationale

- Stade Marocain
- Renaissance Ezzmamra

4 teams of 2017–18 Championnat du Maroc Amateurs I

- Mouloudia Missour
- Najah Souss
- Nasma Sportif Settat
- Union de Touarga

1 team of 2017–18 Championnat du Maroc Amateurs II

- US Amal Tiznit

=== Bracket ===
Round of 32
Olympique Khouribga	2
Najah Souss	0
RSB Berkane	2
Union de Touarga	1
AS Salé	1
FUS Rabat	2
Difaâ El Jadidi	4
Club Rachad Bernoussi	0
Kawkab Marrakech	1
Wydad Casablanca	2
IR Tanger	1
Moghreb Tétouan	0
Raja Beni Mellal	0
Olympic Safi	1
Renaissance Ezzmamra	0
Hassania Agadir	1
Mouloudia Missour	1
Stade Marocain	2
Ittihad Khemisset	1
AS FAR	0
Wydad de Fès	3
Union Sidi Kacem	2
Racing de Casablanca	0
O Dcheira (a.e.t.)	1
Nasma Sportif Settat	0
Rapide Oued Zem	1
US Amal Tiznit	1
Wydad Témara	2
Chabab Rif Hoceima	0
KAC Kénitra	4
Chabab Atlas Khénifra	0
Raja Casablanca	1

Round of 16
Olympique Khouribga	0
RSB Berkane	1
FUS Rabat	0 (3)
Difaâ El Jadidi (p)	0 (4)
Wydad Casablanca	2
IR Tanger	0
Olympic Safi (p)	0 (4)
Hassania Agadir	0 (2)
Stade Marocain	1
Ittihad Khemisset	0
Wydad de Fès (p)	1 (5)
Olympique Dcheira	1 (4)
Rapide Oued Zem	5
Wydad Témara	0
KAC Kénitra	1
Raja Casablanca	3

Quarter-finals
RSB Berkane	2
Difaâ El Jadidi	0
Wydad Casablanca	2
Olympic Safi	1
Stade Marocain	2
Wydad de Fès	3
Rapide Oued Zem	0
Raja Casablanca	1

Semi-finals
RSB Berkane (p)	1 (6)
Wydad Casablanca	1 (5)
Wydad de Fès (p)	1 (4)
Raja Casablanca	1 (3)

Final
RSB Berkane	2 (3)
Wydad de Fès	2 (2)

== Round of 32 ==
- 1/16th finals of the Coupe du Trône : 1–2 September 2018

Draw of the Coupe du Trône 2017 - 2018 season

Team 1	Score	Team 2
Wydad de Fès	3 - 2	Union Sidi Kacem
Ittihad Khemisset	1 - 0	AS FAR
Mouloudia Missour	1 - 2	Stade Marocain
RSB Berkane	2 - 1	Union de Touarga
AS Salé	1 - 2	FUS Rabat
IR Tanger	1 - 0	Moghreb Tétouan
Chabab Atlas Khénifra	0 - 1	Raja Casablanca
Chabab Rif Hoceima	0 - 4	KAC Kénitra
US Amal Tiznit	1 - 2	Wydad Témara
Kawkab Marrakech	1 - 2	Wydad Casablanca
Racing de Casablanca	0 - 1 (a.e.t.)	Olympique Dcheira
Difaâ El Jadidi	4 - 0	Rachad Bernoussi
Renaissance Ezzmamra	0 - 1	Hassania Agadir
Olympique Khouribga	2 - 0	Najah Souss
Nasma Sportif Settat	0 - 1	Rapide Oued Zem
Raja Beni Mellal	0 - 1	Olympic Safi

== Round of 16 ==
Qualified teams
The following teams competed in the 2018 Coupe du Trône, Round of 16:
10 teams of 2017–18 Botola

- Difaâ El Jadidi
- FUS Rabat
- Hassania Agadir
- IR Tanger
- Wydad Casablanca
- Olympic Safi
- Olympique Khouribga
- Raja Casablanca
- Rapide Oued Zem
- RSB Berkane

5 teams of 2017–18 Botola 2

- Ittihad Khemisset
- KAC Kénitra
- Olympique Dcheira
- Wydad de Fès
- Wydad Témara

1 teams of 2017–18 Division Nationale

- Stade Marocain

Matches

- 1/8th finals of the Coupe du Trône : 11–13; 26 September and 3 October 2018

Team 1	Score	Team 2
Olympique Khouribga	0 - 1	RSB Berkane
FUS Rabat	0 - 0 (3–4 p)	Difaâ El Jadidi
Wydad Casablanca	2 - 0	IR Tanger
Olympic Safi	(4–2 p) 0 - 0	Hassania Agadir
Stade Marocain	1 - 0	Ittihad Khemisset
Wydad de Fès	(5–4 p) 1 - 1	Olympique Dcheira
Rapide Oued Zem	5 - 0	Wydad Témara
KAC Kénitra	1 - 3	Raja Casablanca

== Quarter-finals ==
- 1/4th finals of the Coupe du Trône : 6–7 October 2018

Team 1	Score	Team 2
RSB Berkane	2 – 0	Difaâ El Jadidi
Wydad Casablanca	2 – 1	Olympic Safi
Stade Marocain	2 – 3	Wydad de Fès
Rapide Oued Zem	0 – 1	Raja Casablanca

== Semi-finals ==
- 1/2th finals of the Coupe du Trône: 2–3 November 2018

Team 1	Score	Team 2
RSB Berkane	(6–5 p) 1–1	Wydad Casablanca
Wydad de Fès	(4–3 p) 1–1	Raja Casablanca

== Final ==
18 November 2018
15:00 UTC+1

RS Berkane	2–2 (a.e.t.)	WA Fès
Ferhane 57'; Naji 90'		Mamadou 59'; Jerrari 77'
Penalties
Nemsaoui (penalty missed); Laachir (penalty scored); Mokadem (penalty scored); El Helali (penalty missed); Aziz (penalty scored)	3–2	(penalty missed) Briguel; (penalty scored) Afsal; (penalty missed) Ngoundo; (penalty missed) Diane; (penalty scored) Benjelloun

Prince Moulay Abdellah Stadium, Rabat
Referee: Samir Geuzzaz
