= List of football stadiums in Morocco =

The following is a list of football stadiums in Morocco, ordered by capacity.

== Current stadiums ==
#	Image	Stadium	Capacity	City	Home team	Opened
1		Ibn Batouta Stadium	75,600	Tangier	IR Tanger	2011
2		Prince Moulay Abdellah Stadium	68,700	Rabat	AS FAR, Morocco national football team	2025
3		Adrar Stadium	45,480	Agadir	HUS Agadir	2013
4		Marrakesh Stadium	45,240	Marrakesh	KAC Marrakech	2011
5		Stade Mohammed V	45,000	Casablanca	Wydad AC; Raja CA	1955
6		Fez Stadium	45,000	Fez	MAS Fes	2007
7		Honor Stadium	35,000	Oujda	MC Oujda	1977
8		Kenitra Municipal Stadium	28,000	Kenitra	KAC Kenitra	1941
9		Moulay Hassan Stadium	22,000	Rabat	FUS Rabat	2025
10		Rabat Olympic Stadium	21,000	Rabat	US Yacoub El Mansour	2025
11		Larbi Benbarek Stadium	20,000	Casablanca	USM Casablanca	1920
12		Larbi Zaouli Stadium	18,600	Casablanca	TAS Casablanca	1990
13		Al Medina Stadium	18,000	Rabat	UTS Rabat	2025
14		Grand Stade d'Al Hoceima	15,000	Al Hoceima		2023
15		Meknes Honor Stadium	12,000	Meknes	COD Meknès	1962
16		Mimoun Al Arsi Stadium	12,000	Al Hoceima	CR Al-Hoceima	1950
17		Stade d'honneur	12,000	Beni Mellal	Raja Beni Mellal	
18		Stade Colonel Abdelkader Allam	12,000	Sidi Kacem	US Sidi Kacem	
19		Stade Municipal	10,300	Fquih Ben Salah	IR Fkih Ben Salah	
20		Ben M'Hamed El Abdi Stadium	10,000	El-Jadida	DH Jadida	
21		El Bachir Stadium	10,000	Mohammedia	SCC Mohammédia	1954
22		Al Inbiâate Stadium	10,000	Agadir		
23		Stade Hassan II	10,000	Fez	Wydad Fez	
24		El Harti Stadium	10,000	Marrakesh	KAC Marrakech	1930
25		Père Jégo Stadium	10,000	Casablanca	RAC Casablanca	
26		Stade d'honneur de Settat	10,000	Settat	RS Settat	
27		Stade Tessema	10,000	Casablanca		
28		Berkane Municipal Stadium	10,000	Berkane	RS Berkane	2014
29		Stade municipal d'Oujda	10,000	Oujda	USM Oujda	
30		Sidi Bernoussi Stadium	10,000	Casablanca	Rachad Bernoussi	
31		Stade Municipal de Khenifra	10,000	Khenifra	Chabab Atlas Khenifra	
32		Stade d'honneur	10,000	Settat		
33		El Massira Stadium	8,000	Safi	OC Safi	1936
34		Saniat Rmel Stadium	7,000	Tétouan	MA Tetouan	1913
35		Stade Ahmed Achhoud	5,000	Rabat	Stade Marocain	
36		Boubker Ammar Stadium	5,000	Salé	AS Salé	2007
37		Phosphate Stadium	5,000	Khouribga	OC Khouribga	
38		Ahmed Choukri Stadium	5,000	Zemamra	RCA Zemamra	
39		Berrechid Municipal Stadium	5,000	Berrechid	CAY Berrechid	2018
40		Stade Municipal d'Ait Melloul	5,000	Ait Melloul	Union Ait Melloul	
41		18 November Stadium	5,000	Khemisset	IZ Khemisset	

== Under construction ==
Stadium	Capacity	City	Status	Opening
Hassan II Stadium	115,000	Casablanca	Under Construction	2028

== Future renovations ==
Stadium	Capacity	City	Home team	Status	Opening	Note
Fez Stadium	55,000	Fez		Planned	2030	The President of the Royal Moroccan Football Federation Faouzi Lekjaa confirmed that all selected stadiums by Morocco for the 2030 FIFA World Cup will have no less than 55,000 seats capacity.
Adrar Stadium	55,000	Agadir		Planned	2030	The President of the Royal Moroccan Football Federation Faouzi Lekjaa confirmed that all selected stadiums by Morocco for the 2030 FIFA World Cup will have no less than 55,000 seats capacity.
Marrakesh Stadium	55,000	Marrakesh		Planned	2030	The President of the Royal Moroccan Football Federation Faouzi Lekjaa confirmed that all selected stadiums by Morocco for the 2030 FIFA World Cup will have no less than 55,000 seats capacity.

== Former stadiums ==
Stadium	Capacity	City	Home team	Opened	Status
Prince Moulay Abdellah Stadium	53,000	Rabat	AS FAR	1983	Demolished and Completely rebuilding
Stade de Marchan	20,000	Tangier	IR Tanger	1939	Demolished
FUS Stadium	15,000	Rabat	FUS Rabat	1923	Demolished
Tessema Stadium	10,000	Casablanca	CWW Casablanca		Demolished
Moulay Al Hassan Stadium	10,000	Rabat	FUS Rabat		Demolished
Green March Stadium	4,000	Salé	AS Salé		Demolished in 2006

== List of football stadiums in Moroccan-occupied Western Sahara ==
The following is a list of football stadiums in Western Sahara, ordered by capacity. All of these stadiums are within the Moroccan-occupied area of the territory.

=== Currently in use ===
Rank	Image	Stadium	Capacity	Opened	City	Tenants
1		Sheikh Mohamed Laghdaf Stadium	30,000	1984	El Aaiún	JS Massira; Western Sahara team (formerly)
2		Moulay Rachid Stadium	5,000	1991	El-Aaiún	JS Massira
3		Dakhla Municipal Stadium	1,000		Dakhla (Villa Cisneros)	Mouloudia Dakhla
4		Boujdour Stadium			Boujdour	AJS Boujdour; Western Sahara team (formerly)

=== Under construction ===
Image	Stadium	Capacity	City	Status	Opening
	Dakhla Stadium	15,000	Dakhla	Under Construction	Unknown

== See also ==
- List of African stadiums by capacity
- List of stadiums by capacity
- Lists of stadiums
- Football in Morocco
