= 2006–07 GNF 2 =

The 2006–07 season of the GNF 2 second division of Moroccan football.

== Teams ==
- Chabab Mohammédia
- Chabab Houara
- KAC Kenitra
- FUS de Rabat
- Union de Touarga
- Racing Casablanca
- Stade Marocain
- Tihad Témara
- Renaissance Berkane
- Renaissance de Settat
- Hilal de Nador
- Wafa Wydad
- Union Sidi Kacem
- Rachad Bernoussi
- Union Mohammédia
- Youssoufia Berrechid

== Final league table ==
| Pos | Team | Pld | W | D | L | GF | GA | GD | Pts | Promotion or relegation |
|---|---|---|---|---|---|---|---|---|---|---|
| 1 | FUS de Rabat (C) | 30 | 14 | 13 | 3 | 31 | 13 | +18 | 55 | Promoted to GNF 1 |
| 2 | KAC Kenitra | 30 | 14 | 11 | 5 | 38 | 22 | +16 | 53 | Promoted to GNF 1 |
| 3 | Chabab Houara | 30 | 12 | 11 | 7 | 26 | 18 | +8 | 47 | |
| 4 | Union de Touarga | 30 | 12 | 7 | 11 | 26 | 20 | +6 | 43 | |
| 5 | Rachad Bernoussi | 30 | 8 | 17 | 5 | 22 | 14 | +8 | 41 | |
| 6 | Union de Sidi Kacem | 30 | 10 | 10 | 10 | 25 | 26 | −1 | 40 | |
| 7 | Renaissance de Settat | 30 | 9 | 12 | 9 | 27 | 30 | −3 | 39 | |
| 8 | SCCM de Mohammédia | 30 | 9 | 11 | 10 | 20 | 25 | −5 | 38 | |
| 9 | Tihad Témara | 30 | 8 | 13 | 9 | 30 | 27 | +3 | 37 | |
| 10 | Racing de Casablanca | 30 | 8 | 13 | 9 | 27 | 27 | 0 | 37 | |
| 11 | Union de Mohammédia | 30 | 9 | 10 | 11 | 20 | 24 | −4 | 37 | |
| 12 | Youssoufia Berrechid | 30 | 8 | 11 | 11 | 18 | 23 | −5 | 35 | |
| 13 | Wafa Wydad | 30 | 9 | 6 | 15 | 26 | 37 | −11 | 33 | |
| 14 | Hilal de Nador | 30 | 7 | 12 | 11 | 19 | 29 | −10 | 33 | |
| 15 | Stade Marocain | 30 | 5 | 16 | 9 | 18 | 27 | −9 | 31 | Relegated to GNFA 1 |
| 16 | Renaissance de Berkane | 30 | 5 | 13 | 12 | 21 | 32 | −11 | 28 | Relegated to GNFA 1 |

(C) Champions

Moroccan GNF 2 2006-07 winners
FUS de Rabat
3rd title
