= 2005–06 GNF 2 =

The 2005–06 season of the GNF 2 second division of Moroccan football.

== Teams ==
- Maghreb Fez
- Kawkab Marrakech
- KAC Kenitra
- FUS de Rabat
- Fath de Nador
- Racing Casablanca
- Stade Marocain
- Najm de Marrakech
- Renaissance Berkane
- Renaissance de Settat
- Hilal de Nador
- Wafa Wydad
- Union Sidi Kacem
- Rachad Bernoussi
- Union Mohammédia
- Youssoufia Berrechid

== Final league table ==
Pos	Team	Pld	W	D	L	GF	GA	GD	Pts	Promotion or relegation
1	Maghreb Fez (C)	30	16	12	2	33	14	+19	60	Promoted to GNF 1
2	Kawkab Marrakech	30	16	10	4	32	18	+14	58	Promoted to GNF 1
3	Youssoufia Berrechid	30	13	8	9	32	28	+4	47	
4	Racing de Casablanca	30	11	12	7	26	23	+3	45	
5	Renaissance de Berkane	30	13	5	12	32	36	−4	44	
6	Union de Mohammédia	30	9	13	8	25	23	+2	40	
7	Union de Sidi Kacem	30	10	10	10	21	23	−2	40	
8	KAC Kenitra	30	8	15	7	27	20	+7	39	
9	Rachad Bernoussi	30	9	10	11	28	31	−3	37	
10	Stade Marocain	30	8	11	11	20	26	−6	35	
11	Hilal de Nador	30	8	11	11	20	23	−3	35	
12	FUS de Rabat	30	7	11	12	27	35	−8	32	
13	Wafa Wydad	30	5	17	8	14	18	−4	32	
14	Renaissance de Settat	30	8	9	13	26	31	−5	31 (Note: 2 points deducted?)	
15	Najm de Marrakech	30	7	9	14	24	27	−3	30	Relegated to GNFA 1
16	Fath de Nador	30	5	11	14	17	29	−12	26	Relegated to GNFA 1

(C) Champions
Notes:

Moroccan GNF 2 2005-06 winners
