= Houssam Amaanan =

Moroccan footballer

Personal information
- Date of birth: 12 May 1994 (age 32)
- Place of birth: Oujda, Morocco
- Height: 1.72 m (5 ft 8 in)
- Position: Midfielder

Team information
- Current team: JS Soualem

Youth career
- Hassania Lazari Oujda

Senior career*
Years	Team	Apps	(Gls)
2013–2015	MC Oujda		
2015–2017	MAS Fez	34	(0)
2017	Wydad Casablanca	1	(0)
2017–2018	RS Berkane	16	(1)
2019	CR Al Hoceima	12	(0)
2019–2020	DHJ	23	(2)
2020–2022	Olympique Club de Khouribga		
2022–2023	Ohod	14	(0)
2023–	JS Soualem	0	(0)

International career
2016	Morocco local	3	(0)
- * Club domestic league appearances and goals as of 23:30, 11 November 2019 (UTC)

Houssam Amaanan (Arabic: حسام أمعنان; born 12 May 1994 in Oujda) is a Moroccan footballer who plays as a midfielder for JS Soualem.

== Career ==
He showed himself after helping MAS Fes win the 2016 Moroccan Throne Cup season against classic teams in Botola pro.Indded, MAS Fes was in the Botola 2 the 2016 season.

He signed for Wydad Casablanca winter of 2017 for a 3 and half years contract.

On 17 July 2022, Amaanan joined Saudi Arabian club Ohod.

On 1 February 2023, Amaanan joined JS Soualem.

== Honours ==
MAS Fes

- 2016 Moroccan Throne Cup: 2016
