= 2016 Moroccan Throne Cup =

Moroccan Throne Cup
Tournament details
- Country: Morocco

Final positions
- Champions: MAS Fez (4th title)
- Runners-up: Olympic Safi

The 2016 Moroccan Throne Cup was the 60th staging of the Moroccan Throne Cup. The winners were assured a place for the 2017 CAF Confederation Cup preliminary round.

Olympique Khouribga will enter as the defending champions after winning the 2015 edition.

The 2016 Moroccan Throne Cup Final was played at the Stade Sheikh Mohamed Laghdaf in Laayoune, on 18 November 2016. MAS Fez won their 4th title.

== Final phase ==
=== Qualified teams ===
The following teams competed in the 2016 Moroccan Throne Cup.

16 teams of 2015–16 Botola

- Chabab Rif Hoceima
- Difaâ El Jadidi
- FAR Rabat
- FUS Rabat
- Hassania Agadir
- IR Tanger
- KAC Kénitra
- Kawkab Marrakech
- Maghreb Fès
- MC Oujda
- Moghreb Tétouan
- Olympic Safi
- Olympique Khouribga
- Raja Casablanca
- RSB Berkane
- Wydad Casablanca

9 teams of 2015–16 GNF 2

- Ittihad Khemisset
- JS Massira
- Olympique Marrakech
- Rachad Bernoussi
- Racing de Casablanca
- Raja Beni Mellal
- US Témara
- Wydad Témara
- Youssoufia Berrechid

6 teams of 2015–16 GNFA 1

- Amal Souk Sebt
- Fath Wislan Meknes
- Hassania Lazari Oujda
- Renaissance Martil
- Union Sidi Kacem
- Union Sportif Amal Tiznit

1 teams of 2015–16 GNFA 2

- Club Rajaa Sportive Jadida

=== Bracket ===
Round of 32
O Marrakech | 1 | 1 | 2
Olympic Safi | 4 | 7 | 11
Wydad Témara | 2 | 2 | 4
Union Sidi Kacem | 2 | 3 | 5
Racing Casablanca | 1 | 1 | 2
Fath Union Sport | 2 | 4 | 6
Fath Wislan | 3 | 0 | 3
KAC Kénitra (a) | 1 | 2 | 3
Difaâ El Jadidi (a) | 1 | 2 | 3
Raja Casablanca | 1 | 2 | 3
Amal Souk Sebt | 2 | 3 | 5
Youssoufia Berrechid | 0 | 1 | 1
JS Massira | 2 | 2 | 4
Raja Beni Mellal | 1 | 2 | 3
Rachad Bernoussi | 1 | 0 | 1
RSB Berkane | 1 | 3 | 4
US Témara | 1 | 1 | 2
MAS Fez | 4 | 6 | 10
Wydad Casablanca | 5 | 2 | 7
US Amal Tiznit | 0 | 0 | 0
CR Al Hoceima (a) | 1 | 2 | 3
HL Oujda | 0 | 3 | 3
MC Oujda | 0 | 1 | 1
FAR Rabat | 3 | 1 | 4
Renaissance Martil | 1 | 0 | 1
Ittihad Khemisset | 1 | 1 | 2
Rajaa Jadida | 0 | 2 | 2
Hassania Agadir | 3 | 4 | 7
IR Tanger | 4 | 0 | 4
Moghreb Tétouan | 0 | 2 | 2
Kawkab Marrakech | 1 | 0 | 1
OC Khouribga | 2 | 0 | 2

Round of 16
Olympic Safi | 2 | 1 | 3
Union Sidi Kacem | 1 | 0 | 1
Fath Union Sport | 2 | 2 | 4
KAC Kénitra | 1 | 0 | 1
Difaâ El Jadidi | 3 | 3 | 6
Amal Souk Sebt | 1 | 0 | 1
JS Massira | 1 | 0 | 1
RSB Berkane (a) | 1 | 0 | 1
MAS Fez | 1 | 1 | 2
Wydad Casablanca | 0 | 1 | 1
CR Al Hoceima | 0 | 1 | 1
FAR Rabat | 4 | 1 | 5
Ittihad Khemisset | 1 | 1 | 2
Hassania Agadir | 0 | 0 | 0
IR Tanger | 2 | 1 | 3
OC Khouribga | 0 | 1 | 1

Quarter-finals
Olympic Safi (p) | 3 | 0 | 3
Fath Union Sport | 0 | 3 | 3
Difaâ El Jadidi | 3 | 0 | 3
RSB Berkane | 1 | 0 | 1
MAS Fez (p) | 0 | 1 | 1
FAR Rabat | 1 | 0 | 1
Ittihad Khemisset | 1 | 0 | 1
IR Tanger | 1 | 1 | 2

Semi-finals
Olympic Safi (p) | 1 | 0 | 1
Difaâ El Jadidi | 0 | 1 | 1
MAS Fez (a) | 0 | 1 | 1
IR Tanger | 0 | 1 | 1

Final
Olympic Safi | 1
MAS Fez (a.e.t.) | 2

== Round of 16 ==
- 1/16th finals of the Moroccan Throne Cup First leg: 10/11/12 June 2016
- 1/16th finals of the Moroccan Throne Cup Second leg: 17/18/19 June 2016

Draw of the 2016 Moroccan Throne Cup season

| Team 1 | Agg. | Team 2 | 1st leg | 2nd leg |
|---|---|---|---|---|
| IR Tanger | 4 - 2 | Moghreb Tétouan | 4 - 0 | 0 - 2 |
| US Témara | 2 - 10 | MAS Fez | 1 - 4 | 1 - 6 |
| Chabab Rif Al Hoceima | (a) 3 - 3 | Hassania Lazari Oujda | 1 - 0 | 2 - 3 |
| Wydad Témara | 4 - 5 | Union Sidi Kacem | 2 - 2 | 2 - 3 |
| MC Oujda | 1 - 4 | FAR Rabat | 0 - 3 | 1 - 1 |
| Rachad Bernoussi | 1 - 4 | RSB Berkane | 1 - 1 | 0 - 3 |
| Renaissance Martil | 1 - 2 | Ittihad Khemisset | 1 - 1 | 0 - 1 |
| Fath Wislan Meknes | 3 - 3 (a) | KAC Kénitra | 3 - 1 | 0 - 2 |
| Difaâ El Jadidi | (a) 3 - 3 | Raja Casablanca | 1 - 1 | 2 - 2 |
| Kawkab Marrakech | 1 - 2 | Olympique Khouribga | 1 - 2 | 0 - 0 |
| Racing de Casablanca | 2 - 6 | Fath Union Sport | 1 - 2 | 1 - 4 |
| Wydad Casablanca | 7 - 0 | Union Sportif Amal Tiznit | 5 - 0 | 2 - 0 |
| Olympique Marrakech | 2 - 11 | Olympic Safi | 1 - 4 | 1 - 7 |
| JS Massira | 4 - 3 | Raja Beni Mellal | 2 - 1 | 2 - 2 |
| Amal Souk Sebt | 5 - 1 | Youssoufia Berrechid | 2 - 0 | 3 - 1 |
| Club Rajaa Sportive Jadida | 2 - 7 | Hassania Agadir | 0 - 3 | 2 - 4 |

== Round of 8 ==
- 1/8th finals of the Coupe du Trône First leg: 2–7 September 2016
- 1/8th finals of the Coupe du Trône Second leg: 9–10 September 2016

| Team 1 | Agg. | Team 2 | 1st leg | 2nd leg |
|---|---|---|---|---|
| Olympic Safi | 3 - 1 | Union Sidi Kacem | 2 - 1 | 1 - 0 |
| Fath Union Sport | 4 - 1 | KAC Kénitra | 2 - 1 | 2 - 0 |
| Difaâ El Jadidi | 6 - 1 | Amal Souk Sebt | 3 - 1 | 3 - 0 |
| JS Massira | 1 - 1 (a) | RSB Berkane | 1 - 1 | 0 - 0 |
| MAS Fez | 2 - 1 | Wydad Casablanca | 1 - 0 | 1 - 1 |
| Chabab Rif Al Hoceima | 1 - 5 | FAR Rabat | 0 - 4 | 1 - 1 |
| Ittihad Khemisset | 2 - 0 | Hassania Agadir | 1 - 0 | 1 - 0 |
| IR Tanger | 3 - 1 | Olympique Khouribga | 2 - 0 | 1 - 1 |

== Quarter-finals ==
- 1/4th finals of the Moroccan Throne Cup First leg: 27–28 September 2016
- 1/4th finals of the Moroccan Throne Cup Second leg: 1–2 October 2016

| Team 1 | Agg. | Team 2 | 1st leg | 2nd leg |
|---|---|---|---|---|
| Olympic Safi | 3 - 3 (4–2 p) | Fath Union Sport | 3 - 0 | 0 - 3 |
| Difaâ El Jadidi | 3 - 1 | RSB Berkane | 3 - 1 | 0 - 0 |
| MAS Fez | 1 - 1 (4–2 p) | FAR Rabat | 0 - 1 | 1 - 0 |
| Ittihad Khemisset | 1 - 2 | IR Tanger | 1 - 1 | 0 - 1 |

== Semi-finals ==
- Semi-finals of the Coupe du Trône First leg: 19 October 2016
- Semi-finals of the Coupe du Trône Second leg: 2 November 2016

| Team 1 | Agg. | Team 2 | 1st leg | 2nd leg |
|---|---|---|---|---|
| Olympic Safi | 1 - 1 (3–0 p) | Difaâ El Jadidi | 0 - 1 | 1 - 0 |
| MAS Fez | (a) 1 - 1 | IR Tanger | 0 - 0 | 1 - 1 |

== Final ==
18 November 2016
16:00 UTC

| OC Safi | 1–2 (a.e.t.) | MAS Fez |
|---|---|---|
| Namli 67' (pen.) | Report | Guiza 3', 99' |

Sheikh Laghdaf, Laayoune, Laayoune
Referee: Redouane Jiyed

== See also ==
- 2015–16 Botola
- 2017 CAF Confederation Cup
