= Youssef Tourabi =

Moroccan footballer (born 1989)

Personal information
- Full name: Youssef Tourabi
- Date of birth: 18 April 1989 (age 37)
- Place of birth: Ben Guerir, Morocco
- Height: 1.82 m (6 ft 0 in)
- Position: Centre back

Team information
- Current team: Moghreb Tétouan
- Number: 99

Youth career
- Wydad Casablanca

Senior career*
Years	Team	Apps	(Gls)
2007–2010	Wydad Casablanca	13	(4)
2010–2011	FAR Rabat	9	(0)
2011–2012	Kénitra		
2013–2014	Olympique Safi	27	(0)
2014–2016	Kénitra	45	(1)
2016–2018	RSB Berkane	33	(2)
2018–2019	FUS Rabat	8	(0)
2019–	Moghreb Tétouan	7	(0)

International career^{‡}
2006–2008	Morocco U20		
2008–	Morocco	1	(0)
- * Club domestic league appearances and goals as of 17:51, 4 January 2020 (UTC) ‡ National team caps and goals as of 17 October 2008 (UTC)

Youssef Tourabi (born 18 April 1989) is a Moroccan footballer, who plays for Moghreb Tétouan.

== Career ==
He began his career with Wydad Casablanca and signed on 3 June 2008 here his first professional contract between 30 June 2013.

== International career ==
Tourabi played his first international game for the senior team from Morocco against Oman national football team.
