= Abdelkhalek Louzani =

Moroccan footballer and coach (1945–2021)

Personal information
- Date of birth: 13 July 1945
- Place of birth: Essaouira, Morocco
- Date of death: 6 February 2021 (aged 75)
- Place of death: Essaouira, Morocco
- Position: Midfielder

Youth career
- 1960–1963: ASS Essaouira

Senior career*
Years	Team	Apps	(Gls)
1963–1967	Anderlecht		
1967–1977	Crossing Elewijt		
1977–1982	Olympic Charleroi		

Managerial career
- 1982–1983: Moghreb Tétouan
- 1983–1985: Olympique Khouribga
- 1985–1986: FUS Rabat
- 1986–1987: Moghreb Tétouan
- 1987–1988: Ittihad Tanger
- 1988–1990: Olympique Khouribga
- 1990–1992: Kawkab Marrakech
- 1992–1993: Morocco
- 1993–1996: Olympique Khouribga
- Chabab d'Al Massira
- COD Meknès
- KAC Kénitra
- Olympic Club de Safi
- * Club domestic league appearances and goals

Abdelkhalek Louzani (13 July 1945 – 6 February 2021) was a Moroccan football player and coach.

== Playing career ==
Louzani began his career in 1960 with hometown club ASS Essaouira, and played professionally with Belgian clubs Anderlecht, Crossing Elewijt and Olympic Charleroi.

== Coaching career ==
Louzani began his coaching career in Belgium with Olympic Charleroi, before returning to Morocco in 1982.

He was manager of the Morocco national team in 1992 to 1993, and also managed a number of Moroccan club sides including Moghreb Tétouan, Olympique Khouribga, FUS Rabat, Ittihad Tanger, Kawkab Marrakech, Chabab d'Al Massira, COD Meknès, KAC Kénitra and Olympic Club de Safi.

== Death ==
Louzani died from COVID-19 in Essaouira on 6 February 2021, at age 75, during the COVID-19 pandemic in Morocco.
