= 2012–13 GNF 2 =

Botola Pro 2
- Season: 2012–13
- Promoted: KAC Marrakech; AS Sale
- Relegated: TAS Casablanca; Olympique Marrakech

The 2012–13 Botola Pro 2 was the 52nd season of Botola Pro 2 (the 2nd tier football league in Morocco). The season started on 15 September 2012 and ended on 2 June 2013.

On 28 April 2013, KAC Marrakech secure their promotion to Botola Pro after their victory against TAS Casablanca with score 1-0 in their home match, they also clinched their title after their goalless drew in their home match against MC Oujda on 18 May 2013. Later, AS Sale promoted after defeat Olympique Marrakech 2-0 in their away match on 25 May 2013 while IZ Khemisset defeat RAC Casablanca 1-0 in their home match four days later left them 6 points away from safety with only 1 game left.

On 18 May 2013, Olympique Marrakech was relegated to GNFA 1 for 2013-14 season after defeated by USM Oujda in their away match with 2-0 left them 7 points away from safety with only 2 game left. TAS Casablanca also relegated after defeated by same team (USM Oujda) in their away match with score 2-0 on 2 June 2013. US Temara ahead from TAS Casablanca on their goal difference (US Temara goal difference is -8 while TAS Casablanca goal difference is -10).

== Promotion and relegation ==
Teams promoted from 2011–12 GNFA 1

- Olympique Marrakech
- USM Oujda

Teams relegated from 2011–12 Botola Pro

- JS Massira
- IZ Khemisset

== League standings ==
Pos	Team	Pld	W	D	L	GF	GA	GD	Pts	Promotion or relegation
1	KAC Marrakech	30	19	8	3	44	12	+32	65	Promotion to Botola Pro
2	AS Sale	30	16	9	5	30	13	+17	57	Promotion to Botola Pro
3	IZ Khemisset	30	15	5	10	25	26	−1	50	
4	MC Oujda	30	12	13	5	30	20	+10	49	
5	CR Bernoussi	30	12	9	9	27	22	+5	45	
6	USM Aït Melloul	30	11	11	8	26	25	+1	44	
7	CAY Berrechid	30	10	9	11	34	38	−4	39	
8	USM Oujda	30	10	6	14	29	32	−3	36	
9	US Mohammédia	30	7	14	9	27	28	−1	35	
10	JS Kasba Tadla	30	9	8	13	19	22	−3	35	
11	RAC Casablanca	30	8	11	11	26	33	−7	35	
12	JS Massira	30	7	13	10	26	32	−6	34	
13	IR Tanger	30	8	9	13	28	35	−7	33	
14	US Temara	30	8	8	14	23	31	−8	32	
15	TAS Casablanca	30	7	11	12	17	27	−10	32	Relegation to 2013–14 GNFA 1
16	Olympique Marrakech	30	4	10	16	25	40	−15	22	Relegation to 2013–14 GNFA 1

Updated to match(es) played on 2 June 2013. Source: soccerway.com
Rules for classification: 1) points; 2) goal difference; 3) number of goals scored.
