= Namli (surname) =

Namli is a surname. Notable persons with that surname include:

- Erhan Namlı (born 1974), Turkish footballer
- Mehdi Namli (born 1987), Moroccan footballer
- Younes Namli (born 1994), Danish footballer
