= El Khaldi Maaroufi =

Moroccan footballer (born 1979)

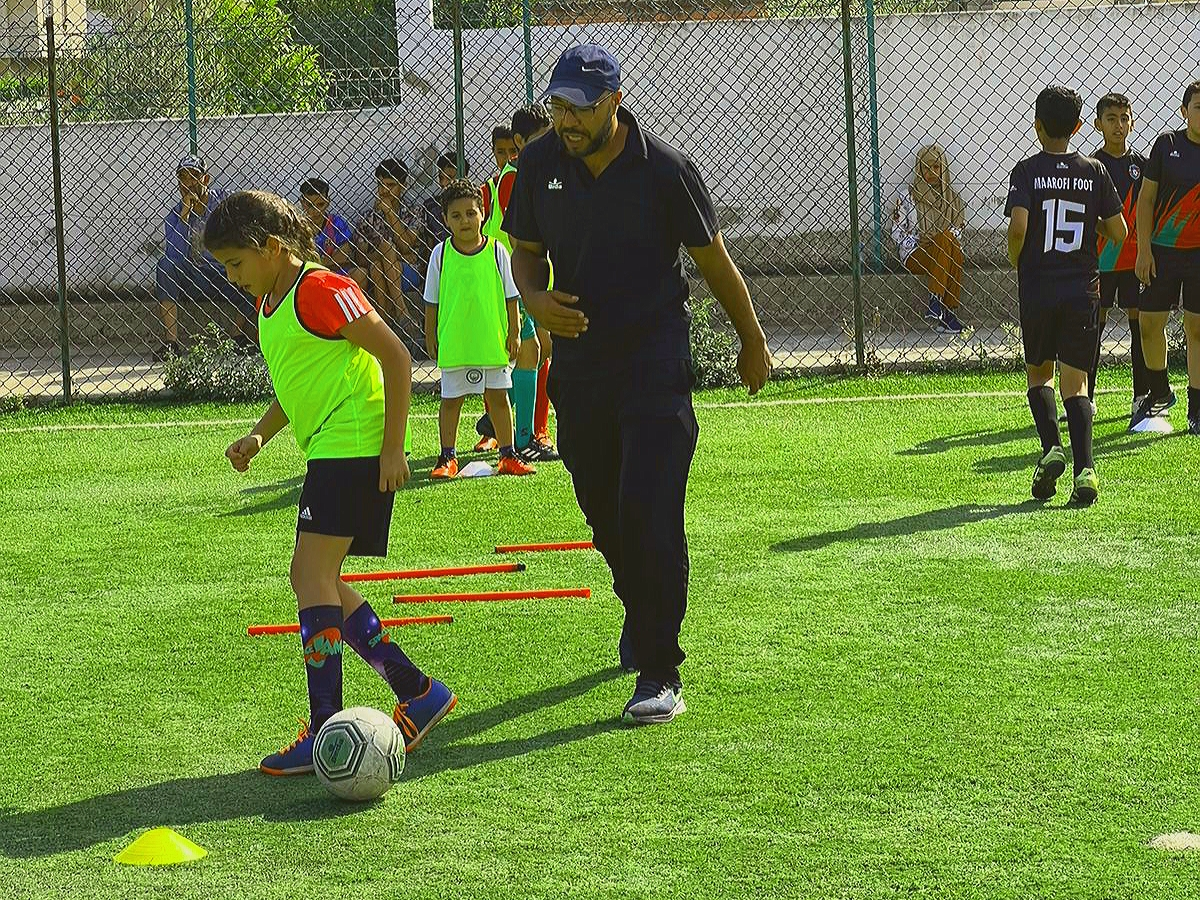

Personal information
- Date of birth: 14 April 1979 (age 47)
- Place of birth: Khouribga, Morocco
- Position: Winger

Senior career*
Years	Team	Apps	(Gls)
2003–2005	FAR Rabat		
2005–2008	Moghreb Tétouan		
- * Club domestic league appearances and goals

El Khaldi Maaroufi (Arabic: الخالدي المعروفي; born 14 April 1979) is a Moroccan international footballer. He started his career with FAR Rabat, making his debut in 2004. He joined Moghreb Tétouan in 2005, but returned to FAR Rabat for the 2008 He represented Morocco four times and was selected for the Coupe du Trône.

Maaroufi was selected by Morocco for the 2004 Africa Cup of Nations, played for the FAR Rabat side that won the 2008 Coupe du Trône

== Career ==
Maaroufi won the 2008 Coupe du Trône with FAR Rabat.

Maaroufi His training club is Moghreb Tétouan.

Maaroufi His training club is Olympique Club de Khouribga most of his career and in the national team of Morocco.

Maaroufi He was transferred from FAR Rabat during the 2008 winter transfer window.
