= 2015–16 Botola 2 =

Botola 2
- Season: 2015–16
- Promoted: Chabab Atlas Khenifra; JS de Kasbah Tadla
- Relegated: Olympique Marrakech; CODM Meknes
- Matches: 240
- Goals: 445 (1.85 per match)

The 2015–16 Botola 2 was the 54th season of Botola 2, the second division of the Moroccan football league. The season was started on the 5 September 2015 and concluded the 15 May 2016. The season break was from 9 until 29 January 2016.

== Team change ==
=== Teams relegated from 2014–15 Botola ===
- Ittihad Khemisset
- Chabab Atlas Khenifra

=== Teams promoted from 2014–15 GNFA 1 ===
- Rachad Bernoussi
- Olympique Marrakech

== Table ==
Pos	Team	Pld	W	D	L	GF	GA	GD	Pts	Promotion or relegation
1	Chabab Atlas Khenifra (C, P)	30	11	16	3	30	21	+9	49 (Note: Chabab Atlas Khenifra ahed on goal difference (Chabab Atlas Khenifra +9, JS Kasba Tadla +4).)	Promotion to Botola Pro
2	JS de Kasbah Tadla (P)	30	13	10	7	24	20	+4	49	Promotion to Botola Pro
3	AS Salé	30	10	12	8	32	29	+3	42	
4	Rachad Bernoussi	30	10	11	9	31	27	+4	41	
5	Club Athletic Youssoufia Berrechid	30	10	11	9	27	25	+2	41 (Note: Youssoufia Berrechid 0-0 US Temara (Round 3), US Temara 0-0 Youssoufia Berrechid (Round 18).)	
6	US Témara	30	10	11	9	31	29	+2	41	
7	RAC Casablanca	30	12	5	13	37	38	−1	41	
8	Olympique Dcheira	30	8	15	7	20	21	−1	39	
9	Raja Beni Mellal	30	10	9	11	24	29	−5	39	
10	JSM Laayoune	30	10	8	12	35	32	+3	38	
11	Ittihad Khemisset	30	9	11	10	23	22	+1	38	
12	Wydad Témara	30	7	16	7	26	22	+4	37	
13	Union Aït Melloul	30	10	7	13	29	28	+1	37	
14	Wydad de Fès	30	10	7	13	28	32	−4	37 (Note: Wydad de Fès ahead from Olympique Marrakech on number of goals scored (Wydad Fes 28 goals, Olympique Marrakech 24 goals))	
15	Olympique Marrakech (R)	30	9	10	11	24	28	−4	37	Relegation to GNFA 1
16	CODM Meknes (R)	30	8	7	15	24	42	−18	31	Relegation to GNFA 1

Updated to match(es) played on 15 May 2016. Source:
Rules for classification: 1) points; 2) goal difference; 3) number of goals scored.
(C) Champions; (P) Promoted; (R) Relegated
