= Massira =

Massira may refer to:

- Massira, Marrakech, a sector of Marrakesh made up of several small neighborhoods and housing estates. It is located in the Menara district located to the west of the city.
- Al Massira Airport, Agadir, Morocco international airport
- Jeunesse Massira, a sport club
- Stade El Massira, a multi-use stadium in Safi, Morocco
