= Ayoub Lakhal =

Moroccan footballer

Personal information
- Date of birth: 7 July 1996 (age 30)
- Place of birth: Tétouan, Morocco
- Position: Midfielder

Team information
- Current team: SCC Mohammedia

Senior career*
| Years | Team | Apps | (Gls) |
| 2015–2016 | Moghreb Tétouan | | |
| 2016–2017 | Olympique Club de Khouribga | 2 | (0) |
| 2018–2021 | Moghreb Tétouan | 56 | (12) |
| 2021–2022 | Maghreb de Fès | 17 | (0) |
| 2022– | SCC Mohammédia | | |
- * Club domestic league appearances and goals

Ayoub Lakhal (Arabic: أيوب لكحل; born July 7, 1996) is a Moroccan footballer currently playing for Botola club SCC Mohammédia as a midfielder.
