= Mehdi Namli =

Moroccan footballer

Personal information
- Full name: Mehdi Namli
- Date of birth: 23 June 1987 (age 39)
- Place of birth: Safi, Morocco
- Height: 1.87 m (6 ft 2 in)
- Position: Attacking midfielder

Team information
- Current team: KAC Kénitra

Youth career
- 1996–2007: Olympic Safi

Senior career*
Years	Team	Apps	(Gls)
2007–2010	Olympic Safi	72	(18)
2010–2012	Clermont	41	(3)
2012–2015	Moghreb Tétouan	68	(14)
2015–2019	Olympic Safi	76	(9)
2019–	KAC Kénitra		

International career
2008	Morocco U-23		
- * Club domestic league appearances and goals as of 23:05, 19 December 2019 (UTC)

Mehdi Namli (born 23 June 1987) is a Moroccan footballer who plays for KAC Kénitra as an attacking midfielder.

== Career ==
Namli previously played for Moroccan side Olympique Safi. He signed a two-year contract with Ligue 2 club Clermont Foot in July 2010.
