= Ahmed Alami Elouali =

Moroccan footballer

Ahmed Alami El ouali
Personal information
- Full name: Ahmed El Ouali Alami
- Date of birth: December 10, 1982 (age 43)
- Place of birth: Kenitra, Morocco
- Height: 1.69 m (5 ft 6 1/2 in)
- Position: Defender

Team information
- Current team: Wydad Casablanca

Youth career
- KAC Kenitra

Senior career*
Years	Team	Apps	(Gls)
?–2008	KAC Kenitra	75	(1)
2008–	Wydad Casablanca		
- * Club domestic league appearances and goals as of April 16, 2009 ‡ National team caps and goals as of October 17, 2008

Ahmed Alami Elouali (born 10 October 1982) is a Moroccan footballer, he is currently attached to Wydad Casablanca.

== Career ==
Hamada moved in July 2008 from KAC Kenitra to Wydad Casablanca.
