= Bilal El Megri =

Moroccan footballer

Personal information
- Date of birth: 8 August 1990 (age 36)
- Place of birth: Tétouan, Morocco
- Height: 1.80 m (5 ft 11 in)
- Position: Winger

Senior career*
Years	Team	Apps	(Gls)
2016–2017	OCK	26	(8)
2017-2020	DHJ	23	(14)
2020-2023	RC Oued Zem		
2023-	MA Tétouan		
- * Club domestic league appearances and goals

Bilal El Megri (born 8 August 1990) is a Moroccan footballer as of 2017 playing for DHJ as a winger.
