= Charly Rössli =

Swiss footballer (born 1961)

Personal information
- Full name: Charles-Albert Rössli
- Date of birth: 17 March 1961 (age 65)
- Position: Forward

Senior career*
Years	Team	Apps	(Gls)
1980–1984	FC Sion		
1984–1985	CS Chênois		
1985–1986	FC Renens		
1986–1988	FC Bulle		
1988–1989	AC Bellinzona		
1989–1991	FC Malley		

Managerial career
- 2002: Club Africain
- 2003: FC Sion
- 2007: ES Sétif
- 2007–2008: FC Sion
- 2008: FC Sion (U21)
- 2011–2012: Wydad de Fès
- 2012–2013: Wydad de Fès
- 2013–2014: Maghreb de Fès
- * Club domestic league appearances and goals

Charly Rössli (born 17 March 1961) is a retired Swiss football striker and later manager.
