= Najah Souss =

Moroccan football club

- Full name: Najah Souss
- Founded: unknown
- League: GNFA 1 Sud
Home colours	Away colours

Najah Souss is a Moroccan football club currently playing in the third division. The club is located in the town of Agadir. The team has Stade Al Inbiaâte as its official stadium.
