= Wydad Serghini =

Moroccan football club

- Full name: Wydad Serghini
- Founded: 1953
- Ground: Stade Municipal d'El Kelaâ des Sraghna
- League: National
- 2024–25: National, 7th of 16
Home colours	Away colours

Wydad Serghini is a Moroccan football club based in Kalaat Sraghna currently playing in the National.
