= Youssef Meriana =

Moroccan footballer

Youssef Mariana
Personal information
- Date of birth: 13 May 1974 (age 52)
- Place of birth: Marrakesh, Morocco
- Height: 1.85 m (6 ft 1 in)
- Position: Midfielder

Youth career
- ?–1994: Kawkab Marrakech

Senior career*
Years	Team	Apps	(Gls)
1994–2000	Kawkab Marrakech	-	(-)
2000	Al-Shabab	-	(-)
2000–2004	Willem II Tilburg	92	(4)
2004–2006	Wydad Casablanca	-	(-)
2006–2013	Kawkab Marrakech	77	(12)

International career
1998–2002	Morocco	10	(0)
- * Club domestic league appearances and goals

Youssef Mariana (born 13 May 1974) is a Moroccan former footballer who played as a midfielder.
