= Botola Pro D2 =

Botola Pro 2
- Organising body: Royal Moroccan Football Federation; Ligue Nationale de Football Professionnel
- Founded: 11 June 1915; 111 years ago (Note: Came under the authority of the FRMF in 1956.)
- Country: Morocco
- Confederation: CAF
- Number of clubs: 16
- Level on pyramid: 2
- Promotion to: Botola Pro
- Relegation to: Amateur National
- Domestic cup(s): Throne Cup; Excellence Cup
- International cup: CAF Confederation Cup (via Throne Cup)
- Current champions: MA Tétouan (2025–26)
- Most championships: Moghreb Tétouan (7 times)
- Broadcaster: SNRT (Arryadia)
- Website: frmf.ma
- Current: 2026–27 Botola Pro 2

Botola Pro 2 (Arabic: البطولة الوطنية الإحترافية الثانية, romanized: al-Buṭūla al-Waṭaniyya al-Iḥtirāfiyya al-thaania, lit. 'Professional National Championship 2'), officially known as Botola Pro 2 Inwi for sponsorship reasons, is a professional association football league in Morocco and the second tier of the Moroccan football league system. Organized by the Ligue Nationale de Football Professionnel (LNFP), under the authority of the Royal Moroccan Football Federation (FRMF), the league features 16 clubs and operates on a system of promotion and relegation with Botola Pro.

The league was created on June 11, 1915, in Morocco during the French protectorate, by the Moroccan Federation of Athletic Sports (FMSA), and was governed by the FMSA until 1922, when the Morocco Football Association League took over.

MA Tétouan is the most successful clubs in the competition, with 7 titles. MA Tétouan is the current title holder.

== History ==
From 1915 to 1957, during the French Protectorate in Morocco, the Moroccan national championship was administered by three federations: USFSA - CR Maroc (1915 to 1917), Fédération Marocaine des Sports Athlétiques (1917 to 1921), and the Moroccan League of Association Football (1921 to 1957).

The championship of the first division promotion, as it was known since its founding in 1924, ran concurrently with the Moroccan Division of Honour competition and consisted of two groups: North and South. The clubs who placed first and second in each of the division's two regions—the Chaouia League and the Sultanate League—advanced to the semi-finals, where a single champion and runner-up would face off.

=== During Morocco's French Protectorate, which ran from 1915 to 1956 ===
The Independence Cup was established in 1956, the year of independence, to divide the clubs into various categories for the next United Kingdom championship season. To replace the clubs below (the French protectors' clubs) in the first division, the top teams in the competition that were not among the elite would compete in play-off matches.

== Winners ==
=== After 1996 ===
- 1995–96 : HUS Agadir
- 1996–97 : MAS Fez
- 1997–98 : FUS Rabat
- 1998–99 : RS Settat
- 1999–00 : RAC Casablanca
- 2000–01 : IR Tanger
- 2001–02 : Kénitra AC
- 2002–03 : MC Oujda
- 2003–04 : OC Safi
- 2004–05 : MA Tetouan
- 2005–06 : MAS Fez
- 2006–07 : FUS Rabat
- 2007–08 : AS Salé
- 2008–09 : FUS Rabat
- 2009–10 : JS Kasba Tadla
- 2010–11 : COD Meknès
- 2011–12 : Raja Beni Mellal
- 2012–13 : KAC Marrakech
- 2013–14 : IZ Khemisset
- 2014–15 : IR Tanger
- 2015–16 : CA Khénifra
- 2016–17 : RC Oued Zem
- 2017–18 : MC Oujda
- 2018–19 : RCA Zemamra
- 2019–20 : SCC Mohammédia
- 2020–21 : OC Khouribga
- 2021–22 : MA Tétouan
- 2022–23 : RCA Zemamra
- 2023–24 : COD Meknès
- 2024–25 : KAC Marrakech
- 2025–26 : MA Tétouan

== Relegated clubs ==
=== Relegated teams (From Botola Pro to Botola Pro 2) since 1986 ===
Season	Relegated from Botola Pro
1986–87	COD Meknès, AS Salé, CC Sakia Hamra, RS Kénitra, RS Berkane, UTS Rabat, DH El-Jadida, ACK Belksiri
1987–88	RS Settat, US Mohammédia, SCC Mohammédia, MC Oujda
1988–89	COD Meknès, HA Nador
1989–90	Wydad Fès, FA Ben Slimane
1990–91	US Sidi Kacem, MA Tétouan
1991–92	TAS Casablanca, USM Oujda
1992–93	DH El-Jadida, Raja Beni Mellal
1993–94	HUS Agadir, OC Khouribga, US Sidi Kacem, CR Bernoussi
1994–95	CO Casablanca (dissolved), Kénitra AC, FUS Rabat, MAS Fès
1995–96	TAS Casablanca, IR Tanger
1996–97	US Sidi Kacem, MA Tétouan
1997–98	RS Settat, IR Tanger
1998–99	DH El-Jadida, MC Oujda
1999–00	Wydad Fez, Sporting Salé
2000–01	SCC Mohammédia, RAC Casablanca
2001–02	Stade Marocain, Raja Beni Mellal
2002–03	TS Casablanca (disbanded), FUS Rabat
2003–04	RS Settat, Kénitra AC
2004–05	MAS Fès, KAC Marrakech
2005–06	SCC Mohammédia, UTS Rabat
2006–07	IR Tanger, AS Salé
2007–08	FUS Rabat, CODM Meknès
2008–09	MC Oujda, SCC Mohammédia
2009–10	IZ Khemisset, AS Salé
2010–11	KAC Marrakech, JS Kasba Tadla
2011–12	JS Massira, IZ Khemisset
2012–13	COD Meknès, Raja Beni Mellal
2013–14	AS Salé, Wydad Fès
2014–15	CA Khénifra, IZ Khemisset
2015–16	MC Oujda, MAS Fès
2016–17	JS Kasba Tadla, Kénitra AC
2017–18	CA Khénifra, RAC Casablanca
2018–19	KAC Marrakech, CR Al-Hoceima
2019–20	OC Khouribga, Raja Beni Mellal
2020–21	MA Tétouan, RCA Zemamra
2021–22	Rapide Oued Zem, CAY Berrechid
2022–23	OC Khouribga, Difaa El Jadida
2023–24	MC Oujda, CAY Berrechid
2024–25	SCC Mohammédia, MA Tétouan, JS Soualem (play-offs)
2025–26	OC Safi, US Yacoub Mansour, Olympique Dcheira (play-offs)

== See also ==
- Botola Pro
- Amateur National
