= Marrakesh Stadium =

Football stadium in Marrakesh, Morocco

Coordinates: 31°42′24″N 7°58′50″W

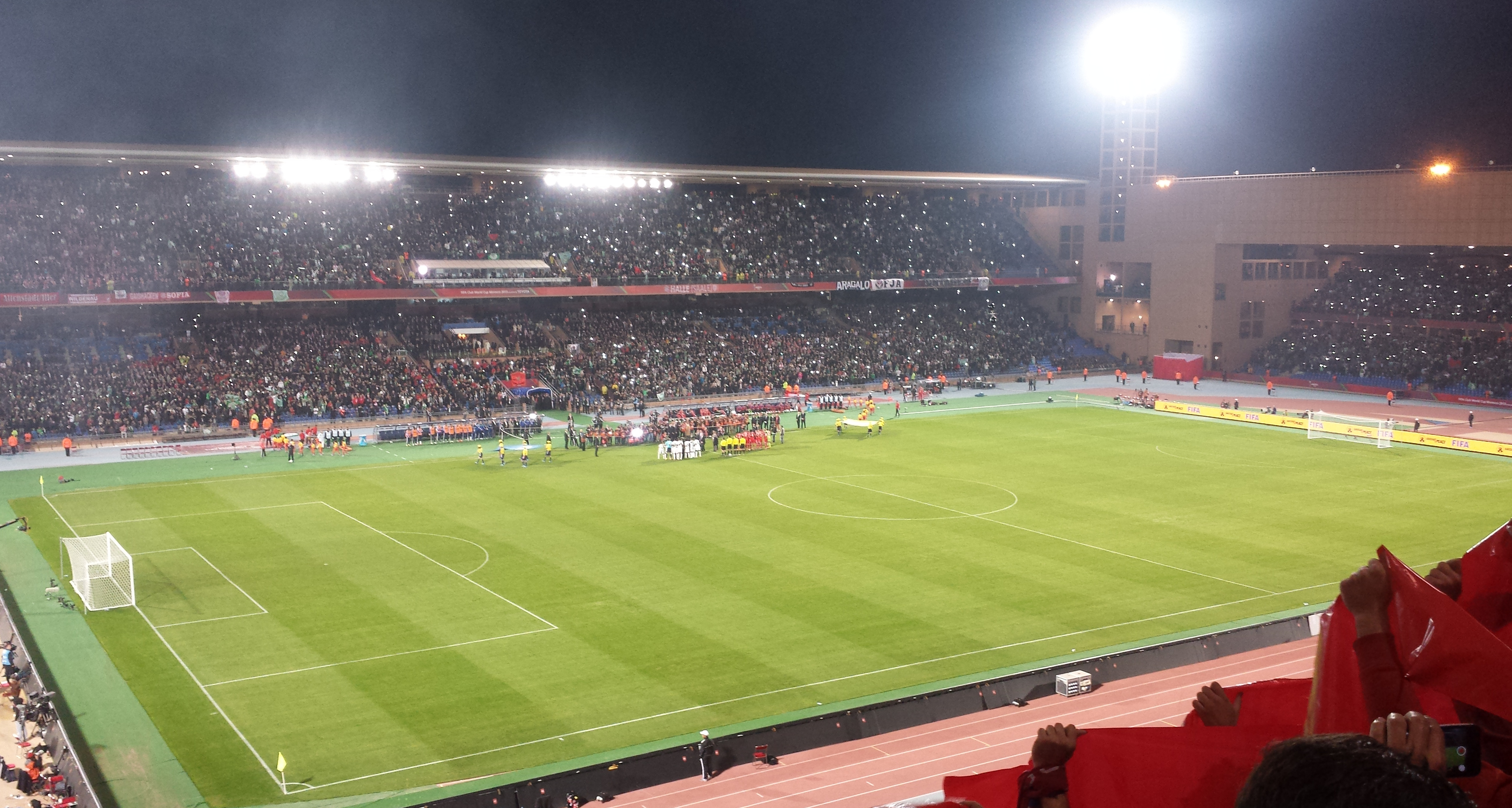
- Marrakesh Stadium in 2013
- Interactive map of Marrakesh Stadium
- Full name: الملعب الكبير بمدينة مراكش
- Location: Marrakesh, Morocco
- Capacity: 45,240
- Surface: Grass

Construction
- Opened: January 5, 2011
- Architect: Gregotti Associati

Tenants
- KAC Marrakech (2011–present); Morocco national football team (selected matches)

The Marrakesh Stadium (Arabic: ملعب مراكش, Berber: ⴰⵏⵏⴰⵔ ⵏ ⵎⵔⵔⴰⴽⵛ) is a multi-use stadium in Marrakesh, Morocco. Opened in January 2011, it replaces Stade Al Harti as the main association football stadium of the city, with a capacity for 45,240 spectators.

The Kawkab Marrakesh football team plays its home matches at the stadium. It has hosted several matches of the 2014 FIFA Club World Cup and the 2025 Africa Cup of Nations, and is scheduled to host the 2030 FIFA World Cup which Morocco will co-host along with Portugal and Spain. The venue has an athletics track, which has been used for the 2014 IAAF Continental Cup and the 2014 African Championships in Athletics.

== History ==
=== Construction ===
Launched in September 2003, the construction of the stadium lasted 7 years and 3 months. It was designed by Gregotti Associati. Inauguration took place on January 5, 2011, with friendlies involving two Moroccan teams; Kawkab Marrakech and Wydad Casablanca facing two French teams; Olympique Lyonnais and Paris Saint Germain.

=== Criticism ===
After more than seven years in construction, the Marrakchis people and the contributors unveiled the first stadium in the world to be both rectangular and host a running track. The criticism from that branched from these constructive decisions is that the distance from the running track to the stands is much too far. Considered a fault to the builders, the space contrast is attributed to a lack of potential spectators in the stadium, who avoid the stadium due to poor vision.

=== Means of access ===
The stadium is located 11 kilometres (7 mi) north of Marrakesh. It is served by the international airport Marrakesh - Menara at fourteen kilometres, and the railway station of the city. Access to the stadium is provided by sixteen doors and a grand entrance.

== See also ==
- List of football stadiums in Morocco
- Lists of stadiums

== International events ==
The stadium hosted the following international events:

- 2013 FIFA Club World Cup Final
- 2014 FIFA Club World Cup Final
- 2025 Africa Cup of Nations
