= El Massira Stadium =

Football stadium in Safi, Morocco

Coordinates: 32°18′01″N 9°13′46″W

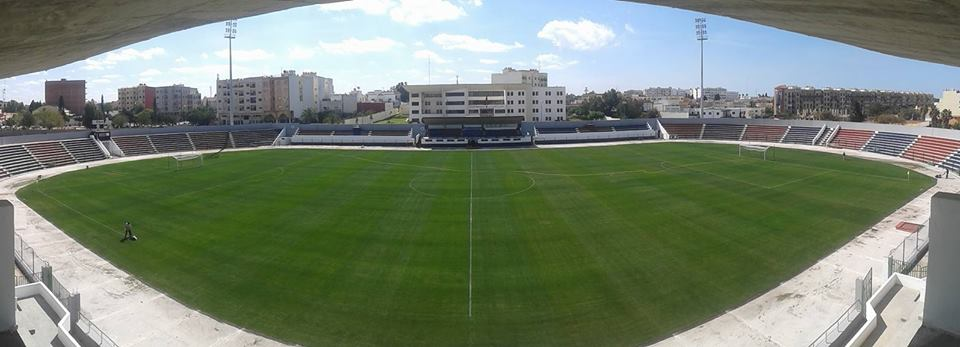
- Interactive map of El Massira Stadium
- Location: Safi
- Owner: Safi Municipality
- Capacity: 20,000
- Surface: grass

Construction
- Opened: 1936

Tenant
- OC Safi

The El-Massira El-Khadra stadium (Arabic: ملعب المسيرة الخضراء) colloquially known as El Massira, is a stadium located in Safi, Morocco. The official stadium of Olympic Club Safi since 1936.

It hosts the team's home matches. It has a capacity of 20,000 seats. It was equipped with artificial turf in 2011.

The stadium was built by the French authorities, at the time of the French protectorate in Morocco. Its name "Al Massira" means "the march" and refers to the Green March.
