= HA Nador =

Moroccan sports club

Hilal Nador
- Full name: Hilal Athletic Nador
- Founded: 7 May 1956
- League: Amateurs I
- 2024–25: Amateurs I, 4th of 16
Home colours	Away colours

Hilal Nador or Hilal Athletic de Nador (en Arabic: الهلال الرياضي الناظوري), is a Moroccan sports club from Nador. Founded in 1956. It is considered the first club in the city, and with Fath Nador it forms the two football poles in the city.
