= JS Kasba Tadla =

Moroccan football club

- Full name: Jeunesse Sportive de Kasba Tadla
- Short name: JSKT
- Founded: 1946; 79 years ago
- Ground: Stade du Phosphate
- Capacity: 10,000
- Manager: Abdelmalek El Aziz
- League: Amateurs I
- 2024–25: Amateurs I, 4th of 16
Home colours	Away colours	Third colours

Jeunesse Sportive de Kasba Tadla (JSKT) is a Moroccan football club founded in 1946, based in the town of Kasba Tadla. The club plays in the Amateurs I in Morocco.

== History ==
JS de Tadla were promoted to Botola 2 (D2) in 2009.

In 2010, after just one season in Botola 2, the club were Second Division Champions, and were promoted to the Botola (1st division).

In 2011 after only one season in Botola (1st division), the club was relegated to the second division of Moroccan football Botola 2 along with KAC Marrakech after having finished last in the division.

The team played in the Moroccan Throne Cup in 2019, 2022, and 2023, but has never progressed past the first round.

== Honours ==
- Botola 2: 1

2010

- Champion du Maroc GNFA 1 - Groupe Centre: 1

2009
