= Maghreb Fez =

Moroccan sports club

MAS
- Full name: Maghreb Association Sportive of Fez المغرب الرياضي الفاسي
- Nickname: النمور الصفر (Yellow Tigers)
- Short name: MAS
- Founded: 16 October 1946; 80 years ago
- Ground: Fez Stadium
- Capacity: 45,000
- Chairman: Mohamed Bouzoubaa
- Manager: Amine El Karma
- League: Botola Pro
- 2025–26: Botola Pro, 1st of 16 (champions)
- Website: www.maghreb-fes.com
Home colours	Away colours	Third colours

Maghreb Fez (Arabic: المغرب الرياضي الفاسي), commonly known as MAS, is a Moroccan professional football club based in Fez, which competes in the Botola Pro, the top division of the Moroccan football league system.

Founded on 16 October 1946 in Fez, Maghreb Fez is one of the oldest sports clubs in Morocco. During the protectorate period, the club also had a social and political dimension. Several of its founders and members were involved in the Moroccan national movement, and sporting activities sometimes served as a framework for meetings linked to independence efforts. More broadly, clubs such as Maghreb Fez contributed to the expression of a national identity distinct from colonial influence.

Maghreb Fez has established itself as one of the notable clubs in Moroccan football. At the domestic level, it has won 11 major titles, including 5 Botola Pro championships, four Throne Cup titles and two second-division titles. At the continental level, the club has won the CAF Confederation Cup and the CAF Super Cup.

== History ==
Maghreb Fez is considered one of the founding clubs of Moroccan football. Since its establishment in 1946, it has played an early role in national competitions, notably becoming the first non-French team to reach the later stages of the French Cup, where it faced Red Star FC.

Following the creation of the Moroccan championship, Maghreb Fez established itself among the competitive clubs in the league. The club developed its own organizational structure, including administrative management and financial resources supported by local figures in the city.

In the 1960s and 1970s, the club reached several finals of the Moroccan Throne Cup but was unsuccessful in 1966, 1971 and 1974. The club eventually won its first league title in 1979, with a squad that included players such as Mohammed Hazzaz and Abdallah Tazi.

This success was followed by a period of consolidation in the 1980s. The club won its first Throne Cup in 1980, shortly after its 1979 league title, and added two further league titles in 1983 and 1985.

In 1988, Maghreb Fez won the 1987–88 Moroccan Throne Cup after defeating FAR Rabat on penalties (4–2) in the final.

The club finished as runner-up in the Throne Cup on several occasions, including 1993, 2001, 2002, 2008 and 2010.

Maghreb Fez won the 2011 Moroccan Throne Cup after defeating COD Meknès 1–0 in the final. During the same campaign, the club eliminated Wydad AC in the semi-finals.

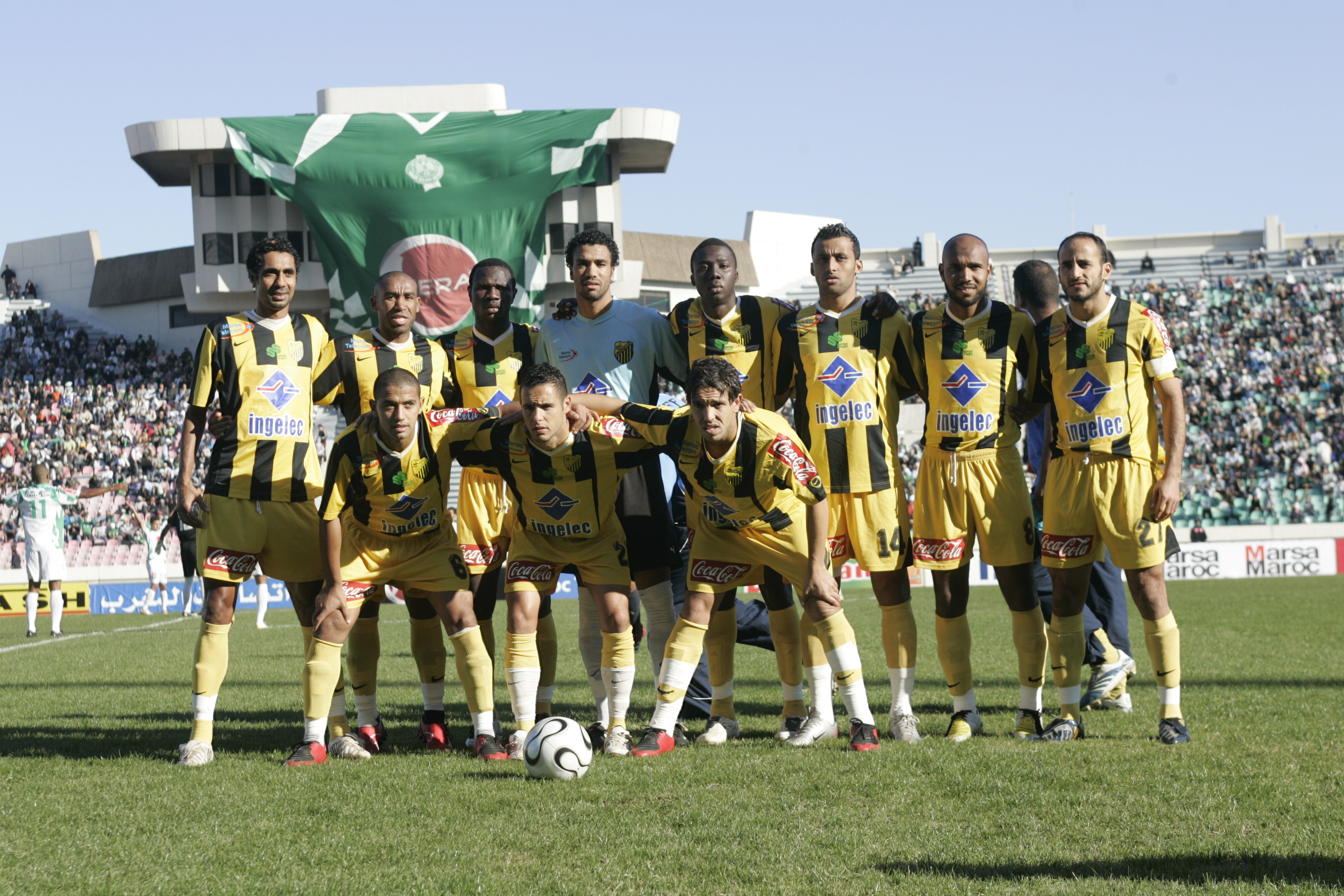
Maghreb Fez against Raja CA in 2008

In the 2011 CAF Confederation Cup, They played their first group match in Fez Stadium in which they won 1–0 against JS Kabylie, scored by Chemseddine Chtibi in the 85th minute. They drew their second against Motema Pembe and won their third against Sunshine Stars. Maghreb Fez won two and drew one of their 2nd leg matches, They defeated JS Kabylie (1–0) and defeated Motema Pembe (3–0), while they drew 1–1 against Sunshine Stars. Maghreb Fez qualified to the knockout stages after finishing top in the group stages winning four matches and drawing two. In the semi-finals they defeated G.D. Interclube on penalties. They were proclaimed Champions after defeating Club Africain in the final. They automatically qualified to the 2012 CAF Super Cup, in which they defeated Espérance ST and won their second African title for the team.

In 2016, they won their 4th Moroccan Throne Cup after defeating Olympic Safi (2–1) in the final, both goals scored by Guiza Djédjé.

In the 2025–26 season, Maghreb Fez won their fifth league title after defeating Olympique Dcheira in the final match of the season, ending a 41-year wait for the championship. Soufiane Benjdida finished as the league's top scorer.

== Grounds ==
The stadium has been welcoming the team since 2007 at the Fez Stadium, which has a capacity of 45,000 spectators. The construction of the sports complex began in early 1992, and it was expected to be completed in February 1997, as it was scheduled to host the African Youth Cup next to the honorary stadium of Meknes, but the failure to complete the workshops prevented that, after the completion period knew stops And several failures as a result of technical problems added to the original financial envelope in financing the project, which was what led the interests of the guardianship ministry and the urban group of Fez in 1999 to find another support for the completion of the project, The urban group contributed three million euros, and the concerned ministry contributed eight million euros, while the amount allocated for the completion of this sports landmark, which has a capacity of 45 thousand spectators, was estimated at 35 million euros. Construction and equipment works were completed in 2003.

Highest recorded attendance is 50,000 spectators on 4 December 2011, in which it witnessed Maghreb fez play against Club Africain in the 2011 CAF Confederation Cup final.

== Current squad ==
As of 17 November 2026

Note: Flags indicate national team as defined under FIFA eligibility rules; some limited exceptions apply. Players may hold more than one non-FIFA nationality.

No.	Pos.	Nation	Player
2	DF	MOZ	Diogo Calila
4	DF	SEN	Samba Mbengue
5	DF	MAR	Aymane Chbani
6	MF	MAR	Oussama Noureddine
7	FW	MAR	Khalid Baba
8	MF	MAR	Achraf Harmach
9	FW	RSA	Tshegofatso Mabaso
10	FW	FRA	Amine El Farissi
11	FW	NED	Soulyman Allouch
12	GK	MAR	Oussama Errahmany
13	DF	MAR	Adil Rhaili
14	FW	MAR	Adam Brika
15	DF	MAR	Abdellah Khafifi
16	GK	MAR	Salaheddine Chihab
17	FW	MAR	Anas El Mahraoui (on loan from Akhmat Grozny)

No.	Pos.	Nation	Player
18	FW	CGO	Christopher Ibayi
19	MF	MAR	Anas Tahiri
20	DF	TUN	Salaheddine Ghedamsi
21	DF	MAR	Marouane Ouhrou
22	DF	MAR	Hamza Ait Allal
23	FW	MAR	Youssef Hafidi
26	FW	RSA	Devin Titus
27	DF	MAR	Mohamed Jaouab
28	FW	BFA	Abdoul Kabir Ouédraogo
29	MF	MAR	El Habib Brija
30	MF	MAR	Hamza Afsal
31	MF	MAR	Mounir El Gouje
36	FW	MAR	Zakaria Allaoui
99	GK	MAR	Walid Laghrissi

== Supporters ==
The official supporter group of MAS are the Fatal Tigers. They were formed in 2006.

== Honours ==
=== National ===
- Botola Pro (5):

1964–65, 1978–79, 1982–83, 1984–85, 2025–26

- Throne Cup (4):

1980, 1988, 2011, 2016

- Botola Pro 2 (2):

1997, 2006

=== African ===
- CAF Confederation Cup (1):

2011

- CAF Super Cup (1):

2012

== Performance in CAF competitions ==
- CAF Champions League: 2 appearances

2012 – Second Round
2026–27 – TBD

- African Cup of Champions Clubs: 2 appearances

1984 – Quarter-finals
1986 – Second Round

- CAF Confederation Cup: 5 appearances

2009 – First Round
2011 – Champion
2012 – Play-off round
2014 – First Round
2017 – Play-off round

- CAF Cup Winners' Cup: 2 appearances

1990 – Second Round
2003 – First Round

- CAF Super Cup: 1 appearance

2012 – Champion

== Managers ==
- (Romania) Alexandru Moldovan (1995–96)
- (France) (Federal Republic of Yugoslavia) Ivica Todorov (1996–97)
- (Romania) Aurel Țicleanu (1997–99)
- (Morocco) Zaki Badou (July 1, 2001 – June 30, 2002)
- (Romania) Aurel Țicleanu (2002)
- (Morocco) Aziz El Amri (2002–03)
- (Romania) Aurel Țicleanu (2003–04)
- (Morocco) Jaouad Milani (2004–06)
- (Morocco) Abderrazak Khairi (2006)
- (Argentina) Oscar Fulloné (2007)
- (France) Pierre Lechantre (2007 – Jan 08)
- (France) Jean-Christian Lang (2008)
- (Senegal) Lamine N'Diaye (July 1, 2008–09)
- (Morocco) Mohamed Fakhir (2009)
- (Morocco) Abdelhadi Sektioui (2010)
- (Morocco) Rachid Taoussi (2010–12)
- (Morocco) Tarik Sektioui (2012)
- (Algeria) Azzedine Aït Djoudi (Oct 30, 2012 – June 30, 2013)
- (Morocco) Tarik Sektioui (July 1, 2013 – Oct 14, 2013)
- (Switzerland) Charly Rössli (Nov 1, 2013 – Feb 18, 2014)
- (Morocco) Abderrahim Taleb (2014)
- (France) Franck Dumas (Aug 2014–14)
- (Morocco) Rachid Taoussi (2015)
- (France) Denis Lavagne (2015– March 2016)
- (Morocco) Mohamed Al Achhabi (2016)
- (Morocco) Oussama Bouiraaman (2020)
- (France) David Boulogne(2022–?)

== Rival clubs ==
- (Morocco) Wydad Fès (Derby)
- (Morocco) COD Meknès (Derby)
- (Morocco) AS FAR (Rivalry)
- (Tunisia) ES Tunis (Rivalry)
