= Wydad de Fès =

Moroccan football club

Wydad Fez
- Full name: Wydad de Fez
- Nicknames: Black and White
- Founded: 1948; 78 years ago
- Ground: Stade Hassan II
- Capacity: 10,000
- Chairman: Hassan El Jamai
- Manager: Abderrahim Chkilit
- League: Botola Pro 2
- 2024–25: Botola Pro 2, 6th of 16
Home colours	Away colours	Third colours

Wydad Athletic de Fès is a Moroccan football club currently playing in the Botola Pro 2. The club was founded in 1948 and is located in the town of Fez.

== WAF ==
Wydad Fez is a football/sports club of the Moroccan city of Fez. This club was founded in 1948, and had for a while fallen on lean times, languishing in the shadows of Division 3 after having been one of the pillars of the national championship first division. They are the second Fez team, with the MAS Fez club having more success in recent time. They play in shirt of vertical black and white stripes.

== Stadium ==
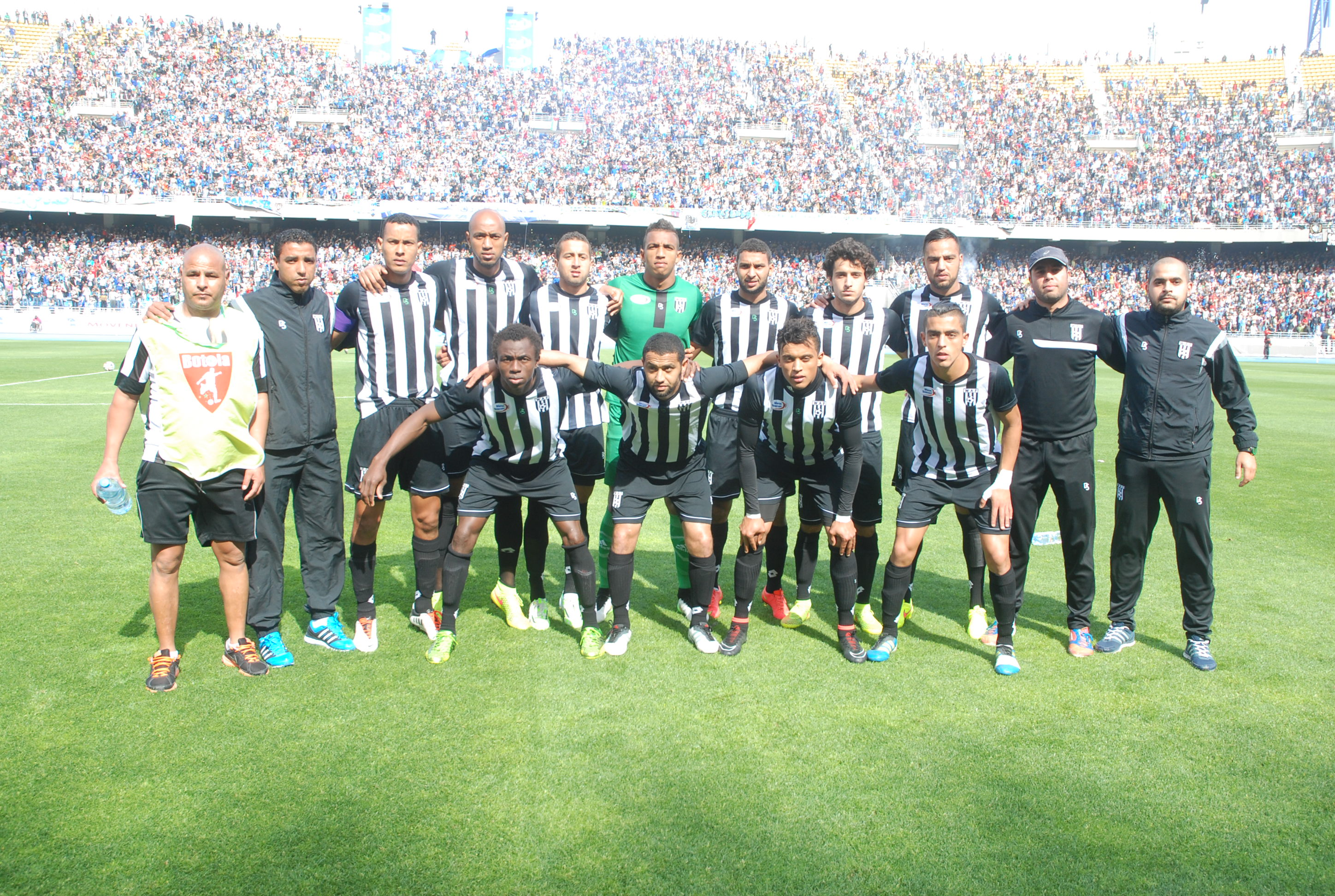
Match WAF vs IRT

Their stadium, Fez Stadium, is located in Fez, built in a typical Moroccan style. Presentation of use accompanied by technical data, Fez Stadium was able to open its doors after much debate on the financing of its facilities. Located on an area of 40 hectares, the stadium can accommodate 45,000 spectators all seated. It has a running track in addition tartan annexes likely to host high-level competitions. 15 years after first breaking ceremony to launch construction work of this complex, which required an investment of 30 million dollars, we are in front of a monument which was only dream.

== Honours ==
- Moroccan Throne Cup

- Runner-up: 2018

== Squad ==
As of 2 September 2023.

Note: Flags indicate national team as defined under FIFA eligibility rules; some limited exceptions apply. Players may hold more than one non-FIFA nationality.

No.	Pos.	Nation	Player
—	GK	MAR	Imad Akki
31	DF	MAR	Fahd Zourgane
—	DF	MAR	Mohamed Barakat
23	DF	MAR	Imad Riadi
17	DF	MAR	Ayoub El Ounhhaj (Captain)
—	RB	MAR	Mohamed Amine Merboul
2	RB	MAR	Abdou Ettayebi
—	CM	SEN	Mamadou Aly Diof
10	CM	MAR	Mohamed Hamouch
34	CM	MAR	Yasser Imrani
13	DM	MAR	Hamza Htila
—	CF	MAR	Yassine Zaraa

No.	Pos.	Nation	Player
11	CF	MAR	Mouad Gabbas
90	LW	MAR	Khalid Baba
—	CMF	MAR	Karim Farhoun
30	CMF	MAR	Soulaiman Karouk
99	CMF	MAR	Hamza Iajour
22	GK	MAR	El Mahid Agdai
—			
—			
—			
—			
—			
—			
—			
—			

== Managers ==
- (Switzerland) Charly Rössli (Oct 10, 2011 – May 21, 2012), (Nov 18, 2012 – May 10, 2013)
- (Morocco) Fathi Jamal (June 20, 2013 – Oct 11, 2013)
- (Morocco) Khalid Karama (Oct 11, 2013 – Feb 10, 2014)
- (Morocco) Fouad Sahabi (March 11, 2014–)
