= Union Mohammedia =

Moroccan football club

Union de Mohammédia
- Full name: L'Union de Mohammédia
- Founded: 1946
- League: Botola 2
- 2009–10: 3rd
Home colours	Away colours

Union de Mohammédia is a Moroccan football club currently playing in the second division. The club was founded in 1946 and is located in the town of Mohammedia. They play at El Bachir, and the president is Mohammed Benchowak. Stade Al Bachir, which has a capacity of 15,000, is their home stadium.
