= MA Tétouan =

Moroccan football club

- Full name: Moghreb Atlético Tetuán
- Nickname: The Red-Whites
- Founded: 12 March 1922; 104 years ago
- Ground: Saniat Rmel Stadium
- Capacity: 7,000
- Chairman: Mohamed Jadouni
- Manager: Barae Jrondi
- League: Botola Pro
- 2025–26: Botola Pro 2, 1st of 16 (promoted)
- Website: www.matfoot.com
Home colours	Away colours	Third colours

Moghreb Atlético Tetuán (Arabic: المغرب أتلتيكو تطوان; MAT) is a Moroccan football club based in Tétouan, it was founded on 12 March 1922. MA Tétouan is best known for its professional football team that competes in Botola Pro, the first Division of the Moroccan football league system. The club has claimed the Botola Pro D2 (second division) title a record seven times.

== History ==
=== Foundation and first years (1922–1956) ===
The founding date of the club, according to known records, particularly in several books written by Ahmed Mghara, dates back to March 1922.

During the 1920s, football in the region faced two significant challenges. The first was of a political and social nature. The Spanish Army experienced reprisals and long series of rebellions from Moroccans, mainly in the Rif region. These conflicts logically had a profound impact on the local Spanish population and consequently on football, given that many teams were composed of military personnel. The second challenge was of a sporting nature, acting as a significant hindrance to football development in Spanish Morocco. Hispano-Moroccan teams were limited to playing matches and competitions amongst themselves, without the opportunity to compete against teams from the Peninsula. For geographical, political, and economic reasons, the Spanish Football Federation refused to allow them to participate in the same competitions as mainland teams.

Meanwhile, other clubs were formed in the region and in the city of Tetuán, including Español F.C, primarily composed of Spaniards and a prominent club in the city, and Moghreb F.C, composed of Moroccan players. In 1932, a group of supporters of Atletico de Madrid attempted to unite several local club leaders with the goal of creating a powerful club capable of competing with Spanish clubs. Athletic Club de Tetuán was officially founded on March 12, 1933, and notably recruited the best players from F.C. Hispano-Marroquí and Sporting Club Tetuán, who had already been part of the initial venture. With a new logo inspired by Athletic Bilbao and kits inspired by Atlético Madrid.

The club debuted in the 1933–34 season, participating in the local second division. Despite mediocre results, the club managed to advance to the first division through a complete restructuring of the championship, coming from Ceuta and Melilla, Spanish enclaves in Morocco. A local rivalry emerged with Español F.C., dividing the city. With superior finances compared to other local teams, the club even recruited players from Spain, just three years after its creation. However, by the late 1930s, while the region was relatively pacified, the economy became increasingly unstable. The Spanish Civil War that erupted in 1936 also caused mass departures of expatriate military personnel returning to their home country to fight on the front lines. Athletic Club de Tetuán found itself in a precarious situation and more or less disappeared.

In 1941, the club returned and became Club Atlético de Tetuán following a decree requiring teams to have Spanish names. In Spanish territory, Athletic Club, founded by the English, for example, had become Club Atlético de Bilbao, with the club being on the verge of moving up to the second Spanish division, a complete restructuring of Spanish football finally allowed Club Atlético de Tetuán to compete with Iberian teams, and it now played in the third Spanish division.

This promotion was economically interesting, but on the field, the team struggled significantly. It was relegated at the end of its second season in the third tier of Spanish football, despite having the opportunity to compete in a playoff to avoid relegation and take the place of another team that had declared forfeit. Back in Spanish Morocco, the club easily won the championship in 1945–46, secured access through the playoffs to the Spanish third division, and made a comeback after only one year. This time, the results were much more positive. Under the leadership of President Julio Parrés López and with the arrival of numerous Spanish players and Andalusian coach Santiago Núñez, the club earned the opportunity to participate in the promotion playoffs to the second division. After doing the job, the club could finally experience the second Spanish division. This time, there would be no trembling. The club finished at a respectable 5th position, just a few points away from promotion to the first division. Recognized for its youth development policy, the club primarily tapped into the local talent pool in Spanish Morocco, recruiting the best young players from local teams. At the same time, it had forged a relationship with its former rival, Español C.F, which served as a subsidiary and had just earned promotion to the Spanish third division. Espano-Moroccan football was thriving.

=== After independence (Since 1956) ===
After the Independence of Morocco, the club had a new committee and found themselves in the northern group in the play-offs to join the elite of the Moroccan league. Since then, the club has played 14 top-flight seasons and 34 in the 2nd division. The Moghreb Athletic of Tetouan won the Moroccan championship for the first time in its history, (which is for the first time a professional championship). This title was won at the end of the last day on the ground of his runner-up on FUS Rabat (Fath), on 28 May 2012. It was a historic moment for the club which not only won the title but also experienced the largest displacement of supporters (over 45,000 people) in the history of Moroccan football.

Sunday May 25, 2014 will go down in history. The club won its second championship against Raja de Casablanca. During the 29th matchday, the two teams were tied (55 points) except that Raja, were leader of the standings. Raja was beaten by the OCS (Olympique de Safi) in Safi by 1 goal to zero while Moghreb from Tetouan, beat the rebirth of Berkane in Tetouan by 2 goals to 1. This consecration allows him to participate for the first time in its history at the world club championship which was organized in Morocco in December 2014.

In 2nd division, the club won the championship 5 times from 1965 to 2005. They were the runner up for the throne cup in 2020 against AS FAR while also reaching the semi-final twice in 2008 against MAS de Fès and against berkane in 2025 and quarter-finalist twice in 1965 against the Moroccan stadium and in 1981 against the future finalist the CODM de Meknes.

=== Resurgence in the Moroccan pyramid (2011–2014) ===
Tetouan really began to move up the footballing pyramid in July 2011, though, when little known coach Aziz El Amri was appointed. His mission was to save the team from relegation, but he took them to their first ever championship title in 2012—a feat even more remarkable when one takes into account that some of the senior players went on strike over unpaid wages, and Tetouan were forced to use inexperienced home grown youngsters instead. On the final day, they needed just a draw at FUS Rabat and won 1–0 to seal the trophy. Around 30,000 fans travelled with the team—the largest away crowd in Moroccan football history—marking the club's first league title and the first season of the professional Moroccan league.

In context, 2012–13 was relatively mediocre as the team lost some of its key players who left the club as they only managed to finish 5th. But in the following season Tetouan were back in the title race again, knowing that winning would secure a place in the 2014 Club World Cup. It was not to be. First, Moghreb Tetouan were thrashed 5–0 by Raja Casablanca in the big game on the penultimate day of the season, seemingly losing the crown. On 25 May, Raja Casablanca lost to Olympic Safi on the final day, and Tetouan claimed the championship title. Moghreb Tetouan competed in the 2014 FIFA Club World Cup, marking its first appearance in the tournament. it fell short in its opening match against Auckland City, causing it to be knocked out in the Play-off for quarter-finals.

=== Sergio Lobera and African success (2015–16) ===
On December 24, 2014 Sergio Lobera was appointed as the new Moghreb Atletico Tetouan head coach and successor of El Amri. The team managed to pull off a historic African Champions League campaign, qualifying for the group stage for the first time ever. Despite its debut in the competition, the club fell short in the group stage, forcing it to have an early exit from the competition.

=== Period of decline (2016–present) ===
From 2016 to 2023, Moghreb Atlético Tetuán experienced a significant decline, marked by financial instability, management issues, and poor on-field performance. Despite a successful period in the early 2010s, including league titles in 2012 and 2014, the club struggled to maintain its competitive edge in subsequent years after the resignation of President Abdelmalek Abroun and the election of Redouane El Ghazi as new President by the club members in 2018.

Financial problems plagued MAT, leading to unpaid wages and the departure of key players. The instability was exacerbated by frequent changes in the coaching staff, which hindered the development of a consistent team strategy. As a result, the team's performance deteriorated, culminating in their relegation to the Botola Pro 2 in the 2020-2021 season, although the team was promoted to the top tier of Moroccan football the next year. Efforts to stabilize the club included new management after the resignation of President El Ghazi in 2023 and the election of an 'interim board of directors', but the journey to reclaim their former glory remained challenging.

== Colors and symbols ==
=== Red and white kit ===
Traditionally the home kit features the iconic red and white stripe design accompanied by blue shorts and red socks, this combination has been used since 1947 and is still in use today, although sometimes blue socks are used instead. What is worth mentioning is that the club wore black socks instead at first (1922–1947). The club of course got its colours from its Spanish twin club Atlético Madrid. The away kit colours generally differs from one season to another but is usually black with white and red applications.

The kit has been made by many brands like Nike, Le Coq Sportif, among others. As of the 2024/2025 season, the kit sponsor will be Italian sportswear brand Kappa. The current main shirt sponsor is Tanger-Med, the company that runs the biggest industrial seaport in the Mediterranean, while Cafés Carrion, inwi and Radio Mars all have minor sponsorship on the shirt.

== Home ground ==
Whilst it is almost certain that football was played on the site of the Estadio de Varela from the turn of the 20th century, the land was not formally enclosed until 1913. Situated on the north bank of the River Martil, the stadium played host to a variety of sports thanks to the inclusion of a cinder athletics track. Rudimentary bleachers were added once Atlético started to play in Campeonato Hispano-Marroquí, whilst officials could watch from a rather ornate raised, open terrace. This wedge shaped construction was double sided, so that one could view races at the hippodrome that stood to the west of the stadium. Atlético's ascent to La Primera led to the stadium undergoing major redevelopment. An open stand with bench terracing was erected on the east side which was linked to semi circular end terraces. Club office and changing rooms were built in the south west corner and the pitch was access via a tunnel behind the southern goal. The stadium's main tribuna was built on the west side, and this featured a vaulted concrete cantilevered roof. However, it was only 75 metres in length and ran from the southern touchline, before seemingly losing interest and petering out just after the halfway line. With a capacity of 15,000, Varela suited Atlético just fine, and it also seemed to suit Moghreb Tétouan just fine, as little was done to the stadium for the next 50 years.

In the intervening years, the stadium was renamed the Stade Saniat Rmel and in 2007, the parched turf was replaced with an artificial surface. Work on the original terraces saw the capacity reduced to 10,000, but then in 2011, to mark the 60th anniversary of the original club's promotion to La Primera, the main tribuna underwent a major refurbishment. A new framework was erected at the rear of the stand to support the original, ageing concrete roof. Everything was given a coat of red, white & blue paint and new bucket seats were bolted to the concrete steps. After 50 years of achieving very little, Moghreb Tétouan won its first Moroccan championship in May 2012. As the city celebrated the club's first major honour, the Ultras paraded banners celebrating the club's Spanish heritage, saying "Siempre Los Matadores" (Matadors Forever).

The club's president has stated many times before that a new bigger stadium was under way, as thanks to the club's success in recent years more supporters started attending matches and the current stadium's capacity was not enough. In 2015 the construction on the new stadium officially started, the club's president Abdelmalek Abroun has stated that the new stadium will be a part of the new sports city and will have a capacity of about 40,000 seats. However, as of 2023, the construction of the stadium has halted in its initial stages due delays, permit issues, and funding.

== Affiliated clubs ==
- Atlético Madrid
- Granada CF

== Club rivalries ==
=== The Northern Derby ===
- IR Tanger, the club of the neighbouring city, Tangier, is considered the club's biggest rival, their encounter, referred to as the northern derby, is a significant fixture in the Moroccan league.

== Supporters ==
Moghreb Atlético Tetuán has 2 "ultras" fan groups, Los Matadores since 2005 and Siempre Paloma since 2006, both are based in Tetouan and even though they had many conflicts over the years they managed to unite and are now in good terms as they sit next to each other and work united and cooperatively as Fondo Norte.

The club's supporters they are also known for their unique chants mixing Arabic and Spanish, in 2012 they broke the record of the largest away crowd in Moroccan football history when more than 30.000 fans travelled with the team to Rabat to face FUS Rabat on the last day of the Moroccan championship, a match they won to earn their first Moroccan championship title.

Again on the opening day of the 2014 FIFA Club World Cup, Moghreb Atlético Tetuán was facing Auckland City FC in the preliminary round, a record breaking away crowd of more than 40,000 fans attended the match.

== Current Squad ==
As of 14 January, 2025

Note: Flags indicate national team as defined under FIFA eligibility rules; some limited exceptions apply. Players may hold more than one non-FIFA nationality.

No.	Pos.	Nation	Player
1	GK	MAR	Mehdi El Jourbaoui
3	DF	MAR	Abdelilah Madkour
5	MF	MAR	Mohammed El Fakih
6	MF	NED	Ouail el Merabet
7	MF	MAR	El Mehdi El Khamlichi
9	FW	MAR	Hamza Darai
10	MF	MAR	Zaid Krouch (captain)
11	FW	MAR	Bilal El Megri
13	GK	MAR	Yahia El Filali
14	MF	MAR	Diae-Eddine Eddaoudi
17	DF	MAR	Yassine Amhih
21	MF	MAR	Zaid Ben Khajjou
23	FW	GHA	Abraham Wayo
24	DF	MAR	Ayoub Chabboud
26	MF	MAR	Imad Errahouli

No.	Pos.	Nation	Player
27	DF	MLI	Ismaïla Simpara
31	FW	MAR	Mohamed Kamal
33	DF	MAR	Mohamed Dades
44	MF	MAR	Mouad Karmoun
64	DF	MAR	Houssam Ben Youssef
66	DF	MAR	Yassine Karraz
74	MF	MAR	Roshdi Wahabi
77	FW	MAR	Youssef El Houari
90	FW	MAR	Ayoub Lakhal
93	DF	MAR	Akram Mejdoub
95	DF	MAR	Yassine El Ghazouani
96	DF	MAR	Mohamed Rahim
97	DF	MAR	Mohamed Cheikhi
98	MF	MAR	Salaheddine Ben Merzouka

== Managers ==
=== Spanish Era (1922–1956) ===
- (Spain) Carlos Iturraspe (1953)
- (Spain) Baltasar Albéniz (1953–1954)
- (Spain) Antonio Barrios (1954–1955)

=== Moroccan Era (Post–1956) ===
- (Morocco) Mohamed Fakhir (Dec 2007 – Jun 2008)
- (Morocco) Abderrahim Talib (2008 – 2009)
- (Morocco) Mohamed Fakhir (Jan – May 2010)
- (France) Jean-François Jodar (May – Dec 2010)
- (Morocco) Aziz El Amri (Dec 2010 – Dec 2014)
- (Spain) Sergio Lobera (Dec 2014 – May 2017)
- (Morocco) Amin Erbati (May 2017)
- (Morocco) Fouad Sahabi (Jun – Sep 2017)
- (Algeria) Abdelhak Benchikha (Sep – Nov 2017)
- (Morocco) Youssef Fertout (Nov 2017 – Feb 2018)
- (Morocco) Abdelouahid Benhssain (Feb 2018 – Feb 2019)
- (Morocco) Tarik Sektioui (Feb – Jul 2019)
- (Spain) Ángel Viadero (Aug 2019 – Feb 2020)
- (Morocco) Jamaleddine Drideb (Feb – Sep 2020)
- (Serbia) Zoran Manojlović (Sep – Oct 2020)
- (Spain) Juanjo Maqueda (Oct – Dec 2020)
- (Morocco) Jamaleddine Drideb (Dec 2020 – Jan 2021)
- (Morocco) Younes Ben Lahmar (Jan – Feb 2021)
- (Morocco) Jamaleddine Drideb (Feb – Jul 2021)
- (Spain) Toni Cosano (Jul – Sep 2021)
- (Morocco) Abdellatif Jrindou (Sep 2021 – Dec 2022)
- (Morocco) Reda Hakam (Dec 2022 – Feb 2023)
- (Morocco) Jamaleddine Drideb (Feb – Mar 2023)
- (Morocco) Hicham Louissi (Mar 2023 – Jul 2023)
- (Morocco) Mohammed Alaoui Ismaili (Jul 2023 – Feb 2024)
- (Morocco) Abdellatif Jrindou (Feb - Jul 2024)
- (Croatia) Dalibor Starcevic (Aug - Oct 2024)
- (Morocco) Aziz El Amri (Oct -)

== Honours ==
=== Domestic ===
- Botola Pro
  - Champions (2): 2011–12, 2013–14
- Botola Pro 2
  - Champions (7): 1957–58, 1969–70, 1989–90, 1994–95, 2004–05, 2021–22, 2025–26
- Moroccan Throne Cup
  - Runners-up (1): 2019–20

=== Friendly ===
- Ramón de Carranza Trophy
  - Runners-up (1): 2013

== Bibliography ==
- Tetuán y su Atlético by Julio Parres Aragonés (L'Hospitalet: el author, 1997).

== See also ==
- Atlético Madrid
- Atlético San Luis
- Atlético Ottawa
- Athletic Bilbao
- Atlético Tetuán
- AD Ceuta FC
- IR Tanger
- Atlético Junior
