= Olympic Club Safi =

Moroccan professional football club

- Full name: Olympic Club Safi
- Nickname: • Hadirat Al-Muhit (حاضرة المحيط) • The Sharks (القروش) • La Perle Historique
- Founded: 6 September 1921; 104 years ago
- Ground: El Massira Stadium
- Capacity: 20,000
- Chairman: Mohamed hidaoui
- Manager: Mohamed Alaoui Ismaili
- League: Botola Pro 2
- 2025–26: Botola Pro, 16th of 16 (relegated)
Home colours	Away colours	Third colours

Olympic Club Safi (Arabic: نادي أولمبيك آسفي) usually referred to as OCS, is a Moroccan professional football club based in Safi, Morocco, The club competes in the Botola Pro 2, the second tier of Moroccan football.

Founded in 1921, in the name of Union Sportive de Safi until 1977, when it got changed again to Wydad athletic de Safi before having its current name, Olympique Club de Safi in 1988.

== History ==
Olympic Club de Safi, founded in 1921, is one of Morocco's oldest football clubs. Based in the coastal city of Safi, the team has spent much of its history in the lower divisions before rising to prominence in the early 2000s. The club earned promotion to the Botola Pro (Moroccan top division) in the 2003–04 season and has remained a steady presence since. Their home ground is Stade El Massira, which holds around 15,000 fans. Backed by the OCP Group since 1986, OCS reached notable success with a Throne Cup final appearance in 2016 and regular top-half finishes in recent Botola seasons. The club is also known for its passionate supporters and investment in youth development through a dedicated football academy.

On 22 June 2025, Olympic Club de Safi made history by qualifying for the CAF Confederation Cup for the first time, set to begin in the 2025–26 season, after reaching the final of the 2024–25 Moroccan Throne Cup by defeating Union de Touarga in the semi-final. Their qualification was secured after RS Berkane defeated Maghreb Tetouan in the other semi-final, as Berkane had already qualified for the CAF Champions League, thereby granting the Confederation Cup berth to Olympic Safi. On 29 June 2025, Olympic Club de Safi crowned their campaign by winning the final, claiming the Moroccan Throne Cup for the first time in their history.

== Current squad ==
As of 6 April, 2026

Note: Flags indicate national team as defined under FIFA eligibility rules; some limited exceptions apply. Players may hold more than one non-FIFA nationality.

No.	Pos.	Nation	Player
1	GK	MAR	Abderrahmane Kernane
2	DF	MAR	Anas Soufeir
3	DF	MAR	Walid Atik (on loan from Wydad)
4	DF	CGO	Fred Ngoma
5	MF	MAR	Salaheddine Errahouli
6	MF	FRA	Sofian El Moudane
7	FW	MAR	Anas Samoudi
8	MF	MAR	Faraji Karmoune
11	FW	MAR	Marwane Elaz
12	GK	MAR	Hamza Hamiani
13	DF	ALG	Houari Ferhani
14	FW	SEN	Moussa Koné
15	DF	MAR	Yassine Kordani
16	MF	MAR	Oussama Ichou

No.	Pos.	Nation	Player
17	DF	MAR	Ayman Hadry
18	FW	MAR	Imad Khannouss
19	FW	MAR	Younes Najari
21	MF	FRA	Mohamed Chemlal
22	FW	MAR	Anass Eddaou
24	DF	MAR	Yasser Ezzine
25	GK	MAR	Youssef El Motie
26	GK	MAR	Imad Askar
27	FW	MAR	Saad El Morsli
28	FW	TUN	Achref Habbassi (on loan from AS FAR)
29	MF	MAR	Soulaimane El Bouchqali (on loan from AS FAR)
31	DF	MAR	Hamza Semmoumy
32	DF	MAR	Imad Serbout
-	MF	MAR	Ayman Ouhatti

== Managers ==
- (Switzerland) Alain Geiger (April 27, 2007 – Dec 3, 2007)
- (Morocco) Youssef Lemrini (Jan 10, 2013 – June 20, 2013)
- (Morocco) Badou Zaki (July 1, 2013 – Dec 17, 2013)
- (Morocco) Youssef Fertout (Dec 24, 2013 – June 19, 2014)
- (Morocco) Hicham El Idrissi (June 21, 2014– Mars 10 2014)
- (Morocco) Youssef Fertout (Mars 10, 2013 – August 29, 2014)
- (Morocco) Aziz El Amri (August 29, 2014 – April 20, 2016)
- (Morocco) Hicham Dmii (April 20, 2016 – August 15, 2020)
- (Morocco) Mohamed AlKaysser (April 20, 2016 – August 15, 2020)
- (Morocco) Abdelhadi Sektioui (March 8, 2020 – unknown)
- (Morocco) Amine El Karma (January 20, 2021 – May 5, 2021)'
- (Morocco) Saïd Chiba (May 11, 2021 – July 1, 2021)'
- (Morocco) Faouzi Jamal (July 7, 2021 –

== Honours ==
Throne Cup

- Champions (1): 2023–24
- Runner-up (1): 2015–16

Moroccan Old Morocco Cup

- Champions (1): 1949-50
- Runner-up (1): 1950-51

CAF Confederation Cup

- Semi-finalist : 2025-26

Botola Pro 2

- Champions (2): 1934–35, 2003–04
- Runner-up (2): 1948–49, 1956–57
