= Kénitra AC =

Moroccan sports club

Kenitra AC
- Full name: Kenitra Athletic Club
- Nicknames: Les Verts, Sebou Knights
- Founded: 1938; 88 years ago
- Ground: Kenitra Municipal Stadium
- Capacity: 28,000
- Chairman: Alaoui wislani
- League: Botola Pro 2
- 2025–26: Botola Pro 2, 13th of 16
- Website: https://kac.football/
| Home colours | Away colours | Third colours |

Kenitra Athletic Club (Arabic: النادي القنيطري) is a Moroccan football club based in the city of Kenitra.

== History ==
One of the oldest and most prestigious football teams in Morocco is Kenitra Athletic Club (KAC), which was established in 1938. The club, which is based in Kenitra in the northwest, has a long history that began before Morocco gained its independence in 1956, but gained national recognition after independence year.

The early 1960s marked the start of KAC's most prosperous era, as the team rose to prominence in Moroccan football. The team's disciplined tactical play and well-organized roster helped them win their first Botola Pro (Moroccan League) championship in the 1959–60 season. Their first-ever Moroccan Throne Cup victory came in 1961, a historic milestone for the club in domestic cup competitions.

They won their second league championship in 1972–73, a season characterized by defense and consistency. The 1980–81 season saw KAC win their third league title following a close game in which they defeated other title challengers. Kenitra Athletic Club won their fourth and final Moroccan league title in 1982, marking the end of their golden era in top-flight football.

The club also claimed the Botola Pro D2 (second division) championship twice, in 1976, 2002, showcasing their resilience and ability to bounce back after series of relegations.

The team maintained its competitiveness in the topflight during the 1980s and the first part of the 1990s. However, KAC's success gradually declined as Moroccan football became increasingly professionalized. The squad spent numerous seasons in the second level after being relegated several times.

== Honours ==
- Moroccan First League
  - Champions: 1960, 1973, 1981, 1982
  - Runners-up: 1979, 1985
- Moroccan League Second Division
  - Champions: 1976, 2002
  - Runners-up: 2007
- Coupe du Trône
  - Champions: 1961
  - Runners-up: 1969, 1976, 1991

== Current squad ==
Note: Flags indicate national team as defined under FIFA eligibility rules; some limited exceptions apply. Players may hold more than one non-FIFA nationality.

| No. | Pos. | Nation | Player |
|---|---|---|---|
| 1 | GK | MAR | Alaa Meskini |
| 2 | DF | MAR | Souhail Minaoui |
| 3 | DF | MAR | Youssef Tourabi |
| 29 | DF | MAR | Iyad ElBaz |
| 5 | MF | MAR | Rachid Berrouas |
| 6 | DF | MAR | Samir Zekroumi |
| 7 | MF | MAR | Mohammed Chihani |
| 8 | MF | MAR | Ayoub Zehaf |
| 9 | FW | MAR | Hamza Ghatas |
| 13 | MF | MAR | Marouane Eddaraaoui |

| No. | Pos. | Nation | Player |
|---|---|---|---|
| 14 | DF | MAR | Naofalis Bourkis |
| 15 | DF | MAR | Hassan Haidouri |
| 17 | MF | MAR | Ayoub Gaâdaoui |
| 18 | FW | SEN | Dieylani Fall |
| 19 | FW | MAR | Hamza Farhoun |
| 27 | MF | MAR | Fahd Kardoud |
| 29 | MF | MAR | Issam El Farssi |
| 30 | GK | MAR | Ali Grouni |
| 36 | DF | COD | Fafa Faril Rozan |
| 99 | DF | MAR | Mohamed Chibi |

== Sport equipment ==
- Sarson Sports

== Managers ==
- (Morocco) Mounir Jaouani
- (Morocco) A. Kedmirri
- (Morocco) A. Loukhmirri
- (Morocco) Ahmed Souiri
- (Spain) F. Vegas
- (Morocco) M. El Ammari
- (Morocco) Boujemaâ Benkhrif
- (Germany) O. Ladislav
- (Netherlands) A. Zalai
- (Morocco) B. El Ghalemi
- (Romania) Mircea Dridea
- (Brazil) A. Greco
- (Brazil) P. Mendez
- (Algeria) Y. Kadda
- (Morocco) Mohamed Boussati
- (Morocco) M. Bouâbid
- (Morocco) M. Rhiad
- (Morocco) M. Belhassan
- (Switzerland) Robert Muller
- (Romania) Virgil Popescu
- (Algeria) Nedjm Eddine Belayachi
- (Croatia) Zoran Vujović (2007–08)
- (Morocco) J. Chadli
- (Morocco) M. Baltham
- (Morocco) Rachid Taoussi
- (Morocco) F. Sahabi
- (Morocco) Jamal Jebrane
- (Argentina) Oscar Fulloné (2009–10)
- (Morocco) Abdelkhalek Louzani
- (Morocco) Abdelaziz Kerkach
- (Morocco) Youssef Lamrini
- (Morocco) Abdelkader Youmir (Nov 14, 2012 – Jan 1, 2013)
- (Croatia) Zoran Vujović (Jan 3, 2013 – April 29, 2013)
- (Morocco) Abdelkhalek Louzani

== Presidents (since 1938) ==
- (Morocco) Seddik M'kinsi
- (Morocco) Abdelkader Sbai (Tanto)
- (Morocco) Ahmed Souiri
- (Morocco) Abderahmmane M'kinsi
- (Morocco) Mohammed Temsamani
- (Morocco) Moulay Ahmed Ouadghiri
- (Morocco) Mohammed Benjelloun
- (Morocco) Ahmed Benkirane
- (Morocco) Mohammed Bouaazaoui
- (Morocco) Haitouf Elghazi
- (Morocco) Mohammed Doumou (1975–00)
- (Morocco) Mohammed El Harrati
- (Morocco) Mohammed Al Moutawakkil
- (Morocco) Houcine Benmoussa
- (Morocco) Khalil Sebbar
- (Morocco) Benaissa Akrouch
- (Morocco) Hakim Doumou (2006–11)
- (Morocco) Mohammed Chibar (2011–)
- (Morocco) Badr Hari (2014–)
