= 2024–25 Wydad AC season =

Wydad AC
2024–25 season
- President: Hicham Ait Menna
- Head coach: Rhulani Mokwena (until 29 April 2025); Mohamed Amine Benhachem (interim from 29 April to 12 May, permanent from 24 May)
- Stadium: Larbi Zaouli Stadium (until 28 March 2025); Stade Mohammed V (from 12 April 2025)
- Botola: 3rd
- Throne Cup: Round of 16
- Excellence Cup: Group stage
- FIFA Club World Cup: Group stage
- Top goalscorer: League: Mohamed Rayhi (11 goals); All: Mohamed Rayhi (11 goals)
- Average home league attendance: 23,880
- Biggest win: 5–0 vs JS Massira (Away, Excellence Cup)
- Biggest defeat: 1–4 vs Maghreb of Fez (Home, Botola); 1–4 vs Juventus FC (Neutral, FIFA Club World Cup)
Home colours	Away colours	Third colours

The 2024–25 season was Wydad Athletic Club's 88th season in existence, their 85th football season and the club's 69th consecutive season in the top flight of Moroccan football. Wydad participated in this season's edition of the Botola, the Throne Cup, the Moroccan Excellence Cup and the expanded FIFA Club World Cup.

Wydad AC did not participate in any African competition for the first time since the 2014–15 season. They finished in third place in the league and qualified for the CAF Confederation Cup for the first time since the 2012–13 season.

== Season events ==
=== April ===
After a string of 6 winless games, on 29 April 2025, the club announced that head coach Rhulani Mokwena, had been granted "exceptional leave" until the end of the season, and would leave immediately after the final game of the league. As a result, Sporting Director Mohamed Amine Benhachem took charge of the first team for the remainder of the campaign.

=== May ===
On 20 May 2025, in a joint statement, the club and Rhulani Mokwena confirmed the termination of his contract.

Four days later, Mohamed Amine Benhachem was appointed as the new head coach.

== Technical staff ==
As of 31 May 2025.

Position	Name
Coaching staff
Head coach	(Morocco) Mohamed Amine Benhachem
Assistant coaches	(Morocco) Abdessamad Ouarrad (Morocco) Brahim Nekkach
Goalkeepers coach	(Morocco) Zouhair Laaroubi
Data analyst	(Morocco) Agdal Tarek
Tactical analyst	(Senegal) Elhadji Abdoulaye Seck
Set-piece coach	(Morocco) Fouad Taalat
Physical trainer	(Morocco) Idriss Saissi Hassani
Front office
Technical manager	(Morocco) Hassan Benabicha

== Squad information ==
As of 31 May 2025.

Note: Flags indicate national team as defined under FIFA eligibility rules; some limited exceptions apply. Players may hold more than one non-FIFA nationality.

No.	Pos.	Player	Nat.	Date of birth (Age)	Signed in	Notes
Goalkeepers
1	GK	Youssef El Motie	(Morocco)	16 December 1994 (aged 30)	2022	—
12	GK	Mehdi Benabid	(Morocco)	24 January 1998 (aged 27)	2025	—
36	GK	Omar Aqzdaou	(Morocco)	16 March 2003 (aged 22)	2025	Youth system
Defenders
2	DF	Mouhamed Moufid	(Morocco)	12 January 2000 (aged 25)	2024	—
3	DF	Zakaria Nassik	(Morocco)	1 January 1997 (aged 28)	2024	—
13	DF	Ayman Dairani	(Morocco)	1 January 1996 (aged 29)	2024	—
14	DF	Abdelmounaim Boutouil	(Morocco)	9 January 1998 (aged 27)	2024	—
15	DF	Mohammed El Jadidi	(Morocco)	20 July 2004 (aged 20)	2025	—
16	DF	Jamal Harkass (captain)	(Morocco)	24 November 1995 (aged 29)	2023	—
18	DF	Fahd Moufi	(Morocco)	5 May 1996 (aged 29)	2025	—
22	DF	Bart Meijers	(Netherlands)	10 January 1997 (aged 28)	2025	—
24	DF	Ayoub Bouchta	(Morocco)	3 December 1993 (aged 31)	2024	—
72	DF	Guilherme Ferreira	(Brazil)	2 December 1999 (aged 25)	2025	—
	DF	Ayman Dairani	(Morocco)	1 January 1996 (aged 29)	2024	—
Midfielders
4	MF	Thembinkosi Lorch	(South Africa)	22 July 1993 (aged 31)	2025	on loan from Mamelodi Sundowns
5	MF	Ismail Moutaraji	(Morocco)	1 February 2000 (aged 25)	2022	—
7	MF	Mickaël Malsa	(Martinique)	12 October 1995 (aged 29)	2025	—
10	MF	Arthur	(Brazil)	24 February 2005 (aged 20)	2024	—
19	MF	El Mehdi El Moubarik	(Morocco)	22 January 2001 (aged 24)	2024	on loan from Al Ain
20	MF	Mouad Aounzou	(Morocco)	21 May 2001 (aged 24)	2024	—
23	MF	Oussama Zemraoui	(Morocco)	1 March 2001 (aged 24)	2024	—
25	MF	Stephane Aziz Ki	(Burkina Faso)	6 March 1996 (aged 29)	2025	—
27	MF	Ismael Benktib	(Morocco)	4 July 1998 (aged 26)	2024	—
33	MF	Pedrinho	(Brazil)	1 January 2004 (aged 21)	2024	—
34	MF	Yassine Bennani	(Morocco)	17 July 2008 (aged 16)	2025	Youth system
44	MF	Rayane Mahtou	(Morocco)	1 February 2004 (aged 21)	2025	Youth system
	MF	Hamza Sakhi	(Morocco)	7 June 1996 (aged 29)	2024	—
Forwards
6	FW	Mounir El Habach	(Morocco)	1 May 2000 (aged 25)	2023	—
8	FW	Mohamed Rayhi	(Netherlands)	1 July 1994 (aged 30)	2024	—
9	FW	Samuel Obeng	(Ghana)	15 May 1997 (aged 28)	2025	—
11	FW	Nordin Amrabat	(Morocco)	31 March 1987 (aged 38)	2025	—
17	FW	Zakaria Fathi	(Morocco)	14 August 1998 (aged 26)	2025	—
21	FW	Cassius Mailula	(South Africa)	12 June 2001 (aged 24)	2024	on loan from Toronto FC
26	FW	Selemani Mwalimu	(Tanzania)	19 January 2006 (aged 19)	2025	^{U21}
29	FW	Hamza Hannouri	(Morocco)	22 January 1998 (aged 27)	2025	—
30	FW	Saifeddine Bouhra	(Morocco)	5 March 2000 (aged 25)	2023	—
99	FW	Omar Al Somah	(Syria)	23 March 1989 (aged 36)	2025	Eligible for the 2025 FIFA Club World Cup only
	FW	Walid Nassi	(France)	15 July 2000 (aged 24)	2024	—

== Transfers ==
=== In ===
Date	Position	Nationality	Name	From	Fee	Ref.
1 July 2024	MF	(Morocco)	Ismail Moutaraji	(United Arab Emirates) Al Dhafra FC	Loan return	
24 July 2024	DF	(Morocco)	Mouhamed Moufid	–	Free transfer	
24 July 2024	FW	(Netherlands)	Mohamed Rayhi	(Saudi Arabia) Al-Jabalain FC	Undisclosed	
24 July 2024	GK	(Morocco)	Abdelali Mhamdi	–	Free transfer	
26 July 2024	DF	(Morocco)	Ayman Dairani	Union de Touarga	Undisclosed	
27 July 2024	DF	(Morocco)	Nabil Marmouk	–	Free transfer	
27 July 2024	MF	(Morocco)	Hamza Sakhi	–	Free transfer	
4 August 2024	DF	(Morocco)	Zakaria Nassik	–	Free transfer	
22 August 2024	MF	(Brazil)	Pedrinho	(Brazil) Corinthians	Undisclosed	
23 August 2024	FW	(Morocco)	Nassim Chadli	(France) Le Havre AC	Undisclosed	
25 August 2024	FW	(Morocco)	Zacarías Ghailán	–	Free transfer	
26 August 2024	FW	(France)	Walid Nassi	(France) Dijon FCO	Undisclosed	
29 August 2024	MF	(Morocco)	Ismael Benktib	–	Free transfer	
5 September 2024	DF	(Morocco)	Abdelmounaim Boutouil	–	Free transfer	
8 September 2024	FW	(Senegal)	M'Baye Niang	(Italy) Empoli FC	Free transfer	
20 September 2024	MF	(Brazil)	Arthur	(Brazil) Fluminense FC	Undisclosed	
19 January 2025	DF	(Morocco)	Fahd Moufi	–	Free transfer	
29 January 2025	MF	(Martinique)	Mickaël Malsa	–	Free transfer	
30 January 2025	FW	(Morocco)	Zakaria Fathi	SCC Mohammédia	Undisclosed	
30 January 2025	DF	(Morocco)	Mohammed El Jadidi	SCC Mohammédia	Undisclosed	
30 January 2025	GK	(Morocco)	Mehdi Benabid	AS FAR	Undisclosed	
6 February 2025	FW	(Tanzania)	Selemani Mwalimu	–	Free transfer	
7 February 2025	FW	(Ghana)	Samuel Obeng	–	Free transfer	
24 May 2025	FW	(Morocco)	Nordin Amrabat	–	Free transfer	
24 May 2025	FW	(Morocco)	Hamza Hannouri	–	Free transfer	
24 May 2025	FW	(Burkina Faso)	Stephane Aziz Ki	(Tanzania) Young Africans	Undisclosed	
5 June 2025	DF	(Netherlands)	Bart Meijers	(Bosnia and Herzegovina) Borac Banja Luka	Undisclosed	
14 June 2025	DF	(Brazil)	Guilherme Ferreira	(Portugal) Felgueiras	Undisclosed	
20 June 2025	FW	(Syria)	Omar Al Somah	(Saudi Arabia) Al-Orobah	Free transfer (Note: Eligible for the 2025 FIFA Club World Cup only.)	

=== Loans in ===
Date from	Position	Nationality	Name	From	Date to	Ref.
21 August 2024	FW	(South Africa)	Cassius Mailula	(United States) Toronto FC	30 June 2025	
20 September 2024	FW	(Brazil)	Renan Viana	(Brazil) Club Athletico Paranaense	30 June 2025	
23 September 2024	MF	(Morocco)	El Mehdi El Moubarik	(United Arab Emirates) Al Ain FC	30 June 2025	
3 February 2025	MF	(South Africa)	Thembinkosi Lorch	(South Africa) Mamelodi Sundowns	30 June 2025	

=== Out ===
Date	Position	Nationality	Name	To	Fee	Ref.
16 June 2024	FW	(Morocco)	Mohamed Ounajem	–	End of contract	
18 June 2024	FW	(Morocco)	Ismail El Haddad	–	End of contract	
27 June 2024	DF	(Democratic Republic of the Congo)	Arsène Zola	Kuwait SC	Undisclosed	
1 July 2024	FW	(Morocco)	Montasser Lahtimi	(Turkey) Trabzonspor	End of loan	
1 July 2024	FW	(Nigeria)	Ade Oguns	(Venezuela) Caracas F.C.	End of loan	
4 July 2024	MF	(Morocco)	Anas Serrhat	–	End of contract	
4 July 2024	FW	(Morocco)	Imad Khannouss	–	End of contract	
12 July 2024	MF	(Morocco)	Yahya Jabrane	Kuwait SC	Free transfer	
23July 2024	DF	(Morocco)	Ayoub El Amloud	–	End of contract	
14 August 2024	GK	(Morocco)	Mehdi Maftah	–	End of contract	
10 June 2025	FW	(Morocco)	Nassim Chadli	(United Arab Emirates) Al Ain FC	Undisclosed	

=== Loans out ===
Date from	Position	Nationality	Name	To	Date to	Ref.
31 January 2025	GK	(Morocco)	Abdelali Mhamdi	(Saudi Arabia) Al Batin FC	30 June 2025	
31 January 2025	DF	(Morocco)	Nabil Marmouk	(Saudi Arabia) Abha Club	30 June 2025	
6 February 2025	FW	(Morocco)	Nassim Chadli	(United Arab Emirates) Al Jazira Club	30 June 2025	

=== Released ===
Date	Position	Nationality	Name	Joined	Date	Ref
24 June 2024	MF	(Algeria)	Zakaria Draoui	–	–	
24 June 2024	DF	(Algeria)	Ilyes Chetti	–	–	
24 June 2024	FW	(Libya)	Hamdou Elhouni	–	–	
1 August 2024	FW	(Morocco)	Charki El Bahri	–	–	
25 August 2024	DF	(Morocco)	Amine Farhane	–	–	
26 August 2024	DF	(Morocco)	Badr Gaddarine	–	–	

=== Contract renewals ===
Date	Position	Nationality	Name	Until	Ref
7 March 2025	DF	(Morocco)	Jamal Harkass	30 June 2026	

== Pre-season and friendlies ==
Win Draw Loss Fixtures

11 August 2024	Club Africain (Tunisia)	1–1	(Morocco) Wydad AC	Tunis, Tunisia
20:00 UTC+1	Marmouk 27' (o.g.)	Report	Rayhi 70'	Stadium: Hammadi Agrebi Stadium

23 August 2024	Olympique Club de Khouribga	1–4	Wydad AC	Khouribga
19:00 UTC+1	(?)	Report	Zemraoui (?); Sakhi (?); Bouhra (?)	Stadium: Phosphate Stadium

27 May 2025	Wydad AC (Morocco)	0–1	(Spain) Sevilla FC	Casablanca
20:00 UTC+1	Malsa (yellow card) 24'	Report	Agoumé (yellow card) 25'; Peque 50'; Pedrosa (yellow card) 90+3'	Stadium: Mohammed V Stadium; Referee: Karim Sabry

31 May 2025	Wydad AC (Morocco)	0–1	(Portugal) FC Porto	Casablanca
17:00 UTC+1	Moufid (yellow card) 9'	Report	Aghehowa 37'; Gomes (yellow card) 90+2'	Stadium: Mohammed V Stadium; Referee: Samir Guezzaz

12 June 2025	Wydad AC (Morocco)	7–0	(Canada) CS St-Laurent	Washington, D.C., United States
	Obeng; Aziz Ki; Mwalimu; Rahyi; Zemraoui	Report

== Competitions ==
=== Overview ===
Competition	First match	Last match	Starting round	Final position	Record							
Competition	First match	Last match	Starting round	Final position	Pld	W	D	L	GF	GA	GD	Win %
Botola	30 August 2024	11 May 2025	Matchday 1	3rd	30	14	12	4	45	27	+18	46.67
Throne Cup	28 March 2025	5 April 2025	Round of 32	Round of 16	2	1	0	1	1	1	+0	50.00
Excellence Cup	3 September 2024	2025	Group Stage	Group stage	8	3	2	3	11	6	+5	37.50
FIFA Club World Cup	18 June 2025	26 June 2025	Group Stage	Group stage (4th)	3	0	0	3	2	8	−6	0.00
Total					43	18	14	11	59	42	+17	41.86

Source: Competitions

=== Botola ===
==== League table ====
Pos	Team	Pld	W	D	L	GF	GA	GD	Pts	Qualification or relegation
1	RS Berkane (C)	30	21	7	2	49	14	+35	70	Qualification for Champions League
2	AS FAR	30	16	9	5	48	24	+24	57	Qualification for Champions League
3	Wydad AC	30	14	12	4	45	27	+18	54	Qualification for Confederation Cup
4	FUS Rabat	30	14	8	8	53	26	+27	50	
5	Raja CA	30	12	12	6	38	25	+13	48	

Source: FRMF.ma
Rules for classification: 1) Points; 2a) Head-to-head goal difference if they are two teams with equal points; 2b) Goal difference if they are more than two teams with equal points; 3) Number of wins; 4) Goals scored; 5) Play-off between involved teams.
(C) Champions

==== Results summary ====
Overall								Home						Away					
Pld	W	D	L	GF	GA	GD	Pts	W	D	L	GF	GA	GD	W	D	L	GF	GA	GD
30	14	12	4	45	27	+18	54	9	4	2	26	15	+11	5	8	2	19	12	+7

Source: Competitive matches

==== Results by round ====
Round	1	2	3	4	5	6	7	8	9	10	11	12	13	14	15	16	17	18	19	20	21	22	23	24	25	26	27	28	29	30
Ground	A	H	A	H	A	H	A	H	A	H	A	H	A	H	A	H	A	H	A	H	A	H	A	H	A	H	A	H	A	H
Result	L	W	D	W	D	W	L	L	W	D	D	W	D	W	D	L	W	W	W	W	W	D	D	D	D	D	D	W	W	W
Position	15	9	8	4	6	3	5	8	5	6	5	3	5	4	4	6	6	6	4	4	2	2	2	3	3	3	3	3	3	3
Points	0	3	4	7	8	11	11	11	14	15	16	19	20	23	24	24	27	30	33	36	39	40	41	42	43	44	45	48	51	54

Source: Competitive matches
A = Away; H = Home; W = Win; D = Draw; L = Loss

==== Matches ====
The league fixtures were released on 9 August 2024.

Win Draw Loss Fixtures

30 August 2024 1	Maghreb de Fès	1–0	Wydad AC	Fez
21:00 UTC+1	Ouakef (yellow card) 72'; El Janati 90+4' (pen.); El Harrach (yellow card) 90+11'	Report	Moufid (yellow card) 84'; Nassi (yellow card) 90+13'	Stadium: Stade Hassan-II; Referee: Mohamed Lahouidri

14 September 2024 2	Wydad AC	1–0	MA Tétouan	Casablanca
18:00 UTC+1	Harkass (yellow card) 38'; Chadli 90+6' (pen.); El Habach (red card) 90+7'	Report	Zerri (yellow card) 73'	Stadium: Larbi Zaouli Stadium; Referee: Abdelmounaim Baslam

20 September 2024 3	Union de Touarga	1–1	Wydad AC	Khemisset
18:00 UTC+1	Dahak 16' (pen.); El Khalej (yellow card) 45+3'; Essadak (yellow card) 90'	Report	Benktib (yellow card) 35'; Nassi 37'; Dairani (yellow card) 54'; Moufid (yellow card) 54'	Stadium: 18 November Stadium; Attendance: 0 Referee: Saadi Hanafi

28 September 2024 4	Wydad AC	4–1	Difaâ Hassani El Jadidi	Casablanca
18:00 UTC+1	Marmouk (yellow card) 37', (goal) 45+6'; Nassi 47'; Moutaraji 70'; Rayhi 90+5'; Viana (yellow card) 90+8'	Report	Abaaziz (yellow card) 36'; Fatine 39' (pen.); Hadhoudi (yellow card) 45+1'; El Hassnaoui (yellow card) 45+8'; Lemzaouri (yellow card) 90+1'	Stadium: Larbi Zaouli Stadium; Referee: Mohamed El Barodi

5 October 2024 5	Hassania Agadir	1–1	Wydad AC	Berrechid
20:00 UTC+1	Ech-Chamakh 51' (pen.); Kati (yellow card) 77'	Report	Nassik (yellow card) 40'; Sakhi 69'; Marmouk (yellow card) 77'; Moufid (yellow card) 90+2'; Rayhi (yellow card) 90+7'	Stadium: Berrechid Municipal Stadium; Attendance: 0 Referee: Said Boujidi

19 October 2024 6	Wydad AC	3–2	SCC Mohammédia	Casablanca
20:00 UTC+1	Niang 23' (pen.), 66'; Pedrinho (yellow card) 33'; Harkass 69'; Moufid (yellow card) 81'	Report	Malik (yellow card) 26'; Foutat 51'; Rhailouf (yellow card) 58'; El Jadidi (yellow card) 63'; Ennakhli 82' (pen.)	Stadium: Larbi Zaouli Stadium; Referee: Ahmed Aderdour

23 October 2024 7	COD Meknès	2–0	Wydad AC	Fez
16:00 UTC+1	Karnass (yellow card) 22'; Berdad 57' (pen.); El Mahraoui 75' (pen.); Bounaga (yellow card) 90+5'	Report	Benktib (yellow card) 19'; Mahrous (yellow card) 56'; El Motie (yellow card) 64'; Harkass (yellow card) 74'; Niang (penalty missed) 90+5	Stadium: Stade Hassan-II; Referee: Naoufel Nachit

26 October 2024 8	Wydad AC	0–1	RS Berkane	Casablanca
20:00 UTC+1	Niang (yellow card) 29'; Bouhra (yellow card) 85'	Report	Mehri (yellow card) 45'; Santos (red card) 50'; Khairi 75'; El Moussaoui (yellow card) 76'; Mohamedi (yellow card) 90'	Stadium: Larbi Zaouli Stadium; Referee: Mouhcine Sourdy

3 November 2024 9	Fath Union Sport	0–1	Wydad AC	Mohammedia
18:00 UTC+1	Mahir (yellow card) 90+1'; Benyachou (yellow card) 90+3'	Report	Mailula 88', (yellow card) 89'	Stadium: El Bachir Stadium; Referee: Yassine Bouslim

9 November 2024 10	Wydad AC	2–2	IR Tanger	Casablanca
20:00 UTC+1	Moutaraji 31'; Harkass (yellow card) 52'; Bouna Amar 83'; Chadli (yellow card) 90+4'	Report	Jarfi (yellow card) 33'; Faouzi 45+3'; Saoud 53' (pen.); Kiani (yellow card) 58'; Bencherifa (yellow card) 75'	Stadium: Larbi Zaouli Stadium; Referee: Mohamed Jamlaoui

22 November 2024 11	Raja CA	1–1	Wydad AC	Casablanca
18:00 UTC+1	Bougrine (yellow card) 41'; Ennaffati (yellow card) 48'; Sakho 53'; Bikoro (yellow card) 71'	Report	El Motie (yellow card) 11'; Moutaraji (yellow card) 21'; Niang (yellow card) 67'; Rayhi 78'	Stadium: Larbi Zaouli Stadium; Attendance: 0 Referee: Karim Sabry

29 November 2024 12	Wydad AC	1–0	OC Safi	Casablanca
20:00 UTC+1	Zemraoui 3'; Bouchta (yellow card) 78'; Boutouil (yellow card) 90+4'; Bouhra (yellow card) 90+6'	Report	Diarra (yellow card) 37'; Lamirat (yellow card) 47'; Qassaq (yellow card) 71'; Morsli (yellow card) 84'	Stadium: Larbi Zaouli Stadium; Referee: Naoufal Nachite

14 December 2024 14	Wydad AC	3–0	JS Soualem	Casablanca
18:00 UTC+1	Zemraoui 6'; El Moubarik 31'; Moufid (yellow card) 38'; Harkass (yellow card) 55'; Bouna Amar 62'	Report	Ouhrou (yellow card) 87'	Stadium: Larbi Zaouli Stadium; Referee: Abderrahim Arrakhiz

19 December 2024 13	AS FAR	2–2	Wydad AC	Kenitra
18:00 UTC+1	Hrimat 4'; El Fahli 49'; Naji (yellow card) 54'; Aït Ouarkhane (yellow card) 59'; Boukhriss (yellow card) 65'; Baka (yellow card) 76'; Nakach (yellow card) 90+2'	Report	Zemraoui 14'; Rayhi 18'; Moufid (yellow card) 40'; Boutouil (yellow card) 42' (red card) 74'; Chadli (yellow card) 90+4'	Stadium: Kenitra Municipal Stadium; Referee: Achraf Berrada

23 December 2024 15	RCA Zemamra	0–0	Wydad AC	Zemamra
18:00 UTC+1	Moussaddaq (yellow card) 57'; Camara (yellow card) 58'; El Bajjani (yellow card) 90+2'	Report	Rayhi (yellow card) 34'; Mailula (yellow card) 66'; Harkass (yellow card) 86'; Marmouk (yellow card) 89'; Bouchta (yellow card) 90+3'	Stadium: Stade Ahmed Choukri; Referee: Mohamed El Baroudi

28 December 2024 16	Wydad AC	1–4	Maghreb de Fès	Casablanca
20:00 UTC+1	Benktib (red card) 11'; Rayhi 21'; Dairani (yellow card) 81'	Report	Seakanyeng 39'; Mestari (yellow card) 57'; El Badoui 76', (yellow card) 87', (goal) 90+9'; Ahadad 82'; Chihab (yellow card) 88'; Brija (yellow card) 90+2'	Stadium: Larbi Zaouli Stadium; Referee: Samir Guezzaz

4 January 2025 17	Moghreb Tétouan	1–2	Wydad AC	Tétouan
18:00 UTC+1	Al Cheikhi (yellow card) 45+2'; Karmoun (yellow card) 65'	Report	Boutouil (yellow card) 12'; Rayhi 17' (pen.), 29'; Moufid (yellow card) 41'; Zemraoui (yellow card) 45+2'; Bouchta (yellow card) 60'; Harkass (yellow card) 74'	Stadium: Stade Saniat Rmel; Referee: Azzedine Aboulfaid

12 January 2025 18	Wydad AC	2–1	Union de Touarga	Casablanca
20:00 UTC+1	Rayhi 23' (pen.); Bouna Amar (yellow card) 45+2'; El Moubarik 88'; Boutouil (yellow card) 90+5'	Report	Kajai 17', (yellow card) 22'; Berqi (yellow card) 90+1'	Stadium: Larbi Zaouli Stadium; Referee: Amine Maataoui

19 January 2025 19	Difaâ Hassani El Jadidi	0–2	Wydad AC	El Jadida
19:00 UTC+1	Faris (yellow card) 80'; Jamaane (yellow card) 82'	Report	Rayhi 38' (pen.); El Motie (yellow card) 41'; Moutaraji (yellow card) 45'; Mailula 61'; Dairani (yellow card) 65'	Stadium: Ben M'Hamed El Abdi Stadium; Referee: Mouhcine Sourdy

9 February 2025 20	Wydad AC	2–0	Hassania Agadir	Casablanca
20:00 UTC+1	Harkass 22'; Moutaraji 34'	Report	Benabid (yellow card) 65'; Katiba (yellow card) 65'	Stadium: Larbi Zaouli Stadium; Referee: Hamza El Fareq

16 February 2025 21	SCC Mohammédia	1–5	Wydad AC	Mohammedia
18:00 UTC+1	Malik (yellow card) 23' (yellow-red card) 49'; Dalouzi 59'	Report	Rayhi (yellow card) 5', (penalty missed) 51', 51'; Arthur (yellow card) 18'; Mailula 33'; Sani 84' (o.g.); Obeng 87'; Malsa 90+1', (yellow card) 90+2'	Stadium: El Bachir Stadium; Referee: Redouane Boudlal

22 February 2025 22	Wydad AC	0–0	COD Meknès	Casablanca
16:00 UTC+1	Malsa (yellow card) 25'	Report	Radouani (yellow card) 28'; Eddib (yellow card) 39'; El Mahraoui (yellow card) 65'; Senhaji (yellow card) 87'; Mihrab (yellow card) 90+2'	Stadium: Larbi Zaouli Stadium; Referee: Mohamed Lahouidri

28 February 2025 23	RS Berkane	0–0	Wydad AC	Berkane
21:00 UTC+0	El Moussaoui (yellow card) 70'	Report	Rayhi (yellow card) 43'; Bouhra (yellow card) 73'	Stadium: Stade Municipal de Berkane; Referee: Achraf Berrada

9 March 2025 24	Wydad AC	2–2	Fath Union Sport	Casablanca
22:00 UTC+0	Moufi (yellow card) 59'; Zemraoui 81'; Sakhi 85'	Report	Hannouri 35'; Mahir (yellow card) 45+2'; Souane (yellow card) 59'; Diakite (yellow card) 76'; Tazi 90', (yellow card) 90+1'	Stadium: Larbi Zaouli Stadium; Referee: Nawfal Nachit

15 March 2025 25	Ittihad Tanger	1–1	Wydad AC	Tangier
22:00 UTC+0	Bencherifa (yellow card) 35'; Moutaouali (yellow card) 67'; El Wasti (yellow card) 68'; El Moudene (yellow card) 75'; El Bellali (yellow card) 77'; El Bahja 78'	Report	Lorch 30'; Moufi (yellow card) 50'; Harkass (yellow card) 73'; Dairani (yellow card) 89'	Stadium: Stade du Village Sportif de Tanger; Referee: Hamza El Fareq

12 April 2024 26	Wydad AC	1–1	Raja CA	Casablanca
20:00 UTC+1	Rayhi 18' (pen.); Moufi (yellow card) 85'; Boucheta (yellow card) 90+5'	Report	Rahimi 27'; Baadi (yellow card) 56'; Sakho (yellow card) 90+5'	Stadium: Stade Mohammed V Referee: Jalal Jayed

23 April 2025 27	OC Safi	1–1	Wydad AC	Safi
20:00 UTC+1	Lamirat (yellow card) 45'; Ashabi 86'	Report	Zemraoui 3'; Dairani (yellow card) 26'; Moufid (yellow card) 40'; El Moubarik (yellow card) 69' (yellow-red card) 71'	Stadium: Stade El Massira; Referee: Azzedine Aboulfaid

3 May 2025 28	Wydad AC	2–1	AS FAR	Casablanca
20:00 UTC+1	Harkass (yellow card) 22'; Obeng 32'; Boucheta (yellow card) 37'; Lorch 67'; Bouhra (yellow card) 90+3'	Report	Nakach (yellow card) 29'; Hadraf 57'; El Fahli (yellow card) 59'; Hrimat (yellow card) 62'; Essaoubi (yellow card) 88'	Stadium: Stade Mohammed V Referee: Hamza El Fareq

8 May 2025 29	JS Soualem	0–2	Wydad AC	Berrechid
20:00 UTC+1	Hmaidou (yellow card) 16'	Report	Mailula 29'; Boutouil 78'	Stadium: Berrechid Municipal Stadium; Referee: Hicham Tamsamani

11 May 2025 30	Wydad AC	2–0	RCA Zemamra	Casablanca
20:00 UTC+1	Rayhi 12' (pen.); Mailula 44'	Report	Jarici (yellow card) 28'; Farah (yellow card) 33'; Ajako (red card) 90+1'	Stadium: Stade Mohammed V Referee: Youssef Triki

=== Throne Cup ===
Win Draw Loss Fixtures

28 March 2025 Round of 32	Wydad AC	1–0	Fath Union Sport	Casablanca
22:00 UTC+0	Moufid 58'	Report		Stadium: Larbi Zaouli Stadium; Referee: Amine Maataoui

5 April 2025 Round of 16	Moghreb Tétouan	1–0	Wydad AC	Tétouan
16:00 UTC+1	Lakhal 78'	Report		Stadium: Stade Saniat Rmel; Referee: Youssef Triki

=== Excellence Cup ===
==== Group stage ====
===== Group E =====
Win Draw Loss Fixtures

3 September 2024 1	Wydad AC	2–0	JS Massira	Casablanca
18:00 UTC+1	Zemraoui 42'; Chadli 90+7'	Report		Stadium: Larbi Zaouli Stadium

8 September 2024 2	Wydad AC	0–0	KAC Marrakech	Casablanca
17:00 UTC+1		Report		Stadium: Larbi Zaouli Stadium

8 October 2024 3	JS Soualem	1–0	Wydad AC	Berrechid
20:00 UTC+1	Amantag 38'	Report		Stadium: Berrechid Municipal Stadium

11 October 2024 4	JS Massira	0–5	Wydad AC	Mohammedia
16:00 UTC+1		Report	Boutouil 14'; Pedrinho 40'; Arthur 45+6' (pen.); Moudayane 68'; Faidi 79' (pen.)	Stadium: El Bachir Stadium; Attendance: 0

=== FIFA Club World Cup ===
Wydad AC qualified for the tournament as the winners of the 2021–22 CAF Champions League.

==== Group stage ====
===== Group G =====
The group stage draw was held on 5 December 2024.

Pos	Team	Pld	W	D	L	GF	GA	GD	Pts	Qualification
1	(England) Manchester City	3	3	0	0	13	2	+11	9	Advance to knockout stage
2	(Italy) Juventus	3	2	0	1	11	6	+5	6	Advance to knockout stage
3	(United Arab Emirates) Al Ain	3	1	0	2	2	12	−10	3	
4	(Morocco) Wydad AC	3	0	0	3	2	8	−6	0	

Source: FIFA
Rules for classification: Group stage tiebreakers

Win Draw Loss Fixtures

18 June 2025 1	Manchester City (England)	2–0	(Morocco) Wydad AC	Philadelphia, United States
12:00 UTC−4	Foden 2'; Doku 42'; Lewis (red card) 88'	Report	Mailula (yellow card) 16'	Stadium: Lincoln Financial Field; Attendance: 37,446; Referee: Ramon Abatti (Brazil)

22 June 2025 2	Juventus (Italy)	4–1	(Morocco) Wydad AC	Philadelphia, United States
12:00 UTC−4	Boutouil 6' (o.g.); Yıldız 16', 69'; Thuram (yellow card) 77'; Vlahović 90+4' (pen.)	Report	Meijers (yellow card) 22'; Lorch 25'; Ferreira (yellow card) 51'	Stadium: Lincoln Financial Field; Attendance: 31,975; Referee: Saíd Martínez (Honduras)

26 June 2025 3	Wydad AC (Morocco)	1–2	(United Arab Emirates) Al Ain	Washington, D.C., United States
15:00 UTC−4	Mailula 4'; Mwalimu (yellow card) 68'; Amrabat (yellow card) 83'; Benktib (yellow card) 90+3'	Report	Palacios (yellow card) 10'; Laba 45+1' (pen.); Traoré (yellow card) 45+2'; Kaku 50'	Stadium: Audi Field; Attendance: 10,785; Referee: Drew Fischer (Canada)

== Squad statistics ==
=== Appearances and goals ===
No.	Pos	Nat	Player	Total		Botola		Throne Cup		Excellence Cup		FIFA Club World Cup	
No.	Pos	Nat	Player	Apps	Goals	Apps	Goals	Apps	Goals	Apps	Goals	Apps	Goals
Goalkeepers
1	GK	(Morocco) MAR	Youssef El Motie	19	0	15+1	0	2	0	1	0	0	0
12	GK	(Morocco) MAR	Mehdi Benabid	14	0	11	0	0	0	0	0	3	0
36	GK	(Morocco) MAR	Omar Aqzdaou	5	0	2	0	0	0	3	0	0	0
Defenders
2	DF	(Morocco) MAR	Mouhamed Moufid	29	1	21+3	0	2	1	0	0	3	0
3	DF	(Morocco) MAR	Zakaria Nassik	13	0	8+5	0	0	0	0	0	0	0
13	DF	(Morocco) MAR	Ayman Dairani	23	0	14+6	0	2	0	1	0	0	0
14	DF	(Morocco) MAR	Abdelmounaim Boutouil	22	2	18	1	0	0	2	1	2	0
15	DF	(Morocco) MAR	Mohammed El Jadidi	2	0	0+2	0	0	0	0	0	0	0
16	DF	(Morocco) MAR	Jamal Harkass	30	2	26	2	2	0	0	0	1+1	0
18	DF	(Morocco) MAR	Fahd Moufi	13	0	10+1	0	0	0	0	0	2	0
22	DF	(Netherlands) NED	Bart Meijers	3	0	0	0	0	0	0	0	2+1	0
24	DF	(Morocco) MAR	Ayoub Boucheta	23	0	19	0	2	0	1	0	1	0
72	DF	(Brazil) BRA	Guilherme Ferreira	3	0	0	0	0	0	0	0	3	0
	DF	(Morocco) MAR	Nabil Marmouk	11	1	5+5	1	0	0	1	0	0	0
Midfielders
4	MF	(South Africa) RSA	Thembinkosi Lorch	16	3	9+2	2	2	0	0	0	3	1
5	MF	(Morocco) MAR	Ismail Moutaraji	27	3	15+8	3	1	0	1	0	0+2	0
7	MF	(Martinique) MTQ	Mickaël Malsa	6	1	1+4	1	0	0	0	0	0+1	0
10	MF	(Brazil) BRA	Arthur	16	1	6+8	0	0	0	2	1	0	0
19	MF	(Morocco) MAR	El Mehdi El Moubarik	25	1	17+3	1	2	0	0	0	3	0
20	MF	(Morocco) MAR	Mouad Aounzou	9	0	1+8	0	0	0	0	0	0	0
23	MF	(Morocco) MAR	Oussama Zemraoui	27	6	18+5	5	0	0	1	1	3	0
25	MF	(Burkina Faso) BFA	Stephane Aziz Ki	2	0	0	0	0	0	0	0	0+2	0
27	MF	(Morocco) MAR	Ismael Benktib	8	0	4+2	0	0	0	1	0	0+1	0
33	MF	(Brazil) BRA	Pedrinho	10	1	2+6	0	0	0	2	1	0	0
44	MF	(Morocco) MAR	Rayane Mahtou	3	1	1	0	0	0	2	1	0	0
	MF	(Morocco) MAR	Hamza Sakhi	26	2	20+5	2	1	0	0	0	0	0
Forwards
6	FW	(Morocco) MAR	Mounir El Habach	3	0	0+1	0	0	0	2	0	0	0
8	FW	(Netherlands) NED	Mohamed Rayhi	28	12	17+9	11	2	0	0	0+1	0	0
9	FW	(Ghana) GHA	Samuel Obeng	16	2	4+7	2	2	0	0	0	1+2	0
11	FW	(Morocco) MAR	Nordin Amrabat	3	0	0	0	0	0	0	0	3	0
17	FW	(Morocco) MAR	Zakaria Fathi	7	0	2+5	0	0	0	0	0	0	0
21	FW	(South Africa) RSA	Cassius Mailula	34	4	20+7	3	0	0	4	0	2+1	1
26	FW	(Tanzania) TAN	Selemani Mwalimu	5	0	0+3	0	0	0	0	0	0+2	0
30	FW	(Morocco) MAR	Saifeddine Bouhra	18	0	7+9	0	0	0	2	0	0	0
99	FW	(Syria) SYR	Omar Al Somah	2	0	0	0	0	0	0	0	1+1	0
	FW	(France) FRA	Walid Nassi	21	2	9+9	2	2	0	1	0	0	0
	FW	(Brazil) BRA	Renan Viana	2	0	0+1	0	0	0	1	0	0	0
Players transferred/loaned out during the season
5	MF	(Morocco) MAR	Oussama Mahrous	8	0	5+1	0	0	0	2	0	0	0
9	FW	(Senegal) SEN	M'Baye Niang	8	2	5+3	2	0	0	0	0	0	0
12	GK	(Morocco) MAR	Abdelali Mhamdi	2	0	2	0	0	0	0	0	0	0
15	FW	(Morocco) MAR	Chouaib Faidi	2	1	1	0	0	0	0+1	1	0	0
17	FW	(Morocco) MAR	Zacarías Ghailán	2	0	0	0	0	0	2	0	0	0
28	FW	(Morocco) MAR	Nassim Chadli	12	2	6+5	1	0	0	0+1	1	0	0
29	FW	(Mauritania) MTN	Sidi Bouna Amar	14	2	8+6	2	0	0	0	0	0	0
31	FW	(Morocco) MAR	Ismail Moumen	0	0	0	0	0	0	0	0	0	0
40	GK	(France) FRA	Boubacar Bah	0	0	0	0	0	0	0	0	0	0

Source: Soccerway

=== Goalscorers ===
Rank	No.	Pos.	Nat.	Name	Botola	Throne Cup	Excellence Cup	FIFA Club World Cup	Total
1	8	FW	(Netherlands)	Mohamed Rayhi	11	0	0	0	11
2	21	FW	(South Africa)	Cassius Mailula	5	0	0	1	6
2	23	MF	(Morocco)	Oussama Zemraoui	5	0	1	0	6
4	4 (Note: Nabil Marmouk wore number 4 until his departure to Abha Club on 31 January 2025. Thembinkosi Lorch replaced him as number 4.)	MF	(South Africa)	Thembinkosi Lorch	2	0	0	1	3
4	5	MF	(Morocco)	Ismail Moutaraji	3	0	0	0	3
6	9 (Note: M'Baye Niang wore number 9 until his departure to Sampdoria on 20 December 2024. Samuel Obeng replaced him as number 9.)	FW	(Ghana)	Samuel Obeng	2	0	0	0	2
6	9	FW	(Senegal)	M'Baye Niang	2	0	0	0	2
6	11	FW	(France)	Walid Nassi	2	0	0	0	2
6	14	DF	(Morocco)	Abdelmounaim Boutouil	1	0	1	0	2
6	16	DF	(Morocco)	Jamal Harkass	2	0	0	0	2
6	19	MF	(Morocco)	El Mehdi El Moubarik	2	0	0	0	2
6	22	MF	(Morocco)	Hamza Sakhi	2	0	0	0	2
6	28	FW	(Morocco)	Nassim Chadli	1	0	1	0	2
6	29	FW	(Mauritania)	Sidi Bouna Amar	2	0	0	0	2
15	2	DF	(Morocco)	Mohamed Moufid	0	1	0	0	1
15	4	DF	(Morocco)	Nabil Marmouk	1	0	0	0	1
15	7	MF	(Martinique)	Mickaël Malsa	1	0	0	0	1
15	10	MF	(Brazil)	Arthur	0	0	1	0	1
15	15	FW	(Morocco)	Chouaib Faidi	0	0	1	0	1
15	33	MF	(Brazil)	Pedrinho	0	0	1	0	1
15	39	FW	(Morocco)	Zakaria Moudayane	0	0	1	0	1
Own goals					1	0	0	0	1
Totals					45	1	7	2	55

*Italic: Left the team during the season.

=== Clean sheets ===
Rank	No.	Pos.	Nat.	Name	Botola	Throne Cup	Excellence Cup	FIFA Club World Cup	Total
1	1	GK	(Morocco)	Youssef El Motie	6	1	1	0	8
2	12 (Note: Abdelali Mhamdi wore number 12 until his departure to Al Batin on 1 February 2025. Mehdi Benabid replaced him as number 12.)	GK	(Morocco)	Mehdi Benabid	5	0	0	0	5
3	36	GK	(Morocco)	Omar Aqzdaou	0	0	2	0	2
4	12	GK	(Morocco)	Abdelali Mhamdi	0	0	0	0	0
Totals					11	1	3	0	15

*Italic: Left the team during the season.

=== Disciplinary record ===
No.	Pos.	Nat.	Player	Botola		Throne Cup		Excellence Cup		FIFA Club World Cup		Total	
No.	Pos.	Nat.	Player	Yellow card	Red card	Yellow card	Red card	Yellow card	Red card	Yellow card	Red card	Yellow card	Red card
1	GK	(Morocco)	Youssef El Motie	3	0	0	0	0	0	0	0	3	0
2	DF	(Morocco)	Mouhamed Moufid	8	0	0	0	0	0	0	0	8	0
3	DF	(Morocco)	Zakaria Nassik	1	0	0	0	0	0	0	0	1	0
5	MF	(Morocco)	Ismail Moutaraji	2	0	0	0	0	0	0	0	2	0
6	FW	(Morocco)	Mounir El Habach	0	1	0	0	0	0	0	0	0	1
7 (Note: Renan Viana wore number 7 until 29 Januanry 2025. Mickaël Malsa replaced him as number 7.)	FW	(Brazil)	Renan Viana	1	0	0	0	0	0	0	0	1	0
7	MF	(Martinique)	Mickaël Malsa	2	0	0	0	0	0	0	0	2	0
8	FW	(Netherlands)	Mohamed Rayhi	4	0	0	0	0	0	0	0	4	0
10	MF	(Brazil)	Arthur	1	0	0	0	0	0	0	0	1	0
11	FW	(Morocco)	Nordin Amrabat	0	0	0	0	0	0	1	0	1	0
13	DF	(Morocco)	Ayman Dairani	5	0	0	0	0	0	0	0	5	0
14	DF	(Morocco)	Abdelmounaim Boutouil	4	1	0	0	0	0	0	0	4	1
16	DF	(Morocco)	Jamal Harkass	8	0	0	0	0	0	0	0	8	0
18	DF	(Morocco)	Fahd Moufi	3	0	0	0	0	0	0	0	3	0
19	MF	(Morocco)	El Mehdi El Moubarik	2	1	0	0	0	0	0	0	2	1
21	FW	(South Africa)	Cassius Mailula	2	0	0	0	0	0	1	0	3	0
22	DF	(Netherlands)	Bart Meijers	0	0	0	0	0	0	1	0	1	0
23	MF	(Morocco)	Oussama Zemraoui	1	0	0	0	0	0	0	0	1	0
24	DF	(Morocco)	Ayoub Bouchta	5	0	0	0	0	0	0	0	5	0
26	FW	(Tanzania)	Selemani Mwalimu	0	0	0	0	0	0	1	0	1	0
27	MF	(Morocco)	Ismael Benktib	2	1	0	0	0	0	1	0	3	1
30	FW	(Morocco)	Saifeddine Bouhra	3	0	0	0	0	0	0	0	3	0
33	MF	(Brazil)	Pedrinho	1	0	0	0	0	0	0	0	1	0
72	DF	(Brazil)	Guilherme Ferreira	0	0	0	0	0	0	1	0	1	0
	FW	(France)	Walid Nassi	1	0	0	0	0	0	0	0	1	0
Players transferred/loaned out during the season
4	DF	(Morocco)	Nabil Marmouk	3	0	0	0	0	0	0	0	3	0
5	MF	(Morocco)	Oussama Mahrous	1	0	0	0	0	0	0	0	1	0
9	FW	(Senegal)	M'Baye Niang	2	0	0	0	0	0	0	0	2	0
28	FW	(Morocco)	Nassim Chadli	3	0	0	0	0	0	0	0	3	0
29	FW	(Mauritania)	Sidi Bouna Amar	1	0	0	0	0	0	0	0	1	0
Totals				69	4	0	0	0	0	6	0	75	4

== Club awards ==
=== Player of the Month award ===
Month	Player	Ref.
September	(Morocco) Nassim Chadli	
October	(Morocco) Jamal Harkass	
November	(Morocco) El Mehdi El Moubarik	
December	(Netherlands) Mohamed Rayhi	
January	(South Africa) Cassius Mailula	
February	(Morocco) El Mehdi El Moubarik	
March	(South Africa) Thembinkosi Lorch	
