= 2025–26 Wydad AC season =

Wydad AC
2025–26 season
- President: Hicham Ait Menna
- Head coach: Mohamed Amine Benhachem
- Stadium: Stade Mohammed V
- Botola: 1st
- Throne Cup: Round of 32
- Excellence Cup: Group stage
- CAF Confederation Cup: Group stage
- Top goalscorer: League: Hamza Hannouri (3 goals); All: Hamza Hannouri (3 goals)
- Average home league attendance: 26,872
- Biggest win: 3–1 vs RCA Zemamra (Home, Botola Pro); 3–1 vs COD Meknès (Away, Botola Pro)
- Biggest defeat: 1–2 vs AS Maniema Union (Away, Confederation Cup)
Home colours	Away colours	Third colours
- All statistics correct as of 1 February 2026.

The 2025–26 season is Wydad Athletic Club's 89th season in existence, their 86th football season and the club's 70th consecutive season in the top flight of Moroccan football. Wydad is participating in this season's edition of the Botola Pro, the Throne Cup, the Moroccan Excellence Cup and the CAF Confederation Cup.

== Technical staff ==
As of 20 July 2025.

Position	Name
Coaching staff
Head coach	(Morocco) Mohamed Amine Benhachem
Assistant coaches	(Morocco) Abdessamad Ouarrad (Morocco) Brahim Nekkach
Goalkeepers coach	(Morocco) Zouhair Laaroubi
Data analyst	(Morocco) Agdal Tarek
Tactical analyst	(Senegal) Elhadji Abdoulaye Seck
Set-piece coach	(Morocco) Fouad Taalat
Physical trainer	(Morocco) Idriss Saissi Hassani
Front office
Technical manager	(Morocco) Hassan Benabicha

== Squad information ==
As of 3 October 2025.

Note: Flags indicate national team as defined under FIFA eligibility rules; some limited exceptions apply. Players may hold more than one non-FIFA nationality.

- Ages on 30 June 2026.

No.	Pos.	Player	Nat.	Date of birth (Age)	Signed in	Notes
Goalkeepers
1	GK	Abdelali Mhamdi	(Morocco)	29 November 1991 (aged 34)	2025	—
16	GK	Mehdi Benabid	(Morocco)	24 January 1998 (aged 28)	2025	—
	GK	Youssef El Motie	(Morocco)	16 December 1994 (aged 31)	2022	—
Defenders
2	RB	Mohamed Moufid	(Morocco)	12 January 2000 (aged 26)	2024	—
4	CB	Amine Aboulfath	(Morocco)	27 October 1997 (aged 28)	2025	—
5	CB	Mohammed El Jadidi	(Morocco)	20 July 2004 (aged 21)	2025	—
14	CB	Guilherme Ferreira	(Brazil)	2 December 1999 (aged 26)	2025	—
22	CB	Bart Meijers	(Netherlands)	10 January 1997 (aged 29)	2025	—
24	LB	Ayoub Boucheta	(Morocco)	3 December 1993 (aged 32)	2024	—
34	RB	Mohamed Bouchouari	(Belgium)	15 November 2000 (aged 25)	2025	—
Midfielders
3	AM	Thembinkosi Lorch	(South Africa)	22 July 1993 (aged 32)	2025	—
6	CM	Walid Sabbar	(Morocco)	25 February 1996 (aged 30)	2025	—
10	AM	Arthur	(Brazil)	24 February 2005 (aged 21)	2024	—
15	DM	Abdelghafour Lamirat	(Morocco)	26 August 1997 (aged 28)	2025	—
17	CM	Rayane Mahtou	(Morocco)	1 February 2004 (aged 22)	2025	Youth system
20	CM	Mouad Aounzou	(Morocco)	21 May 2001 (aged 25)	2024	—
23	AM	Oussama Zemraoui	(Morocco)	1 March 2001 (aged 25)	2024	—
25	AM	Stephane Aziz Ki	(Burkina Faso)	6 March 1996 (aged 30)	2025	—
27	DM	Joseph Bakasu	(Democratic Republic of the Congo)	25 August 2003 (aged 22)	2025	—
33	CM	Pedrinho	(Brazil)	1 January 2004 (aged 22)	2024	—
	DM	Hamza Sakhi	(Morocco)	7 June 1996 (aged 30)	2024	—
	CM	Yassine Bennani	(Morocco)	17 July 2008 (aged 17)	2025	Youth system
	DM	Hamza El Wasti	(Morocco)	25 October 1995 (aged 30)	2025	—
Forwards
7	RW / LW	Zouhair El Moutaraji	(Morocco)	1 April 1996 (aged 30)	2025	—
8	LW	Mohamed Rayhi	(Netherlands)	1 July 1994 (aged 31)	2024	—
9	ST	Tumisang Orebonye	(Botswana)	26 March 1996 (aged 30)	2025	—
11	RW / LW	Nordin Amrabat (captain)	(Morocco)	31 March 1987 (aged 39)	2025	—
19	ST	Hamza Hannouri	(Morocco)	22 January 1998 (aged 28)	2025	—
28	RW	Walid Nassi	(France)	15 July 2000 (aged 25)	2024	—

== Transfers ==
=== In ===
Date	Position	Nationality	Name	From	Fee	Ref.
1 July 2025	GK	(Morocco)	Abdelali Mhamdi	(Saudi Arabia) Al Batin	Loan return	
1 July 2025	DF	(Brazil)	Guilherme Ferreira	(Portugal) Felgueiras	Undisclosed	
8 July 2025	MF	(Morocco)	Abdelghafour Lamirat	—	Free transfer	
10 July 2025	MF	(Morocco)	Hamza El Wasti	—	Free transfer	
22 July 2025	DF	(Morocco)	Amine Aboulfath	—	Free transfer	
25 July 2025	MF	(Democratic Republic of the Congo)	Joseph Bakasu	(Democratic Republic of the Congo) AS Maniema Union	Undisclosed	
9 August 2025	MF	(Morocco)	Walid Sabbar	RCA Zemamra	Undisclosed	
22 August 2025	MF	(South Africa)	Thembinkosi Lorch	—	Free transfer	
25 August 2025	FW	(Morocco)	Zouhair El Moutaraji		Free transfer	
27 August 2025	FW	(Botswana)	Tumisang Orebonye	—	Free transfer	
27 August 2025	DF	(Belgium)	Mohamed Bouchouari	(France) Rodez AF	Undisclosed	

=== Loans in ===
Date from	Position	Nationality	Name	From	Date to	Ref.

=== Out ===
Date	Position	Nationality	Name	To	Fee	Ref.
30 June 2025	FW	(South Africa)	Cassius Mailula	(United States) Toronto	End of loan	
30 June 2025	FW	(Brazil)	Renan Viana	(Brazil) Club Athletico Paranaense	End of loan	
30 June 2025	MF	(Morocco)	El Mehdi El Moubarik	(United Arab Emirates) Al Ain	End of loan	
30 June 2025	MF	(South Africa)	Thembinkosi Lorch	(South Africa) Mamelodi Sundowns	End of loan	
13 August 2025	DF	(Morocco)	Jamal Harkass	(Saudi Arabia) Damac	Undisclosed	
1 September 2025	FW	(Morocco)	Saifeddine Bouhra	(Bahrain) Al-Khaldiya	Undisclosed	

=== Loans out ===
Date from	Position	Nationality	Name	To	Date to	Ref.
1 July 2025	FW	(Tanzania)	Selemani Mwalimu	(Tanzania) Simba	30 June 2026	
15 August 2025	MF	(Morocco)	Ismael Benktib	COD Meknès	30 June 2026	
11 September 2025	DF	(Morocco)	Ayman Dairani	(Bahrain) Al-Khaldiya	30 June 2026	
14 September 2025	GK	(Morocco)	Omar Aqzdaou	(Spain) Terrassa	30 June 2026	

=== Released ===
Date	Position	Nationality	Name	Ref
1 July 2025	FW	(Morocco)	Mounir El Habach	
1 July 2025	FW	(Morocco)	Zakaria Fathi	
30 July 2025	DF	(Morocco)	Nabil Marmouk	
30 July 2025	DF	(Morocco)	Zakaria Nassik	
27 July 2025	DF	(Morocco)	Fahd Moufi	
23 August 2025	DF	(Morocco)	Abdelmounaim Boutouil	
24 August 2025	MF	(Morocco)	Ismail Moutaraji	
26 August 2025	FW	(Ghana)	Samuel Obeng	
2 September 2025	MF	(Martinique)	Mickaël Malsa	

=== Contract renewals ===
Date	Position	Nationality	Name	Until	Ref

== Pre-season and friendlies ==
Win Draw Loss Fixtures

1 August 2025	Kocaelispor (Turkey)	2–0	(Morocco) Wydad AC	Derince, Turkey
17:30 UTC+3	Petković 5'; Çağlayan 53'	Report		Stadium: İzmit İsmetpaşa Stadium

5 August 2025	Wydad AC (Morocco)	1–0	(Azerbaijan) Turan Tovuz	Derince, Turkey
17:00 UTC+3	Arthur 90+5'	Report		Stadium: İzmit İsmetpaşa Stadium

10 August 2025	Al Sadd SC (Qatar)	1–1 (5–4 p)	(Morocco) Wydad AC	Doha, Qatar
19:30 UTC+3	Afif 56' (pen.)	Report	El Wasti 67'	Stadium: Jassim bin Hamad Stadium

20 August 2025	Wydad AC	2–1	Maghreb of Fez	Bouskoura, Morocco
18:00 UTC+1	El Wasti 29'; Zemraoui 74'	Report	Yamga 69'	Stadium: Wellness Sport Center

== Competitions ==
=== Overview ===
Competition	First match	Last match	Starting round	Record							
Competition	First match	Last match	Starting round	Pld	W	D	L	GF	GA	GD	Win %
Botola	12 September 2025	2026	Matchday 1	12	9	2	1	25	10	+15	75.00
Throne Cup	2026		Round of 32					—			
Excellence Cup	2026		Group stage					—			
CAF Confederation Cup	19 October 2025		Second round	8	7	0	1	15	3	+12	87.50
Total				20	16	2	2	40	13	+27	80.00

Last updated: 8 March 2026
Source: Competitions

=== Botola ===
==== League table ====
Pos	Team	Pld	W	D	L	GF	GA	GD	Pts	Qualification or relegation
3	Raja CA	30	16	8	6	39	19	+20	56	Qualification for Confederation Cup (Note: Since the 2024-25 Throne Cup was postponed until the following season, its spot in the CAF Confederation Cup was given to the fourth placed team.)
4	AS FAR	30	13	16	1	45	22	+23	55	Qualification for Confederation Cup
5	Wydad AC	30	13	4	13	39	33	+6	43	
6	DH El Jadida	30	9	13	8	30	34	−4	40	
7	Ittihad Tanger	30	9	12	9	27	31	−4	39	

Updated to match(es) played on 21 July 2026. Source: FRMF
Rules for classification: 1) Points; 2a) Head-to-head goal difference if there are two teams with equal points; 2b) Goal difference if there are more than two teams with equal points; 3) Number of wins; 4) Goals scored; 5) Play-off between involved teams if necessary.
Source: FRMF Competitions ruleset: Article 54.2

==== Results summary ====
Overall								Home						Away					
Pld	W	D	L	GF	GA	GD	Pts	W	D	L	GF	GA	GD	W	D	L	GF	GA	GD
12	9	2	1	25	10	+15	29	4	1	1	8	3	+5	5	1	0	17	7	+10

Last updated: 8 March 2026.
Source: Competitive matches

==== Results by round ====
Round	1	2	3	4	5	7	6	8	13	14	9	15
Ground	H	A	H	A	H	H	A	A	A	H	H	A
Result	W	D	W	W	D	W	W	W	W	W	L	W
Position	3	5	3	1	1	1	1	1	2	2	2	2
Points	3	4	7	10	11	14	17	20	23	26	26	29

Updated to match(es) played on 8 March 2026. Source: Competitive matches
A = Away; H = Home; W = Win; D = Draw; L = Loss

==== Matches ====
The league fixtures were released on 19 July 2025.

Win Draw Loss Fixtures

12 September 2025 1	Wydad AC	1–0	KAC Marrakech	Casablanca
20:00 UTC+1	Sabbar 36'; Aboulfath (yellow card) 49'	Report	Zghoudi (penalty missed) 16; Mihrab (yellow card) 43'; Omurwa (red card) 81'; Cissé (yellow card) 90+9'	Stadium: Stade Mohammed V Referee: Hicham Tamsamani

19 September 2025 2	US Yacoub El Mansour	1–1	Wydad AC	Rabat
20:00 UTC+1	Balouk (yellow card) 36', (goal) 45+4'	Report	Lorch 51'; Bakasu (yellow card) 54'	Stadium: Rabat Olympic Stadium; Referee: Yassine Bouslim

27 September 2025 3	Wydad AC	3–1	RCA Zemamra	Casablanca
20:00 UTC+1	Moufid 30'; Meijers (yellow card) 39'; Hannouri 69', 80'; Boucheta (yellow card) 75'	Report	El Fakih 49'	Stadium: Stade Mohammed V Referee: Nawfal Nachit

3 October 2025 4	COD Meknès	1–3	Wydad AC	Meknes
18:00 UTC+1	Naji (yellow card) 16'; Berdad 39'; El Bounagate (yellow card) 55'	Report	Bakasu 5'; Lorch 35'; Ferreira (yellow card) 55'; Moufid (yellow card) 57'; Amrabat (yellow card) 61'; Hannouri (yellow card) 66', (goal) 80'; Lamirat (yellow card) 68'; Aboulfath (yellow card) 82'; Benabid (yellow card) 90'	Stadium: Honneur Stadium; Referee: Youssef Triki

29 October 2025 5	Wydad AC	0–0	Raja CA	Casablanca
20:00 UTC+1	Aboulfath (yellow card) 34'; Lamirat (yellow card) 45+11'	Report	Bougrine (yellow card) 34'; Al Makahasi (yellow card) 60'; Al Harrar (yellow card) 90+6'	Stadium: Stade Mohammed V Referee: Mohamed El Baroudi

2 November 2025 7	Wydad AC	2–0	IR Tanger	Casablanca
20:00 UTC+1	Hannouri 7'; Lamirat (yellow card) 36'; Nassi 40'; Ferreira (yellow card) 44' (yellow-red card) 85'; Aboulfath (yellow card) 45+1'; Bouchouari (yellow card) 90+7'	Report	El Bahja (yellow card) 45+1'; Gaye (yellow card) 65'	Stadium: Stade Mohammed V Referee: Mohamed Lahouidri

5 November 2025 6	Hassania Agadir	1–2	Wydad AC	Mohammedia
16:00 UTC+1	Bakhkhach 18'; Tachtach (yellow card) 49'; Beye (yellow card) 80'	Report	Aziz Ki 6'; Lorch 12', (yellow card) 66'; Meijers (yellow card) 36'; Bakasu (yellow card) 52'	Stadium: El Bachir Stadium; Referee: Mohcine Sourdy

9 November 2025 8	OC Safi	1–2	Wydad AC	Safi
16:00 UTC+1	Hamiani (yellow card) 45+2'; El Moudane 81' (pen.)	Report	Lorch 26'; Amrabat 45+5' (pen.); Bakasu (yellow card) 62'; Sabbar (yellow card) 90+3'	Stadium: Stade El Massira; Referee: Amin El Maataoui

21 February 2026 13	Olympique Dcheira	0–5	Wydad AC	Agadir
22:00 UTC+0	Khafi (yellow card) 12'	Report	Ait Brayem 24' (o.g.); Sabbar 35'; Ziyech (yellow card) 45'; Amrabat 45+3'; Moufid (yellow card) 47'; Vaca 50', 90+3'	Stadium: Adrar Stadium; Referee: Mohamed El Baroudi

1 March 2026 14	Wydad AC	1–0	RS Berkane	Casablanca
22:00 UTC+0	Bakasu (yellow card) 45+3'; Aboulfath (yellow card) 90+6'; Hannouri 90+8' (pen.)	Report	Aabid (yellow card) 36'; Azri (yellow card) 90+6'	Stadium: Stade Mohammed V Referee: Azzeddine Boulfaid

4 March 2026 9	Wydad AC	1–2	AS FAR	Casablanca
22:00 UTC+0	Ziyech 28'	Report	Sabbar 19' (o.g.); El Fahli 62'	Stadium: Stade Mohammed V Referee: Mohamed Lahouidri

8 March 2026 15	Union de Touarga	3–4	Wydad AC	Rabat
22:00 UTC+0	Essahel 14'; Moustaghfir 16'; Zahouani 55'	Report	Ben Yedder 43'; Sabbar 78'; Hannouri 90+4'; Moussaddaq 90+6'	Stadium: Al Medina Stadium; Referee: Mohcine Sourdy

2026 10	Fath Union Sport	v	Wydad AC	Rabat
--:-- UTC+1				Stadium: Moulay El Hassan Stadium

2026 11	Wydad AC	v	Difaâ Hassani El Jadidi	Casablanca
--:-- UTC+1				Stadium: Stade Mohammed V

2026 12	Maghreb de Fès	v	Wydad AC	Fez
--:-- UTC+1				Stadium: Stade Hassan-II

2026 16	KAC Marrakech	v	Wydad AC	Marrakesh
--:-- UTC+1				Stadium: Marrakesh Stadium

2026 17	Wydad AC	v	US Yacoub El Mansour	Casablanca
--:-- UTC+1				Stadium: Stade Mohammed V

2026 18	RCA Zemamra	v	Wydad AC	Zemamra
--:-- UTC+1				Stadium: Stade Ahmed Choukri

2026 19	Wydad AC	v	COD Meknès	Casablanca
--:-- UTC+1				Stadium: Stade Mohammed V

2026 20	Raja CA	v	Wydad AC	Casablanca
--:-- UTC+1				Stadium: Stade Mohammed V

2026 21	Wydad AC	v	Hassania Agadir	Casablanca
--:-- UTC+1				Stadium: Stade Mohammed V

2026 22	Ittihad Tanger	v	Wydad AC	Tangier
--:-- UTC+1				Stadium: Stade du Village Sportif de Tanger

2026 23	Wydad AC	v	OC Safi	Casablanca
--:-- UTC+1				Stadium: Stade Mohammed V

2026 24	AS FAR	v	Wydad AC	Kenitra
--:-- UTC+1				Stadium: Kenitra Municipal Stadium

2026 25	Wydad AC	v	Fath Union Sport	Casablanca
--:-- UTC+1				Stadium: Stade Mohammed V

2026 26	Difaâ Hassani El Jadidi	v	Wydad AC	El Jadida
--:-- UTC+1				Stadium: Ben M'Hamed El Abdi Stadium

2026 27	Wydad AC	v	Maghreb de Fès	Casablanca
--:-- UTC+1				Stadium: Stade Mohammed V

2026 28	Wydad AC	v	Olympique Dcheira	Casablanca
--:-- UTC+1				Stadium: Stade Mohammed V

2026 29	RS Berkane	v	Wydad AC	Berkane
--:-- UTC+1				Stadium: Stade Municipal de Berkane

2026 30	Wydad AC	v	Union de Touarga	Casablanca
--:-- UTC+1				Stadium: Stade Mohammed V

=== Throne Cup ===
Win Draw Loss Fixtures

TBD 2026 Round of 32	Wydad AC	v	TBD
TBC --:-- UTC+1

=== Excellence Cup ===
==== Group stage ====
Win Draw Loss Fixtures

=== CAF Confederation Cup ===
Win Draw Loss Fixtures

==== Qualifying rounds ====
The draw of the qualifying rounds was held on 9 August 2025.

===== Second round =====
19 October 2025 First leg	Asante Kotoko (Ghana)	0–1	(Morocco) Wydad AC	Accra, Ghana
15:00 UTC+0	Camara (red card) 51'	Report	Bakasu 47'	Stadium: Accra Sports Stadium; Referee: Mohamed Buzin Koroma (Sierra Leone)

24 October 2025 Second leg	Wydad AC (Morocco)	5–1 (6–1 agg.)	(Ghana) Asante Kotoko	Casablanca, Morocco
20:00 UTC+1	Hannouri 1'; Aziz Ki 26'; Lorch 54' (pen.); Zemraoui 84'; Bouchouari 90+1'	Report	Gilbani 18'	Stadium: Stade Mohammed V Referee: Messie Nkounkou (Congo)

===== Group stage =====
The draw of the group stage was held on 3 November 2025.

====== Group B ======
Pos	Team	Pld	W	D	L	GF	GA	GD	Pts	Qualification	WAC	ASMU	AFC	NU
1	(Morocco) Wydad AC	6	5	0	1	9	2	+7	15	Advance to knockout stage	—	1–0	2–0	3–0
2	(Democratic Republic of the Congo) Maniema Union	6	4	0	2	8	3	+5	12	Advance to knockout stage	2–1	—	2–0	3–0
3	(Tanzania) Azam	6	3	0	3	4	6	−2	9		0–1	1–0	—	1–0
4	(Kenya) Nairobi United	6	0	0	6	1	11	−10	0		0–1	0–1	1–2	—

Source: CAF
Rules for classification: Group stage tiebreakers

23 November 2025 1	Wydad AC (Morocco)	3–0	(Kenya) Nairobi United	Casablanca, Morocco
20:00 UTC+1	Boucheta 3'; Bouchouari 44'; Nassi (yellow card) 84'; Rayhi 86'	Report	Mzee (yellow card) 72' (yellow-red card) 90+5'	Stadium: Larbi Zaouli Stadium; Referee: Alhadi Allaou Mahamat (Chad)

28 November 2025 2	Azam (Tanzania)	0–1	(Morocco) Wydad AC	Zanzibar City, Zanzibar
19:00 UTC+3		Report	Amrabat (yellow card) 15', (goal) 57'; Bouchouari (yellow card) 34'; Benabid (yellow card) 84'; Ferreira (yellow card) 90+5'	Stadium: Amaan Stadium; Referee: Antoine Effa (Cameroon)

25 January 2026 3	Wydad AC (Morocco)	1–0	(Democratic Republic of the Congo) Maniema Union	Casablanca, Morocco
20:00 UTC+1	Moufid 81'; Amrabat (yellow card) 90+4'	Report	Dieumerci (yellow card) 22'; Moanda (yellow card) 61'	Stadium: Stade Mohammed V Referee: Vincent Kaboré (Burkina Faso)

1 February 2026 4	Maniema Union (Democratic Republic of the Congo)	2–1	(Morocco) Wydad AC	Kinshasa, Democratic Republic of Congo
13:00 UTC+1	Mpindi (yellow card) 16'; Namboka 33'; Benabid 61' (o.g.); Ogundare (yellow card) 65'; Moanda (yellow card) 78'	Report	Bakasu (yellow card) 32'; Ferreira (yellow card) 45+2'; Hannouri 66' (pen.); Sabbar (yellow card) 90+3'	Stadium: Stade TP Mazembe; Referee: Mohamed Ali Moussa (Niger)

8 February 2026 5	Nairobi United (Kenya)	v	(Morocco) Wydad AC	Nairobi, Kenya
--:-- UTC+3				Stadium: Nyayo National Stadium

15 February 2026 6	Wydad AC (Morocco)	v	(Tanzania) Azam	Casablanca, Morocco
--:-- UTC+1				Stadium: Stade Mohammed V

== Squad statistics ==
=== Appearances and goals ===
No.	Pos	Nat	Player	Total		Botola		Throne Cup		Excellence Cup		CAF Confederation Cup	
No.	Pos	Nat	Player	Apps	Goals	Apps	Goals	Apps	Goals	Apps	Goals	Apps	Goals
Goalkeepers
1	GK	(Morocco) MAR	Abdelali Mhamdi	0	0	0	0	0	0	0	0	0	0
16	GK	(Morocco) MAR	Mehdi Benabid	4	0	4	0	0	0	0	0	0	0
	GK	(Morocco) MAR	Youssef El Motie	0	0	0	0	0	0	0	0	0	0
Defenders
2	DF	(Morocco) MAR	Mouhamed Moufid	4	1	4	1	0	0	0	0	0	0
4	DF	(Morocco) MAR	Amine Aboulfath	4	0	4	0	0	0	0	0	0	0
14	DF	(Brazil) BRA	Guilherme Ferreira	2	0	1+1	0	0	0	0	0	0	0
15	DF	(Morocco) MAR	Mohammed El Jadidi	1	0	0+1	0	0	0	0	0	0	0
22	DF	(Netherlands) NED	Bart Meijers	3	0	3	0	0	0	0	0	0	0
24	DF	(Morocco) MAR	Ayoub Boucheta	4	0	4	0	0	0	0	0	0	0
34	DF	(Belgium) BEL	Mohamed Bouchouari	2	0	0+2	0	0	0	0	0	0	0
Midfielders
3	MF	(South Africa) RSA	Thembinkosi Lorch	4	2	3+1	2	0	0	0	0	0	0
6	MF	(Morocco) MAR	Walid Sabbar	1	1	1	1	0	0	0	0	0	0
10	MF	(Brazil) BRA	Arthur	0	0	0	0	0	0	0	0	0	0
15	MF	(Morocco) MAR	Abdelghafour Lamirat	4	0	4	0	0	0	0	0	0	0
17	MF	(Morocco) MAR	Rayane Mahtou	1	0	0+1	0	0	0	0	0	0	0
23	MF	(Morocco) MAR	Oussama Zemraoui	4	0	3+1	0	0	0	0	0	0	0
25	MF	(Burkina Faso) BFA	Stephane Aziz Ki	4	0	3+1	0	0	0	0	0	0	0
27	MF	(Democratic Republic of the Congo) COD	Joseph Bakasu	4	1	2+2	1	0	0	0	0	0	0
33	MF	(Brazil) BRA	Pedrinho	0	0	0	0	0	0	0	0	0	0
	MF	(Morocco) MAR	Hamza Sakhi	0	0	0	0	0	0	0	0	0	0
Forwards
7	FW	(Morocco) MAR	Zouhair El Moutaraji	2	0	0+2	0	0	0	0	0	0	0
8	FW	(Netherlands) NED	Mohamed Rayhi	3	0	1+2	0	0	0	0	0	0	0
9	FW	(Botswana) BOT	Tumisang Orebonye	2	0	0+2	0	0	0	0	0	0	0
11	FW	(Morocco) MAR	Nordin Amrabat	4	0	4	0	0	0	0	0	0	0
19	FW	(Morocco) MAR	Hamza Hannouri	4	3	4	3	0	0	0	0	0	0
28	FW	(France) FRA	Walid Nassi	4	0	0+4	0	0	0	0	0	0	0

Last updated: 3 October 2025
Source: Soccerway

=== Goalscorers ===
As of 3 October 2025

Rank	No.	Pos.	Nat.	Name	Botola	Throne Cup	Excellence Cup	CAF Confederation Cup	Total
1	19	FW	(Morocco)	Hamza Hannouri	3	0	0	0	3
2	3	MF	(South Africa)	Thembinkosi Lorch	2	0	0	0	2
3	2	DF	(Morocco)	Mohamed Moufid	1	0	0	0	1
3	27	MF	(Democratic Republic of the Congo)	Joseph Bakasu	1	0	0	0	1
3	6	MF	(Morocco)	Walid Sabbar	1	0	0	0	1
Own goals					0	0	0	0	0
Totals					8	0	0	0	8

=== Assists ===
As of 3 October 2025

Rank	No.	Pos.	Nat.	Name	Botola	Throne Cup	Excellence Cup	CAF Confederation Cup	Total
1	2	DF	(Morocco)	Mohamed Moufid	3	0	0	0	3
2	3	MF	(South Africa)	Thembinkosi Lorch	1	0	0	0	1
2	19	FW	(Morocco)	Hamza Hannouri	1	0	0	0	1
2	23	MF	(Morocco)	Oussama Zemraoui	1	0	0	0	1
Totals					6	0	0	0	6

=== Clean sheets ===
As of 3 October 2025

Rank	No.	Pos.	Nat.	Name	Botola	Throne Cup	Excellence Cup	CAF Confederation Cup	Totals
1	16	GK	(Morocco)	Mehdi Benabid	1	0	0	0	1
2	1	GK	(Morocco)	Abdelali Mhamdi	0	0	0	0	0
Totals					1	0	0	0	1

=== Disciplinary record ===
As of 3 October 2025

No.	Pos.	Nat.	Player	Botola		Throne Cup		Excellence Cup		CAF Confederation Cup		Total	
No.	Pos.	Nat.	Player	Yellow card	Red card	Yellow card	Red card	Yellow card	Red card	Yellow card	Red card	Yellow card	Red card
2	DF	(Morocco)	Mohamed Moufid	1								1	
4	DF	(Morocco)	Amine Aboulfath	2								2	
11	FW	(Morocco)	Nordin Amrabat	1								1	
14	DF	(Brazil)	Guilherme Ferreira	1								1	
15	MF	(Morocco)	Abdelghafour Lamirat	1								1	
16	GK	(Morocco)	Mehdi Benabid	1								1	
19	FW	(Morocco)	Hamza Hannouri	1								1	
22	DF	(Netherlands)	Bart Meijers	1								1	
24	DF	(Morocco)	Ayoub Boucheta	1								1	
27	MF	(Democratic Republic of the Congo)	Joseph Bakasu	1								1	
Totals				11	0	0	0	0	0	0	0	11	0

== Club awards ==
=== Player of the Month award ===
Month	Player	Ref.
