= 2025 FIFA Club World Cup Group G =

Soccer tournament group stage

Group G was one of eight groups in the 2025 FIFA Club World Cup, an international club soccer tournament hosted in the United States and organized by FIFA. It comprised four teams: Manchester City of England; Wydad AC of Morocco; Al Ain of the United Arab Emirates; and Juventus of Italy. Teams qualified by winning the respective continental club championships of their confederation or through a ranking of their performance in competitions. Only two clubs per country were allowed to qualify unless three or four won their respective continental club championship. The 2025 edition of the FIFA Club World Cup was the first in the tournament's history to be played under its quadrennial format with 32 teams. The group's matches began on June 18 and concluded on June 26.

== Teams ==
The four teams in Group G were decided by the FIFA Club World Cup draw held by FIFA on December 5, 2024, in the Miami area. The 32 participants were divided into four pots based on their confederation and ranking within FIFA's club ranking system. Each of the eight groups would receive one team from each pot. Teams from the same confederation could not be drawn into the same group except for those from UEFA, which had twelve slots; teams from the same national association were not able to be drawn into the same group.

2025 FIFA Club World Cup Group G draw
Draw position	Team	Association	Pot	Confederation	Method of qualification	Date of qualification	Appearance	Last appearance	Previous best performance
G1	Manchester City	England	1	UEFA	Winners of the 2022–23 UEFA Champions League	June 10, 2023	2nd	2023	Winners (2023)
G2	Wydad AC	Morocco	3	CAF	Winners of the 2021–22 CAF Champions League	March 14, 2023 (Note: Qualification was confirmed on this date by FIFA.)	3rd	2022	Sixth place (2017), Second round (2022)
G3	Al Ain	United Arab Emirates	4	AFC	Winners of the 2023–24 AFC Champions League	May 25, 2024	2nd	2018	Runners-up (2018)
G4	Juventus	Italy	2	UEFA	UEFA four-year ranking (8th among eligible)	March 12, 2024	1st	—	—

== Standings ==
Pos	Team	Pld	W	D	L	GF	GA	GD	Pts	Qualification
1	(England) Manchester City	3	3	0	0	13	2	+11	9	Advance to knockout stage
2	(Italy) Juventus	3	2	0	1	11	6	+5	6	Advance to knockout stage
3	(United Arab Emirates) Al Ain	3	1	0	2	2	12	−10	3	
4	(Morocco) Wydad AC	3	0	0	3	2	8	−6	0	

Source: FIFA
Rules for classification: Group stage tiebreakers

In the round of 16:

- The winners of Group G, Manchester City, advanced to play the runners-up of Group H, Al-Hilal.
- The runners-up of Group G, Juventus, advanced to play the winners of Group H, Real Madrid.

== Matches ==
Matches took place from June 18 to 26. All times listed are local.

=== Manchester City vs Wydad AC ===
June 18, 2025
12:00 pm EDT

Manchester City (England)	2–0	(Morocco) Wydad AC
Foden 2'; Doku 42'	Report

Lincoln Financial Field, Philadelphia
Attendance: 37,446
Referee: Ramon Abatti (Brazil)

Manchester City	Wydad AC

GK	31	(Brazil) Ederson (c)
RB	82	(England) Rico Lewis	(red card) 88'
CB	22	(Brazil) Vitor Reis
CB	6	(Netherlands) Nathan Aké
LB	75	(England) Nico O'Reilly		(substituted off) 90+1'
RM	26	(Brazil) Savinho		(substituted off) 90+2'
CM	47	(England) Phil Foden		(substituted off) 59'
CM	4	(Netherlands) Tijjani Reijnders
LM	11	(Belgium) Jérémy Doku		(substituted off) 59'
CF	29	(France) Rayan Cherki		(substituted off) 59'
CF	7	(Egypt) Omar Marmoush		(substituted off) 68'
Substitutions:
FW	9	(Norway) Erling Haaland		(substituted in) 59'
MF	16	(Spain) Rodri		(substituted in) 59'
FW	52	(Norway) Oscar Bobb		(substituted in) 59'
MF	19	(Germany) İlkay Gündoğan		(substituted in) 68'
MF	27	(Portugal) Matheus Nunes		(substituted in) 90+2'
Manager:
(Spain) Pep Guardiola

GK	12	(Morocco) Mehdi Benabid
CB	72	(Brazil) Guilherme Ferreira
CB	14	(Morocco) Abdelmounaim Boutouil
CB	22	(Netherlands) Bart Meijers		(substituted off) 75'
RM	18	(Morocco) Fahd Moufi
CM	23	(Morocco) Oussama Zemraoui		(substituted off) 61'
CM	19	(Morocco) El Mehdi El Moubarik
LM	2	(Morocco) Mohamed Moufid
RF	11	(Morocco) Nordin Amrabat (c)		(substituted off) 61'
CF	21	(South Africa) Cassius Mailula	(yellow card) 16'	(substituted off) 46'
LF	4	(South Africa) Thembinkosi Lorch		(substituted off) 84'
Substitutions:
FW	8	(Netherlands) Mohamed Rayhi		(substituted in) 46'
MF	7	(Martinique) Mickaël Malsa		(substituted in) 61'
FW	9	(Ghana) Samuel Obeng		(substituted in) 61'
MF	5	(Morocco) Ismail Moutaraji		(substituted in) 75'
MF	25	(Burkina Faso) Stephane Aziz Ki		(substituted in) 84'
Manager:
(Morocco) Mohamed Amine Benhachem

Man of the Match:
Phil Foden (Manchester City)

Assistant referees:
Danilo Manis (Brazil)
Rafael Alves (Brazil)
Fourth official:
Ma Ning (China)
Video assistant referee:
Juan Soto (Venezuela)
Assistant video assistant referee:
Érick Miranda (Mexico)
Support video assistant referee:
Carlos del Cerro Grande (Spain)

=== Al Ain vs Juventus ===
June 18, 2025
9:00 pm EDT

Al Ain (United Arab Emirates)	0–5	(Italy) Juventus
	Report	Kolo Muani 11', 45+4'; Conceição 21', 58'; Yıldız 31'

Audi Field, Washington, D.C.
Attendance: 18,161
Referee: Tori Penso (United States)

Al Ain	Juventus

GK	1	(Portugal) Rui Patrício
CB	14	(Slovenia) Marcel Ratnik
CB	25	(Egypt) Ramy Rabia
CB	3	(United Arab Emirates) Kouame Autonne		(substituted off) 68'
RWB	70	(Mali) Abdoul Karim Traoré	(yellow card) 90+3'
LWB	36	(Argentina) Facundo Zabala
CM	10	(Paraguay) Kaku		(substituted off) 76'
CM	5	(South Korea) Park Yong-woo		(substituted off) 76'
CM	20	(Argentina) Matías Palacios		(substituted off) 68'
CF	9	(Togo) Kodjo Fo-Doh Laba (c)
CF	21	(Morocco) Soufiane Rahimi		(substituted off) 90+2'
Substitutions:
MF	6	(United Arab Emirates) Yahia Nader		(substituted in) 68'
DF	56	(Senegal) Amadou Niang		(substituted in) 68'
DF	97	(Austria) Adis Jašić		(substituted in) 76'
MF	28	(Morocco) Nassim Chadli		(substituted in) 76'
MF	80	(Nigeria) Joshua Udoh		(substituted in) 90+2'
Manager:
(Serbia) Vladimir Ivić

GK	29	(Italy) Michele Di Gregorio
CB	15	(France) Pierre Kalulu
CB	37	(Italy) Nicolò Savona		(substituted off) 70'
CB	6	(England) Lloyd Kelly
RM	2	(Portugal) Alberto Costa
CM	16	(United States) Weston McKennie (c)	(yellow card) 5'
CM	19	(France) Khéphren Thuram		(substituted off) 46'
LM	27	(Italy) Andrea Cambiaso	(yellow card) 16'	(substituted off) 46'
RF	7	(Portugal) Francisco Conceição	(yellow card) 60'
CF	20	(France) Randal Kolo Muani		(substituted off) 70'
LF	10	(Turkey) Kenan Yıldız		(substituted off) 62'
Substitutions:
MF	26	(Brazil) Douglas Luiz		(substituted in) 46'
FW	22	(United States) Timothy Weah		(substituted in) 46'
MF	8	(Netherlands) Teun Koopmeiners		(substituted in) 62'
FW	9	(Serbia) Dušan Vlahović		(substituted in) 70'
DF	4	(Italy) Federico Gatti	(yellow card) 82'	(substituted in) 70'
Manager:
(Croatia) Igor Tudor

Man of the Match:
Randal Kolo Muani (Juventus)

Assistant referees:
Brooke Mayo (United States)
Kathryn Nesbitt (United States)
Fourth official:
Jean-Jacques Ndala (DR Congo)
Video assistant referee:
Armando Villarreal (United States)
Assistant video assistant referee:
Guillermo Pacheco (Mexico)
Support video assistant referee:
Fu Ming (China)

=== Juventus vs Wydad AC ===
June 22, 2025
12:00 pm EDT

Juventus (Italy)	4–1	(Morocco) Wydad AC
Boutouil 6' (o.g.); Yıldız 16', 69'; Vlahović 90+4' (pen.)	Report	Lorch 25'

Lincoln Financial Field, Philadelphia
Attendance: 31,975
Referee: Saíd Martínez (Honduras)

Juventus	Wydad AC

GK	29	(Italy) Michele Di Gregorio
CB	15	(France) Pierre Kalulu
CB	37	(Italy) Nicolò Savona
CB	6	(England) Lloyd Kelly
RM	2	(Portugal) Alberto Costa		(substituted off) 72'
CM	16	(United States) Weston McKennie (c)		(substituted off) 46'
CM	19	(France) Khéphren Thuram	(yellow card) 77'
LM	27	(Italy) Andrea Cambiaso
RF	7	(Portugal) Francisco Conceição		(substituted off) 72'
CF	20	(France) Randal Kolo Muani		(substituted off) 72'
LF	10	(Turkey) Kenan Yıldız		(substituted off) 85'
Substitutions:
MF	8	(Netherlands) Teun Koopmeiners		(substituted in) 46'
MF	5	(Italy) Manuel Locatelli		(substituted in) 72'
FW	11	(Argentina) Nicolás González		(substituted in) 72'
FW	9	(Serbia) Dušan Vlahović		(substituted in) 72'
DF	4	(Italy) Federico Gatti		(substituted in) 85'
Manager:
(Croatia) Igor Tudor

GK	12	(Morocco) Mehdi Benabid
CB	72	(Brazil) Guilherme Ferreira	(yellow card) 51'
CB	14	(Morocco) Abdelmounaim Boutouil		(substituted off) 78'
CB	22	(Netherlands) Bart Meijers	(yellow card) 22'	(substituted off) 46'
RM	18	(Morocco) Fahd Moufi		(substituted off) 87'
CM	19	(Morocco) El Mehdi El Moubarik
CM	23	(Morocco) Oussama Zemraoui		(substituted off) 78'
LM	2	(Morocco) Mohamed Moufid
RF	11	(Morocco) Nordin Amrabat (c)
CF	9	(Ghana) Samuel Obeng		(substituted off) 46'
LF	4	(South Africa) Thembinkosi Lorch
Substitutions:
FW	26	(Tanzania) Selemani Mwalimu		(substituted in) 46'
FW	99	(Syria) Omar Al Somah		(substituted in) 46'
DF	16	(Morocco) Jamal Harkass		(substituted in) 78'
FW	21	(South Africa) Cassius Mailula		(substituted in) 78'
MF	25	(Burkina Faso) Stephane Aziz Ki		(substituted in) 87'
Manager:
(Morocco) Mohamed Amine Benhachem

Man of the Match:
Kenan Yıldız (Juventus)

Assistant referees:
Walter López (Honduras)
Christian Ramírez (Honduras)
Fourth official:
Ma Ning (China)
Video assistant referee:
Erick Miranda (Mexico)
Assistant video assistant referee:
Shaun Evans (Australia)
Support video assistant referee:
Khamis Al-Marri (Qatar)

=== Manchester City vs Al Ain ===
June 22, 2025
9:00 pm EDT

Manchester City (England)	6–0	(United Arab Emirates) Al Ain
Gündoğan 8', 73'; Echeverri 27'; Haaland 45+5' (pen.); Bobb 84'; Cherki 89'	Report

Mercedes-Benz Stadium, Atlanta
Attendance: 40,392
Referee: Mustapha Ghorbal (Algeria)

Manchester City	Al Ain

GK	18	(Germany) Stefan Ortega
CB	45	(Uzbekistan) Abdukodir Khusanov	(yellow card) 58'	(substituted off) 61'
CB	25	(Switzerland) Manuel Akanji
CB	24	(Croatia) Joško Gvardiol		(substituted off) 73'
RM	27	(Portugal) Matheus Nunes
CM	14	(Spain) Nico González		(substituted off) 61'
CM	19	(Germany) İlkay Gündoğan
LM	21	(Algeria) Rayan Aït-Nouri
RF	20	(Portugal) Bernardo Silva (c)		(substituted off) 73'
CF	9	(Norway) Erling Haaland
LF	30	(Argentina) Claudio Echeverri		(substituted off) 46'
Substitutions:
MF	47	(England) Phil Foden		(substituted in) 46'
FW	52	(Norway) Oscar Bobb		(substituted in) 61'
MF	16	(Spain) Rodri		(substituted in) 61'
MF	29	(France) Rayan Cherki		(substituted in) 73'
DF	3	(Portugal) Rúben Dias		(substituted in) 73'
Manager:
(Spain) Pep Guardiola

GK	17	(United Arab Emirates) Khalid Eisa (c)
CB	56	(Senegal) Amadou Niang
CB	5	(South Korea) Park Yong-woo
CB	25	(Egypt) Ramy Rabia	(yellow card) 45+4'
RWB	97	(Austria) Adis Jašić
LWB	36	(Argentina) Facundo Zabala	(yellow card) 25'	(substituted off) 62'
RM	28	(Morocco) Nassim Chadli		(substituted off) 74'
CM	6	(United Arab Emirates) Yahia Nader		(substituted off) 46'
CM	70	(Mali) Abdoul Karim Traoré
LM	8	(United Arab Emirates) Mohammed Abbas		(substituted off) 62'
CF	21	(Morocco) Soufiane Rahimi		(substituted off) 46'
Substitutions:
FW	9	(Togo) Kodjo Fo-Doh Laba		(substituted in) 46'
MF	20	(Argentina) Matías Palacios		(substituted in) 46'
FW	10	(Paraguay) Kaku		(substituted in) 62'
MF	15	(Brazil) Erik		(substituted in) 62'
MF	19	(Argentina) Mateo Sanabria		(substituted in) 74'
Manager:
(Serbia) Vladimir Ivić

Man of the Match:
İlkay Gündoğan (Manchester City)

Assistant referees:
Mokrane Gourari (Algeria)
Abbes Akram Zerhouni (Algeria)
Fourth official:
Alireza Faghani (Australia)
Video assistant referee:
Mahmoud Ashour (Egypt)
Assistant video assistant referee:
Leodán González (Uruguay)
Support video assistant referee:
Fu Ming (China)

=== Juventus vs Manchester City ===
June 26, 2025
3:00 pm EDT

Juventus (Italy)	2–5	(England) Manchester City
Koopmeiners 11'; Vlahović 84'	Report	Doku 9'; Kalulu 26' (o.g.); Haaland 52'; Foden 69'; Savinho 75'

Camping World Stadium, Orlando
Attendance: 54,320
Referee: Clément Turpin (France)

Juventus	Manchester City

GK	29	(Italy) Michele Di Gregorio
CB	15	(France) Pierre Kalulu	(yellow card) 64'
CB	37	(Italy) Nicolò Savona		(substituted off) 60'
CB	6	(England) Lloyd Kelly
RM	2	(Portugal) Alberto Costa		(substituted off) 57'
CM	5	(Italy) Manuel Locatelli (c)		(substituted off) 57'
CM	16	(United States) Weston McKennie		(substituted off) 83'
LM	18	(Serbia) Filip Kostić
RF	11	(Argentina) Nicolás González
CF	9	(Serbia) Dušan Vlahović
LF	8	(Netherlands) Teun Koopmeiners		(substituted off) 57'
Substitutions:
MF	19	(France) Khéphren Thuram		(substituted in) 57'
DF	27	(Italy) Andrea Cambiaso		(substituted in) 57'
FW	10	(Turkey) Kenan Yıldız		(substituted in) 57'
DF	4	(Italy) Federico Gatti		(substituted in) 60'
MF	17	(Montenegro) Vasilije Adžić		(substituted in) 83'
Manager:
(Croatia) Igor Tudor

GK	31	(Brazil) Ederson
RB	27	(Portugal) Matheus Nunes
CB	3	(Portugal) Rúben Dias
CB	25	(Switzerland) Manuel Akanji
LB	21	(Algeria) Rayan Aït-Nouri	(substituted off) 75'
DM	16	(Spain) Rodri	(substituted off) 66'
CM	20	(Portugal) Bernardo Silva (c)	(substituted off) 75'
CM	4	(Netherlands) Tijjani Reijnders
RF	26	(Brazil) Savinho
CF	7	(Egypt) Omar Marmoush	(substituted off) 46'
LF	11	(Belgium) Jérémy Doku	(substituted off) 66'
Substitutions:
FW	9	(Norway) Erling Haaland	(substituted in) 46'
MF	19	(Germany) İlkay Gündoğan	(substituted in) 66'
MF	47	(England) Phil Foden	(substituted in) 66'
MF	29	(France) Rayan Cherki	(substituted in) 75'
MF	75	(England) Nico O'Reilly	(substituted in) 75'
Manager:
(Spain) Pep Guardiola

Man of the Match:
Jérémy Doku (Manchester City)

Assistant referees:
Nicolas Danos (France)
Benjamin Pagès (France)
Fourth official:
István Kovács (Romania)
Video assistant referee:
Jérôme Brisard (France)
Assistant video assistant referee:
Hernán Mastrángelo (Argentina)
Support video assistant referee:
Armando Villarreal (United States)

=== Wydad AC vs Al Ain ===
June 26, 2025
3:00 pm EDT

Wydad AC (Morocco)	1–2	(United Arab Emirates) Al Ain
Mailula 4'	Report	Laba 45+1' (pen.); Kaku 50'

Audi Field, Washington, D.C.
Attendance: 10,785
Referee: Drew Fischer (Canada)

Wydad AC	Al Ain

GK	12	(Morocco) Mehdi Benabid
RB	2	(Morocco) Mohamed Moufid
CB	72	(Brazil) Guilherme Ferreira
CB	16	(Morocco) Jamal Harkass		(substituted off) 55'
LB	24	(Morocco) Ayoub Boucheta
CM	23	(Morocco) Oussama Zemraoui		(substituted off) 79'
CM	19	(Morocco) El Mehdi El Moubarik		(substituted off) 79'
RW	11	(Morocco) Nordin Amrabat (c)	(yellow card) 83'
AM	21	(South Africa) Cassius Mailula		(substituted off) 62'
LW	4	(South Africa) Thembinkosi Lorch
CF	99	(Syria) Omar Al Somah		(substituted off) 62'
Substitutions:
DF	22	(Netherlands) Bart Meijers		(substituted in) 55'
FW	26	(Tanzania) Selemani Mwalimu	(yellow card) 68'	(substituted in) 62'
FW	9	(Ghana) Samuel Obeng		(substituted in) 62'
MF	27	(Morocco) Ismael Benktib	(yellow card) 90+3'	(substituted in) 79'
MF	5	(Morocco) Ismail Moutaraji		(substituted in) 79'
Manager:
(Morocco) Mohamed Amine Benhachem

GK	1	(Portugal) Rui Patrício
CB	4	(Morocco) Yahya Ben Khaleq
CM	5	(South Korea) Park Yong-woo
CB	25	(Egypt) Ramy Rabia
RWB	97	(Austria) Adis Jašić		(substituted off) 64'
LWB	36	(Argentina) Facundo Zabala
CM	10	(Paraguay) Kaku		(substituted off) 64'
CM	70	(Mali) Abdoul Karim Traoré	(yellow card) 45+2'
CM	20	(Argentina) Matías Palacios	(yellow card) 10'	(substituted off) 90+3'
CF	9	(Togo) Kodjo Fo-Doh Laba (c)		(substituted off) 87'
CF	21	(Morocco) Soufiane Rahimi		(substituted off) 90+3'
Substitutions:
MF	28	(Morocco) Nassim Chadli		(substituted in) 64'
MF	8	(United Arab Emirates) Mohammed Abbas		(substituted in) 64'
MF	6	(United Arab Emirates) Yahia Nader		(substituted in) 87'
FW	13	(Morocco) Houssine Rahimi		(substituted in) 90+3'
DF	56	(Senegal) Amadou Niang		(substituted in) 90+3'
Manager:
(Serbia) Vladimir Ivić

Man of the Match:
Kodjo Fo-Doh Laba (Al Ain)

Assistant referees:
Micheal Barwegen (Canada)
Lyes Arfa (Canada)
Fourth official:
Juan Gabriel Benítez (Paraguay)
Video assistant referee:
Fu Ming (China)
Assistant video assistant referee:
Mahmoud Ashour (Egypt)
Support video assistant referee:
Juan Soto (Venezuela)

== Discipline ==
Fair play points would have been used as tiebreakers if the overall and head-to-head records of teams were tied. These were calculated based on yellow and red cards received in all group matches as follows:

- first yellow card: −1 point;
- indirect red card (second yellow card): −3 points;
- direct red card: −4 points;
- yellow card and direct red card: −5 points;

Only one of the above deductions was applied to a player in a single match.

Team	Match 1				Match 2				Match 3				Points
Team	Booked	(yellow card) (yellow-red card)	Sent off (straight red)	(yellow card) (red card)	Booked	(yellow card) (yellow-red card)	Sent off (straight red)	(yellow card) (red card)	Booked	(yellow card) (yellow-red card)	Sent off (straight red)	(yellow card) (red card)	Points
(England) Manchester City			1		1								−5
(United Arab Emirates) Al Ain	1				2				2				−5
(Italy) Juventus	4				1				1				−6
(Morocco) Wydad AC	1				2				3				−6
