= Guilherme Ferreira =

Guilherme Ferreira may refer to:

- Guilherme Ferreira (footballer, born 1991), full name Guilherme Filipe Salgado Ferreira, Portuguese left-back
- Guilherme Ferreira (footballer, born 1999), full name Guilherme Ferreira de Oliveira, Brazilian centre-back
- Negueba (born 1992), full name Guilherme Ferreira Pinto, Brazilian football winger

== See also ==
- Ferreira (surname)
