= Majd FC =

Emirati football club

نادي مجد لكرة القدم Majd FC
- Full name: Majd Football Club
- Founded: 2022; 4 years ago as Al Dhahra; 2024; 2 years ago as Majd
- Chairman: Hani Idris
- Manager: Eisa Al Ali
- League: UAE First Division
- 2024–25: 13st

Majd FC (Arabic: نادي مجد لكرة القدم) is an Emirati football club currently competing in the UAE First Division.

== History ==
The club was founded in 2022 and began playing in the UAE Third Division.It earned promotion to the Second Division in their first season in the league. In the 2023–24 season, the club was promoted to the UAE First Division League.

== Current squad ==
As of UAE First Division League:

Note: Flags indicate national team as defined under FIFA eligibility rules; some limited exceptions apply. Players may hold more than one non-FIFA nationality.

No.	Pos.	Nation	Player
1	GK	BIH	Vedad Alibašić
3	DF	UAE	Zayed Al-Shammari
5	DF	GHA	Samuel Amoako
7	FW	VEN	Abdulrahman Zabadani
8	MF	UAE	Hamdan Adel
11	DF	OMA	Hamad Al-Nuaimi
12	GK	UAE	Omair Al-Hammadi
14	DF	YEM	Hassan Bakhashween
15	MF	ARG	Patricio Ulises
19	MF	SRB	Andrija Radovanović

No.	Pos.	Nation	Player
20	MF	GHA	Desmond Abugah
22	DF	EGY	Saif Atef
23	MF	UAE	Abdulrahman Zamah
26	DF	CIV	Franck Elvis
29	FW	UAE	Abdullah Al-Hammadi
30	GK	SDN	Mohammed Abbas
33	FW	BRA	Pedrinho
36	GK	UAE	Nawaf Hussain
85	DF	UAE	Rashed Al-Mesmari
