= Pedrinho (footballer, born January 2004) =

Brazilian footballer (born 2004)

Personal information
- Full name: Pedro Henrique de Assis
- Date of birth: 1 January 2004 (age 22)
- Place of birth: São Paulo, Brazil
- Height: 1.72 m (5 ft 8 in)
- Position: Attacking midfielder

Team information
- Current team: Majd
- Number: 33

Youth career
- 2015–2024: Corinthians

Senior career*
Years	Team	Apps	(Gls)
2024	Corinthians	0	(0)
2024–2025	Wydad AC	12	(1)
2026–	Majd	0	(0)
- * Club domestic league appearances and goals as of 19 June 2025

Pedro Henrique de Assis (born 1 January 2004), simply known as Pedrinho, is a Brazilian professional footballer who plays as an attacking midfielder for Majd.

== Career ==
Pedrinho joined Corinthians' youth team at the age of 8, and completed his entire training process at the club. In 2024, he was one of the main names in the campaign for the title of the Copa SP de Futebol Jr. Without playing a single game for the professional team, he was released to Wydad AC on August 2024, signing a contract for three seasons.

In June 2025, Pedrinho was one of the 29 players designated by coach Mohamed Amine Benhachem to compete in the 2025 FIFA Club World Cup, alongside the compatriots Arthur and Guilherme Ferreira.

== Honours ==
Corinthians U20

- Copa São Paulo de Futebol Júnior: 2024
