= Mohamed Bouchouari =

Football player

Personal information
- Date of birth: 15 November 2000 (age 25)
- Place of birth: Dinant, Belgium
- Height: 1.70 m (5 ft 7 in)
- Position: Right-back

Team information
- Current team: NAC Breda
- Number: 17

Youth career
- Beerschot
- Zulte Waregem
- PSV
- Anderlecht

Senior career*
| Years | Team | Apps | (Gls) |
| 2019–2020 | Dudelange | 11 | (0) |
| 2020–2024 | Anderlecht | 1 | (0) |
| 2022-2024 | RSCA Futures | 24 | (2) |
| 2022–2023 | → Emmen (loan) | 26 | (1) |
| 2024–2025 | Rodez | 36 | (4) |
| 2025–2026 | Wydad AC | 14 | (0) |
| 2026– | NAC Breda | 4 | (1) |

International career
| 2017–2018 | Belgium U18 | 4 | (0) |
| 2018 | Belgium U19 | 4 | (0) |
- * Club domestic league appearances and goals as of 3 October 2026

Mohamed Bouchouari (Arabic: محمد بوشواري; born 15 November 2000) is a Belgian professional footballer who plays as a right-back for Dutch Eerste Divisie club NAC Breda.

== Club career ==
Bouchouari played youth football with Beerschot, Zulte Waregem, PSV Eindhoven and RSC Anderlecht. He played as a winger before adapting to play as a wing-back and then full-back. In June 2019 Bouchouari joined F91 Dudelange. He experienced playing in the UEFA Europa League for the Luxembourg side in the 2019–20 season before it was curtailed by the COVID-19 pandemic. He returned to and Anderlecht in December 2020 and signed a contract until June 2022. In February 2022 he renewed his contract until 2024. Playing for the Anderlecht U23 team in the Belgian First Division B he scored his first professional goal for RSCA Futures against SK Beveren in August 2022.

On transfer deadline day in September 2022 he joined Emmen of the Eredivisie on loan. Bouchouari scored his first goal in the Eredivisie as Emmen secured a 3–3 draw with champions AFC Ajax on 12 November 2022. He was awarded man in the match for his performance in the game, the third time he had received that honour for Emmen in his eighth game.

In July 2024, he signed for Rodez on a three-year contract.

On 27 August 2025, Bouchouari moved to Wydad AC in Morocco.

On 2 September 2026, Bouchouari joined NAC Breda on a four-year contract.

== International career ==
In 2018 Bouchouari represented Belgium at under-19 level.

== Personal life ==
Bouchouari is of Moroccan heritage.
