= Anas El Mahraoui =

Moroccan footballer (born 2001

Personal information
- Date of birth: 29 March 2001 (age 25)
- Place of birth: Salé, Morocco
- Height: 1.73 m (5 ft 8 in)
- Position: Centre-forward

Team information
- Current team: MAS (on loan from Akhmat Grozny)

Senior career*
| Years | Team | Apps | (Gls) |
| 2018–2019 | US Salé | | |
| 2019–2020 | Kénitra | | |
| 2020–2023 | US Salé | | |
| 2023–2025 | COD Meknès | 29 | (10) |
| 2025– | Akhmat Grozny | 4 | (0) |
| 2026 | → Orenburg (loan) | 2 | (0) |
| 2026– | → MAS (loan) | 0 | (0) |

International career^{‡}
| 2024 | Morocco U23 | 1 | (0) |
| 2025– | Morocco A' | 3 | (0) |
- * Club domestic league appearances and goals as of 3 May 2026 ‡ National team caps and goals as of 17 August 2025

Anas El Mahraoui (Arabic: أنس المهراوي; born 29 March 2001) is a Moroccan football player who plays as a centre-forward for MAS on loan from the Russian Premier League club Akhmat Grozny.

== Club career ==
On 2 September 2025, El Mahraoui signed a long-term contract with Russian Premier League club Akhmat Grozny. He made his RPL debut for Akhmat on 20 September 2025 in a game against Pari Nizhny Novgorod.

On 19 February 2026, El Mahraoui was loaned by Orenburg in the same league, with an option to buy. On 13 August 2026, he moved on a new season-long loan to MAS.

== International career ==
El Mahraoui represented Morocco at the 2024 African Nations Championship (played in 2025), which Morocco won.

== Honours ==
Morocco

- African Nations Championship: 2024.

== Career statistics ==
As of 3 May 2026

| Club | Season | League | | | Cup | | Other | | Total | |
| Club | Season | Division | Apps | Goals | Apps | Goals | Apps | Goals | Apps | Goals |
|---|---|---|---|---|---|---|---|---|---|---|
| COD Meknès | 2024–25 | Botola Pro | 29 | 10 | – | | 1 (Note: Appearance in Moroccan Excellence Cup) | 0 | 30 | 10 |
| Akhmat Grozny | 2025–26 | Russian Premier League | 4 | 0 | 1 | 0 | – | | 5 | 0 |
| Orenburg (loan) | 2025–26 | Russian Premier League | 2 | 0 | 1 | 0 | – | | 3 | 0 |
| Career total | | | 35 | 10 | 2 | 0 | 1 | 0 | 38 | 10 |
