= Walid Nassi =

French footballer (born 2000)

Personal information
- Full name: Walid Nassi Ouled Bentle
- Date of birth: 15 July 2000 (age 26)
- Place of birth: Le Blanc-Mesnil, France
- Height: 1.80 m (5 ft 11 in)
- Position: Winger

Team information
- Current team: Wydad AC
- Number: 28

Youth career
- 2005–2018: Blanc-Mesnil SF

Senior career*
Years	Team	Apps	(Gls)
2018–2019	Châteaudun		
2019–2020	Saint-Georges-sur-Eure	11	(5)
2020–2022	Stade Briochin II	7	(3)
2021–2022	Stade Briochin	31	(2)
2022	Dijon II	5	(2)
2022–2024	Dijon	51	(3)
2024–	Wydad AC	46	(4)
- * Club domestic league appearances and goals as of 16 June 2024

Walid Nassi Ouled Bentle (born 15 July 2000) is a French professional footballer who plays as a winger with Wydad AC.

== Club career ==
Nassi is a youth product of Blanc-Mesnil SF since the age of 5, before moving to the Régional 2 club Châteaudun in the French 7th division in 2018. The following season, he moved up to the Régional 1 with Saint-Georges-sur-Eure where he was the top scorer in a season shortened by the COVID-19 pandemic. He moved to the reserves of Stade Briochin for the 2020–21 season, but had limited play in the first season due to the pandemic. The following season, he broke into their first team after a COVID-19 outbreak in the squad forced them to play him. On 21 June 2022, he transferred to Dijon in the Ligue 2 signing a 3-year contract. He made his senior and professional debut with Dijon in a 3–1 Ligue 2 win over Saint-Étienne on 30 July 2022.

== Personal life ==
Born in France, Nassi is of Moroccan descent.
