= Nassim Chadli =

Footballer (born 2001)

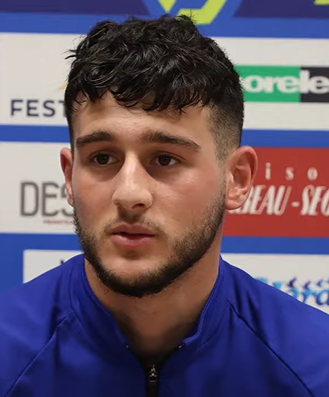

Personal information
- Date of birth: 28 July 2001 (age 25)
- Place of birth: Bagnols-sur-Cèze, France
- Height: 1.81 m (5 ft 11 in)
- Position: Winger

Team information
- Current team: Baniyas (on loan from Al Ain)
- Number: 70

Senior career*
Years	Team	Apps	(Gls)
2019–2020	Nîmes II	28	(4)
2021	Nîmes	3	(0)
2021–2023	Troyes II	10	(2)
2021–2023	Troyes	9	(0)
2022–2023	→ Lommel (loan)	15	(1)
2023–2024	Le Havre II	3	(0)
2023–2024	Le Havre	2	(0)
2023–2024	→ Concarneau (loan)	22	(3)
2024–2025	Wydad AC	12	(1)
2025–	→ Al-Jazira (loan)	9	(1)
2025–	Al Ain	11	(1)
2025–	→ Baniyas (loan)	1	(0)

International career^{‡}
2020	Morocco U23	2	(1)
- * Club domestic league appearances and goals as of 00:55, 17 August 2024 (UTC) ‡ National team caps and goals as of 15 August 2023

Nassim Chadli (born 28 July 2001) is a professional footballer who plays as a winger for Baniyas, on loan from Al Ain. Born in France, he represented Morocco at youth international level.

== Club career ==
Chadli made his professional debut with Nîmes in a 3–1 Coupe de France loss to Nice on 10 February 2021. On 4 May 2021, he was offered his first professional contract by Nîmes.

On 29 July 2022, Chadli was loaned to Lommel in Belgium.

In January 2023, Chadli joined Ligue 2 club Le Havre on a two-and-a-half-year contract.

== International career ==
Born in France, Chadli is of Moroccan descent. He was called up to represent the Morocco U20s in a pair of friendlies in October 2020.

== Personal life ==
Chadli is the nephew of the Moroccan international footballer Khalid Boutaïb.
