= Abdelghafour Lamirat =

Moroccan footballer (born 1997)

Personal information
- Full name: Abdelghafour Lamirat
- Date of birth: 26 August 1997 (age 29)
- Place of birth: Marrakesh, Morocco
- Height: 1.81 m (5 ft 11 in)
- Position: Midfielder

Team information
- Current team: Wydad AC
- Number: 15

Senior career*
Years	Team	Apps	(Gls)
2019–2021	Club Jeunesse Ben Guerir	10	(0)
2021–2025	Olympic Club Safi	32	(0)
2025–	Wydad AC		

International career^{‡}
2022–	Morocco A'	1	(0)
- * Club domestic league appearances and goals as of 27 July 2025 ‡ National team caps and goals as of 27 July 2025

Abdelghafour Lamirat (Arabic: عبد الغفور لعميرات; born 26 August 1997) is a Moroccan professional footballer who plays as a midfielder for Botola Pro club Wydad AC.

== Club career ==
=== Wydad AC ===
On 7 July 2025, Lamirat signed a three-year deal for Wydad AC.

== Honours ==
OC Safi

- Moroccan Throne Cup: 2023–24
