= Abdelali Mhamdi =

Moroccan footballer

Personal information
- Full name: Abdelali Gluja Mhamdi
- Date of birth: 29 November 1991 (age 34)
- Place of birth: Marrakesh, Morocco
- Height: 1.92 m (6 ft 4 in)
- Position: Goalkeeper

Team information
- Current team: Wydad AC
- Number: 12

Youth career
- Kawkab Marrakech

Senior career*
Years	Team	Apps	(Gls)
2012–2015	Kawkab Marrakech	40	(0)
2015–2019	RS Berkane	91	(0)
2019–2022	Abha	83	(0)
2022–2023	Maghreb de Fès	19	(0)
2023–2024	Al-Batin	30	(0)
2024–	Wydad AC	2	(0)
2025	→ Al-Batin (loan)	13	(0)

International career^{‡}
2017–	Morocco A'	3	(0)
Medal record
Representing Morocco
African Nations Championship
Winner	2018
- * Club domestic league appearances and goals as of 9 September 2022 ‡ National team caps and goals as of March 29, 2015

Abdelali Gluja Mhamdi (Arabic: عبدالعالي محمدي; born 29 November 1991) is a Moroccan professional footballer who plays as a goalkeeper for Wydad AC.

== Honours ==
RS Berkane

- Moroccan Throne Cup: 2018
- CAF Confederation Cup runner-up: 2018–19

Morocco

- African Nations Championship: 2018
