= Nabil Marmouk =

Association football player

Personal information
- Full name: Nabil Marmouk
- Date of birth: 19 March 1998 (age 28)
- Place of birth: Fez, Morocco
- Height: 1.88 m (6 ft 2 in)
- Position: Centre-back

Team information
- Current team: Wydad AC

Youth career
- MAS Fès

Senior career*
Years	Team	Apps	(Gls)
2019–2023	MAS Fès	81	(4)
2023–2024	Anorthosis Famagusta	25	(0)
2024–	Wydad AC	11	(1)
2025	→ Abha (loan)	14	(1)
- * Club domestic league appearances and goals as of 21 May 2024

Nabil Marmouk (Arabic: نبيل مرموك; born 19 March 1998) is a Moroccan professional footballer who plays as a centre-back for Wydad AC.

== Club career ==
=== MAS Fès ===
On 8 December 2020 he played his first professional match with MAS Fès, starting in the league against RS Berkane (draw, 0-0). On 16 May 2021 he scored his first league goal against RS Berkane (win, 2–0).

=== Anorthosis Famagusta ===
On 30 June 2023, it was officially announced that Marmouk had signed for Cyta Championship club, Anorthosis Famagusta on a free transfer from MAS Fès. The agreement will be activated after the medical examinations. On 12 July 2023, Anorthosis announced the formalization of the agreement with Marmouk until 2025.

=== Abha ===
On 1 February 2025, Marmouk joined Abha on loan.

== International career ==
On 28 July 2022, he was summoned by coach Hicham Dmii for a training camp with the Morocco A' team, appearing on a list of 23 players who will take part in the Islamic Solidarity Games in August 2022.

== Career statistics ==
As of match played 21 May 2024

Appearances and goals by club, season and competition
Club	Season	League			National Cup		Europe		Other		Total	
Club	Season	Division	Apps	Goals	Apps	Goals	Apps	Goals	Apps	Goals	Apps	Goals
MAS Fès	2020–21	Botola	29	3	—		—		—		29	3
MAS Fès	2021–22	Botola	25	0	—		—		—		25	0
MAS Fès	2022–23	Botola	27	1	—		—		—		27	1
MAS Fès	Total		81	4	—		—		—		81	4
Anorthosis	2023–24	Cyta Championship	25	0	3	1	—		—		28	1
Career total			106	4	3	1	0	0	0	0	109	5
