= El Mehdi El Moubarik =

Moroccan footballer (born 2001)

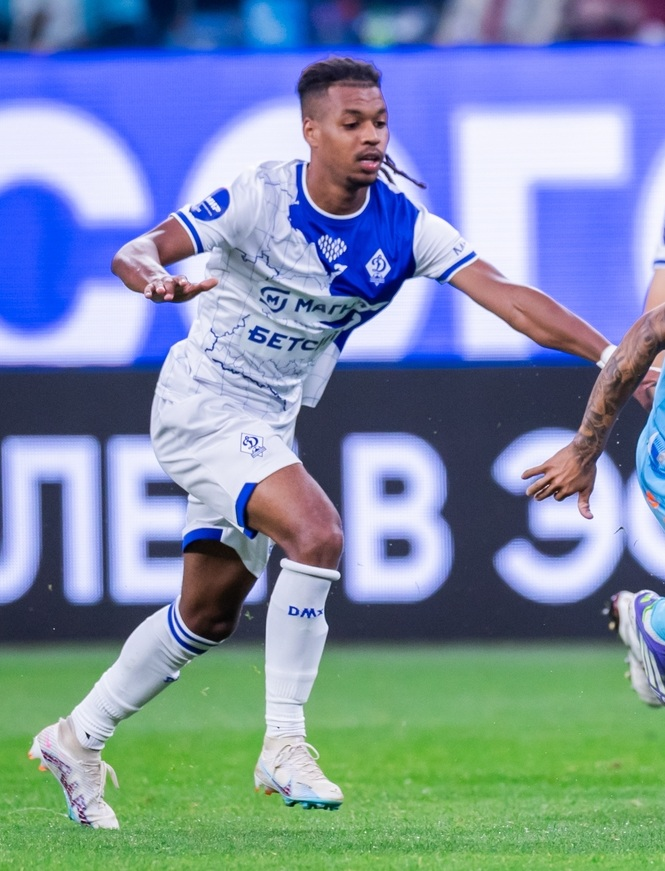
- El Moubarik with Dynamo Makhachkala in 2025

Personal information
- Full name: El Mehdi El Moubarik
- Date of birth: 22 January 2001 (age 25)
- Place of birth: Rabat, Morocco
- Height: 1.75 m (5 ft 9 in)
- Position: Midfielder

Team information
- Current team: Levski Sofia
- Number: 19

Youth career
- FUS Rabat

Senior career*
Years	Team	Apps	(Gls)
2019–2022	FUS Rabat	47	(0)
2022–2026	Al Ain	22	(0)
2023–2024	→ Raja CA (loan)	23	(0)
2024–2025	→ Wydad AC (loan)	20	(2)
2025–2026	→ Dynamo Makhachkala (loan)	20	(1)
2026–	Levski Sofia	12	(1)

International career^{‡}
2019–2021	Morocco U20	7	(2)
2022–2024	Morocco U23	5	(0)
Medal record
Representing Morocco
UNAF U-20 Tournament
Winner	2020 Tunisia
- * Club domestic league appearances and goals as of 22 November 2026 ‡ National team caps and goals as of 19 November 2024

El Mehdi El Moubarik (Arabic: المهدي مبارك; born 22 January 2001) is a Moroccan professional footballer who plays as a midfielder for Bulgarian First League club Levski Sofia.

== Club career ==
El Moubarik made his professional debut for FUS Rabat on 12 January 2020, coming on as a late substitute in the Botola game against Rapide Oued Zem.

On 6 August 2025, he joined Russian Premier League club Dynamo Makhachkala on loan from Al Ain.

On 30 June 2026, El Moubarik left Al-Ain to sign with Bulgarian First League club Levski Sofia on a 3-year deal.

== International career ==
El Moubarik was on the final list to participate in the 2020 UNAF U-20 Tournament qualifying for the 2021 Africa U-20 Cup of Nations and participated in all matches. El Moubarik reached the quarter-finals of the 2021 Africa U-20 Cup of Nations. He eventually was named in the best XI of the competition.

On 25 November 2021, he was called-up by Abdellah Idrissi to join the U23 team. On 15 September 2022, he was summoned by new coach Hicham Dmii with Olympic Morocco for a double confrontation against Senegal as part of a preparation course for qualifications for the 2024 Summer Olympics.

On 9 October 2023, Issam Charaï called on him to prepare for the two friendly confrontations against Iraq on October 12 and Dominican Republic four days later in Casablanca.

== Career statistics ==
As of 23 May 2026

Club	Season	League			Cup		Other		Total	
Club	Season	Division	Apps	Goals	Apps	Goals	Apps	Goals	Apps	Goals
FUS Rabat	2019–20	Botola Pro	3	0	–		–		3	0
FUS Rabat	2020–21	Botola Pro	21	0	1	0	–		22	0
FUS Rabat	2021–22	Botola Pro	23	0	2	0	–		25	0
FUS Rabat	Total		47	0	3	0	0	0	50	0
Al Ain	2022–23	UAE Pro League	22	0	6	0	6 (Note: Five appearances in UAE League Cup, one appearance in UAE Super Cup)	0	34	0
Raja CA (loan)	2023–24	Botola Pro	23	0	4	0	–		27	0
Wydad AC (loan)	2024–25	Botola Pro	20	2	2	0	3 (Note: Appearances in FIFA Club World Cup)	0	25	2
Dynamo Makhachkala (loan)	2025–26	Russian Premier League	20	1	5	1	2 (Note: Appearances in relegation play-offs)	0	27	2
Career total			132	3	20	1	11	0	163	4

== Honours ==
Raja CA

- Botola Pro: 2023–24
- Moroccan Throne Cup: 2022–23

Morocco U20

- UNAF U-20 Tournament: 2020

Individual

- Botola Young Player of the Season: 2020–21
- Africa U-20 Cup of Nations Best XI: 2021
