= Fahd Moufi =

French-Moroccan footballer (born 1996)

Personal information
- Full name: Fahd Moufi
- Date of birth: 5 May 1996 (age 30)
- Place of birth: Mulhouse, France
- Height: 1.79 m (5 ft 10 in)
- Position: Right-back

Team information
- Current team: Baltika Kaliningrad
- Number: 18

Youth career
- 2004–2013: Mulhouse
- 2013–2016: Lyon

Senior career*
Years	Team	Apps	(Gls)
2014–2017	Lyon II	55	(1)
2016–2017	→ Sedan (loan)	19	(0)
2017–2020	Tondela	41	(1)
2020–2023	Portimonense	88	(2)
2023–2025	Hajduk Split	33	(0)
2025	Wydad Casablanca	11	(0)
2025–2026	Orenburg	24	(1)
2026–	Baltika Kaliningrad	10	(0)

International career^{‡}
2013	Morocco U17	1	(0)
2015	Morocco U20	1	(0)
2017	Morocco U23	3	(0)
- * Club domestic league appearances and goals as of 21 November 2026 ‡ National team caps and goals as of 13:41, 9 July 2021 (UTC)

Fahd Moufi (Arabic: فهد موفي; born 5 May 1996) is a professional footballer who plays as a right-back for Russian club Baltika Kaliningrad. Born in France, he represented Morocco at international youth levels.

== Club career ==
Moufi moved from the academy of Mulhouse to Olympique Lyonnais in 2013, and signed his first professional contract with them on 17 February 2016.

He spent a season on loan with Sedan, before signing with Tondela on 17 July 2017. Moufi made his professional debut for Tondela in a 2–1 Primeira Liga loss to Braga on 24 September 2017, getting a red card in the 4th minute.

On 29 September 2020, Moufi joined Portimonense on a three-year deal.

In July 2023, Moufi's contract with Portimonense expired, and he signed a three-year deal (with an option of a 4th year) with Croatian side Hajduk Split.

On 9 August 2025, Moufi signed with Russian Premier League club Orenburg.

On 16 June 2026, Moufi moved to Baltika Kaliningrad in the same league, on a two-season contract.

== International career ==
Moufi represented the Morocco U17s at the 2013 African U-17 Championship. He represented the Morocco U20s at a youth tournament in China in 2015.

Moufi was called up to the Morocco U23 national team for a friendly in June 2016, but was kicked out of the team for getting caught smoking hookah with some teammates. He was re-called into the team, and made three appearances at the 2017 Islamic Solidarity Games for the Morocco U23s.

== Career statistics ==
=== Club ===
As of match played 21 November 2026

Club	Season	League			National Cup		League Cup		Continental		Other		Total	
Club	Season	Division	Apps	Goals	Apps	Goals	Apps	Goals	Apps	Goals	Apps	Goals	Apps	Goals
Sedan (loan)	2016–17	Championnat National	19	0	1	0	0	0	—		—		20	0
Tondela	2017–18	Primeira Liga	2	0	1	0	0	0	—		—		3	0
Tondela	2018–19	Primeira Liga	13	1	1	0	2	0	—		—		16	1
Tondela	2019–20	Primeira Liga	26	0	1	0	1	0	—		—		28	0
Tondela	Total		41	1	3	0	3	0	—		—		47	1
Portimonense	2020–21	Primeira Liga	26	0	0	0	0	0	—		—		26	0
Portimonense	2021–22	Primeira Liga	31	1	4	0	2	0	—		—		37	1
Portimonense	2022–23	Primeira Liga	31	1	1	0	1	0	—		—		33	1
Portimonense	Total		88	2	5	0	3	0	—		—		96	2
Hajduk Split	2023–24	Prva HNL	28	0	3	0	—		2 (Note: Appearances in UEFA Conference League)	0	1 (Note: Appearance in Croatian Football Super Cup)	0	34	0
Hajduk Split	2024–25	Prva HNL	5	0	1	0	—		4	0	—		10	0
Hajduk Split	Total		33	0	4	0	0	0	6	0	1	0	44	0
Wydad	2024–25	Botola	11	0	2	0	—		—		2 (Note: Appearances in FIFA Club World Cup)	0	15	0
Orenburg	2025–26	Russian Premier League	24	1	1	0	—		—		—		25	1
Baltika Kaliningrad	2026–27	Russian Premier League	10	0	4	0	—		—		—		14	0
Career total			226	4	20	0	6	0	6	0	3	0	261	4
