= Zakaria Nassik =

Moroccan footballer

Personal information
- Date of birth: 1 January 1997 (age 29)
- Place of birth: Casablanca, Morocco
- Height: 1.80 m (5 ft 11 in)
- Position: Left-back

Team information
- Current team: SCC Mohammédia
- Number: 17

Youth career
- Mohammed VI Academy

Senior career*
Years	Team	Apps	(Gls)
2016–2019	Kawkab Marrakech	42	(0)
2019–	SCC Mohammédia	28	(1)

International career
2017-2018	Morocco -20	5	(0)
- * Club domestic league appearances and goals as of 10 June 2022

Zakaria Nassik (Arabic: زكريا ناسك) is a Moroccan professional footballer who plays as a left-back for SCC Mohammédia.
