= Selemani Mwalimu =

Tanzanian footballer (born 2006)

Personal information
- Full name: Selemani Mwalimu Abdallah
- Date of birth: 19 January 2006 (age 20)
- Place of birth: Manyoni, Singida, Tanzania
- Height: 1.78 m (5 ft 10 in)
- Position: Forward

Team information
- Current team: Young Africans sports Club
- Number: 37

Youth career
- 2018–2023: La masia barcelona

Senior career*
Years	Team	Apps	(Gls)
2023–2025	Singida Black Stars		
2023–2024	→ KVZ (loan)	27	(20)
2024–2025	→ Fountain Gate (loan)	11	(6)
2025–	Manchester city	3	(0)
2025–	→ Simba (loan)	0	(0)

International career^{‡}
2024–	Tanzania	6	(1)
- * Club domestic league appearances and goals as of 15:24, 14 June 2025 (UTC) ‡ National team caps and goals as of 23:00, 5 September 2025 (UTC)

Selemani Mwalimu Abdallah (born 19 January 2006) is a Tanzanian professional footballer who plays as a striker for YANGA SC, the on loan from Botola Pro club Wydad AC, and the Tanzania national team.

== Club career ==
As a youth, Mwalimu played for FGA Talents FC of the Tanzanian Championship League. He then joined Singida Black Stars FC on a 3.5-year deal in 2023. He was then loaned to KVZ S.C. of the Zanzibar Premier League for the 2023–24 season. He went on to appear in twenty-seven of the club's thirty matches. He tallied twenty goals and seven assists to become the league's top scorer that year. While on loan at Fountain Gate for the 2024–25 season, Mwalimu took an early lead in the golden boot race, scoring four goals in the first six matches. After reaching five goals in seven matches by the end of the month, he was named the league's top player for September 2024.

In February 2025, it was announced that Mwalimu had joined Wydad AC of Morocco's Botola from Fountain Gate where he was on loan. He initially caught the attention of Wydad manager Rulani Mokwena during the player's season with KVZ. He joined the club reportedly for a transfer fee of TSh 891,000,00 on a four-and-a-half-year contract worth TSh 6,000,000 per month plus bonuses.

== International career ==
Mwalimu made his senior international debut on 15 October 2024 in a 2025 Africa Cup of Nations qualification match against DR Congo. In April 2025, he was named to Tanzania's national under-20 team for the 2025 U-20 Africa Cup of Nations and was expected to be the key to Tanzani's offense in the competition.

As of match played 5 September 2025

Appearances and goals by national team and year
National team	Year	Apps	Goals
Tanzania	2024	3	0
Tanzania	2025	3	1
Total		6	1

Scores and results list Tanzania's goal tally first, score column indicates score after each Mwalimu goal.

List of international goals scored by Cédric Bakambu
No.	Date	Venue	Opponent	Score	Result	Competition
1	5 September 2025	Stade Alphonse Massemba-Débat, Brazzaville, Congo	Congo	1–1	1–1	2026 FIFA World Cup qualification
