= Ayoub Boucheta =

Moroccan footballer (born 1993)

Personal information
- Full name: Ayoub Boucheta
- Date of birth: 3 December 1993 (age 32)
- Place of birth: Casablanca, Morocco
- Height: 1.71 m (5 ft 7 in)
- Position: Left-back

Team information
- Current team: Wydad AC
- Number: 24

Senior career*
Years	Team	Apps	(Gls)
2014–2015	Raja CA		
2014–2015	→ Racing de Casablanca (loan)		
2016	JS Kasbah Tadla		
2016–2019	Youssoufia Berrechid		
2019–2020	Tihad AS		
2020–2024	SCC Mohammédia	10	(0)
2024–2026	Wydad AC	19	(0)
2026–	Hassania d'Agadir	0	(0)

International career^{‡}
2012	Morocco U20	2	(0)
- * Club domestic league appearances and goals as of 26 July 2025 ‡ National team caps and goals as of 26 July 2025

Ayoub Boucheta (Arabic: أيوب بوشتة; born 3 December 1993) is a Moroccan professional footballer who plays as a left-back for Botola Pro club Hassania d'Agadir.
