= Oussama Zemraoui =

Moroccan footballer (born 2002)

Personal information
- Full name: Oussama Zemraoui
- Date of birth: 3 January 2002 (age 24)
- Place of birth: Casablanca, Morocco
- Height: 1.75 m (5 ft 9 in)
- Position: Midfielder

Team information
- Current team: Wydad AC
- Number: 23

Senior career*
Years	Team	Apps	(Gls)
2020–2024	SCC Mohammédia	43	(4)
2024–	Wydad AC	23	(5)

International career^{‡}
2019	Morocco U17	1	(0)
2021	Morocco U20	6	(0)
2023–	Morocco U23		
- * Club domestic league appearances and goals as of 26 July 2025 ‡ National team caps and goals as of 26 July 2025

Oussama Zemraoui (Arabic: أسامة الزمراوي; born 3 January 2002) is a Moroccan professional footballer who plays as a midfielder for Botola Pro club Wydad AC.

== Club career ==
=== Wydad AC ===
On 22 January 2024, Wydad announced the signing of Zemraoui from SCC Mohammédia.

On 29 November 2024, he scored his first goal for the team, giving the Reds a 1–0 win.

== International career ==
On 23 April 2024, Zemraoui was selected for the Morocco's under-23 squad for a training camp, as part the of preparations for 2024 Olympic Games.
