= Mohamed Moufid =

Moroccan footballer (born 2000)

Personal information
- Date of birth: 12 January 2000 (age 26)
- Place of birth: Rabat, Morocco
- Height: 1.72 m (5 ft 8 in)
- Position: Right-back

Team information
- Current team: Wydad AC

Senior career*
Years	Team	Apps	(Gls)
2019–2024	AS FAR	115	(1)
2024–	Wydad AC	0	(0)

International career^{‡}
2025–	Morocco	9	(0)
Medal record
Representing Morocco
Men's football
FIFA Arab Cup
Winner	2025 Qatar	Team
- * Club domestic league appearances and goals as of 24 July 2024 ‡ National team caps and goals as of 24 July 2024

Mohamed Moufid (Arabic: محمد مفيد; born 12 January 2000) is a Moroccan professional footballer who plays as a right-back for Wydad AC and the Morocco national team.

== Club career ==
Moufid joined the AS FAR youth academy at a young age. He made his first senior start in the Moroccan league on 10 August 2020 in a 1–1 draw against Difaâ El Jadidi. On 16 October 2021, during the 2021–22 CAF Confederation Cup, he scored an own goal against JS Kabylie in a 1–0 defeat.

== International career ==
On 5 June 2021, Moufid was called up by coach Houcine Ammouta to join the Morocco A' squad for a training camp in Maamora.

On 28 July 2022, he was called up by coach Hicham Dmii for a training camp with the Morocco A' team as part of preparations for the Islamic Solidarity Games in August 2022.

== Honours ==
=== Morocco ===
- African Nations Championship: 2024
- FIFA Arab Cup: 2025

=== AS FAR ===
- Botola: 2022–23
- Moroccan Throne Cup: 2020; runner-up: 2023
