= Bart Meijers =

Dutch footballer (born 1997)

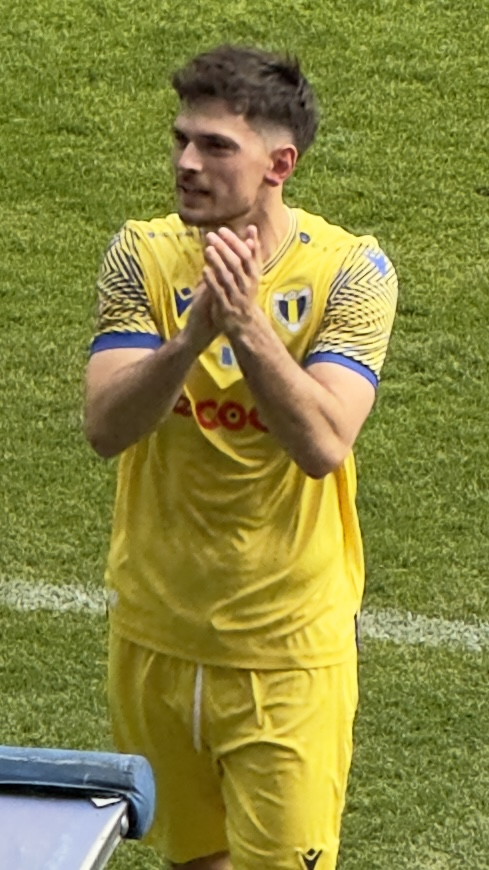
- Meijers with Petrolul Ploiești in 2024

Personal information
- Full name: Bart Adrianus Johannes Meijers
- Date of birth: 10 January 1997 (age 29)
- Place of birth: Breda, Netherlands
- Height: 1.85 m (6 ft 1 in)
- Position: Centre-back

Team information
- Current team: Borac Banja Luka
- Number: 2

Youth career
- Unitas '30
- –2011: RBC
- 2011–2015: NAC Breda

Senior career*
Years	Team	Apps	(Gls)
2015–2019	NAC Breda	22	(1)
2018–2019	→ Helmond Sport (loan)	34	(2)
2019–2020	Almere City	9	(1)
2020–2024	Petrolul Ploiești	110	(2)
2024–2025	Borac Banja Luka	28	(0)
2025–2026	Wydad	7	(0)
2026–	Borac Banja Luka	3	(0)
- * Club domestic league appearances and goals as of 12 September 2026

Bart Adrianus Johannes Meijers (born 10 January 1997) is a Dutch professional footballer who plays as a centre-back for Bosnian Premier League club Borac Banja Luka.

Meijers started out as a senior at his hometown club NAC Breda in 2017, and also represented Helmond Sport and Almere City in the Netherlands before moving to Romanian side Petrolul Ploiești in 2020. In 2024, he signed with Bosnian club Borac Banja Luka. A year later, he transferred to Moroccan team Wydad ahead of the FIFA Club World Cup.

== Career ==
=== Netherlands ===
Meijers grew up in Etten-Leur and spent his junior years in the academies of Unitas '30, RBC and NAC Breda. He made his professional debut for the latter in a 1–0 Eerste Divisie win over Volendam, on 24 February 2017. On 13 March that year, he scored his first goal in a 2–0 league defeat of Fortuna Sittard. He amassed 13 matches during his first season as a senior, as NAC obtained Eredivisie promotion via play-offs.

On 21 October 2017, Meijers recorded his top division debut by coming on as an 18th-minute substitute for Pablo Marí in a 0–2 home loss to PEC Zwolle. He made 13 appearances during the 2017–18 campaign, of which 11 as a starter. Meijers spent the next year on loan at Eerste Divisie club Helmond Sport, and in August 2019 joined fellow league side Almere City as a free agent on a one-year contract.

=== Petrolul Ploiești ===
On 27 August 2020, Meijers moved abroad for the first time by signing for Romanian Liga II team Petrolul Ploiești. In the 2021–22 season, he played 18 matches to aid Petrolul in winning the second league championship and thus promoting to the Liga I.

Meijers made his debut in the Romanian top tier by starting in a 0–1 home loss to Voluntari, on 18 July 2022. He scored his first goal in the competition on 2 December that year, opening the scoring with a header in a 2–0 home win over Universitatea Cluj. He was an undisputed starter during the season, totalling 38 league matches after only missing one through a suspension.

=== Borac Banja Luka ===
In July 2024, Meijers joined Bosnian side Borac Banja Luka. He made his debut on 10 July in a 1–0 win over Egnatia during the Champions League first qualifying round. A month later, on 15 August, he scored his first goal in extra time, sealing a 3–1 victory over KÍ Klaksvík in the Europa League third qualifying round.

=== Wydad ===
In June 2025, Meijers signed for Moroccan club Wydad ahead of the 2025 FIFA Club World Cup.

== Career statistics ==
=== Club ===
As of match played 12 September 2026

Appearances and goals by club, season and competition
Club	Season	League			National cup (Note: Includes KNVB Cup, Cupa României, Bosnian Cup)		Continental		Other		Total	
Club	Season	Division	Apps	Goals	Apps	Goals	Apps	Goals	Apps	Goals	Apps	Goals
NAC Breda
NAC Breda	2016–17	Eerste Divisie	9	1	0	0	—		4 (Note: Appearances in Eredivisie promotion play-offs)	0	13	1
NAC Breda	2017–18	Eredivisie	13	0	0	0	—		—		13	0
NAC Breda	Total		22	1	0	0	—		4	0	26	1
Helmond Sport (loan)	2018–19	Eerste Divisie	34	2	1	0	—		—		35	2
Almere City	2019–20	Eerste Divisie	9	1	1	0	—		—		10	1
Petrolul Ploiești
Petrolul Ploiești	2020–21	Liga II	21	1	2	0	—		—		23	1
Petrolul Ploiești	2021–22	Liga II	18	0	0	0	—		—		18	0
Petrolul Ploiești	2022–23	Liga I	38	1	3	0	—		—		41	1
Petrolul Ploiești	2023–24	Liga I	33	0	2	0	—		—		35	0
Petrolul Ploiești	Total		110	2	7	0	—		—		117	2
Borac Banja Luka	2024–25	Bosnian Premier League	28	0	4	0	18 (Note: Four appearances in UEFA Champions League, four appearances and two goals in UEFA Europa League, ten appearances in UEFA Conference League)	2	1 (Note: Appearance in Bosnian Supercup)	0	51	2
Wydad AC	2024–25	Botola Pro	—		—		—		3 (Note: Appearances in FIFA Club World Cup)	0	3	0
Wydad AC	2025–26	Botola Pro	7	0	—		1 (Note: Appearances in CAF Confederation Cup)	0	—		8	0
Wydad AC	Total		7	0	—		1	0	3	0	11	0
Borac Banja Luka	2026–27	Bosnian Premier League	3	0	0	0	5 (Note: Appearances in UEFA Conference League)	0	0	0	8	0
Career total			213	6	13	0	24	2	8	0	258	8

== Honours ==
Petrolul Ploiești

- Liga II: 2021–22

Borac Banja Luka

- Bosnian Supercup runner-up: 2024
