= Ismael Benktib =

Moroccan footballer (born 1998)

Personal information
- Full name: Ismael Benktib Hajjaj
- Date of birth: 4 July 1998 (age 28)
- Place of birth: L'Ametlla del Vallès, Spain
- Height: 1.77 m (5 ft 10 in)
- Position: Central midfielder

Team information
- Current team: Wydad AC
- Number: 27

Youth career
- Girona
- 2014–2017: Elche

Senior career*
Years	Team	Apps	(Gls)
2015–2018	Elche B	26	(2)
2017–2018	Elche	7	(0)
2018–2019	Recreativo	0	(0)
2019–2020	Levante B	6	(0)
2020	Elche B	6	(0)
2020–2021	Racing Santander	4	(0)
2021–2022	MAS Fez	19	(1)
2022–2024	SCC Mohammédia	57	(2)
2024–	Wydad AC	4	(0)
2025	→ Moghreb Tétouan (loan)	12	(1)

International career
2016–2017	Morocco U20	10	(1)
2018	Morocco U23	1	(0)
- * Club domestic league appearances and goals as of 20:59, 18 June 2025 (UTC)

Ismael Benktib (born 4 July 1998) is a professional footballer who plays for Wydad AC as a central midfielder. Born in Spain, he represented Morocco at youth international levels.

== Club career ==
Born in L'Ametlla del Vallès, Barcelona, Catalonia, Benktib joined Elche CF's youth setup in 2014, from Girona FC. He made his senior debut with the reserves on 23 August 2015, starting in a 1–0 Tercera División away win against FC Jove Español.

On 7 June 2016, Benktib renewed his contract with the club. He made his first-team debut on 10 September of the following year, coming on as a late substitute for Juan José Collantes in a 4–1 home routing of CF Peralada-Girona B in the Segunda División B championship.

On 29 May 2018, Elche announced that Benktib's contract was extended until 2021, after exercising the automatic renewal option in his previous deal; the club also announced that he would become a permanent member of the main squad in the 2018–19 campaign. Four days later, however, his agent stated that his contract would only be renewed for one further year if the club achieved promotion to Segunda División; Elche later denied the claims.

In September 2018, Benktib started training with Recreativo de Huelva and signed a contract with the club afterwards. Elche later took a legal action against the player due to a "breach of contract", which the federation dismissed; he was registered by his new club in October.

On 23 January 2019, after not playing a single minute with Recreativo, Benktib joined Levante UD's B-team, also in the third division. Roughly one year later, after again featuring rarely, he terminated his contract and returned to Elche, being again assigned to their reserve side.

On 17 August 2020, Benktib agreed to a two-year contract with Racing de Santander, recently relegated to the division three. He left the club the following 4 February with only four matches, and was transferred to Moroccan side Maghreb de Fez.

On 1 February 2022, Benktib signed a two-year contract with Botola Pro side SCC Mohammédia. He immediately became a regular starter for his new side, before moving to Wydad AC on 29 August 2024.

Rarely used, Benktib joined MA Tétouan on loan on 31 January 2025, but returned to Wydad in may for the 2025 FIFA Club World Cup.
