= Guilherme Ferreira (footballer, born 1999) =

Brazilian footballer

Personal information
- Full name: Guilherme Ferreira de Oliveira
- Date of birth: 2 December 1999 (age 26)
- Place of birth: Dores do Indaiá, Brazil
- Height: 1.94 m (6 ft 4 in)
- Position: Centre-back

Team information
- Current team: Wydad AC (on loan from Felgueiras)
- Number: 72

Youth career
- –2016: América Mineiro
- 2016–2018: Cruzeiro
- 2019: América Mineiro

Senior career*
Years	Team	Apps	(Gls)
2019–2020	Guarani-MG	9	(0)
2019	→ América Mineiro (loan)	0	(0)
2021–2022	Pedras Salgadas	17	(2)
2022–2025	Chaves	0	(0)
2022–2023	→ Fafe (loan)	20	(2)
2023–2024	→ Feirense (loan)	20	(1)
2024–2025	→ Felgueiras (loan)	20	(2)
2025–	Felgueiras	0	(0)
2025–	→ Wydad AC (loan)	0	(0)
- * Club domestic league appearances and goals as of 19 June 2025

Guilherme Ferreira de Oliveira (born 2 December 1999), better known as Guilherme Ferreira, is a Brazilian professional footballer who plays as a centre-back for Wydad AC, on loan from Felgueiras.

== Career ==
Born in Dores do Indaiá, Ferreira played in the youth sectors of América Mineiro and Cruzeiro. In 2019, he turned professional playing for Guarani from Divinópolis. In 2021, he was hired by Pedras Salgadas, which was competing in the Campeonato de Portugal (fourth tier), being promoted the following season to Chaves, where he was not used and re-loaned to Fafe, Feirense and Felgueiras. After a good performance in the 2024–25 Liga Portugal 2 season, Ferreira was acquired permanently by Felgueiras.

In June 2025, Ferreira was loaned to Wydad AC as a reinforcement for the 2025 FIFA Club World Cup dispute, joining the compatriots Arthur and Pedrinho.
