= Mohamed Rayhi =

Dutch footballer (born 1994)

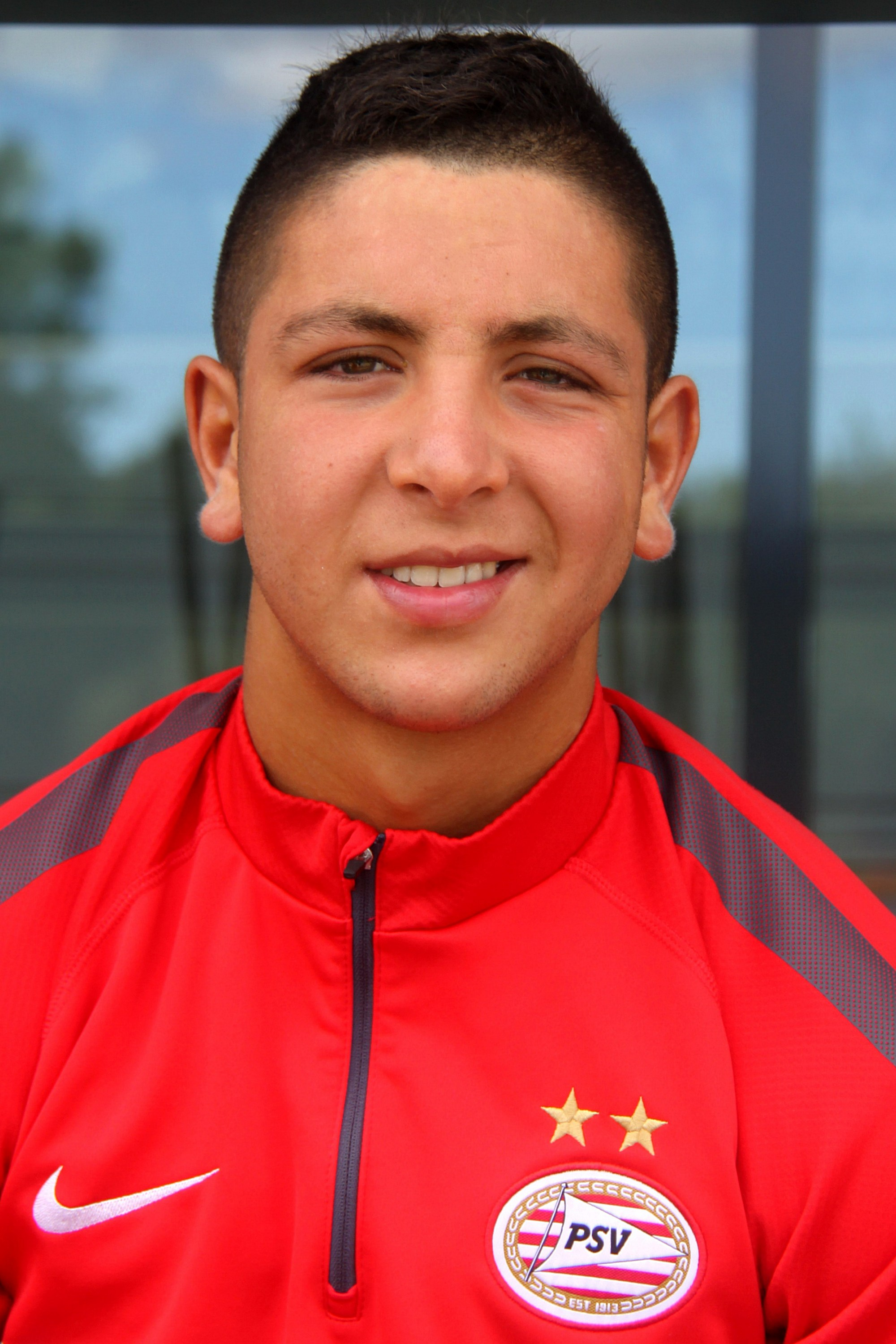
- Rayhi with PSV in 2014

Personal information
- Full name: Mohamed Rayhi
- Date of birth: 1 July 1994 (age 32)
- Place of birth: Eindhoven, Netherlands
- Height: 1.78 m (5 ft 10 in)
- Position: Left winger

Team information
- Current team: Wydad
- Number: 8

Youth career
- WVVZ
- 2003–2013: PSV
- 2009–2010: → Helmond Sport (loan)

Senior career*
Years	Team	Apps	(Gls)
2013–2015	Jong PSV	48	(10)
2015–2018	NEC	60	(9)
2018–2020	Sparta Rotterdam	57	(20)
2020–2022	Al Batin	54	(11)
2022–2023	Al Dhafra	24	(1)
2023–2024	Al Jabalain	34	(8)
2024–	Wydad	26	(11)

International career
2013	Netherlands U20	3	(0)
2014	Netherlands U21	4	(1)
- * Club domestic league appearances and goals as of 12 May 2025 (UTC)

Mohamed Rayhi (born 1 July 1994) is a Dutch professional footballer who plays as a winger for Botola Pro club Wydad.

== Career ==
Rayhi was included in the youth academy of PSV Eindhoven in 2003, after having scouted him at WVVZ. As an under-17 player he was sent on loan to Helmond Sport for the 2009–10 season.

Rayhi made his professional debut as a Jong PSV player in the second division on 3 August 2013 against Sparta Rotterdam, where he also scored his first goals.

On 1 October 2020, Rayhi joined Saudi Professional League club Al-Batin.

On 18 July 2022, Rayhi joined Emirati side Al-Dhafra on a free transfer.

On 9 July 2023, Rayhi joined Saudi First Division side Al-Jabalain.

On 23 July 2024, Rayhi joined Wydad AC.

== Honours ==
Individual

- Botola Pro Top scorer: 2024–25 (11 goals)
