= Ismail Moutaraji =

Moroccan footballer (born 2000)

Personal information
- Full name: Ismail Moutaraji
- Date of birth: 1 February 2000 (age 26)
- Place of birth: Casablanca, Morocco
- Height: 1.83 m (6 ft 0 in)
- Position: Attacking midfielder

Team information
- Current team: Wydad AC
- Number: 2

Youth career
- –2019: Wydad AC

Senior career*
Years	Team	Apps	(Gls)
2019–2022	Chabab Mohamedia	51	(10)
2022–	Wydad AC	10	(0)

International career
- Morocco U20
- * Club domestic league appearances and goals as of 20:35, 11 April 2023 (UTC)

Ismail Moutaraji (Arabic: إسماعيل مترجي; born 1 February 2000) is a Moroccan professional footballer who plays as an attacking midfielder for Botola side Wydad AC.

== Club career ==
=== Wydad AC ===
On 15 July 2022, Moutaraji returned to his first club Wydad AC.

On September 10, 2022, he was established under his new coach Hussein Ammouta on the occasion of the final of the CAF Super Cup against RS Berkane.

== International career ==
On July 28, 2022, he was summoned by coach Hicham Dmii for a training camp with the Morocco A' team, appearing on a list of 23 players who will take part in the Islamic Solidarity Games in August 2022.

== Honours ==
=== Club ===
Mohammédia

- Botola 2: 2019–20

=== Personal honours ===
- Botola Top Assist: 2022
