= Arthur (footballer, born 2005) =

Brazilian footballer (born 2005)

Personal information
- Full name: Arthur Wenderroscky Sanches
- Date of birth: 24 February 2005 (age 21)
- Place of birth: Nova Friburgo, Brazil
- Height: 1.70 m (5 ft 7 in)
- Position: Midfielder

Team information
- Current team: Wydad

Youth career
- Escolinha do Country Clube
- Escolinha do São Pedro
- 2015–2021: Fluminense

Senior career*
Years	Team	Apps	(Gls)
2021–2024	Fluminense	12	(0)
2024–	Wydad	0	(0)

International career
2019	Brazil U15	7	(1)
2019	Brazil U16	6	(1)
2022	Brazil U20	1	(0)
- * Club domestic league appearances and goals as of 13:35, 20 September 2024 (UTC)

Arthur Wenderroscky Sanches (born 24 February 2005), commonly known as Arthur, is a Brazilian professional footballer who plays as a midfielder for Wydad.

== Club career ==
On 20 September 2024, Arthur left Fluminense to join Botola club Wydad.

== Career statistics ==
=== Club ===
As of 15 March 2021.

Club	Season	League			State League		Cup		Continental		Other		Total	
Club	Season	Division	Apps	Goals	Apps	Goals	Apps	Goals	Apps	Goals	Apps	Goals	Apps	Goals
Fluminense	2021	Série A	0	0	1 (Note: Appearances in the Campeonato Carioca)	0	0	0	—		0	0	1	0
Career total			0	0	1	0	0	0	0	0	0	0	1	0

== Honours ==
Fluminense

- Copa Libertadores: 2023
