= Moroccan Classico =

Name for Wydad AC and AS FAR rivalry

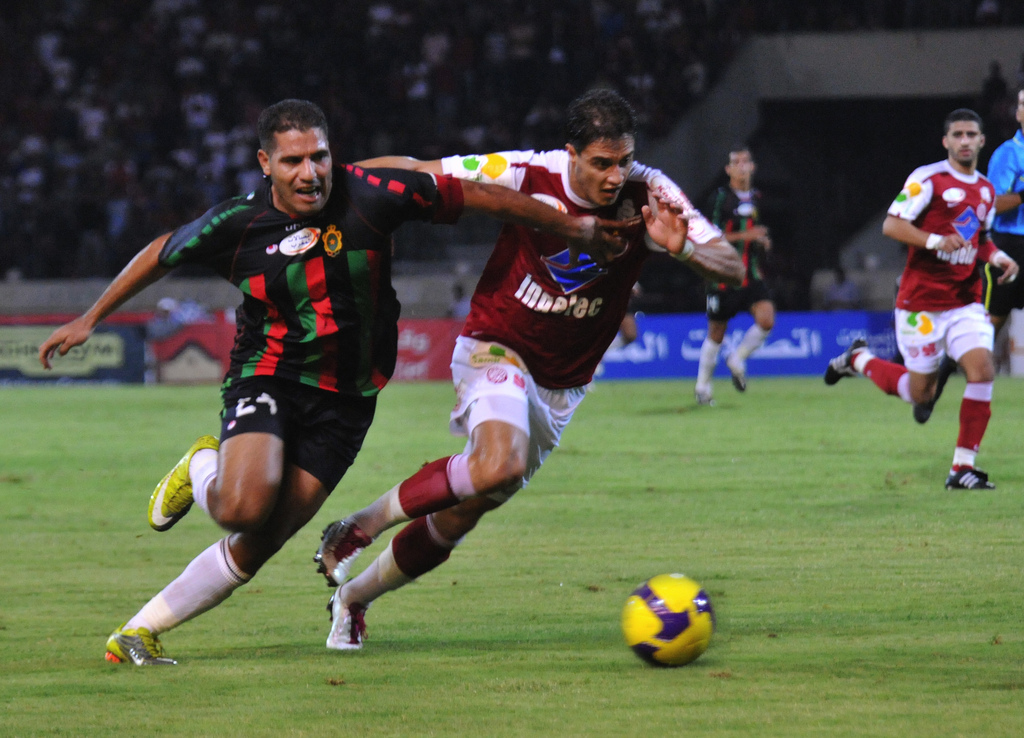
- Location: Morocco (Rabat and Casablanca)
- Teams: Wydad AC; AS FAR
- First meeting: Wydad AC 0–1 AS FAR; 1958–59 Moroccan Throne Cup (6 December 1958)
- Latest meeting: Wydad AC 1–2 AS FAR; 2025–26 Botola Pro (4 Mars 2026)
- Stadiums: Stade Mohammed V (Casablanca); Prince Moulay Abdellah Stadium (Rabat)

Statistics
- Total meetings: 147
- Most wins: Wydad AC (47)
- Largest victory: AS FAR 0–5 Wydad AC; 2016–17 Botola (23 October 2016)

The Moroccan Classico is the name given to matches between Wydad AC and AS FAR football clubs from Casablanca and Rabat, Morocco.

This match is a rivalry between two of the most important and successful clubs in Moroccan football, and the most decorated, as Wydad leads the list of teams with the most Botola titles, and FAR leads the list of clubs with the most Throne Cup wins.

On the other hand, this match can be considered a geographical rivalry, given that one of the clubs belongs to Casablanca, the largest city in Morocco, and the other to Rabat, the country's capital.

== History ==
=== Foundation and Beginnings ===
Wydad AC (Wydad Athletic Club) was founded on May 8, 1937, in Casablanca by a group of nationalist intellectuals and resistance members during the French Protectorate. The aim was to establish a club that represented the Moroccan people and promoted national spirit while ensuring independence from any colonial influence. The club began its activities with a football section and other sports departments, playing its first official matches at a stadium in the Derb el-Melah neighborhood before later moving to the Mohammed V Stadium.

Among the prominent founders was Père Jégo, who became the club’s first coach and helped lay the team’s technical foundations. Wydad started its journey in local amateur competitions before gradually ascending to the first division in 1942, achieving its first major titles in the 1940s.

In contrast, AS FAR (Sports Association of the Royal Armed Forces) was established on September 1, 1958, through an initiative of the military institution and with the blessing of King Hassan II. Its goal was to create a club representing the Royal Armed Forces and participating in official competitions. The team was part of a multi-sport association, with football as its main focus. The club’s official colors are red, black, and green. AS FAR won the Throne Cup in its first season and quickly advanced to the top division, becoming a direct competitor to Wydad in the Moroccan league.

== Results ==
=== Key ===
- F = Final
- SF = Semi-finals
- QF = Quarter-finals
- R16 = Round of 16
- R32 = Round of 32

Wydad win Draw FAR win

=== Botola Pro ===
These are the meetings in the Botola

Team won the competition that season

#	Season	Date	R.	Home team	Away team	Score	Goals (home)	Goals (away)
1	1959–1960	20 December 1959	9	Wydad	FAR	1–1	Ghrari (60)	Mustapha (20)
2	1959–1960	1 May 1960	22	FAR	Wydad	0–0	–	–
3	1960–1961			FAR	Wydad	1–0	?	–
4	1960–1961			Wydad	FAR	1–1	?	?
5	1961–1962			FAR	Wydad	1–2	?	?, ?
6	1961–1962			Wydad	FAR	1–2	?	?, ?
7	1962–1963			FAR	Wydad	0–0	–	–
8	1962–1963			Wydad	FAR	1–1	?	?
9	1963–1964			FAR	Wydad	0–0	–	–
10	1963–1964			Wydad	FAR	1–1	?	?
11	1964–1965			FAR	Wydad	1–1	?	?
12	1964–1965			Wydad	FAR	0–0	–	–
13	1966–1967			FAR	Wydad	1–1	?	?
14	1966–1967			Wydad	FAR	0–0	–	–
15	1967–1968			FAR	Wydad	1–0	?	–
16	1967–1968			Wydad	FAR	1–1	?	?
17	1968–1969			FAR	Wydad	1–1	?	?
18	1968–1969			Wydad	FAR	1–0	Abdelkebir (?)	–
19	1969–1970			FAR	Wydad	0–0	–	–
20	1969–1970			Wydad	FAR	0–1	–	?
21	1970–1971			FAR	Wydad	1–0	?	–
22	1970–1971			Wydad	FAR	1–0	?	–
23	1971–1972			FAR	Wydad	0–0	–	–
24	1971–1972			Wydad	FAR	2–1	?, ?	?
25	1972–1973			FAR	Wydad	0–0	–	–
26	1972–1973			Wydad	FAR	1–2	?	?, ?
27	1973–1974			FAR	Wydad	1–1	?	?
28	1973–1974			Wydad	FAR	2–2	?, ?	?, ?
29	1974–1975			FAR	Wydad	2–0	?, ?	–
30	1974–1975			Wydad	FAR	1–0	?	–
31	1975–1976			FAR	Wydad	0–0	–	–
32	1975–1976			Wydad	FAR	3–0	?, ?, ?	–
33	1976–1977			FAR	Wydad	2–0	?, ?	–
34	1976–1977			Wydad	FAR	3–1	?, ?, ?	
35	1977–1978		14	Wydad	FAR	1–0	Shaita (57)	–
36	1977–1978		29	FAR	Wydad	0–0	–	–
37	1978–1979			FAR	Wydad	0–0	–	–
38	1978–1979			Wydad	FAR	2–1	?, ?	?
39	1979–1980	3 February 1980	13	FAR	Wydad	3–0	Tounsi (74), Chellal (81), Naji (89)	–
40	1979–1980	24 May 1980	28	Wydad	FAR	4–1	Ahardane (10, 62, 64), Abdelkhalek (60)	Ouadich (38)
41	1980–1981		5	FAR	Wydad	0–0	–	–
42	1980–1981		24	Wydad	FAR	0–3	–	Tniouni (11, 60), Ouadich (78)
43	1981–1982	9 January 1982	14	FAR	Wydad	1–1	Tniouni (33)	Ahardane (1)
44	1981–1982	28 May 1982	31	Wydad	FAR	2–2	?, ?	?, ?
45	1982–1983	13 November 1982	10	FAR	Wydad	1–4	Ouadich (25)	Benhmida (41), Bouderbala (55), Fakhreddine (60), Saber (73)
46	1982–1983		25	Wydad	FAR	1–0	?	–
47	1983–1984			Wydad	FAR	1–1	Malik (?)	Hamdi (?)
48	1983–1984			FAR	Wydad	1–0	?	–
49	1984–1985			FAR	Wydad	2–1	Hcina (?), Lamsaouri (? p.)	Fakhreddine (?)
50	1984–1985			Wydad	FAR	1–1	Fakhreddine (?)	Halim (?)
51	1985–1986			FAR	Wydad	2–0	?, ?	–
52	1985–1986			Wydad	FAR	0–0	–	–
53	1986–1987			FAR	Wydad	2–2	?, ?	?, ?
54	1986–1987			Wydad	FAR	0–0	–	–
55	1987–1988			FAR	Wydad	0–0	–	–
56	1987–1988			Wydad	FAR	0–0	–	–
57	1988–1989			FAR	Wydad	1–0	?	–
58	1988–1989			Wydad	FAR	0–0	–	–
59	1989–1990		4	Wydad	FAR	1–0	?	–
60	1989–1990		19	FAR	Wydad	3–0	?, ?, ?	–
61	1990–1991		3	Wydad	FAR	3–1	Ndao (?, ?), Daoudi (? p.)	Anaflous (?)
62	1990–1991		18	FAR	Wydad	0–1	–	Khlifi (? o.g.)
63	1991–1992			FAR	Wydad	2–2	?, ?	?, ?
64	1991–1992			Wydad	FAR	0–0	–	–
65	1992–1993		3	Wydad	FAR	2–0	Fertout (8, 60)	–
66	1992–1993		18	FAR	Wydad	1–1	Anaflous (?)	Daoudi (28)
67	1993–1994			Wydad	FAR	2–2	Daoudi (?), Chafik (?)	El Hadrioui (?), Ouchla (?)
68	1993–1994			FAR	Wydad	2–2	?, ?	?, ?
69	1994–1995			FAR	Wydad	1–1	?	?
70	1994–1995			Wydad	FAR	1–3	Allali (70)	Laghrissi (9, 45, 90)
71	1995–1996			Wydad	FAR	0–0	–	–
72	1995–1996			FAR	Wydad	0–3	–	Loumari (20, 43 p., 88)
73	1996–1997			FAR	Wydad	0–0	–	–
74	1996–1997			Wydad	FAR	1–1	?	?
75	1997–1998			FAR	Wydad	2–0	Laouzi (?), Sahfi (?)	–
76	1997–1998			Wydad	FAR	2–1	?, ?	?
77	1998–1999			FAR	Wydad	2–1	?, ?	?
78	1998–1999	6 February 1999		Wydad	FAR	3–1	Abdelfattah (?), Chbouki (?), Termina (?)	Fadli (?)
79	1999–2000	3 October 1999		FAR	Wydad	1–1	?	?
80	1999–2000	2 April 2000		Wydad	FAR	3–3	?, ?, ?	?, ?, ?
81	2000–2001	4 November 2000		FAR	Wydad	0–3	–	El Afoui (?, ?), Allali (? p.)
82	2000–2001	1 Mars 2001		Wydad	FAR	3–3	Abrami (45+3), Kessab (72), Raji (78)	Foulouh (26), Armoumen (50), Ouchla (90+5)
83	2001–2002	14 October 2001		FAR	Wydad	0–3	–	Mabrouk (43, ?), Benchrifa (?)
84	2001–2002	17 February 2002		Wydad	FAR	1–0	Benchrifa (? p.)	–
85	2002–2003	22 December 2002		FAR	Wydad	0–0	–	–
86	2002–2003	4 May 2003		Wydad	FAR	1–1	Raji (?)	Fadli (?)
87	2003–2004	15 October 2003		Wydad	FAR	0–0	–	–
88	2003–2004	6 Mars 2004		FAR	Wydad	0–0	–	–
89	2004–2005	31 October 2004		Wydad	FAR	1–0	Benchrifa (76)	–
90	2004–2005	27 Mars 2005		FAR	Wydad	0–0	–	–
91	2005–2006	23 November 2005		FAR	Wydad	0–0	–	–
92	2005–2006	8 Mars 2006		Wydad	FAR	1–0	El Brazi (25)	–
93	2006–2007	20 December 2006		FAR	Wydad	0–1	–	Toure (32)
94	2006–2007	14 April 2007		Wydad	FAR	1–0	Ajraoui (55)	–
95	2007–2008	5 January 2008		Wydad	FAR	0–0	–	–
96	2007–2008	1 June 2008		FAR	Wydad	1–2	Kacemi (90+4)	Bidoudane (8, 43)
97	2008–2009	2 November 2008		FAR	Wydad	2–0	Bendriss (70), Kaddioui (74)	–
98	2008–2009	18 April 2009		Wydad	FAR	0–0	–	–
99	2009–2010	7 November 2009		FAR	Wydad	1–0	Jaouad (14)	–
100	2009–2010	13 Mars 2010		Wydad	FAR	1–0	Sekkat (35 p.)	–
101	2010–2011	19 September 2010		Wydad	FAR	1–1	Iajour (11)	Kabli (45+2)
102	2010–2011	13 April 2011		FAR	Wydad	1–1	Ouaddouch (23)	Allaoui (33)
103	2011–2012	11 December 2011		FAR	Wydad	2–2	Fellah (20), Kabli (76)	Mouithys (31 p.), Lemsen (70)
104	2011–2012	14 April 2012		Wydad	FAR	2–0	Kone (75), Houassi (86)	–
105	2012–2013	19 September 2012		FAR	Wydad	2–0	Aqqal (20, 58)	–
106	2012–2013	29 May 2013		Wydad	FAR	0–1	–	Jounaid (38)
107	2013–2014	15 December 2013		Wydad	FAR	2–1	Evouna (19), Ondama (37)	Berrahma (71)
108	2013–2014	27 April 2014		FAR	Wydad	1–1	Naghmi (5)	Evouna (62)
109	2014–2015	7 December 2014		FAR	Wydad	1–2	Berrahma (87)	Berrabeh (17), Evouna (73)
110	2014–2015	18 April 2015		Wydad	FAR	2–0	Atouchi (71), Ondama (88)	–
111	2015–2016	6 September 2015		Wydad	FAR	4–2	Hajhouj (38), El Karti (63), El Moutaraji (70, 90+3)	Tair (75), El Yousfi (85)
112	2015–2016	17 February 2016		FAR	Wydad	0–2	–	El Karti (40), Ondama (79)
113	2016–2017	23 October 2016		FAR	Wydad	0–5	–	Bencharki (31), Rabeh (40), Saidi (80), Jebor (87 p.), Ondama (88)
114	2016–2017	23 April 2017		Wydad	FAR	1–1	Jebor (86)	El Yousfi (18)
115	2017–2018	19 November 2017		FAR	Wydad	0–0	–	–
116	2017–2018	29 April 2018		Wydad	FAR	3–1	El Haddad (10), Nahiri (17), Tighazoui (33)	Ijroten (40)
117	2018–2019	9 December 2018		Wydad	FAR	1–0	El Karti (43)	–
118	2018–2019	10 May 2019		FAR	Wydad	1–1	Berrahma (90+6 p.)	Jebor (12 p.)
119	2019–2020	19 December 2019		Wydad	FAR	1–0	Aouk (69 p.)	–
120	2019–2020	9 September 2020		FAR	Wydad	1–1	Goudali (85)	El Haddad (17)
121	2020–2021	9 May 2021		FAR	Wydad	0–0	–	–
122	2020–2021	28 July 2021		Wydad	FAR	2–0	El Moutaraji (22, 49)	–
123	2021–2022	28 October 2021		FAR	Wydad	0–1	–	Ellafi (61)
124	2021–2022	29 April 2022		Wydad	FAR	3–0	Mbenza (25), Jabrane (90+3 p.) Haimoud (90+5)	–
125	2022–2023	29 December 2022		FAR	Wydad	3–0	Slim (4), Hammoudan (31), Guede (78)	–
126	2022–2023	3 May 2023		Wydad	FAR	1–1	Borges (45+6 o.g.)	Aboulfath (90+7 o.g.)
127	2023–2024	28 November 2023		FAR	Wydad	3–1	Naji (58), Ait Ouarkhane, (85), Diakité (90)	Jabrane (45+12 p.)
128	2023–2024	13 April 2024		Wydad	FAR	0–1	–	Hrimat (45+1)
129	2024–2025	19 December 2024		FAR	Wydad	2–2	Hrimat (4), El Fahli (49)	Zemraoui (14), Rayhi (18)
130	2024–2025	3 May 2025		Wydad	FAR	2–1	Obeng (32), Lorch (67)	Hadraf (57)
131	2025–2026	4 Mars 2026		Wydad	FAR	1–2	Ziyech	Sabbar (o.g.), El Fahli
132	2025–2026	2026		FAR	Wydad	–		

=== Throne Cup ===
These are the meetings in the Moroccan Throne Cup

Team won the competition that season

#	Season	Date	R.	Home team	Away team	Score	Goals (home)	Goals (away)
1	1958–1959	6 December 1958	R16	Wydad	FAR	0–1	–	Kacem (109)
2	1960–1961		SF	Wydad	FAR	2–0	?, ?	–
3	1960–1961		SF	FAR	Wydad	1–0	?	–
4	1966–1967		QF	FAR	Wydad	1–0	?	–
5	1967–1968		R16	Wydad	FAR	1–1	?	?
6	1967–1968		R16	FAR	Wydad	0–0 (Note: FAR won 8–7 on penalties.)	–	–
7	1980–1981		R32	FAR	Wydad	1–2	?	?, ?
8	1980–1981		R32	Wydad	FAR	0–0	–	–
9	1988–1989		SF	Wydad	FAR	3–2	Ndao (?, ?), Nader (?)	Laghrissi (?), Anaflous (?)
10	1993–1994		SF	FAR	Wydad	0–1	–	Fertout (55)
11	1997–1998	11 July 1999	F	FAR	Wydad	1–2	Ouchla (41 p.)	Kessab (25), Allali (63)
12	2002–2003	11 January 2004	F	FAR	Wydad	1–0	Abdessadek (6)	–
13	2003–2004	28 November 2004	F	FAR	Wydad	0–0 (Note: FAR won 3–0 on penalties.)	–	–
14	2006–2007	3 November 2007	QF	FAR	Wydad	1–1 (Note: FAR won 4–3 on penalties.)	Mssassi (3)	El Brazi (90+3)
15	2008–2009	1 July 2009	QF	FAR	Wydad	0–0 (Note: FAR won 4–2 on penalties.)	–	–
16	2018–2019	24 September 2019	R32	Wydad	FAR	1–3	El Kaabi (90)	Guede (50), Slim (86, 90+3)

== Statistics ==
=== Overall match statistics ===
As of 14 June 2026

Competition	Matches	Wins		Draws	Goals	
Competition	Matches	FAR	WAC	Draws	FAR	WAC
Botola Pro	132	27	42	63	108	134
Throne Cup	16	5	5	6	13	13
Total	148	32	47	69	121	147

=== Honours ===
- Numbers with this background indicate the record in the competition.

AS FAR	Competition	Wydad AC
Domestic
13	Botola Pro	22
12	Moroccan Throne Cup	9
25	Aggregate	31
Continental
1	CAF Champions League	3
1	CAF Confederation Cup	0
0	CAF Super Cup	1
0	African Cup Winners' Cup (defunct)	1
0	Afro-Asian Club Championship (defunct)	1
2	Aggregate	6
Regional
0	Arab Club Champions Cup	1
0	Arab Elite Cup (defunct)	1
0	Mohammed V Cup (defunct)	1
0	North African Championship (defunct)	3
0	North African Cup (defunct)	1
0	Aggregate	7
27	Total Aggregate	44

=== Head-to-head ranking (1957–2025) ===
P.	57	58	59	60	61	62	63	64	65	66	67	68	69	70	71	72	73	74	75	76	77	78	79	80	81	82	83	84	85	86	87	88	89	90	91	92	93	94	95	96	97	98	99	00	01	02	03	04	05	06	07	08	09	10	11	12	13	14	15	16	17	18	19	20	21	22	23	24	25
1	1				1	1	1	1		1	1	1	1	1						1	1	1						1		1	1		1	1	1		1												1	1		1		1					1		1		1		1	1	1		
2		2	2	2											2	2								2		2									2			2			2			2		2		2		2	2						2			2		2		2			2	2	2
3													3										3				3		3	3		3				3		3		3		3					3		3				3		3	3									3	3			3
4				4					4		4					4									4				4			4							4				4					4			4		4				4			4									
5									5					5				5										5					5						5			5																										5	
6						6	6	6																		6					6					6				6						6									6			6			6			6					
7					7										7						7	7					7							7							7				7							7		7		7		7											
8												8																									8						8																			8							
9																	9	9	9						9																			9	9		9																						
10																							10																																														
11																																																											11										
12																	12		12	12																																																	
13																								13																																													
14																																																															14						
15																																																																					
16																																																																					
17																																																																					
18																																																																					
19																																																																					
20																																																																					

- Total: Wydad with 39 higher finishes, FAR with 25 higher finishes (as of the end of the 2024–25 season). No head-to-heads in 1957 and 1958, since AS FAR had not yet been founded, and in 1959, since AS FAR was in the Botola 2, and in 1966, since AS FAR was suspended from the league.

=== Hat-tricks ===
No.	Player	For	Score	Date	Competition	Stadium
1	(Morocco) Larbi Aherdane	Wydad AC	4–1 (H)	24 May 1980	1979–80 Botola	Stade Père Jégo
2	(Morocco) Abdeslam Laghrissi	AS FAR	1–3 (A)	1995	1994–95 Botola	Stade Mohamed V
3	(Morocco) Driss Loumari	Wydad AC	0–3 (A)	1996	1995–96 Botola	Moulay Abdellah Sports Complex

== Records ==
=== Results ===
==== Biggest wins (3+ goals) ====
Winning margin	Result	Date	Competition
5	FAR 0–5 Wydad	23 October 2016	Botola Pro
3	Wydad 4–1 FAR	24 May 1980	Botola Pro
3	FAR 1–4 Wydad	13 November 1982	Botola Pro
3	Wydad 3–0 FAR	1976	Botola Pro
3	FAR 3–0 Wydad	3 February 1980	Botola Pro
3	Wydad 0–3 FAR	1981	Botola Pro
3	FAR 3–0 Wydad	1990	Botola Pro
3	FAR 0–3 Wydad	1996	Botola Pro
3	FAR 0–3 Wydad	4 November 2000	Botola Pro
3	FAR 0–3 Wydad	14 October 2001	Botola Pro
3	Wydad 3–0 FAR	29 April 2022	Botola Pro
3	FAR 3–0 Wydad	29 December 2022	Botola Pro

==== Most goals in a match (5+ goals) ====
Goals	Result	Date	Competition
6	Wydad 3–3 FAR	2 April 2000	Botola Pro
6	Wydad 3–3 FAR	1 Mars 2001	Botola Pro
6	Wydad 4–2 FAR	6 September 2015	Botola Pro
5	Wydad 4–1 FAR	24 May 1980	Botola Pro
5	FAR 1–4 Wydad	13 November 1982	Botola Pro
5	Wydad 3–2 FAR	1989	Throne Cup
5	FAR 0–5 Wydad	23 October 2016	Botola Pro

== Personnel at both clubs ==
=== Players ===
FAR, then Wydad

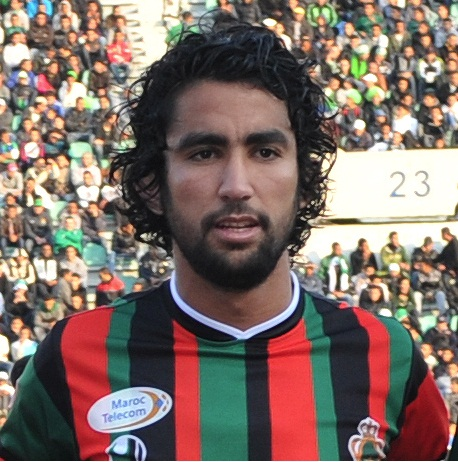
Salaheddine Saidi

- 1973: (Morocco) Mohamed Maaroufi
- 2004: (Morocco) Zakaria Aboub
- 2005: (Morocco) Faouzi El Brazi
- 2009: (Morocco) Mohamed Armoumen
- 2009: (Morocco) Ahmed Ajeddou
- 2010: (Morocco) Abderrahmane Mssassi
- 2011: (Morocco) Mustapha Allaoui
- 2011: (Morocco) Youssef Kaddioui
- 2011: (Morocco) Youssef Rabeh
- 2014: (Morocco) Brahim Nekkach
- 2014: (Morocco) Salaheddine Saidi
- 2015: (Morocco) Brahim El Bahri
- 2016: (Morocco) El Mehdi Karnass
- 2018: (Morocco) Ayoub El Amloud
- 2019: (Morocco) Mohamed Kamal
- 2021: (Morocco) Jalal Daoudi
- 2024: (Morocco) Abdelmounaim Boutouil
- 2024: (Morocco) Mohamed Moufid
- 2025: (Morocco) Mehdi Benabid
- 2025: (Botswana) Tumisang Orebonye

Wydad, then FAR

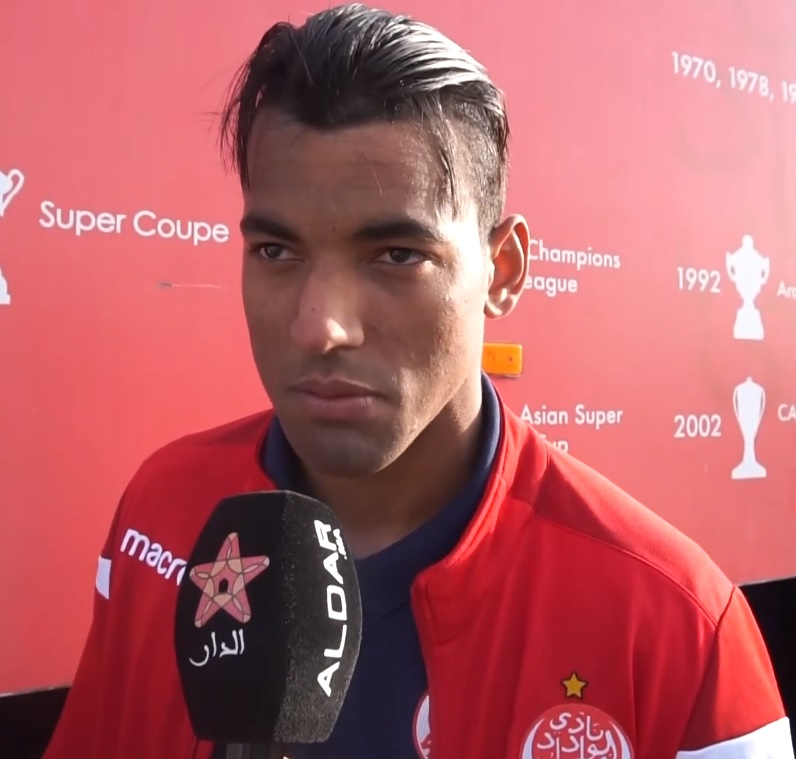
Ahmed Reda Tagnaouti

- 1958: (Morocco) Mohamed Anouar "Chtouki"
- 2003: (Morocco) Tarik El Jarmouni
- 2003: (Morocco) Rabie El Afoui
- 2004: (Morocco) Adil Serraj
- 2008: (Morocco) Mourad Fellah
- 2009: (Morocco) Mohamed Madihi
- 2012: (Morocco) Youness Bellakhder
- 2014: (Morocco) Nabil Loualji
- 2014: (Morocco) Taoufik Ijroten
- 2015: (Morocco) Hicham El Amrani
- 2015: (Morocco) Yassine El Houasli
- 2015: (Morocco) Said Fettah
- 2025: (Morocco) Ahmed Reda Tagnaouti
- 2026: (Morocco) Nabil Marmouk
- 2026: (Morocco) Yazid Faffa

=== Managers ===
FAR, then Wydad

- 2023: (Belgium) Sven Vandenbroeck
- 2026: (Tunisia) Nasreddine Nabi

Wydad, then FAR

- 2012: (Morocco) Rachid Taoussi
- 2015: (Portugal) José Romão
- 2019: (Morocco) Abderrahim Talib

== See also ==
- Casablanca derby
