= Football at the 2001 Jeux de la Francophonie =

2001 Football at the Jeux de la Francophonie
Tournament details
- Host country: Canada
- City: Ottawa
- Dates: 12 July - 24 July
- Teams: 12 (from 3 confederations)
- Venues: 2 (in 1 host city)

Final positions
- Champions: Morocco (1st title)
- Runners-up: France
- Third place: Egypt
- Fourth place: Cameroon

Tournament statistics
- Matches played: 26
- Goals scored: 90 (3.46 per match)
- All statistics correct as of 13 July 2010.

Each nation brought their under-20 teams to compete in a group and knockout tournament. The top two teams and the best third placed team advanced to the knockout stage of the competition. Morocco won the tournament after a 1–0 win over France.

== Squads ==
=== Morocco ===
Head coach: (Morocco) Mustapha Madih

No.	Pos.	Player	Date of birth (age)	Club
1	GK	Omar Charef	19 February 1981 (aged 20)	(Royal Moroccan Football Federation) MC Oujda
4	DF	Ali Bouabé	7 March 1979 (aged 22)	(Royal Moroccan Football Federation) Kenitra AC
5	DF	Adil Bekkari	24 April 1978 (aged 23)	(Royal Moroccan Football Federation) Raja CA
6	DF	Badr El Kaddouri	31 January 1981 (aged 20)	(Royal Moroccan Football Federation) Wydad Casablanca
7	FW	Mohamed Benhalib		(Royal Moroccan Football Federation) Wydad Casablanca
8	FW	Saïd Kharazi	1 August 1982 (aged 18)	(Royal Moroccan Football Federation) Raja CA
9	FW	Oifeck El Moujahid	31 March 1981 (aged 20)	(French Football Federation) Nîmes Olympique
10	MF	Redouane El Ouardi	13 November 1981 (aged 19)	(French Football Federation) RC Lens
11	MF	Nabil Mesloub	1 May 1979 (aged 22)	(Royal Moroccan Football Federation) Raja CA
12	GK	Hamza Boudlal	18 March 1982 (aged 19)	(Royal Moroccan Football Federation) OC Khouribga
15	DF	Hamadi Zahani	1980	(Royal Moroccan Football Federation) IZ Khemisset
16	FW	Mohamed Armoumen	7 September 1978 (aged 22)	(Royal Moroccan Football Federation) FAR Rabat
17	MF	Aziz Souidi	21 January 1979 (aged 22)	(Royal Moroccan Football Federation) FUS Rabat
18	FW	Karim Benkouar	25 November 1979 (aged 21)	(Royal Belgian Football Association) Charleroi SC
19	FW	Mustapha Allaoui	30 May 1984 (aged 17)	(Royal Moroccan Football Federation) MAS Fez
20	MF	Chamseddine El Janabi	6 February 1980 (aged 21)	(Royal Moroccan Football Federation) Wydad Casablanca
22	GK	Fahd Lahmadi	13 March 1980 (aged 21)	(Royal Moroccan Football Federation) Hassania Agadir

=== France ===
Head coach: (France) Pierre Mankowski

No.	Pos.	Player	Date of birth (age)	Club
1	GK	Olivier Blondel	9 July 1979 (aged 22)	(French Football Federation) Le Havre AC
2	DF	Stéphane Borbiconi	22 March 1979 (aged 22)	(French Football Federation) FC Metz
3	DF	Fabrice Kelban	10 September 1978 (aged 22)	(French Football Federation) Paris Saint-Germain
4	DF	Julien Vellas	28 September 1980 (aged 20)	(Portuguese Football Federation) S.C. Espinho
5	DF	Michel Rodriguez	25 November 1978 (aged 22)	(French Football Federation) Montpellier HSC
6	MF	Uliano Courville	8 August 1978 (aged 22)	(French Football Federation) AS Monaco
7	FW	Nicolas Girard	12 April 1978 (aged 23)	(French Football Federation) AS Beauvais
8	MF	Fabien Boudarène	5 October 1978 (aged 22)	(French Football Federation) AS Saint-Etienne
9	FW	Sébastien Fidani	4 August 1978 (aged 22)	(French Football Federation) Nîmes Olympique
10	MF	David Romo	7 August 1978 (aged 22)	(Football Association of Wales) Swansea FC
11	MF	Medhi Leroy	18 April 1978 (aged 23)	(French Football Federation) ES Troyes AC
13	MF	Patrice Maurel	16 October 1978 (aged 22)	(French Football Federation) Toulouse FC
15	DF	Mickaël Wolski	5 March 1979 (aged 22)	(French Football Federation) FC Gueugnon
16	DF	Mathias Kouo-Doumbé	28 October 1979 (aged 21)	(French Football Federation) Paris Saint-Germain
17	FW	William Correa	21 March 1980 (aged 21)	(French Football Federation) Le Havre AC
18	FW	Roland Vieira	16 August 1979 (aged 21)	(French Football Federation) Olympique Lyonnais
19	FW	Kenny Vigier	2 January 1979 (aged 22)	(French Football Federation) Paris Saint-Germain
20	GK	Nicolas Bonis	30 August 1981 (aged 19)	(French Football Federation) RC Strasbourg

=== Canada ===
Head coach:

No.	Pos.	Player	Date of birth (age)	Club
1	GK	Kenny Stamatopoulos	28 August 1979 (aged 21)	(Hellenic Football Federation) Kalamata
2	DF	Tyler Hughes	5 October 1978 (aged 22)	(United States Soccer Federation) Coastal Carolina Chanticleers
3	DF	Adrian Cann	19 September 1980 (aged 20)	Unattached
4	DF	Kevan Cameron	1 February 1979 (aged 22)	(Canadian Soccer Association) Montreal Impact
5	DF	Chris Williams	1 June 1981 (aged 20)	Unattached
6	MF	Patrice Bernier	23 September 1979 (aged 21)	(Canadian Soccer Association) Montreal Impact
7	MF	Rhian Dodds	3 October 1979 (aged 21)	Unattached
9	FW	Gaspare Borsellino	5 June 1981 (aged 20)	(Canadian Soccer Association) Montreal Impact
10	MF	Alfredo Valente	6 November 1980 (aged 20)	(Canadian Soccer Association) Vancouver Whitecaps FC
11	FW	Rob Friend	23 January 1981 (aged 20)	(United States Soccer Federation) UC Santa Barbara Gauchos
13	DF	Chris Pozniak	10 January 1981 (aged 20)	(Canadian Soccer Association) Toronto Lynx
14	FW	Wyn Belotte	30 August 1981 (aged 19)	(French Football Federation) FC Nantes
15	MF	Atiba Hutchinson	8 February 1983 (aged 18)	(Canadian Soccer Association) Woodbridge SC
17	MF	Nilton Terroso	13 September 1979 (aged 21)	Unattached
	MF	Jason Di Tullio	6 January 1984 (aged 17)	Unattached
	MF	Ive Sulentic	24 December 1979 (aged 21)	(Canadian Soccer Association) Vancouver Whitecaps FC
	GK	Pieter Meuleman	4 April 1981 (aged 20)	(Canadian Soccer Association) Wilfrid Laurier University
	MF	Kevin De Serpa	21 May 1980 (aged 21)	(Brazilian Football Confederation) EC Comercial
	MF	Josh Simpson	15 May 1983 (aged 18)	(United States Soccer Federation) University of Portland
	FW	Sean Fraser	21 September 1980 (aged 20)	(United States Soccer Federation) Memphis Tigers
	FW	Andrew Veer	6 May 1984 (aged 17)	(Canadian Soccer Association) Simon Fraser University

=== Egypt ===
Head coach: (Egypt) Shawky Gharieb

No.	Pos.	Player	Date of birth (age)	Club
1	GK	Mohamed Sobhy	30 August 1981 (aged 19)	(Egyptian Football Association) Ismaily
2	DF	Ahmed Samir	3 October 1981 (aged 19)	(Egyptian Football Association) Baladeyet El-Mahalla
3	MF	Abou El-Magd Mostafa	1 January 1981 (aged 20)	(Egyptian Football Association) Al Ahly
4	DF	Hussein Amin	26 April 1981 (aged 20)	(Egyptian Football Association) Al Ahly
5	DF	Mahmoud Mahmoud	30 June 1981 (aged 20)	(Egyptian Football Association) Zamalek SC
6	DF	Mohamed Mahrous El-Atrawy	19 August 1981 (aged 19)	(Egyptian Football Association) Ghazl Al-Mehalla
7	MF	Mohamed Shawky	5 October 1981 (aged 19)	(Egyptian Football Association) Al-Masry
8	MF	Wael Riad	2 August 1982 (aged 18)	(Egyptian Football Association) Al Ahly
9	MF	Reda Shehata	24 January 1981 (aged 20)	(Egyptian Football Association) Al Ahly
10	FW	Mohamed Mohsen Abo Gresha	4 August 1981 (aged 19)	(Egyptian Football Association) Ismaily
11	FW	Ahmed Belal	20 August 1980 (aged 20)	(Egyptian Football Association) Al Ahly
12	FW	Amir Salah Zaky	16 September 1979 (aged 21)	(Egyptian Football Association) Ghazl Al-Mehalla
13	DF	Amr El Desouki	1 January 1980 (aged 21)	(Egyptian Football Association) Al-Masry
14	MF	Hossam Ghaly	15 December 1981 (aged 19)	(Egyptian Football Association) Al Ahly
15	MF	Ahmed Abou Moslem	25 July 1981 (aged 19)	(Egyptian Football Association) Al Ahly
16	GK	Sherif Ekramy	1 July 1983 (aged 18)	(Egyptian Football Association) Al Ahly
17	MF	Mohamed Ezz Eddine	16 September 1980 (aged 20)	(Egyptian Football Association) Al Mokawloon SC
18	DF	Mohsen El Shahat	12 September 1979 (aged 21)	(Egyptian Football Association) Ghazl Al-Mehalla

== Group stage ==
=== Group A ===
Team	Pld	W	D	L	GF	GA	GD	Pts
France	3	2	1	0	8	4	+4	7
Romania	3	2	1	0	8	6	+2	7
Burkina Faso	3	1	0	2	4	7	−3	3
Haiti	3	0	0	3	5	8	−3	0

2001-07-12

Romania	3 – 2	Haiti

2001-07-13

France	3 – 0	Burkina Faso
Girard 2'; Fidani 38', 45'	Report

2001-07-15

Romania	2 – 1	Burkina Faso
Munteanu 25', 32'		Traoré 88'

2001-07-15

France	2 – 1	Haiti
Girard 10', 75'	Report	Ulcenat 57'

2001-07-17

Burkina Faso	3 – 2	Haiti
		Gracien 42', 78'

2001-07-17

France	3 – 3	Romania
Fidani 32', 67'; Romo 58' (o.g.)	Report	Vigariu 1'; Gheorghe 78'; Bratu 81'

=== Group B ===
Team	Pld	W	D	L	GF	GA	GD	Pts
Egypt	3	3	0	0	8	4	+4	9
Gabon	3	2	0	1	9	4	+5	6
Canada	3	1	0	2	5	3	+2	3
Bulgaria	3	0	0	3	0	11	−11	0

2001-07-12

Egypt	2 – 0	Bulgaria

2001-07-13

Gabon	1 – 0	Canada
Evrard 8'

2001-07-15

Gabon	5 – 0	Bulgaria

2001-07-15

Egypt	2 – 1	Canada
Belal 21', 50'		Friend 63'

2001-07-17

Egypt	4 – 3	Gabon

2001-07-17

Canada	4 – 0	Bulgaria
Friend 22', 26'; Borsellino 45', 57'

=== Group C ===
Team	Pld	W	D	L	GF	GA	GD	Pts
Cameroon	3	2	1	0	4	1	+3	7
Morocco	3	1	2	0	7	2	+5	5
Mali	3	1	1	1	6	5	+1	4
Poland	3	0	0	3	3	12	−9	0

2001-07-12

Morocco	5 – 0	Poland

2001-07-13

Cameroon	1 – 0	Mali

2001-07-15

Mali	4 – 2	Poland

2001-07-15

Morocco	0 – 0	Cameroon

2001-07-17

Morocco	2 – 2	Mali

2001-07-17

Cameroon	3 – 1	Poland

== Knockout stage ==
Quarter-finals
20 July -
Morocco	4
Romania	1
19 July -
Egypt	3
Mali	1
19 July -
Gabon	1 (5)
Cameroon	1 (6)
19 July -
France	2 (3)
Canada	2 (1)

Semi-finals
22 July -
Egypt	0 (3)
Morocco	0 (5)
22 July -
France	2
Cameroon	1

Final
24 July -
Morocco	1
France	0
Third place
24 July -
Egypt	3
Cameroon	0

== See also ==
- Football at the Jeux de la Francophonie
