= Football at the 2005 Mediterranean Games – Men's team squads =

Below are the squads for the Football at the 2005 Mediterranean Games, hosted in Almería, Spain, and took place between 23 June and 3 July 2005. Teams were national U-23 sides (although in fact none of the players named were older than 21).

== Group A ==
=== Italy ===
Head coach: (Italy) Pietro Ghedin

No.	Pos.	Player	Date of birth (age)	Caps	Goals	Club
1	GK	Enrico Rossi Chauvenet	4 June 1984 (aged 21)	2	0	(Italian Football Federation) Padova
2	DF	Domenico Citro	17 September 1984 (aged 20)	3	0	(Italian Football Federation) Carrarese
3	DF	Federico Peluso	20 January 1984 (aged 21)	3	0	(Italian Football Federation) Ternana
4	DF	Mauro Belotti	13 May 1984 (aged 21)	2	0	(Italian Football Federation) Prato (on loan from AlbinoLeffe)
5	DF	Michelangelo Palazzo	9 March 1984 (aged 21)	3	0	(Italian Football Federation) Olbia
6	MF	Filippo Porcari	28 April 1984 (aged 21)	3	0	(Italian Football Federation) Pisa (on loan from Milan)
7	MF	Nico Pulzetti	13 February 1984 (aged 21)	2	0	(Italian Football Federation) Castelnuovo (on loan from Cesena)
8	MF	Gianluca Galasso	18 January 1984 (aged 21)	3	0	(Italian Football Federation) Salernitana (on loan from Roma)
9	FW	Antimo Iunco	6 June 1984 (aged 21)	2	0	(Italian Football Federation) Verona
10	FW	Daniele Vantaggiato	10 October 1984 (aged 20)	3	0	(Italian Football Federation) Crotone
11	FW	Simone Masini	23 October 1984 (aged 20)	3	0	(Italian Football Federation) Cesena (on loan from Lucchese)
12	GK	Davide Capello	27 September 1984 (aged 20)	1	0	(Italian Football Federation) Belluno (on loan from Cagliari)
13	DF	Dario Bova	31 March 1984 (aged 21)	2	0	(Italian Football Federation) Imolese
14	DF	Riccardo Bolzan	1 September 1984 (aged 20)	0	0	(Italian Football Federation) Sangiovannese
15	MF	Fabio Catacchini	19 January 1984 (aged 21)	3	0	(Italian Football Federation) Pistoiese
16	MF	Paolo Facchinetti	6 March 1984 (aged 21)	1	0	(Italian Football Federation) Montichiari
17	MF	Paolo Ruffini	6 March 1984 (aged 21)	2	0	(Italian Football Federation) Pro Sesto
18	FW	Federico Piovaccari	10 September 1984 (aged 20)	2	0	(Italian Football Federation) Vittoria (on loan from Internazionale)

=== Libya ===
Head coach: (Croatia) Ante Čačić

No.	Pos.	Player	Date of birth (age)	Caps	Goals	Club
1	GK	Abdissalam Msallem	1 January 1984 (aged 21)	2	0	
2	DF	Zakaria Benmusa	9 December 1984 (aged 20)	5	0	
3	DF	Mansur Agala	2 November 1984 (aged 20)	4	0	
4	DF	Abddrahman Ezwawi	9 May 1984 (aged 21)	5	0	
5	DF	Mohamed Ben Nabia	15 May 1984 (aged 21)	4	0	
6	MF	Mohamed Fares	6 September 1985 (aged 19)	5	0	
8	MF	Hamed Ahniash	9 April 1984 (aged 21)	4	0	
9	FW	Nabil Hndi	1 January 1984 (aged 21)	5	0	
10	MF	Marwan Almabrok	1 January 1984 (aged 21)	5	0	
13	MF	Ayman El-Hagi	6 January 1984 (aged 21)	3	0	
14	FW	Ala Mohamed	24 April 1985 (aged 20)	2	0	
16	MF	Mohamed Esnany	13 May 1984 (aged 21)	4	0	
17	DF	Mohamed Gbrail	7 July 1985 (aged 19)	5	0	
19	DF	Ibrahim Abda	2 September 1984 (aged 20)	4	0	
20	FW	Ahmed Wafa	1 January 1986 (aged 19)	2	0	
21	GK	Muhsan Ashrif	1 December 1985 (aged 19)	3	0	
22	MF	Mohamed El-Mughraby	1 January 1985 (aged 20)	4	0	
24	MF	Walid El-Khatroushi	1 January 1985 (aged 20)	5	0	

=== Morocco ===
Head coach: (Morocco) Aziz El Khiyati

No.	Pos.	Player	Date of birth (age)	Caps	Goals	Club
1	GK	Mohamed Baze	1 January 1986 (aged 19)	5	0	
2	DF	Jamaleddine Omari	2 February 1984 (aged 21)	5	0	
3	MF	Khalid Sekkat	12 May 1984 (aged 21)	5	0	(Royal Moroccan Football Federation) Maghreb Fez
4	DF	Mohamed Ait Abbou	23 August 1985 (aged 19)	5	0	(Royal Moroccan Football Federation) IR Tanger
5	DF	Omar Bendriss	25 May 1984 (aged 21)	5	0	(Royal Moroccan Football Federation) FAR Rabat
6	MF	Yassine Naoum	22 August 1984 (aged 20)	4	0	
7	FW	Youssef Kaddioui	28 September 1984 (aged 20)	5	0	(Royal Moroccan Football Federation) FAR Rabat
8	MF	Mohamed Amine Najmi	23 July 1985 (aged 19)	1	0	
9	FW	Hassan Souari	24 December 1984 (aged 20)	5	0	(Royal Moroccan Football Federation) Khouribga
10	MF	Salaheddine Aqqal	22 August 1984 (aged 20)	5	0	(Royal Moroccan Football Federation) Khouribga
11	MF	Saa Eddine Amal	22 August 1984 (aged 20)	3	0	
12	GK	Mourad Yabka	11 October 1985 (aged 19)	0	0	
13	MF	Abderrazak Barouch	24 March 1984 (aged 21)	5	0	(Royal Moroccan Football Federation) KAC Marrakech
14	DF	Hamza Abourazzouk	16 June 1986 (aged 19)	4	0	(Royal Moroccan Football Federation) Wydad Casablanca
15	MF	Younes Kandoussi	5 February 1984 (aged 21)	2	0	
16	MF	Mostafa Fanoune	10 November 1984 (aged 20)	2	0	(Royal Moroccan Football Federation) Rachad Bernoussi
17	FW	Mohamed Zouidi	3 February 1985 (aged 20)	5	0	
18	DF	Adil Soudassi	11 December 1985 (aged 19)	4	0	

== Group B ==
=== Malta ===
Head coach: (Canada) Silvio Vella

No.	Pos.	Player	Date of birth (age)	Caps	Goals	Club
1	GK	Andrew Hogg	2 March 1985 (aged 20)	2	0	(Malta Football Association) Pietà Hotspurs
2	DF	Alex Muscat	14 December 1984 (aged 20)	2	0	(Malta Football Association) Sliema Wanderers
3	DF	Steve Bezzina	5 January 1987 (aged 18)	1	0	(Malta Football Association) Valletta
4	DF	Josef Mifsud	7 September 1984 (aged 20)	2	0	(Malta Football Association) Msida Saint-Joseph
5	GK	David Camenzuli	24 January 1985 (aged 20)	2	0	(Malta Football Association) Pietà Hotspurs
6	DF	Andrei Agius	12 August 1986 (aged 18)	1	0	(Italian Football Federation) Atletico Catania
7	MF	Clayton Failla	8 January 1986 (aged 19)	2	0	(Malta Football Association) St. Patrick
8	FW	Paul Fenech	20 December 1986 (aged 18)	2	0	(Malta Football Association) Msida Saint-Joseph
9	MF	Mark Gauci	7 January 1986 (aged 19)	2	0	
10	MF	Dyson Falzon	9 March 1986 (aged 19)	2	0	(Malta Football Association) Mosta
11	DF	Matthew Bartolo	14 June 1986 (aged 19)	2	0	(Malta Football Association) Mosta
12	GK	Bernard Paris	7 February 1985 (aged 20)	0	0	(Malta Football Association) Birkirkara
13	MF	Edmond Agius	23 February 1987 (aged 18)	0	0	(Malta Football Association) Hibernians
14	MF	Joel Sammut Vasquez	2 April 1987 (aged 18)	2	0	(Malta Football Association) Birkirkara
15	DF	Kenneth Spiteri	22 March 1986 (aged 19)	1	0	
16	FW	Ryan Fenech	20 April 1986 (aged 19)	2	0	(Malta Football Association) Ħamrun Spartans
17	FW	Andrew Scerri	14 March 1986 (aged 19)	2	0	
18	DF	Jonathan Pearson	23 January 1987 (aged 18)	0	0	(Malta Football Association) Hibernians

=== Spain ===
Head coach: (Spain) Juan Santisteban

No.	Pos.	Player	Date of birth (age)	Caps	Goals	Club
1	GK	Rubén Iván Martínez	22 June 1984 (aged 21)	2	0	(Royal Spanish Football Federation) Barcelona
2	DF	Javier Flaño	19 August 1984 (aged 20)	2	0	(Royal Spanish Football Federation) Osasuna
3	DF	Iván Ramis	25 October 1984 (aged 20)	4	0	(Royal Spanish Football Federation) Mallorca
4	DF	Carlos García	29 April 1984 (aged 21)	4	0	(Royal Spanish Football Federation) Poli Ejido (on loan from Espanyol)
5	DF	Miguel Flaño	19 August 1984 (aged 20)	2	0	(Royal Spanish Football Federation) Osasuna
6	MF	Miki	28 June 1984 (aged 20)	3	0	(Royal Spanish Football Federation) Espanyol
7	MF	Francisco Montañés	8 October 1986 (aged 18)	4	1	(Royal Spanish Football Federation) Barcelona
8	MF	Sergio Torres	2 March 1984 (aged 21)	5	0	(Royal Spanish Football Federation) Atlético Madrid
9	FW	Kepa Blanco	13 January 1984 (aged 21)	4	2	(Royal Spanish Football Federation) Sevilla
10	FW	Manu del Moral	25 February 1984 (aged 21)	5	2	(Royal Spanish Football Federation) Recreativo Huelva (on loan from Atlético Madrid)
11	MF	Antonio Puerta	26 November 1984 (aged 20)	5	2	(Royal Spanish Football Federation) Sevilla
12	FW	Ángel Javier Arizmendi	3 March 1984 (aged 21)	4	1	(Royal Spanish Football Federation) Racing Santander (on loan from Atlético Madrid)
13	GK	Iván Cuéllar	27 May 1984 (aged 21)	3	0	(Royal Spanish Football Federation) Atlético Madrid
14	MF	Gorka Larrea	7 April 1984 (aged 21)	4	0	(Royal Spanish Football Federation) Real Sociedad
15	DF	Jesús Gámez	10 April 1985 (aged 20)	4	2	(Royal Spanish Football Federation) Málaga
16	DF	Javier Tarantino	26 June 1984 (aged 20)	4	0	(Royal Spanish Football Federation) Numancia (on loan from Athletic Bilbao)
17	DF	Juan Valera	21 December 1984 (aged 20)	5	1	(Royal Spanish Football Federation) Murcia
18	MF	Javi Fuego	7 January 1984 (aged 21)	5	0	(Royal Spanish Football Federation) Sporting Gijón

=== Turkey ===
Head coach: (Turkey) Turan Mesci

No.	Pos.	Player	Date of birth (age)	Caps	Goals	Club
1	GK	Bulut Basmaz	6 May 1984 (aged 21)	1	0	(Turkish Football Federation) Altay
2	DF	Feridun Sungur	2 January 1984 (aged 21)	5	0	(Turkish Football Federation) Elazığspor
3	DF	Ramazan Kahya	16 September 1984 (aged 20)	5	0	(Turkish Football Federation) Altay
4	MF	Sezgin Yilmaz	9 July 1984 (aged 20)	1	0	(Turkish Football Federation) Arsinspor
5	DF	Bekir İrtegün	20 April 1984 (aged 21)	3	0	(Turkish Football Federation) Gaziantepspor
6	MF	İbrahim Dağaşan	15 June 1984 (aged 20)	5	0	(Turkish Football Federation) Bursaspor
7	MF	Emre Hamzaoğlu	23 November 1984 (aged 20)	2	0	(Turkish Football Federation) İstanbulspor
8	MF	Doğa Kaya	30 June 1984 (aged 20)	5	0	(Turkish Football Federation) Gençlerbirliği
9	FW	Muhammet Reis	27 October 1984 (aged 20)	5	0	(Turkish Football Federation) Erzurumspor
10	DF	Ertan Aktepe	1 November 1984 (aged 20)	4	0	(Turkish Football Federation) Adana Demirspor (on loan from Samsunspor)
11	MF	Serkan Atak	3 January 1984 (aged 21)	5	0	(Turkish Football Federation) Gaziantepspor
12	GK	Volkan Babacan	11 August 1988 (aged 16)	4	0	(Turkish Football Federation) Fenerbahçe
13	MF	Arda Turan	30 January 1987 (aged 18)	5	0	(Turkish Football Federation) Galatasaray
14	MF	Soner Sakarya	12 March 1984 (aged 21)	4	0	(Turkish Football Federation) Eskişehirspor (on loan from Manisaspor)
15	DF	Serdar Kurtuluş	23 July 1987 (aged 17)	1	0	(Turkish Football Federation) Bursaspor
16	FW	Cafercan Aksu	5 January 1987 (aged 18)	5	0	(Turkish Football Federation) Galatasaray
17	DF	Can Arat	21 January 1984 (aged 21)	5	0	(Turkish Football Federation) Sivasspor (on loan from Fenerbahçe)
18	DF	Serhat Akyüz	10 August 1984 (aged 20)	5	0	(Turkish Football Federation) İstanbulspor

== Group C ==
=== Algeria ===
Head coach: (Algeria) Meziane Ighil

No.	Pos.	Player	Date of birth (age)	Caps	Goals	Club
1	GK	Mohamed Lamine Zemmamouche	19 March 1985 (aged 20)	3	0	(Algerian Football Federation) USM Alger
2	DF	Belkacem Remache	12 October 1985 (aged 19)	2	0	(Algerian Football Federation) AS Khroub
3	DF	Benamar Belabbès	20 April 1985 (aged 20)	3	0	(French Football Federation) RCO Agde
4	MF	Farid Cheklam	21 September 1984 (aged 20)	3	0	(Algerian Football Federation) ASO Chlef
5	FW	Lazhar Hadj Aïssa	23 March 1984 (aged 21)	3	0	(Algerian Football Federation) ES Sétif
6	DF	Sofiane Herkat	26 January 1984 (aged 21)	2	0	(Algerian Football Federation) USM El Harrach
7	MF	Fahem Ouslati	14 March 1986 (aged 19)	3	0	(Algerian Football Federation) CR Belouizdad
8	MF	Tayeb Berramla	6 January 1985 (aged 20)	3	0	(Algerian Football Federation) ASM Oran
9	FW	Sofiane Hanitser	20 November 1984 (aged 20)	3	0	(Algerian Football Federation) ASM Oran
10	DF	Kheireddine Zarabi	18 July 1984 (aged 20)	1	0	(Algerian Football Federation) RC Kouba
11	DF	Mohamed Boussefiane	18 January 1985 (aged 20)	1	0	(Algerian Football Federation) RC Kouba
12	DF	Lhoussine Ould Blal	12 February 1985 (aged 20)	3	0	(French Football Federation) Paris FC
13	MF	Farid Boutadjine	18 August 1984 (aged 20)	1	0	(French Football Federation) Entente SSG
14	MF	Nacereddine Khoualed	16 April 1986 (aged 19)	3	0	(Algerian Football Federation) US Biskra
15	MF	Abdelmadjid Benatia	12 December 1984 (aged 20)	3	0	(Algerian Football Federation) MC Oran
16	GK	Salah Sahraoui	28 March 1984 (aged 21)	0	0	(Algerian Football Federation) MSP Batna
17	MF	Hocine Metref	1 January 1984 (aged 21)	3	0	(Algerian Football Federation) USM Alger
18	MF	Bouazza Feham	11 April 1986 (aged 19)	2	0	(Algerian Football Federation) ASM Oran

=== Greece ===
Head coach: (Greece) Stylianos Aposporis

No.	Pos.	Player	Date of birth (age)	Caps	Goals	Club
1	GK	Konstantinos Andriolas	1 May 1985 (aged 20)	2	0	(Hellenic Football Federation) Halkidona
2	DF	Thanasis Moulopoulos	9 June 1985 (aged 19)	2	0	(Hellenic Football Federation) Ethnikos Asteras
3	DF	Grigoris Papazaharias	20 March 1985 (aged 20)	3	0	(Hellenic Football Federation) Iraklis
4	DF	Vasilis Torosidis	10 June 1985 (aged 19)	3	0	(Hellenic Football Federation) Xanthi
5	DF	Christos Pipinis	1 November 1984 (aged 20)	3	0	(Hellenic Football Federation) Akratitos
6	MF	Nikolaos Karabelas	20 December 1984 (aged 20)	3	0	(Hellenic Football Federation) Paniliakos
7	MF	Themistoklis Tzimopoulos	20 November 1985 (aged 19)	1	0	(Hellenic Football Federation) Akratitos
8	MF	Dimitrios Gkikas	4 April 1984 (aged 21)	2	0	
9	FW	Petros Konteon	9 May 1984 (aged 21)	2	0	(Hellenic Football Federation) Niki Volos (on loan from PAOK)
10	MF	Kostas Mendrinos	28 May 1985 (aged 20)	3	0	(Hellenic Football Federation) Olympiacos
11	MF	Nikos Arabatzis	10 March 1984 (aged 21)	2	0	(Hellenic Football Federation) Panserraikos
12	GK	Orestis Karnezis	11 July 1985 (aged 19)	1	0	(Hellenic Football Federation) OFI
13	MF	Stefanos Kapias	15 February 1984 (aged 21)	1	0	(Hellenic Football Federation) Apollon Kalamarias
14	FW	Georgios Gravanis	30 September 1985 (aged 19)	3	0	
15	DF	Avraam Papadopoulos	3 December 1984 (aged 20)	3	0	(Hellenic Football Federation) Aris
16	MF	Dimitrios Tsitsomitsos	10 May 1985 (aged 20)	0	0	(Hellenic Football Federation) Anagennisi Arta
17	FW	Georgios Katsaros	19 January 1984 (aged 21)	3	0	(Hellenic Football Federation) Panachaiki
18	MF	Efstathios Rokas	18 September 1984 (aged 20)	3	0	(Hellenic Football Federation) Ionikos

=== Tunisia ===
Head coach: (Tunisia) Khemais Abidi

No.	Pos.	Player	Date of birth (age)	Caps	Goals	Club
1	GK	Ali Klay		2	0	
2	MF	Maouia Kadri		3	0	
3	DF	Wissam El Bekri	16 June 1984 (aged 21)	2	0	(French Football Federation) Châteauroux
4	FW	Maher Ameur	7 February 1987 (aged 18)	2	0	(Tunisian Football Federation) Club Africain
5	DF	Aymen Ben Amor	7 September 1985 (aged 19)	3	0	(Tunisian Football Federation) CS Sfaxien
6	DF	Khaled Souissi	20 May 1985 (aged 20)	3	0	(Tunisian Football Federation) Club Africain
7	MF	Youssef Mouihbi	1 April 1985 (aged 20)	2	0	(Tunisian Football Federation) AS Marsa
8	MF	Khaled Melliti	22 May 1984 (aged 21)	2	0	(Tunisian Football Federation) Étoile du Sahel
9	FW	Hamza Younés	16 April 1986 (aged 19)	2	0	(Tunisian Football Federation) CS Sfaxien
10	MF	Ahmed Ben Yahia	5 May 1985 (aged 20)	2	0	(Tunisian Football Federation) Espérance de Tunis
11	MF	Mohamed Labidi		3	0	
12	FW	Raouf Gabsi	23 February 1984 (aged 21)	2	0	(Tunisian Football Federation) Espérance de Tunis
13	MF	Wissem Ben Yahia	9 September 1984 (aged 20)	3	0	(Tunisian Football Federation) Club Africain
14	MF	Chaker Zouagi	10 January 1985 (aged 20)	2	0	(Tunisian Football Federation) Étoile du Sahel
15	DF	Hamdi Mabrouk	5 January 1986 (aged 19)	1	0	(Tunisian Football Federation) US Monastir
16	GK	Ben Ali Majed		1	0	
17	DF	Mohamed Ali Gharzoul	14 December 1985 (aged 19)	3	0	(French Football Federation) Toulouse
18	DF	Karim Touati	20 March 1985 (aged 20)	2	0	
