= 2006–07 Moroccan Throne Cup =

Tournament details
- Country: Morocco

Final positions
- Champions: FAR de Rabat (9th title)
- Runners-up: Rachad Bernoussi

The 2006–07 Moroccan Throne Cup was the 51st edition of the Moroccan cup competition, and was won by FAR de Rabat, who beat Rachad Bernoussi in the final.

== 5th Round ==
Date	Team 1	Team 2	Result
27 January 2007	FUS de Rabat (D2)	Stade Marocain (D2)	3–0
27 January 2007	Union de Mohammédia (D2)	Wafa Wydad (D2)	0–0 (5–4 pens)
28 January 2007	Chabab Mohammédia (D2)	Rachad Bernoussi (D2)	0–0 (1–3 pens)
28 January 2007	Wifak Segangan (D4)	Hilal de Nador (D2)	0–1
28 January 2007	Renaissance Berkane (D2)	Chabab Rif Hoceima (D3)	1–1 (3–4 pens)
28 January 2007	Amal Azrou (D3)	Najah Meknès (D3)	0–0 (4–3 pens)
27 January 2007	Âmal Belksiri (D3)	Union Sidi Kacem (D2)	0–1
27 January 2007	Amal Mansouria (D3)	KAC Kénitra (D2)	1–0
28 January 2007	Hassania Benslimane (D3)	Tihad Témara (D2)	0–0 (3–5 pens)
28 January 2007	Renaissance de Settat (D2)	Raja de Beni Mellal (D3)	2–0
27 January 2007	Amal Souk Sebt (D3)	Chez Ali Marrakech (D3)	1–3
28 January 2007	Chabab Houara (D2)	Mouloudia Laâyoune (D3)	4–2
28 January 2007	Fath Inzegane (D4)	Union Aït Melloul (D3)	3–1
28 January 2007	Youssoufia Berrechid (D2)	Association Enouacer (D4)	1–0
28 January 2007	Perle Bleue Saaidia (D4)	Union de Touarga (D2)	0–5
27 January 2007	ASOF Professionnelle (D3)	Racing Casablanca (D2)	0–0 (4–5 pens)

== Last 32 ==
Date	Team 1	Team 2	Result
10 February 2007	Moghreb de Tétouan (D1)	Amal Azrou (D3)	4–0
10 February 2007	AS Salé (D1)	Ittihad Khémisset (D1)	1–0
10 February 2007	FUS de Rabat (D2)	Maghreb de Fès (D1)	1–2
10 February 2007	Rachad Bernoussi (D2)	Renaissance de Settat (D2)	2–0
10 February 2007	Youssoufia Berrechid (D2)	Difaâ d'El Jadida (D1)	0–0 (4–5 pens)
10 February 2007	OC Khouribga (D1)	Union de Mohammédia (D2)	2–0
10 February 2007	CACAS Marrakech (D3)	Fath Inzegane (D4)	4–3
10 February 2007	Kawkab de Marrakech (D1)	Hassania d'Agadir (D1)	1–1 (4–3 pens)
11 February 2007	Amal Mansouria (D3)	Chabab Rif Hoceima (D3)	3–2
11 February 2007	Chabab Houara (D2)	Olympique de Safi (D1)	0–1
25 February 2007	Jeunesse El Massira (D1)	Wydad de Casablanca (D1)	1–2
11 February 2007	ASOF Professionnelle (D3)	Raja de Casablanca (D1)	0–4
11 February 2007	CODM de Meknès (D1)	Union de Touarga (D2)	1–1 (2–3 pens)
11 February 2007	Union Sidi Kacem (D2)	FAR de Rabat (D1)	0–1
11 February 2007	Hilal de Nador (D2)	Tihad Témara (D2)	0–1
11 February 2007	Ittihad Tanger (D1)	Mouloudia d'Oujda (D1)	0–1

== Last 16 ==
Date	Team 1	Team 2	Result
17 March 2007	Chez Ali Marrakech (D3)	Raja de Casablanca (D1)	0–1
18 March 2007	Kawkab de Marrakech (D1)	Olympique de Safi (D1)	3–2
6 June 2007	Wydad de Casablanca (D1)	Difaâ d'El Jadida (D1)	2–1
17 March 2007	Rachad Bernoussi (D2)	OC Khouribga (D1)	0–0 (5–4 pens)
6 June 2007	FAR de Rabat (D1)	Maghreb de Fès (D1)	1–0
17 March 2007	Tihad Témara (D2)	Union de Touarga (D2)	1–2
18 March 2007	AS Salé (D1)	Moghreb de Tétouan (D1)	1–2
18 March 2007	Mouloudia d'Oujda (D1)	Amal Mansouria (D3)	1–0

== Quarter-finals ==
Date	Team 1	Team 2	Result
20 October 2007	Raja de Casablanca (D1)	Wydad de Casablanca (D1)	0–2
9 September 2007	Mouloudia d'Oujda (D1)	FAR de Rabat (D1)	0–0 (3–5 pens)
9 September 2007	Union de Touarga (D2)	Kawkab de Marrakech (D1)	1–2
9 September 2007	Rachad Bernoussi (D2)	Moghreb de Tétouan (D1)	1–1 (3–1 pens)

== Semi-finals ==
Date	Team 1	Team 2	Result
3 November 2007	Kawkab de Marrakech	Rachad Bernoussi	3–1
3 November 2007	FAR de Rabat	Wydad de Casablanca	1–1 (4–3 pens)

== Final ==
Teams
Rachad Bernoussi - FAR de Rabat
Score
1–1 (3–5 on penalties)
Date
25 November 2007

Stadium
Fez Stadium
45 000 spectators
Referee
Khalid Rouissi
Goals
29 Atik Chihab (og), 75 Mustapha Allaoui
Team 1
12 Tarik El Jarmouni, 18 Noureddine Kacemi, 27 Atik Chihab, 19 Omar Bendriss, 14 Youssef El Basri, 7 Youssef Kaddioui (25 Yassine Naoum), 5 Abderrahmane Mssassi (21 Mustapha Allaoui), 11 Issam Erraki, 10 Ahmed Ajeddou, 24 Jawad Ouaddouch, 29 Jaouad Akaddar (28 Adil Lotfi)
Team 2
1 Mohamed Goumiri (Soufiane Namir), 2 Soufiane Gadoum, 3 Tarik Lechhab, 4 Soufiane Karam, 5 Zakaria El Ouargui, 8 Ismail Koucham, 9 Zakaria El Ouardi, 14 Anas Laâchir (Frédéric), 7 Samir Zekroumi (Bouchaib Damdam), 11 Houcine Hidagua, 10 Tahar Doghmi
Yellow Cards
Soufiane Gadoum, Zakaria El Ouargui (Rachad Bernoussi)

Noureddine Kacemi (FAR de Rabat)
