= 2003–04 Moroccan Throne Cup =

Tournament details
- Country: Morocco
- Dates: 26 June – 28 November 2004

Final positions
- Champions: FAR de Rabat (8th title)

The Moroccan Throne Cup was won by FAR de Rabat, who beat Wydad AC in the final.

== Quarter-finals ==
Date	Team 1	Score	Team 2
26 June 2004	FUS de Rabat	1–0	Raja de Casablanca
27 June 2004	Olympique Dcheira	1–2	Wydad AC
27 June 2004	FAR de Rabat	1–0	Union de Touarga
27 June 2004	JS Massira	2–1	Hassania d'Agadir

== Semi-finals ==
Date	Team 1	Score	Team 2
11 September 2004	FAR de Rabat	1–0	JS Massira
12 September 2004	Wydad AC	2–0	FUS de Rabat

== Final ==
28 November 2004

FAR de Rabat	0–0 after extra time, 3–0 on penalties	Wydad AC

Prince Moulay Abdellah Stadium, Rabat
Attendance: 67 000 spectators
Referee: Slimane Brahmi

FAR de Rabat	Wydad AC
Tarik El Jarmouni; Hassan El Mouataz; Noureddine Boubou; Omar Bendriss; El Houssaine Ouchla; Faouzi El Brazi; Khalid El Maâroufi; Hafid Abdessadak; Ahmed Ajeddou; Abdessamad Bouzidi (Youssef Kaddioui); Mohamed Armoumen (Hicham Zerouali);	Nadir Lamyaghri; Jean-Jacques Gosso; Lahcen Abrami, Samir Sersar, Mohammed Benchrifa, Hicham Louissi, Mourad Fellah (Khama), Mohamed Madihi (Chemssedine Janabi), Youssef Mariana, Mohmmed Benhalib, Mustafa Talha
