= Ditullio =

Ditullio (or Di Tullio) is an Italian surname. Notable people with the surname include:

- Janine Ditullio, American comedy writer, voice actress, and comedian
- Jason Di Tullio (1984–2022), Canadian soccer player and coach
- Juliana Di Tullio (born 1971), Argentine psychologist and politician
