= Chihab =

Chihab is a surname. Notable people with the surname include:

- Atik Chihab (born 1982), Moroccan footballer
- Tariq Chihab (born 1975), Moroccan footballer
- Zakaria Chihab (1926–1984), Lebanese wrestler

== See also ==
- Chihab al-Umari (1301–1349), Arab historian, born in Damascus
