= Ali Bouabe =

Moroccan footballer

Personal information
- Date of birth: March 7, 1979 (age 47)
- Place of birth: Kenitra, Morocco
- Height: 1.87 m (6 ft 2 in)
- Position: Defender

Team information
- Current team: Lokeren
- Number: 14

Senior career*
| Years | Team | Apps | (Gls) |
| 1998–2000 | Kenitra AC | | |
| 2000–2006 | FAR Rabat | | |
| 2006–2009 | Lokeren | 40 | (1) |
| 2010– | FUS Rabat | | |

International career
| 2002 | Morocco | 1 | (0) |
- * Club domestic league appearances and goals

Ali Bouabe (born March 7, 1979) is a Moroccan footballer who played in defence.

== Career ==
Bouabe currently plays for K.S.C. Lokeren Oost-Vlaanderen, as a midfielder.

During his professional career, Bouabé represented local KAC Kenitra (2000–03), FAR Rabat (2003–04), moving subsequently to Belgium with K.S.C. Lokeren Oost-Vlaanderen. After four years in Belgium, Bouabé came back to Morocco to sign with FUS Rabat.

== International career ==
Bouabe made five appearances for the Moroccan national team before his retirement.
