= Mohammed Amine Kabli =

Moroccan footballer

Mohammed Kabli
Personal information
- Full name: Mohammed Amine Kabli
- Date of birth: 21 December 1980 (age 45)
- Place of birth: Casablanca, Morocco
- Height: 1.74 m (5 ft 8 1/2 in)
- Position: Midfielder

Team information
- Current team: FAR Rabat

Youth career
- 1992–1993: Raja Casablanca
- 1993–1997: FUS Rabat

Senior career*
| Years | Team | Apps | (Gls) |
| 1997–2000 | FUS Rabat | | |
| 2000–2006 | AS Salé | | |
| 2006–2008 | Moghreb Tétouan | | |
| 2008– | FAR Rabat | | |
- * Club domestic league appearances and goals as of 16 April 2009 ‡ National team caps and goals as of 17 October 2008

Mohammed Kabli is a Moroccan footballer. He usually plays midfielder and is a member of FAR Rabat.

Kabli has played for Moghreb Tétouan, whom he joined from AS Salé in August 2006. He won the 2008 Coupe du Trône with FAR Rabat.

He has been called into camp for the Morocco national football team.
