= Mourad Fellah =

Moroccan footballer

Mourad Fallah
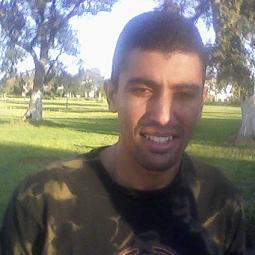
- Fellah in 2008

Personal information
- Date of birth: June 8, 1976 (age 50)
- Place of birth: Casablanca, Morocco
- Height: 1.83 m (6 ft 0 in)
- Position: Defender

Youth career
- 1998–1999: Raja Casablanca

Senior career*
Years	Team	Apps	(Gls)
1999–2000	JS Massira		
2000–2004	Maghreb de Fès		
2004–2007	Wydad Casablanca		
2008–2012	FAR Rabat		
2012–2013	Wydad de Fès		

International career
2002–2007	Morocco	4	(0)
2007–2009	Morocco A	3	(0)
- * Club domestic league appearances and goals as of May 1, 2007

Mourad Fallah (Arabic: مراد فلاح; born June 8, 1976, in Casablanca) is a former Moroccan footballer.

== Honours ==
MAS Fez

- Moroccan Throne Cup Runner up: 2001, 2002

Wydad Casablanca

- Botola: 2005–06
- Moroccan Throne Cup Runner up: 2004

FAR Rabat

- Botola: 2007–08
- Moroccan Throne Cup: 2008, 2009
