= Faouzi El Brazi =

Moroccan footballer (born 1977)

Personal information
- Date of birth: 22 May 1977 (age 49)
- Place of birth: Berkane, Morocco
- Height: 1.82 m (6 ft 0 in)
- Position: Defender

Senior career*
Years	Team	Apps	(Gls)
1999–2000	Servette	11	(1)
2001–2003	Twente	12	(3)
2003–2005	FAR Rabat	28	(0)
2005–2006	Wydad Casablanca	31	(0)
2006–2007	Istres	24	(0)
2007–2009	Wydad Casablanca		
2009–2010	Istres	18	(0)
2012–2013	Nahdat Berkane	3	(0)
Total		101	(4)

International career
2000–2006	Morocco	15	(0)
- * Club domestic league appearances and goals

Faouzi El Brazi (Arabic: فوزي البرازي, born 22 May 1977 in Berkane) is a retired Moroccan footballer.

El Brazi played for Morocco at the 2000 Summer Olympics.
