= Domenico Citro =

Italian footballer (born 1984)

Personal information
- Date of birth: 17 September 1984 (age 42)
- Place of birth: Avellino, Italy
- Height: 1.82 m (5 ft 11 1/2 in)
- Positions: Full back; winger

Youth career
- Parma

Senior career*
Years	Team	Apps	(Gls)
2004–2006	Carrarese	75	(1)
2006–2007	Manfredonia	17	(0)
2007–2009	Carrarese	58	(2)
Total		150	(3)

International career
2000	Italy U15	4	(0)
2005	Italy Mediterranean	3	(0)
- * Club domestic league appearances and goals

Domenico Citro (born 17 September 1984) is an Italian footballer who played in the third and fourth tiers of football in Italy.

== Biography ==
Born in Avellino, Campania, Citro started his career with Emilia side Parma, as first as a midfielder. In January 2004 he left for Serie C2 side Carrarese in co–ownership deal, where he spent 4 1/2 Serie C2 seasons. Parma also gave up the remain 50% registration rights to Carrarese in June 2005. He also spent 1 season with Serie C1 side Manfredonia, signed a reported 2–year contract.

He returned to Carrarese in August 2007.

=== International career ===
Citro capped for Italy at U15 level (the feeder team of U16 team, now U17 team). In November 2004 he received a call-up from Italy under-21 Lega Pro representative team against England C, but as unused bench. He also selected to annual Serie C Quadrangular Tournament, but for Serie C2/B U21 representative team in February 2005.

In June 2005, he was selected to Italy U21 B team which specially for 2005 Mediterranean Games, and for a preparation match against Serie D Best XI. He started both match against Morocco and Libya, but both replaced by Fabio Catacchini at second half.
