= Omar Charef =

Moroccan footballer

Omar Charef (born February 19, 1981) is a Moroccan football goalkeeper.

Charef spent most of his career playing for MC Oujda in the Botola, where he was considered one of the best keepers in the league.

Charef was involved in Morocco's 2004 Olympic football team's build-up to the finals, but did not appear as the team exited in the first round, finishing third in group D, behind group winners Iraq and runners-up Costa Rica.
