= 1994–95 Moroccan Division Nationale I =

Moroccan football league season

Botola
- Season: 1994–95
- Champions: COD Meknès (1st title)

The 1994–95 Botola is the 39th season of the Moroccan Premier League. COD Meknès are the holders of the title.
