= Sébastien Fidani =

French footballer (born 1978)

Personal information
- Date of birth: 4 August 1978 (age 48)
- Place of birth: Tarascon, France
- Position: Forward

Senior career*
Years	Team	Apps	(Gls)
1996–1999	Nîmes	14	(1)
1999–2000	Gazélec Ajaccio	27	(4)
2000–2001	Nîmes	11	(2)
2002–2003	Wasquehal	26	(6)
2003	Sète	5	(2)
2004	Martigues	3	(0)
2005–2006	Gallia Club Lunel		
Total		86	(15)

International career
1993–1994	France U16	4	(1)
1997	France U18	1	(0)
- * Club domestic league appearances and goals

Sébastien Fidani (born 4 August 1978) is a French former professional footballer who played as a forward.

== Career ==
Fidani started his football career with Nîmes and made his professional debut on 17 October 1996, coming on as a substitute and scoring late in a 3–1 home loss at Stade des Costières to AIK in the second round of the 1996–97 UEFA Cup Winners' Cup. The following years he would mainly play at a secondary level in France for Gazélec Ajaccio, Wasquehal, Sète and Martigues, before retiring from football in 2006 as part of Gallia Club Lunel.
