= Yassine Naoum =

Moroccan footballer

Personal information
- Full name: Yassine Naoum
- Date of birth: August 22, 1984 (age 42)
- Place of birth: Casablanca, Morocco
- Position: Midfielder

Youth career
- –2004: TAS de Casablanca

Senior career*
| Years | Team | Apps | (Gls) |
| 2004–2009 | FAR Rabat | | |
| 2009–2011 | Olympique Safi | | |
| 2011 | TAS de Casablanca | | |
| 2011–2012 | Al Sahel | | |
| 2012–2013 | Al-Taawon | | |
| 2013–2014 | Raja Beni Mellal | | |
| 2014–2015 | JS de Kasbah Tadla | | |
| 2015–2017 | Ittihad Khemisset | | |
- * Club domestic league appearances and goals as of April 16, 2009 ‡ National team caps and goals as of October 17, 2008

Yassine Naoum (Arabic: ياسين ناعوم) is a Moroccan footballer. He usually plays as midfielder. Naoum is currently with Al Sahel.

Naoum played for FAR in the 2007 CAF Champions League group stages.
