= Atik Chihab =

Moroccan footballer

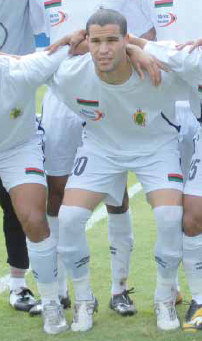

Personal information
- Full name: Atik Chihab
- Date of birth: 25 May 1982 (age 44)
- Place of birth: Casablanca, Morocco
- Position: Defender

Team information
- Current team: FAR Rabat

Youth career
- ?–2002: Racing de Casablanca

Senior career*
Years	Team	Apps	(Gls)
2002–2006	Racing de Casablanca		
2006–2012	FAR Rabat		
2012–2013	IR Tanger		
- * Club domestic league appearances and goals as of April 16, 2009 ‡ National team caps and goals as of October 17, 2008

Atik Chihab is a Moroccan footballer. who last played as a defender for RAC Casablanca.

Chihab played for the FAR Rabat side that won the 2007 Coupe du Trône, the club's ninth, although he scored an own goal in the final against Rachad Bernoussi.
