= Jason Di Tullio =

Canadian soccer player and coach (1984–2022)

Personal information
- Date of birth: January 6, 1984
- Place of birth: Montreal, Quebec, Canada
- Date of death: July 29, 2022 (aged 38)
- Place of death: Montreal, Quebec, Canada
- Height: 5 ft 10 in (1.78 m)
- Position: Defender

Youth career
- 2001–2002: CS Rivière des Prairies

Senior career*
Years	Team	Apps	(Gls)
2002–2007	Montreal Impact	75	(1)

International career
2001	Canada U17	3	(0)
2002–2003	Canada U20	8	(0)

Managerial career
- 2011–2013: Montreal Impact Academy U16
- 2013–2015: Montreal Impact Academy U18
- 2015–2017: Montreal Impact (assistant)
- 2018–2019: FC Lanaudière (Technical Director)
- 2018–2019: Canada U23 (assistant)
- 2019–2020: Montreal Impact Academy U17
- 2021: Montreal Impact U23
- 2021–2022: CF Montreal (assistant)
- * Club domestic league appearances and goals

Jason Di Tullio (January 6, 1984 – July 29, 2022) was a Canadian soccer player and coach.

== Early life ==
Di Tullio played youth soccer with CS Rivière des Prairies.

== Club career ==
Di Tullio began his pro career in 2002 with the Montreal Impact of the USL A-League and later the USL First Division. He scored his only professional goal on July 17, 2002, which was a game-winner against the Vancouver Whitecaps. At the end of his rookie season in 2002, he was awarded the Impact's 2002 Unsung Hero Award. In 2004, he won the league title with the Impact. In 2007, he retired at the age of 23, following his fifth knee surgery since 2004, including missing the entire 2007 season. In total, he played 75 games for the Impact, starting 56, with one goal and four assists.

== International career ==
In 2001, Di Tullio played with Canada at the Jeux de la Francophonie, helping them reach the quarterfinals. He played with the Canada U-17 national team at the 2001 CONCACAF U-17 qualification tournament and helped Canada reach the quarterfinals. Tullio was part of the Canada U-20 national team that played at the 2003 FIFA World Youth Championship.

== Coaching career ==
After his retirement, Di Tullio opened the Football School "École de Soccer DiTullio-Ribeiro" alongside Antonio Ribeiro.

In 2011, he took charge of Montreal Impact Academy U16s. Between 2013 and 2015, he went on to manage the U18s.

In August 2015, he was named assistant coach of the Montreal Impact first team under head coach Mauro Biello. He left the club in October 2017.

In 2018, he was named assistant coach of Canada U20. After a restructuration, he served as the assistant coach of Canada U-23 headed by Mauro Biello.

In July 2018, Di Tullio was named Technical Director of ARS Lanaudière and FC Lanaudière, a soccer region overseeing the development of 14 amateur soccer clubs in the Lanaudière region of Quebec.

In 2019, he announced his return to the Montreal Impact Academy ahead of the 2019 U.S. Soccer Development Academy season, being named head coach of the U-17s.

On September 4, 2020, the Montreal Impact announced the creation of a new U23 team, with Di Tullio becoming the head coach of the club's newly formed reserve team. In March 2021, he returned to the first team (now known as CF Montreal) as an assistant coach.

== Personal life ==
During the 2018 FIFA World Cup, Di Tullio worked as an analyst with Réseau des sports broadcast crew.

In June 2021, Di Tullio was diagnosed with stage 4 glioblastoma. He died on July 29, 2022, at the age of 38, as a result of the cancer.

== Career statistics ==
Appearances and goals by club, season and competition
Club	Season	League			Playoffs		Total	
Club	Season	Division	Apps	Goals	Apps	Goals	Apps	Goals
Montreal Impact	2002	A-League (1995–2004)	24	1	4	0	28	1
Montreal Impact	2003	A-League (1995–2004)	24	0	2	0	26	0
Montreal Impact	2004	A-League (1995–2004)	9	0	0	0	9	0
Montreal Impact	2005	USL First Division	9	0	0	0	9	0
Montreal Impact	2006	USL First Division	9	0	0	0	9	0
Montreal Impact	2007	USL First Division	0	0	0	0	0	0
Career total			75	1	6	0	81	1

== Honours ==
- USL First Division Championship: 2004
- USL First Division Regular Season Championship: 2005, 2006
- Voyageurs Cup: 2002, 2003, 2004, 2005, 2006
