= El Houssaine Ouchla =

Moroccan footballer (born 1970)

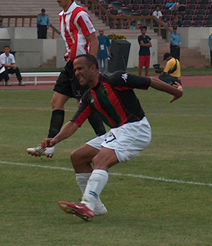
- Ouchla with FAR Rabat

Personal information
- Date of birth: 1 December 1970 (age 55)
- Place of birth: Rabat, Morocco
- Height: 1.76 m (5 ft 9 in)
- Position: Central defender

Senior career*
Years	Team	Apps	(Gls)
1990–2006	FAR Rabat		
2006–2008	Moghreb Tétouan		
2008–2009	FAR Rabat		
2009–2010	Association Salé		
- * Club domestic league appearances and goals

El Houssaine Ouchla (Arabic: الحسين أوشلا; born 1 December 1970 in Rabat) is a retired Moroccan football player. He started his career with FAR Rabat, making his debut in 1990. He joined Moghreb Tétouan in 2006 but returned to FAR Rabat for the 2008-09 season. After one season with Association Salé he retired from playing.

Ouchla was selected by Morocco for the 2006 Africa Cup of Nations, but never made a full international appearance. He was also selected for the Morocco squad in the 2000 Olympic Games and made three appearances in the tournament.
