= Fabio Catacchini =

Italian footballer

Personal information
- Date of birth: 19 January 1984 (age 42)
- Place of birth: Città di Castello, Italy
- Height: 1.85 m (6 ft 1 in)
- Position: Right back

Youth career
- –2002: Parma

Senior career*
Years	Team	Apps	(Gls)
2002–2004	Sansepolcro	63	(4)
2004–2007	Pistoiese	59	(2)
2007–2010	Rimini	85	(1)
2010–2013	Frosinone	68	(0)
2013–2014	Catanzaro	36	(0)
2014–2015	Forlì	34	(1)
2016	Sansepolcro	3	(0)
2016–2017	Prato	32	(0)
2017–2018	Sansepolcro	32	(1)
2018–2019	Trestina	29	(0)
2019–2021	Tiferno 1919		
2021–2023	GS Lama Calcio		
Total		441	(9)

International career
2005	Italy Mediterranean	2	(0)

Managerial career
- 2023–2024: Sansepolcro (youth)
- 2024: Sansepolcro
- 2025–: GS Lama Calcio
- * Club domestic league appearances and goals

Fabio Catacchini (born 19 January 1984) is an Italian football coach and former footballer who is currently as a head coach for GS Lama Calcio.

== Biography ==
=== Early career ===
Born in Città di Castello, Umbria, Catacchini started his career with Emilia–Romagna side Parma, at first as a forward. In 2002, he left for Tuscany side Sansepolcro, where he played 2 Serie D seasons.

=== Pistoiese ===
In mid–2004, he left for Serie C1 side Pistoiese. In although not a regular of the team, he scored 2 goals in 6 league matches (as a winger) and was selected to Italy U21 B team specially for 2005 Mediterranean Games, and for a preparation match against Serie D Best XI. He played the 2 group stage matches Morocco and Libya, both as substitutes for Domenico Citro. He then transformed to play in defender role.

=== Rimini ===
In July 2007 he was signed by Serie B side Rimini. In the first season with the Emilia–Romagna side, he only made 8 start in 21 league appearances. That season Rimini finished as the 7th. In the next season, Rimini made a backward on goalscoring, which the team slipped to relegation zone and lost to Ancona in relegation playout. He played 27 starts that season. Catacchini remained with Rimini in 2009–10 Lega Pro Prima Divisione, played as a regular to reach the promotion playoffs, but lost to Verona in the first round/semi–final. After the season (formally on 16 July) Rimini was expelled from professional league due to its financial record, the club went bankrupt and all players were released.

=== Frosinone ===
On 13 July 2010, he had a medical tests with Serie B side Frosinone and then signed a contract. On 7 August 2010, he played his first official match with team, which Frosinone won the opening match of the season (and the first Cup match of the team). The team won Seconda Divisione newcomer Trapani 3–1.

=== Catanzaro and Forlì ===
In January 2013 he moved to Catanzaro; summer 2014 signing for Forlì.

=== Sansepolcro and Prato ===
He remained free transfer in January 2016 for the signature Sansepolcro in Serie D; only a month later back in the Lega Pro by moving to Prato.

=== Tiferno 1919 ===
In June 2019, Catacchini joined Tiferno 1919.
