= Jawad Ouaddouch =

Moroccan footballer (born 1981)

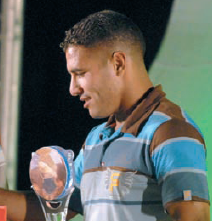

Personal information
- Date of birth: 4 October 1981 (age 45)
- Place of birth: Kasba Tadla, Morocco
- Height: 1.78 m (5 ft 10 in)
- Position: Forward

Youth career
- ?–2002: Club de Kasbate Tadla

Senior career*
Years	Team	Apps	(Gls)
2002–2003	Club de Kasbate Tadla		
2003–2011	AS FAR		
2011–2012	Emirates Ras al-Khaimah		
2012–2013	Wydad de Fès	7	(1)
2014–2015	JS Kasbat Tadla		

International career
2005–2011	Morocco	3	(1)
- * Club domestic league appearances and goals

Jawad Ouaddouch (born 4 October 1981) is a Moroccan former professional footballer who plays as a forward.
