= Mustapha Madih =

Moroccan football manager (died 2018)

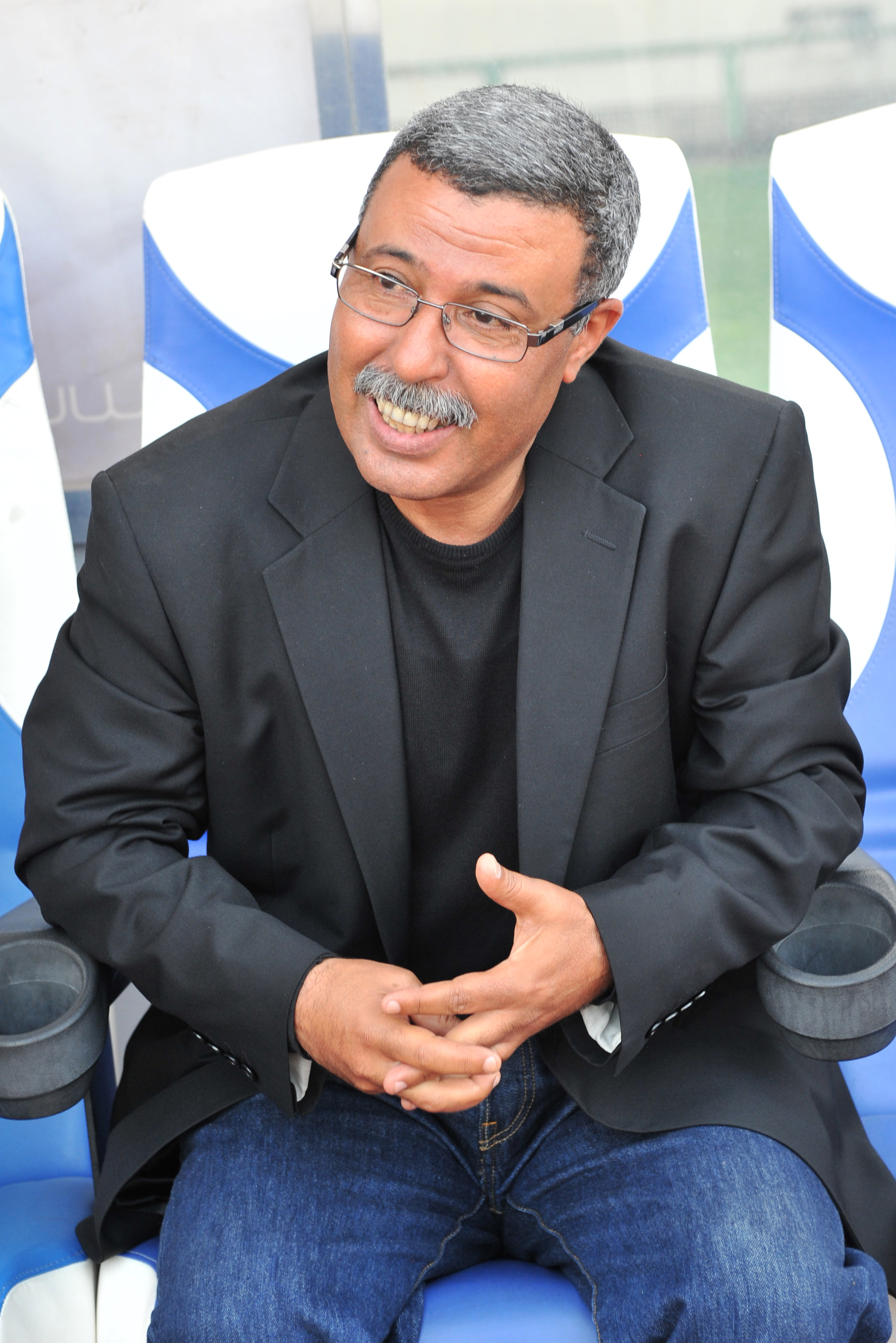
Madih in 2012

Mustapha Madih (died 4 November 2018) was a Moroccan football manager.
