= Mohammed Benchrifa =

Moroccan footballer

Personal information
- Full name: Mohammed Benchrifa
- Date of birth: April 28, 1975 (age 51)
- Place of birth: Casablanca, Morocco
- Position: Defender

Youth career
- Wydad Casablanca

Senior career*
Years	Team	Apps	(Gls)
1995–2003	Wydad Casablanca		
2003–2003	Al-Khor		
2003–2004	Al-Wahda		
2004–2006	Wydad Casablanca		
2006–2009	Moghreb Tétouan		
2009–2013	FUS Rabat		

International career^{‡}
2000–2001	Morocco	3	(0)

Managerial career
- 2021–2022: Wydad AC (assistant)
- 2022: Union Touarga (assistant)
- 2022: RCA Zemamra
- 2023–2024: JS Soualem
- 2025: Moghreb Tétouan
- 2026: Wydad AC
- * Club domestic league appearances and goals as of April 16, 2009 ‡ National team caps and goals as of October 17, 2008

Mohammed Benchrifa (Arabic: محمد بن شريفة) is a Moroccan footballer. He usually played as defender. Benchrifa was recently the head coach of Botola Pro club Wydad Casablanca.
