= Mustapha Allaoui =

Moroccan footballer (born 1983)

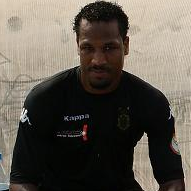

Personal information
- Full name: Mustapha Allaoui
- Date of birth: 30 May 1983 (age 43)
- Place of birth: Fès, Morocco
- Height: 1.89 m (6 ft 2 in)
- Position: Forward

Team information
- Current team: Pluakdaeng United
- Number: 23

Youth career
- Maghreb Fez

Senior career*
Years	Team	Apps	(Gls)
2000–2005	Maghreb Fez	70	(42)
2005–2009	FAR Rabat	32	(24)
2007	→ Al-Khaleej (loan)	14	(22)
2009–2012	Guingamp	19	(9)
2011	→ Wydad Casablanca (loan)	15	(9)
2012	Shenyang Shenbei	10	(6)
2012–	FAR Rabat	15	(7)
2013–2014	Khaitan SC	?	(10)
2014–2015	Al Nasr Koweit		
2015–2016	MC Oujda	21	(3)
2016–2017	Olympique Safi		
2017–2019	JS Massira		
2020–	Pluakdaeng United		

International career
2009	Morocco	6	(0)
- * Club domestic league appearances and goals as of 16:23, 10 May 2020 (UTC)

Mustapha Allaoui (born 30 May 1983) is a Moroccan footballer who plays for Pluakdaeng United in Thailand.

== Career ==
=== Club career ===
Born in Fes, Allaoui began his career for hometown club Maghreb Fez. He later joined FAR Rabat in summer 2005 On 14 August 2009, French Ligue 2 side, Guingamp signed the Moroccan striker from FAR Rabat on a three-year deal.

In February 2020, Allaoui joined Thai League 4 club Pluakdaeng United.

=== International career ===
Allaoui was part of the Moroccan 2004 Olympic football team, who exited in the first round, finishing third in group D, behind group winners Iraq and runners-up Costa Rica. He made a full international debut for Morocco on 12 August 2009 in a friendly against Congo.
