= Omar Bendriss =

Moroccan footballer (born 1984)

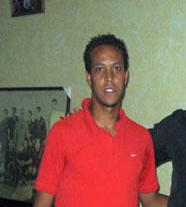

Personal information
- Full name: Omar Bendriss
- Date of birth: 25 May 1984 (age 42)
- Place of birth: Rabat, Morocco
- Height: 1.81 m (5 ft 11 1/2 in)
- Position: Defender

Team information
- Current team: FAR Rabat

Youth career
- –2002: FAR Rabat

Senior career*
Years	Team	Apps	(Gls)
2002–	FAR Rabat		
- * Club domestic league appearances and goals as of 16 April 2009 ‡ National team caps and goals as of 17 October 2008

Omar Bendriss (born 25 May 1984) is a Moroccan footballer. He usually plays as defender. Bendriss is currently attached to FAR Rabat.

Bendriss played for the Morocco national under-20 football team in the 2003 African Youth Championship.
