= AS FAR =

Association football club in Morocco

ASFAR
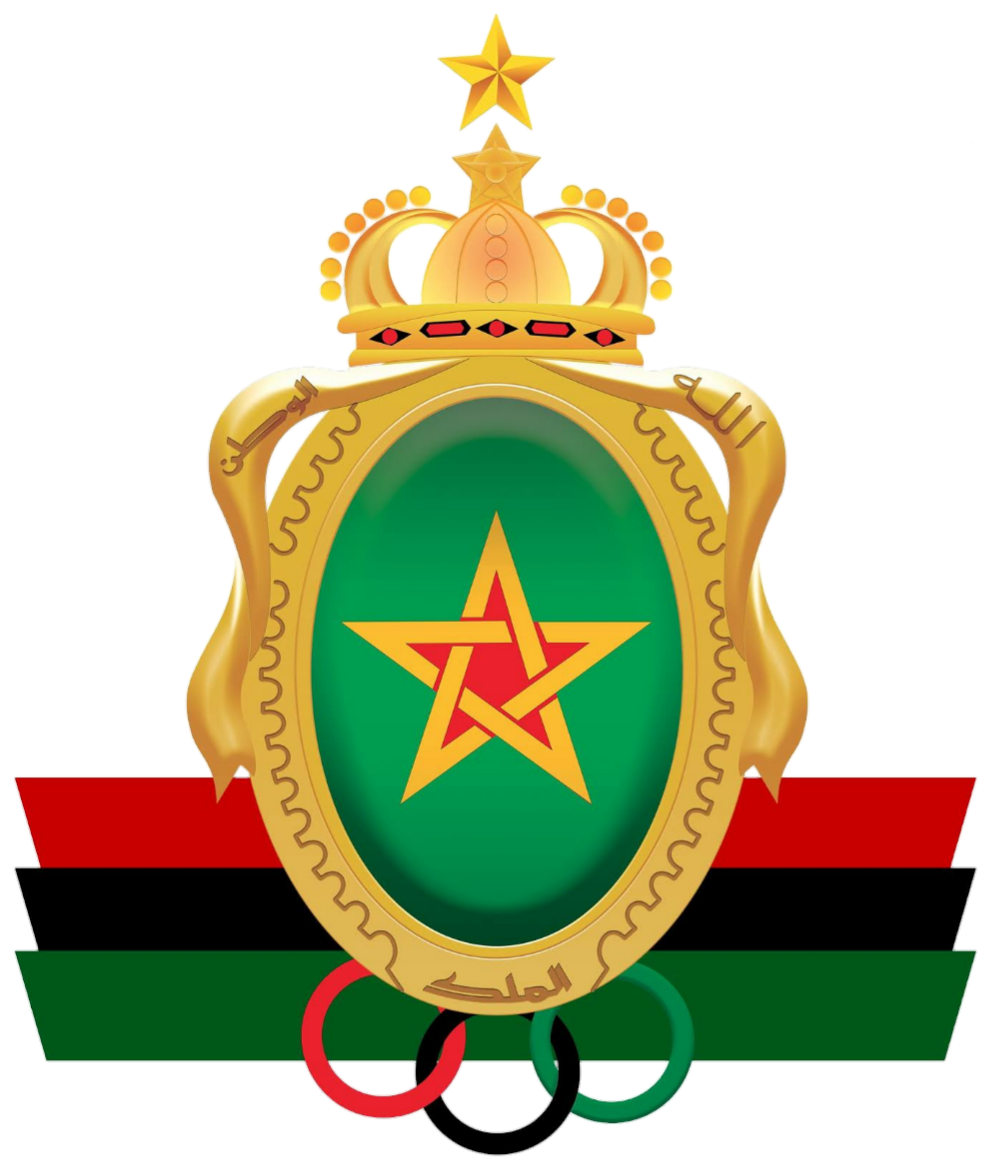
- Full name: Royal Armed Forces Sports Association
- Nicknames: الزعيم (The Leader) العساكر (The Militarians) القلعة الملكية (The Royal Castle)
- Short name: ASFAR
- Founded: 1 September 1958; 68 years ago
- Ground: Prince Moulay Abdellah Stadium
- Capacity: 69,500
- Owner: Royal Moroccan Armed Forces
- President: G. Mohamed Haramou
- Manager: Pedro Gonçalves
- League: Botola Pro
- 2025–26: Botola Pro, 4th of 16
- Website: www.as-far.ma
Home colours	Away colours	Third colours

The Royal Armed Forces Sports Association (French: Association sportive des forces armées royales ASFAR; Arabic: الجمعية الرياضية للقوات المسلحة الملكية), commonly known as AS FAR, is a Moroccan professional football club based in Rabat. Founded on 1 September 1958 at the initiative of then-Crown Prince Moulay Hassan, who served as Supreme Commander of the Royal Moroccan Armed Forces, the club was established to represent the military institution and contribute to the development of Moroccan football. AS FAR competes in Botola Pro, the top tier of Moroccan football, and has never been relegated from the top division since its promotion in the 1959–60 season. The club traditionally wears black, red, and green, and plays its home matches at the Prince Moulay Abdellah Stadium in Rabat.

AS FAR entered official competitions in the second division during the 1958–59 season, winning the Moroccan Throne Cup and earning promotion to the top division before claiming the Moroccan championship in its first season among the elite. The period from 1959 to 1971 marked the club's first golden era, during which it won seven league titles and two Throne Cups, while several of its players became key members of the Morocco national football team. In 1968, AS FAR became the first Moroccan club to participate in an African club competition, reaching the semi-finals of the African Cup of Champions Clubs. In 1985, it became the first Moroccan club to win an African club title by lifting the African Cup of Champions Clubs, before adding its second continental title with the CAF Confederation Cup in 2005.

AS FAR is among the most successful clubs in Morocco and among the clubs with the most titles in the Moroccan Throne Cup. It has won 13 Botola titles and 12 Throne Cups, as well as one CAF Champions League title and one CAF Confederation Cup title, giving it 27 major titles in these four competitions. The club was the first Moroccan team to win the CAF Club Champions Cup in 1985 and the CAF Confederation Cup in 2005. It has also maintained a prominent position in Moroccan football through its sustained presence in the top division and its long record of success in domestic competitions.

AS FAR has one of the largest supporter bases in Morocco, with support extending beyond Rabat to other parts of the country and abroad. Since the mid-2000s, its supporters have been associated with organised ultras groups, notably Ultras Askary 05, founded in 2005, and Black Army 06, founded in 2006. The club has long-standing rivalries with Wydad AC, with whom it contests the Moroccan Classico, and FUS Rabat, with whom it contests the Capital Derby. These rivalries are among the most prominent fixtures involving AS FAR in Moroccan football.

== History ==
=== Early years (1958–1965) ===
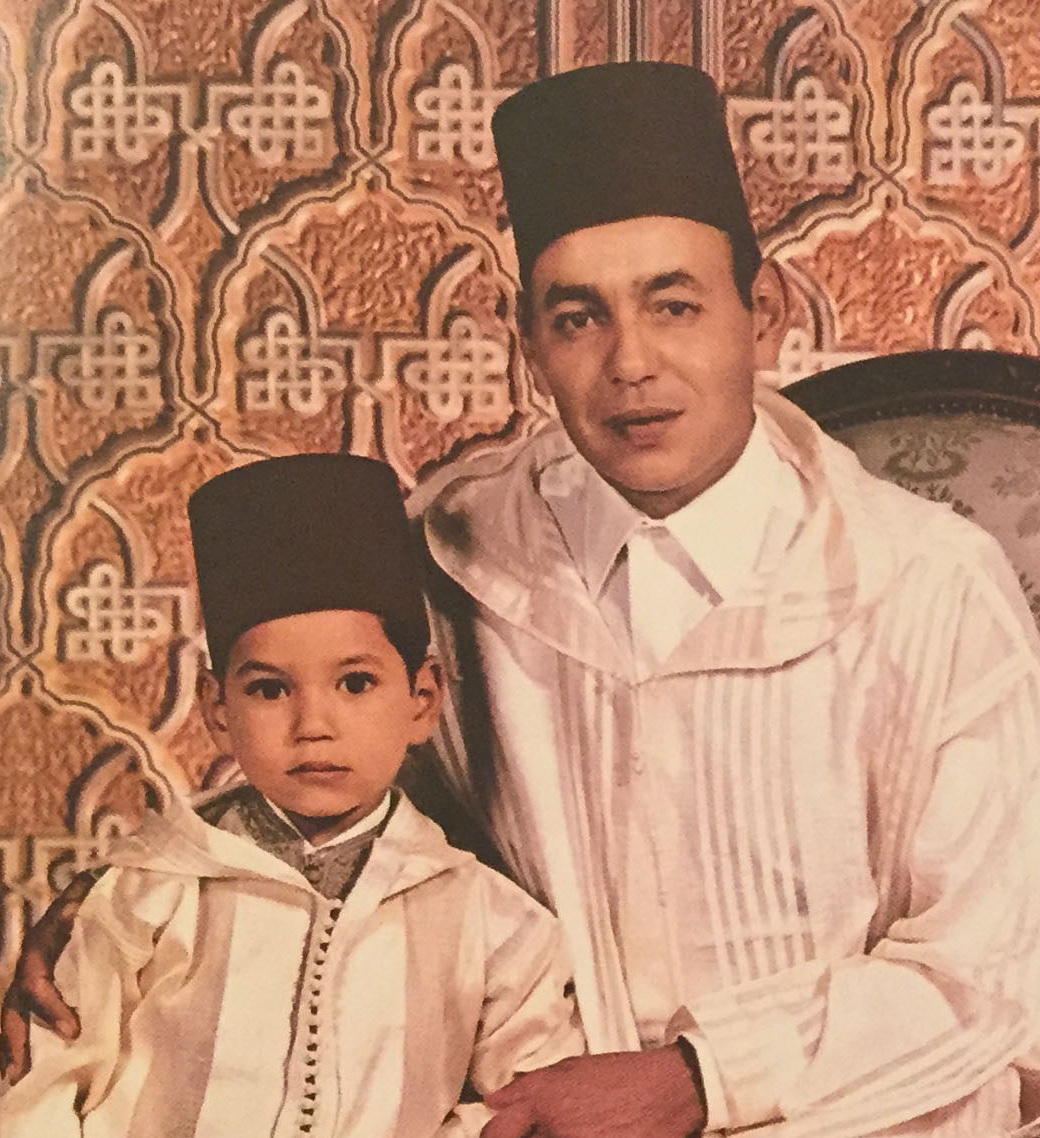
King Hassan II, founder of AS FAR with prince Mohammed

AS FAR was founded on 1 September 1958, by the initiative of the Crown Prince Moulay El Hassan, who was an avid football fan himself, by signing a decree as High Commander of the Moroccan Royal Army. The club scouts and players work with the Royal Armed Forces to develop players in multiple aspects (technical level, fitness management, sportsmanship).

One year after its creation, the football team, while still in the second division, won their first Throne Cup. That same year, the club finished first in the division of the Moroccan Championship. In the Moroccan Throne Cup, they managed to hide in eighths of final and then face the Wydad Casablanca. The latter was beaten by a score of 1–0. During the quarter-finals, the military defeated the Fath Union Sport Rabat at the first Rabat derby, where AS FAR won the match 3–1. The final took place on December 14, 1959, face Mouloudia Oujda won the first two editions of the throne cup and prepares to make a triple while the military, for their first season, a cut of the throne would be the ideal. Finally the AS FAR win this match on the 1–0 score that is stuck at Stade Mohammed V.

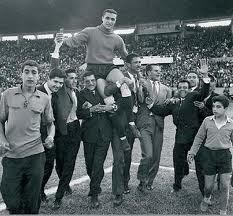
Goalkeeper Housni Benslimane celebrating AS FAR's 1958–59 Moroccan Throne Cup win

The Royal Army's won its second title in less than two years, after it squandered the championship title in a play-off against the KAC Kénitra. The 1964–65 season was known for repeated arbitration mistakes, and the meeting with Maghreb de Fès was the point that overflowed the cup with a disastrous arbitration that directly affected the outcome of the meeting and the fate of the championship title by virtue of the fact that the defeat ended 3-0 and in Rabat, the match with a quarrel between the players and the referee. After the incident, the Royal Moroccan Football Federation took an unfair decision to suspend the club for a full season and thus not participate in the championship and cup for the following season 1965–66. The military team spent a white season away from local stadiums, but it did not stop competing, as it preferred to play international matches against international teams and teams to maintain competitiveness. They played nearly 50 international matches in one season against international teams in various European countries such as Spain, France and Russia, including Cádiz CF, Recreativo de Huelva and Gibraltar, most notably against Barcelona at the Camp Nou on December 25, 1966, which ended with four goals to zero in favor of the Spaniards, while they succeeded in snatching a tie against Atlético Madrid in a match on the occasion of the inauguration of the Vicente Calderón Stadium, ended with a score of 2-2, before the team visited the Soviet Union in two trips, the team drew 1–1 against Dinamo Moscow.

=== Domination of Moroccan football (1965–1984) ===
The Royal Army returned to the atmosphere of competition in the championship, after the banned season. AS FAR was crowned with two other titles immediately after resuming its activity in the championship in 1967 and 1968 and 1970.

In the same period, at the beginning of the sixties, Al-Asaker also took control of the Moroccan Super Cup winning it in four out of six times. Then the Royal Army, led by its French coach Clezo, began to dominate the league competition by winning four titles, and the team's first meeting with the championship title was in the 1960–61 season, and control of the championship title continued for four consecutive seasons until 1964 as a new record.

Internationally and in the same era, the Royal Army team had the honor of participating in the first edition of the Mohammed V Cup in 1962, after winning the league title the same year, the Royal Army was ranked third, after a 5–0 defeat against French club Stade Reims. They were set to face Real Madrid for the third-place position, the match ended in 4–3 victory, thus becoming the first Arab and African team to beat the 20th Century Club.

In their fifth participation, the military team was able to reach the final of the Mohammed V Cup for the first time in 1967, when it eliminated in the semi-finals the Dukla Prague with a score of 1–0, to face the Bulgarian CSKA Sofia in the final, which won the title at the expense of the military team with great difficulty by a score of 1- 0. The military team returned to the Mohammed V Cup final in 1970 for the second time, where they faced the Spanish giant Atlético Madrid, the Royal Army lost 4–1.

AS FAR was the first Moroccan team to participate in African competitions by drawing the 1968 African Cup of Champions Clubs, after winning the league for the same year. With the beginning of the seventies, exactly in 1971, and after an absence of 11 years, the military team, accompanied by its Spanish coach Sabino Barinaga, won the second title of the Moroccan Throne Cup at the expense of Maghreb Fez, after the match ended in a 9-8 penalty shootout victory.

=== First African title (1984–2004) ===
After a 12 year trophyless run, AS FAR achieved the most important victory by winning the championship titles and the Moroccan Throne Cup, despite the short period that José Faria spent as the team's coach.

The Royal Army team entered the African competition, after winning the championship title, by participating in the 1985 African Cup of Champions Clubs. It entered history as the first Moroccan team to win a continental title. the Royal Army team reached the semi-finals of the African Champions League for the second time in its history, where it faced the Egyptian team Zamalek, and the first leg ended with a score of 1-0 from a penalty kick in favor of the Egyptians in Cairo, and the same result was recorded in Rabat from A penalty kick by Shesha before the match was settled by penalty kicks (4–3), which saw the brilliance of goalkeeper Salah El-Din Hamid, who gave the team qualification for the final round by blocking two penalties, and the joy was not yet complete. In the final, the FAR team faced AS Bilima, the champions of the Democratic Republic of the Congo, and despite the injury of Timoumi and Abdeslam Laghrissi, the first leg match in Rabat ended with a great victory for the military team, 5–2. The away game ended in a 1–1 draw which gifted the Royal Army their first CAF Champions League title. After this historical achievement, Hassan II of Morocco insisted on receiving the military team at his residence in the suburbs of the French capital, Paris, after this first African coronation of its kind. The team is an exceptional congratulations from King Hassan II. The team went on to win three Throne Cup in a row. The Royal Army became the second team to have the honor of keeping the cup in its treasury after Kawkab Marrakech, because the law of the competition grants the winner of the title three times in a row the honor of keeping the Silver Cup permanently. In the 1986 Afro-Asian Club Championship, the first edition of its kind, which was held in Riyadh in January 1987, between the Royal Army, the African champions, and the South Korean club, Busan IPark, the Asian champion, noticed the defeat of AS FAR by a score of 2–0.

Then the Royal Army team embraced the championship title for the second time with Faria in 1987, and in 1989 with Argentine Angelillo, making the military team the first team to reach 10 championships. This generation continued its continental tour by reaching the semi-finals of the 1988 African Cup of Champions Clubs for the third time in the team's history. To the penalty shootout that defined the Nigerian team's superiority, the Royal Army missed another opportunity to cross into the final.

=== The Return (2004–) ===
The Royal Army won two successive titles for the Moroccan Throne Cup in two Clasico matches at the expense of rival Wydad Casablanca, in 2003 with a goal of zero from a header by Hafeez Abdel-Sadiq with a pass from Ahmed, and in the 2004 final, the match ended in a goalless draw, which continued into overtime as well, to decide the penalty shootout, which marked the brilliance of goalkeeper Tariq Al-Jarmouni, and the match ended with the army winning 3–0 on penalties.After a long absence from the championship title that lasted 15 seasons, the military team returned to win its 11th league title in 2005, in a historic match drawing the 30th and last round of the league, in the Mohammed V compound in front of Raja Casablanca, leaders by two points, which needed a draw only to crown the title, but it was The soldiers have another opinion, and the Mohamed Fakhir battalion was able to overthrow Raja and win a clean double signed by Mohamed Armoumen, who also won the top scorer title. The army took the championship title from the city of Casablanca amid a great public astonishment for the opponent and the great joy of the soldiers, where the meeting was titled in the 21st century match in the Moroccan championship.

After 20 years of winning its first African title, the FAR team won the CAF Confederation Cup in 2005 after defeating the Nigerian Dolphins F.C 3–1 in aggregate. AS FAR later went on to lose the 2006 CAF Super Cup against Al Ahly SC on penalties.

On 2 December 2006, AS FAR lost the 2006 CAF Confederation Cup final after losing to Étoile Sportive du Sahel on an away goal. In 2007, AS FAR won the Throne Cup after defeating Rachad Bernoussi on penalties. Next season, they managed to clinch both domestic titles, the 2008 Botola and the Throne Cup. IN 2009, As far won the Throne Cup after defeating Fath Union Sport on penalties.

After 11 trophyless seasons, AS FAR clinched the 2020 Throne Cup after defeating Moghreb Tétouan 3–0. They qualified to the 2023 CAF Confederation Cup, after a 15-year continental drought. In their return to continental competition, AS FAR topped their group stage, qualifying to the knock out stages. Later to be knocked out in the quarter-finals against USM Alger.

After 15 years, AS FAR won its 13th league title in 2023 after topping the table with 67 points.

== Grounds ==
=== Prince Moulay Abdellah Stadium ===
The original Prince Moulay Abdellah Stadium (Arabic: مركب الأمير مولاي عبد الله) was a multi-purpose stadium in Rabat, Morocco. It was named after Prince Moulay Abdellah of Morocco and built in 1983, the stadium was the home ground of AS FAR. It was used mostly for football matches and it also staged athletics. The stadium had a capacity of 52,000. From 2008 until 2023, it hosted of the Meeting International Mohammed VI d'Athlétisme de Rabat. It was a confirmed venue for the 2015 Africa Cup of Nations until Morocco was stripped of its hosting rights. It was also a venue for the 2014 FIFA Club World Cup and the 2023 FIFA Club World Cup.

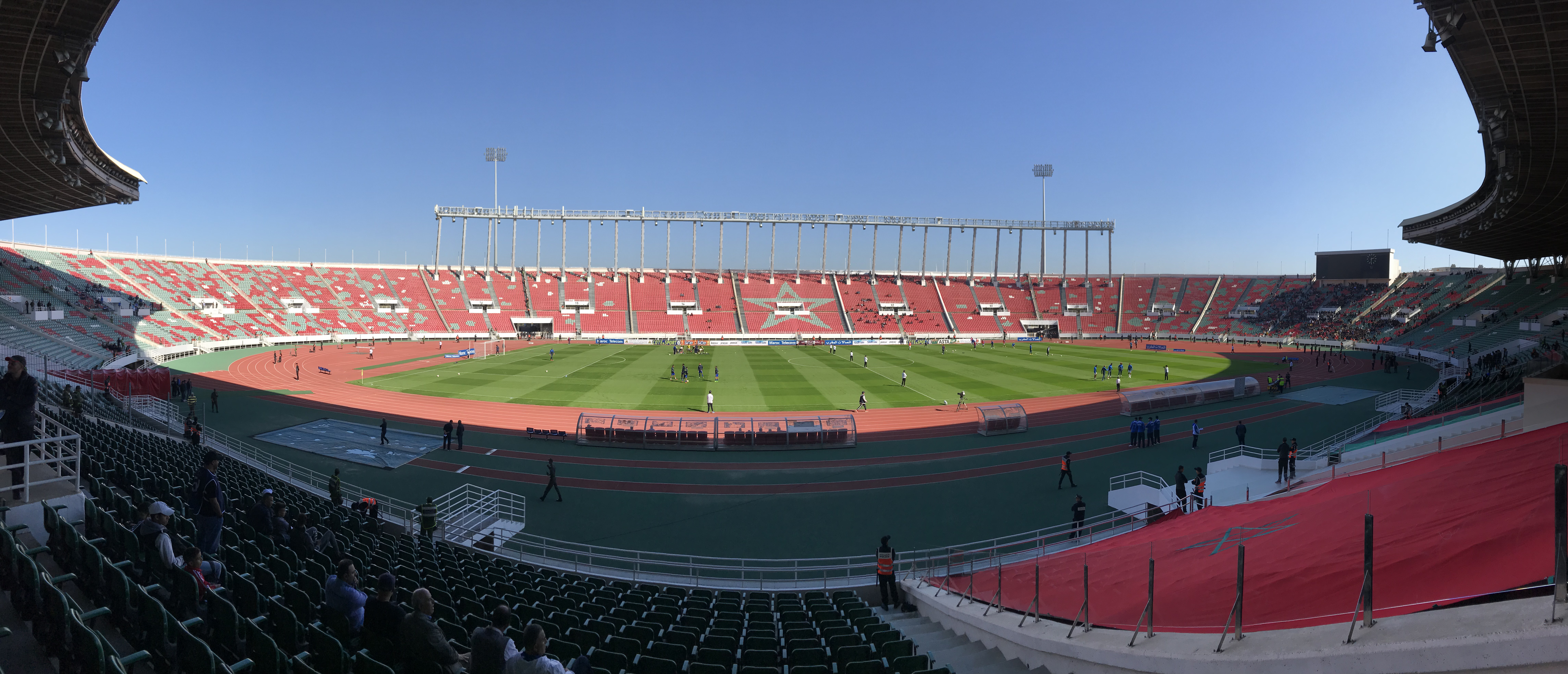
The original Prince Moulay Abdellah Stadium in Rabat, demolished in 2023.

==== Replacement stadium ====
As of 2023, the 1983 Prince Moulay Abdellah Stadium was demolished to make way for a new football stadium on the same site. The new venue with a capacity of 68,700 was constructed to be completed for 2025 in time for the 2025 Africa Cup of Nations, and it will also host matches during the 2030 FIFA World Cup.

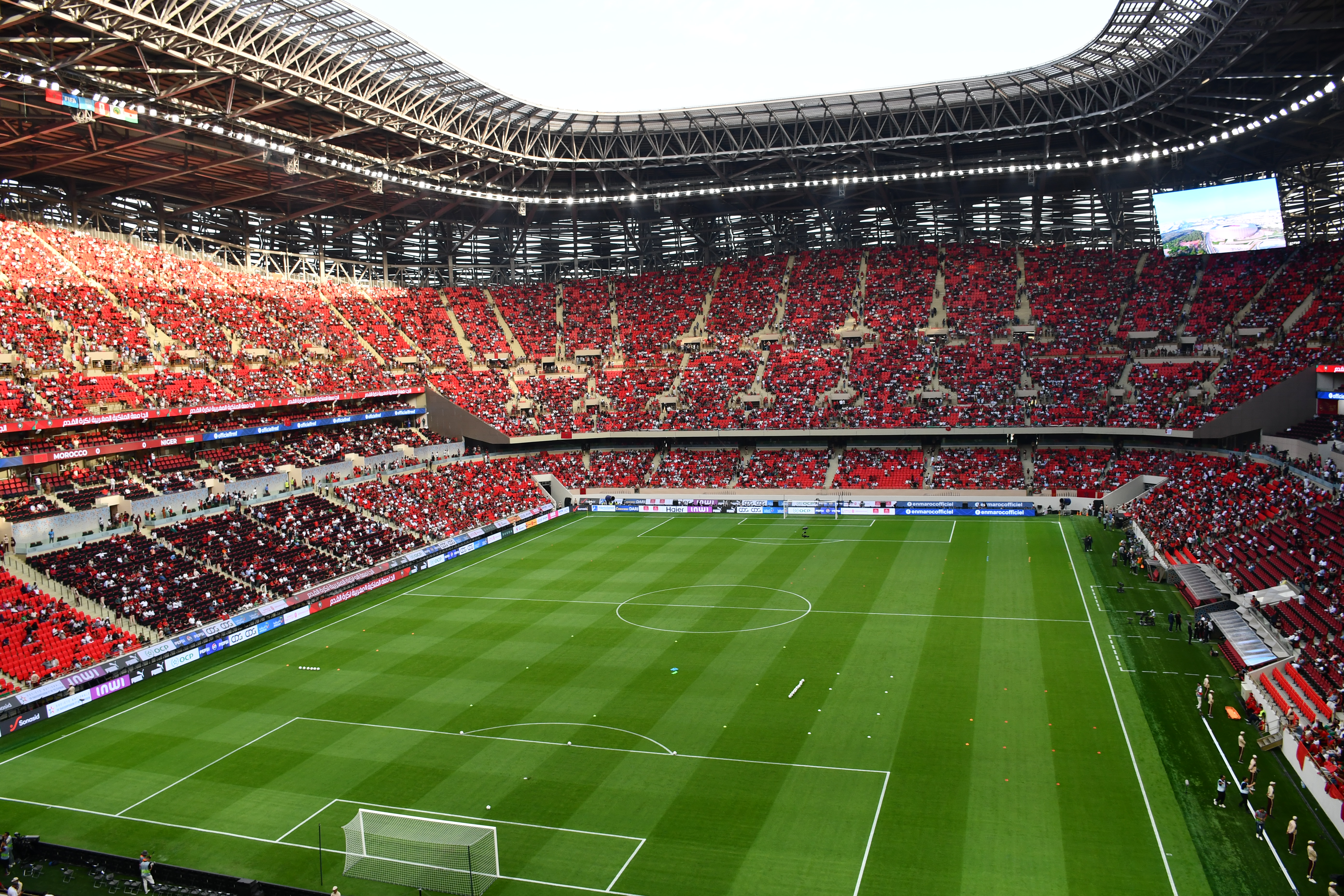
The new Prince Moulay Abdellah Stadium in Rabat

== Honours ==
This is a list of honours for the senior ASFAR team that include a total of 27 Trophies

Type	Competition	Titles	Winning seasons	Runners-up
Domestic	Botola	13	1961, 1962, 1963, 1964, 1967, 1968, 1970, 1984, 1987, 1989, 2005, 2008, 2023	1960, 1971, 1991, 2004, 2006, 2007, 2013, 2024
Domestic	Moroccan Throne Cup	12	1959, 1971, 1984, 1985, 1986, 1999, 2003, 2004, 2007, 2008, 2009, 2020	1988, 1990, 1996, 1998, 2012, 2023
Domestic	Botola 2	1	1959	–
Domestic	Moroccan Youth Cup	1	1959	–
Continent	CAF Champions League	1	1985	2026
Continent	CAF Confederation Cup	1	2005	2006
Continent	CAF Super Cup	0	–	2006
Continent	African Cup Winners' Cup	0	–	1997
Intercontinental	Afro-Asian Club Championship	0	–	1986
Intercontinental	Intercontinental Mohamed-V Cup	0	–	1967, 1970

- record
- ^{S} shared record

=== Other competitions ===
- Trofeo Semana del Sol, Spain
  - Winner (1): 1977
- Trofeo Ciudad de Cordoba, Spain
  - Runners-up (1): 1976
- North African Cup of Champions
  - Runners-up (1): 2008
- International elite championship
  - Runners-up (1): 2008
- Ahmed Antifit Tournament
  - Winner (1): 2007
  - Runners-up (1): 2009

== Top scorers ==
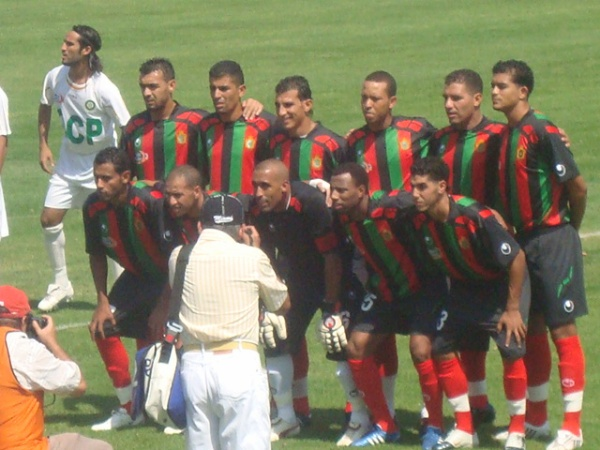
AS FAR Season 2009–10

The AS FAR controls the title of Top scorers in Botola, which has the largest number of scorers a total of 14 times.Morocco - List of Topscorers

=== Top scorers in Botola ===
- Top scorer award winners

Season	Nat	Player	Goals Scored
1980	(Morocco)	Idriss Ouadich	15
1983	(Morocco)	Abdeslam Laghrissi	14
1987	(Morocco)	Abderrazak Khairi	12
1988	(Morocco)	Lahcen Anaflous	17
1990	(Morocco)	Abdeslam Laghrissi	22
1991	(Morocco)	Lahcen Anaflous	15
1992	(Morocco)	Lahcen Anaflous	11
1995	(Morocco)	Abdeslam Laghrissi	15
2005	(Morocco)	Mohamed Armoumen	12
2007	(Morocco)	Jawad Ouaddouch	12
2008	(Morocco)	Abderrazak El Mnasfi	13
2009	(Morocco)	Mustapha Allaoui	14
2011	(Morocco)	Jawad Ouaddouch	11
2016	(Morocco)	Mehdi Naghmi	12
2025	(Morocco)	Youssef El Fahli	11

=== Top scorers in CAF Champions League ===
- All season

Rank	Nat	Player	Goals scored
1	(Morocco)	Abdeslam Laghrissi	11
2	(Morocco)	Abderrazak Khairi	10
3	(Morocco)	Ahmed Hammoudan	6
4	(Morocco)	Mohamed Timoumi	5
5	(Morocco)	Mohamed Ouardi (Chicha)	5
6	(Morocco)	Mustapha Allaoui	5
7	(Morocco)	Abdellah Haidamou	4
8	(Morocco)	Saad Dahane	4
9	(Morocco)	Lahcen Anaflous	4

- Top scorer award winners

Season	Nat	Player	Goals scored
1985	(Morocco)	Saad Dahane	4
1985	(Morocco)	Abdellah Haidamou	4
1985	(Morocco)	Abderrazak Khairi	4
1988	(Morocco)	Abdeslam Laghrissi	7

=== Top scorers in CAF Confederation Cup ===
- All season

Rank	Nat	Player	Goals scored
1	(Morocco)	Jawad Ouaddouch	6
2	(Morocco)	Youssef Kaddioui	5
3	(Cape Verde)	Edilson Borges	5
4	(Morocco)	Hamza Igamane	4
5	(Morocco)	Mustapha Allaoui	3
6	(Morocco)	Mounir Benkassou	3

== Performance in CAF competitions ==
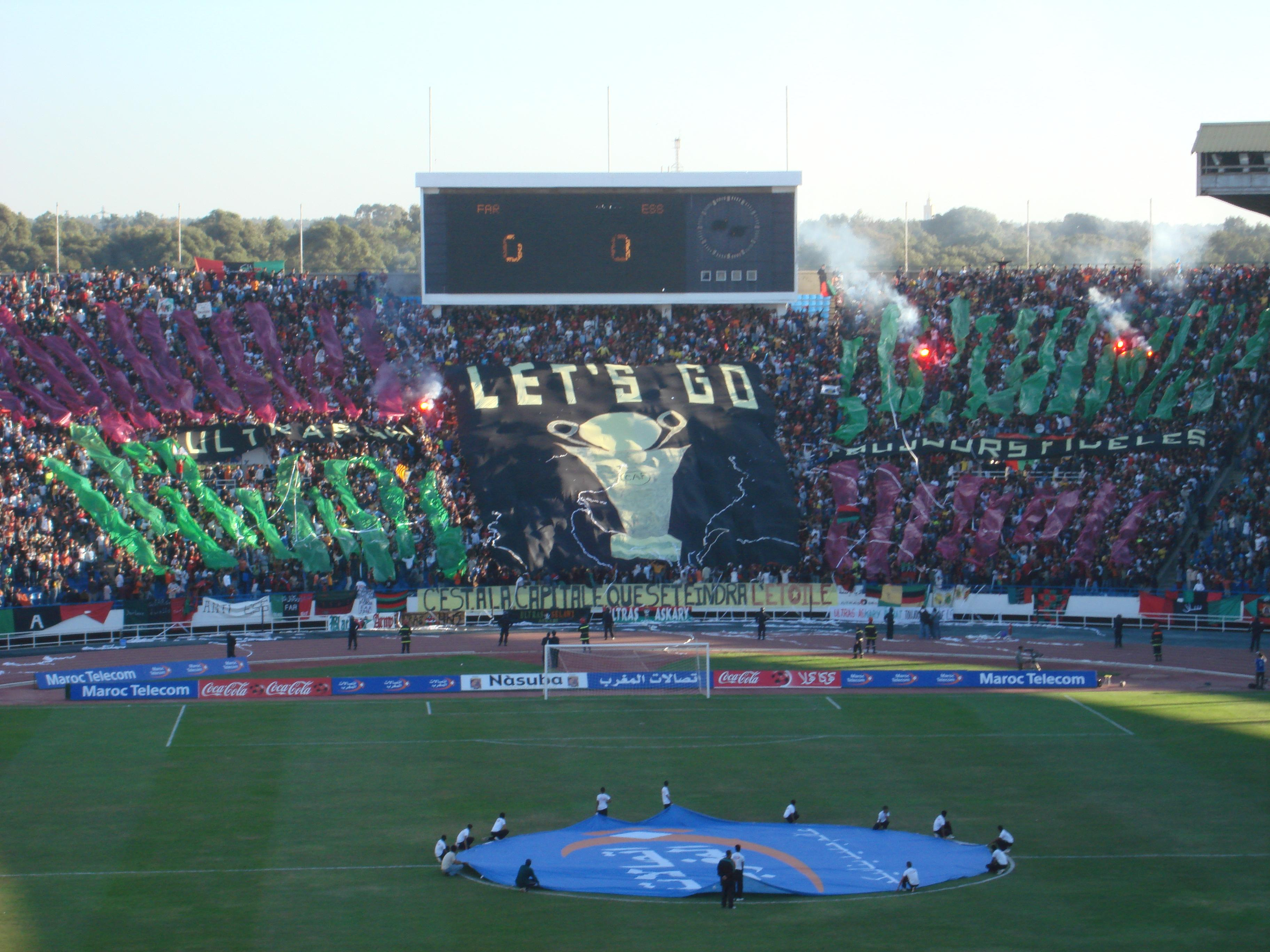
Final of the CAF Cup 2006

At the continental level, AS FAR is the first Moroccan club to have participated in an African Cup; in 1968, when it reached the semi-finals of the African Cup of Champions Clubs. It was also the first Moroccan club to win the CAF Champions League, in 1985.

- CAF Champions League: 13 appearances

1965 – Did not enter
1966 – Did not enter
1968 – Semi-finals
1969 – Did not enter
1971 – Did not enter
1985 – Champion
1986 – Quarter-finals
1988 – Semi-finals
1990 – Second Round
2005 – Second Round
2006 – Second Round
2007 – Group stage (Top 8)
2008 – Preliminary Round
2009 – First Round
2014 – Preliminary Round
2024 – Second Round
2025 – Quarter-finals
2026 – Finalist

- CAF Confederation Cup: 7 appearances

2004 – Play-off round
2005 – Champion
2006 – Finalist
2010 – First Round
2013 – Play-off round
2022 – Second round
2023 – Quarter-finals

- CAF Cup Winners' Cup: 5 appearances

1987 – Quarter-finals
1997 – Finalist
1999 – Quarter-finals
2000 – Quarter-finals
2001 – Second Round

- CAF Super Cup: 1 appearances

2006 – Finalist

=== African cups all-time statistics ===
As of 21 April 2025

CAF competitions
Competition	S	P	W	D	L	GF	GA	GD
CAF Champions League	13	76	32	17	27	119	77	+42
CAF Confederation Cup	7	52	26	16	10	72	37	+35
African Cup Winners' Cup	5	32	16	6	10	45	27	+18
CAF Super Cup	1	1	0	1	0	0	0	0
Total	26	162	74	40	47	236	141	+95

== Players ==
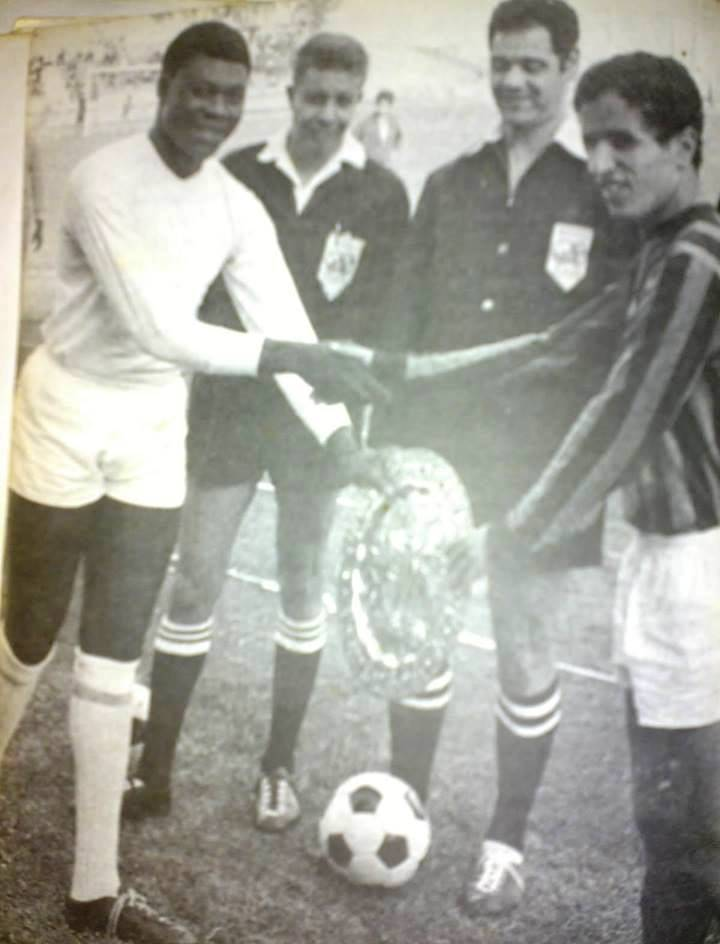
Pierre Kalala and Driss Bamous during the return of the 1968 African Champions Cup semi-final, against the AS FAR, in January 1969 TP Englebert in Casablanca

=== First team squad ===
As of 2 October 2026

Note: Flags indicate national team as defined under FIFA eligibility rules; some limited exceptions apply. Players may hold more than one non-FIFA nationality.

No.	Pos.	Nation	Player
1	GK	MAR	Ayoub El Khayati
2	DF	ANG	Tó Carneiro
3	MF	MAR	Anas Bach
4	DF	SEN	Fallou Mendy
6	MF	MAR	Zineddine Derrag
7	FW	MAR	Youssef El Fahli
8	MF	MAR	Khalid Aït Ouarkhane
9	FW	MAR	Mouhcine Bouriga
11	FW	MAR	Ahmed Hammoudan
13	MF	CGO	Merveil Ndockyt
15	DF	MAR	Marouane Louadni
16	GK	MAR	Ahmed Reda Tagnaouti
19	FW	MAR	Yazid Faffa

No.	Pos.	Nation	Player
21	FW	MAR	Marouane Oujeddou
22	GK	MAR	Hakim Mesbahi
23	DF	MAR	Jamal Ech-Chamakh
27	DF	MAR	Ayoub Ait Khassou
30	FW	COD	Jephte Kitambala
40	MF	MAR	Abdelfettah Hadraf
—	GK	MAR	Mohamed Jemjami
—	DF	MAR	Nadir Lougmani
—	DF	MAR	Nabil Marmouk
—	MF	MAR	Soulaimane El Bouchqali
—	MF	UGA	Allan Okello
—	FW	COD	Joël Beya
—	FW	MAR	Salaheddine Errahouli

== Managers ==
- (Morocco) Fin Mohamed Anouar (shtoki) (1958–59)
- (Morocco) Fin Larbi Benbarek (1959–60)
- (France) Guy Cluseau (1960–69)
- (Morocco) Mustafa El Ghazouani (1969–70)
- (Spain) Sabino Barinaga (1970–71)
- (Kingdom of Yugoslavia) Blagoje Vidinić (1971–72)
- (Brazil) Anoul dos Santos (1972–73)
- (Morocco) Amar Ben Siffedine (1972–73)
- (Spain) Sabino Barinaga (1973–74)
- (Morocco) Fin Driss Bamous (1973–74)
- (France) Guy Cluseau (1974–80)
- (Spain) Sabino Barinaga (1980–82)
- (Romania) Mircea Dridea (1982–83)
- (Brazil) (Morocco) Fin José Faria (1983–88)
- (Italy) (Argentina) Antonio Angelillo (1988–90)
- (Brazil) (Morocco) Fin José Faria (1990–92)
- (Morocco) Mustapha Dafarallah (1992–93)
- (Portugal) (Mozambique) Mário Wilson (1993–95)
- (Portugal) Jesualdo Ferreira (1995–96)
- (Portugal) Carlos Alhinho (1996–97)
- (Belgium) Henri Depireux (1997–98)
- (Belgium) Georges Heylens (1998–99)
- (Morocco) Rachid Taoussi (1999–2000)
- (Belgium) Henri Depireux (2000–2001)
- (France) Alain Giresse (July 1, 2001 – June 30, 2003)
- (Morocco) Mohamed Fakhir (2004–05)
- (France) Henri Stambouli (March 1, 2006 – Jan 6, 2007)
- (Morocco) Jaouad Milani (2007)
- (Morocco) Mustapha Madih (2007–2008)
- (Morocco) Mohamed Fakhir (2008–2009)
- (Belgium) Walter Meeuws (July 16, 2009 – Nov 7, 2009)
- (Morocco) Aziz El Amri (2010)
- (Morocco) Mustapha Madih (2010–2011)
- (Morocco) Fathi Jamal (Nov 1, 2011 – April 16, 2012)
- (Morocco) Rachid Taoussi (July 1, 2012 – Dec 7, 2012)
- (Morocco) Abderrazak Khairi (Dec 7, 2012 – June 25, 2013)
- (Morocco) Jaouad Milani (July 1, 2013 – Oct 1, 2013)
- (Morocco) Rachid Taoussi (Oct 22, 2013 – Dec 13, 2014)
- (Portugal) José Romão (2015–16)
- (Morocco) Abdelmalek El Aziz (2016)
- (Morocco) Aziz El Amri (2016–2018)
- (Morocco) Abderrazak Khairi (2018)
- (Morocco) Mohamed Fakhir (2018)
- (Spain) Carlos Alós Ferrer (2019)
- (Morocco) Abderrahim Taleb (2019–2020)
- (Belgium) Sven Vandenbroeck (2021–2022)
- (France) Fernando Da Cruz (2022–2023)
- (Morocco) Mohammed Aziz Samadi (2023)
- (Tunisia) Nasreddine Nabi (2023–2024)
- (Poland) Czesław Michniewicz (2024)
- (France) Hubert Velud (2024–25)
- (Portugal) Alexandre Santos (2025-2026)

== Supporters ==
ASFAR has the largest number of supporters of any team in Morocco. The greater focus of fans are in the region Rabat-Salé-Kénitra. It has a population of 4,580,866. Also, the club has an important fan base inside the country, where several towns are renowned for counting vast majorities of ASFAR supporters, and outside the borders, among Moroccan emigrants.

The ASFAR Ultras movement began in 2005, with Ultras Askary Rabat (UAR05) being the first Group Ultra in Morocco, and Black Army (BA06) being the second Group Ultra and it was created in 2006. Their sanctuary is the southern Included of the Prince Moulay Abdellah Stadium.

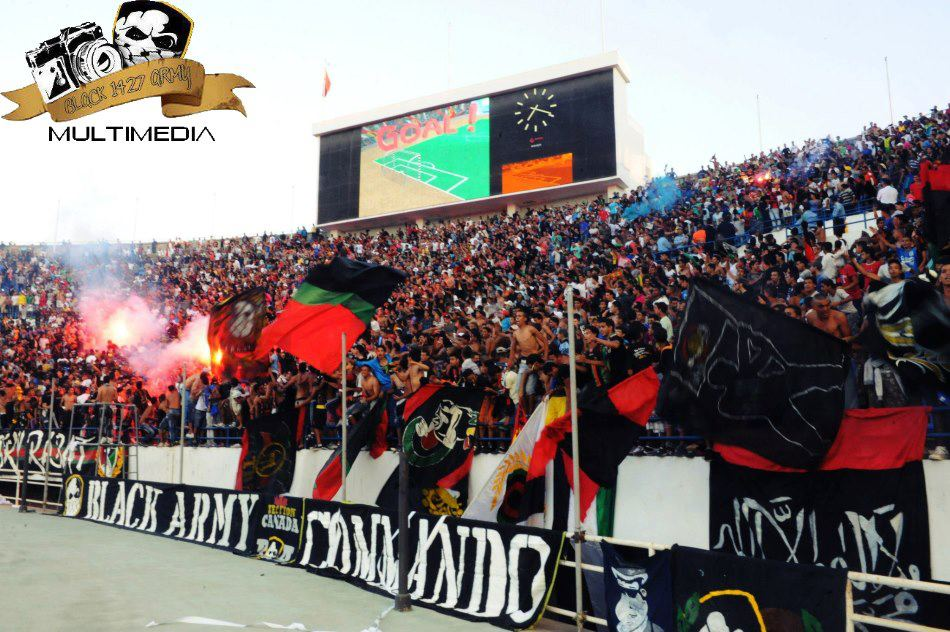
Curva chè

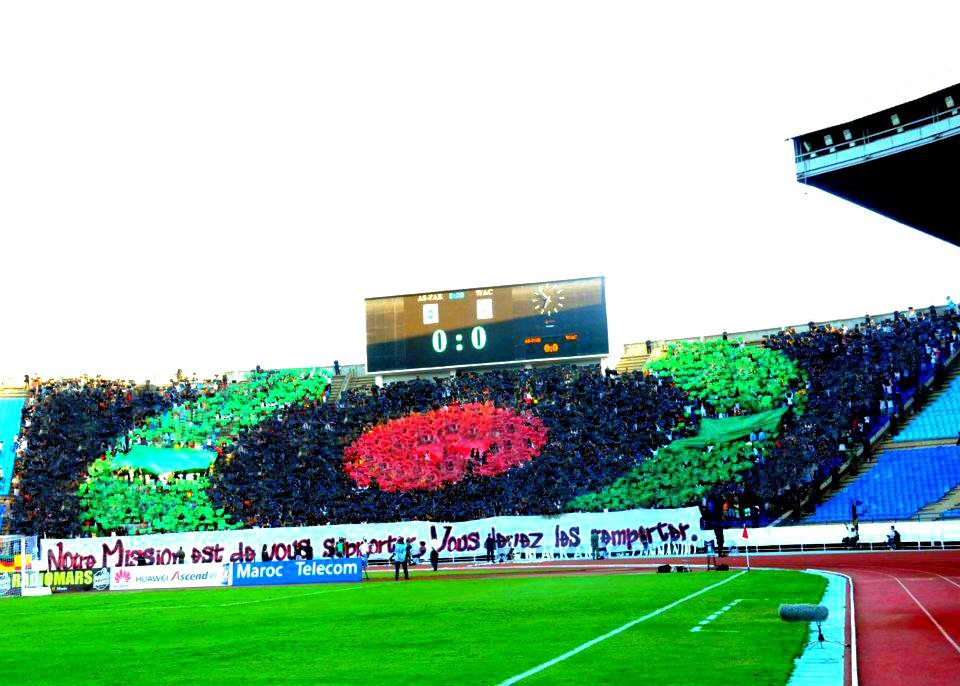
Tifo Ultras Black Army

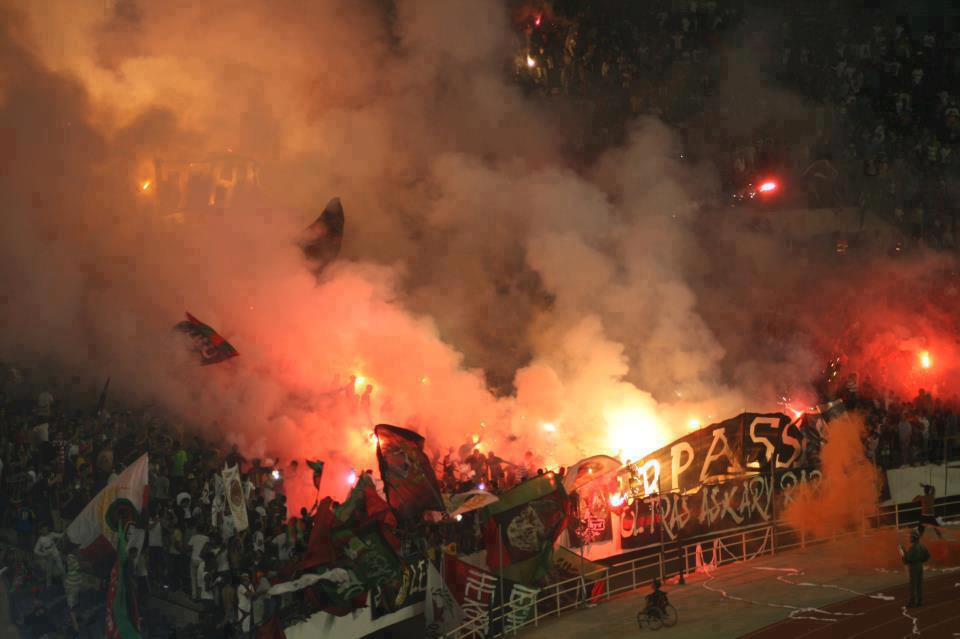
Pyroshow Ultras Askary

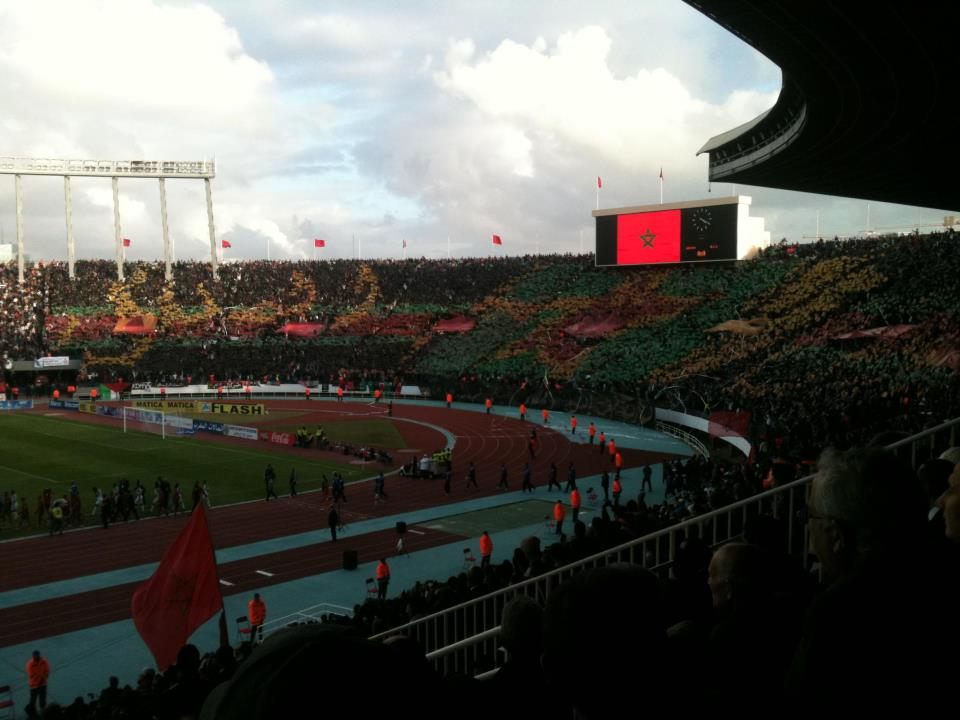
Tifo Ultras Askary before a final Coupe de Trône
