= 2015–16 IR Tanger season =

Tanger
2015–16 season
- President: Abdelhamid Abarchan
- Head Coach: Abdelhak Benchikha
- Stadium: Stade Ibn Batouta
- Botola: 3rd
- Coupe du Trône: Quarter-finals
- Top goalscorer: League: Hervé Guy (7); All: Abdessamad Rafik (9)
Home colours	Away colours	Third colours

The 2015–16 season is Ittihad Riadi Tanger's 33rd in existence and the club's 17th season in the top flight of Moroccan football. The club returned to the first (Botola Pro) division 2015–16 season after an absence of eight years.

== Kit ==
Supplier: Bang Sports / Main Sponsor: front: Moroccan Airports Authority / League Sponsor: front: Maroc Telecom

Home	Away	Third	Fourth

== Players ==
=== Squad ===
As of 6 March 2016

Note: Flags indicate national team as defined under FIFA eligibility rules; some limited exceptions apply. Players may hold more than one non-FIFA nationality.

No.	Pos.	Nation	Player
1	GK	MAR	Mohamed Bestara (captain)
2	DF	MAR	Zakaria Melhaoui
4	MF	MAR	Adil Merabet
5	DF	MAR	Jamal Ait Lamaalem
6	MF	MAR	Adnan Cherradi
9	FW	CMR	Brice Owona
10	FW	MAR	Badr Kachani
11	FW	MAR	Ahmed Hammoudan
12	GK	MAR	Younes Berrak
13	FW	MAR	Abdelaali El Abboubi
14	MF	CMR	Alexis Enam
16	MF	MAR	Ahmed Chentouf *
17	FW	MAR	Abdelghani Mouaoui

No.	Pos.	Nation	Player
21	MF	MAR	Abdessamad Rafik
25	DF	BIH	Enes Šipović
27	MF	MAR	Abdessamad Imaich
29	DF	MAR	Oussama El Ghrib (vice-captain)
30	MF	MAR	Bakr El Helali
31	DF	MAR	Ayoub El Khaliqi
32	DF	MAR	Mustapha Khalfi
33	DF	MAR	Abdelfettah Boukhriss (on loan from FUS Rabat)
71	MF	CIV	Hervé Guy
84	GK	MAR	Ahmed Mohamadina
90	GK	MAR	Marouane Fakhr
98	MF	MAR	Youssef Sekour

==== Out during the season ====
Note: Flags indicate national team as defined under FIFA eligibility rules; some limited exceptions apply. Players may hold more than one non-FIFA nationality.

No.	Pos.	Nation	Player
7	FW	MAR	Faouzi Abdelghani
8	MF	MAR	Kahlid Serroukh
18	MF	MAR	Badreddine Naciri

No.	Pos.	Nation	Player
19	MF	CRO	Zoran Plazonić
55	DF	MAR	Ahmed Rahmani

==== From youth squad ====
Note: Flags indicate national team as defined under FIFA eligibility rules; some limited exceptions apply. Players may hold more than one non-FIFA nationality.

No.	Pos.	Nation	Player
—	MF	MAR	Abdelghafour Jebroun *
—	MF	MAR	Abdelali Assri *

No.	Pos.	Nation	Player
—	MF	MAR	Bilal Guennouni *

=== Transfers ===
==== In (summer) ====
Note: Flags indicate national team as defined under FIFA eligibility rules; some limited exceptions apply. Players may hold more than one non-FIFA nationality.

No.	Pos.	Nation	Player
—	DF	CMR	Cédric Djeugoué (from (Cameroon) Coton Sport FC de Garoua) irt.ma
9	FW	CMR	Brice Owona (from (Cameroon) New Star de Douala) irt.ma
29	DF	MAR	Oussama El Ghrib (from Difaâ El Jadidi) irt.ma
55	DF	MAR	Ahmed Rahmani (from MAS Fez) irt.ma
13	FW	MAR	Abdelaali El Abboubi (from Chabab Atlas Khénifra) irt.ma
21	MF	MAR	Abdessamad Rafik (from Moghreb Tétouan) irt.ma
90	GK	MAR	Marouane Fakhr (from US Témara) kooora.com
5	DF	MAR	Jamal Ait Lamaalem (from Union Aït Melloul) irt.ma
7	FW	MAR	Faouzi Abdelghani (from Moghreb Tétouan) irt.ma
10	FW	MAR	Badr Kachani (from KAC Kénitra) irt.ma
19	MF	CRO	Zoran Plazonić (from (Bosnia and Herzegovina) NK Široki Brijeg) irt.ma
17	FW	MAR	Abdelghani Mouaoui (from Olympic Safi) irt.ma
25	DF	BIH	Enes Šipović (from (Belgium) K.V.C. Westerlo) irt.ma
30	MF	MAR	Bakr El Helali (from Difaâ El Jadidi) kooora.com
14	MF	CMR	Alexis Enam (from (Saudi Arabia) Al-Raed) irt.ma
33	DF	MAR	Abdelfettah Boukhriss (on loan from FUS Rabat) irt.ma

==== Out (summer) ====
Note: Flags indicate national team as defined under FIFA eligibility rules; some limited exceptions apply. Players may hold more than one non-FIFA nationality.

No.	Pos.	Nation	Player
—	MF	MAR	Badr Zaki Nacer (to Union Aït Melloul)
—	DF	MAR	Karim Ait Darham (to Union Aït Melloul)
—	DF	MAR	Mourad Hibour (to Youssoufia Berrechid)
—	MF	GUI	Aboubacar Kourouma (to AS Salé)
—	MF	SEN	Sacko Cheickn (contract termination) irt.ma
—	DF	CMR	Cédric Djeugoué (contract termination) kooora.com
—	FW	MAR	Rachid Ait Hammou (to AS Salé) assabah.ma
—	FW	MAR	Ibrahim Ouchrif (to COD Meknès) kooora.com

==== In (winter) ====
Note: Flags indicate national team as defined under FIFA eligibility rules; some limited exceptions apply. Players may hold more than one non-FIFA nationality.

No.	Pos.	Nation	Player
31	DF	MAR	Ayoub El Khaliqi (from FAR Rabat) irtfoot.ma
98	MF	MAR	Youssef Sekour (from Fath Union Sport) le360.ma
84	GK	MAR	Ahmed Mohamadina (from Difaâ El Jadidi) le360.ma

==== Out (winter) ====
Note: Flags indicate national team as defined under FIFA eligibility rules; some limited exceptions apply. Players may hold more than one non-FIFA nationality.

No.	Pos.	Nation	Player
8	MF	MAR	Kahlid Serroukh (to Raja Beni Mellal) kooora.com
55	DF	MAR	Ahmed Rahmani (to MC Oujda) kooora.com
19	MF	CRO	Zoran Plazonić (to (Croatia) HNK Šibenik) hnk-sibenik.hr
18	MF	MAR	Badreddine Naciri (to Ittihad Khemisset) bayanealyaoume
7	FW	MAR	Faouzi Abdelghani (to OC Khouribga) kooora.com

=== Technical staff ===
Position	Name
First team head coach	(Algeria) Abdelhak Benchikha
1st assistant coach	(Morocco) Abderrazak Belarabi
2nd assistant coach	(Morocco) Mohamed Sabek "Simou"
Goalkeeping coach	(Morocco) Mohamed Jbari
Fitness coach	(Morocco) Abdelhakim Mouchriq
B team coach	(Morocco) Jaafar R'kyek

=== Goal scorers ===
No.	Pos.	Nation	Name	Botola	Coupe du Trône	Total
21	MF	(Morocco)	Abdessamad Rafik	6	3	9
71	MF	(Ivory Coast)	Hervé Guy	7	1	8
17	FW	(Morocco)	Abdelghani Mouaoui	6	2	8
10	FW	(Morocco)	Badr Kachani	5	1	6
98	MF	(Morocco)	Youssef Sekour	3	0	3
30	MF	(Morocco)	Bakr El Helali	1	2	3
11	FW	(Morocco)	Ahmed Hammoudan	2	0	2
33	DF	(Morocco)	Abdelfettah Boukhriss	1	1	2
~~7~~	FW	(Morocco)	Faouzi Abdelghani	0	2	2
4	MF	(Morocco)	Adil Merabet	1	0	1
9	FW	(Cameroon)	Brice Owona	1	0	1
13	FW	(Morocco)	Abdelaali El Abboubi	1	0	1
25	DF	(Bosnia and Herzegovina)	Enes Šipović	1	0	1
14	MF	(Cameroon)	Alexis Enam	0	1	1
#	Own goals			1	0	1
TOTAL				36	13	49

=== Assists ===
No.	Pos.	Nation	Name	Botola	Coupe du Trône	Total
17	FW	(Morocco)	Abdelghani Mouaoui	8	0	8
11	FW	(Morocco)	Ahmed Hammoudan	4	1	5
21	MF	(Morocco)	Abdessamad Rafik	1	3	4
13	MF	(Morocco)	Abdelaali El Abboubi	2	1	3
10	FW	(Morocco)	Badr Kachani	2	0	2
29	DF	(Morocco)	Oussama El Ghrib	2	0	2
30	MF	(Morocco)	Bakr El Helali	1	1	2
14	MF	(Cameroon)	Alexis Enam	1	1	2
27	MF	(Morocco)	Abdessamad Imaich	1	1	2
9	FW	(Cameroon)	Brice Owona	1	0	1
71	MF	(Ivory Coast)	Hervé Guy	0	1	1
TOTAL				23	8	31

=== Clean sheets ===
As of 19 June 2016.

Rank	Name	Botola	Coupe du Trône	Total	Played Games
1	(Morocco) Mohamed Bestara	1	2	3	9
12	(Morocco) Younes Berrak	0	0	0	0
84	(Morocco) Ahmed Mohamadina	7	1	8	13
90	(Morocco) Marouane Fakhr	5	0	5	16
Total		13	3	16	38

=== Disciplinary record ===
N	P	Nat.	Name	Botola			Coupe du Trône			Total			Notes
N	P	Nat.	Name	Yellow card	Second yellow card	Red card	Yellow card	Second yellow card	Red card	Yellow card	Second yellow card	Red card	Notes
1	GK	(Morocco)	Mohamed Bestara	1			1			2			
2	DF	(Morocco)	Zakaria Melhaoui	3						3			
4	MF	(Morocco)	Adil Merabet	3						3			
5	DF	(Morocco)	Jamal Ait Lamaalem	2						2			
9	FW	(Cameroon)	Brice Owona	(1)						1			
10	FW	(Morocco)	Badr Kachani	4						4			
11	FW	(Morocco)	Ahmed Hammoudan	1			1			2			
13	MF	(Morocco)	Abdelaali El Abboubi	1						1			
14	MF	(Cameroon)	Alexis Enam	6			1			7			
17	FW	(Morocco)	Abdelghani Mouaoui	3		1				3		1	
21	MF	(Morocco)	Abdessamad Rafik	5						5			
25	DF	(Bosnia and Herzegovina)	Enes Šipović	8	1					8	1		
27	MF	(Morocco)	Abdessamad Imaich	3						3			
29	DF	(Morocco)	Oussama El Ghrib	3			1			4			
30	MF	(Morocco)	Bakr El Helali	3			2			5			
31	DF	(Morocco)	Ayoub El Khaliqi	2						2			
32	DF	(Morocco)	Mustapha Khalfi	1						1			
33	DF	(Morocco)	Abdelfettah Boukhriss	5			1			6			
71	MF	(Ivory Coast)	Hervé Guy	1			1			2			
98	MF	(Morocco)	Youssef Sekour	3						3			
~~7~~	FW	(Morocco)	Faouzi Abdelghani	1						1			
~~19~~	MF	(Croatia)	Zoran Plazonić	3						3			

Last updated: 19 June 2016
Source: mountakhab.net goalzz.com
Only competitive matches
(yellow card) = Number of bookings; (second yellow card) = Number of sending offs after a second yellow card; (red card) = Number of sending offs by a direct red card.

=== Squad statistics ===
As of 19 June 2016.

No.	Pos	Nat	Player	Total		Botola		Coupe du Trône	
No.	Pos	Nat	Player	Apps	Goals	Apps	Goals	Apps	Goals
1	GK	(Morocco) MAR	Mohamed Bestara	9	-8	3	(−3)	6	(−5)
2	DF	(Morocco) MAR	Zakaria Melhaoui	32	0	24	0	8	0
4	MF	(Morocco) MAR	Adil Merabet	27	1	21	1	6	0
5	DF	(Morocco) MAR	Jamal Ait Lamaalem	13	0	11	0	2	0
6	MF	(Morocco) MAR	Adnane Cherradi	5	0	5	0	0	0
9	FW	(Cameroon) CMR	Brice Owona	12	1	12	1	0	0
10	FW	(Morocco) MAR	Badr Kachani	28	6	25	5	3	1
11	FW	(Morocco) MAR	Ahmed Hammoudan	33	2	27	2	6	0
12	GK	(Morocco) MAR	Younes Berrak	0	0	0	(0)	0	(0)
13	FW	(Morocco) MAR	Abdelaali El Abboubi	32	1	25	1	7	0
14	MF	(Cameroon) CMR	Alexis Enam	34	1	26	0	8	1
16	MF	(Morocco) MAR	Ahmed Chentouf	0	0	0	0	0	0
17	FW	(Morocco) MAR	Abdelghani Mouaoui	33	8	26	6	7	2
21	MF	(Morocco) MAR	Abdessamad Rafik	29	9	22	6	7	3
25	DF	(Bosnia and Herzegovina) BIH	Enes Šipović	32	1	24	1	8	0
27	MF	(Morocco) MAR	Abdessamad Imaich	19	0	13	0	6	0
29	DF	(Morocco) MAR	Oussama El Ghrib	33	0	25	0	8	0
30	MF	(Morocco) MAR	Bakr El Helali	32	3	24	1	8	2
31	DF	(Morocco) MAR	Ayoub El Khaliqi	13	0	12	0	1	0
32	DF	(Morocco) MAR	Mustapha Khalfi	7	0	7	0	0	0
33	DF	(Morocco) MAR	Abdelfettah Boukhriss	23	2	21	1	2	1
71	MF	(Ivory Coast) CIV	Hervé Guy	17	8	15	7	2	1
84	GK	(Morocco) MAR	Ahmed Mohamadina	13	-8	11	(−6)	2	(−2)
90	GK	(Morocco) MAR	Marouane Fakhr	16	-14	16	(−14)	0	(0)
98	MF	(Morocco) MAR	Youssef Sekour	14	3	12	3	2	0
~~7~~	FW	(Morocco) MAR	Faouzi Abdelghani #	9	2	4	0	5	2
~~8~~	MF	(Morocco) MAR	Kahlid Serroukh #	0	0	0	0	0	0
~~18~~	MF	(Morocco) MAR	Badreddine Naciri #	0	0	0	0	0	0
~~19~~	MF	(Croatia) CRO	Zoran Plazonić #	12	0	6	0	6	0
~~55~~	DF	(Morocco) MAR	Ahmed Rahmani #	3	0	1	0	2	0

^{#} Player left the club during the season

== Pre-season and friendlies ==
Win Draw Loss

11 July 2015 1	IR Tanger (Morocco)	1–1	(Morocco) Kénitra AC	Tangier, Morocco
23:00 UTC	Owona 10'		El Mnasfi 65' (pen.)	Stadium: Stade Ibn Batouta; Attendance: 0

21 July 2015 2	IR Tanger (Morocco)	2–2	(Morocco) Maghreb AS	Tangier, Morocco
17:00 UTC	Rafik; Kachani		Dahmani; Sidibe (red card)	Stadium: Stade Ibn Batouta

25 July 2015 3	AS FAR (Morocco)	1–0	(Morocco) IR Tanger	Khemisset, Morocco
16:00 UTC	Khabba			Stadium: Stade du 18 novembre

28 July 2015 4	Fath US (Morocco)	0–0	(Morocco) IR Tanger	Rabat, Morocco
19:00 UTC				Stadium: Stade Prince Moulay Al Hassan

4 August 2015 5	IR Tanger (Morocco)	2–1	(Spain) Granada CF	Tangier, Morocco
19:30 UTC	Plazonić 8'; Kachani 23'		El-Arabi 43'	Stadium: Stade Ibn Batouta; Attendance: 25,000; Referee: Khalid Ennouni

7 August 2015 6	Loja CD (Spain)	1–1	(Morocco) IR Tanger	Loja, Spain
18:00 UTC	Pineda 21'		El Ghrib 8'	Stadium: Medina Lauxa

11 August 2015 7	Marbella FC (Spain)	1–0	(Morocco) IR Tanger	Estepona, Spain
16:45 UTC	Gabi 25'			Stadium: Complejo Arroyo Enmedio

14 August 2015 8	UD Los Barrios (Spain)	0–5	(Morocco) IR Tanger	Estepona, Spain
17:00 UTC			Rafik 11', 89' (pen.); El Abboubi 30'; Merabet 73' (pen.); Kachani 80'	Stadium: Complejo Arroyo Enmedio

22 October 2015 9	IR Tanger (Morocco)	4–1	(Morocco) C Rajae Boughaz F	Tangier, Morocco
10:00 UTC	Kachani 6'; Rafik 12', 40'; Owona 41'		Goal	Stadium: Stade de Marchan

23 October 2015 10	IR Tanger (Morocco)	7–1	(Morocco) C Ben Diban	Tangier, Morocco
10:00 UTC	Rafik 5', 75'; Owona 20'; Merabet 53'; Kachani 61'; Hammoudan 78'; El Abboubi 88'		Goal	Stadium: Stade de Marchan

3 November 2015 11	C Asilah (Morocco)	1–3	(Morocco) IR Tanger	Asilah, Morocco
14:00 UTC	Goal		El Abboubi 8'; El Ghiati 63'; Oueld El Hamra 77'	Stadium: Stade Municipal d'Asilah; Attendance: 1,000

20 January 2016 12	CRS Jadida (Morocco)	0–1	(Morocco) IR Tanger	El Jadida, Morocco
15:00 UTC			Imaich 25'	Stadium: complex of Mazagan

25 January 2016 13	R Moulay Abdella (Morocco)	0–6	(Morocco) IR Tanger	El Jadida, Morocco
15:00 UTC			Sekour 7'; Imaich 15', 59', 80'; Rafik 36'; Owona 49'	Stadium: complex of Mazagan

3 February 2016 14	IR Tanger (Morocco)	6–0	(Morocco) C Raja Boughaz F	Tangier, Morocco
15:00 UTC	Kachani 7' (pen.), 39'; Rafik 47'; Mouaoui 70'; Owona 74', 86'		Goal	Stadium: Stade Centre Ziaten

7 February 2016 15	IR Tanger (Morocco)	1–1	(Morocco) Raja CA	Tangier, Morocco
15:00 UTC	Mouaoui 28'		Issah 66'	Stadium: Stade Ibn Batouta

14 May 2016 16	IR Tanger (Morocco)	6–0	(Morocco) C Ben Diban	Asilah, Morocco
10:30 UTC+1	Sekour 36' (pen.); Rafik 51', 59'; El Ghrib 55'; Mouaoui 58'; Owona 65'			Stadium: Stade Municipal d'Asilah

== Competitions ==
=== Overview ===
Competition	Record							
Competition	Pld	W	D	L	GF	GA	GD	Win %
2015–16 Botola	30	14	8	8	36	23	+13	46.67
2015 Coupe du Trône	6	3	2	1	9	5	+4	50.00
2016 Coupe du Trône	2	1	0	1	4	2	+2	50.00
Total	38	18	10	10	49	30	+19	47.37

Last updated: 19 June 2016
Source: Competitions

=== Botola ===
==== League table ====
Pos	Team	Pld	W	D	L	GF	GA	GD	Pts	Qualification or relegation
1	FUS Rabat (C)	30	16	10	4	40	21	+19	58	CAF Champions League and the Arab Club Championship
2	Wydad Casablanca	30	16	8	6	34	19	+15	56	Qualification to the CAF Champions League
3	IR Tanger	30	14	8	8	36	23	+13	50	Qualification to the CAF Confederation Cup
4	FAR Rabat	30	13	8	9	40	35	+5	47	
5	Raja Casablanca	30	13	8	9	48	30	+18	47	

Updated to match(es) played on 4 June 2016. Source:
Rules for classification: 1) points; 2) goal difference; 3) number of goals scored.
(C) Champions

==== Results summary ====
Overall								Home						Away					
Pld	W	D	L	GF	GA	GD	Pts	W	D	L	GF	GA	GD	W	D	L	GF	GA	GD
30	14	8	8	36	23	+13	50	10	2	3	22	8	+14	4	6	5	14	15	−1

Last updated: 4 June 2016.
Source: Competitive matches

==== Results by round ====
Round	1	2	3	4	5	6	7	8	9	10	11	12	13	14	15	16	17	18	19	20	21	22	23	24	25	26	27	28	29	30
Ground	H	A	H	A	H	A	H	A	H	A	A	H	A	H	A	A	H	A	H	A	H	A	H	A	H	H	A	H	A	H
Result	W	L	D	W	W	D	W	D	L	W	D	L	W	W	D	D	L	L	W	L	W	D	W	L	W	W	L	D	W	W
Position	3	7	6	5	3	4	2	3	3	3	3	3	3	3	3	3	3	5	3	4	5	4	4	5	4	3	4	4	4	3

Updated to match(es) played on 4 June 2016. Source: Competitive matches
A = Away; H = Home; W = Win; D = Draw; L = Loss

==== Matches ====
Win Draw Loss

5 September 2015 1	IR Tanger	2–0	Maghreb AS	Tangier
19:30 UTC	Rafik 10'; El Ghrib (yellow card) 37'; Melhaoui (yellow card) 44'; Plazonić (yellow card) 49'; Imaich (yellow card) 53'; Šipović (yellow card) 72'; Mouaoui 87' (yellow card) 88'	Report	Kone (yellow card) 37'; El Baraka (yellow card) 40'; Bencherki (penalty missed) 73'	Stadium: Stade Ibn Batouta; Referee: Hicham Tiyazi

12 September 2015 2	CR Al-Hoceima	1–0	IR Tanger	Al Hoceima
16:00 UTC	Ndiaye (yellow card) 61'; El Moubarki 76'	Report		Stadium: Stade Mimoun Al Arsi; Referee: Samir Guezzaz

3 October 2015 3	IR Tanger	2–2	MA Tétouan	Tangier
15:00 UTC	Rafik (yellow card) 16' (goal) 28' (pen.); Plazonić (yellow card) 20'; Boukhriss 42'; El Ghrib (yellow card) 48'; Bestara (yellow card) 59'	Report	Ouald El Haj (yellow card) 23'; Abarhoun (yellow card) 27'; El Maimouni 58' (yellow card) 71'; Krouch 64' (yellow card) 64'	Stadium: Stade Ibn Batouta; Attendance: 40.000; Referee: Bouchaib El Ahrach

11 October 2015 4	AS FAR	1–2	IR Tanger	Rabat
13:30 UTC	Benarif 37'; Cheikhi (yellow card) 44'; El Yousfi (yellow card) 47'	Report	Kachani 8', 47'	Stadium: Stade de FUS; Referee: Karim Sabri

30 October 2015 5	IR Tanger	2–1	OC Khouribga	Tangier
19:00 UTC	Kachani 36' (yellow card); Rafik 90'; Abdelghani (yellow card); Plazonić (yellow card)	Report	Bennay (yellow card) 14'; Bakayoko (yellow card) 65'; Sidibé 82'; Yamik (yellow card) 90+1'; Diomande (red card) 90+3'	Stadium: Stade de Marchan; Attendance: 0 (punishment); Referee: Abdelah Jaafari

7 November 2015 6	DH Jadida	1–1	IR Tanger	El Jadida
15:00 UTC	Ouattara 18' (yellow card) 34'; Azarou (yellow card) 19'; Diakate (red card) 64'; Hadhoudi (yellow card) 84'	Report	Mouaoui 9'; Šipović (yellow card) 34'; Rafik (yellow card) 67'; El Ghrib (yellow card)	Stadium: Stade El Abdi; Referee: Mohamed Belloute

13 November 2015 7	IR Tanger	1–0	RS Berkane	Tangier
16:00 UTC	{Owona (yellow card) 41'} Šipović (yellow card) 57'; Rafik 78' (pen.); El Helali (yellow card) 89'; Merabet (yellow card) 90+4'; Fakhr (yellow card)	Report	El Kass (yellow card) 24'; Laachir (yellow card) 48'	Stadium: Stade de Marchan; Attendance: 0 (punishment); Referee: Youssef Harraoui

21 November 2015 8	Wydad AC	2–2	IR Tanger	Casablanca
19:30 UTC	Housni 23'; Fall 27'; Noussir (yellow card) 76'; Nekkach (yellow card) 84'	Report	Rafik 7'; Merabet (yellow card) 34'; Šipović (yellow card) 38'; Alexis (yellow card) 62'; El Helali (yellow card) 89'; Owona 90+1'	Stadium: Stade Mohamed V Attendance: 65.000; Referee: Adil Zourak

28 November 2015 9	IR Tanger	0–1	OC Safi	Tangier
16:30 UTC	Melhaoui (yellow card) 14'; Rafik (yellow card) 59' (penalty missed) 76'; Alexis (yellow card) 65'	Report	Chedli 50'; Lamti (yellow card) 67'; Madani (yellow card) 77'; Hamoudi (yellow card) 79'; Semoumi (yellow card) 90+2'; El Bahraoui (yellow card) 90+2'	Stadium: Stade de Marchan; Attendance: 0 (punishment); Referee: Hicham Tiyazi

4 December 2015 10	HUS Agadir	1–3	IR Tanger	Agadir
15:00 UTC	El Gourch 32' (yellow card) 59'; Khaddou (yellow card) 67'; El Berkaoui (yellow card) 88'; El Mejhad (yellow card) 90+9'	Report	Rafik 69' (pen.); Kachani 79'; Merabet 90+10' (pen.)	Stadium: Stade Adrar; Referee: Noureddine Brahim

13 December 2015 11	Kénitra AC	0–0	IR Tanger	Salé
15:00 UTC	(yellow card) 52'; Chibi (yellow card) 76'; Chihani (yellow card) 89'	Report		Stadium: Stade Boubker Ammar; Referee: Noureddine Jaafari

20 December 2015 12	IR Tanger	0–1	Fath US	Tangier
18:00 UTC	Šipović (yellow card) 27'; Merabet (yellow card) 52'; Rafik (yellow card) 64'	Report	Sy (yellow card) 48'; Khalis (yellow card) 55'; Batna 58'; Jarici (yellow card) 82'; Saâdane (yellow card) 86'	Stadium: Stade Ibn Batouta; Referee: Redouane Jiyed

25 December 2015 13	KAC Marrakech	0–1	IR Tanger	Marrakesh
18:00 UTC	Kiki (yellow card) 53'; Veiga (yellow card) 89'	Report	El Abboubi 61'	Stadium: Stade de Marrakech; Referee: Karim Sabri

1 January 2016 14	IR Tanger	3–0	MC Oujda	Tangier
15:00 UTC	Melhaoui (yellow card) 40'; Kachani 41' (yellow card) 79'; Hammoudan 47'; Hervé 76'; Boukhriss (yellow card) 90+3'	Report	Tiam (yellow card) 44'; Tajeddine (yellow card) 69'	Stadium: Stade Ibn Batouta; Referee: Bouchaib El Ahrach

7 January 2016 15	Raja CA	2–2	IR Tanger	Casablanca
19:00 UTC	Jahouh 46' (pen.); Mabidi 77'	Report	Šipović 16' (yellow card) 74'; Hammoudan 35'; Alexis (yellow card) 40'; Kachani (yellow card) 49'	Stadium: Stade Mohamed V Attendance: 60.000; Referee: Daki Radad

13 February 2016 16	Maghreb AS	0–0	IR Tanger	Fez
15:00 UTC	Lamni (yellow card) 41'; Krarchi (yellow card) 45'; Bencherki (yellow card) 60'	Report	Alexis (yellow card) 13'; Sekour (yellow card) 60'; Imaich (yellow card) 80'; Rafik (yellow card) 90'; Boukhriss (yellow card) 90+4'	Stadium: Fez Stadium; Referee: Hicham Tiyazi

21 February 2016 17	IR Tanger	0–2	CR Al-Hoceima	Tangier
14:30 UTC	Hervé (yellow card) 4'; Šipović (yellow card) 19' (yellow-red card) 41'	Report	Traoré (yellow card) 33'; Kemajou 50' (yellow card) 77'; Bamoussa 83'; Ramch (yellow card) 86'; Bouamira (yellow card) 88'	Stadium: Stade Ibn Batouta; Referee: Noureddine Brahim

28 February 2016 18	MA Tétouan	1–0	IR Tanger	Tétouan
14:30 UTC	Bellakhder (yellow card) 56'; Naïm (yellow card) 72'; Hawassi 89' (yellow card) 90'; El Assimi (yellow card) 90+7'	Report		Stadium: Stade Saniat Rmel; Referee: Redouane Jiyed

6 March 2016 19	IR Tanger	1–0	AS FAR	Tangier
18:00 UTC	Sekour (yellow card) 37' (goal) 68'; El Abboubi (yellow card) 61'; Kachani (yellow card) 73'; Alexis (yellow card) 83'	Report	Naghmi (yellow card) 56'; Fettah (yellow card) 65'; Haddad (yellow card) 68'	Stadium: Stade Ibn Batouta; Attendance: 38.000; Referee: Daki Radad

19 March 2016 21	IR Tanger	1–0	DH Jadida	Tangier
14:30 UTC	Mustapha Khalfi (yellow card) 34'; Mouaoui 63'; Hammoudan (yellow card) 75'	Report	Jayed (yellow card) 90+2'	Stadium: Stade Ibn Batouta; Attendance: 25.000; Referee: Bouchaib El Ahrach

24 March 2016 20	OC Khouribga	1–0	IR Tanger	Khouribga
16:00 UTC	Bennay 44' (pen.) (yellow card) 55'; Fané (yellow card) 46'; Mezkouri (yellow card) 90'; Mouâtamid (yellow card) 90+2'	Report	El Helali (yellow card) 57'; El Khaliqi (yellow card) 87'	Stadium: Complexe OCP; Referee: Hicham Tiyazi

2 April 2016 22	RS Berkane	0–0	IR Tanger	Berkane
17:00 UTC+1		Report	Sekour (yellow card) 44'; El Khaliqi (yellow card) 70'	Stadium: Stade Municipal (Berkane); Referee: Noureddine Jaafari

13 April 2016 23	IR Tanger	3–0	Wydad AC	Tangier
17:00 UTC+1	Karnass 6' (o.g.); Hervé 36'; Šipović (yellow card) 46'; Mouaoui 47' (yellow card) 48'	Report	Kieta (yellow card) 35'; Fall (yellow card) 63'	Stadium: Stade Ibn Batouta; Attendance: 38.000; Referee: Adil Zourak

17 April 2016 24	OC Safi	2–0	IR Tanger	Safi
17:15 UTC+1	Madi 9'; Namli 73'	Report	Šipović (yellow card) 80'	Stadium: Stade El Massira; Referee: Karim Sabri

24 April 2016 25	IR Tanger	3–1	HUS Agadir	Tangier
16:00 UTC+1	Sekour 21', 63'; Mouaoui 69' (red card) 90+1'; Boukhriss (yellow card) 87'; Ait Lamaalem (yellow card) 90+5'	Report	Koné (yellow card) 20'; Aouk (yellow card) 20'; Lirki 25' (pen.) (yellow card) 64'; Karine (yellow card) 34'; Soufiane (yellow card) 42'; Daoudi (yellow card) 52'; Zaidi (yellow card) 60'	Stadium: Stade Ibn Batouta; Referee: Daki Radad

30 April 2016 26	IR Tanger	1–0	Kénitra AC	Tangier
19:00 UTC+1	Hervé 57'; Imaich (yellow card) 65'; Boukhriss (yellow card) 90+1'	Report		Stadium: Stade Ibn Batouta; Attendance: 37.000; Referee: Mohamed Allam

22 May 2016 28	IR Tanger	0–0	KAC Marrakech	Tangier
17:00 UTC+1	Ait Lamaalem (yellow card) 6'	Report	Sekkat (yellow card) 43'; Amimi (yellow card) 75'; Elmansouri (yellow card) 86'	Stadium: Stade Ibn Batouta; Referee: Bouchaib El Ahrach

25 May 2016 27	Fath US	2–1	IR Tanger	Rabat
15:30 UTC+1	Mandaw 71'; Aguerd 90+3'	Report	Boukhriss (yellow card) 52'; Hervé 90'	Stadium: Stade Moulay Hassan; Attendance: 7.000; Referee: Abderrahim Yagoubi

29 May 2016 29	MC Oujda	1–2	IR Tanger	Oujda
17:00 UTC+1	Belamkadem 27'	Report	Hervé 37'; Mouaoui 90'	Stadium: Honneur Stadium; Referee: Bouchaib El Ahrach

4 June 2016 30	IR Tanger	3–0	Raja CA	Tangier
17:00 UTC+1	Mouaoui (yellow card) 22'; El Helali 45'; Hervé 64', 90'; Alexis (yellow card) 72'	Report		Stadium: Stade Ibn Batouta; Attendance: 40.000; Referee: Abderrahim Yagoubi

==== Results overview ====
Locations of the 2015–16 Botola teams

Win Draw Loss

Region	Team	Home score	Away score	Aggregate
Rabat-Salé-Kénitra	FAR Rabat	1–0	1–2	3–1
Rabat-Salé-Kénitra	Fath Union Sport	0–1	1–0	0–2
Rabat-Salé-Kénitra	KAC Kénitra	1–0	0–0	1–0
Casablanca-Settat	Difaâ El Jadidi	1–0	1–1	2–1
Casablanca-Settat	Raja Casablanca	3–0	2–2	5–2
Casablanca-Settat	Wydad Casablanca	3–0	2–2	5–2
Tanger-Tetouan-Al Hoceima	Chabab Rif Al Hoceima	0–2	1–0	0–3
Tanger-Tetouan-Al Hoceima	Moghreb Tétouan	2–2	1–0	2–3
Oriental	MC Oujda	3–0	1–2	5–1
Oriental	RSB Berkane	1–0	0–0	1–0
Marrakesh-Safi	KAC Marrakech	0–0	0–1	1–0
Marrakesh-Safi	Olympic Safi	0–1	2–0	0–3
Fez-Meknes	MAS Fez	2–0	0–0	2–0
Béni Mellal-Khénifra	Olympique Khouribga	2–1	1–0	2–2
Souss-Massa	Hassania Agadir	3–1	1–3	6–2

=== Coupe du Trône ===
==== 2015 ====
Win Draw Loss

===== Round of 32 =====
22 August 2015 First leg	IR Tanger	3–1	COD Meknès	Tangier
18:30 UTC	Abdelghani 4'; El Helali 52'; Rafik 77' (pen.)		Abdelouahab 38'	Stadium: Stade Ibn Batouta; Attendance: 0 (punishment); Referee: Daki Radad

28 August 2015 Second leg	COD Meknès	0–2 (1–5 agg.)	IR Tanger	Meknes
16:00 UTC			Alexis 27'; Mouaoui 82'	Stadium: Stade d'Honneur

===== Round of 16 =====
31 August 2015 First leg	IR Tanger	1–0	CAY Berrechid	Tangier
16:00 UTC	Kachani 86'			Stadium: Stade Ibn Batouta; Attendance: 0 (punishment)

8 September 2015 Second leg	CAY Berrechid	1–1 (1–2 agg.)	IR Tanger	Berrechid
16:00 UTC	Almosawi 55' (pen.)		Rafik 31'	Stadium: Stade Municipal de Berrechid; Referee: Hassan Rahmani

===== Quarter-finals =====
18 September 2015 First leg	OC Khouribga	1–1	IR Tanger	Kaasba Tadla
14:00 UTC	Diomande (yellow card) 12'; Largou (yellow card) 41'; Bakayoko (yellow card) 57'; Tlati (yellow card) 60'; Lahrari 81'		Abdelghani 89'; Bestara (yellow card) 90'	Stadium: Complexe Sportif Municipal de Kaasba Tadla; Attendance: 0 (punishment); Referee: Mounir Mabrouk

21 September 2015 Second leg	IR Tanger	1–2 (2–3 agg.)	OC Khouribga	Tangier
18:00 UTC	Rafik 36' (pen.); El Ghrib (yellow card) 52'; El Helali (yellow card) 85'		Diomande 47'; Tiberkanine 53' (pen.); Mezkouri (yellow card) 75'; Bennay (yellow card) 90+1'	Stadium: Stade Ibn Batouta; Referee: Youssef Harraoui

==== 2016 ====
Win Draw Loss

===== Round of 32 =====
11 June 2016 First leg	IR Tanger	4–0	MA Tétouan	Tangier
22:00 UTC	Alexis (yellow card) 6'; Hammoudan (yellow card) 15'; Hervé 34' (yellow card) 73'; El Helali 39'; Boukhriss 67'; Mouaoui 74'		Krouch (penalty missed) 81'	Stadium: Stade Ibn Batouta; Referee: Karim Sabri

18 June 2016 Second leg	MA Tétouan	2–0 (2–4 agg.)	IR Tanger	Tétouan
22:00 UTC	Krouch 55', 90+1'		Boukhriss (yellow card); El Helali (yellow card)	Stadium: Stade Saniat Rmel; Attendance: 0 Referee: Samir Guezzaz
