= 2016–17 IR Tanger season =

Tanger
2016–17 season
- President: Abdelhamid Abarchan
- Head Coach: Abdelhak Benchikha (until 16 April 2017); Mohamed Sabek (interim) (until 30 April 2017); Bachir Bouita (until 27 May 2017)
- Stadium: Stade Ibn Batouta
- Botola: 5th
- Coupe du Trône: Semi-finals
- CAF Confederation Cup: Play-off round
- Top goalscorer: League: Ahmed Hammoudan (6); All: Ahmed Hammoudan (9)
- Average home league attendance: 36,333
Home colours	Away colours	Third colours

The 2016–17 season is Ittihad Riadi Tanger's 34th in existence and the club's 18th season in the top flight of Moroccan football, and second consecutive season in the first division of Moroccan football after an absence of eight years. The team participated in CAF Confederation Cup for the first time in his history after finishing third in the domestic championship.

== Kit ==
Supplier: Bang Sports / Main Sponsors: front: Moroccan Airports Authority, University of New England; APM Terminals / League Sponsor: front: Maroc Telecom

Home	Away	Third

== Players ==
=== squad ===
As of 23 April 2017

Note: Flags indicate national team as defined under FIFA eligibility rules; some limited exceptions apply. Players may hold more than one non-FIFA nationality.

No.	Pos.	Nation	Player
1	GK	MAR	Mohamed Amsif
2	DF	MAR	Zakaria Melhaoui
5	DF	MAR	Jamal Ait Lamaalem
7	FW	MAR	Yahya Boumediene
8	MF	MAR	Soufiane Gadoum
9	FW	MAR	Ismaël Daoud
10	MF	MAR	Youcef Sekour
11	FW	MAR	Ahmed Hammoudan
13	FW	CGO	Ismaël Ankobo
14	DF	MAR	Mehdi Baltham
16	MF	MAR	Ahmed Chentouf
17	FW	MAR	Abdelghani Mouaoui
19	FW	MLI	Abdoulaye Diarra ^{*}

No.	Pos.	Nation	Player
20	FW	MAR	Soufian El Hassnaoui
21	MF	MAR	Bakr El Helali (vice-captain)
22	GK	MAR	Mehdi Ouaya
23	FW	MAR	Younes Ed-dyb
24	MF	MAR	Adil Chihi ^{*}
25	DF	BIH	Enes Šipović
27	DF	MAR	Ismail Benlamalem
28	GK	MAR	Aissam Badda
29	DF	MAR	Oussama El Ghrib (captain)
31	DF	MAR	Ayoub El Khaliqi (N° 30 in CCC)
71	MF	CIV	Hervé Guy (N° 18 in CCC)
93	MF	SEN	Ousseynou Thioune (N° 15 in CCC)
99	FW	MAR	Youness Hawassi (N° 26 in CCC)
—	GK	MAR	Badr El Hamadi ^{*}

^{*} Not in the CCC squad list.

==== From youth squad ====
Note: Flags indicate national team as defined under FIFA eligibility rules; some limited exceptions apply. Players may hold more than one non-FIFA nationality.

No.	Pos.	Nation	Player
12	GK	MAR	Mohamed El Haddad
15	DF	MAR	Ayoub Jarfi
32	MF	MAR	Abdelali Assri
33	FW	MAR	Ayoub Ouldhamra

No.	Pos.	Nation	Player
34	DF	MAR	Hicham Zghari
35	DF	MAR	Zakaria Boulaich
37	MF	MAR	Abdelghafour Jebroun
55	DF	MAR	Yasser Imrani

==== Out during the season ====
Note: Flags indicate national team as defined under FIFA eligibility rules; some limited exceptions apply. Players may hold more than one non-FIFA nationality.

No. / Pos. / Nation / Player; 20 / MF / MAR / Adil El Masskini	No. / Pos. / Nation / Player; 91 / FW / MAR / Omar Mansouri

=== Transfers ===
==== In (summer) ====
Note: Flags indicate national team as defined under FIFA eligibility rules; some limited exceptions apply. Players may hold more than one non-FIFA nationality.

No.	Pos.	Nation	Player
14	DF	MAR	Mehdi Baltham (from Nahdat Berkane) IRTfoot.ma
91	FW	MAR	Omar Mansouri (from Kawkab Marrakech) IRTfoot.ma
99	FW	MAR	Youness Hawassi (from Moghreb Tétouan) IRTfoot.ma
20	MF	MAR	Adil El Masskini (from KAC Kénitra) IRTfoot.ma
7	FW	MAR	Yahya Boumediene (from (Belgium) Royal Excel Mouscron) IRTfoot.ma
1	GK	MAR	Mohamed Amsif (from (Germany) 1. FC Union Berlin) IRTfoot.ma
8	MF	MAR	Soufiane Gadoum (from Raja Casablanca) IRTfoot.ma
27	DF	MAR	Ismail Belmaalem (from Qatar SC) IRTfoot.ma
93	MF	SEN	Ousseynou Thioune (from (Senegal) Diambars FC) IRTfoot.ma
22	GK	MAR	Mehdi Ouaya (from Union de Touarga) IRTfoot.ma
19	FW	MLI	Abdoulaye Diarra (from (Mali) CO de Bamako) IRTfoot.ma
9	MF	MAR	Ismaël Daoud (from (Belgium) RC de Schaerbeek) IRTfoot.ma
28	GK	MAR	Issam Badda (from Kawkab Marrakech) IRTfoot.ma

==== Out (Summer) ====
Note: Flags indicate national team as defined under FIFA eligibility rules; some limited exceptions apply. Players may hold more than one non-FIFA nationality.

No.	Pos.	Nation	Player
9	FW	CMR	Brice Owona (contract termination) IRTfoot.ma
4	MF	MAR	Adil Lamrabet (to Raja Beni Mellal) IRTfoot.ma
10	FW	MAR	Badr Kachani (to RSB Berkane) IRTfoot.ma
21	MF	MAR	Abdessamad Rafik (to Hassania Agadir) IRTfoot.ma
32	DF	MAR	Mustapha El Khalfi (to MAS Fez) IRTfoot.ma
90	GK	MAR	Marouane Fakhr (to Chabab Atlas Khénifra) IRTfoot.ma
27	MF	MAR	Abdessamad Imaich (to Olympique Khouribga) IRTfoot.ma
14	MF	CMR	Alexis Enam (contract termination) IRTfoot.ma
33	DF	MAR	Abdelfettah Boukhriss (loan return to FUS Rabat, later signed by Olympic Safi) IRTfoot.ma
1	GK	MAR	Mohamed Bistara (to Widad Tanger)
12	GK	MAR	Youness Barak (released)
13	FW	MAR	Abdelaali El Abboubi (to Olympique Khouribga) IRTfoot.ma

==== In (winter) ====
Note: Flags indicate national team as defined under FIFA eligibility rules; some limited exceptions apply. Players may hold more than one non-FIFA nationality.

No.	Pos.	Nation	Player
23	FW	MAR	Younes Ed-dyb (from Fath Ouislane) IRTfoot.ma
13	FW	CGO	Ismaël Ankobo (from (Republic of the Congo) AS Kondzo) IRTfoot.ma
20	FW	MAR	Soufian El Hassnaoui (free) IRTfoot.ma
24	MF	MAR	Adil Chihi (from (Germany) FSV Frankfurt) IRTfoot.ma

==== Out (winter) ====
Note: Flags indicate national team as defined under FIFA eligibility rules; some limited exceptions apply. Players may hold more than one non-FIFA nationality.

No.	Pos.	Nation	Player
91	FW	MAR	Omar Mansouri (to Raja Casablanca) IRTfoot.ma
20	MF	MAR	Adil El Masskini (to Olympic Safi) IRTfoot.ma
84	GK	MAR	Ahmed Mohamadina (contract termination) IRTfoot.ma
6	MF	MAR	Adnane Cherradi (released) IRTfoot.ma

=== Technical staff ===
Position	Name
First team head coach	(Algeria) Abdelhak Benchikha
Assistant coach	(Morocco) Abderrazak Belarabi
Goalkeeping coach	(Morocco) Mohamed Jbari
Fitness coach	(Morocco) Abdelhakim Mouchriq
Sporting director	(Morocco) Mohamed Sabek "Simo"
B team coach	(Morocco) Jaafar R'kyek

until 16 April 2017

Position	Name
First team head coach	(Morocco) Mohamed Sabek "Simo"
Assistant coach	(Morocco) Mohamed Jbari
Fitness coach	(Morocco) Abdelhakim Mouchriq

until 30 April 2017

Position	Name
First team head coach	(Morocco) Bachir Bouita
Assistant coach	(Morocco) Mohamed Sabek "Simo"
Goalkeeping coach	(Morocco) Mohamed Jbari
Fitness coach	(Morocco) Abdelhakim Mouchriq

== Statistics ==
=== Goal scorers ===
No.	Pos.	Nation	Name	Botola	Coupe du Trône	CAF Confederation Cup	Total
11	FW	(Morocco)	Ahmed Hammoudan	6	0	3	9
27	DF	(Morocco)	Ismail Belmaalem	3	2	2	7
71	MF	(Ivory Coast)	Hervé Guy	5	0	1	6
17	FW	(Morocco)	Abdelghani Mouaoui	4	2	0	6
25	DF	(Bosnia and Herzegovina)	Enes Šipović	4	0	1	5
31	DF	(Morocco)	Ayoub El Khaliqi	3	0	0	3
10	MF	(Morocco)	Youssef Sekour	2	1	0	3
99	FW	(Morocco)	Youness Hawassi	2	0	0	2
14	DF	(Morocco)	Mehdi Baltham	2	0	0	2
21	MF	(Morocco)	Bakre El Helali	0	1	1	2
16	MF	(Morocco)	Ahmed Chentouf	1	0	0	1
13	FW	(Republic of the Congo)	Ismaël Ankobo	0	0	1	1
TOTAL				33	6	9	48

=== Assists ===
No.	Pos.	Nation	Name	Botola	Coupe du Trône	CAF Confederation Cup	Total
17	FW	(Morocco)	Abdelghani Mouaoui	3	0	2	5
99	FW	(Morocco)	Youness Hawassi	2	1	1	4
16	MF	(Morocco)	Ahmed Chentouf	3	0	0	3
93	MF	(Senegal)	Ousseynou Thioune	2	1	0	3
11	FW	(Morocco)	Ahmed Hammoudan	1	1	1	3
29	DF	(Morocco)	Oussama El Ghrib	1	0	2	3
71	MF	(Ivory Coast)	Hervé Guy	2	0	0	2
19	FW	(Mali)	Abdoulaye Diarra	2	0	0	2
21	MF	(Morocco)	Bakre El Helali	1	0	0	1
27	DF	(Morocco)	Ismail Belmaalem	1	0	0	1
8	MF	(Morocco)	Soufiane Gadoum	0	1	0	1
25	DF	(Bosnia and Herzegovina)	Enes Šipović	0	1	0	1
20	MF	(Morocco)	Soufian El Hassnaoui	0	0	1	1
TOTAL				18	5	7	30

=== Hat-tricks ===
Player	Against	Result	Date	Competition
(Morocco) Ahmed Hammoudan	(Guinea) AS Kaloum Star	3–0 (H)	18 March 2017	CAF Confederation Cup

(H) – Home; (A) – Away

=== Clean sheets ===
As of 25 May 2017.

Rank	Name	Botola	Coupe du Trône	CAF Confederation Cup	Total	Played Games
1	(Morocco) Mohamed Amsif	11	3	2	16	36
28	(Morocco) Aissam Badda	2	0	0	2	6
Total		13	3	2	18	42

=== Disciplinary record ===
N	P	Nat.	Name	Botola			Coupe du Trône			CAF Confederation Cup			Total			Notes
N	P	Nat.	Name	Yellow card	Second yellow card	Red card	Yellow card	Second yellow card	Red card	Yellow card	Second yellow card	Red card	Yellow card	Second yellow card	Red card	Notes
1	GK	(Morocco)	Mohamed Amsif	3						1			4			
5	DF	(Morocco)	Jamal Ait Lamaalem	1									1			
7	FW	(Morocco)	Yahya Boumediene	2									2			
10	MF	(Morocco)	Youssef Sekour	5									5			
11	FW	(Morocco)	Ahmed Hammoudan	3									3			
14	DF	(Morocco)	Mehdi Baltham	3									3			
16	MF	(Morocco)	Ahmed Chentouf	1									1			
17	FW	(Morocco)	Abdelghani Mouaoui	2						1			3			
21	MF	(Morocco)	Bakre El Helali	3		1	1			3			7		1	
22	GK	(Morocco)	Mehdi Ouaya			1									1	
25	DF	(Bosnia and Herzegovina)	Enes Šipović	4									4			
27	DF	(Morocco)	Ismail Belmaalem	4									4			
28	GK	(Morocco)	Issam Badda	1									1			
29	DF	(Morocco)	Oussama El Ghrib	5			1			1			7			
31	DF	(Morocco)	Ayoub El Khaliqi	4		1			1	1			5		2	
37	MF	(Morocco)	Abdelghafour Jebroun	1									1			
55	DF	(Morocco)	Yasser Imrani	1									1			
71	MF	(Ivory Coast)	Hervé Guy	3		1							3		1	
93	MF	(Senegal)	Ousseynou Thioune	8	2		3						11	2		
99	FW	(Morocco)	Youness Hawassi	3									3			
~~20~~	MF	(Morocco)	Adil El Masskini	1									1			

Last updated: 25 May 2017
Source: mountakhab.net
Only competitive matches
(yellow card) = Number of bookings; (second yellow card) = Number of sending offs after a second yellow card; (red card) = Number of sending offs by a direct red card.

=== Squad statistics ===
As of 25 May 2017.

No.	Pos	Nat	Player	Total		Botola		Coupe du Trône		CAF Confederation Cup	
No.	Pos	Nat	Player	Apps	Goals	Apps	Goals	Apps	Goals	Apps	Goals
1	GK	(Morocco) MAR	Mohamed Amsif	36	-29	24	(−20)	6	(−3)	6	(-6)
2	DF	(Morocco) MAR	Zakaria Melhaoui	13	0	9	0	3	0	1	0
5	DF	(Morocco) MAR	Jamal Ait Lamaalem	8	0	6	0	2	0	0	0
7	FW	(Morocco) MAR	Yahya Boumediene	6	0	5	0	1	0	0	0
8	MF	(Morocco) MAR	Soufiane Gadoum	21	0	13	0	4	0	4	0
9	FW	(Morocco) MAR	Ismaël Daoud	12	0	8	0	0	0	4	0
10	MF	(Morocco) MAR	Youssef Sekour	25	3	19	2	4	1	2	0
11	FW	(Morocco) MAR	Ahmed Hammoudan	36	9	25	6	5	0	6	3
13	FW	(Republic of the Congo) CGO	Ismaël Ankobo	15	1	11	0	0	0	4	1
14	DF	(Morocco) MAR	Mehdi Baltham	15	2	11	2	3	0	1	0
15	DF	(Morocco) MAR	Ayoub Jarfi	6	0	6	0	0	0	0	0
16	MF	(Morocco) MAR	Ahmed Chentouf	13	1	8	1	1	0	4	0
17	FW	(Morocco) MAR	Abdelghani Mouaoui	35	6	27	4	6	2	2	0
19	FW	(Mali) MLI	Abdoulaye Diarra	16	0	11	0	5	0	0	0
20	MF	(Morocco) MAR	Soufian El Hassnaoui	8	0	5	0	0	0	3	0
21	MF	(Morocco) MAR	Bakre El Helali	28	3	17	1	6	1	5	1
23	FW	(Morocco) MAR	Younes Ed-dyb	6	0	4	0	0	0	2	0
24	MF	(Morocco) MAR	Adil Chihi	3	0	3	0	0	0	0	0
25	DF	(Bosnia and Herzegovina) BIH	Enes Šipović	35	5	26	4	3	0	6	1
27	DF	(Morocco) MAR	Ismail Belmaalem	34	7	22	3	6	2	6	2
28	GK	(Morocco) MAR	Issam Badda	6	-5	6	(−5)	0	(−0)	0	(-0)
29	DF	(Morocco) MAR	Oussama El Ghrib	41	0	29	0	6	0	6	0
31	DF	(Morocco) MAR	Ayoub El Khaliqi	34	3	23	3	5	0	6	0
32	MF	(Morocco) MAR	Abdelali Assri	4	0	4	0	0	0	0	0
33	FW	(Morocco) MAR	Ayoub Ouldhamra	3	0	3	0	0	0	0	0
35	DF	(Morocco) MAR	Zakaria Boulaich	2	0	2	0	0	0	0	0
37	MF	(Morocco) MAR	Abdelghafour Jebroun	2	0	2	0	0	0	0	0
55	DF	(Morocco) MAR	Yasser Imrani	2	0	2	0	0	0	0	0
71	MF	(Ivory Coast) CIV	Hervé Guy	30	6	23	5	2	0	5	1
93	MF	(Senegal) SEN	Ousseynou Thioune	38	0	26	0	6	0	6	0
99	FW	(Morocco) MAR	Youness Hawassi	33	2	23	2	6	0	4	0
Players left the club in transfer windows or mid-season
~~20~~	MF	(Morocco) MAR	Adil El Masskini	11	0	8	0	3	0	0	0
~~91~~	FW	(Morocco) MAR	Omar Mansouri	8	0	7	0	1	0	0	0

== Pre-season and friendlies ==
Win Draw Loss

27 July 2016 1	IR Tanger (Morocco)	5–0	(Morocco) CS Fnideq	Tangier, Morocco
17:00 UTC+1	El Helali 8', 37'; Hawassi 25'; Boumediene 51', 90'			Stadium: Stade Centre Ziaten

3 August 2016 2	IR Tanger (Morocco)	1–0	(Morocco) Raja CA	Tangier, Morocco
21:00 UTC+1	Hamoudane 30'			Stadium: Stade Ibn Batouta

7 August 2016 3	IR Tanger (Morocco)	7–0	(Morocco) Chabab Ben Diban	Tangier, Morocco
10:30 UTC+1	Sekour 26' (pen.); Chentouf 60'; Mouaoui 62'; Hervé 82'; El Masskini 83'; Daoud 84'; Boumediene 87'			Stadium: Stade Centre Ziaten

12 August 2016 4	WS Témara (Morocco)	0–2	(Morocco) IR Tanger	Bouskoura, Morocco
17:00 UTC+1			Hawassi 30'; El Masskini 77'	Stadium: Stade Centre Wellness

15 August 2016 5	RC Oued Zem (Morocco)	1–1	(Morocco) IR Tanger	Berrechid, Morocco
17:00 UTC+1	Goal		El Abboubi 35'	Stadium: Stade municipal de Berrechid

18 August 2016 6	CAY Berrechid (Morocco)	0–0	(Morocco) IR Tanger	Berrechid, Morocco
18:00 UTC+1				Stadium: Stade municipal de Berrechid

8 October 2016 7	IR Tanger (Morocco)	5–0	(Morocco) Chabab Ben Diban	Tangier, Morocco
11:00 UTC+1	El Masskini 25'; Diarra 70', 83', 84'; Boumediene 90'			Stadium: Stade Centre Ziaten

12 November 2016 8	IR Tanger (Morocco)	6–0	(Morocco) Raja Boughaz	Tangier, Morocco
12:00 UTC	Mouaoui 15', 55'; Hervé 20'; Mensouri 65', 75'; Cherradi 70'			Stadium: Stade Centre Ziaten

13 November 2016 9	IR Tanger (Morocco)	5–2	(Morocco) Chabab Asilah	Tangier, Morocco
12:00 UTC	Daoud 7'; Chentouf 11'; Mensouri 30'; Baltham 70'; Hawassi 75'		43'	Stadium: Stade Centre Ziaten

11 January 2017 10	IR Tanger (Morocco)	3–0	(Morocco) Raja Boughaz	Tangier, Morocco
--:-- UTC	El Hassnaoui 6'; Ed-dyb 48'; Chihi 72'			Stadium: Stade Centre Ziaten

14 January 2017 11	Chabab Asilah (Morocco)	1–7	(Morocco) IR Tanger	Asilah, Morocco
--:-- UTC	Goal		Ed-dyb 1'; Benlamalem 19'; Chihi 29'; Daoud 56', 90'; El Helali 65'; Melhaoui 70'	Stadium: Stade Municipal d'Asilah

22 January 2017 12	IR Tanger (Morocco)	1–0	(Algeria) CR Belouizdad	Tangier, Morocco
16:00 UTC	Hammoudan 12'			Stadium: Stade Ibn Batouta

28 January 2017 13	CR Al Hoceima (Morocco)	0–0	(Morocco) IR Tanger	Asilah, Morocco
11:00 UTC				Stadium: Stade Municipal d'Asilah

16 May 2017 14	IR Tanger (Morocco)	2–0	(Morocco) Chabab Ben Diban	Tangier, Morocco
--:-- UTC+1	El Helali; Oueld El Hamra			Stadium: Stade Centre Ziaten

== Competitions ==
=== Overview ===
Competition	Record							
Competition	Pld	W	D	L	GF	GA	GD	Win %
Botola	30	12	9	9	33	25	+8	40.00
Coupe du Trône	6	2	4	0	6	3	+3	33.33
CAF Confederation Cup	6	4	0	2	9	6	+3	66.67
Total	42	18	13	11	48	34	+14	42.86

Last updated: 25 May 2017
Source: Competitions

=== Botola ===
==== League table ====
Pos	Team	Pld	W	D	L	GF	GA	GD	Pts	Qualification or relegation
3	Raja Casablanca	30	15	12	3	42	17	+25	57	Qualification to the CAF Confederation Cup
4	RS Berkane	30	14	9	7	30	16	+14	51	Qualification to the CAF Confederation Cup
5	IR Tanger	30	12	9	9	33	25	+8	45	
6	AS FAR	30	11	11	8	42	39	+3	44	
7	FUS Rabat	30	11	7	12	32	32	0	40	invited to the Arab Club Champions Cup (Note: Wydad Casablanca and Raja Casablanca are also invited to the Arab Club Champions Cup.)

Updated to match(es) played on 13 June 2017. Source: scoresway.com
Rules for classification: 1) points; 2) goal difference; 3) number of goals scored.

==== Results summary ====
Overall								Home						Away					
Pld	W	D	L	GF	GA	GD	Pts	W	D	L	GF	GA	GD	W	D	L	GF	GA	GD
30	12	9	9	33	25	+8	45	7	4	4	17	11	+6	5	5	5	16	14	+2

Last updated: 25 May 2017.
Source: Competitive matches

==== Results by round ====
Round	1	2	3	4	5	6	7	8	9	10	11	12	13	14	15	16	17	18	19	20	21	22	23	24	25	26	27	28	29	30
Ground	H	A	H	A	A	H	A	H	A	H	A	H	A	H	A	A	H	A	H	H	A	H	A	H	A	H	A	H	A	H
Result	W	W	W	W	D	D	W	D	L	W	D	W	D	W	D	L	W	D	L	D	W	W	L	L	L	L	W	D	L	W
Position	2	2	1	1	1	3	1	3	3	3	4	3	4	3	3	5	5	5	5	5	5	5	6	6	6	6	6	6	6	5

Updated to match(es) played on 25 May 2017. Source: League matches
A = Away; H = Home; W = Win; D = Draw; L = Loss

==== Matches ====
27 August 2016 1	IR Tanger	4–1	DH Jadida	Tangier
21:15 UTC+1	Šipović 34'; El Khaliqi 51'; Mouaoui 55'; El Ghrib (yellow card) 72'; Hervé 86'	Report	Bamaamar (yellow card) 67'; Azaro 81'	Stadium: Stade Ibn Batouta; Referee: Samir Guezzaz

17 September 2016 2	Kénitra AC	0–2	IR Tanger	Kenitra
17:00 UTC+1	Rhattas (yellow card) 75'	Report	Thioune (yellow card) 39'; Sekour 43'; Hawassi 51'; El Khaliqi (yellow card) 70'	Stadium: Stade Municipal; Referee: Taoufik Gourar

24 September 2016 3	IR Tanger	2–1	JS Kasbah Tadla	Tangier
17:00 UTC+1	Hammoudan 7', 46'; El Ghrib (yellow card) 23'	Report	Hadda (yellow card) 39'; Benhomes 49'; Abbadi (yellow card) 60'; Ayach (yellow card) 60'	Stadium: Stade Ibn Batouta; Referee: Mohamed Belloute

15 October 2016 5	CA Khénifra	0–0	IR Tanger	Khénifra
16:00 UTC+1	Oumansour (yellow card) 45'	Report		Stadium: Stade Municipal; Referee: Noureddine Jaafari

22 October 2016 6	IR Tanger	0–0	HUS Agadir	Tangier
18:00 UTC+1	Benlamalem (yellow card) 58'	Report	Talal (yellow card) 29'; Camara (yellow card) 38'	Stadium: Stade Ibn Batouta; Referee: Karim Sabri

29 October 2016 7	OC Safi	1–2	IR Tanger	Safi
15:00 UTC+1	Rami 22'; Edjomariegwe (yellow card) 26'	Report	Šipović 31'; Mouaoui 79'; Amsif (yellow card) 89'	Stadium: Stade El Massira; Referee: Taoufik Gourar

5 November 2016 8	IR Tanger	1–1	Fath US	Tangier
19:00 UTC	El Masskini (yellow card) 30'; El Khaliqi (yellow card) 63'; Hammoudan 81'; Hawassi (yellow card) 90+3'	Report	Jahouh (yellow card) 60'; Fouzair (red card) 66'; Nahiri 85'; Benarif (yellow card) 90+2'	Stadium: Stade Ibn Batouta; Attendance: 0 (punishment); Referee: Noureddine Brahim

19 November 2016 9	KAC Marrakech	2–1	IR Tanger	Marrakesh
19:15 UTC	Brarou (yellow card) 34'; Ayati 47'; El Fakih 48'	Report	Hawassi 24'; El Helali (yellow card) 73'; Thioune (yellow card) 86'	Stadium: Stade de Marrakech; Referee: Mohamed Belloute

26 November 2016 10	IR Tanger	1–0	OC Khouribga	Tangier
17:00 UTC	El Helali 85'	Report	Ramzi (yellow card) 87'	Stadium: Stade Ibn Batouta; Attendance: 0 (punishment); Referee: Redouane Jiyed

3 December 2016 11	Wydad AC	2–2	IR Tanger	Marrakesh
15:00 UTC	Jebor 27', 37'; Nekkach (yellow card) 54'; Bencharki (yellow card) 71'	Report	Hammoudan 11'; Mouaoui 18'; Hervé (yellow card) 33'; El Helali (yellow card) 39' (red card) 75'; Baltham (yellow card) 44'; Šipović (yellow card) 57'; El Ghrib (yellow card) 72'	Stadium: Stade de Marrakech; Referee: Adil Zourak

7 December 2016 4	Raja CA	0–1	IR Tanger	Marrakesh
15:00 UTC		Report	Mouaoui (penalty missed) 5'; Sekour (yellow card) 30'; El Khaliqi 85'; Amsif (yellow card) 90+3'	Stadium: Stade de Marrakech; Referee: Samir Guezzaz
Note: The match, originally scheduled for 8 October 2016, was postponed at the request of Raja CA because of the participation of four players of the squad with national teams.

11 December 2016 12	IR Tanger	0–1	MA Tétouan	Tangier
19:15 UTC	Amsif (yellow card) 26'; Hawassi (yellow card) 43'	Report	Krouch 27' (pen.) (yellow card) 56'; El Barrak (yellow card) 55'; Naïm (yellow card) 81'	Stadium: Stade Ibn Batouta; Attendance: 0 (punishment); Referee: Bouchaib El Ahrach

18 December 13	RS Berkane	0–0	IR Tanger	Berkane
17:00 UTC	Housni (yellow card) 46'; Akhmis (yellow card) 88'	Report	Hervé (yellow card) 35' (red card) 62'; Hammoudan (yellow card) 54'; Thioune (yellow card) 54'; Sekour (yellow card) 64'; Baltham (yellow card) 90'	Stadium: Stade Municipal (Berkane); Referee: Daki Radad

25 December 2016 14	IR Tanger	4–1	CR Al-Hoceima	Tangier
15:00 UTC	Chentouf 10'; Thioune (yellow card) 55'; Sekour 60'; Baltham 73', 90+1'	Report	Ahmdoch (yellow card) 34'; Makran 63'; Lyousfi (yellow card) 72'	Stadium: Stade Ibn Batouta; Referee: Jalal Jayed

1 January 2017 15	AS FAR	0–0	IR Tanger	Rabat
17:30 UTC	Berrahma (yellow card) 62'	Report	Sekour (yellow card) 37'; Baltham (yellow card) 90+2'	Stadium: Prince Moulay Abdellah Stadium; Referee: Noureddine Jaafari

4 February 2017 16	DH Jadida	4–1	IR Tanger	El Jadida
14:00 UTC	Hadraf 3', 38' (pen.), 49' (pen.) (yellow card) 40'; Bamaamar (yellow card) 7'; Lagrou (yellow card) 19'; Ahaddad 32'; Diakité (red card) 83'	Report	Hammoudan (yellow card) 19'; Benlamalem 27' (pen.) (yellow card) 38'; Thioune (yellow card) 45'; Ait Lamaalem (yellow card) 48'	Stadium: Stade El Abdi; Referee: Adil Zourak

22 February 2017 17	IR Tanger	1–0	Kénitra AC	Tangier
19:00 UTC	Hervé (yellow card) 27'; Thioune (yellow card) 68' (yellow-red card) 90'; Benlamalem 87'	Report	Mansour Ba (yellow card) 29'; Dahmani (yellow card) 72'; Mesyaf (yellow card) 87'	Stadium: Stade Ibn Batouta; Referee: Abdelouahed Fatihi
Note: The match, originally scheduled for 11 February 2017, was pushed back because of the involvement of Tanger at the 2017 CAF Confederation Cup

26 February 2017 19	IR Tanger	1–2	Raja CA	Tangier
15:00 UTC	Hervé 35' (pen.); El Ghrib (yellow card) 57'; Mouaoui (yellow card) 62'; Šipović (yellow card) 90+4'	Report	Mansouri 66'; Mabidi 82'	Stadium: Stade Ibn Batouta; Referee: Redouane Jiyed

1 March 2017 18	JS Kasbah Tadla	1–1	IR Tanger	Kasbah Tadla
15:00 UTC	Dghoughi 64'	Report	Benlamalem 47'; Hawassi (yellow card) 57'; Thioune (yellow card) 63' (yellow-red card) 88'; Boumediene (yellow card) 65'	Stadium: Complexe Sportif Municipal (Kasbah Tadla); Referee: Taoufik Gourar
Note: The match, originally scheduled for 17 February 2017, was pushed back because of the involvement of Tanger at the 2017 CAF Confederation Cup

5 March 2017 20	IR Tanger	0–0	CA Khénifra	Tangier
17:00 UTC	Sekour (yellow card) 36'	Report	Largou (yellow card) 45'; El Hardoumi (yellow card) 55'; Mame Saher (yellow card) 74'; El Gourch (yellow card) 82'	Stadium: Stade Ibn Batouta; Referee: Hassan Rahmani

2 April 2017 21	HUS Agadir	0–4	IR Tanger	Agadir
16:00 UTC+1	El Berkaoui (yellow card) 11'	Report	Hervé 1'; El Khaliqi 40'; Hammoudan 44', 90'; El Ghrib (yellow card) 48'; Benlamalem (yellow card) 55'	Stadium: Stade Adrar; Referee: Samir Guezzaz
Note: The match, originally scheduled for 12 March 2017, was pushed back because of the involvement of Tanger at the 2017 CAF Confederation Cup

19 April 2017 22	IR Tanger	1–0	OC Safi	Tangier
17:00 UTC+1	Chentouf (yellow card) 43'; Šipović 55'	Report	Namli (yellow card) 6'; Attiyat (yellow card) 59'; Ait Khorsa (yellow card) 66' (yellow-red card) 85'; Sebbar (yellow card) 77'	Stadium: Stade Ibn Batouta; Referee: Khaled Ennouni
Note: The match, originally scheduled for 19 March 2017, was pushed back because of the involvement of Tanger at the 2017 CAF Confederation Cup

23 April 2017 25	OC Khouribga	2–1	IR Tanger	Khouribga
18:15 UTC+1	Tighazaoui 26', 41'	Report	Šipović 15' (yellow card) 25'; Thioune (yellow card) 77'	Stadium: Complexe OCP; Referee: Abderrahim Yagoubi

26 April 2017 23	Fath US	1–0	IR Tanger	Rabat
19:00 UTC+1	El Bassil 37' (yellow card) 90'; Louadni (yellow card) 45'; Aguerd (yellow card) 90+6'	Report	Šipović (yellow card) 59'	Stadium: Stade Prince Moulay Al Hassan; Referee: Jalal Jayed
Note: The match, originally scheduled for 8 April 2017, was pushed back because of the involvement of Tanger at the 2017 CAF Confederation Cup

30 April 2017 26	IR Tanger	0–1	Wydad AC	Tangier
16:00 UTC+1	Benlamalem (yellow card) 23'; El Khaliqi (yellow card) 61'; Hammoudan (yellow card) 66'; El Helali (yellow card) 72'	Report	Jebor 30'; Noussir (yellow card) 65'	Stadium: Stade Ibn Batouta; Referee: Hicham Tiyazi

3 May 2017 24	IR Tanger	0–2	KAC Marrakech	Tangier
16:00 UTC+1		Report	Amimi 83', 88' (yellow card) 89'	Stadium: Stade Ibn Batouta; Referee: Karim Sabri
Note: The match, originally scheduled for 14 April 2017, was pushed back because of the involvement of Tanger at the 2017 CAF Confederation Cup

7 May 2017 27	MA Tétouan	0–1	IR Tanger	Tétouan
16:30 UTC+1	Aboursas (yellow card) 35'; Abourazzouk (yellow card) 37'; Boumous (yellow card) 45'	Report	Hervé 38'; Ouaya (red card) 38'; El Khaliqi (yellow card) 61' (red card) 61'; Sekour (yellow card) 85'; Mouaoui (yellow card) 88'; Badda (yellow card) 90'	Stadium: Stade Saniat Rmel; Referee: Abdelouahed Fatihi

14 May 2017 28	IR Tanger	0–0	RS Berkane	Tangier
16:30 UTC+1		Report	Konate (yellow card) 33'; Laba (yellow card) 55'	Stadium: Stade Ibn Batouta; Referee: Adil Zourak

21 May 2017 29	CR Al-Hoceima	1–0	IR Tanger	Al Hoceima
16:00 UTC	Naji (yellow card) 25'; Labhiri 34'; Ben Ali (yellow card) 83'; Lahlali (yellow card) 83'	Report	Boumediene (yellow card) 26'; Thioune (yellow card) 41'	Stadium: Stade Mimoun Al Arsi; Referee: Daki Radad

25 May 2017 30	IR Tanger	2–1	AS FAR	Tangier
18:00 UTC	Jebroun (yellow card) 18'; Imrani (yellow card) 40'; Thioune (yellow card) 44'; Mouaoui 72'; Hervé 90+1'	Report	Elouadi 36'	Stadium: Stade Ibn Batouta; Referee: Jamal Belbasri

==== Results overview ====
Locations of the 2015–16 Botola teams

Win Draw Loss

Region	Team	Home score	Away score	Aggregate
Rabat-Salé-Kénitra	AS FAR	2–1	0–0	2–1
Rabat-Salé-Kénitra	Fath Union Sport	1–1	1–0	1–2
Rabat-Salé-Kénitra	KAC Kénitra	1–0	0–2	3–0
Casablanca-Settat	Difaâ El Jadidi	4–1	4–1	5–5
Casablanca-Settat	Raja Casablanca	1–2	0–1	2–2
Casablanca-Settat	Wydad Casablanca	0–1	2–2	2–3
Béni Mellal-Khénifra	Olympique Khouribga	1–0	2–1	2–2
Béni Mellal-Khénifra	Chabab Atlas Khénifra	0–0	0–0	0–0
Béni Mellal-Khénifra	JS de Kasbah Tadla	2–1	1–1	3–2
Tanger-Tetouan-Al Hoceima	Chabab Rif Al Hoceima	4–1	1–0	4–2
Tanger-Tetouan-Al Hoceima	Moghreb Tétouan	0–1	0–1	1–1
Marrakesh-Safi	Kawkab Marrakech	0–2	2–1	1–4
Marrakesh-Safi	Olympic Safi	1–0	1–2	3–1
Oriental	RSB Berkane	0–0	0–0	0–0
Souss-Massa	Hassania Agadir	0–0	0–4	4–0

=== Coupe du Trône ===
==== Round of 16 ====
5 September 2016 First leg	IR Tanger	2–0	OC Khouribga	Tangier
20:00 UTC+1	Mouaoui 42'; El Ghrib (yellow card) 45'; Thioune (yellow card) 55'; Belmaalem 88'		Tighazoui (yellow card) 32'; Ramzi (yellow card) 32'; Mbengue (yellow card) 78'	Stadium: Stade Ibn Batouta; Referee: Hicham Tiyazi

10 September 2016 Second leg	OC Khouribga	1–1 (1–3 agg.)	IR Tanger	Khouribga
21:15 UTC+1	El Mouatani (yellow card) 40'; Mbengue 90+3'		Thioune (yellow card) 40'; El Helali 58'	Stadium: Complexe OCP; Referee: Bouchaib El Ahrach

==== Quarter-finals ====
28 September 2016 First leg	IZ Khemisset	1–1	IR Tanger	Khemisset
18:15 UTC+1	Salhi 82'		Sekour 26'	Stadium: Stade du 18 novembre Referee: Daki Radad

2 October 2016 Second leg	IR Tanger	1–0 (2–1 agg.)	IZ Khemisset	Tangier
17:00 UTC+1	Thioune (yellow card); El Helali (yellow card); Mouaoui (penalty missed) 26' 39'; Khaliqi (red card) 78'		(red card) 29'	Stadium: Stade Ibn Batouta; Referee: Noureddine Brahim

==== Semi-finals ====
19 October 2016 First leg	Maghreb AS	0–0	IR Tanger	Fez
16:00 UTC+1				Stadium: Fez Stadium; Referee: Hicham Tiyazi

2 November 2016 Second leg	IR Tanger	1–1 (1–1a agg.)	Maghreb AS	Tangier
18:45 UTC	Belmaalem 49' (pen.)		Gouza 79' (pen.)	Stadium: Stade Ibn Batouta; Referee: Adil Zourak

=== CAF Confederation Cup ===
==== Qualifying rounds ====
Win Draw Loss

===== Preliminary round =====
11 February 2017 First leg	AS Douanes (Niger)	1–2	(Morocco) IR Tanger	Niamey, Niger
16:00 UTC+1	Sacko 5' (yellow card) 72'; Amadou (yellow card) 44'; Adje (yellow card) 64'	Report	El Helali 24' (yellow card) 60'; Šipović 58'; Mouaoui (yellow card) 73'; Amsif (yellow card) 81'	Stadium: Stade Général-Seyni-Kountché; Referee: Abou Coulibaly (Ivory Coast)

19 February 2017 Second leg	IR Tanger (Morocco)	1–0 (3–1 agg.)	(Niger) AS Douanes	Tangier, Morocco
19:00 UTC±0	Belmaalem 89'	Report		Stadium: Grand Stade de Tanger; Referee: Lotfi Bekouassa (Algeria)

===== First round =====
11 March 2017 First leg	AS Kaloum (Guinea)	1–0	(Morocco) IR Tanger	Conakry, Guinea
16:30 UTC±0	Bangoura (yellow card) 6'; Sylla 25'; Sylla (yellow card) 31'	Report	El Helali (yellow card) 58'; El Ghrib (yellow card) 78'	Stadium: Stade 28 Septembre; Referee: Abubakar Ago (Nigeria)

18 March 2017 Second leg	IR Tanger (Morocco)	3–0 (3–1 agg.)	(Guinea) AS Kaloum	Tangier, Morocco
17:00UTC±0	Hammoudan 33', 60', 68'; El Khaliqi (yellow card)	Report		Stadium: Grand Stade de Tanger; Referee: Fidel Gomes (Guinea-Bissau)

===== Play-off round =====
9 April 2017 First leg	Horoya AC (Guinea)	2–0	(Morocco) IR Tanger	Conakry, Guinea
16:00 UTC±0	Ouédraogo 17'; Mando 32'	Report	El Helali (yellow card) 36'	Stadium: Stade 28 Septembre; Referee: Juste Ephrem Zio (Burkina Faso)

15 April 2017 Second leg	IR Tanger (Morocco)	3–2 (3–4 agg.)	(Guinea) Horoya AC	Tangier, Morocco
20:00 UTC+1	Hervé 31' (pen.); Benlamalem 35' (pen.); Ankobo 89'	Report	Ouédraogo 48'; Sankhon 50'; Condé (red card) 90+3'	Stadium: Grand Stade de Tanger; Referee: Ibrahim Nour El Din (Egypt)

== Awards ==
Name	Position	Award	Ref.
(Morocco) Ahmed Hammoudan	Forward	Botola's Best Promising Player of the Season (2016–17)	

== See also ==
- 2015–16 IR Tanger season
