= Eisa Ali Abbas =

Emirati association football player (born 1996)

Eisa Ali عيسى علي
Personal information
- Full name: Eisa Ali Abbas Mohammed Bashir Al-Mazmi
- Date of birth: 29 September 1996 (age 30)
- Place of birth: Emirates
- Height: 1.68 m (5 ft 6 in)
- Position: Right back

Youth career
- 2010–2017: Al-Shabab

Senior career*
Years	Team	Apps	(Gls)
2017–2019	Emirates Club	14	(1)
2019–2024	Baniyas	40	(1)
2024–2025	Al Urooba	14	(0)
- * Club domestic league appearances and goals

Eisa Ali Abbas (Arabic:عيسى علي عباس) (born 29 September 1996) is an Emirati footballer who plays as a right back.

== Career ==
=== Al-Shabab ===
Eisa Ali started his career at Al-Shabab and is a product of the Al-Shabab's youth system.

=== Emirates Club ===
On 28 July 2017 left Al-Shabab and signed with Emirates Club, On 14 October 2017, Eisa Ali made his professional debut for Emirates Club against Shabab Al-Ahli in the Pro League, replacing Abdelghani Mouaoui.

=== Baniyas ===
On 1 June 2019 left Emirates Club and signed with Baniyas.
