= Cédric Djeugoué =

Cameroonian footballer

Personal information
- Date of birth: 28 August 1992 (age 34)
- Place of birth: Mankwa, Cameroon
- Height: 1.84 m (6 ft 0 in)
- Position: Centre back

Team information
- Current team: Forest Rangers
- Number: 25

Youth career
- ASPORES

Senior career*
Years	Team	Apps	(Gls)
2009–2010	Kadji SA		
2010–2012	Foullah Edifice		
2013	Douala AC		
2014–2015	Coton Sport		
2015–2016	IR Tanger	0	(0)
2017	New Star de Douala		
2018–2019	UMS de Loum		
2019–	Forest Rangers		

International career^{‡}
2013–2015	Cameroon	6	(0)
- * Club domestic league appearances and goals as of 16:09, 13 August 2020 (UTC) ‡ National team caps and goals as of 16:09, 13 August 2020 (UTC)

Cédric Djeugoué (born 28 August 1992) is a Cameroonian international footballer who plays for Forest Rangers as a centre back.

== Club career ==
Born in Mankwa, Djeugoué spent his early career with ASPORES and Kadji SA. He then played with Foullah Edifice in Chad, with Douala AC and Coton Sport in Cameroon, and with IR Tanger in Morocco.

He was close to signing for Malaysian club Kelantan FA in January 2017, but the deal fell through due to issues with his documentation.

After leaving Tanger he played for New Star de Douala, UMS de Loum and Forest Rangers.

== International career ==
Djeugoué made his international debut for Cameroon on 10 August 2013, starting in a 0–1 loss against Gabon.

He was selected as part of Cameroon's squad for the 2014 FIFA World Cup, and the 2015 Africa Cup of Nations.
