= IR Tanger =

Football club based in Tangier, Morocco

- Full name: Ittihad Riadi de Tanger
- Nickname: Faris Al Boughaz
- Short name: IRT
- Founded: 1957; 69 years ago
- Ground: Tangier Grand Stadium
- Capacity: 75,000
- Chairman: Nassrallah El Guartit
- Manager: Abdelhak Benchikha
- League: Botola Pro
- 2025–26: Botola Pro, 7th of 16
- Website: irtfoot.ma
Home colours	Away colours	Third colours

Ittihad Riadi Tanger (Arabic: الاتحاد الرياضي لطنجة; lit. 'Sports Union of Tangier'), often shortened to IR Tanger or the abbreviation IRT, is a Moroccan football club based in Tangier. It competes in the Botola Pro, Morocco's top professional football league.

The club was officially founded in 1957 under the name Unión Deportiva de Tánger (UDT). In 1983, several local football clubs were merged into UDT, resulting in the formation of Ittihad Riadi Tanger.

IR Tanger's home games are hosted at Tangier Grand Stadium. In the past, Stade de Marchan was their home stadium until its demolition.

IR Tanger has a large fan base in northern Morocco, particularly in the Tanger-Tetouan-Al Hoceima region.

== History ==
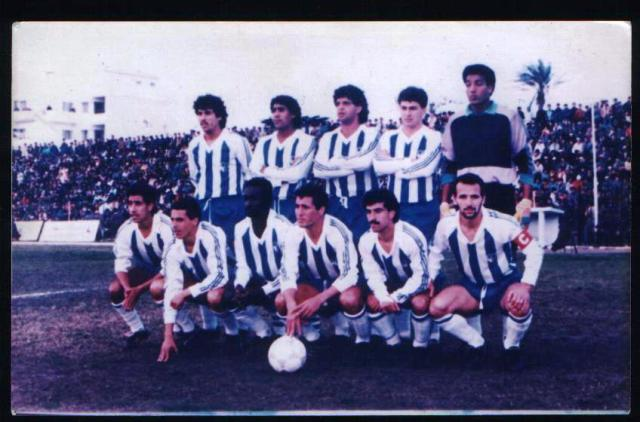
IR Tangier back in the late 1980s and 1990s.

IR Tanger was created by the fusion of several clubs in 1944. In the early 1990s, IR Tangier became one of the most successful clubs in the Botola. However, the club failed to win any trophies, although they came close in the 1989–90 season when they finished as runners-up. The 1989 season was considered by many to be their best season, as the team was victorious over many other notable Botola clubs, defeating Raja Casablanca 3-1 and Maghreb de Fès 3–0.

During the late 1990s, IR Tanger failed to achieve anything besides maintaining itself in the Botola. The club ended up getting relegated twice before the early 2000s, finishing unsuccessfully during the 1995–96 and 1997–98 seasons.

In July 2000, the club hired Coach Omar Raiss. He oversaw the improvement in the club's performance during the 2000–01 season, during which they scored 50 goals. Because of their performance, the club received a promotion. Their performance declined, however, with their only notable achievement in the early 2000s being a Throne Cup they won during the semi-final in the 2005–06 season. The following season became IR Tanger's last in the Botola for the next few years. During this time, the club's results were poor, and they would very often finish unsuccessfully.

During later years, after IR Tanger set up a new directive committee, it nearly made it back to the Botola during the 2013–14 season. With a series of transfers and the arrival of Coach Mohamed Amine Benhachem, the team cruised through the 2014–15 season, losing only twice and finishing first by a five-point lead.

During the 2015–16 season, the team made a comeback to the Botola Pro. The club contracted with many local and foreign players, finishing third in their first season and qualifying for the 2017 CAF Confederation Cup for the first time.

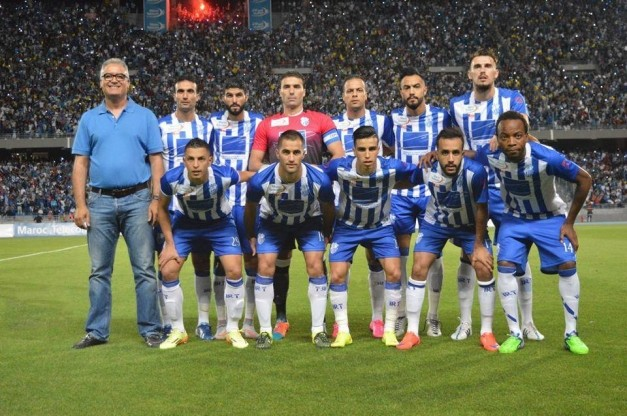
IR Tangiers team in 2015–16 Season

== Supporters and rivalries ==
In 2003, the club's ultras, called Ultras Tanger, was founded; this group no longer exists and has instead been replaced by the ultras group named Ultras Hercules that was founded in 2007.

IR Tanger has a rivalry with Moghreb Tétouan, which belongs to the neighboring city, Tétouan.

Botola Pro 1 matches
There were no matches between the teams in the First Division before 1990.
#	Date	Matchweek	Home team	Away team	Score (FT/HT)	Goals (Home)	Goals (Away)
1	1990		IR Tanger	MA Tetouan	4–1	?, ?, ?, ?	?
2	1991		MA Tetouan	IR Tanger	0–2		?, ?
1991–1995		There were no matches between the teams in the First Division. For the 1991–92 season, MA Tetouan was relegated to Second Division.					
3	1995		MA Tetouan	IR Tanger	1–0	?	
4	1996		IR Tanger	MA Tetouan	1–3	?	?, ?, ?
1996–2005		there were no matches between them in the First Division, each having returned to it at different moments, but not together.					
5	17 December 2005	12	MA Tetouan	IR Tanger	0–0 (0–0)		
6	21 May 2006	27	IR Tanger	MA Tetouan	0–1 (0–0)		Moussafi (88)
7	18 November 2006	8	IR Tanger	MA Tetouan	0–0 (0–0)		
8	8 April 2007	23	MA Tetouan	IR Tanger	1–0	?	
2007–2015		There were no matches between the teams in the First Division. For the 2006–07 season, IR Tanger was relegated to Second Division.					
9	3 October 2015	3	IR Tanger	MA Tetouan	2–2 (2–0)	Rafik (p. (28), Boukhriss (42)	El Maimouni (58), Krouch (64)
10	28 February 2016	18	MA Tetouan	IR Tanger	1–0 (0–0)	Hawassi (89)	
11	11 December 2016	12	IR Tanger	MA Tetouan	0–1 (0–1)	Krouch ((p. 27)	
12	7 May 2017	27	MA Tetouan	IR Tanger	0–1 (0–1)		Hervé (38)
13	27 December 2017	14	MA Tetouan	IR Tanger	0–1 (0–1		Hamoudan (45)
14	12 May 2018	29	IR Tanger	MA Tetouan	2–1 (0–1)	Chentouf 48), El Moussaoui (o.g. 60)	Fall (28)
15	22 September 2018	3	IR Tanger	MA Tetouan	1–1 (1–0)	El Ouadi (42)	Lakhal (69)
16	16 February 2019	18	MA Tetouan	IR Tanger	1–1 (1–0)	Hawassi (10)	El Ouadi (66)
17	11 January 2020	12	MA Tetouan	IR Tanger	0–0 (0–0)		
18	30 September 2020	27	IR Tanger	MA Tetouan	1–0 (1–0)	Ijroten (46)	
19	20 December 2020	4	IR Tanger	MA Tetouan	1–1 (1–1)	Méyé (p. 6)	Bemammer (o.g. 26)
20	23 May 2021	19	MA Tetouan	IR Tanger	1–0 (0–0)	Gueye (90+4)	
2021–2022		For the 2021–22 season, MA Tetouan was relegated to Second Division.					
21	9 September 2022	2	MA Tetouan	IR Tanger	1–0 (0–0)	Kamal (63)	
22	21 February 2023	17	IR Tanger	MA Tetouan	2–0 (2–0)	El Ouassli (7), Moutouali (18)	
23	26 November 2023	10	IR Tanger	MA Tetouan	1–1 (1–1)	El Wasti (45+2)	Badji (20)
24	14 April 2024	25	MA Tetouan	IR Tanger	1–1 (0–0)	Badji (p. 74)	Saoud (83)
25	23 November 2024	11	IR Tanger	MA Tetouan	1–2 (0–2)	Ghabra (p. 55)	Darai (12), Kamal (p. 19)
26	14 April 2025	26	MA Tetouan	IR Tanger	2–1 (2–0)	El Megri (3), Darai (15)	Moutouali (p. 50)
2025–2026		For the 2025–26 season, MA Tetouan was relegated to Second Division.					
27	2 October 2026	2	IR Tanger	MA Tetouan	1–1 (0–1)	Najari (57)	Karmoun (34)
28	2027	17	MA Tetouan	IR Tanger	– (–)		

Botola Pro 2 matches
#	Date	Matchweek	Home team	Away team	Score (FT/HT)	Goals (Home)	Goals (Away)
There is no data for the 1983/84–1986/87 and 1998/99 seasons.
	16 January 2000	14	MA Tetouan	IR Tanger	0–2		?, ?
	3 June 2000	29	IR Tanger	MA Tetouan	2–3	?, ?	?, ?, ?
	3 December 2000	10	MA Tetouan	IR Tanger	2–1	?, ?	?
	7 April 2001	25	IR Tanger	MA Tetouan	1–1		

Moroccan Throne Cup matches
Season	Round		Home team	Away team	Score (FT/HT)	Goals (Home)	Goals (Away)
1994–95	Round of 16		IR Tanger	MA Tetouan	2–1	?, ?	?
2000–01	Round of 32		IR Tanger	MA Tetouan	0–1		?
2016	Round of 32	1st leg	IR Tanger	MA Tetouan	4–0 (2–0)	Hervé (34), El Helali (39), Boukhriss (67), Mouaoui (74)	
2016	Round of 32	2nd leg	MA Tetouan	IR Tanger	2–0 (0–0)	Krouch (55, 90+1)	
2018	Round of 32		IR Tanger	MA Tetouan	1–0 (0–0)	M'baï	

Matches summary
	Matches	Wins		Draws	Goals		Home wins		Home draws		Away wins	
	Matches	IRT	MAT	Draws	IRT	MAT	IRT	MAT	IRT	MAT	IRT	MAT
Botola	27	7	10	10	24	24	4	6	6	4	3	4
Botola 2	4	1	2	1	6	6	0	1	1	0	1	1
Moroccan Throne Cup	5	3	2	0	7	4	3	1	0	0	0	1
All competitions	36	11	14	11	37	34	7	8	7	4	4	6

== Crest and shirt ==
The official crest was designed by the club's founders. It depicts the full name of the club and the year it was founded. The blue lining represents the club's location in northern Morocco.

The official home shirts are similar to the crest, colored blue and white. IR Tanger's traditional away colors change every season but are usually based on light blue with a sponsor's logo on the top.

=== Kit suppliers and shirt sponsors ===
Period	Kit manufacturer	Shirt main sponsor	Shirt sub sponsor	League sponsor
2015–2016	Bang Sports	ONDA	None	Maroc Telecom
2016–2017	Bang Sports	ONDA & UNE & APM Terminals	None	Maroc Telecom
2017–2018	Bang Sports	Renault & APM Terminals & UNE & ONDA	Tanger-Med & Valencia (juice) & RCI Finance Maroc	Maroc Telecom
2018–2019	Gloria	Renault & APM Terminals & Tanger-Med & ONDA	Valencia (juice) & STG Telecom & RCI Finance Maroc	Maroc Telecom
2019–2020	Gloria	Renault & APM Terminals & Tanger-Med & ONDA	STG Telecom & RCI Finance Maroc	None
2020–2021	Gloria	Tanger-Med	Experience Majorel	Inwi
2021–2022	Gloria	Tanger-Med	Biougnach	Inwi
2022–2025	Gloria	Tanger-Med	None	Inwi
2025–	Joma	Tanger-Med	Tanger Alliance	Inwi

== Stadium ==
The club hosted their home matches in the Stade de Marchan, a stadium with a capacity of 15,000 seats, until it was demolished. The Stade de Marchan hosted several notable matches like the one between IR Tanger vs. Wydad Casablanca during the 1989–90 season. In 2011 the club moved to the then-new Tangier Grand Stadium, which has a capacity of 75,000 (that will be increased to a maximum of 92,000 seats).

Stadium	Period
Stade de Marchan	1983–2011
Tangier Grand Stadium	2012–present

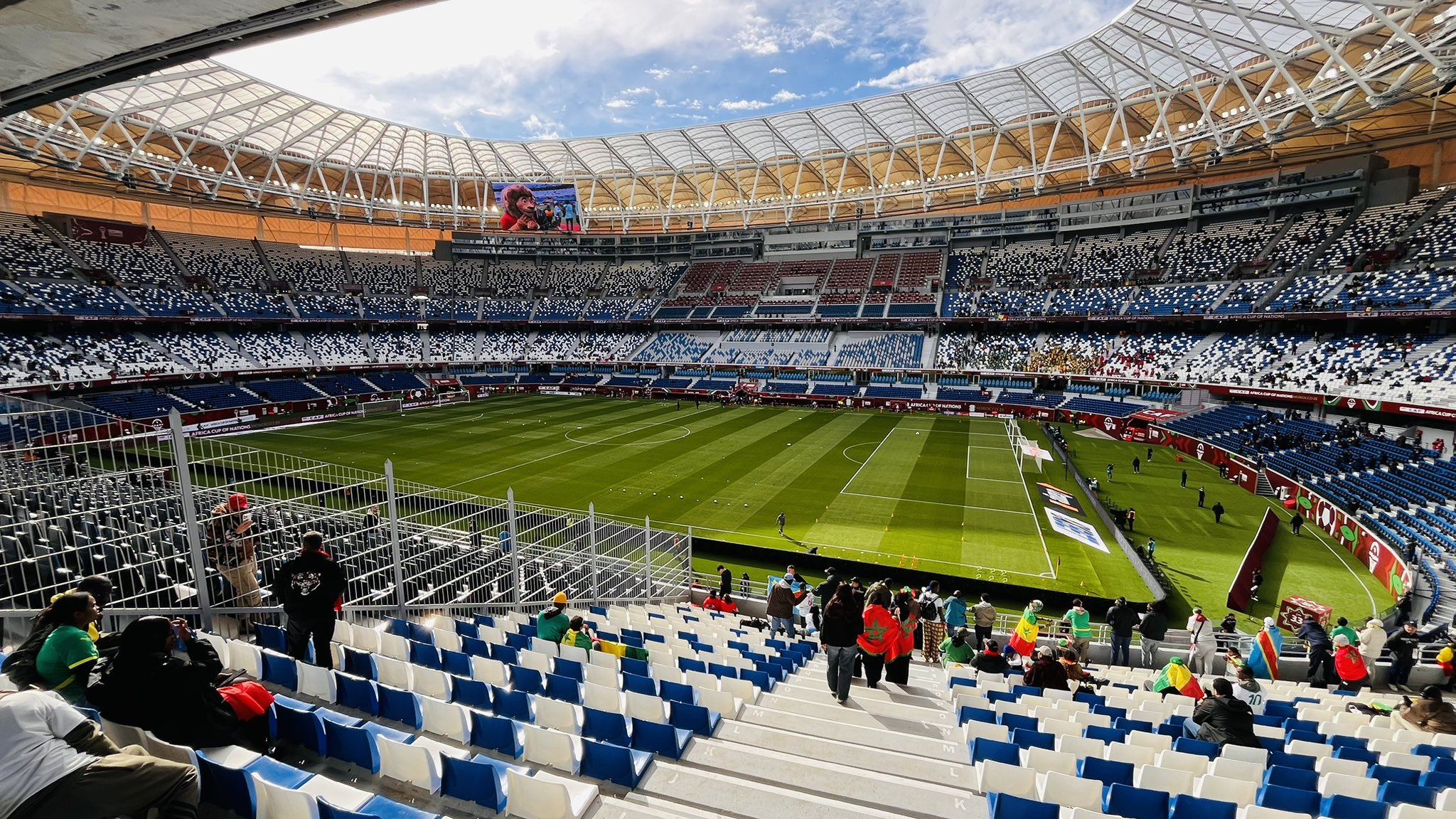
Ibn Batouta Stadium

== Season results ==
=== League and cup ===
Season	League									Top goalscorer		Throne Cup
Season	Div.	Pos.	Pl.	W	D	L	GS	GA	Pts	Name	League	Throne Cup
2015–16	1st	3rd	30	14	8	8	36	23	50	(Ivory Coast) Hervé Guy	7	Quarter-finals
2016–17	1st	5th	30	12	9	9	33	25	45	(Morocco) Ahmed Hammoudan	6	Semi-finals
2017–18	1st	1st	30	14	10	6	34	23	52	(Morocco) Mehdi Naghmi	13	Round of 16
2018–19	1st	5th	30	9	13	8	27	30	40	(Morocco) Mehdi Naghmi	9	Round of 16
2019–20	1st	14th	30	7	11	12	20	36	32	(Morocco) Sofian El Moudane	4	Quarter-finals
2020–21	1st	8th	30	10	6	14	29	36	36	(Gabon) Axel Méyé	12	Round of 16
2021–22	1st	13th	30	8	9	13	31	41	33	(Gabon) Axel Méyé	12	Round of 16
2022–23	1st	14th	30	8	5	17	23	39	29	(Morocco) Sofian El Moudane	5	Round of 16
2023–24	1st	12th	30	7	12	11	29	38	33	(Morocco) Ismail Khafi	13	Round of 32
2024–25	1st	10th	30	9	10	11	35	37	37	(Morocco) Ali El Harrak & (Morocco) Hamza El Wasti	7	Round of 32
2025–26	1st	7th	30	9	12	9	27	31	39	(Morocco) Haitam El Bahja	8	

=== African competitions ===
Year	Competition	Round	Opponent	Home	Away	Aggregate	Q
2017	CAF Confederation Cup	PR	(Niger) AS Douanes	1–0	2–1	3–1	
2017	CAF Confederation Cup	1R	(Guinea) AS Kaloum	3–0	0–1	3–1	
2017	CAF Confederation Cup	PO	(Guinea) Horoya AC	3–2	0–2	3–4	
2018–19	CAF Champions League	PR	(Chad) Elect-Sport FC	1–0	0–0	1–0	
2018–19	CAF Champions League	1R	(Algeria) JS Saoura	1–0	0–2	1–2	
2018–19	CAF Confederation Cup	PO	(Egypt) Zamalek SC	0–0	1–3	1–3	

=== Arab competition ===
Year	Competition	Round	Opponent	Score	Position	Q
2019–20	Arab Club Champions Cup	PR	(Bahrain) Riffa SC	0–2	2nd	
2019–20	Arab Club Champions Cup	PR	(Iraq) Al-Zawraa SC	3–0	2nd	
2019–20	Arab Club Champions Cup	PR	(Somalia) Horseed FC	1–6	2nd	

Notes

- PR: Preliminary round
- 1R: First round
- PO: Play-off round

== Honours ==
Type	Competition	Titles	Winning Seasons	Runners-up
Domestic	Botola Pro	1	2017–18	1989–90
Domestic	Botola 2	3	1961–62, 2000–01, 2014–15	1986–87, 1996–97,

== Players ==
=== Current squad ===
As of 10 October 2026

Note: Flags indicate national team as defined under FIFA eligibility rules; some limited exceptions apply. Players may hold more than one non-FIFA nationality.

No.	Pos.	Nation	Player
2	DF	MAR	Reda El Meliani
4	DF	MAR	Mohamed Saoud (captain)
6	DF	MAR	Bilal El Ouadghiri
7	FW	MAR	Younes Najari
8	MF	BOT	Gape Mohutsiwa
10	MF	FRA	Mohamed El Arouch
12	GK	TOG	Malcolm Barcola
13	GK	MAR	Aymane Douieb
15	DF	MAR	Achraf Laâziri
16	FW	MAR	Akram Tali
17	FW	MAR	Abdelhamid Maâli
18	MF	NED	Soufyan Ahannach
20	MF	MAR	Ennaama El Bellali
21	MF	MAR	Hamza El Moudene
22	DF	MAR	Zakaria Kiani

No.	Pos.	Nation	Player
23	DF	MAR	Anass Lamrabat
24	DF	ESP	Akram El Wahabi
25	GK	MAR	Ahmed Azmi
27	DF	MAR	Saad Ait Khorsa
29	MF	SEN	Babacar Sarr
31	FW	SEN	Ibrahima Dieng
34	MF	MAR	Mohamed El Guartit
36	DF	MAR	Saad Karouat
48	MF	MAR	Achraf El Quaraoui
61	GK	MAR	Badreddine Abyir
67	FW	ENG	Haytham Bakhlakh
77	FW	MAR	Ousama Siddiki
98	DF	MAR	Yassine Karmadi
99	FW	GER	Senad Jarović

=== Former players ===
- (Algeria) Abdellah El Moudene
- (Algeria) Gaya Merbah
- (Algeria) Walid Bencherifa
- (Burkina Faso) Bassirou Compaoré
- (Belgium) Zakaria Bakkali
- (Bosnia and Herzegovina) Enes Šipović
- (Brazil) Hugo Almeida
- (Republic of the Congo) Dylan Saint-Louis
- (Republic of the Congo) Ismaël Ankobo
- (Ivory Coast) Hervé Guy
- (Ivory Coast) Jacques N'da
- (Ivory Coast) Siriki Sanogo
- (Cameroon) Alexis Enam
- (Cameroon) Brice Owona
- (Democratic Republic of the Congo) Mukoko Batezadio
- (Croatia) Zoran Plazonić
- (Equatorial Guinea) Pablo Ganet
- (France) Pape Paye
- (Gabon) Abdou Atchabao
- (Gabon) Axel Méyé
- (Gabon) Stévy Nzambé
- (Libya) Zakaria Alharaish
- (Morocco) Abdelatif Noussir
- (Morocco) Abdellatif Akhrif
- (Morocco) Abdelfettah Boukhriss
- (Morocco) Abdelghani Mouaoui
- (Morocco) Abdelhakim Aklidou
- (Morocco) Abdelkabir El Ouadi
- (Morocco) Abdessamad Rafik
- (Morocco) Adil Chihi
- (Morocco) Adil Lamrabet
- (Morocco) Ahmad Hamoudan
- (Morocco) Ahmed Mohamadina
- (Morocco) Ahmed Reda Tagnaouti
- (Morocco) Aissa Sioudi
- (Morocco) Anas El Asbahi
- (Morocco) Atik Chihab
- (Morocco) Ayoub El Khaliqi
- (Morocco) Badr Gaddarine
- (Morocco) Badr Zaki Nacer
- (Morocco) Badreddine Benachour
- (Morocco) Benaissa Benamar
- (Morocco) Bilal Danguir
- (Morocco) Driss El Mrabet
- (Morocco) Faouzi Abdelghani
- (Morocco) Habib Allah Dahmani
- (Morocco) Hamid Janina
- (Morocco) Hamdi Laachir
- (Morocco) Hamza El Wasti
- (Morocco) Hafid Abdessadek
- (Morocco) Hicham El Mejhed
- (Morocco) Hicham Misbah
- (Morocco) Houssin Rajallah
- (Morocco) Ibrahim Bezghoudi
- (Morocco) Ismail Belmaalem
- (Morocco) Issam Badda
- (Morocco) Ismail Khafi
- (Morocco) Issam Erraki
- (Morocco) Jalal Daoudi
- (Morocco) Khairallah Abdelkbir
- (Morocco) Khalid Fouhami
- (Morocco) Lahcen Abrami
- (Morocco) Mehdi Naghmi
- (Morocco) Mohamed Amsif
- (Morocco) Mohamed Bouldini
- (Morocco) Mohamed Chibi
- (Morocco) Mohamed Fouzair
- (Morocco) Mohamed Madihi
- (Morocco) Mohamed Souboul
- (Morocco) Mohammed Ali Bemammer
- (Morocco) Mohsine Moutouali
- (Morocco) Mouloud Moudakkar
- (Morocco) Nabil Jaadi
- (Morocco) Noussair El Maimouni
- (Morocco) Omar Arjoune
- (Morocco) Omar Najdi
- (Morocco) Rachid Housni
- (Morocco) Reda Jaadi
- (Morocco) Sofian El Moudane
- (Morocco) Soufian Echaraf
- (Morocco) Soufian El Hassnaoui
- (Morocco) Talal El Karkouri
- (Morocco) Youcef Sekour
- (Morocco) Youssef Benali
- (Morocco) Zouhair Laaroubi
- (Mali) Abdoulaye Demba
- (Mali) Abdoulaye Diarra
- (Mauritania) Ismaël Diakité
- (Portugal) Carlos Gomes*
- (Portugal) Carlos Fortes
- (Senegal) Ousmane Diop
- (Senegal) Ousseynou Thioune

== Personnel ==
=== Current technical staff ===
Position	Name
First team head coach	(Algeria) Abdelhak Benchikha
Assistant coach	(France) Serge Romano
Assistant coach	(Morocco) Youssef Sekour
Fitness coach	(Morocco) Mouchriq Abdelhakim
Goalkeeping coach	(Morocco) Mohammed Bestara
Performance analyst	(France) Antoine Giacomoni
Sports Psychologist	(Morocco) Ali Ataoui
Club doctor	(Morocco) Marouan Afkir
Sports Nurse	(Morocco) Abdelmonhem Nafie
Sports Masseur	(Morocco) Mohamed Didi
Physiotherapist	(Morocco) Saber Khamal
Hope's team coach	(France) David Vandenbossche
Hope's team assistant coach	(Morocco) Ahmed Salah
Hope's Team Fitness coach	(Morocco) Hamza Raiss El Fenni

=== Football Sport Management ===
Position	Staff
Director of football	(France) Julien Bangala
Football coordinator	(Morocco) Mohamed Sabek
Head of Scouting	(Morocco) Ali El Omari

=== Managers ===
- (Brazil) Jorvan Vieira (1984–86)
- (Morocco) Mohamed Baltham (1986–87)
- (Morocco) Abdelkhalek Louzani (1987–88)
- (Germany) Bob Schneider (1988–89)
- (Portugal) Mário Ribeiro Nunes (1989–91)
- (Morocco) Abderrahim El Houazer (1991)
- (Algeria) Mahieddine Khalef (1991–93)
- (Algeria) Abdellah Hammouni (1993–94)
- (Brazil) Jorvan Vieira (1993–94)
- (Morocco) Abdelghani Bennaciri (1994–95)
- (Morocco) Aziz El Amri (1996–97)
- (Morocco) Omar Rais (2000–01)
- (Morocco) Aziz El Amri (2001–02)
- (Morocco) Abdelhadi Sektioui (2002–03)
- (Morocco) Hassan Ajenoui (2003)
- (Morocco) Driss El Mrabet (2003–04)
- (Morocco) Rachid Taoussi (2004)
- (Spain) Ricardo Serna (2004–05)
- (Morocco) Hamadi Hamidouch (2005)
- (Morocco) Abdelhadi Sektioui (2005–06)
- (Switzerland) Raoul Savoy (2006)
- (Morocco) Aziz El Khayati (2006–07)
- (Morocco) Hassan Ajenoui (2007)
- (Morocco) Abderrazak Khairi (2007–08)
- (Morocco) Omar Rais (Oct 2008– )
- (Morocco) Mohamed Amine Benhachem (2009)
- (Morocco) Mohamed Bentaleb (–Mar 2010)
- (Morocco) Abdelmalek Ajbaten (Mar– 2010)
- (Morocco) Najib Hannouni (–Sep 2010)
- (Morocco) Said El Khider (Sep–Dec 2010)
- (Morocco) Omar Rais (Dec 2010– )
- (Morocco) Hassan Regragui (Apr–Jun 2012)
- (Morocco) Youssef Fertout (Jul–Nov 2012)
- (Morocco) Hicham Rok (–Jan 2013)
- (Morocco) Abdelkader Youmir (Jan–Jun 2013)
- (Morocco) Mohamed Said Zekri (Jul–Nov 2013)
- (Morocco) Omar Rais (Nov 2013–Jun 2014)
- (Morocco) Mohamed Amine Benhachem (Jun 2014–May 2015)
- (Algeria) Abdelhak Benchikha (Jun 2015–Apr 2017)
- (Morocco) Mohamed Sabek (Apr 2017)
- (Morocco) Bachir Bouita (Apr–May 2017)
- (Morocco) Ezzaki Badou (May–Nov 2017)
- (Morocco) Driss El Mrabet (Nov 2017–Sep 2018)
- (Tunisia) Ahmad Al-Ajlani (Sep–Dec 2018)
- (Morocco) Abdelouahed Benkacem (Dec–Jun 2019)
- (Algeria) Nabil Neghiz (Jun 2019–Oct 2019)
- (Morocco) Abdelouahed Benkacem (Oct–Nov 2019)
- (Morocco) Hicham Dmiai (Nov 2019–Jan 2020)
- (Spain) Juan Pedro Benali (Jan–Oct 2020)
- (Morocco) Driss El Mrabet (Nov 2020–Aug 2021)
- (France) Bernard Casoni (Aug–Nov 2021)
- (Morocco) Jaafar R'kyek (Nov 2021)
- (Argentina) Miguel Ángel Gamondi (Nov 2021–Apr 2022)
- (Spain) Juan Pedro Benali (Apr–Jul 2022)
- (Morocco) Ezzaki Badou (Jul–Oct 2022)
- (Morocco) Hakim Daoudi (Oct 2022–Jan 2023)
- (Morocco) Hilal Et-tair (Jan–Sep 2023)
- (Morocco) Omar Najhi (Sep 2023–Jan 2024)
- (Morocco) Hilal Et-tair (Jan 2024–Nov 2025)
- (Spain) Pepe Mel (Dec 2025–Mar 2026)
- (Algeria) Abdelhak Benchikha (Mar 2026–)

== Management ==
=== Board of directors ===
Position	Name
President	Nassrallah El Guartit
Executive Office Members	Rachid El Hassani; Anass El Ouassini; Issam Talibi; Abdellah El Mrabet Dajidi; Noureddine Changachi; Rabie Jaabak; Samir Temlali; Zakaria Hachoumi; Yassine Temsamani; Omar Al Abbas

=== Presidents ===
- Abdessalam Aghziel (1983–84)
- Amine Assoufi
- Abdeslam Arbaine (~1987~)
- Hassan Bouhrize (~1991~)
- Mohammed Zbakh
- Mohamed Larbi Bouras (2002–04)
- Abdelhak Bakhat (2009)
- Adil Defouf (–2012)
- Abdelhamid Aberchane (2013–21)
- Mohamed Ahagan (2021–22)
- Mohammed Cherkaoui (2023–24)
- Nassrallah El Guartit (2024–)

== Partnerships ==
- (Algeria) CR Belouizdad (2017)
- (Spain) RCD Espanyol (2018)
- (Spain) CD Leganés (2019)
- (France) Olympique Lyonnais (2025)

== See also ==
- UD España
- EHA Tánger
