= Jacques N'da =

Ivorian footballer

Anderson Yoboue
Personal information
- Full name: Jacques Anderson Yoboue N'da
- Date of birth: 19 April 1984 (age 42)
- Place of birth: Abidjan, Ivory Coast
- Height: 1.84 m (6 ft 1/2 in)
- Position: Striker

Team information
- Current team: US Témara
- Number: 43

Senior career*
Years	Team	Apps	(Gls)
2007–2008	IR Tanger	12	(5)
2009	FC AK	8	(3)
2009	Bidvest Wits	2	(0)
2009	Black Aces	3	(0)
2010–present	US Témara		

International career
2006–2007	Ivory Coast U-23	5	(0)
- * Club domestic league appearances and goals

Jacques Anderson Yoboue N'da (born 19 April 1984) is an Ivorian footballer. He plays for US Témara.

== Career ==
N'da played in his first professional season for IR Tanger and joined FC Azziz Kara in January 2009. He stayed with FC AK until July 2009, then joined Bidvest Wits. He was released from Bidvest Wits in September and signed on 11 September 2009 with Mpumalanga Black Aces F.C. After four months in the ABSA Premiership for Mpumalanga Black Aces F.C. he returned in January 2010 to Morocco and signed with US Témara.
