= Zoran Plazonić =

Croatian footballer (born 1989)

Personal information
- Full name: Zoran Plazonić
- Date of birth: 1 February 1989 (age 37)
- Place of birth: Split, Croatia
- Height: 1.80 m (5 ft 11 in)
- Position: Midfielder

Youth career
- –2007: Hajduk Split

Senior career*
Years	Team	Apps	(Gls)
2007–2008	Hajduk Split	1	(0)
2007–2008	→ Mosor (loan)	26	(1)
2008–2010	Mosor	36	(3)
2010–2011	Hrvatski Dragovoljac	16	(0)
2011–2013	Hajduk Split	7	(0)
2011–2012	→ Primorac 1929 (loan)	38	(12)
2013–2015	Široki Brijeg	39	(2)
2015–2016	IR de Tanger	6	(0)
2016	Šibenik	12	(2)
2016–2017	Široki Brijeg	10	(0)
2017–2018	Imotski		
2018–2020	Vestri	50	(8)
2021	Njarðvík	13	(1)
2022	Reynir Sandgerði	18	(1)
- * Club domestic league appearances and goals as of 19 November 2022

Zoran Plazonić (born 1 February 1989) is a Croatian football midfielder who most recently played for Iceland third-tier side Reynir Sandgerði. He has also played for Vestri.
