= Houssin Rajallah =

Moroccan footballer

Personal information
- Full name: Houssin Rajallah
- Date of birth: January 25, 1982 (age 44)
- Place of birth: Morocco
- Height: 1.69 m (5 ft 7 in)
- Position: Defender

Team information
- Current team: Raja Casablanca

Senior career*
Years	Team	Apps	(Gls)
?–2007	Nouacer		
2007–2008	Raja Casablanca		
2008–	Chabab Mohammédia		
- * Club domestic league appearances and goals as of 02:55, 18 August 2009 (UTC)

Houssin Rajallah (born 25 January 1982) is a Moroccan football defender who plays for Chabab Mohammédia.

Rajallah previously played for Raja Casablanca.
