= Ngombe Mbengue =

Cameroonian footballer (born 1993)

Personal information
- Full name: Rudolph Danger Ngombe Mbengue
- Date of birth: 1 April 1993 (age 33)
- Place of birth: Cameroon
- Height: 1.84 m (6 ft 0 in)
- Position: Forward

Team information
- Current team: Khosilot Farkhor
- Number: 70

Youth career
- Botafogo

Senior career*
Years	Team	Apps	(Gls)
2015–2016	New Star de Douala		
2016–2018	OC Khourigba	31	(8)
2018	Kawkab Marrakech	8	(0)
2018–2021	Al-Jahra		
2021	Al-Suwaiq		
2021–2023	Naft Al-Basra		
2023	Duhok		
2024	Naft Al-Basra		
2024–2025	Naft Al-Basra		
2025–	Khosilot Farkhor	19	(7)
- * Club domestic league appearances and goals as of 20 November 2025

Ngombe Mbengue (born April 6, 1993) is a Cameroonian professional footballer who plays as a forward for the Tajikistan Higher League club Khosilot Farkhor.

== Career ==
Mbengue started playing with Botafogo and then moved to New Star de Douala. in August 2016 he signed a four-year contract with OC Khourigba, where he played professionally in Morocco. In January 2018, he moved to Kawkab Marrakech, and in June 2018 he moved to the Kuwait Premier League, where he signed a contract with Al-Jahra. In January 2021, Mbengue moved to the Oman Professional League, signing with Al-Suwaiq.

In September 2021, Mbengue moved to play in the Iraqi Premier League, where he signed a one-year contract with Naft Al-Basra, and in August 2022 his contract was renewed for an additional year.
