= Ibrahima Diomandé =

Ivorian footballer (born 1969)

Personal information
- Date of birth: 28 October 1969 (age 57)
- Place of birth: Issia, Ivory Coast
- Position: Defender

International career
Years	Team	Apps	(Gls)
1995–1999	Ivory Coast	23	(1)

Ibrahima Diomandé (born 28 October 1969) is an Ivorian footballer. He played in 23 matches for the Ivory Coast national football team from 1995 to 1999. He was also named in Ivory Coast's squad for the 1998 African Cup of Nations tournament.
