= Marouane Fakhr =

Moroccan footballer

Personal information
- Full name: Marouane Fakhr
- Date of birth: 11 February 1989 (age 37)
- Place of birth: Casablanca, Morocco
- Height: 1.82 m (6 ft 0 in)
- Position: Goalkeeper

Team information
- Current team: RCA Zemamra
- Number: 12

Youth career
- –2012: AS FAR
- 2012–2013: Fath US

Senior career*
Years	Team	Apps	(Gls)
2013–2015	US Témara		
2015–2016	IR Tanger	16	(0)
2016–2017	CA Khénifra	28	(0)
2017–2018	OC Khouribga	25	(0)
2018–2019	Abha Club		
2019–2020	Al-Ansar FC		
2020–2022	MC Oujda	25	(0)
2022–2024	Raja CA	10	(0)
2024–	RCA Zemamra	8	(0)
- * Club domestic league appearances and goals as of 18 May 2024

Marouane Fakhr (Arabic: مروان فخر; born 11 February 1989) is a Moroccan professional footballer who plays as a goalkeeper for Botola side RCA Zemamra.

== Early life ==
Marouane Fakhr was born on 11 February 1989 in Casablanca. He joined the AS FAR training center as a youngster, then that of Fath Union Sports in 2012.

== Career ==
In 2013, he began his professional career by signing at US Temara, which then played for Botola 2.

During the 2015–16 season, he made his debut in Botola with Ittihad Tanger. A season later, he joined CA Khénifra then OC Khouribga.

On November 13, 2020, after playing two years in Saudi Arabia, he signed a three-year contract at Mouloudia Oujda.

On January 24, 2022, Raja Club Athletic announced the recruitment of Marouane Fakhr for six months after Anas Zniti was injured and Gaya Merbah was disallowed from taking part in the 2021-22 Champions League after he played the first round with his previous club. In the summer, he renewed his contract with the club for two more seasons.
