= Badr Zaki Nacer =

Moroccan footballer

Personal information
- Date of birth: 16 April 1988 (age 38)
- Place of birth: Marrakesh, Morocco
- Position: Midfielder

Team information
- Current team: Union Aït Melloul

Youth career
- ?–2007: Kawkab Marrakech

Senior career*
Years	Team	Apps	(Gls)
2007–2009	Kawkab Marrakech	15	(0)
2009–2012	JS Massira		
2012–2014	O Marrakech		
2014–2015	IR Tanger		(4)
2015–	U Aït Melloul		
- * Club domestic league appearances and goals as of 22 December 2020

Badr Zaki Nacer (born 16 April 1988) is a Moroccan footballer who plays as a midfielder for Union Aït Melloul.
