= Mohamed Ramzi =

Sri Lankan cricketer (born 1982)

Personal information
- Full name: Nilamdeen Mohamed Ramzi
- Born: 23 March 1982 (age 44) (Note: His date of birth is recorded as 22 March on Cricinfo and 23 March on CricketArchive)
- Source: Cricinfo, 22 April 2021

Mohamed Ramzi (born 23 March 1982) is a Sri Lankan former cricketer. He played in 33 first-class and 23 List A matches between 2000/01 and 2006/07. He made his Twenty20 debut on 17 August 2004, for Kurunegala Youth Cricket Club in the 2004 SLC Twenty20 Tournament.
