= Said Zaidi =

Moroccan footballer

Personal information
- Full name: Said Zaidi
- Date of birth: January 10, 1986 (age 40)
- Place of birth: Casablanca, Morocco
- Height: 1.75 m (5 ft 9 in)
- Position: Defender

Team information
- Current team: CR Al Hoceima

Youth career
- Wydad Casablanca

Senior career*
Years	Team	Apps	(Gls)
2006–2011	Wydad Casablanca	89	(1)
2011–	CR Al Hoceima	65	(1)
- * Club domestic league appearances and goals as of April 4, 2014

Said Zaidi (born 10 January 1986 in Casablanca) is a Moroccan footballer, who is currently attached to Chabab Rif Al Hoceima.
