= Marchan Stadium =

Football stadium in Tangier, Morocco

Coordinates: 35°47′22″N 5°49′20″W

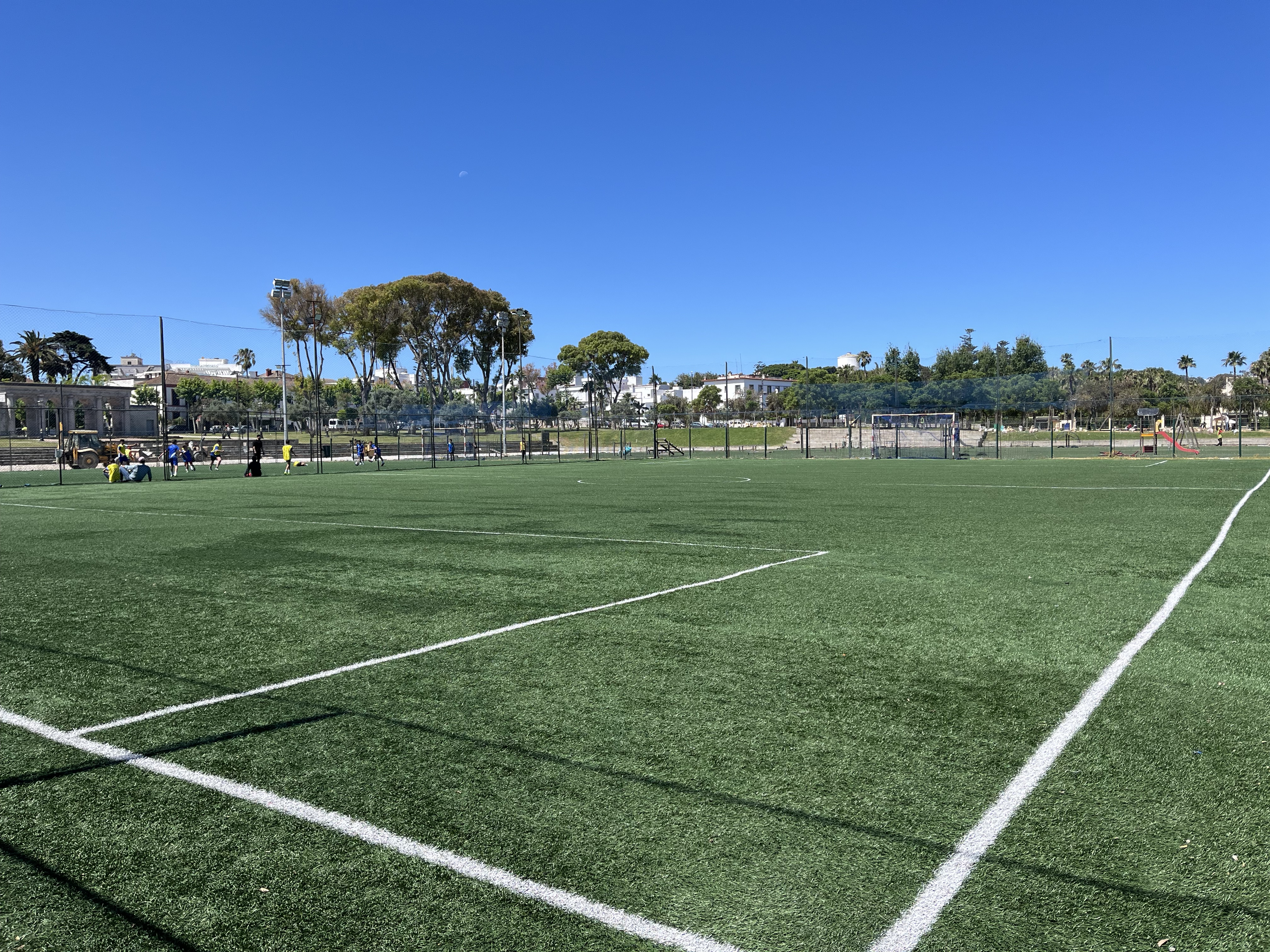
Stade de Marchan after redevelopment, 2025

Stade de Marchan was a multi-use stadium in Tangier, Morocco. It was used mostly for football matches and used to be the home ground of IR Tanger. The stadium held 14,000 people. It was however replaced by Stade de Tanger after the latter's construction was completed.

== History ==
The Stade de Marshan was inaugurated in 1939 by the Spanish colonial authorities under the name Stade Municipal. Among the first football clubs to play matches at the stadium during the Spanish colonization of Morocco were Escuela Hispano Árabe, Unión Tangerina F.C., Athletic Club de Tánger, Racing Club de Tánger, and ASF Tanger, among others.

The stadium later became the home ground of Al-Aksa Sporting Club, also known as Moghreb Al-Aksa de Tanger or simply Moghreb de Tanger, and later of IR Tanger. However, since the inauguration of the new stadium in Tangier, IR Tanger no longer plays its matches at Stade de Marshan.

In 2016, the stadium underwent a major transformation. The entire structure was demolished, with the exception of the main entrance, which was preserved as a vestige of the original site. As part of the Tanger Métropole urban development project, the city of Tangier redeveloped the area into two football pitches and a children's park.

== See also ==
- Marshan Palace, Tangier
