= Faouzi Abdelghani =

Moroccan footballer

Personal information
- Full name: Mohamed Abdelghani Faouzi
- Date of birth: July 13, 1985 (age 41)
- Place of birth: El Kelaa des Sraghna, Morocco
- Height: 1.70 m (5 ft 7 in)
- Position: Winger

Youth career
- Wydad Casablanca

Senior career*
Years	Team	Apps	(Gls)
2005–2010	Wydad Casablanca		
- → JS Massira (loan)
2010–2012	Vitória Guimarães	28	(3)
2012	→ Ittihad (loan)	5	(0)
2012–2014	Ittihad	2	(0)
2013–2014	→ Al Khor (loan)	9	(0)
2014–2015	Moghreb Tétouan	18	(3)
2015	Ittihad Tanger	4	(0)
2016	Olympique Khouribga	10	(1)
2016–2018	Hassania Agadir	44	(7)
2018–2019	CR Al Hoceima	26	(2)
2019	Raja Beni Mellal		
2019–2021	RAC Casablanca		
- * Club domestic league appearances and goals as of 21:04, 4 February 2020 (UTC)

Mohamed Abdelghani Faouzi (born July 13, 1985) is a Moroccan former professional footballer who played as a winger.

== Career ==
Faouzi started playing football on the streets of his village, Al Attaouia (El Kelaa des Sraghna). There, he was spotted by scouts from Wydad Casablanca who brought him to the club. During his time with Wydad, he was loaned out to JS Massira.

On January 31, 2012, Faouzi was loaned out by Vitória to Saudi Arabian club Ittihad FC for six months with a buy option. On February 7, he made his debut for Ittihad as a starter in a league match against Al-Raed. The player shines as Alittihad has been qualified to the quarter final of Asian Champions League. He scored 3 goals and made 3 Assists and 2 penalties for his team in 7 matches to be the best player in the team during the Asian Champions League.
