= Youssef Sekour =

Moroccan professional footballer (born 1988)

Personal information
- Full name: Youssef Sekour
- Date of birth: 27 February 1988 (age 38)
- Place of birth: Istres, France
- Height: 1.88 m (6 ft 2 in)
- Position: Midfielder

Youth career
- 2003–2005: Bordeaux

Senior career*
Years	Team	Apps	(Gls)
2005–2008	Bordeaux (B team)	6	(2)
2007–2008	→ Nantes (loan)	6	(2)
2008–2010	Sedan	17	(1)
2010–2011	Lierse	5	(0)
2011–2012	Lillestrøm	0	(0)
2012–2013	Diósgyőr	11	(1)
2012–2013	→ Pápa (loan)	10	(1)
2013–2014	Pápa	22	(0)
2013–2015	Fath Union Sport	21	(6)
2016–2017	IR Tanger	31	(5)
2017–2018	Umm Salal	9	(1)
2018	Olympique Khouribga	21	(3)
2019–2020	Al-Yarmouk		

International career
2007	Morocco U-20	1	(0)
- * Club domestic league appearances and goals as of 25 February 2019

Youssef Sekour (born 27 February 1988) is a professional footballer who last played as a midfielder for Olympique Khouribga. Born in France, he represented Morocco at under-20 international level.

== Career ==
=== Club career ===
Sekour joined Kuwaiti club Al-Yarmouk in August 2019. His contract was terminated in May 2020.
