= Alexis Enam =

Cameroonian footballer

Alexis Mondomo
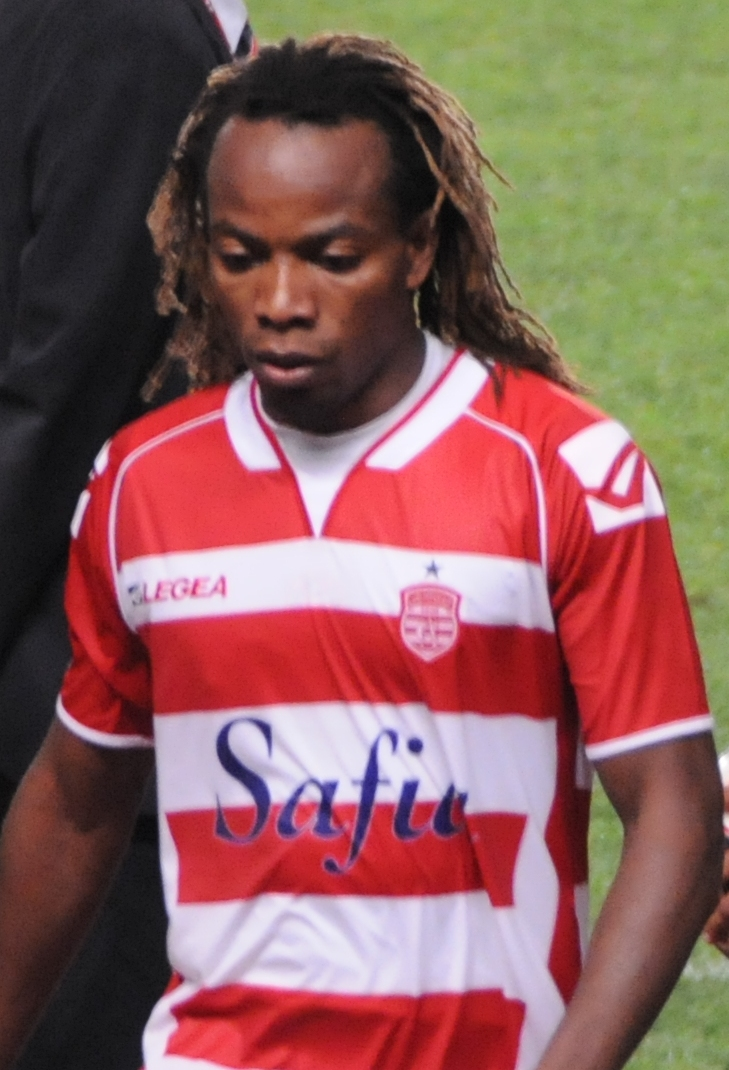

Personal information
- Full name: Alexis Enam Mondomo
- Date of birth: November 25, 1986 (age 39)
- Place of birth: Ambam, Cameroon
- Height: 1.81 m (5 ft 11 in)
- Position: Midfielder

Senior career*
Years	Team	Apps	(Gls)
2003	Bamenda	24	(5)
2004	Les Astres	40	(4)
2005–2007	Al-Ittihad	24	(3)
2007–2011	Club Africain	95	(8)
2012–2013	Zamalek SC	15	(3)
2013–2015	Al Raed	25	(0)
2015–2016	IR Tanger	26	(0)
- Club Africain

International career^{‡}
2007	Cameroon	9	(0)
- * Club domestic league appearances and goals as of November 28, 2015 ‡ National team caps and goals as of 14:15, 8 October 2008 (UTC)

Alexis Enam Mendomo (born November 25, 1986) is a Cameroonian football midfielder.

== Career highlights ==
In Tunisia with Club Africain

- Tunisian Champion 2008 Winner
- North African Cup 2008 Winner
- North African Cup 2010 Winner
- Tunisian League 2009 Vice-Champion
- Tunisian League 2010 Vice-Champion
- CAF Cup 2011 Finalist

In Libya with Ittihad Tripolis

- Libyan Championship 2007
- Libyan Championship 2006
- Libyan Super Cup in 2006
