= Ayoub El Khaliqi =

Moroccan footballer

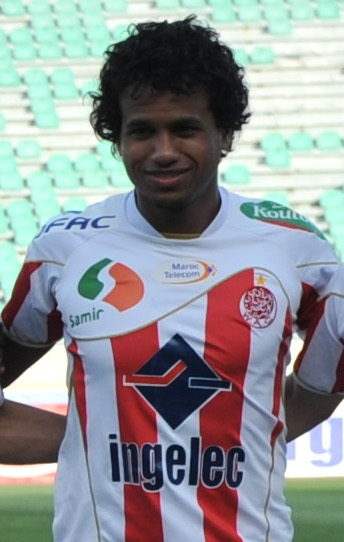
- El Khaliqi with Wydad Casablanca in 2012

Personal information
- Date of birth: 11 September 1986 (age 40)
- Place of birth: Rabat, Morocco
- Height: 1.82 m (6 ft 0 in)
- Position: Right-back

Youth career
- FUS Rabat

Senior career*
Years	Team	Apps	(Gls)
2007–2011	FUS Rabat		
2011–2014	Wydad Casablanca	35	(4)
2014–2016	FAR Rabat	19	(0)
2016–2019	IR Tanger	73	(4)

International career
2011–2014	Morocco	10	(1)
- * Club domestic league appearances and goals

Ayoub El Khaliqi (born 11 September 1986) is a Moroccan former professional footballer who played as a right-back. He made ten appearances for the Morocco national team and scored once.

== Honours ==
FUS Rabat

- GNF 2: 2008–09
- CAF Confederation Cup: 2010
- Moroccan Throne Cup: 2010

Ittihad Tanger

- Botola: 2017–18

Individual

- CAF Team of the Year: 2011
