= Ahmed Mohamadina =

Moroccan footballer

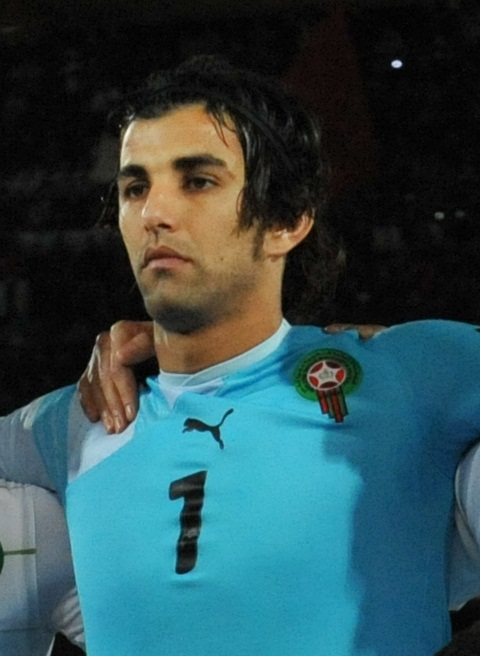
- Ahmed Mohamadina with Morocco before a friendly, February 2011.

Personal information
- Date of birth: 10 March 1984 (age 42)
- Place of birth: Khemisset, Morocco
- Height: 1.95 m (6 ft 5 in)
- Position: Goalkeeper

Senior career*
Years	Team	Apps	(Gls)
2006–2009	Ittihad Khemisset	?	(0)
2009–2012	Olympique Khouribga	57	(0)
2012–2014	Nahdat Berkane	36	(0)
2014–2015	Difaâ El Jadida	16	(0)
2016	IR Tanger	11	(0)

International career^{‡}
2011–	Morocco	2	(0)
- * Club domestic league appearances and goals as of 24 April 2017 ‡ National team caps and goals as of 24 November 2011

Ahmed Mohamadina (born 10 March 1984, in Khemisset) is a Moroccan goalkeeper who plays for IR Tanger and Morocco's national football team.
