= Adil Lamrabet =

Moroccan footballer

Adil Lamrabat
Personal information
- Full name: Adil Lamrabat
- Date of birth: January 9, 1979 (age 47)
- Place of birth: Tétouan, Morocco
- Position: Midfielder

Youth career
- ?–1997: Moghreb Tétouan

Senior career*
Years	Team	Apps	(Gls)
- Moghreb Tétouan
- Raja Al Hoceima
- Ittihad Khemisset
2014–2016	IR Tanger	21	(1)
- * Club domestic league appearances and goals as of April 16, 2009 ‡ National team caps and goals as of October 17, 2008

Adil Lamrabet, also known as Adil Lamrabat, is a Moroccan footballer. He usually plays as midfielder. Lamrabat is currently attached to IR Tanger.
