= Brice Owona =

Cameroonian footballer

Personal information
- Full name: Brice Owona
- Date of birth: 4 March 1989 (age 37)
- Place of birth: Yaoundé, Cameroon
- Height: 1.80 m (5 ft 11 in)
- Positions: Midfielder; striker

Team information
- Current team: APEJES

Youth career
- 2002–2005: AS Fortuna Yaoundé

Senior career*
Years	Team	Apps	(Gls)
2005–2009	Cotonsport Garoua	20	(7)
2010–2012	FC St. Gallen	25	(5)
2012	GC Biaschesi	2	(0)
2013–2015	Union Douala		
2015–2016	IR Tanger	12	(1)
2016–2017	APEJES		
2017–2019	Eding Sport		
2019–	APEJES		

International career
2009	Cameroon U20	3	(0)
- * Club domestic league appearances and goals

Brice Owona (born 4 March 1989 in Yaoundé) is a professional Cameroonian footballer currently playing for APEJES.

== Club career ==
Owona began his career in January 2002 for AS Fortuna Yaoundé and was in summer 2005 scouted by Cotonsport Garoua. On 12 February 2010 FC St. Gallen has committed the midfielder of Cotonsport Garoua, the offensive player signed a contract until 2012 with FC St. Gallen. On the same day he made his debut for the Ostschweizer club in a friendly game against the Austrian club FC Dornbirn 1913.

== International career ==
He is former member of the Cameroon national under-20 football team and played with the team the 2009 FIFA U-20 World Cup.
