= Abdessamad Rafik =

Moroccan footballer

Personal information
- Full name: Abdessamad Rafik
- Date of birth: 8 April 1982 (age 44)
- Place of birth: Khouribga, Morocco
- Height: 1.82 m (6 ft 0 in)
- Position: Winger

Senior career*
Years	Team	Apps	(Gls)
2005–2006	Khouribga	?	(?)
2006–2009	Wydad Casablanca	82	(17)
2009–2010	Al Wahda	14	(4)
2010–2012	Difaâ El Jadidi	25	(4)
2012–2014	Olympique Safi	78	(12)
2014–2015	Moghreb Tetouan	?	(2)
2015–2016	IR Tanger	22	(6)
2016–2017	Hassania Agadir	13	(0)

International career^{‡}
2009	Morocco	2	(0)
2012–2017	Morocco local	9	(2)
- * Club domestic league appearances and goals as of 12 August 2020 ‡ National team caps and goals as of 12 August 2020

Abdessamad Rafik (Arabic: عبد الصمد رفيق; born 8 April 1982 in Khouribga) is a Moroccan former footballer.

His former clubs are Wydad Casablanca and Olympique Khouribga.
