= Abdelfettah Boukhriss =

Moroccan footballer

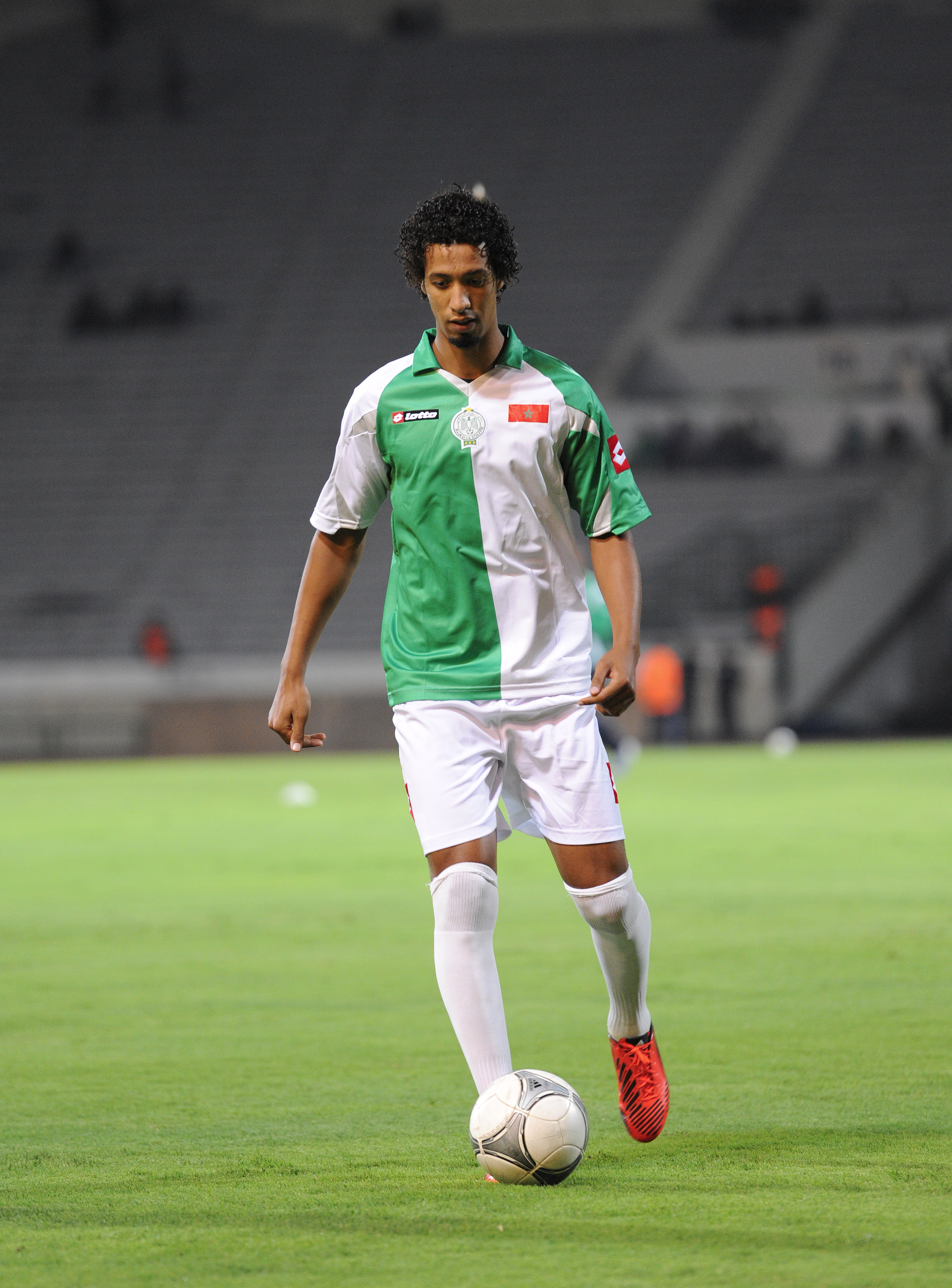

Personal information
- Full name: Abdelfettah Boukhriss
- Date of birth: 22 October 1986 (age 40)
- Place of birth: Rabat, Morocco
- Height: 1.88 m (6 ft 2 in)
- Position: Centre-back

Senior career*
Years	Team	Apps	(Gls)
2004–2011	FUS de Rabat	12	(0)
2010–2012	Standard Liège	1	(0)
2011–2012	→ FUS de Rabat (loan)	24	(3)
2012–2013	Raja Casablanca	18	(1)
2013–2014	Al Wasl	6	(0)
2014–2015	FUS de Rabat	35	(1)
2015–2016	IR Tanger	21	(1)
2016–2017	Olympic Safi	7	(0)
2017	Olympique Club de Khouribga	4	(0)

International career^{‡}
2011–2012	Morocco	3	(0)
- * Club domestic league appearances and goals as of 23 July 2016 ‡ National team caps and goals as of 20 March 2016

Abdelfettah Boukhriss (born 22 October 1986) is a Moroccan footballer who plays as a centre-back for IR Tanger.

== Club career ==
In 2004, he signed for FUS de Rabat. He has spent most of his career at the club. However, for a short period, he moved to Belgian Pro League side Standard Liège, where he managed one appearance, though he did play as they won the 2011 Belgian Cup Final.

== International career ==
In 2011, he made his debut for the Morocco national football team.

== Honours ==
Standard Liège

- Belgian Cup: 2010–11
