= Enes Sipović =

Bosnian footballer (born 1990)

Personal information
- Full name: Enes Sipović
- Date of birth: 11 September 1990 (age 36)
- Place of birth: Sarajevo, SFR Yugoslavia
- Height: 1.97 m (6 ft 6 in)
- Position: Centre-back

Youth career
- 2006–2009: Željezničar

Senior career*
| Years | Team | Apps | (Gls) |
| 2009–2015 | Oțelul Galați | 30 | (1) |
| 2011 | → Petrolul Ploiești (loan) | 15 | (0) |
| 2012 | → Farul Constanța (loan) | 9 | (0) |
| 2015 | Westerlo | 11 | (0) |
| 2015–2017 | Tanger | 67 | (6) |
| 2017–2018 | Berkane | 37 | (1) |
| 2018–2019 | Ohod | 11 | (0) |
| 2019 | Željezničar | 27 | (1) |
| 2020 | Umm Salal | 11 | (0) |
| 2020–2021 | Chennaiyin | 18 | (0) |
| 2021–2022 | Kerala Blasters | 14 | (1) |
| 2022–2023 | Al-Jahra | 0 | (0) |
| 2023–2024 | Igman Konjic | 10 | (0) |
| 2024 | GOŠK Gabela | 8 | (1) |
| Total | | 268 | (11) |

International career
| 2010–2012 | Bosnia and Herzegovina U21 | 15 | (0) |
- * Club domestic league appearances and goals

Enes Sipović (born 11 September 1990) is a Bosnian former professional footballer who played as a centre-back.

== Club career ==
=== Oțelul Galați ===
On 22 January 2009, Aged 18, Sipović joined Oțelul Galați on a three-and-a-half-year deal. He won the Romanian Liga I in the 2010–11 season with Oțelul Galați. During 2011–12 Sipović was loaned out to Petrolul Ploiești on a season-long loan deal. During 2012–13 Enes was loaned out to Farul Constanța.

=== Westerlo ===
On 7 January 2015, Sipović joined Belgium club Westerlo for the remainder of the season.

=== Ittihad Tanger ===
On 14 July 2015, Sipović joined Moroccan Botola Pro league club Ittihad Tanger on a three-year contract.

=== RS Berkane ===
On 20 September 2017, Sipović joined another Moroccan club RS Berkane on a one-year deal. Enes went to make 37 appearances for club and Morocco.

=== Ohod Club ===
On 17 July 2018, Sipović signed for the MS League outfit Ohod Club on a one-year deal. He played a total of 11 matches throughout the season, and left the club at the end of the season.

=== Željezničar ===
On 6 February 2019, it was announced that Sipović had signed for Liga 12 side Željezničar on a one-and-a-half-year deal. He scored his debut goal on 25 September 2019 against Zvijezda 09, which they won 6–0. After making a total of 11 appearances, he left the club in the winter-transfer window after reaching an agreement with Umm Salal SC.

=== Umm Salal ===
On 27 December 2019, Sipović signed for Qatar Stars League side Umm Salal SC on a two-year deal. He left the club for Chennaiyin FC after having represented the club 11 times during his time at the club.

=== Chennaiyin ===
On 21 September 2020, Sipović joined Indian Super League club Chennaiyin on a one-year deal. He played 18 matches for Chennaiyin, and left the club for southern rivals Kerala Blasters FC.

=== Kerala Blasters ===
On 31 July 2021, Sipović joined Kerala Blasters on a one-year deal. He made his debut for the club on 11 September 2021 against Indian Navy in the 2021 Durand Cup after having named in squad for the tournament. He made his league debut in the 2021–22 Indian Super League season in the match against NorthEast United FC on 15 November, which ended in a 0–0 draw. He played in the 1–1 draw against SC East Bengal on 18 December, where he was substituted in the first half for Abdul Hakku after he was contracted with an injury. On 17 December, the club gave a statement that Sipović has sustained a grade one injury to his quadriceps muscle and would be out for two weeks for recovery. He returned to pitch in the match against Jamshedpur FC as a substitute in the 86th minute for Ruivah Hormipam on 26 December, which ended in a 1–1 draw. He scored his debut goal in the match against SC East Bengal on 14 February 2022, which they won 1–0 due to his thumping header.

== International career ==
At international level, Sipović represented the Bosnia and Herzegovina under-21 national team.

== Personal life ==
Sipović is married to Nejra and together they have a son named Imran, born on 27 May 2022, named after Indian footballer Imran Khan of NorthEast United.

== Honours ==
Oțelul Galați

- Liga I: 2010–11

Kerala Blasters

- Indian Super League runner up: 2021–22.
