= Hervé Guy =

Ivorian footballer (born 1984)

Personal information
- Full name: Hervé Guy Landry Bi Bola
- Date of birth: 17 September 1991 (age 35)
- Place of birth: Yopougon, Ivory Coast
- Height: 1.82 m (6 ft 0 in)
- Position: Defensive midfielder

Youth career
- 2001–2002: SC Bastia

Senior career*
Years	Team	Apps	(Gls)
2002–2007	SC Bastia	5	(0)
2008–2013	Stella Club d'Adjamé		
2013–2017	IR Tanger	35	(11)
2017–2019	Al-Qadisiyah FC	25	(0)
2020	Bhayangkara FC	3	(0)
2020–2022	SCC Mohammédia	47	(2)
2022–2023	Fath Union Sport	25	(2)
2023–2024	Raja CA	12	(0)
- * Club domestic league appearances and goals as of 28 September 2024

Hervé Guy Landry Bi Bola (born 5 August 1984) is an Ivorian professional footballer who plays as a defensive midfielder.

== Club career ==
Guy began his career in the youth ranks of French club SC Bastia and played his first game on 1 February 2003 against AC Ajaccio. He was permanently promoted in 2006 to the Ligue 2 team from SC Bastia. In summer 2007, he left SC Bastia and became a free agent. After a year, he was signed by Stella Club d'Adjamé in the Ligue 1 (Ivory Coast). He spent about five years with the club before becoming a free agent again in February 2013. In July of that year, he was signed by Moroccan club Ittihad Tanger. In July 2017, Guy has been transferred to Saudi Arabian club Al-Qadsiah FC. He made his league debut for the club on 11 August 2017 in a 2–1 victory over Al-Raed FC.

== International career ==
Guy represented the Ivory Coast U-20 team at the 2003 FIFA World Youth Championship in the United Arab Emirates.
