= Abdelghani Mouaoui =

Moroccan footballer

Personal information
- Full name: Abdelghani Mouaoui
- Date of birth: 22 February 1989 (age 37)
- Place of birth: Morocco
- Height: 1.76 m (5 ft 9 in)
- Position: Forward

Team information
- Current team: Ittihad Tanger

Senior career*
Years	Team	Apps	(Gls)
2009–2010	Wydad Casablanca	1	(0)
2010–2011	Chabab Rif Al Hoceima	20	(1)
2011–2012	Wydad Casablanca	8	(0)
2012–2014	Olympic Safi	51	(9)
2015–2017	IR Tanger	53	(10)
2017–2018	Emirates	22	(4)
2018–2019	AS FAR	19	(1)
2019	Olympic Safi	7	(0)
2020	IR Tanger	14	(0)

International career^{‡}
2016–	Morocco	4	(2)
- * Club domestic league appearances and goals as of 01:22, 6 Feb 2021 (UTC) ‡ National team caps and goals as of 08:25, 29 May 2018 (UTC)

Abdelghani Mouaoui (born 22 February 1989) is a Moroccan footballer who plays as a forward.

== International career ==
=== International goals ===
Scores and results list Morocco's goal tally first.

No	Date	Venue	Opponent	Score	Result	Competition
1.	24 January 2016	Amahoro Stadium, Kigali, Rwanda	Rwanda	1–0	4–1	2016 African Nations Championship
2.	24 January 2016	Amahoro Stadium, Kigali, Rwanda	Rwanda	4–1	4–1	2016 African Nations Championship

== Honours ==
Wydad Casablanca

Winner

- Botola: 2014–15

Runner-up

- CAF Champions League: 2011
