= Zaid Krouch =

Moroccan footballer

Personal information
- Full name: Ziad Krouch
- Date of birth: 27 January 1991 (age 35)
- Place of birth: Ifrane, Morocco
- Height: 1.69 m (5 ft 7 in)
- Position: Midfielder

Senior career*
Years	Team	Apps	(Gls)
2013–2018	Moghreb Tétouan	90	(15)
2018–2019	Goa	9	(0)
2019–2021	RS Berkane	48	(2)
2021–2026	Moghreb Tétouan	32	(1)
- * Club domestic league appearances and goals as of 4 May 2026

Zaid Krouch is a Moroccan professional footballer who plays as a midfielder.

== International career ==
In January 2014, coach Hassan Benabicha, invited him to be a part of the Morocca squad for the 2014 African Nations Championship. He helped the team to top group B after drawing with Burkina Faso and Zimbabwe and defeating Uganda. The team was eliminated from the competition at the quarter final zone after losing to Nigeria.

== Honours ==
FC Goa

- Indian Super Cup: 2019

RS Berkane

- CAF Confederation Cup: 2020
