= 2017–18 IR Tanger season =

Tanger
2017–18 season
- President: Abdelhamid Abarchan
- Manager: Ezzaki Badou (until 21 November 2017); Driss El Mrabet
- Stadium: Stade Ibn Batouta
- Botola: Winners
- Coupe du Trône: Round of 16
- Top goalscorer: League: Mehdi Naghmi (13); All: Mehdi Naghmi (16)
- Highest home attendance: 45.000 vs Wydad AC (29 April 2018) vs MA Tétouan (12 May 2018)
- Lowest home attendance: 4.000 vs RC Oued Zem (9 December 2017)
- Average home league attendance: 23,750
- Biggest win: RS Berkane 0–3 IR Tanger; IR Tanger 3–0 CR Al Hoceima
- Biggest defeat: RC Oued Zem 2–0 IR Tanger; CR Al Hoceima 2–0 IR Tanger
Home colours	Away colours	Third colours

The 2017–18 season is Ittihad Riadi Tanger's 35th in existence and the club's 19th season in the top flight of Moroccan football, and Third consecutive season in the first division of Moroccan football after the promotion.

Ittihad Tanger were confirmed to be champions of the 2017–18 Botola season on 12 May 2018, finishing atop the first division of Moroccan football for the first time in club history.

== Kit ==
Supplier: Bang Sports / Club Sponsor: front: Renault, APM Terminals, Moroccan Airports Authority, Tanger-Med; back: Valencia; short: RCI Finance Maroc / League Sponsor: front: Maroc Telecom.

Home	Away	Third

== Season review ==
=== May ===
On 15 May, the club announced the transfers of 17-year-old left-back Hatim El Ouahabi from Widad Juventud for the next five seasons, for 200,000 MAD.

On 20 May, the club announced Ezzaki Badou would be the new IR Tanger coach.

=== June ===
On 2 June, the contracts of players Bakre El Helali, Abdelghani Mouaoui, Mohamed Amsif, Youssef Sekour, Jamal Ait Lamaalem, Zakaria Melhaoui, Soufian El Hassnaoui, Soufiane Gadoum, Ismaël Daoud, Yahya Boumediene, and Abdoulaye Diarra expired.

On 6 June, Ittihad Tanger and both Ayoub El Khaliqi and Mehdi Baltham negotiated a two-year contract extension lasting until 2019.

=== July ===
On 15 July, Ittihad Tanger won their first pre-season match against Rajae Al Boughaz with a 4–0 .

On 18 July, the club loaned Younes Ed-dyb to US Musulmane d'Oujda.

On 19 July, Ittihad Tanger defeated Chabab Alam Tanger 8–0.

On 22 July, Ittihad Tanger were defeated by Moghreb Tétouan 1–0 at Stade Municipal d'Asilah.

On 26 July, the club announced Renault signed up as IR Tanger's new main partner; the French company will appear on the front of the team's shirt for the next three seasons, starting the season 2017–2018.

On 28 July, Ittihad Tanger won 4–0 against KAC Kénitra in a pre-season friendly.

=== August ===
On 3 August, the club announced they have reached an agreement with Al-Qadisiyah for the transfer of Hervé Guy for 300,000 dollars.

On 4 August, Ittihad Tanger were defeated by DR Congo local football team 2–0 at Centre National De Foot Maamoura in Rabat.

On 6 August, the club completed the transfer of 28-year-old forward Mehdi Naghmi from AS FAR on a three-year contract,

On 7 August, Ittihad Tanger defeated Spanish Third División team Algeciras 4–2 in Tangier with goals from Ayoub El Khaliqi, Ismail Benlamalem, Yassine Amrioui and Ahmed Chentouf.

On 10 August, Ittihad Tanger defeated KAC Marrakech 1–0 in a pre-season friendly.

On 16 August, Ittihad Tanger lost 2–1 to Chabab Rif Al Hoceima in the last pre-season friendly match.

On 22 August, Ittihad Tanger drew US Kacemie 1–1, gave USK a slight advantage going into the second leg.

On 27 August, Ittihad Tanger won 1–0 against Union Sidi Kacem; Naghmi scored the only goal from penalty as IRT cruised into the last 16 of the Coupe du Trône.

=== September ===
On 4 September, Ittihad Tanger and Abdelhafid Lirki agreed to mutually terminate the defender's contract.

On 7 September, Ittihad Tanger announced they had reached an agreement with AS Athlétic d'Adjamé for the transfer of N'do Didier Pepe.

On 9 September, Ittihad Tanger defeated RSB Berkane 3–0 in their first Botola match of the season, following an own goal from Laarbi Naji, and Mehdi Naghmi scored two goals.

On 13 September, Ittihad Tanger draw 0–0 against DH Jadidi.

On 18 September, IR Tanger drew 1–1 with Racing AC, with Chentouf scoring the equalizer in the 70th minute.

On 18 September, Ittihad Tanger announced they had reached an agreement with Raja Casablanca for the transfer of Mohamed Bouldini for 60,000 dollars. The player will sign a three-year contract.

On 19 September, the club announced they have reached an agreement with Olympique Khouribga for the transfer of Mame Saher Thioune.

On 21 September, Ittihad Tanger and RSB Berkane reached an agreement for the transfer of Enes Šipović. and the club loaned Abdelali Assri and Abdelghafour Jebroun to Widad Tanger, and Yasser Imrani to Fath Wislan.

=== May ===
On 12 May, Ittihad Tanger defeated Moghreb Tétouan 2–1 to win their 1st Botola title in club history.

== Players ==
=== squad ===
As of 19 February 2018

Note: Flags indicate national team as defined under FIFA eligibility rules; some limited exceptions apply. Players may hold more than one non-FIFA nationality.

No.	Pos.	Nation	Player
1	GK	MAR	Ahmed Reda Tagnaouti (on loan from Wydad AC)
2	DF	MAR	Redouane Mrabet
3	DF	MAR	Hatim El Ouahabi
4	DF	CIV	Didier Pepe
5	MF	MAR	Omar Arjoune
6	MF	MAR	Nouaman Aarab
7	FW	MAR	Mohamed El Amraoui
8	MF	MAR	Khalid Serroukh
9	MF	MAR	Yassine Lebhiri
10	MF	EQG	Pablo Ganet
11	FW	MAR	Ahmed Hammoudan (vice-captain)
15	DF	MAR	Ayoub Jarfi
16	MF	MAR	Ahmed Chentouf
17	FW	MAR	Mehdi Naghmi

No.	Pos.	Nation	Player
18	MF	MAR	Anas Aqachmar
19	FW	MAR	Ayoub Bouraada
22	GK	MAR	Mehdi Ouaya
29	DF	MAR	Oussama El Ghrib (captain)
31	DF	MAR	Ayoub El Khaliqi
33	DF	MAR	Ayman Ben Ali
34	DF	MAR	Abdelmoneim Akhrif
55	GK	MAR	Tarik Aouattah
65	GK	MAR	Hicham El Mejhed
77	FW	MAR	Amine Ennali
93	MF	SEN	Ousseynou Thioune
97	FW	MAR	Zakaria Boulaich
99	FW	BRA	Hugo Almeida

==== From youth squad ====
Note: Flags indicate national team as defined under FIFA eligibility rules; some limited exceptions apply. Players may hold more than one non-FIFA nationality.

No.	Pos.	Nation	Player
27	DF	MAR	Ayman El Kchiri
—	GK	MAR	Ibrahim Chouaybi

No.	Pos.	Nation	Player
—	DF	MAR	Hicham Zghari
—	FW	MAR	Rachid Khattabi

==== Out during the season ====
Note: Flags indicate national team as defined under FIFA eligibility rules; some limited exceptions apply. Players may hold more than one non-FIFA nationality.

No.	Pos.	Nation	Player
10	MF	MAR	Noussair El Maimouni
12	FW	BFA	Bassirou Compaoré
14	DF	MAR	Mehdi Baltham
19	FW	MAR	Samir Belasfar
20	DF	SEN	Mame Saher Thioune

No.	Pos.	Nation	Player
21	MF	MAR	Abdelhafid Lirki
23	DF	MAR	Yassine Amrioui
26	FW	MTN	Ismaël Diakité
27	DF	MAR	Ismail Benlamalem
99	FW	MAR	Mohamed Bouldini

=== Transfers ===
==== In (summer) ====
Note: Flags indicate national team as defined under FIFA eligibility rules; some limited exceptions apply. Players may hold more than one non-FIFA nationality.

No.	Pos.	Nation	Player
3	DF	MAR	Hatim El Ouahabi (from Widad Juventud de Tanger) IRTfoot.ma
--	FW	UGA	Dan Sserunkuma (from (Kenya) Bandari F.C.)
17	FW	MAR	Mehdi Naghmi (from FAR Rabat) IRTfoot.ma
4	DF	CIV	Didier Pepe (from (Ivory Coast) AS Athlétic d'Adjamé) IRTfoot.ma
99	FW	MAR	Mohamed Bouldini (from Raja Casablanca) IRTfoot.ma (600.000 MAD)
55	GK	MAR	Tarik Aouattah (from Chabab Rif Al Hoceima)
1	GK	MAR	Ahmed Reda Tagnaouti (on loan from Wydad Casablanca)
20	DF	SEN	Mame Saher Thioune (from Chabab Atlas Khénifra)
2	DF	MAR	Redwan Mrabet (from Hassania Agadir)
23	DF	MAR	Yassine Amrioui (from (Bulgaria) FC Vereya)
5	MF	MAR	Omar Arjoune (from Raja Casablanca)
21	MF	MAR	Abdelhafid Lirki (from AS FAR)
6	MF	MAR	Nouaman Aarab (from Chabab Atlas Khénifra)
8	MF	MAR	Khalid Serroukh (from JS Massira)
10	MF	MAR	Noussair El Maimouni (from Moghreb Tétouan)
9	MF	MAR	Yassine Lebhiri (from Chabab Rif Al Hoceima)
18	MF	MAR	Anas Aqachmar (from Wydad de Fès)
19	FW	MAR	Samir Belasfar (from Ittihad Khemisset)
7	FW	MAR	Mohammed El Amraoui (from TAS de Casablanca)
26	FW	MTN	Ismaël Diakité (from (Saudi Arabia) Khaleej FC)
12	MF	BFA	Bassirou Compaoré (from (Burkina Faso) AS SONABEL)

==== Out (summer) ====
Note: Flags indicate national team as defined under FIFA eligibility rules; some limited exceptions apply. Players may hold more than one non-FIFA nationality.

No.	Pos.	Nation	Player
21	MF	MAR	Bakre El Helali (to Nahdat Berkane) IRTfoot.ma
17	FW	MAR	Abdelghani Mouaoui (to (United Arab Emirates) Emirates Club) IRTfoot.ma
1	GK	MAR	Mohamed Amsif (Fath Union Sport) IRTfoot.ma
10	MF	MAR	Youssef Sekour (to (Qatar) Umm Salal SC) IRTfoot.ma
5	DF	MAR	Jamal Ait Lamaalem (to Olympique Khouribga) IRTfoot.ma
2	DF	MAR	Zakaria Melhaoui (to MC Oujda) IRTfoot.ma
20	FW	MAR	Soufian El Hassnaoui (End of contract) IRTfoot.ma
8	MF	MAR	Soufiane Gadoum (End of contract) IRTfoot.ma
9	FW	MAR	Ismaël Daoud (to (Belgium) K.S.K. Ronse) IRTfoot.ma
7	FW	MAR	Yahya Boumediene (to (Peru) FBC Melgar) IRTfoot.ma
19	FW	MLI	Abdoulaye Diarra (to Rapide Oued Zem) IRTfoot.ma
--	FW	UGA	Dan Sserunkuma (to (Uganda) Express FC)
71	MF	CIV	Hervé Guy (to (Saudi Arabia) Al-Qadisiyah FC) IRTfoot.ma ($300.000 )
23	FW	MAR	Younes Ed-dyb (on loan at US Musulmane d'Oujda) IRTfoot.ma
21	MF	MAR	Abdelhafid Lirki (to Olympic Safi) IRTfoot.ma
20	DF	SEN	Mame Saher Thioune (to Olympique Khouribga) IRTfoot.ma
25	DF	BIH	Enes Šipović (to RS Berkane) IRTfoot.ma (? $99.000 )
32	MF	MAR	Abdelali Assri (on loan at Widad Juventud de Tanger) IRTfoot.ma
37	MF	MAR	Abdelghafour Jebroun (on loan at Widad Juventud de Tanger) IRTfoot.ma
55	DF	MAR	Yasser Imrani (on loan at Fath Wislan Meknes) IRTfoot.ma
28	GK	MAR	Issam Badda (End of contract)
13	FW	CGO	Ismaël Ankobo (to AS FAR)
99	FW	MAR	Youness Hawassi (to Difaâ El Jadidi)
24	MF	MAR	Adil Chihi
33	GK	MAR	Badr El Hamadi

==== In (winter) ====
Note: Flags indicate national team as defined under FIFA eligibility rules; some limited exceptions apply. Players may hold more than one non-FIFA nationality.

No.	Pos.	Nation	Player
99	FW	BRA	Hugo Almeida (from (Brazil) América Futebol Clube (MG)) IRTfoot.ma
77	FW	MAR	Amine Ennali (from (Netherlands) Achilles '29) IRTfoot.ma
10	MF	EQG	Pablo Ganet (from (Spain) Algeciras CF) IRTfoot.ma
65	GK	MAR	Hicham El Mejhed (from Hassania Agadir) IRTfoot.ma

==== Out (winter) ====
Note: Flags indicate national team as defined under FIFA eligibility rules; some limited exceptions apply. Players may hold more than one non-FIFA nationality.

No.	Pos.	Nation	Player
12	MF	BFA	Bassirou Compaoré (to Chabab Atlas Khénifra) IRTfoot.ma
23	DF	MAR	Yassine Amrioui (to Olympique Khouribga) IRTfoot.ma
26	FW	MTN	Ismaël Diakhité (to (Mauritania) ASAC Concorde) IRTfoot.ma
99	FW	MAR	Mohamed Bouldini (End of contract) IRTfoot.ma
10	MF	MAR	Noussair El Maimouni (on loan at Moghreb Tétouan) IRTfoot.ma
14	DF	MAR	Mehdi Baltham (to Olympique Khouribga)
27	DF	MAR	Ismail Benlamalem (to Raja Casablanca) RajaClubAthletic.ma
19	FW	MAR	Samir Belasfar

=== Technical staff ===
Position	Name
First team head coach	(Morocco) Ezzaki Badou
Assistant coach	(Morocco) Driss El Mrabet
Goalkeeping coach	(Morocco) Mohamed Jbari
Fitness coach	(Morocco) Saïd Hammouni

until 21 November 2017

Position	Name
First team head coach	(Morocco) Driss El Mrabet
Assistant coach	(Morocco) Abdelouahed Belqassem
Goalkeeping coach	(Morocco) Mohamed Jbari
Fitness coach	(Morocco) Saïd Hammouni

== Statistics ==
=== Squad appearances and goals ===
Last updated on 20 May 2018.

No.	Pos	Nat	Player	Total		Botola		Coupe du Trône	
No.	Pos	Nat	Player	Apps	Goals	Apps	Goals	Apps	Goals
Goalkeepers
1	GK	(Morocco) MAR	Ahmed Reda Tagnaouti	25	-18	23	(-17)	2	(-1)
22	GK	(Morocco) MAR	Mehdi Ouaya	5	-2	3	(-1)	2	(-1)
55	GK	(Morocco) MAR	Tarik Aouattah	4	-3	4	(-3)	0	0
65	GK	(Morocco) MAR	Hicham El Mejhed	1	-2	0+1	(-2)	0	0
Defenders
2	DF	(Morocco) MAR	Redwan Mrabet	23	0	22+1	0	0	0
3	DF	(Morocco) MAR	Hatim El Ouahabi	0	0	0	0	0	0
4	DF	(Ivory Coast) CIV	Didier Pepe	25	0	22+1	0	2	0
15	DF	(Morocco) MAR	Ayoub Jarfi	20	0	20	0	0	0
27	DF	(Morocco) MAR	Ayman El Kchiri	1	0	1	0	0	0
29	DF	(Morocco) MAR	Oussama El Ghrib	32	2	28	2	4	0
31	DF	(Morocco) MAR	Ayoub El Khaliqi	18	0	10+4	0	4	0
33	DF	(Morocco) MAR	Ayman Ben Ali	1	0	1	0	0	0
34	DF	(Morocco) MAR	Abdelmoneim Akhrif	1	0	1	0	0	0
97	DF	(Morocco) MAR	Zakaria Boulaich	2	0	2	0	0	0
Midfielders
5	MF	(Morocco) MAR	Omar Arjoune	20	1	15+5	1	0	0
6	MF	(Morocco) MAR	Nouaman Aarab	23	0	16+6	0	0+1	0
8	MF	(Morocco) MAR	Khalid Serroukh	33	4	25+4	4	3+1	0
9	MF	(Morocco) MAR	Yassine Lebhiri	21	2	17+2	2	1+1	0
10	MF	(Equatorial Guinea) EQG	Pablo Ganet	11	0	2+9	0	0	0
16	MF	(Morocco) MAR	Ahmed Chentouf	13	2	2+10	2	1	0
18	MF	(Morocco) MAR	Anas Aqachmar	11	0	4+5	0	1+1	0
93	MF	(Senegal) SEN	Ousseynou Thioune	28	0	23+1	0	4	0
Forwards
7	FW	(Morocco) MAR	Mohamed El Amraoui	10	2	1+8	2	0+1	0
11	FW	(Morocco) MAR	Ahmed Hammoudan	33	4	28+1	4	3+1	0
17	FW	(Morocco) MAR	Mehdi Naghmi	33	16	29	13	4	3
19	FW	(Morocco) MAR	Ayoub Bouraada	1	0	1	0	0	0
77	FW	(Morocco) MAR	Amine Ennali	1	0	1	0	0	0
99	FW	(Brazil) BRA	Hugo Guimarães Silva Santos Almeida	13	1	8+5	1	0	0
Players who have made an appearance or had a squad number this season but have left the club
~~20~~	DF	(Senegal) SEN	Mame Saher Thioune	1	0	0	0	1	0
~~21~~	MF	(Morocco) MAR	Abdelhafid Lirki	1	0	0	0	0+1	0
~~10~~	MF	(Morocco) MAR	Noussair El Maimouni	12	0	5+3	0	3+1	0
~~12~~	FW	(Burkina Faso) BFA	Bassirou Compaoré	11	0	6+4	0	1	0
~~23~~	DF	(Morocco) MAR	Yassine Amrioui	0	0	0	0	0	0
~~26~~	FW	(Mauritania) MTN	Ismaël Diakité	10	0	2+5	0	3	0
~~99~~	FW	(Morocco) MAR	Mohamed Bouldini	7	0	0+6	0	0+1	0
~~14~~	DF	(Morocco) MAR	Mehdi Baltham	1	0	0	0	1	0
~~27~~	DF	(Morocco) MAR	Ismail Benlamalem	12	1	8	1	4	0
~~19~~	FW	(Morocco) MAR	Samir Belasfar	1	0	0	0	0+1	0

=== Goalscorers ===
No.	Pos.	Nation	Name	Botola	Coupe du Trône	Total
17	FW	(Morocco)	Mehdi Naghmi	13	3	16
11	FW	(Morocco)	Ahmed Hammoudan	4	0	4
8	MF	(Morocco)	Khalid Serroukh	4	0	4
7	FW	(Morocco)	Mohamed El Amraoui	2	0	2
29	DF	(Morocco)	Oussama El Ghrib	2	0	2
9	MF	(Morocco)	Yassine Lebhiri	2	0	2
16	MF	(Morocco)	Ahmed Chentouf	2	0	2
99	FW	(Brazil)	Hugo Almeida	1	0	1
5	MF	(Morocco)	Omar Arjoune	1	0	1
~~27~~	DF	(Morocco)	Ismail Benlamalem	1	0	1
#	Own goals			2	0	2
TOTAL				34	3	37

=== Assists ===
No.	Pos.	Nation	Name	Botola	Coupe du Trône	Total
8	MF	(Morocco)	Khalid Serroukh	5	0	5
11	FW	(Morocco)	Ahmed Hammoudan	4	1	5
17	FW	(Morocco)	Mehdi Naghmi	3	0	3
29	DF	(Morocco)	Oussama El Ghrib	2	0	2
9	MF	(Morocco)	Yassine Lebhiri	1	0	1
5	MF	(Morocco)	Omar Arjoune	1	0	1
10	MF	(Equatorial Guinea)	Pablo Ganet	1	0	1
~~99~~	FW	(Morocco)	Mohamed Bouldini	1	0	1
TOTAL				18	1	19

=== Clean sheets ===
As of 20 May 2018.

Rank	Name	Botola	Coupe du Trône	Total	Played Games
—	(Morocco) Tagnaouti	11	1	12	25
—	(Morocco) Ouaya	1	1	2	5
—	(Morocco) Aouattah	1	0	1	4
—	(Morocco) El Mejhed	0	0	0	1
Total		13	2	15	34

=== Disciplinary record ===
N	P	Nat.	Name	Botola			Coupe du Trône			Total			Notes
N	P	Nat.	Name	Yellow card	Second yellow card	Red card	Yellow card	Second yellow card	Red card	Yellow card	Second yellow card	Red card	Notes
1	GK	(Morocco)	Ahmed Reda Tagnaouti	1						1			
2	DF	(Morocco)	Redwan Mrabet	3						3			
4	DF	(Ivory Coast)	Didier Pepe	7						7			
5	MF	(Morocco)	Omar Arjoune	6						6			
6	MF	(Morocco)	Nouaman Aarab	1						1			
7	FW	(Morocco)	Mohamed El Amraoui	1						1			
8	MF	(Morocco)	Khalid Serroukh	2						2			
9	MF	(Morocco)	Yassine Lebhiri	1						1			
11	FW	(Morocco)	Ahmed Hammoudan	1			1			2			
15	DF	(Morocco)	Ayoub Jarfi	3						3			
17	FW	(Morocco)	Mehdi Naghmi	5						5			
22	GK	(Morocco)	Mehdi Ouaya			1						1	
29	DF	(Morocco)	Oussama El Ghrib	4			1			5			
31	DF	(Morocco)	Ayoub El Khaliqi	1						1			
93	MF	(Senegal)	Ousseynou Thioune	7	2					7	2		
99	FW	(Brazil)	Hugo Almeida	5						5			
~~26~~	FW	(Mauritania)	Ismaël Diakité				1			1			
~~27~~	DF	(Morocco)	Ismail Belmaalem	3			1			4			
~~99~~	FW	(Morocco)	Mohamed Bouldini	1						1			

Last updated: 20 May 2018
Source: mountakhab.net
Only competitive matches
(yellow card) = Number of bookings; (second yellow card) = Number of sending offs after a second yellow card; (red card) = Number of sending offs by a direct red card.

== Pre-season and friendlies ==
15 July 2017 1	IR Tanger (Morocco)	4–0	(Morocco) Raja Boughaz	Tangier, Morocco
17:00 UTC+1	Hawassi; Amrioui; Serroukh; Bassirou	Report		Stadium: Stade Centre Ziaten

19 July 2017 2	IR Tanger (Morocco)	8–0	(Morocco) Chabab Alam Tanger	Tangier, Morocco
11:30 UTC+1	El Omari; El Amraoui; Diarra; Hawassi; Bassirou	Report		Stadium: Stade Centre Ziaten

22 July 2017 3	IR Tanger (Morocco)	0–1	(Morocco) MA Tétouan	Asilah, Morocco
17:00 UTC+1		Report	El Barrak	Stadium: Stade Municipal d'Asilah

28 July 2017 4	IR Tanger (Morocco)	4–0	(Morocco) Kénitra AC	Asilah, Morocco
18:00 UTC+1	Bassirou; Diarra; Ankobo	Report		Stadium: Stade Municipal d'Asilah

4 August 2017 5	IR Tanger (Morocco)	0–2	(Democratic Republic of the Congo) DR Congo A'	Rabat, Morocco
17:30 UTC+1		Report	Goal	Stadium: Sports Center of FAR

7 August 2017 6	IR Tanger (Morocco)	4–2	(Spain) Algeciras CF	Tangier, Morocco
21:00 UTC+1	El Maimouni (yellow card); El Khaliqi 70'; Benlamalem 74'; Amrioui 80'; Chentouf 90'	IRT Report; ACF Report	Ito 3'; Ganet 45'	Stadium: Stade Ibn Batouta; Attendance: 4,000; Referee: Haddou Ali

10 August 2017 7	IR Tanger (Morocco)	1–0	(Morocco) KAC Marrakech	Tangier, Morocco
18:00 UTC+1	Naghmi 82'	Report		Stadium: Stade Centre Ziaten

16 August 2017 8	IR Tanger (Morocco)	1–2	(Morocco) CR Al Hoceima	Tangier, Morocco
18:00 UTC+1	Naghmi 5'	Report	Goal	Stadium: Stade Centre Ziaten

7 October 2017 9	IR Tanger (Morocco)	7–0	(Morocco) Ch. Ben Diban T	Tangier, Morocco
11:00 UTC+1	Aqachmar 60'; El Amraoui 62'; Bouldini 65'; Mrabet; Serroukh	Report		Stadium: Stade Centre Ziaten
Note: 120-minute match

11 October 2017 10	IR Tanger (Morocco)	4–1	(Morocco) Ajax Tanger	Tangier, Morocco
16:30 UTC+1	Lebhiri; Bouldini; Diakhité	Report	Goal	Stadium: Stade Centre Ziaten

8 November 2017 11	Chabab Asilah (Morocco)	0–4	(Morocco) IR Tanger	Asilah, Morocco
11:00 UTC			Lebhiri (pen.); Bouldini; Diakhité	Stadium: Stade Municipal d'Asilah

17 January 2018 12	Renaissance Martil (Morocco)	2–2	(Morocco) IR Tanger	Tetouan, Morocco
11:00 UTC	Goal	Report	Naghmi 40'; Ganet	Stadium: Stade Malaliyine

20 January 2018 13	IR Tanger (Morocco)	2–0	(Morocco) Kénitra AC	Tetouan, Morocco
13:00 UTC	Thioune (yellow card); Aarab 40'; Ganet (yellow card); Nali 70'	Report		Stadium: Stade Saniat Rmel

24 January 2018 14	San Roque (Spain)	0–4	(Morocco) IR Tanger	Huelva, Spain
15:00 UTC		Report	Pepe; Naghmi; Nali; Chentouf

27 January 2018 15	Ulsan Hyundai (South Korea)	0–1	(Morocco) IR Tanger	Portimão, Portugal
14:20 UTC		Report	Ganet (yellow card) 80'; Naghmi 90'

30 January 2018 16	Recreativo de Huelva (Spain)	0–2	(Morocco) IR Tanger	Huelva, Spain
15:30 UTC		Report	El Khaliqi; El Amraoui	Stadium: Punta Umbría Stadium

7 February 2018 17	IR Tanger (Morocco)	8–0	(Morocco) Chabab Larache	Tangier, Morocco
--:-- UTC+1	Serroukh; Thioune; El Amraoui; Chentouf; Hugo; Ganet; Naghmi	Report		Stadium: Stade Centre Ziaten

== Competitions ==
=== Overview ===
Competition	First match	Last match	Starting round	Final position	Record							
Competition	First match	Last match	Starting round	Final position	Pld	W	D	L	GF	GA	GD	Win %
Botola	9 September 2017	20 May 2018	Matchday 1	Winners	30	14	10	6	34	23	+11	46.67
Coupe du Trône	22 August 2017	20 September 2017	Round of 32	Round of 16	4	1	3	0	3	2	+1	25.00
Total					34	15	13	6	37	25	+12	44.12

Last updated: 20 May 2018.
Source: Competitions

=== Botola ===
==== League table ====
Pos	Team	Pld	W	D	L	GF	GA	GD	Pts	Qualification or relegation
1	IR Tanger (C)	30	14	10	6	34	23	+11	52	Qualification for the CAF Champions League
2	Wydad Casablanca	30	14	9	7	44	26	+18	51 (Note: Wydad Casablanca finished ahead of Hassania Agadir on goals scored: Wydad Casablanca 44, hassania Agadir 40)	Qualification for the CAF Champions League
3	Hassania Agadir	30	13	12	5	40	22	+18	51	Qualification for the CAF Confederation Cup
4	FUS Rabat	30	13	10	7	34	26	+8	49	
5	Difaâ El Jadidi	30	13	9	8	49	33	+16	48 (Note: Difaa Jadidi finished ahead of Raja Casablanca on head-to-head goal difference: Difaa Jadidi 2–1 Raja Casablanca, Raja Casablanca 3–2 Difaa Jadidi)	

Source: frmf.ma
Rules for classification: 1) Points; 2) Head-to-head points; 3) Head-to-head goal difference; 4) Goal difference; 5) Goals scored; 6) Fair-play points; 7) Play-off.
(C) Champions

==== Results summary ====
Overall								Home						Away					
Pld	W	D	L	GF	GA	GD	Pts	W	D	L	GF	GA	GD	W	D	L	GF	GA	GD
30	14	10	6	34	23	+11	52	9	4	2	19	9	+10	5	6	4	15	14	+1

Last updated: 20 May 2018.
Source: Competitive matches

==== Results by round ====
Round	1	2	3	4	5	6	7	8	9	10	11	12	13	14	15	16	17	18	19	20	21	22	23	24	25	26	27	28	29	30
Ground	A	H	A	H	A	H	H	A	H	A	H	A	H	A	H	H	A	H	A	H	A	A	H	A	H	A	H	A	H	A
Result	W	D	D	D	D	L	D	L	W	D	W	W	W	W	W	W	W	W	D	W	L	D	W	W	L	L	D	D	W	L
Position	1	2	4	3	3	7	11	12	10	10	6	4	3	2	2	3	1	1	1	1	1	1	1	1	1	1	1	1	1	1

Updated to match(es) played on 20 May 2018. Source: League matches
A = Away; H = Home; W = Win; D = Draw; L = Loss

==== Matches ====
9 September 2017 1	RS Berkane	0–3	IR Tanger	Oujda
16:00 UTC+1	Lmobaraky (yellow card) 53'; Amaanan (yellow card) 63'; Mhamdi (yellow card) 78'; Namsaoui (yellow card) 83'	Report	Naji 24' (o.g.); O. Thioune (yellow card) 45'; Naghmi 73', 79' (pen.); El Ghrib (yellow card) 75'	Stadium: Stade Municipal (Oujda); Referee: Samir Guezzaz

17 September 2017 2	IR Tanger	1–1	Racing AC	Tangier
18:00 UTC+1	Chentouf 70'; Benlamalem (yellow card) 75'; O. Thioune (yellow card) 84'	Report	Hariss (yellow card) 33'; Fellat 35'; Fenchy (yellow card) 53'; Karaoui (yellow card) 58'; Felciat (yellow card) 90'	Stadium: Stade Ibn Batouta; Attendance: 21.000; Referee: Daki Radad

24 September 2017 3	OC Khouribga	1–1	IR Tanger	Khouribga
18:00 UTC+1	Oggadi 30' (pen.) (yellow card) 46'; Mame Saher (yellow card) 55'; Mazgouri (yellow card) 73'	Report	Serroukh 10'; Benlamalem (yellow card) 32'; Pepe (yellow card) 35'	Stadium: Complexe OCP; Attendance: 10.000; Referee: Jamal Belbasri

1 October 2017 4	IR Tanger	1–1	Raja CA	Tangier
16:00 UTC+1	Lebhiri (yellow card) 32'; Serroukh (yellow card) 47'; Naghmi 55' (yellow card) 63'; Bouldini (yellow card) 84'; Thioune (yellow card) 88'; El Khaliqi (yellow card) 90+3'	Report	Achchakir 23'; Jbira (yellow card) 32'; Benhalib (yellow card) 57'; Banoun (yellow card) 90+3'	Stadium: Stade Ibn Batouta; Attendance: 25.000; Referee: Redouane Jiyed

20 October 2017 5	KAC Marrakech	2–2	IR Tanger	Marrakesh
19:00 UTC+1	Mufadl 21'; El Hany (yellow card) 52'; Amimi 81' (yellow card) 83'; Nassik (yellow card) 84'; El Haki (yellow card) 90'	Report	Naghmi 20'; El Ghrib (yellow card) 76'; Benlamalem 90+7' (pen.)	Stadium: Marrakesh Stadium; Attendance: 7.500; Referee: Noureddine Jaafari

29 October 2017 6	IR Tanger	0–1	AS FAR	Tangier
17:00 UTC	Naghmi (penalty missed); Tagnaouti (yellow card) 50'	Report	Bakayoko (yellow card) 46'; Berrahma 51' (pen.); El Bourkadi (yellow card) 55'; Toungara (yellow card) 87'	Stadium: Stade Ibn Batouta; Referee: Taoufik Gourar

4 November 2017 7	IR Tanger	2–2	HUS Agadir	Tangier
15:00 UTC	Naghmi 38'; El Ghrib (yellow card) 48' (goal) 90+4'; Hammoudan (yellow card) 88'; Thioune (yellow card) 90+2'	Report	Daoudi (yellow card) 51'; Kachani 83'; El Berkaoui 84'	Stadium: Stade Ibn Batouta; Attendance: 7.000; Referee: Samir Geuzzaz

17 November 2017 8	OC Safi	1–0	IR Tanger	Safi
17:00 UTC	Khabba 44'; Niya (yellow card) 51'; Hamdan (yellow card) 65'; El Atochy (yellow card) 70'; Attiyallah (yellow card) 83'; Lirki (yellow card) 86'	Report	Jarfi (yellow card) 61'	Stadium: Stade El Massira; Attendance: 6.000; Referee: Abdelouahed Fatihi

24 November 2017 9	IR Tanger	1–0	CA Khénifra	Tangier
15:00 UTC	Naghmi 30' (pen.); Benlamalem (yellow card) 73'; Serroukh (yellow card) 89'; Thioune (yellow card) 90+4'	Report	El Masskini (yellow card) 42'; Sène (yellow card) 46'; N'Diaye (yellow card) 57'	Stadium: Stade Ibn Batouta; Attendance: 4.000; Referee: Khalid Ennouni

3 December 2017 10	Fath US	0–0	IR Tanger	Rabat
15:00 UTC	Badammosi (yellow card) 46'; Mandaw (yellow card) 67'; Bettache (yellow card) 68'; Louani (yellow card) 87'; Diakite (yellow card) 89'	Report	Pepe (yellow card) 51'; Mrabet (yellow card) 88'	Stadium: Stade Moulay Hassan; Attendance: 750; Referee: Hicham Tiyazi

9 December 2017 11	IR Tanger	1–0	RC Oued Zem	Tangier
15:00 UTC	Lebhiri 43'	Report	El Hasnaoui (yellow card) 13'	Stadium: Stade Ibn Batouta; Attendance: 4.000; Referee: Karim Sabri

18 December 2017 12	Wydad AC	0–1	IR Tanger	Rabat
15:00 UTC	Nekkach (yellow card) 66'	Report	Naghmi (penalty missed) 59'; Thioune (yellow card) 42' (yellow-red card) 90'; Jarfi (yellow card) 70'	Stadium: Prince Moulay Abdellah Stadium; Attendance: 5.000; Referee: Youssef Harraoui

23 December 2017 13	IR Tanger	1–0	DH Jadida	Larache
15:00 UTC	Pepe (yellow card) 7'; Serroukh 38' (pen.); Arjoune (yellow card) 79'; Naghmi (yellow card) 88'	Report	Asstati (yellow card) 27'; Bamaamar (yellow card) 59'	Stadium: Stade Municipal (Larache); Attendance: 5.000; Referee: Mustapha Kechaf

27 December 2017 14	MA Tétouan	0–1	IR Tanger	Tétouan
14:00 UTC	Yekhlaf (yellow card) 59'; Hajji (yellow card) 61'; El Wardi (yellow card) 90+3'	Report	Hammoudan 45'; Pepe (yellow card) 92'	Stadium: Stade Saniat Rmel; Attendance: 7.000; Referee: Adil Zourak

30 December 2017 15	IR Tanger	3–0	CR Al-Hoceima	Tangier
19:00 UTC	Naghmi 57'; El Amraoui 78', 85' (yellow card) 80'; Mrabet (yellow card) 87'	Report	El Mallouki (penalty missed)	Stadium: Stade Ibn Batouta; Attendance: 32.000; Referee: Jamal Belbasri

14 February 2018 16	IR Tanger	2–1	RS Berkane	Tangier
17:00 UTC	Hammoudan 15'; Pepe (yellow card) 32'; Naghmi 48'; Hugo Almeida (yellow card) 63'	Report	El Kass (yellow card) 37'; Ennamsaoui (yellow card) 44'; Ould Lhaj 90+1'; El Helali (yellow card) 90+4'	Stadium: Stade Ibn Batouta; Attendance: 14.000; Referee: Hicham Tiyazi

19 February 2018 17	Racing AC	1–2	IR Tanger	Casablanca
15:00 UTC	Fellat (yellow card) 42'; Traori (yellow card) 57'; Ouattara 82' (yellow card) 90+4'; El Madani (yellow card) 90+1'	Report	Pepe (yellow card) 43'; Serroukh 55' (pen.); Thioune (yellow card) 73'; Arjoune (yellow card) 82'; El Ghrib 90+1'; Hugo Almeida (yellow card) 90+4'	Stadium: Stade d'Étoile Jeunesse; Attendance: 1.000; Referee: Redouane Jiyed

25 February 2018 18	IR Tanger	2–0	OC Khouribga	Tangier
17:00 UTC	Naghmi 38' (pen.); Hugo Almeida 55' (pen.)	Report	Mazgouri (yellow card) 45'; Mame Saher (yellow card) 54'; Ennaffati (yellow card) 57'	Stadium: Stade Ibn Batouta; Attendance: 38.000; Referee: Mohamed Nhyeh

2 March 2018 19	Raja CA	1–1	IR Tanger	Casablanca
19:00 UTC	Zniti (yellow card) 10'; Douik (yellow card) 31'; Iajour 57'	Report	Naghmi 12' (pen.); Thioune (yellow card) 86'	Stadium: Stade Mohammed V Attendance: 0 (punishment); Referee: Adil Zourak

10 March 2018 20	IR Tanger	1–0	KAC Marrakech	Tangier
17:00 UTC	Naghmi (yellow card) 9'; Hammoudan 81'	Report	El Hany (yellow card) 65'; Braro (yellow card) 70'	Stadium: Stade Ibn Batouta; Attendance: 12.500; Referee: Jalal Jayed

18 March 2018 21	AS FAR	2–1	IR Tanger	Rabat
15:00 UTC	El Had (yellow card) 60'; Kaddioui (yellow card) 62'; Diawara 77' (pen.); Bezghoudi 90+1'	Report	Aarab (yellow card) 40'; Arjoune (yellow card) 49'; Serroukh 61' (pen.)	Stadium: Prince Moulay Abdellah Stadium; Attendance: 27.000; Referee: Noureddine Jaafari

25 March 2018 22	HUS Agadir	1–1	IR Tanger	Agadir
15:00 UTC	El Berkaoui 22'; Rami (yellow card) 82'	Report	Naghmi 78'; Hugo Almeida (yellow card) 82'	Stadium: Stade Adrar; Attendance: 30.000; Referee: Abderrahim Yagoubi

1 April 2018 23	IR Tanger	1–0	OC Safi	Tangier
19:00 UTC+1	Hammoudan 26'; Naghmi (yellow card) 44'; El Ghrib (yellow card) 56'; Pepe (yellow card) 62'; Mrabet (yellow card) 85'; Hugo Almeida (yellow card) 90+2'	Report	Niya (yellow card) 39'	Stadium: Stade Ibn Batouta; Attendance: 40.000; Referee: Mustapha Kechaf

7 April 2018 24	CA Khénifra	0–1	IR Tanger	Khénifra
16:00 UTC+1	Gaadaoui (yellow card) 25'; El Baz (yellow card) 35'; Sene (yellow card) 90+5'	Report	Lebhiri 7'; Thioune (yellow card) 28' (yellow-red card) 90+3'; Arjoune (yellow card) 88'	Stadium: Stade Municipal (Khénifra); Attendance: 7.000; Referee: Hicham Tiyazi

15 April 2018 25	IR Tanger	1–2	Fath US	Tangier
20:00 UTC+1	Naghmi 89'	Report	Aguerd (yellow card) 46'; Amsif (yellow card) 70'; El Bahraoui 81', 84' (yellow card) 85'; El Bassil (yellow card) 90+4'	Stadium: Stade Ibn Batouta; Attendance: 40.000; Referee: Karim Sabri

23 April 2018 26	RC Oued Zem	2–0	IR Tanger	Oued Zem
16:00 UTC+1	Sidibé 12'; El Mejhdi 52'; Berrabeh (yellow card) 61'	Report	Arjoune (yellow card) 51'	Stadium: Stade Municipal (Oued Zem); Attendance: 13.000; Referee: Adil Zourak

29 April 2018 27	IR Tanger	0–0	Wydad AC	Tangier
16:00 UTC+1	Hugo Almeida (yellow card) 79'	Report	Saidi (yellow card) 30'; El Asbahi (yellow card) 90+4'	Stadium: Stade Ibn Batouta; Attendance: 45.000; Referee: Abderrahim Yagoubi

9 May 2018 28	DH Jadida	1–1	IR Tanger	El Jadida
20:00 UTC+1	Ahaddad 45+2'; Hamami (yellow card) 71'; Jayed (yellow card) 77'	Report	Arjoune 17' (yellow card) 39'; Jarfi (yellow card) 80'	Stadium: Stade El Abdi; Attendance: 15.000; Referee: Redouane Jiyed

12 May 2018 29	IR Tanger	2–1	MA Tétouan	Tangier
19:00 UTC+1	Chentouf 48'; El Moussaoui 60' (o.g.); Naghmi (yellow card) 71'	Report	Fall 28'; El Moussaoui (yellow card) 50'; El Gourch (yellow card) 62'; Mouddane (yellow card) 67'	Stadium: Stade Ibn Batouta; Attendance: 45.000; Referee: Adil Zourak

20 May 2018 30	CR Al-Hoceima	2–0	IR Tanger	Fez
22:00 UTC	Fennich 30'; El Mallouki 46'	Report	Ouaya (red card) 14'	Stadium: Fez Stadium; Attendance: 0 (closed doors); Referee: Noureddine Jaafari

==== Results overview ====
Locations of the 2016–17 Botola teams

Win Draw Loss

Region	Team	Home score	Away score	Aggregate
Casablanca-Settat	Difaâ El Jadidi	1–0	1–1	2–1
Casablanca-Settat	Racing de Casablanca	1–1	1–2	3–2
Casablanca-Settat	Raja Casablanca	1–1	1–1	2–2
Casablanca-Settat	Wydad Casablanca	0–0	0–1	1–0
Béni Mellal-Khénifra	Chabab Atlas Khénifra	1–0	0–1	2–0
Béni Mellal-Khénifra	Olympique Khouribga	2–0	1–1	3–1
Béni Mellal-Khénifra	Rapide Oued Zem	1–0	2–0	1–2
Tangier-Tétouan-Al Hoceima	Chabab Rif Al Hoceima	3–0	2–0	3–2
Tangier-Tétouan-Al Hoceima	Moghreb Tétouan	2–1	0–1	3–1
Marrakesh-Safi	Kawkab Marrakech	1–0	2–2	3–2
Marrakesh-Safi	Olympic Safi	1–0	1–0	1–1
Rabat-Salé-Kénitra	AS FAR	0–1	2–1	1–3
Rabat-Salé-Kénitra	Fath Union Sport	1–2	0–0	1–2
Oriental	RS Berkane	2–1	0–3	5–1
Souss-Massa	Hassania Agadir	2–2	1–1	3–3

=== Throne Cup ===
==== Round of 32 ====
22 August 2017 First leg	IR Tanger	1–1	US Kacemie	Tangier
21:00 UTC+1	Naghmi 5' (pen.); Diakité (yellow card) 58'; El Ghrib (yellow card) 66'; Benlamalem (yellow card) 74'	Report	Amri 69' (pen.); Brahmi (yellow card) 83'	Stadium: Stade Ibn Batouta; Attendance: 10,000; Referee: Nabil Benrquia

27 August 2017 Second leg	US Kacemie	0–1 (1–2 agg.)	IR Tanger	Sidi Kacem
16:00 UTC+1		Report	Naghmi 72' (pen.)	Stadium: Stade Abdelkader-Allam; Referee: Karim Sabri

==== Round of 16 ====
13 September 2017 First leg	DH Jadida	0–0	IR Tanger	El Jadida
19:00 UTC+1		Report		Stadium: Stade El Abdi; Referee: Jalal Jayed

20 September 2017 Second leg	IR Tanger	1–1 (1–1a agg.)	DH Jadida	Tangier
20:30 UTC+1	Naghmi 11'; Hammoudan (yellow card) 89'		Ngah 37'; Asstati (yellow card)	Stadium: Stade Ibn Batouta; Referee: Abderrahim Yagoubi

== Awards ==
Name	Position	Award	Ref.
IR Tanger		Botola's Best Club of the Season (2017–18)	
(Morocco) Ahmed Hammoudan	Forward	Botola's Best Player of the Season (2017–18)	
(Morocco) Driss El Mrabet	Coach	Botola's Best Manager of the Season (2017–18)	

== See also ==
2015–16 IR Tanger season
2016–17 IR Tanger season
