= 2018–19 Botola Pro =

Moroccan football league season

Botola Maroc Telecom
- Season: 2018–19
- Champions: Wydad AC; 20th title
- Relegated: KAC Marrakesh; CR Al Hoceima
- Champions League: Wydad AC; Raja CA
- Confederation Cup: HUS Agadir; RS Berkane
- Matches: 240
- Goals: 550 (2.29 per match)
- Top goalscorer: Mouhcine Iajour, Kodjo Fo-Doh Laba (19 goals)
- Biggest home win: Raja CA 6–0 CR Al Hoceima (25 August 2018)
- Biggest away win: RS Berkane 3–7 Raja CA (13 March 2019)
- Highest scoring: RS Berkane 3–7 Raja CA (13 March 2019)
- Longest winning run: 7 matches Wydad AC
- Longest unbeaten run: 10 matches Wydad AC; Raja CA
- Longest winless run: 11 matches KAC Marrakesh; MA Tétouan; CR Al Hoceima; AS FAR
- Longest losing run: 4 matches CR Al Hoceima; KAC Marrakesh

The 2018–19 Botola, also known as Botola Maroc Telecom for sponsorship reasons, is the 62nd season of the Premier League and the 8th under its new format of Moroccan Pro League, the top Moroccan professional league for association football clubs, since its establishment in 1956. The season started on 25 August 2018 and ended on 15 May 2019.

IR Tanger came into the season as defending champions of the 2017–18 season. Mouloudia Oujda and Youssoufia Berrechid entered as the two promoted teams from the 2017–18 Botola 2.

== Teams ==
=== Stadium and locations ===
Locations of the 2018–19 Botola teams

Team	Location	Stadium	Capacity
AS FAR	Rabat	Stade Moulay Abdellah	53,000
Chabab Rif Al Hoceima	Al Hoceima	Stade Mimoun Al Arsi	12,000
Difaâ El Jadidi	El Jadida	Stade El Abdi	15,000
Fath Union Sport	Rabat	Stade de FUS	15,000
Hassania Agadir	Agadir	Stade Adrar	45,000
IR Tanger	Tangier	Grand Stade de Tanger	45,000
Kawkab Marrakech	Marrakesh	Stade de Marrakech	45,000
Moghreb Tétouan	Tétouan	Saniat Rmel	15,000
RSB Berkane	Berkane	Stade Municipal	30,000
Mouloudia Oujda	Oujda	Honneur Stadium	35,000
Olympic Safi	Safi	Stade El Massira	10,000
Olympique Khouribga	Khouribga	Complexe OCP	10,000
Raja Casablanca	Casablanca	Stade Mohamed V	67,000
Rapide Oued Zem	Oued Zem	Stade Municipal	3,000
Wydad Athletic Club	Casablanca	Stade Mohamed V	67,000
Youssoufia Berrechid	Berrechid	Stade Municipal	5,000

=== Personnel and kits ===
Teams	Managers	Kit manufacturer	Shirt sponsor
Association sportive des FAR	(Spain) Carlos Alós Ferrer	Joma	
Chabab Rif Al Hoceima	(Morocco) Saïd Chiba	Bang Sports	Al Omrane, CGI
Difaâ El Jadidi	(Morocco) Ezzaki Badou	Bang Sports	innjoo, Radio Mars, TGCC^{1}
FUS Rabat	(Morocco) Walid Regragui	Uhlsport	Emaar, Novec^{1}, LafargeHolcim^{2}^{3}
Hassania Agadir	(Argentina) Miguel Ángel Gamondi	Uhlsport	Afriquia, Skoda^{1}, Souss-Massa^{2}, Joly^{3}
IR Tanger	(Morocco) Abdelouahed Belqassem	Gloria sport	Moroccan Airports Authority, Renault, APM Terminals, Tanger-Med, Valencia^{1}, STG telecom^{2}, RCI Finance Maroc^{3}
Kawkab Marrakesh	(Morocco) Azedine Benis	Puma	Poste Maroc, Sanad, CitySport, Menara Mall^{1}
Moghreb Tétouan	(Morocco) Tarik Sektioui	Legea	Halib Tetaouen, Al Omrane^{1}, Radio Mars
Mouloudia Oujda	(Morocco) Abdelaziz Kerkache	Bang Sports	
OC Khouribga	(Morocco) Rachid Taoussi	Bang Sports	OCP
Olympic Safi	(Morocco) Hicham Dmii	Uhlsport	Fitco
Raja Casablanca	(France) Patrice Carteron	Legea	Siera, Nor'Dar, Prodec, Infinix, Hyundai^{1}, Or Blanc^{1}, MarsaMaroc^{2}^{3}, Atlanta Assurances^{2}^{3}
Rapide Oued Zem	(Morocco) Hassan Benabicha	Bang Sports	Morih
RSB Berkane	(Morocco) Mounir Jaouani	Bang Sports	Souiri, Afriquia^{1}
Wydad Casablanca	(Tunisia) Faouzi Benzarti	Macron	Ingelec, Alitkane^{2}, Koutoubia^{2}
Youssoufia Berrechid	(Morocco) Said Seddiki	Bang Sports	Dalaa

1. On the back of shirt.
2. On the sleeves.
3. On the shorts.

- Maroc Telecom is a sponsor for all the league's teams.
- Additionally, referee kits are made by Adidas.

=== Managerial changes ===
Teams	Outgoing manager	Manner of departure	Date of vacancy	Incoming manager	Date of appointment
AS FAR	(Morocco) Abderrazak Khairi	End of contract	20 May 2018	(Morocco) Mohamed Fakhir	21 May 2018
Olympic Safi	(Morocco) Mohamed Amine Benhachem	End of contract	30 May 2018	(Morocco) Hicham Dmii	9 June 2018
OC Khouribga	(France) Bernard Simondi	End of contract	30 June 2018	(Morocco) Mohamed Amine Benhachem	3 July 2018
Chabab Rif Al Hoceima	(Algeria) Nacer Sandjak	End of contract	30 June 2018	(Morocco) Mimoun Ouaali	25 July 2018
Wydad Casablanca	(Tunisia) Faouzi Benzarti	Contract termination	28 July 2018	(Morocco) Abdelhadi Sektioui	3 August 2018
Chabab Rif Al Hoceima	(Morocco) Mimoun Ouaali	Sacked	7 September 2018	(Spain) Juan Pedro Benali	13 September 2018
IR Tanger	(Morocco) Driss El Mrabet	Contract termination	25 September 2018	(Tunisia) Ahmad Al-Ajlani	25 September 2018
Wydad Casablanca	(Morocco) Abdelhadi Sektioui	Contract termination	25 September 2018	(France) René Girard	29 September 2018
Difaâ El Jadidi	(Morocco) Abderrahim Talib	Resigned	26 October 2018	(France) Hubert Velud	30 October 2018
Wydad Casablanca	(France) René Girard	Resigned	23 November 2018	(Tunisia) Faouzi Benzarti	27 November 2018
AS FAR	(Morocco) Mohamed Fakhir	Contract termination	7 December 2018	(Morocco) Mouhcine Bouhlal (interim)	11 December 2018
IR Tanger	(Tunisia) Ahmad Al-Ajlani	Contract termination	25 December 2018	(Morocco) Abdelouahed Belqassem	25 December 2018
Kawkab Marrakesh	(Morocco) Faouzi Jamal	Contract termination	26 December 2018	(Morocco) Aziz El Amri	26 December 2018
AS FAR	(Morocco) Mouhcine Bouhlal (interim)	End of tenure as caretaker	21 January 2019	(Spain) Carlos Alós Ferrer	21 January 2019
Raja Casablanca	(Spain) Juan Carlos Garrido	Contract termination	28 January 2019	(France) Patrice Carteron	30 January 2019
OC Khouribga	(Morocco) Mohamed Amine Benhachem	Sacked	28 January 2019	(Morocco) Rachid Taoussi	29 January 2019
Moghreb Tétouan	(Morocco) Abdelouahed Benhsain	Sacked	9 February 2019	(Morocco) Tarik Sektioui	11 February 2019
Difaâ El Jadidi	(France) Hubert Velud	Sacked	10 February 2019	(Morocco) Ezzaki Badou	11 February 2019
Kawkab Marrakesh	(Morocco) Aziz El Amri	Sacked	18 February 2019	(Morocco) Azedine Benis (interim)	18 February 2019
Rapide Oued Zem	(Egypt) Tarek Mostafa	Contract termination	25 February 2019	(Morocco) Hassan Benabicha	1 March 2019
Kawkab Marrakesh	(Morocco) Azedine Benis (interim)	End of tenure as caretaker	12 March 2019	(Morocco) Jawad Milani	12 March 2019
Kawkab Marrakesh	(Morocco) Jawad Milani	End of tenure as caretaker	12 March 2019	(Morocco) Azedine Benis	12 March 2019
Chabab Rif Al Hoceima	(Spain) Juan Pedro Benali	Contract termination	5 April 2019	(Morocco) Saïd Chiba	7 April 2019

== League table ==
Pos	Team	Pld	W	D	L	GF	GA	GD	Pts	Qualification or relegation
1	Wydad Casablanca (C)	30	17	8	5	56	30	+26	59	Qualification for Champions League
2	Raja Casablanca	30	15	10	5	56	36	+20	55	Qualification for Champions League
3	Hassania Agadir	30	12	9	9	30	22	+8	45 (Note: Head-to-head: Hassania Agadir: 3 points, +2 GD; Olympic Safi: 3 points, −2 GD.)	Qualification for Confederation Cup
4	Olympic Safi	30	12	9	9	37	38	−1	45	Participation in Arab Club Champions Cup (Note: Wydad Casablanca and Raja Casablanca are also participated in the Arab Club Champions Cup.)
5	IR Tanger	30	9	13	8	27	30	−3	40	Participation in Arab Club Champions Cup
6	Youssoufia Berrechid	30	10	9	11	36	37	−1	39 (Note: Head-to-head: Youssoufia Berrechid: 7 points, RS Berkane 5 points, Difaâ El Jadidi 3 points.)	
7	RSB Berkane	30	8	15	7	34	34	0	39	Qualification for Confederation Cup (Note: RS Berkane are Moroccan Throne Cup winners.)
8	Difaâ El Jadidi	30	9	12	9	30	32	−2	39	
9	FUS Rabat	30	8	14	8	25	25	0	38	
10	Rapide Oued Zem	30	7	16	7	28	31	−3	37	
11	Olympique Khouribga	30	8	12	10	38	42	−4	36	
12	Mouloudia Oujda	30	8	11	11	31	38	−7	35	
13	Moghreb Tétouan	30	8	10	12	29	32	−3	34	
14	AS FAR	30	7	12	11	32	32	0	33	
15	Kawkab Marrakesh (R)	30	7	9	14	34	40	−6	30	Relegation to Botola 2
16	Chabab Rif Al Hoceima (R)	30	6	9	15	27	51	−24	27	Relegation to Botola 2

Source: frmf.ma
Rules for classification: 1) Points; 2) Head-to-head points; 3) Head-to-head goal difference; 4) Goal difference; 5) Goals scored; 6) Fair-play points; 7) Play-off.
(C) Champions; (R) Relegated

== Results ==
Home \ Away	WAC	RCA	HUSA	OCS	IRT	CAYB	RSB	DHJ	FUS	RCOZ	OCK	MCO	MAT	FAR	KACM	CRA
Wydad AC	—	2–2	2–1	1–0	2–2	3–2	0–0	3–0	3–0	3–0	4–1	2–0	2–1	1–0	3–1	6–1
Raja CA	0–1	—	2–1	1–0	1–0	3–3	1–1	2–0	0–0	3–2	2–3	2–1	1–1	2–1	2–0	6–0
HUS Agadir	2–1	0–0	—	3–0	0–1	1–1	3–2	0–0	0–0	0–0	1–0	1–0	1–0	1–2	5–1	1–0
OC Safi	2–1	0–1	2–1	—	1–0	0–3	3–0	3–2	3–3	1–0	1–1	1–3	1–0	1–0	1–0	1–1
IR Tanger	1–0	1–1	1–0	0–2	—	1–0	0–0	0–2	1–3	1–1	0–0	3–2	1–1	0–0	1–1	1–1
CAY Berrechid	1–2	1–2	1–0	2–1	1–2	—	1–0	1–1	0–0	1–1	2–0	1–1	2–0	0–0	2–0	1–2
RS Berkane	3–2	3–7	0–0	3–2	2–0	2–0	—	1–1	0–0	2–2	1–1	1–1	2–0	2–1	1–1	2–0
DH Jadidi	1–1	2–4	1–1	0–0	1–0	0–1	1–1	—	1–2	2–0	2–1	1–0	2–0	1–3	1–1	1–0
Fath US	0–1	1–0	2–0	3–0	0–2	1–1	0–0	0–0	—	1–1	2–1	0–1	0–1	1–0	1–0	0–0
RC Oued Zem	0–0	3–3	0–1	1–1	0–1	2–0	2–1	1–1	1–0	—	1–0	1–1	1–0	1–1	1–0	1–0
OC Khouribga	0–1	1–1	0–0	4–4	1–1	1–1	2–2	2–1	2–2	2–2	—	3–1	2–1	1–1	1–0	2–1
MC Oujda	2–3	1–1	1–1	0–0	1–1	0–1	1–0	1–2	3–2	0–0	1–0	—	1–0	1–1	2–1	1–0
MA Tétouan	1–1	3–1	1–2	0–0	1–1	2–0	1–0	0–0	0–0	1–1	0–2	4–1	—	0–0	1–4	2–1
AS FAR	1–1	2–1	0–1	2–3	0–0	3–4	1–1	0–1	2–0	0–0	3–2	1–1	0–2	—	0–2	3–0
KAC Marrakesh	3–3	1–2	0–2	1–2	3–1	4–1	0–0	2–1	1–1	2–0	0–1	3–1	1–1	0–0	—	1–1
CR Al Hoceima	2–1	1–2	1–0	1–1	2–3	2–1	0–1	1–1	0–0	2–2	3–1	1–1	1–4	1–4	1–0	—

Updated to match(es) played on 11 June 2019. Source: Goalzz
Legend: Blue = home team win; Yellow = draw; Red = away team win.
For upcoming matches, an "a" indicates there is an article about the rivalry between the two participants.

== Season statistics ==
=== Top goalscorers ===
As of 11 June 2019.

Rank	Player	Club	Goals
1	(Morocco) Mouhcine Iajour	Raja CA	19
1	(Togo) Kodjo Fo-Doh Laba	RS Berkane	19
3	(Ivory Coast) Koffi Boua	OC Safi	14
4	(Tanzania) Simon Msuva	DH Jadidi	13
5	(Morocco) Khalid Hachadi	OC Khouribga	12
6	(Morocco) Reda Hajhouj	OC Khouribga	11
7	(Mali) N'Tji Amadou Samake	KAC Marrakesh	10
8	(Morocco) Mehdi Naghmi	IR Tanger	9
9	(Morocco) Zakaria Hadraf	Raja CA	8
9	(Mali) Abdoulaye Diarra	RC Oued Zem	8
9	(Nigeria) Michael Babatunde	Wydad AC	8

=== Hat-tricks ===
Player	For	Against	Result	Date	Round
(Morocco) Mouhssine Iajour	Raja CA	DH Jadidi	4–2 (A)	30 January 2019	15
(Ivory Coast) Koffi Boua	OC Safi	DH Jadidi	3–2 (H)	9 March 2019	21
(Morocco) Zakaria Hadraf	Raja CA	RS Berkane	7–3 (A)	13 March 2019	21
(Morocco) Reda Hajhouj	OC Khouribga	OC Safi	4–4 (H)	27 April 2019	26

(H) – Home; (A) – Away

== Annual awards ==
The UMFP (Union Marocaine des Footballeurs Professionnels), in partnership with the Royal Moroccan Football Federation, organized the Night of Stars Award in its 5th edition, which celebrated the brilliants of the Botola Pro for the 2018/19 season.

Award	Winner	Club
Manager of the Season	(Tunisia) Faouzi Benzarti	Wydad AC
Player of the Season	(Morocco) Mohamed Aziz	RS Berkane
Foreign Player of the Season	(Togo) Kodjo Fo-Doh Laba	RS Berkane
Promising Player of the Season	(Morocco) Soufiane Karkache	MC Oujda
Goalkeeper of the Season	(Morocco) Ahmed Reda Tagnaouti	Wydad AC

== Attendances ==
#	Football club	Average attendance
1	IR Tanger	17,877
2	Wydad AC	17,393
3	AS FAR	15,700
4	Raja CA	15,038
5	Hassania Agadir	10,970
6	Olympique Safi	10,284
7	MA Tétouan	9,727
8	KACM	9,433
9	Olympique Khouribga	8,130
10	RC Oued Zem	6,573
11	DHJ	5,750
12	MC Oujda	5,664
13	CRA	5,281
14	Youssoufia Berrechid	5,125
15	RS Berkane	4,700
16	Fath Union Sport	3,533

== See also ==
- 2018 Moroccan Throne Cup
- 2018–19 Botola 2
- 2018-19 CAF Champions League
- 2018-19 CAF Confederation Cup
- 2018–19 Arab Club Champions Cup
