= Ousseynou Thioune =

Senegalese footballer

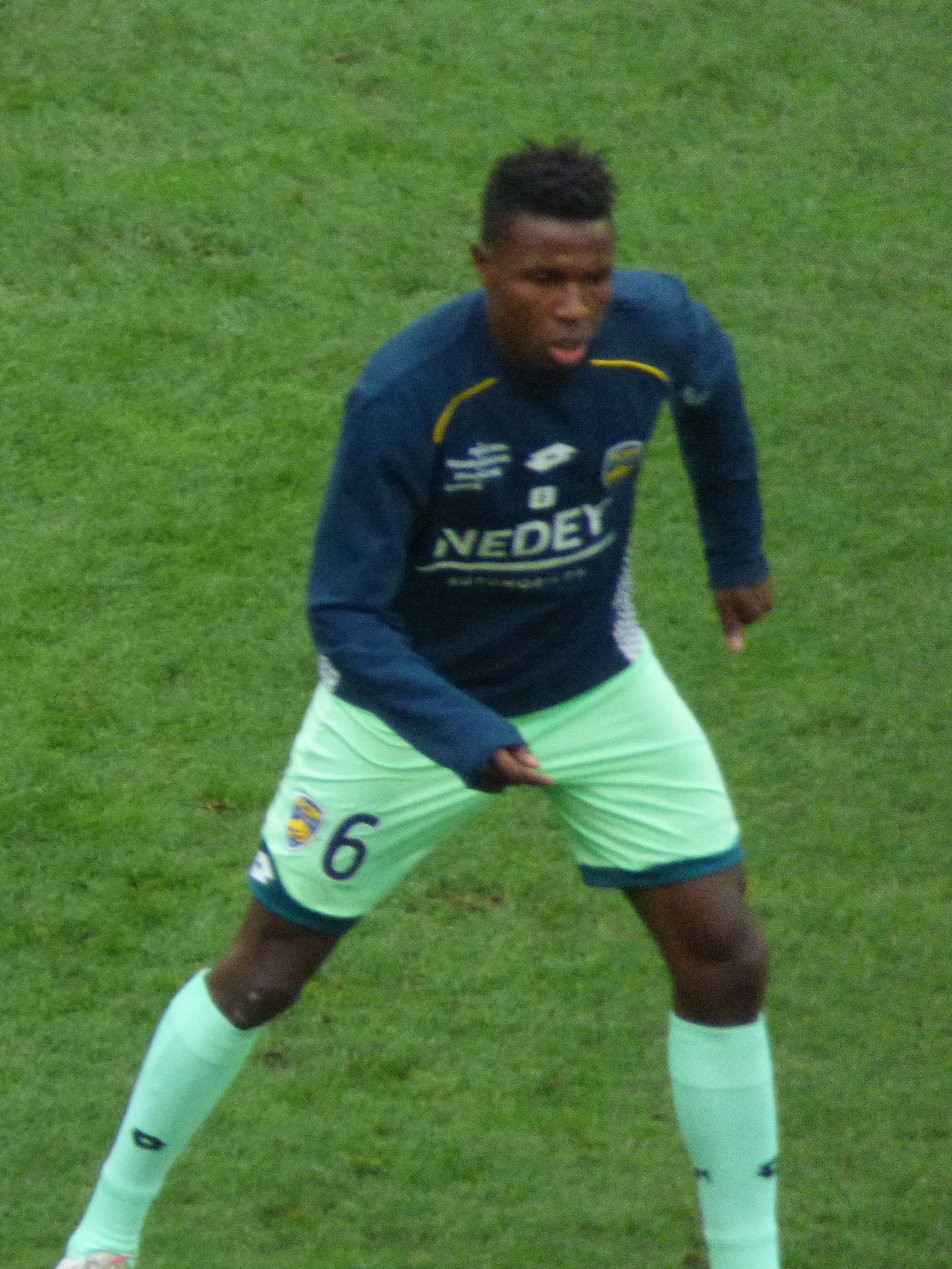
- Thioune in 2019

Personal information
- Full name: Ousseynou Thioune
- Date of birth: 16 November 1993 (age 32)
- Place of birth: Dakar, Senegal
- Height: 1.80 m (5 ft 11 in)
- Position: Defensive midfielder

Senior career*
Years	Team	Apps	(Gls)
2009–2016	Diambars		
2016–2018	Ittihad Tanger	55	(0)
2019	Gimnàstic	18	(0)
2019–2022	Sochaux	89	(1)
2022–2023	Dijon	28	(0)
2023–2024	Anorthosis Famagusta	24	(1)
2025	Al-Minaa	15	(0)
2025–2026	Al-Jubail	25	(0)

International career
2015	Senegal U23	4	(0)
2014–2016	Senegal	6	(0)
- * Club domestic league appearances and goals as of 25 June 2025

Ousseynou Thioune (born 16 November 1993) is a Senegalese professional footballer who plays as a defensive midfielder. Between 2014 and 2016, he made six appearances for the Senegal national team.

== Club career ==
Born in Dakar, Thioune started his career with Diambars. He took part of the club's Ligue 2 winning campaign in 2011, as well in their Premier League and League Cup accolades in 2013 and 2016, respectively.

Thioune joined Botola's Ittihad Tanger in August 2016. He made his professional debut late in the month, stating in a 4–1 home routing of Difaa El Jadida. He was among the squad during the 2017–18 season which was crowned champions for the first time ever.

On 18 December 2018, Thioune agreed to a six-month contract with Segunda División side Gimnàstic de Tarragona.

In July 2019 he signed for French club Sochaux.

On 15 July 2022, Thioune signed a two-year contract with Dijon. He moved to Anorthosis Famagusta in August 2023.

In 2025 he signed for Iraq Stars League club Al-Minaa. His contract expired on 30 June 2025 and was not renewed with the club.

On 10 September 2025, Thioune joined Saudi FDL club Al-Jubail.

== International career ==
Thioune made his full international debut for Senegal on 31 May 2014, coming on as a second-half substitute for Dame Diop in a 2–2 friendly draw against Colombia at the Estadio Pedro Bidegain in Buenos Aires, Argentina. Called up by the under-23 side for the 2015 Africa U-23 Cup of Nations held in his homeland, he was an undisputed starter until the semifinals, when he was sent off for handballing inside the box in a match against Nigeria; the visitors won the match 1–0.

== Personal life ==
Thioune's elder brother Mame Saher is also a footballer. A central defender, both played together at Ittihad Tanger in 2017.

== Career statistics ==
=== Club ===
As of match played 25 June 2025

Appearances and goals by club, season and competition
Club	Season	League			Cup		Continental		Other		Total	
Club	Season	Division	Apps	Goals	Apps	Goals	Apps	Goals	Apps	Goals	Apps	Goals
Ittihad Tanger	2016–17	Botola	26	0	6	0	4	0	—		36	0
Ittihad Tanger	2017–18	Botola	23	0	3	0	—		—		26	0
Ittihad Tanger	2018–19	Botola	6	0	2	0	—		—		8	0
Ittihad Tanger	Total	Botola	55	0	11	0	4	0	0	0	70	0
Gimnàstic	2018–19	Segunda División	18	0	—		—		—		18	0
Sochaux	2019–20	Ligue 2	21	0	1	0	—		—		22	0
Sochaux	2020–21	Ligue 2	30	0	1	0	—		—		31	0
Sochaux	2021–22	Ligue 2	38	1	1	0	—		—		39	1
Sochaux	Total		89	0	3	0	0	0	—		92	1
Dijon	2022–23	Ligue 2	28	0	—		—		—		28	0
Anorthosis	2023–24	Cypriot First Division	2	0	0	0	—		—		2	0
Al-Minaa	2024–25	Iraq Stars League	15	0	1	0	—		—		16	0
Career total			207	1	15	0	4	0	0	0	226	1

=== International ===
As of 18 November 2018

Appearances and goals by national team and year
National team	Year	Apps	Goals
Senegal	2014	1	0
Senegal	2015	4	0
Senegal	2016	1	0
Total		6	0

== Honours ==
Diambars

- Senegal Premier League: 2013
- Senegalese Super Cup: 2011, 2012, 2013
- Senegalese League Cup: 2016
- Senegal Ligue 2: 2011

Ittihad Tanger

- Botola: 2017–18

Senegal U23

- African Games: 2015
