= Nawfel Zerhouni =

Moroccan footballer (born 1995)

Personal information
- Date of birth: 14 September 1995 (age 31)
- Place of birth: Taounate, Morocco
- Height: 1.74 m (5 ft 9 in)
- Positions: Right winger; attacking midfielder

Team information
- Current team: Al Ittihad
- Number: 10

Youth career
- 2006-2015: Raja CA

Senior career*
Years	Team	Apps	(Gls)
2015–2016	Raja CA	3	(0)
2015–2016	→ Youssoufia Berrechid (loan)	15	(2)
2016–2017	Rapide Oued Zem	25	(6)
2017–2022	FUS Rabat	100	(18)
2022–2023	Al-Hazem	26	(4)
2022–2023	→ Raja CA (loan)	22	(3)
2023–2025	Raja CA	59	(13)
2025–	Al Ittihad	28	(11)

International career^{‡}
2018–	Morocco A'	2	(0)
Medal record
Representing Morocco
African Nations Championship
Winner	2018 Morocco
- * Club domestic league appearances and goals as of 11 March 2026 ‡ National team caps and goals as of 20 March 2024

Nawfel Zerhouni (Arabic: نوفل الزرهوني; born 14 September 1995) is a Moroccan professional footballer who plays as a right winger or attacking midfielder for Libyan Premier League club Al Ittihad, and the Morocco A' national team.

He began his football career by joining Raja Club Athletic training center at the Oasis Complex when he was 10 years old. In 2015, he joined the first team but did not establish himself and went on loan to Youssoufia Berrechid. The following year, he signed for RC Oued Zem where he won the 2016–17 Botola 2. He was then signed by Fath Union Sports where he played for four and a half years. In 2022, flies to Saudi Arabia to sign with Al-Hazm. In January 2023, he finally returned to Raja CA.

== Club career ==
Nawfel Zerhouni was born on 14 September 1995 in Casablanca, and joined his favorite club academy at Raja-Oasis Complex at the age of 11.

In 2015, he reached Raja CA first team, then in a very difficult situation after eliminations in Champions League and Confederation Cup. José Romão was sacked before the end of the season and interim coach Fathi Jamal offered Zerhouni his first minutes.

On 10 May 2015, he made his debut and played 90 minutes against Chabib Rif Al Hoceima (2–1 defeat). He will play two other matches against RS Berkane and CA Khenifra. Raja finished one of the worst seasons in the 8th position with only one victory in the last thirteen games.

During this summer, he joined Youssoufia Berrechid on a season loan until the end of the 2015–16 season. In July 2016, he moved to RC Oued Zem where he became a key-player in Mohamed Bekkari's squad and helped the team win the 2016–17 Botola 2 to secure promotion.

In July 2017, he joined Fath Union Sports and took part in the 2017 Arab Club Championship.

On 6 January 2022, Zerhouni joined Saudi club Al-Hazem on a one-and-a-half-year deal, despite being heavily linked to his former club Raja CA.

On 23 January 2023, he finally joined Raja on a six-month loan deal.

On 22 February, he made his first appearance against US Touarga. On February 26, he scored his first Raja goal against Horoya AC in the Champions League and allowed Raja to secure their third consecutive group stage win (2–0). In the 2023 summer, after the 2022 Throne cup final, he signed a definitive contract with his club.

On 28 December, he scored his first hat-trick against Ittihad Tanger in Botola (6–1 win).

== International career ==
In October 2018, he was called up by Jamal Sellami with the Morocco A' team, for two friendly matches in Spain. During this training, Nawfel Zerhouni scored a goal.

In October 2020, the player tested positive for COVID-19 and withdrew from two preparation matches against Mali A' and Niger A'.

In January 2021, he was selected by Houcine Ammouta to play in the 2020 African Nations Championship in Cameroon. Nawfel Zerhouni started in the second match against Rwanda A'. Tha Atlas Lions won competition after a victory against Mali in the final (2–0).

== Honours ==
Raja CA

- Botola: 2023–24
- Coupe du Trône: 2023

RC Oued Zem

- Botola 2: 2016-17

Morocco

- African Nations Championship: 2020
