= Ahmed Hammoudan =

Moroccan footballer

Personal information
- Date of birth: 12 July 1991 (age 35)
- Place of birth: Chefchaouen, Morocco
- Height: 1.74 m (5 ft 9 in)
- Position: Winger

Team information
- Current team: AS FAR
- Number: 27

Youth career
- –: Tihad Chefchaouen
- –: Estudiantes Tetuán
- –2012: FC Tétouan

Senior career*
Years	Team	Apps	(Gls)
2012–2022	IR Tanger	102+	(31)
2018–2019	→ Al-Raed (loan)	29	(4)
2019–2020	→ Al-Khor (loan)	22	(6)
2020–2021	→ Al-Sailiya (loan)	7	(1)
2021	→ Umm Salal (loan)	10	(1)
2022–	AS FAR	22	(5)

International career^{‡}
2015–2018	Morocco local	7	(3)
- * Club domestic league appearances and goals as of 23 June 2023 ‡ National team caps and goals as of 4 February 2018

Ahmed Hammoudan (born 12 April 1991 in Chefchaouen) is a Moroccan footballer who plays for AS FAR as a winger.

== Career statistics ==
=== Club ===
As of matches played 23 June 2023

Appearances and goals by club, season and competition
Club	Season	League			Cups		Continental		Others		Total	
Club	Season	Division	Apps	Goals	Apps	Goals	Apps	Goals	Apps	Goals	Apps	Goals
IR Tanger	2012–13	Botola 2	?	?	?	0	–		–		?	?
IR Tanger	2013–14	Botola 2	?	12	?	0	–		–		?	12
IR Tanger	2014–15	Botola 2	?	3	?	1	–		–		?	4
IR Tanger	2015–16	Botola	27	2	6	0	–		–		33	2
IR Tanger	2016–17	Botola	25	6	5	0	6 (Note: Appearances in CAF Confederation Cup)	3	–		36	9
IR Tanger	2017–18	Botola	29	4	4	0	–		–		33	4
IR Tanger	2021–22	Botola	21	4	2	0	–		–		23	4
IR Tanger	Total		102+	31	17+	1	6	3	0	0	125+	35
Al-Raed FC (loan)	2018–19	Saudi Professional League	29	4	0	0	–		–		29	4
Al-Khor SC (loan)	2019–20	Qatar Stars League	22	6	4 (Note: Appearances in Qatari Stars Cup)	0	–		1 (Note: Appearance in Qatar Stars League Relegation)	1	27	7
Al-Sailiya SC (loan)	2020–21	Qatar Stars League	7	1	5	2	–		–		12	3
Umm Salal SC (loan)	2020–21	Qatar Stars League	10	1	4 (Note: One Appearance in Emir of Qatar Cup, three appearances and three goals in Qatar FA Cup)	3	–		–		14	4
AS FAR	2022–23	Botola	22	5	2	0	11	2	3 (Note: Appearances in Arab Club Champions Cup)	1	38	8
Career total			192+	48	32+	6	17	5	4	2	246+	61

== Honours ==
Moroccan Local

- African Nations Championship: 2018

IR Tanger

- Botola: 2017–18
- Botola 2: 2014–15

AS FAR

- Botola: 2022–23

Al-Sailiya SC

- Qatari Stars Cup: 2020–21

Individual

- Botola Best Player of the Season: 2017–18.
- Botola Best Promising Player of the Season: 2016–17.
