= Noussair El Maimouni =

Moroccan footballer (born 1991)

Personal information
- Full name: Noussair El Maimouni
- Date of birth: 20 February 1991 (age 35)
- Place of birth: Tétouan, Morocco
- Height: 1.83 m (6 ft 0 in)
- Position: Midfielder

Senior career*
Years	Team	Apps	(Gls)
2010–2017	Moghreb Tétouan	126	(2)
2017–2018	Ittihad Tanger	8	(0)
2018	→ Moghreb Tétouan (loan)	13	(1)
2018	ATK	10	(1)
2019	Moghreb Tétouan	14	(1)
2020	Mouloudia Oujda	1	(0)

International career
- Morocco U23
- * Club domestic league appearances and goals as of 17:33, 23 August 2020 (UTC)

Noussair El Maimouni (born February 20, 1991) is a Moroccan professional footballer who plays as a midfielder.

== Club career ==
=== Moghreb Tétouan (2010–2017) ===
Born in Tétouan, El Maimouni started his professional career in 2010 with local Moghreb Tétouan. He played with the club for seven years till 2017, amassing more than a hundred caps during his stint. While at the club, he won the league twice (2011–12 and 2013–14) and also played in the 2014 FIFA Club World Cup. In February 2016, he trialled with Spanish club Atlético Madrid and in the following month, reports emerged that he might join the club.

=== Ittihad Tanger (2017–2018) ===
In 2017, he switched to Ittihad Tanger. But after being used sparingly, he returned to his former club in 2018 on a loan deal.

=== ATK (2018) ===
On 13 July 2018, El Maimouni moved abroad and joined the Indian Super League club ATK. He left the club at the end of the year.

=== Moghreb Tétouan (2019) ===
He went back to his former club, Moghreb Tétouan, in January 2019.

== International career ==
El Maimouni has been capped by the under-23 team.

== Career statistics ==
As of 13 July 2018

Club	Season	League			Cup		Other		Total	
Club	Season	Division	Apps	Goals	Apps	Goals	Apps	Goals	Apps	Goals
Moghreb Tétouan	2010–11	Botola	4	0	0	0	—		4	0
Moghreb Tétouan	2011–12	Botola	29	0	0	0	—		29	0
Moghreb Tétouan	2012–13	Botola	6	0	0	0	—		6	0
Moghreb Tétouan	2013–14	Botola	26	0	0	0	—		26	0
Moghreb Tétouan	2014–15	Botola	16	1	0	0	6 (Note: Appearances in CAF Champions League and 1 appeanrance in FIFA Club World Cup)	0	22	1
Moghreb Tétouan	2015–16	Botola	23	1	2	0	5 (Note: Appearances in CAF Champions League)	0	30	1
Moghreb Tétouan	2016–17	Botola	22	0	0	0	—		22	0
Moghreb Tétouan	Total		126	2	2	0	11	0	139	2
Ittihad Tanger	2017–18	Botola	8	0	4	0	—		12	0
Moghreb Tétouan	2017–18	Botola	13	1	0	0	—		13	1
ATK	2018–19	Indian Super League	9	1	0	0	—		9	1
Career total			147	3	5	0	11	0	172	4

== Honours ==
Moghreb Tétouan

- Botola: 2011–12, 2013–14

Ittihad Tanger

- Botola: 2017–18
