= 2015–16 Botola Pro =

Moroccan football league season

Botola
- Season: 2015–16
- Champions: FUS Rabat; 1st title
- Relegated: MC Oujda; Maghreb of Fez
- Champions League: FUS Rabat; Wydad Casablanca
- Confederation Cup: IR Tanger; Maghreb of Fez
- Matches: 240
- Goals: 501 (2.09 per match)
- Top goalscorer: Mehdi Naghmi (12 Goals)
- Biggest home win: HUSA 5–1 KAC; RCA 5–1 HUSA
- Biggest away win: MAT 2–5 RCA; RCA 1–4 FAR; HUSA 2–5 MAS
- Highest scoring: FAR 5–2 MAT; MAT 2–5 RCA; KAC 3–4 MAT; HUSA 2–5 MAS
- Highest attendance: 80,000 (Raja vs Wydad)

The 2015–16 Botola, also known as Botola Maroc Telecom for sponsorship reasons, is the 59th season of the Premier League, the top Moroccan professional league for association football clubs, since its establishment in 1915. The fixtures were announced on 22 July 2015. The season started on 5 September 2015 and is scheduled to conclude on 15 April 2016.

Wydad came into the season as defending champions of the 2014–15 season. IR Tanger and MC Oujda entered as the two promoted teams from the 2014–15 GNF 2.

On June 5, 2016, FUS Rabat won the football championship after a 4–2 victory against Mouloudia D'Oujda. The FUS Rabat club won the championship for the first time after being runner-up to the title for 5 previous times.

== Teams ==
Locations of the 2015–16 Botola teams

A total of 16 teams compete in the league, including 14 sides from the 2014–15 season and two promoted from the 2014–15 GNF 2. On 12 April 2015, Tanger became the first Championship side to be promoted following their 0–0 draw over Youssoufia Berrechid in week 27. On 4 May 2015 (in week 30), MC Oujda got promoted to the top flight after defeating US Temara 1–0 in their home match.

The two promoted clubs replaced Chabab Atlas Khenifra and Ittihad Khemisset.

=== Stadium and locations ===
Team	Acronym	Location	Stadium	Capacity
Chabab Rif Al Hoceima	CRA	Al Hoceima	Stade Mimoun Al Arsi	12,000
Difaâ El Jadidi	DHJ	El Jadida	Stade El Abdi	15,000
AS FAR Club	AS FAR	Rabat	Stade Moulay Abdellah	65,000
Fath Union Sport	FUS	Rabat	Stade de FUS	15,000
Hassania Agadir	HUSA	Agadir	Stade Adrar	45,480
IR Tanger	IRT	Tanger	Grand Stade de Tanger	45,000
KAC Kénitra	KAC	Kenitra	Stade Municipal (Kenitra)	15,000
Kawkab Marrakech	KACM	Marrakesh	Marrakesh Stadium	45,240
MAS Fez	MAS	Fez	Fez Stadium	45,000
Moghreb Tétouan	MAT	Tétouan	Saniat Rmel	15,000
MC Oujda	MCO	Oujda	Honneur Stadium	30,000
Olympic Safi	OCS	Safi	Stade El Massira	10,000
Olympique Khouribga	OCK	Khouribga	Complexe OCP	10,000
Raja Casablanca	RCA	Casablanca	Stade Mohamed V	67,000
RSB Berkane	RSB	Berkane	Stade Municipal	15,000
Wydad Casablanca	WAC	Casablanca	Stade Mohamed V	67,000

=== Personnel and kits ===
Teams	Managers^{1}	Kit manufacturer	Shirt sponsor
Chabab Rif Al Hoceima	(Morocco) Fouad Sahabi		Al Omrane, Koutoubia
Difaâ El Jadidi	(Morocco) Abderrahim Taleb	Uhlsport	OCP, Alitkan
AS FAR Club	(Morocco) Abdelmalek El Aziz	Joma	
FUS Rabat	(Morocco) Walid Regragui	Nike	
Hassania Agadir	(Morocco) Abdelhadi Sektioui	Umbro	Ifriquiya
IR Tanger	(Algeria) Abdelhak Benchikha	Bang Sports	Moroccan Airports Authority
KAC Kénitra	(Morocco) Samir Yaich	Sarsons Sports	Koutoubia
Kawkab Marrakesh	(Morocco) Hassan Benabicha	Adidas	Koutoubia
MAS Fez	(Morocco) Mohammed El Achhabi	M Sport	Ingelec
MC Oujda	(Algeria) Azzedine Aït Djoudi	Joma	
Moghreb Tétouan	(Spain) Sergio Lobera	King Sports Maroc	Abroun
OC Khouribga	(Morocco) Youssef El Mrini	Nike	
Olympic Safi	(Morocco) Hicham Dmii		
Raja Casablanca	(Morocco) Rachid Taoussi	Adidas	Hyundai
RSB Berkane	(France) Bertrand Marchand	Nike	
Wydad Casablanca	(Wales) John Toshack	Adidas	Ingelec

- ^{1} According to current revision of List of Moroccan Football League managers
- Additionally, referee kits are made by Adidas.
- Maroc Telecom is a sponsor for all the league's teams.

=== Managerial changes ===
Teams	Outgoing manager	Manner of departure	Date of vacancy	Incoming manager	Date of appointment
Olympic Safi	(Morocco) Youssef Fertout	Sacked	29 May 2015	(Morocco) Aziz El Amri	29 May 2015
IR Tanger	(Morocco) Mohamed Amine Benhachem	Sacked	2 June 2015	(Algeria) Abdelhak Benchikha	2 June 2015
CR Al Hoceima	(Morocco) Aziz El Amri	Sacked	5 June 2015	(Tunisia) Kamal Zouaghi	5 June 2015
Maghreb of Fez	(Morocco) Rachid Taoussi	Sacked	5 November 2015	(France) Denis Lavagne	14 November 2015
Raja Casablanca	(Netherlands) Ruud Krol	Sacked	5 November 2015	(Morocco) Rachid Taoussi	5 November 2015
CR Al Hoceima	(Tunisia) Kamal Zouaghi	Sacked	28 December 2015	(Morocco) Fouad Sahabi	30 December 2015
Kawkab Marrakesh	(Morocco) Hicham Dmii	Sacked	8 January 2016	(Morocco) Hassan Benabicha	9 January 2016
Difaâ El Jadidi	(Morocco) Jamal Sellami	Sacked	15 February 2016	(Morocco) Abderrahim Taleb	22 February 2016
OC Khouribga	(Tunisia) Ahmad Al-Ajlani	Resigned	9 March 2016	(Tunisia) Karim Zouaghi	9 March 2016
Maghreb of Fez	(France) Denis Lavagne	Sacked	28 March 2016	(Morocco) Mohammed El Achhabi	28 March 2016
AS FAR Club	(Portugal) José Romão	Resigned	1 April 2016	(Morocco) Abdelmalek El Aziz	3 April 2016
Olympic Safi	(Morocco) Aziz El Amri	Sacked	3 April 2016	(Morocco) Hicham Dmii	6 April 2016
OC Khouribga	(Tunisia) Karim Zouaghi	Sacked	19 April 2016	(Morocco) Youssef El Mrini	21 April 2016

== Results ==
=== League table ===
Pos	Team	Pld	W	D	L	GF	GA	GD	Pts	Qualification or relegation
1	FUS Rabat (C)	30	16	10	4	40	21	+19	58	CAF Champions League and the Arab Club Championship
2	Wydad Casablanca	30	16	8	6	34	19	+15	56	Qualification to the CAF Champions League
3	IR Tanger	30	14	8	8	36	23	+13	50	Qualification to the CAF Confederation Cup
4	FAR Rabat	30	13	8	9	40	35	+5	47	
5	Raja Casablanca	30	13	8	9	48	30	+18	47	
6	Moghreb Tétouan	30	12	7	11	34	43	−9	43	
7	RSB Berkane	30	10	13	7	24	19	+5	43	
8	Hassania Agadir	30	11	8	11	44	46	−2	41	
9	Olympic Safi	30	9	10	11	23	27	−4	37	
10	Chabab Rif Hoceima	30	10	6	14	27	34	−7	36	
11	KAC Kénitra	30	10	5	15	26	37	−11	35	
12	Olympique Khouribga	30	9	7	14	26	35	−9	34	
13	Difaâ El Jadidi	30	7	13	10	26	30	−4	34	
14	Kawkab Marrakech	30	7	9	14	23	30	−7	30	
15	MC Oujda (R)	30	7	8	15	26	41	−15	29	Relegation to Botola 2
16	Maghreb of Fez (R)	30	5	14	11	24	31	−7	29	Confederation Cup and relegation to Botola 2 (Note: Despite relegation, Maghreb of Fez qualified for the 2017 CAF Confederation Cup as Coupe du Trône winners)

Updated to match(es) played on 4 June 2016. Source:
Rules for classification: 1) points; 2) goal difference; 3) number of goals scored.
(C) Champions; (R) Relegated

== Result table ==
Home \ Away	FUS	WAC	IRT	FAR	RCA	MAT	RSB	HUSA	OCS	CRA	KAC	OCK	DHJ	KACM	MCO	MAS
FUS Rabat		1–0	2–1	2–3	2–0	2–0	0–0	2–0	3–1	1–1	2–1	1–0	0–0	1–1	4–2	0–0
Wydad	0–1		2–2	4–2	0–0	2–0	1–0	1–2	2–0	0–0	2–0	1–0	2–1	2–0	2–1	3–0
IR Tanger	0–1	3–0		1–0	3–0	2–2	1–0	3–1	0–1	0–2	1–0	2–1	1–0	0–0	3–0	2–0
FAR Rabat	1–1	0–2	1–2		1–0	5–2	0–0	1–4	1–1	2–2	2–1	0–0	3–0	1–0	1–0	1–0
Raja	1–1	3–0	2–2	1–4		2–3	1–0	5–1	0–0	2–1	0–1	1–2	0–1	1–1	4–0	3–0
Moghreb Tétouan	0–3	0–0	1–0	1–1	2–5		1–0	2–4	0–0	1–2	1–0	1–2	1–1	1–0	1–1	1–0
RSB Berkane	0–1	0–0	0–0	2–1	1–1	0–0		1–1	1–0	0–1	1–0	0–0	3–1	2–0	2–1	2–1
Hassania Agadir	1–1	0–1	1–3	1–0	1–1	0–1	0–0		0–0	2–1	5–1	2–0	1–1	1–1	1–0	2–5
OC Safi	0–1	0–1	2–0	2–1	1–0	1–0	1–0	2–4		1–0	1–2	0–1	0–1	1–0	0–0	2–2
CR Hoceima	2–1	0–1	1–0	1–1	0–2	1–2	1–2	0–1	3–2		1–2	1–0	0–0	1–0	1–0	1–1
KAC Kénitra	2–1	0–1	0–0	0–2	0–3	3–4	1–2	3–1	2–1	1–0		2–2	0–0	0–0	0–1	1–0
OC Khouribga	1–2	1–3	1–0	0–1	1–3	0–1	2–2	2–1	0–0	1–0	1–0		1–1	2–1	1–2	0–3
Difaâ El Jadidi	0–0	0–0	1–1	2–3	1–1	1–2	0–1	1–1	0–0	3–0	0–1	1–3		1–0	3–2	2–1
Kawkab Marrakech	0–1	1–0	0–1	3–0	0–2	2–1	0–0	3–2	1–2	2–0	1–2	1–0	1–3		2–0	0–0
MC Oujda	2–1	1–1	1–2	0–0	0–1	1–2	0–0	2–3	1–1	2–3	1–0	1–0	1–0	1–1		0–0
Maghreb of Fez	1–1	0–0	0–0	0–1	0–3	2–0	2–2	2–0	0–0	1–0	0–0	1–1	0–0	1–1	1–2	

Updated to match(es) played on 4 June 2016. Source: Botola Pro
Legend: Blue = home team win; Yellow = draw; Red = away team win.

== Season statistics ==
=== Top scorers ===
As of 4 June 2016.

Rank	Player	Club	Goals
1	(Morocco) Mehdi Naghmi	FAR Rabat	12
2	(Morocco) Mourad Batna	FUS Rabat	11
2	(Morocco) Abdelilah Hafidi	Raja Casablanca	11
4	(Morocco) Reda Hajhouj	Wydad Casablanca	9
4	(Morocco) Achraf Bencharki	Maghreb of Fez	9
6	(Morocco) Zakaria Hadraf	Difaâ El Jadidi	8
7	(Ivory Coast) Hervé Guy	IR Tanger	7
7	(Morocco) Abdessamad El Mobarky	Chabab Rif Al Hoceima	7
7	(Morocco) Badie Aouk	Hassania Agadir	7
7	(Morocco) Yassin Dahbi	MC Oujda	7

=== Hat-tricks ===
Player	For	Against	Result	Date	Ref.
(Morocco) Noureddine El Gourch	Hassania Agadir	Moghreb Tétouan	2–4 (A)	22 September 2015	
(Morocco) Abdelilah Hafidi	Raja Casablanca	Hassania Agadir	5–1 (H)	29 May 2016	
(Morocco) Achraf Bencharki	Maghreb of Fez	Hassania Agadir	2–5 (A)	4 June 2016	

^{4} Player scored four goals
^{5} Player scored five goals
(H) - Home; (A) - Away

== Annual awards ==
The Royal Moroccan Football Federation, in coordination with the LNFP ( Ligue Nationale du Football Professionnel) and the UMFP (Union Marocaine des Footballeurs Professionnels), organized the 2nd edition of the "Stars' Night" in honor of the players and coacheswho were distinguished during the 2015/2016 season.

Award	Winner	Club
Manager of the Season	(Morocco) Walid Regragui	Fath US
Player of the Season	(Morocco) Mourad Batna	Fath US
Promising Player of the Season	(Morocco) Reda Hajhouj	Wydad AC
Foreign Player of the Season	(Nigeria) Michael Babatunde	Raja CA

== Attendances ==
No.	Club	Average
1	IRT	23,572
2	Wydad	20,438
3	Raja	20,167
4	HUSA	11,842
5	AS FAR	10,953
6	MC Oujda	9,276
7	MAS	9,104
8	MAT	8,319
9	Safi	7,482
10	KACM	6,751
11	KAC	6,498
12	Khouribga	5,512
13	Difaâ El-Jadida	5,048
14	FUS	4,489
15	Renaissance de Berkane	3,074
16	Al-Hoceima	2,823

== See also ==
- 2015–16 GNF 2
- 2016 CAF Champions League
- 2016 CAF Confederation Cup
