= 2022–23 ASFAR season =

64th season in existence of AS FAR

ASFAR
2022–23 season
- Chairman: Mohamed Haramou
- Head coach: Fernando Da Cruz
- Stadium: Prince Moulay Abdellah Stadium
- Botola: 1st
- Throne Cup: Round of 16
- CAF Confederation Cup: Group Stage
- Top goalscorer: League: Diney (7); All: Diney (10)
- Biggest win: 5-1 v ASKO Kara; 19 February 2023; 4–0 v Ashanti GB; 9 October 2022; 4–0 v Djoliba; 9 November 2022; 4–0 v IR Tanger; 25 January 2023
- Biggest defeat: 1–0 v FUS; 8 January 2023; 0-1 v Raja Casablanca; 21 January 2023
- All statistics correct as of 28 February 2023.

The 2022–23 season is ASFAR's 63rd successive season in the Botola, and 64th season in existence. In addition to the domestic league, they are participating in this season's Throne Cup, and CAF Confederation Cup.

== Background ==
After finishing 3rd in the 2021–22 Botola campaign, AS FAR secured a spot in the first round of the CAF Confederation Cup. However, in early August, Belgian manager Sven Vandenbroeck left the club to sign for Saudi Arabian club Abha Club. French manager Fernando Da Cruz replaced him one month later.

== Season Squad ==
Squad No.	Name	Nationality	Position(s)	Date of birth (age)
Goalkeepers
1	Mohamed Baayou	(Morocco)	GK	1 November 1993 (age 32)
12	Hassan Doughmi	(Morocco)	GK	10 May 2000 (age 25)
22	Ayoub Lakred	(Morocco)	GK	21 June 1995 (age 30)
Defenders
3	Emmanuel Imanishimwe	(Rwanda)	LB	2 February 1995 (age 31)
4	Dhiaeddine Jouini	(Tunisia)	CB	1 March 1996 (age 30)
5	Bakary Mané	(Senegal)	CB	26 July 1994 (age 31)
15	Hatim Es-Saoubi	(Morocco)	CB	13 December 1998 (age 27)
19	Anouar Tarkhatt	(Morocco)	LB	5 September 1995 (age 30)
23	Diney Borges (VC)	(Cape Verde)	CB	17 January 1995 (age 31)
29	Mohamed Moufid	(Morocco)	RB	12 January 2000 (age 26)
Midfielders
6	Zineddine Derrag	(Morocco)	DM / CM	29 January 1999 (age 27)
8	Brahim Sabaouni	(Morocco)	DM / CM	13 May 1994 (age 31)
13	Larbi Naji	(Morocco)	DM	12 December 1990 (age 35)
24	Soulaimane El Bouchqali	(Morocco)	CM	2 February 2003 (age 23)
34	Mohamed Rabie Hrimat (C)	(Morocco)	DM / CM	7 August 1994 (age 31)
40	Abdelfattah Hadraf	(Morocco)	CM / AM	22 March 1998 (age 28)
Forwards
7	Reda Slim	(Morocco)	LW / RW	25 October 1999 (age 26)
10	Zakaria Fati	(Morocco)	LW / RW / AM	6 September 1992 (age 33)
14	Joseph Guédé Gnadou	(Ivory Coast)	ST	28 August 1994 (age 31)
18	Lambert Araina	(Cameroon)	ST	7 September 1998 (age 27)
20	Hamza Igamane	(Morocco)	ST	21 May 2001 (age 24)
27	Ahmed Hammoudan	(Morocco)	RW / LW	12 July 1991 (age 34)
31	Mustapha Sahd	(Morocco)	ST	24 August 1993 (age 32)
33	Lamine Diakite	(Ivory Coast)	RW / LW	15 June 1991 (age 34)
77	Adam Ennafati	(Morocco)	RW / LW	29 June 1994 (age 31)
Out on loan
11	Mohamed El Khaloui	(Morocco)	LW / RW / AM	25 April 1998 (age 27)

Last updated: 28 February 2023.
Source: ,

== Transfers ==
=== Loans out ===
Date from	Position	Nationality	Player	To	Date until	Ref.
11 January 2023	LW	(Morocco)	Mohamed El Khaloui	(Morocco) UTS	June 2023	

=== Transfers in ===
Date from	Position	Nationality	Player	From	Fee	Ref.
30 June 2022	ST	(Ivory Coast)	Joseph Guédé Gnadou	(United Arab Emirates) Emirates Club	Loan return	
30 June 2022	LW	(Morocco)	Khalid Aït Ouarkhane	(Morocco) Raja Beni Mellal	Loan return	
30 June 2022	RB	(Morocco)	Reda Mhannaoui	(Morocco) TAS Casablanca	Loan return	
30 June 2022	LB	(Morocco)	Mohamed El Mahdi Barkaoui	(Morocco) TAS Casablanca	Loan return	
30 June 2022	ST	(Morocco)	Mohssine Abba	(Morocco) Stade Marocain	Loan return	
20 July 2022	LW	(Morocco)	Ahmed Hammoudan	(Morocco) Ittihad Tanger	Free	
4 August 2022	LW	(Morocco)	Adam Ennafati	(United Arab Emirates) Emirates Club	Unknown	
8 August 2022	CM	(Morocco)	Zineddine Derrag	(Morocco) Olympique Khouribga	€172,000	
8 August 2022	CB	(Morocco)	Ayoub Assout	(Morocco) Union Imzouren	Undisclosed	
9 August 2022	CB	(Tunisia)	Dhiaeddine Jouini	(Tunisia) Olympique Béja	€62,000	
9 August 2022	DM	(Morocco)	Larbi Naji	(Morocco) RS Berkane	Free	
23 August 2022	GK	(Morocco)	Ayoub Boulbir	(Morocco) Stade Marocain	Undisclosed	
9 September 2022	RW	(Ivory Coast)	Lamine Diakite	(Kuwait) Al-Arabi	Undisclosed	
