= Nacer Sandjak =

French footballer (born 1953)

Personal information
- Date of birth: 2 July 1953 (age 73)
- Place of birth: Paris, France
- Positions: Midfielder; forward

Senior career*
Years	Team	Apps	(Gls)
1977–1981	Romainville		
1981–1982	Chatillon-sur-Seine		
1982–1997	Noisy-le-Sec		

Managerial career
- 1994–2000: Noisy-le-Sec
- 2000: Algeria
- 2000–2003: Noisy-le-Sec
- 2003: JS Kabylie
- 2003–2009: Noisy-le-Sec
- 2012–2013: JS Kabylie
- 2013–2016: Noisy-le-Sec
- 2016–2017: MO Béjaïa
- 2018: Chabab Rif Al Hoceima
- * Club domestic league appearances and goals

Nacer Sandjak (born 2 July 1953) is a French football manager and former player.

== Career ==
Born in Paris, Sandjak played club football in France for Romainville, Chatillon-sur-Seine and Noisy-le-Sec, as a midfielder and forward.

He has managed in France and Algeria with Noisy-le-Sec and JS Kabylie. He also managed the Algeria national team. He became manager of MO Béjaïa in June 2016, leaving that role in 2017. Sandjak had a brief spell as manager of Moroccan club Chabab Rif Al Hoceima during the last weeks of the 2017–18 Botola.
