= Mouhcine Bouhlal =

Moroccan footballer (1970–2025)

Personal information
- Date of birth: 22 April 1970
- Place of birth: Rabat, Morocco
- Date of death: 5 April 2025 (aged 54)
- Position: Defender

Youth career
- Union de Touarga
- –1987: FAR Rabat

Senior career*
Years	Team	Apps	(Gls)
1987–1999	FAR Rabat		

International career
1992	Morocco U23	3	(0)
1990–1996	Morocco	20	(0)

Managerial career
- 2020-2021: FAR Rabat
- * Club domestic league appearances and goals

Mouhcine Bouhlal (Arabic: محسن بوهلال; 22 April 1970 – 5 April 2025) was a Moroccan footballer. He played for AS FAR, and competed in the 1992 African Cup of Nations and 1992 Summer Olympics.

== Club career ==
Bouhlal played as a defender. He started his football career in Union de Touarga, then moved to AS FAR in the 1988–89 season, and played there for several years. With AS FAR, he won the Moroccan championship in 1989, and the Moroccan Throne Cup in 1998–99. They reached the final of the Throne Cup in 1990, 1996 and 1998.

He participated with his team in the World Military Cup in 1989, 1994, and 1996.

== International career ==
Internationally, Bouhlal played 38 times for the Morocco national team in the 1990s, and also the U-23 national team between 1990 and 1996.

He took part in the Mediterranean Games, as well as the qualifications for the 1994 World cup, and the 1998 AFCON.

== Managerial career ==
Bouhlal was assistant manager of AS FAR under Abderrahim Talib, between July 2019 and 28 December 2020. He then became caretaker manager of the same team until January 2021. In July of the same year he moved to the post of assistant manager of Stade Marocain which plays in the second division, and later became its head manager until January 2023.

== Death ==
Bouhlal died on 5 April 2025, at the age of 54.
