= 2014–15 Botola 2 =

Botola 2
- Season: 2014–15
- Promoted: IR Tanger; MC Oujda
- Relegated: Chabab Houara; Union de Mohammédia
- Matches: 240
- Goals: 423 (1.76 per match)

The 2014–15 Botola 2 was the 53rd season of Botola 2, the second division of the Moroccan football league. Its started on 23 August 2014 and ended on 4 May 2015.

== Teams ==
- Association Salé
- Chabab Houara
- COD Meknès
- IR Tanger
- JS Kasba Tadla
- JS Massira
- MC Oujda
- Olympique Dcheira
- Racing de Casablanca
- Raja Beni Mellal
- Union Aït Melloul
- Union de Mohammédia
- US Témara
- Wydad de Fès
- Wydad Témara
- Youssoufia Berrechid

== League table ==
Pos	Team	Pld	W	D	L	GF	GA	GD	Pts	Promotion or relegation
1	IR Tanger (C, P)	30	13	15	2	22	11	+11	54	Promotion to Botola Pro
2	MC Oujda (P)	30	13	10	7	32	22	+10	49	Promotion to Botola Pro
3	Union Aït Melloul	30	14	6	10	39	24	+15	48	
4	JS Kasba Tadla	30	11	15	4	29	22	+7	48	
5	Youssoufia Berrechid	30	11	13	6	34	25	+9	46	
6	Raja Beni Mellal	30	7	18	5	21	16	+5	39	
7	JSM Laayoune	30	9	10	11	24	24	0	37	
8	Association Salé	30	9	10	11	23	26	−3	37	
9	US Témara	30	9	9	12	33	37	−4	36	
10	COD Meknès	30	7	14	9	28	29	−1	35	
11	Wydad Témara	30	7	14	9	23	26	−3	35	
12	Racing de Casablanca	30	9	8	13	27	35	−8	35	
13	Olympique Dcheira	30	7	12	11	24	32	−8	33	
14	Wydad de Fès	30	6	15	9	19	28	−9	33	
15	Chabab Houara (R)	30	6	13	11	23	31	−8	31	Relegation to GNFA 1
16	Union de Mohammédia (R)	30	6	10	14	22	35	−13	28	Relegation to GNFA 1

Updated to match(es) played on 3 May 2015. Source:
Rules for classification: 1) points; 2) goal difference; 3) number of goals scored.
(C) Champions; (P) Promoted; (R) Relegated

== See also ==
- 2014–15 Botola
