= 2016–17 Botola 2 =

Botola 2
- Season: 2016–17
- Promoted: Rapide Oued Zem; Racing de Casablanca
- Relegated: US Témara; Union Aït Melloul
- Matches played: 240
- Goals scored: 491 (2.05 per match)

The 2016–17 Botola 2 was the 55th season of Botola 2, the second division of the Moroccan football league.

== Team change ==
=== Teams relegated from 2015–16 Botola ===
- MC Oujda
- Maghreb Fès

=== Teams promoted from 2015–16 GNFA 1 ===
- Rapide Oued Zem
- Union Sidi Kacem

== Table ==
Pos	Team	Pld	W	D	L	GF	GA	GD	Pts	Promotion or relegation
1	Rapide Oued Zem (C, P)	30	13	11	6	35	22	+13	50	Promotion to Botola Pro
2	RAC Casablanca (P)	30	14	6	10	41	34	+7	48	Promotion to Botola Pro
3	Maghreb Fès	30	12	8	10	37	28	+9	44	
4	MC Oujda	30	10	14	6	32	24	+8	44	
5	Ittihad Khemisset	30	11	11	8	35	29	+6	44	
6	JS Massira	30	10	14	6	29	25	+4	44	
7	Association Salé	30	12	8	10	38	39	−1	44	
8	Olympique Dcheira	30	8	14	8	32	32	0	38	
9	Youssoufia Berrechid	30	7	15	8	29	33	−4	36	
10	Union Sidi Kacem	30	9	9	12	24	31	−7	36	
11	Rachad Bernoussi	30	8	11	11	34	37	−3	35	
12	Wydad de Fès	30	7	13	10	31	36	−5	34	
13	Wydad Témara	30	6	16	8	19	24	−5	34	
14	Raja Beni Mellal	30	8	10	12	23	33	−10	34	
15	US Témara (R)	30	6	13	11	29	34	−5	31	Relegation to GNFA 1
16	Union Aït Melloul (R)	30	6	13	11	23	30	−7	31	Relegation to GNFA 1

Updated to match(es) played on 15 May 2017. Source:
Rules for classification: 1) points; 2) goal difference; 3) number of goals scored.
(C) Champions; (P) Promoted; (R) Relegated
