= Ismaël Ankobo =

Congolese football player

Ismael Ankobo
Personal information
- Full name: Ismaël Ankobo
- Date of birth: October 13, 1997 (age 29)
- Place of birth: Brazzaville, Republic of the Congo
- Height: 1.78 m (5 ft 10 in)
- Position: Forward

Team information
- Current team: CARA

Senior career*
Years	Team	Apps	(Gls)
2015–2017	AS Kondzo		
2017	Ittihad Tanger	11	(0)
2017–2018	FAR Rabat		
2018–2019	AS Salé		
2019–	CARA		

International career^{‡}
2016	Congo	3	(0)
- * Club domestic league appearances and goals as of 00:00, August 21, 2017 (UTC) ‡ National team caps and goals as of January 25, 2015

Ismaël Ankobo (born October 13, 1997) is a Congolese footballer who plays for CARA.

He was part of the Congo squad that is participated in the qualification of the 2018 World Cup.
