= Amine Ennali =

Moroccan footballer (born 1997)

Personal information
- Full name: Mohammed Amine Ennali
- Date of birth: 17 March 1997 (age 29)
- Place of birth: Tangier, Morocco
- Position: Winger

Youth career
- –2011: DCG
- 2011–2012: AFC
- 2012–2013: Volendam
- 2013–2016: Vitesse
- 2016–2017: Lazio

Senior career*
| Years | Team | Apps | (Gls) |
| 2017–2018 | Achilles '29 | 1 | (0) |
| 2018 | Ittihad Tanger | 1 | (0) |
| 2018 | San Roque de Lepe | 8 | (0) |
| 2018–2019 | AGB | | |
| 2019–2020 | AVV SDZ | | |
| 2022–2023 | JOS Watergraafsmeer | 4 | (0) |

International career
| 2018 | Morocco U23 | 1 | (0) |
- * Club domestic league appearances and goals

Mohammed Amine Ennali (born 17 March 1997) is a Moroccan former footballer who played as a winger.
