= Yahya Boumediene =

Belgian footballer

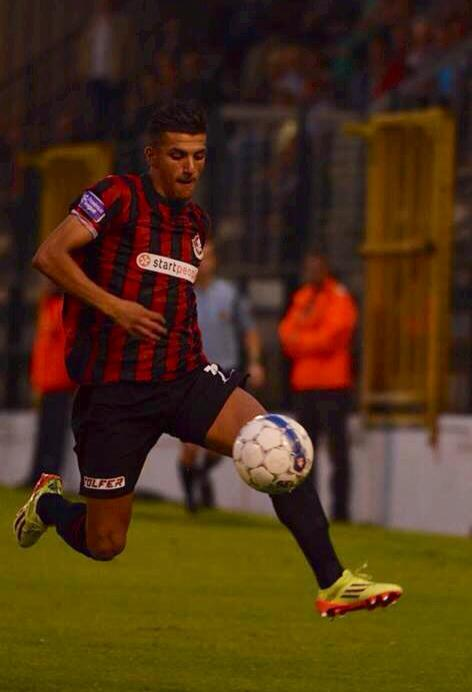
- Yahya Boumediene

Personal information
- Date of birth: 23 May 1990 (age 36)
- Place of birth: Liège, Belgium
- Height: 1.81 m (5 ft 11 in)
- Position: Winger

Senior career*
Years	Team	Apps	(Gls)
2009-2012	Royal Racing Club Hamoir	72	(22)
2012–2013	Patro Eisden	32	(7)
2013–2014	Union SG	28	(9)
2014–2015	RFC Seraing	29	(7)
2015–2016	Mouscron	19	(2)
2016–2017	Ittihad Tanger	21	(4)
2017–2018	FBC Melgar	14	(3)
2017-2018	FC Dordrecht	17	(5)
2018-2019	FC Rapperswil-Jona	24	(4)
2019-2021	Al-Arabi SC (UAE)	26	(6)

International career
- Morocco
- * Club domestic league appearances and goals

Yahya Boumediene born 23 May 1990 in Liège. He is a Belgian-Moroccan professional footballer.

== Personal life ==
Yahya Boumediene is married to the French tennis champion (Wimbledon 2013) Marion Bartoli.

Their daughter was born in December 2020.
