= Mimoun Ouaali =

Moroccan-Dutch footballer and manager

Simon Ouaali
Personal information
- Date of birth: 8 January 1967 (age 59)
- Place of birth: Beni Said, Morocco

Managerial career
- Years: Team
- 2007–2010: Chabab Rif Al Hoceima
- 2010–2011: VVZ '49
- 2011–2015: Sparta Nijkerk
- 2016–2017: VVZ '49
- 2017–2018: Argon
- 2018: Chabab Rif Al Hoceima
- 2019–2020: DVS '33

Mimoun "Simon" Ouaali (born 8 January 1967) is a Moroccan–Dutch football manager. He has coached Chabab Rif Al Hoceima in Morocco and VVZ '49, Sparta Nijkerk, SV Argon and DVS' 33 in the Netherlands. Ouaali received the Rinus Michels Award after the team he managed, Sparta Nijkerk, won a championship in the Hoofdklasse. His younger brother, Saïd Ouaali, was head of the Ajax Youth Academy until July 2023.

== Coaching career ==
Following Nijkerk, Ouaali managed VVZ '49 for a second run and Hoofdklasse fixture SV Argon. He was fired from coaching Argon in January 2018. He coached Chabab Rif Al Hoceima in the Botola from 1 March to 10 September 2018. In November 1999, he became the manager of Ermelo-side DVS '33 in the Derde Divisie. DVS '33 signed another coach for summer 2020.
