= 2017–18 Botola 2 =

Botola 2
- Season: 2017–18
- Promoted: Mouloudia Oujda; Youssoufia Berrechid
- Relegated: Rachad Bernoussi; US Musulmane d'Oujda
- Matches: 240
- Goals: 486 (2.03 per match)

The 2017-2018 GNF2 was the 56th season of Botola 2, the second division of the Moroccan football league.

== Team change ==
=== Teams relegated from 2016–17 Botola ===
- JS de Kasbah Tadla
- KAC Kénitra

=== Teams promoted from 2016–17 GNFA 1 ===
- Chabab Ben Guerir
- US Musulmane d'Oujda

== Table ==
Pos	Team	Pld	W	D	L	GF	GA	GD	Pts	Promotion or relegation
1	MC Oujda (C, P)	30	17	9	4	48	26	+22	60	Promotion to Botola Pro
2	Youssoufia Berrechid (P)	30	15	11	4	43	21	+22	56	Promotion to Botola Pro
3	Raja Beni Mellal	30	17	5	8	38	23	+15	56	
4	Chabab Ben Guerir	30	12	11	7	32	26	+6	47	
5	Olympique Dcheira	30	11	9	10	28	28	0	42	
6	Wydad de Fès	30	9	14	7	26	22	+4	41	
7	Maghreb Fès	30	10	13	7	37	30	+7	40 (Note: Maghreb Fès were deducted 3 point.)	
8	JS Massira	30	9	12	9	29	31	−2	39	
9	Union Sidi Kacem	30	7	14	9	26	33	−7	34 (Note: Union Sidi Kacem were deducted 1 point.)	
10	Association Salé	30	5	18	7	35	34	+1	33	
11	KAC Kénitra	30	6	14	10	19	29	−10	32	
12	Ittihad Khemisset	30	7	10	13	29	36	−7	31	
13	Wydad Témara	30	6	13	11	26	33	−7	31	
14	JS de Kasbah Tadla	30	6	11	13	23	38	−15	29	
15	Rachad Bernoussi (R)	30	5	12	13	24	38	−14	27	Relegation to GNFA 1
16	US Musulmane d'Oujda (R)	30	4	12	14	23	38	−15	24	Relegation to GNFA 1

Updated to match(es) played on 5 May 2018. Source:
Rules for classification: 1) points; 2) goal difference; 3) number of goals scored.
(C) Champions; (P) Promoted; (R) Relegated
