= Yassine Amrioui =

French footballer (born 1995)

Personal information
- Date of birth: 21 February 1995 (age 31)
- Place of birth: Thionville, France
- Height: 1.85 m (6 ft 1 in)
- Position: Centre-back

Team information
- Current team: FC UNA Strassen
- Number: 23

Youth career
- 2001–2005: MJC Pichon Football
- 2005–2012: Nancy

Senior career*
Years	Team	Apps	(Gls)
2012–2014	Nancy B	17	(0)
2014–2015	Reims B	24	(2)
2016	Lokomotiv Plovdiv	6	(0)
2017	Tsarsko Selo	5	(1)
2017–2018	IR Tanger	1	(0)
2018–2019	OCK	24	(1)
2019–2020	FAR Rabat	4	
2021–2023	UTS - Union Touarga Sportive	8	
2023–2024	Schifflange 95	1	(0)
2024–2025	FC UNA Strassen		

International career
2010–2011	France U16	5	(0)
2011–2012	France U17	3	(0)
2017–2018	Morocco A'	1	(0)
- * Club domestic league appearances and goals as of 1 July 2024

Yassine Amrioui (born 21 February 1995) is a professional footballer who plays as a centre-back for FC UNA Strassen in Luxembourg. Born in France and a youth international for that nation, he possesses Moroccan nationality and has been selected for their 'A' team (domestic league players).

== Career ==
=== Lokomotiv Plovdiv ===
For season 2016–17, Amrioui signed a three-year contract with Bulgarian club Lokomotiv Plovdiv. He was included in the main squad for the match against Levski Sofia. During the same game, he made his debut in the A Group, providing an assist for the first goal in the match for the team.

=== Ittihad Riadi Tanger ===
On 10 July 2017, Amrioui signed a one-year contract with Ittihad de Tanger. He also made his debut in FRMF with the head coach Jamal Sellami

=== Olympique Club Khouribga ===
On 17 January 2018, Amrioui signed a two-and-half-year contract with OCK.

=== As Far ===
On 20 August 2019, Amrioui signed a two-year contract with FAR Rabat. He didn't play a lot, so he decided to end the contract with the club and signed with the prestigious UTS - Union Touarga Sportive team.

=== Union Touarga ===
January 2021, new adventure for Amrioui and the young team UTS - Union Touarga Sportive. Summer 2021 after a good preparation and a game against national Olympique Moroccan team. Amrioui make ACL after 20min. At the end of his contract, he decided to be back in Europe near his family.

=== Fc Schifflange 95 ===
In summer 2023, back in Europe, Amrioui signed with the ambitious team of BGL.

=== UNA Strassen ===
June 2024, after a good coaling with the Head Coach Vitor Pereira, Amrioui sign two year and one option contract. In July, the team will play the Europa Conference League qualifications for his first-time history.
