= Mame Saher Thioune =

Senegalese footballer

Personal information
- Full name: Mame Saher Thioune
- Date of birth: 21 December 1989 (age 36)
- Place of birth: Ziguinchor, Senegal
- Height: 1.77 m (5 ft 10 in)
- Position: Centre back

Team information
- Current team: Al-Shabab

Senior career*
Years	Team	Apps	(Gls)
2008–2015	Casa Sports		
2015–2017	Chabab Atlas Khénifra	24	(2)
2017–2018	Ittihad Tanger		
2018–2019	Naft Al-Junoob		
2019–2020	Teungueth FC		
2020–2021	Al-Shabab		

International career
- Senegal U23
2010	Senegal	2	(0)
- * Club domestic league appearances and goals as of 20 October 2018

Mame Saher Thioune (born 21 December 1989), is a Senegalese international footballer playing as a defender for Al-Shabab.

== International debut ==
On 10 May 2010, Mame Saher Thioune made his first international cap with Senegal against Mexico in a friendly match.

== Awards ==
- Finalist UFOA Cup 2010 with Casa Sports
- Senegal champion in 2012 with Casa Sports
- Vice-champion of Senegal in 2008 and 2009 with Casa Sports
- Winner of the Senegal FA Cup in 2011 with Casa Sports
- Finalist of the Senegal FA Cup in 2013 and 2015 with Casa Sports
- Winner of the Senegalese League Cup in 2010 and 2013 with Casa Sports
