= Mehdi Naghmi =

Moroccan footballer

Personal information
- Date of birth: 21 October 1988 (age 38)
- Place of birth: Kasba Tadla, Morocco
- Height: 1.76 m (5 ft 9 in)
- Position: Forward

Team information
- Current team: CA Khénifra

Senior career*
Years	Team	Apps	(Gls)
2009–2010	FAR Rabat	6	(0)
2010–2011	JSK Tadla	14	(1)
2011–2017	FAR Rabat	126+	(40)
2017–2019	IR Tanger	59	(21)
2019–2020	MC Oujda	27	(3)
2020–2021	OC Khouribga		
2021	Stade Marocain		
2022	MC Oujda		
2022–2023	IZ Khemisset		
2023–	CA Khénifra		

International career^{‡}
2014–	Morocco	15	(6)
- * Club domestic league appearances and goals ‡ National team caps and goals as of 22 April 2022

Mehdi Naghmi (Arabic: مهدي النغمي; born 21 October 1988) is a Moroccan footballer who plays as a forward for CA Khénifra.

== Honours ==
Ittihad Tanger

- Botola: 2017–18

Individual

- Botola top scorer: 2015–16
