= 2017–18 Botola Pro =

Moroccan football league season

Botola
- Season: 2017–18
- Champions: IR Tanger; 1st title
- Relegated: Racing AC, CA Khénifra
- Champions League: IR Tanger; Wydad AC
- Confederation Cup: HUS Agadir; Raja CA; RS Berkane
- Matches: 240
- Goals: 545 (2.27 per match)
- Top goalscorer: Mouhssine Iajour (17 goals)
- Biggest home win: OC Khouribga 5–0 Racing AC (13 May 2018)
- Biggest away win: OC Khouribga 0–5 Wydad AC (28 November 2017)
- Highest scoring: Raja CA 4–3 OC Khouribga (14 February 2018); MA Tétouan 4–3 CA Khénifra (18 February 2018); Wydad AC 5–2 OC Khouribga (8 April 2018); AS FAR 3–4 OC Safi (14 April 2018); KAC Marrakech 2–5 DH Jadidi (28 April 2018)
- Longest winning run: 8 matches IR Tanger
- Longest unbeaten run: 23 matches Wydad AC
- Longest winless run: 11 matches Racing AC
- Longest losing run: 6 matches MA Tétouan

The 2017–18 Botola, also known as Botola Maroc Telecom for sponsorship reasons, is the 61st season of the Premier League and the 7th under its new format of Moroccan Pro League, the top Moroccan professional league for association football clubs, since its establishment in 1956. The season started on 8 September 2017 and ended on 21 May 2018.

Wydad Athletic Club came into the season as defending champions of the 2016–17 season. Rapide Oued Zem and Racing de Casablanca entered as the two promoted teams from the 2016–17 GNF 2.

On May 12, 2018, IR Tanger won the Botola Pro after a 2-1 victory against Moghreb Tétouan. The IR Tanger club won the championship for the first time after being runner-up to the title in 1989-90 season.

== Teams ==
=== Stadium and locations ===
Locations of the 2017–18 Botola teams

Team	Acronym	Location	Stadium	Capacity
Association sportive des FAR	AS FAR	Rabat	Stade Moulay Abdellah	52,000
Chabab Atlas Khénifra	CAK	Khenifra	Stade Municipal	5,000
Chabab Rif Al Hoceima	CRA	Al Hoceima	Stade Mimoun Al Arsi	12,000
Difaâ El Jadidi	DHJ	El Jadida	Stade El Abdi	15,000
Fath Union Sport	FUS	Rabat	Stade de FUS	15,000
Hassania Agadir	HUSA	Agadir	Stade Adrar	45,480
IR Tanger	IRT	Tangier	Grand Stade de Tanger	45,000
Kawkab Marrakech	KACM	Marrakesh	Stade de Marrakech	45,240
Moghreb Tétouan	MAT	Tétouan	Saniat Rmel	15,000
Olympic Safi	OCS	Safi	Stade El Massira	10,000
Olympique Khouribga	OCK	Khouribga	Complexe OCP	10,000
Racing de Casablanca	RAC	Casablanca	Stade Père-Jégo	10,000
Raja Casablanca	RCA	Casablanca	Stade Mohamed V	67,000
Rapide Oued Zem	RCOZ	Oued Zem	Stade Municipal	3,000
RSB Berkane	RSB	Berkane	Stade Municipal	15,000
Wydad Casablanca	WAC	Casablanca	Stade Mohamed V	67,000

=== Personnel and kits ===
Teams	Managers	Kit manufacturer	Shirt sponsor
Association sportive des FAR	(Morocco) Abderrazak Khairi	Uhlsport	
Chabab Atlas Khénifra	(Tunisia) Kamal Zouaghi	Bang Sports	
Chabab Rif Al Hoceima	(Algeria) Nacer Sandjak	Bang Sports	Al Omrane, CGI
Difaâ El Jadidi	(Morocco) Abderrahim Talib	Bang Sports	innjoo, Radio Mars, TGCC^{1}
FUS Rabat	(Morocco) Walid Regragui	Uhlsport	Emaar, Novec^{1}, LafargeHolcim^{2}^{3}
Hassania Agadir	(Argentina) Miguel Ángel Gamondi	Uhlsport	Afriquia, Skoda^{1}, Souss-Massa^{2}, Joly^{3}
IR Tanger	(Morocco) Driss El Mrabet	Bang Sports	Renault, APM Terminals, Tanger-Med^{1}, Moroccan Airports Authority^{1}, Valencia^{1}, RCI Finance Maroc^{3}
Kawkab Marrakesh	(Morocco) Faouzi Jamal	Puma	Poste Maroc, Sanad, CitySport, Menara Mall^{1}
Moghreb Tétouan	(Morocco) Abdelouahed Benhsain	King Sports Maroc	Halib Tetaouen, Radio Mars
OC Khouribga	(France) Bernard Simondi	Bang Sports	
Olympic Safi	(Morocco) Mohamed Amine Benhachem	Uhlsport	Fitco
Racing de Casablanca	(Morocco) Youssef Rossi		
Raja Casablanca	(Spain) Juan Carlos Garrido	Legea	Siera, Nor'Dar, Prodec, Infinix, Hyundai^{1}, Or Blanc^{1}, MarsaMaroc^{2}^{3}, Atlanta Assurances^{2}^{3}
Rapide Oued Zem	(Egypt) Tarek Mostafa	Bang Sports	Boudrika Holding
RSB Berkane	(Morocco) Mounir Jaouani	Bang Sports	Souiri, Afriquia^{1}
Wydad Casablanca	(Tunisia) Faouzi Benzarti	Macron	Ingelec, Alitkane^{2}, Koutoubia^{2}

1. On the back of shirt.
2. On the sleeves.
3. On the shorts.

- Maroc Telecom is a sponsor for all the league's teams.
- Additionally, referee kits are made by Adidas.

=== Managerial changes ===
Teams	Outgoing manager	Manner of departure	Date of vacancy	Incoming manager	Date of appointment
Racing de Casablanca	(Morocco) Abdelhak Rizkallah	Retired	20 May 2017	(Morocco) Youssef Rossi	14 Juin 2017
IR Tanger	(Morocco) Bachir Bouita	End of contract	25 May 2017	(Morocco) Ezzaki Badou	20 May 2017
Hassania Agadir	(Spain) Francisco Javier Bernal	End of contract	26 May 2017	(Argentina) Miguel Ángel Gamondi	4 June 2017
Raja Casablanca	(Morocco) Mohamed Fakhir	Resigned	26 May 2017	(Algeria) Abdelhak Benchikha	7 June 2017
Chabab Rif Al Hoceima	(Morocco) Youssef Fertout	End of contract	26 May 2017	(Spain) Juan Pedro Benali	11 July 2017
Moghreb Tétouan	(Morocco) Amin Erbati (interim)	End of tenure as caretaker	28 May 2017	(Morocco) Fouad Sahabi	3 June 2017
Raja Casablanca	(Algeria) Abdelhak Benchikha	Resigned	16 June 2017	(Spain) Juan Carlos Garrido	20 June 2017
Moghreb Tétouan	(Morocco) Fouad Sahabi	Resigned	30 August 2017	(Algeria) Abdelhak Benchikha	5 September 2017
OC Khouribga	(Algeria) Azzedine Aït Djoudi	Sacked	3 October 2017	(France) Bernard Simondi	14 October 2017
Moghreb Tétouan	(Algeria) Abdelhak Benchikha	Resigned	19 November 2017	(Morocco) Youssef Fertout	19 November 2017
IR Tanger	(Morocco) Ezzaki Badou	Sacked	21 November 2017	(Morocco) Driss El Mrabet	21 November 2017
RSB Berkane	(Morocco) Rachid Taoussi	Sacked	27 November 2017	(Morocco) Mounir Aljawani	27 November 2017
Chabab Atlas Khénifra	(Morocco) Samir Yaich	Contract termination	3 December 2017	(Tunisia) Kamal Zouaghi	26 December 2017
AS FAR	(Morocco) Aziz El Amri	Sacked	11 December 2017	(Morocco) Abderrazak Khairi	13 December 2017
Wydad Casablanca	(Morocco) Hussein Amotta	Sacked	9 January 2018	(Tunisia) Faouzi Benzarti	19 January 2018
Chabab Rif Al Hoceima	(Spain) Juan Pedro Benali	Contract termination	31 January 2018	(Algeria) Nacer Sandjak	1 February 2018
Rapide Oued Zem	(Morocco) Mohamed Backary	Sacked	20 February 2018	(Morocco) Fouad Sahabi	21 February 2018
Moghreb Tétouan	(Morocco) Youssef Fertout	Sacked	27 February 2018	(Morocco) Abdelouahed Benhsain	21 February 2018
Rapide Oued Zem	(Morocco) Fouad Sahabi	Refused by the Federation	20 February 2018	(Egypt) Tarek Mostafa	20 March 2018
Kawkab Marrakesh	(Morocco) Youssef Meriana	Sacked	29 April 2018	(Morocco) Faouzi Jamal	29 April 2018

== League table ==
=== Standings ===
Pos	Team	Pld	W	D	L	GF	GA	GD	Pts	Qualification or relegation
1	IR Tanger (C)	30	14	10	6	34	23	+11	52	Qualification for the CAF Champions League
2	Wydad Casablanca	30	14	9	7	44	26	+18	51 (Note: Wydad Casablanca finished ahead of Hassania Agadir on goals scored: Wydad Casablanca 44, hassania Agadir 40)	Qualification for the CAF Champions League
3	Hassania Agadir	30	13	12	5	40	22	+18	51	Qualification for the CAF Confederation Cup
4	FUS Rabat	30	13	10	7	34	26	+8	49	
5	Difaâ El Jadidi	30	13	9	8	49	33	+16	48 (Note: Difaa Jadidi finished ahead of Raja Casablanca on head-to-head goal difference: Difaa Jadidi 2–1 Raja Casablanca, Raja Casablanca 3–2 Difaa Jadidi)	
6	Raja Casablanca	30	13	9	8	45	33	+12	48	Qualification for the CAF Confederation Cup (Note: Raja CA qualified for the Confederation Cup First round as the title holders, by winning the 2018 CAF Confederation Cup.)
7	Olympic Safi	30	10	13	7	32	28	+4	43 (Note: Olympic Safi finished ahead of AS FAR on head-to-head points: Olympic Safi 1–1 AS FAR, AS FAR 3–4 Olympic Safi)	
8	AS FAR	30	11	10	9	35	34	+1	43	
9	RSB Berkane	30	11	8	11	36	34	+2	41	Qualification for the CAF Confederation Cup (Note: RS Berkane qualified for the Confederation Cup First round by winning the 2018 Moroccan Throne Cup.)
10	Rapide Oued Zem	30	10	7	13	27	31	−4	37	
11	Moghreb Tétouan	30	10	6	14	24	35	−11	36	
12	Olympique Khouribga	30	9	8	13	37	47	−10	35	
13	Chabab Rif Al Hoceima	30	7	12	11	27	31	−4	33	
14	Kawkab Marrakesh	30	8	8	14	29	47	−18	32	
15	Chabab Atlas Khénifra (R)	30	6	11	13	30	41	−11	29	Relegation to the Botola 2
16	Racing de Casablanca (R)	30	3	8	19	22	54	−32	17	Relegation to the Botola 2

Source: frmf.ma
Rules for classification: 1) Points; 2) Head-to-head points; 3) Head-to-head goal difference; 4) Goal difference; 5) Goals scored; 6) Fair-play points; 7) Play-off.
(C) Champions; (R) Relegated

=== Results ===
Home \ Away	IRT	WAC	HUSA	FUS	DHJ	RCA	OCS	FAR	RSB	RCOZ	MAT	OCK	CRA	KACM	CAK	RAC
IR Tanger	—	0–0	2–2	1–2	1–0	1–1	1–0	0–1	2–1	1–0	2–1	2–0	3–0	1–0	1–0	1–1
Wydad AC	0–1	—	1–0	1–3	2–1	1–2	0–1	3–1	2–1	3–1	0–0	5–2	1–0	4–1	3–1	0–0
HUS Agadir	1–1	1–0	—	2–1	3–1	1–0	1–0	2–2	3–0	1–0	2–1	3–0	0–0	1–1	0–0	2–1
Fath US	0–0	2–4	2–1	—	1–0	0–0	0–0	1–1	0–0	1–0	2–0	0–0	0–2	2–1	4–1	2–0
DH Jadidi	1–1	0–1	1–0	3–0	—	2–1	1–0	1–0	1–2	3–1	3–0	4–1	3–1	1–0	0–0	1–1
Raja CA	1–1	1–1	2–1	1–2	3–2	—	0–0	2–0	2–1	3–1	0–0	4–3	1–1	4–0	1–2	2–0
OC Safi	1–0	1–1	1–1	1–0	2–2	2–0	—	1–1	1–0	0–0	0–0	2–0	2–1	2–1	1–1	2–2
AS FAR	2–1	0–0	0–0	0–0	1–2	2–1	3–4	—	1–3	0–0	2–0	1–0	2–2	2–3	1–2	2–0
RS Berkane	0–3	2–1	1–1	0–1	0–0	1–0	1–0	2–3	—	0–0	1–2	1–1	2–1	3–2	2–1	4–0
RC Oued Zem	2–0	1–1	0–0	0–1	0–0	3–1	1–0	0–1	1–1	—	2–0	1–0	1–0	1–2	1–0	2–1
MA Tétouan	0–1	1–2	0–1	0–2	1–0	1–3	2–2	1–0	1–0	1–0	—	2–1	0–2	1–0	4–3	1–1
OC Khouribga	1–1	0–5	2–1	2–1	3–3	1–1	2–2	1–2	1–0	1–0	1–0	—	1–1	3–0	1–0	5–0
CR Al Hoceima	2–0	0–0	1–1	0–0	2–2	0–0	2–1	1–1	1–1	1–2	0–2	1–1	—	1–0	2–0	1–2
KAC Marrakesh	2–2	2–1	0–0	2–1	2–5	0–3	1–1	0–1	0–2	3–2	0–0	2–1	1–0	—	1–1	0–0
CA Khénifra	0–1	0–0	1–5	1–1	3–3	2–3	2–0	0–0	1–1	2–3	2–0	0–1	1–0	0–0	—	2–0
Racing AC	1–2	0–1	0–3	2–2	0–3	1–2	1–2	0–1	1–3	3–1	0–2	2–1	0–1	1–2	1–1	—

Updated to match(es) played on 21 May 2018. Source: Botola Pro
Legend: Blue = home team win; Yellow = draw; Red = away team win.
For upcoming matches, an "a" indicates there is an article about the rivalry between the two participants.

== Season statistics ==
=== Top goalscorers ===
As of 20 May 2018.

Rank	Player	Club	Goals
1	(Morocco) Mouhssine Iajour	Raja CA	17
2	(Morocco) Mehdi Naghmi	IR Tanger	13
3	(Morocco) Ayoub El Kaabi	RS Berkane	12
4	(Tanzania) Simon Msuva	DH Jadidi	11
5	(Morocco) Zouhair El Moutaraji	OC Khouribga	10
5	(Morocco) Jalal Daoudi	HUS Agadir	10
7	(Morocco) Ibrahim Bezghoudi	AS FAR	9
7	(Morocco) Mohamed Nahiri	Wydad AC	9
7	(Morocco) Bilal El Megri	DH Jadidi	9
7	(Morocco) Hamid Ahaddad	DH Jadidi	9

=== Hat-tricks ===
Player	For	Against	Result	Date	Round
(Morocco) Hamid Ahaddad	DH Jadidi	OC Khouribga	4–1 (H)	3 December 2017	10
(Morocco) Mouhssine Iajour	Raja CA	OC Khouribga	4–3 (H)	14 February 2018	16
(Morocco) Hamza Goudali	OC Safi	AS FAR	4–3 (A)	14 April 2018	25

(H) – Home; (A) – Away

== Annual awards ==
The UMFP (Union Marocaine des Footballeurs Professionnels), in partnership with the Royal Moroccan Football Federation, organized the Night of Stars Award in its 4th edition, which celebrated the brilliants of the Botola Pro for the 2017/18 season.

Award	Winner	Club
Manager of the Season	(Morocco) Driss El Mrabet	IR Tanger
Player of the Season	(Morocco) Ahmed Hammoudan	IR Tanger
Promising Player of the Season	(Morocco) Mahmoud Benhalib	Raja CA
Goalkeeper of the Season	(Morocco) Abderrahman El Houasli	HUS Agadir
Referee of the Season	(Morocco) Redouane Achik	
Club of the Season	IR Tanger	

== Attendances ==
#	Football club	Average attendance
1	IR Tanger	23,750
2	Raja CA	19,615
3	Wydad AC	15,821
4	Hassania Agadir	11,636
5	AS FAR	10,545
6	MA Tétouan	7,836
7	Olympique Safi	7,714
8	RC Oued Zem	7,692
9	KACM	6,477
10	CA Khénifra	6,342
11	Olympique Khouribga	5,613
12	DHJ	5,064
13	Fath Union Sport	3,250
14	CRA	2,633
15	RS Berkane	2,600
16	Racing Casablanca	2,091

== See also ==
2017 Coupe du Trône
2017–18 Botola 2
2018 CAF Champions League
2018 CAF Confederation Cup
