= Driss El Mrabet =

Moroccan footballer and manager

Personal information
- Date of birth: 29 January 1967 (age 59)
- Place of birth: Tangier, Morocco
- Position: Midfielder

Team information
- Current team: Oman Club (manager)

Youth career
- Hassania Tanger

Senior career*
Years	Team	Apps	(Gls)
1986–1994	IR Tanger		
1994–1995	Torreense	9	(0)
1995–1996	IR Tanger		
1996–1998	Wydad Fès		
1998	Al-Orouba		
1999–2000	Dibba Al-Fujairah		

International career
1992	Morocco		

Managerial career
- 2000–2001: IR Tanger (assistant)
- Tihad Chaouen
- 2007–2009: Al-Orouba
- 2009–2010: Al-Nasr
- 2011: Saham
- 2012–2013: Al-Ittihad
- 2013: Al-Orouba
- 2013–2014: Al-Shabab
- 2014: Sur
- 2014–: Dibba Al-Hisn
- 2016: Sur
- 2017: IR Tanger (assistant)
- 2017–2018: IR Tanger
- 2020–2021: IR Tanger
- 2022–2023: Oman Club
- 2023: Al Ansar
- 2024–2025: Ahli Sanaa
- 2025–: Oman Club
- * Club domestic league appearances and goals

Driss El Mrabet (Arabic: ادريس المرابط; born 26 January 1967) is a Moroccan football manager and former player who manages Oman Club. A midfielder, he played at international level, competing at the 1992 African Cup of Nations.

== Honours ==
=== Manager ===
Al-Ittihad Club (Salalah)

- Oman First Division League: 2012–13

Al-Oruba SC

- Omani League: 2007–08
- Oman Super Cup: 2008

IR Tanger

- Botola: 2017–18

=== Individual ===
- Botola Best Manager of the Season: 2017–18.
