= Mohamed Amine Benhachem =

Moroccan football manager (born 1975)

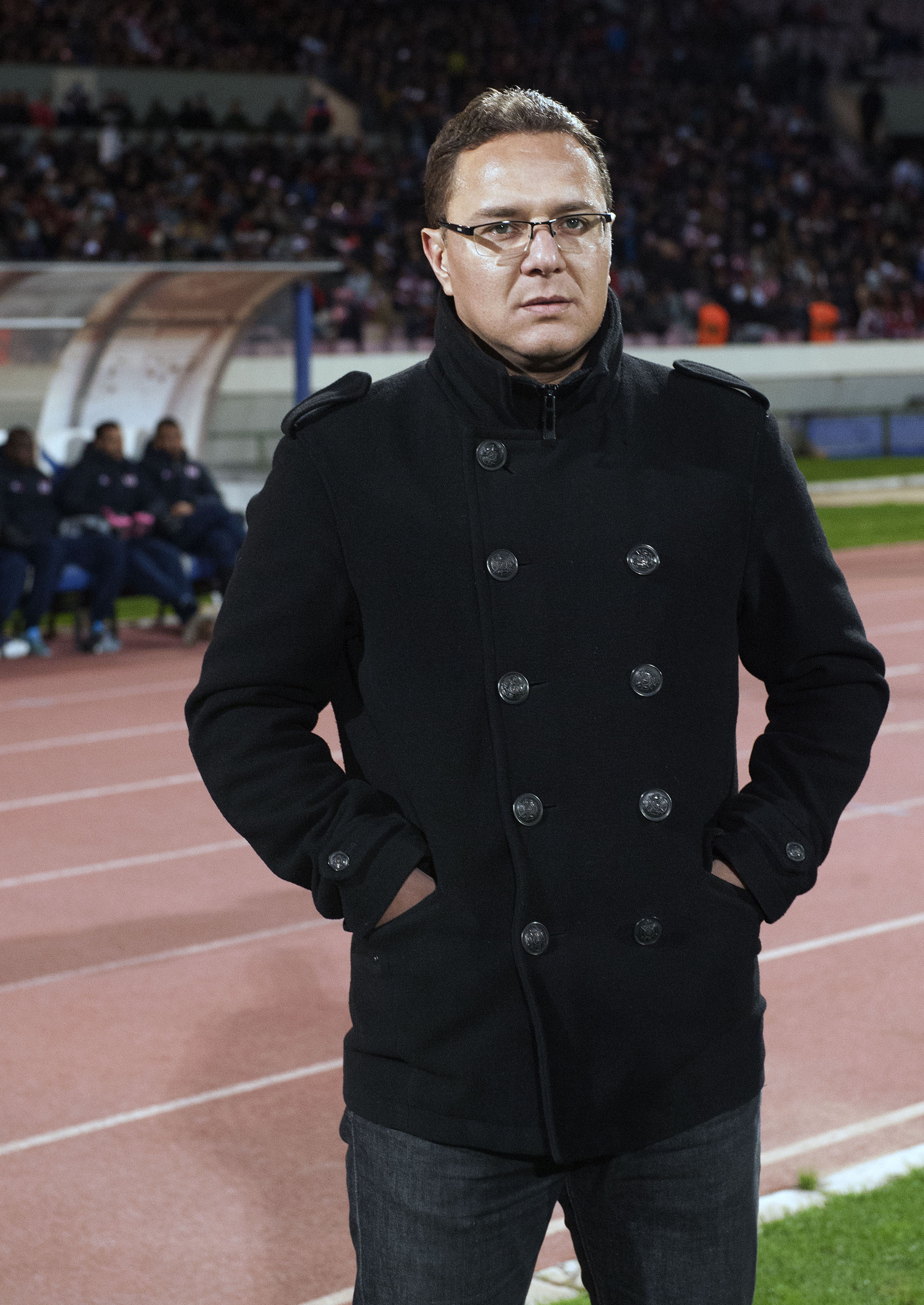
- Amine Benhachem in 2013

Personal information
- Full name: Mohamed Amine Benhachem
- Date of birth: 20 June 1975 (age 51)
- Place of birth: Casablanca, Morocco
- Position: Midfielder

Senior career*
Years	Team	Apps	(Gls)
1994–1996	Raja CA		
1996	RS Settat		
1996–1997	Hassania Agadir		
1997–1998	RWS Bruxelles		
1998–1999	Al Ahli		
1999–2002	Montreal Impact		
2002	Wydad AC		
2003–2004	RS Settat		

International career
2000–2001	Morocco		
2007–2008	Morocco beach soccer		

Managerial career
- 2008: Chabab Houara
- 2009: IR Tanger
- 2009–2011: CR Bernoussi
- 2011: Wydad de Fès
- 2011–2012: USM Aït Melloul
- 2012: Wydad de Fès
- 2013–2014: AS Salé
- 2014–2015: IR Tanger
- 2016–2018: Olympic Club Safi
- 2018–2019: Olympique Club de Khouribga
- 2020–2021: SCC Mohammédia
- 2021: Fath Union Sport
- 2023–2025: RCA Zemamra
- 2025–2026: Wydad AC
- * Club domestic league appearances and goals

Mohamed Amine Benhachem (Arabic: محمد أمين بنهاشم; born 20 June 1975) is a Moroccan professional football manager and former player who is the head coach of Botola Pro club Wydad AC.

== Career statistics ==
=== Managerial ===
As of match played 26 July 2025

Managerial record by team and tenure
Team	From	To	Record					Ref.
Team	From	To	P	W	D	L	Win %	Ref.
RCA Zemamra	11 October 2023	3 March 2025	54	25	12	17	46.30	
Wydad AC	29 April 2025	Present	6	3	0	3	50.00	
Total			60	28	12	20	46.67	

== Honours ==
=== Player ===
Wydad AC

- Moroccan Throne Cup: 2000–01
- African Cup Winners' Cup: 2002
