= Aziz El Amri =

Moroccan footballer and coach

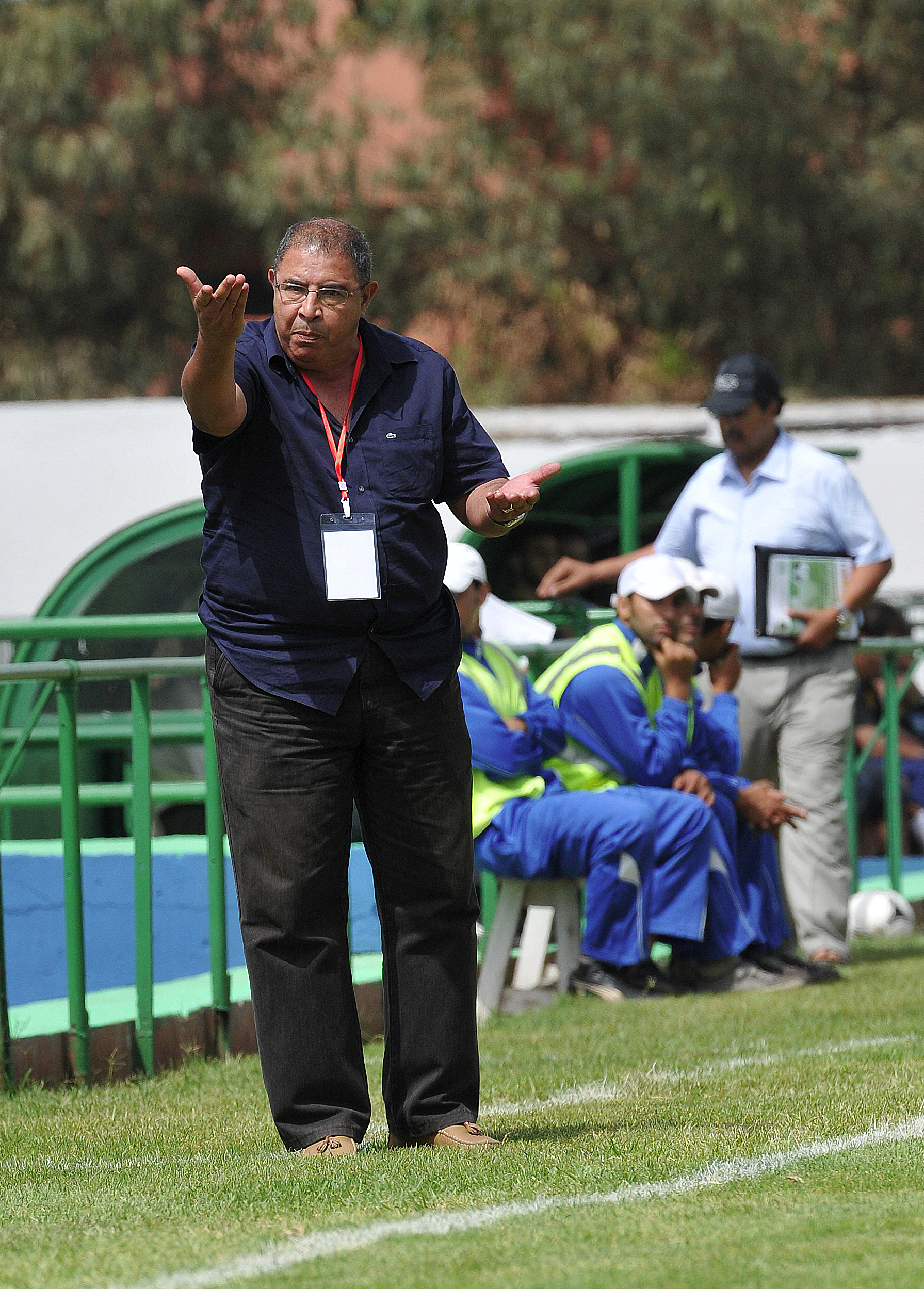

Personal information
- Date of birth: 1 January 1950 (age 76)
- Place of birth: Sidi Kacem, Morocco
- Position: Midfielder

Managerial career
- Years: Team
- 1984–1990: US Sidi Kacem
- 1996–1997: IR Tangier
- 2001–2002: IR Tangier
- 2002–2003: Maghreb of Fez
- 2003–2004: Olympic Club Safi
- 2006–2007: COD Meknès
- 2007–2008: KAC Marrakech
- 2010: AS FAR
- 2011–2014: MA Tétouan
- 2015: CR Al Hoceima
- 2015–2016: Olympic Club Safi
- 2016–2017: AS FAR
- 2018: Al Kharaitiyat SC
- 2018–2019: KAC Marrakech
- 2019–2020: Raja Beni Mellal
- 2024–2025: MA Tétouan

Aziz El Amri (born 1 January 1950) is a Moroccan football coach and former player.

El Amri was manager of Moghreb Tétouan until resigning in December 2014.

In October 2024, El Amri returned to Moghreb Tétouan following the team's poor performance with the preceding coach, Dalibor Starčević. However, he was sacked late in December after the club failed to improve its winning record.
