= 2021–22 IR Tanger season =

Tanger
2021–22 season
- President: Abdelhamid Aberchane (until 11 October); Abdelouahed Azibou Mokrai (interim; from 13 to 16 October); Idriss Hanifa (interim; from 16 to 20 October); Mohamed Ahagan (interim; from 22 October to 20 December. elected; from 21 December)
- Manager: Bernard Casoni (until 2 November); Jaafar R'kyek (interim, from 2 to 30 November); Miguel Ángel Gamondi (from 30 November, until 17 April); Juan Pedro Benali (from 18 April)
- Stadium: Stade Ibn Batouta
- Botola: 13th
- Moroccan Throne Cup: Round of 16
- Top goalscorer: League: Axel Méyé (12); All: Axel Méyé (12)
- Biggest win: 0–3 vs CAY Berrechid
- Biggest defeat: 4–1 vs RS Berkane; 3–0 vs SCC Mohammédia; 4–1 vs AS FAR
Home colours	Away colours	Third colours
- All statistics correct as of 5 July 2022.

The 2021–22 season is Ittihad Riadi Tanger's 39th season in existence and the club's 23rd in the top flight of Moroccan football, and seventh consecutive.

== Kit ==
Supplier: Gloria Sport / Club Sponsor: front: Tanger-Med, back: Biougnach / League Sponsor: sleeves: Inwi.

Home	Away	Third

== Season review ==
=== August ===
On 6 August, Ittihad Tanger announced the departure of Driss El Mrabet as the first team head coach by mutual consent.

On 8 August, Ittihad Tanger announced that Bernard Casoni would be the new head coach until 30 June 2023.

On 13 August, Ittihad Tanger announced the signing of Hamdi Laachir from RS Berkane on a free transfer.

On 14 August, Ittihad Tanger announced the signing of Abdelatif Noussir from MA Tétouan on a Free transfer.

On 18 August, Ittihad Tanger announced the signing of Youssef Benali from Bourges Foot on a Free transfer.

On 20 August, Ittihad Tanger announced the return of Ahmad Hamoudan from a serie of loans since 2018, the last one to Umm Salal SC.

On 24 August, Ittihad Tanger announced the signing of Abdellah El Moudene from MC Oujda on a Free transfer. The Club Also announced the signing of Mouad Ajandouz from Mohammed VI Football Academy.

=== September ===
On 4 September, Ittihad Tanger announced the signing of Hamza Hassani Boouia from CR Al Hoceima on a Free transfer. The Club Also announced the signing of Habib Allah Dahmani from Muaither SC.

On 11 September, Ittihad Tanger announced the signing of Pape Paye from Sochaux on a Free transfer.

=== October ===
On 11 October, President Abdelhamid Aberchane announced his resignation and the resignation of his board of directors, after nine years of being the head of the club.

=== November ===
On 2 November, Ittihad Tanger announced the dismissal of Bernard Casoni as the first team coach, ending his spell at the club after 3 months, and announced the appointment of the training director Jaafar R'kyek as the interim manager of the first team.

On 30 November, Ittihad Tanger announced the appointment of Miguel Ángel Gamondi as the new first team head coach until 2024.

=== December ===
On 7 March, Mohamed Ahagan was elected as the new club president.

=== January ===
On 6 January, Ittihad Tanger Terminate the contract of player Pape Paye by mutual consent.

=== February ===
On 18 January, Ittihad Tangiers and the Biougnach brand sign a sponsorship and advertising contract for the remainder of the season.

=== April ===
On 17 April, Ittihad Tanger announced the termination of the first team coach Miguel Ángel Gamondi's contract and his assistant Tarik Chihab unilaterally.

On 18 April, Ittihad Tanger announced its contract with coach Juan Pedro Benali to supervise the team until the end of the current sports season.

== Squad ==
As of match played 5 July 2022

No.	Name	Nationality	Position	Date of birth (age)	Signed from	Signed in	Contract ends	Apps.	Goals
Goalkeepers
12	Imad Askar	(Morocco)	GK	29 May 1998 (age 28)	MA Tétouan	2018	2024	3	(-6)
55	Tarik Ouattah	(Morocco)	GK	7 September 1992 (age 34)	CR Al Hoceima	2017	2023	39	(-34)
65	Hicham El Mejhed (5th captain)	(Morocco)	GK	9 April 1991 (age 35)	HUS Agadir	2018 (winter)	2023	99	(-116)
Defenders
3	Hatim El Ouahabi	(Morocco)	DF	3 October 1999 (age 27)	Widad-Juventud	2017	2024	62	1
4	Hakim Aklidou	(Morocco)	DF	2 July 1997 (age 29)	CR Al Hoceima	2020	2023	21	0
13	Oussama Al Aiz	(Morocco)	DF	26 January 1999 (age 27)	Academy	2020		23	0
15	Ayoub Jarfi (4th captain)	(Morocco)	DF	8 March 1996 (age 30)	Academy	2016	2022	113	2
20	Mohamed Ayman Sadil	(Morocco)	DF	10 June 1994 (age 32)	Raja CA	2019	2022	50	0
28	Abdelatif Noussir	(Morocco)	DF	20 February 1990 (age 36)	MA Tétouan	2021	2023	19	0
29	El Hadji Youssoupha Konaté	(Senegal)	DF	6 May 1994 (age 32)	JS Saoura	2019	2022	85	4
40	Mehdi Khallati (3rd captain)	(Morocco)	DF	7 December 1991 (age 34)	AS FAR (A)	2019	2023	51	1
Midfielders
5	Mohammed Ali Bemammer	(Morocco)	MF	19 November 1989 (age 36)	AS FAR	2020	2022	53	1
6	Nouaman Aarab (vice-captain)	(Morocco)	MF	27 August 1990 (age 36)	CA Khénifra	2017	2023	130	5
8	Faouzi Abdel Mutalib	(Morocco)	MF	19 July 1993 (age 33)	CR Bernoussi	2019	2023	44	2
10	Kahled Serroukh	(Morocco)	MF	27 April 1990 (age 36)	OC Khouribga (A)	2020 (2)	2023	64	4
14	Habib Allah Dahmani	(Morocco)	MF	16 October 1993 (age 33)	Muaither SC	2021	2023	5	0
21	Abdellah El Moudene	(Algeria)	MF	11 February 1994 (age 32)	MC Oujda	2021	2023	20	1
70	Hamza Hassani Boouia	(Morocco)	MF	24 March 1995 (age 31)	CR Al Hoceima	2021	2024	12	0
Forwards
7	Ahmad Hamoudan (captain)	(Morocco)	FW	12 July 1991 (age 35)	FC Tétouan	2012	2022	125	19
9	Mouad Ajandouz	(Morocco)	FW	18 February 2002 (age 24)	Mohammed VI Football Academy	2021	2023	0	0
11	Axel Méyé	(Gabon)	FW	6 June 1995 (age 31)	CR Al Hoceima	2020	2023	54	25
17	Hamdi Laachir	(Morocco)	FW	13 June 1987 (age 39)	RS Berkane	2021	2023	27	2
23	Abdellatif Akhrif	(Morocco)	FW	1 February 2000 (age 26)	Academy	2020	2026	40	2
31	Youssef Benali	(Morocco) (France)	FW	4 February 1995 (age 31)	Bourges 18	2021	2023	29	3
76	Taoufik Ijroten	(Morocco)	FW	13 April 1990 (age 36)	RS Berkane	2020 (winter)	2023	74	13
Players who have left the club during the season
24	Pape Paye	(France) (Senegal)	DF	31 May 1990 (age 36)	Sochaux	2021	2022	7	0
2	Anas El Asbahi	(Morocco)	MF	15 October 1993 (age 33)	Wydad AC	2020 (winter)	2023	38	0

- = ineligible players
- (A) = originally from the academy

=== From youth squad ===
No.	Name	Nationality	Position	Date of birth (age)	Signed from	Signed in	Contract ends	Apps.	Goals
	Mohamed Chentouf	(Morocco)	GK	10 January 2003 (age 23)	Academy	2021		0	(-0)
22	Bilal Bouserhane Akhedim	(Morocco)	DF		Academy	2022		1	0
24	Saber Yazidi	(Morocco)	DF	1 August 2001 (age 25)	Academy	2022		0	0
18	Badreddine Bakkali Mouden	(Morocco)	MF	8 February 2002 (age 24)	Academy	2021		2	0
30	Mourad Hmamou	(Morocco)	MF		Academy	2021		0	0
43	Saber Bachari	(Morocco)	MF		Academy	2022		0	0
66	Mohamed Yassine Dihaz	(Morocco)	MF	1 January 2003 (age 23)	Academy	2022		5	0
19	Hamza El Ibrahimi	(Morocco)	FW		Academy	2021		1	0
33	Bilal El Hankouri	(Morocco)	FW	4 May 2001 (age 25)	Academy	2022		1	0

== Transfers ==
=== In ===
No.	Pos	Player	Transferred from	Fee	Date	Source
17	FW	(Morocco) Hamdi Laachir	RS Berkane	Free transfer	13 August 2021	
28	DF	(Morocco) Abdelatif Noussir	MA Tétouan	Free transfer	14 August 2021	
31	FW	(Morocco) Youssef Benali	(France) Bourges Foot	Free transfer	18 August 2021	
7	FW	(Morocco) Ahmad Hamoudan	(Qatar) Umm Salal SC	Loan return	20 August 2021	
21	MF	(Algeria) Abdellah El Moudene	MC Oujda	Free transfer	24 August 2021	
9	FW	(Morocco) Mouad Ajandouz	Mohammed VI Football Academy	Free transfer	24 August 2021	
70	MF	(Morocco) Hamza Hassani Boouia	CR Al Hoceima	Free transfer	4 September 2021	
14	MF	(Morocco) Habib Allah Dahmani	(Qatar) Muaither SC	Free transfer	4 September 2021	
24	DF	(France) Pape Paye	(France) FC Sochaux-Montbéliard	Free transfer	11 September 2021	

=== Out ===
No.	Pos	Player	Transferred to	Fee	Date	Source
93	DF	(Morocco) Mohamed Chibi	AS FAR	Free	2 August 2021	
16	MF	(Morocco) Ahmed Chentouf	HUS Agadir	Free	5 August 2021	
70	DF	(Morocco) Tarik Astati	Maghreb AS	Free	13 August 2021	
7	FW	(Morocco) Youssef Anouar	MC Oujda	Free	19 August 2021	
14	FW	(Morocco) Ibrahim Bezghoudi	Later Tihad AC	Free	1 August 2021	
22	DF	(Gabon) Stévy Nzambé		Free	1 August 2021	
25	MF	(Morocco) Anouar Jayed		Free	1 August 2021	
77	FW	(Democratic Republic of the Congo) Mukoko Batezadio		Free	1 August 2021	
19	MF	(Morocco) Marouane Nebouch	Maghreb AS	Free	10 September 2021	
24	DF	(France) Pape Paye		Free	6 January 2022	
2	MF	(Morocco) Anas El Asbahi	(Sweden) Jönköpings Södra IF	Free	March 2022	

== Technical staff ==
Position	Name
First team head coach	(France) Bernard Casoni
Assistant coach	(France) Alain Durand
Fitness coach	(France) Thomas Gornouec
Goalkeeping coach	(Morocco) Mohammed Bestara

until 2 November 2021

Position	Name
Interim manager	(Morocco) Jaafar R'kyek
Assistant coach	(Morocco) Abdelouahed Belqassem

until 30 November 2021

Position	Name
First team head coach	(Argentina) Miguel Ángel Gamondi
Assistant coach	(Morocco) Tariq Chihab
Assistant coach	(Morocco) Jaafar R'kyek
Assistant coach	(Morocco) Abdelouahed Belqassem
Fitness coach	(Morocco) Rachid Blej
Goalkeeping coach	(Morocco) Mohammed Bestara
Performance analyst	(Morocco) Ahmed Zekhnini

until 17 April 2022

Position	Name
First team head coach	(Spain) (Morocco) Juan Pedro Benali
Assistant coach	(Spain) Ángel Viadero
Assistant coach	(Morocco) Abdelouahed Belqassem
Fitness coach	(Morocco) Rachid Blej
Goalkeeping coach	(Morocco) Mohammed Bestara
Performance analyst	(Morocco) Ahmed Zekhnini

== Pre-season and friendlies ==
27 August 2021 1	IR Tanger (Morocco)	3–1	(Morocco) Stade Marocain	Tangier, Morocco
17:00 UTC+1	Saroukh (pen.); Ijroten; Ould El Hamra		Goal	Stadium: Stade Village Ziaten

31 August 2021 2	IR Tanger (Morocco)	2–0	(Morocco) AS Salé	Tangier, Morocco
17:00 UTC+1	El Ouahabi; Benali (pen.)			Stadium: Stade Village Ziaten

4 September 2021 3	IR Tanger (Morocco)	1–1	(Morocco) AS FAR	Tangier, Morocco
16:00 UTC+1	Akhrif		El Khaloui 25'	Stadium: Stade Ibn Batouta

8 September 2021 4	IR Tanger (Morocco)	5–0	(Morocco) CS Ajax Tanger	Tangier, Morocco
17:00 UTC+1	Aklidou; El Moudene; Méyé; Laachir			Stadium: Stade Village Ziaten

12 December 2021 5	OC Khouribga (Morocco)	1–0	(Morocco) IR Tanger	Rabat, Morocco
15:00 UTC+1	El Fatouaki			Stadium: Appendix Prince Moulay Abdellah Stadium

12 January 2022 6	IR Tanger (Morocco)	2–0	(Morocco) R Moh Paco	Tangier, Morocco
--:-- UTC+1				Stadium: Stade Village Ziaten

15 January 2022 7	IR Tanger (Morocco)	1–1	(Morocco) MA Tétouan	Tangier, Morocco
12:00 UTC+1	Ijroten (pen.)		Khannouss	Stadium: Stade Ibn Batouta

22 January 2022 8	IR Tanger (Morocco)	1–1	(Morocco) AS FAR	Tangier, Morocco
15:00 UTC+1	Hamoudan (pen.)		Sadaoui 80'	Stadium: Stade Village Ziaten

28 January 2022 9	Fath US (Morocco)	1–1	(Morocco) IR Tanger	Rabat, Morocco
16:00 UTC+1	Maouhoub		Hassani	Stadium: Stade Moulay Hassan

1 April 2022 10	SCC Mohammédia (Morocco)	1–0	(Morocco) IR Tanger	Mohammédia, Morocco
15:00 UTC	Goal			Stadium: Stade El Bachir

29 May 2022 11	IR Tanger (Morocco)	1–2	(Morocco) Raja CA	Tangier, Morocco
10:30 UTC+1	Ijroten		Benjdida	Stadium: Stade Ibn Batouta

8 June 2022 12	AS FAR (Morocco)	1–1	(Morocco) IR Tanger	Salé, Morocco
16:00 UTC+1	Goal		Hassani	Stadium: Sports Center of FAR

== Competitions ==
Win Draw Loss

=== Overview ===
Competition	First match	Last match	Starting round	Final position	Record							
Competition	First match	Last match	Starting round	Final position	Pld	W	D	L	GF	GA	GD	Win %
Botola	12 September 2021	5 July 2022	Matchday 1	13th	30	8	9	13	31	41	−10	26.67
Throne Cup	13 March 2022	20 March 2022	Round of 32	Round of 16	2	1	0	1	1	1	+0	50.00
Total					32	9	9	14	32	42	−10	28.13

Last updated: 5 July 2022.
Source: Competitions

=== Botola ===
==== Standings ====
Pos	Team	Pld	W	D	L	GF	GA	GD	Pts	Qualification or relegation
11	SCC Mohammédia	30	8	10	12	27	32	−5	34 (Note: Head-to-head: Chabab Mohammédia: 6 points, Hassania Agadir: 0 point.)	
12	Hassania Agadir	30	9	7	14	26	30	−4	34	
13	Ittihad Tanger	30	8	9	13	31	41	−10	33 (Note: Head-to-head: Ittihad Tanger: 4 points, Mouloudia Oujda: 1 point.)	
14	MC Oujda	30	7	12	11	35	38	−3	33	
15	Rapide Oued Zem (R)	30	7	8	15	19	39	−20	29	Relegation to Botola 2

Source: FRMF.ma
Rules for classification: 1) Points; 2a) Head-to-head goal difference if they are two teams with equal points; 2b) Goal difference if they are more than two teams with equal points; 3) Number of wins; 4) Goals scored; 5) Play-off between involved teams.
(R) Relegated

==== Results summary ====
Overall								Home						Away					
Pld	W	D	L	GF	GA	GD	Pts	W	D	L	GF	GA	GD	W	D	L	GF	GA	GD
30	8	9	13	31	41	−10	33	5	7	3	16	14	+2	3	2	10	15	27	−12

Last updated: 5 July 2022.
Source: goalzz.com

==== Results by round ====
Round	1	2	3	4	5	6	7	8	9	10	11	12	13	14	15	16	17	18	19	20	21	22	23	24	25	26	27	28	29	30
Ground	A	H	A	H	A	H	H	A	H	A	H	A	H	A	H	H	A	H	A	H	A	A	H	A	H	A	H	A	H	A
Result	L	D	L	L	W	L	D	L	W	L	W	W	W	L	W	D	L	L	L	W	L	W	D	D	D	L	D	L	D	D
Position	14	12	15	16	12	15	15	15	14	14	11	9	8	10	8	8	10	11	12	11	12	12	12	12	12	12	12	12	13	13

Updated to match(es) played on 5 July 2022. Source: Botola
A = Away; H = Home; W = Win; D = Draw; L = Loss

==== Matches ====
12 September 2021 1	Wydad AC	2–0	IR Tanger	Casablanca
17:00 UTC+1	Msuva 8'; Comara (yellow card) 21'; El Moutaraji 47'; Jabrane (yellow card) 62'; Daoudi (yellow card) 79'	Report	Laachir (yellow card) 33'	Stadium: Stade Mohamed V Attendance: 0 Referee: Nabil Benrkiya

18 September 2021 2	IR Tanger	1–1	SCC Mohammédia	Tanger
19:15 UTC+1	Méyé 5'; Jarfi (yellow card) 16'	Report	Achchakir (yellow card) 36'; El Wasti 52' (yellow card) 90'; Nassik (yellow card) 60'	Stadium: Stade Ibn Batouta; Attendance: 0 Referee: Samir Guezzaz

24 September 2021 3	OC Khouribga	1–0	IR Tanger	Khouribga
17:00 UTC+1	Amaanan (yellow card) 44'; El Mouatani (yellow card) 46'; Seakanyeng (yellow card) 50' (goal) 57'; Oggadi (yellow card) 64'; Hajjar (yellow card) 82'	Report	Bemammer (yellow card) 45+4'; Méyé (yellow card) 46'; Sadil (yellow card) 49'	Stadium: Complexe OCP; Attendance: 0 Referee: Daki Reddad

28 September 2021 4	IR Tanger	0–1	Raja CA	Tanger
17:00 UTC+1	Bemammer (yellow card) 78'; Noussir (yellow card) 89'	Report	Benhalib 19'; El Wardi (yellow card) 47'	Stadium: Stade Ibn Batouta; Attendance: 0 Referee: Yassine Bouselim

2 October 2021 5	JS Soualem	0–2	IR Tanger	Berrechid
21:30 UTC+1	Joulale (yellow card) 19'	Report	Benali 7'; Konaté (yellow card) 61'; Hamoudan (yellow card) 69'; Aklidou (yellow card) 86'; Sadil (yellow card) 90+2'; Ijroten 90+3' (yellow card) 90+4'	Stadium: Stade Errazi; Attendance: 0 Referee: Nabil Benrkiya

19 October 2021 6	IR Tanger	0–2	AS FAR	Tanger
20:30 UTC+1	El Moudene (yellow card) 14'; El Mejhed (red card) 16'; Bemammer (yellow card) 70'	Report	Hrimat (yellow card) 37'; Khafi 45+6'; Sabaouni (yellow card) 66'; Slim 90+1' (pen.)	Stadium: Stade Ibn Batouta; Attendance: 0 Referee: Karim Sabry

26 October 2021 7	IR Tanger	1–1	MC Oujda	Tanger
18:15 UTC+1	Ijroten 61'; Khallati (penalty missed)	Report	Bahrou 17'; Bettache (yellow card) 45'; Semmoumy (yellow card) 53'; Bahi (yellow card) 65'; Khafifi (yellow card) 90+2'	Stadium: Stade Ibn Batouta; Attendance: 0 Referee: Jallal Jiyed

31 October 2021 8	RS Berkane	4–1	IR Tanger	Berkane
16:00 UTC+1	Dayo 4'; El Bahraoui 48', 77'; Mokadem (yellow card) 67'; Lukombe 68'	Report	Hamoudan 7'	Stadium: Stade Municipal; Attendance: 0 Referee: Mostafa Kechaf

4 November 2021 9	IR Tanger	4–2	DH Jadidi	Tanger
16:00 UTC+1	Hamoudan 1'; Al Aiz (yellow card) 17'; Méyé 30', 56' (pen.); Ijroten 43'; Aarab (yellow card) 45'; Konaté (yellow card) 75'; El Mejhed (yellow card) 88'	Report	Rabja (red card) 6'; Gaadaoui (yellow card) 25'; Hadraf 66', 74'	Stadium: Stade Ibn Batouta; Attendance: 0 Referee: Karim Sabry

7 November 2021 10	Fath US	2–1	IR Tanger	Rabat
18:15 UTC+1	Bach 45+1'; Ouattara (yellow card) 55'; Karnass 68'; Limouri (yellow card) 89'; Zerhouni (yellow card) 90+4'	Report	Ijroten 83'	Stadium: Stade Moulay Hassan; Attendance: 0 Referee: Jamal Belbassri

21 November 2021 11	IR Tanger	3–1	RC Oued Zem	Tanger
20:30 UTC+1	Méyé 5', 49', 53'; El Moudene (yellow card) 75'	Report	Marchad 45' (pen.) (yellow card) 54'	Stadium: Stade Ibn Batouta; Attendance: 0 Referee: Samir Guezzaz

25 November 2021 12	CAY Berrechid	0–3	IR Tanger	Berrechid
20:30 UTC+1	Aznabet (yellow card) 76'	Report	Méyé (penalty missed) 86'; Benali 54'; Noussir (yellow card) 56'; El Mejhed (yellow card) 70'; El Moudene 83'; Khallati (yellow card) 84'; Akhrif (yellow card) 84'	Stadium: Stade Municipal; Attendance: 0 Referee: Mohamed Nhayeh

19 December 2021 13	IR Tanger	1–0	OC Safi	Tanger
20:30 UTC+1	Aarab 61'	Report	Michte (yellow card) 30'; El Bounagate (yellow card) 47'; Belfadla (yellow card) 79'	Stadium: Stade Ibn Batouta; Attendance: 0 Referee: Jallal Jiyed

25 December 2021 14	Maghreb AS	2–1	IR Tanger	Fez
20:30 UTC+1	Diarra 45'; Aguerdoum (yellow card) 45+2'; Astati (yellow card) 49'; Aina (yellow card) 87'; Ajaraie 90+3' (yellow card) 90+4'; El Janati (yellow card) 90+5'	Report	Méyé 6' (pen.); Noussir (yellow card) 37'	Stadium: Stade Hassan-II; Attendance: 0 Referee: Mohamed Nhayeh

28 December 2021 15	IR Tanger	1–0	HUS Agadir	Tanger
18:15 UTC+1	Bemammer (yellow card) 41'; Méyé 55'; Benali (yellow card) 58'; Laachir (yellow card) 71'; Aarab (yellow card) 84'	Report	Moussadak (yellow card) 59'; Diop (yellow card) 73'	Stadium: Stade Ibn Batouta; Attendance: 0 Referee: Hicham Tamssamani

5 February 2022 16	IR Tanger	0–0	Wydad AC	Tanger
16:00 UTC+1	Abdel Mutalib (yellow card) 21'; El Ouahabi (yellow card) 61'; Hamoudan (yellow card) 68'	Report	Ferhane (yellow card) 26'; El Hassouni (yellow card) 48'; Comara (yellow card) 80'; Tsoumou (yellow card) 90+5'	Stadium: Stade Ibn Batouta; Attendance: 0 Referee: Yassine Bouslim

12 February 2022 17	SCC Mohammédia	3–0	IR Tanger	Mohammédia
18:00 UTC+1	Lamlioui 3'; El Keraa (yellow card) 16' (goal) 37'; Boulacsoute 73'	Report	Bemammer (yellow card) 40' (yellow-red card) 43'	Stadium: Stade El Bachir; Attendance: 0 Referee: Samir Guezzaz

20 February 2022 18	IR Tanger	0–2	OC Khouribga	Tanger
20:30 UTC+1	Konaté (yellow card) 29'	Report	Haffari 32'; Grada (yellow card) 39'; Seakanyeng 82'	Stadium: Stade Ibn Batouta; Attendance: 0 Referee: Omar Chddad

1 March 2022 19	Raja CA	1–0	IR Tanger	Casablanca
20:30 UTC+1	Nahiri (yellow card) 38'; Soukhane (yellow card) 49'; Benjdida 77'	Report	Sadil (yellow card) 34'; Laachir (yellow card) 68'; Al Aiz (yellow card) 72'	Stadium: Stade Mohamed V Attendance: 35,173. Referee: Hamza El Fareq

6 March 2022 20	IR Tanger	2–1	JS Soualem	Tanger
18:15 UTC+1	Al Aiz (yellow card) 20'; Méyé 45+2', 90+3' (yellow card) 90+4'	Report	Kandil (yellow card) 23'; Kordani (red card) 26'; Merzaq Alaoui (yellow card) 35'; Riahi 54'; Sahd (yellow card) 67'; El Msane (yellow card) 77'; Hariss (yellow card) 90+1'	Stadium: Stade Ibn Batouta; Attendance: 8,000. Referee: Hicham Tamssamani

15 April 2022 21	AS FAR	4–1	IR Tanger	Rabat
22:00 UTC+1	Khafi 3', 24'; Diney (yellow card) 64'; Fati 78'; Ennafati 83'; Sabaouni (yellow card) 90'	Report	Hamoudan 60'; Al Aiz (yellow card) 66'	Stadium: Prince Moulay Abdellah Stadium; Attendance: 0. Referee: Mohamed Nhayeh

22 April 2022 22	MC Oujda	2–3	IR Tanger	Oujda
22:00 UTC+1	Diakite 35' (pen.); Karkache (yellow card) 54'; Jaadi 89'; Khafifi (yellow card) 90+5'	Report	Khafifi 3' (o.g.); Hamoudan 8'; Konaté (yellow card) 61' (goal) 75'; Aarab (yellow card) 72'; Méyé (penalty missed)	Stadium: Honneur Stadium; Referee: Yassine Bouslim

16 May 2022 24	DH Jadidi	2–2	IR Tanger	El Jadida
18:15 UTC+1	A. Hadraf 20' (pen.) (yellow card) 59'; Chichane (yellow card) 47'; El Jaaouani (yellow card) 66'; Juma 82'; Lakhmidi (yellow card) 85'; Benkhaled (yellow card) 90+7' (yellow card)	Report	Bemammer 2'; Hamoudan (penalty missed); Laachir 64'; Aklidou (yellow card) 90+2'	Stadium: Stade El Abdi; Referee: Redouane Jiyed

25 May 2022 23	IR Tanger	0–0	RS Berkane	Tanger
20:30 UTC+1	Benali (yellow card) 45'	Report	El Moudane (yellow card) 28'; Camara (yellow card) 62'; Regragui (yellow card) 66'	Stadium: Stade Ibn Batouta; Referee: Daki Reddad
Note: The match, originally scheduled for 8 May 2022, was pushed back because of the involvement of Nahdat Berkane at the 2021–22 CAF Confederation Cup, The match was rescheduled for 19 May 2022, but was postponed again after Nahdat Berkane qualified to the 2022 CAF Confederation Cup Final.

15 June 2022 25	IR Tanger	1–1	Fath US	Tanger
17:00 UTC+1	Laachir 23' (pen.)	Report	Benabid (yellow card) 21'; Karnass (yellow card) 45+1'; Nanah 71'; Ouattara (yellow card) 75'	Stadium: Stade Ibn Batouta; Referee: Mohamed Nhiyeh

18 June 2022 26	RC Oued Zem	1–0	IR Tanger	Khouribga
21:30 UTC+1	Marchad 74'; Boujad (yellow card) 75'; Mockey (yellow card) 90+5'	Report	Benali (yellow card) 6'; El Ouahabi (yellow card) 43'; El Mejhed (yellow card) +4'	Stadium: Complexe OCP; Referee: Jamal Belbassri

22 June 2022 27	IR Tanger	1–1	CAY Berrechid	Tanger
21:30 UTC+1	Méyé 86'; Abdel Mutalib (yellow card) 89' (yellow-red card) 90+5'; Akhrif (yellow card) 90'; Sadil (yellow card) 90+8'	Report	Chaibi (yellow card) 21'; Najm Eddine (yellow card) 56'; El Idrissi (yellow card) 79'; Aznabet (yellow card) 85'; Ayat Ahmed (yellow card) 86'; Chaina (yellow card) 89' (goal) 90+1'	Stadium: Stade Ibn Batouta; Referee: Mostafa Kechaf

25 June 2022 28	OC Safi	3–1	IR Tanger	Safi
18:00 UTC+1	Naji (yellow card) 19'; Mehri 32'; Ouattara 54' (pen.) (yellow card) 55'; Majid (yellow card) 65'; Acha (yellow card) 67' (goal) 90+4'; Najari (yellow card) 88'	Report	Benali 8' (yellow card) 45'; El Ouahabi (yellow card) 10' (yellow-red card) 87'; Dahmani (yellow card) 27'; Bemammer (yellow card) 53'; Aklidou (red card) 90+8'	Stadium: Stade El Massira; Attendance: 12,000; Referee: Moncef Zine Alaoui

29 June 2022 29	IR Tanger	1–1	Maghreb AS	Tanger
18:00 UTC+1	Dahmani (yellow card) 18'; Laachir (penalty missed); Abdel Mutalib (yellow card) 59'; Ijroten 69' (yellow card) 90+4'; Hassani (yellow card) 77'; Bemammer (yellow card) 90+2'	Report	Majid (yellow card) 17'; Dahbi 29'; Abdoulaye Diarra (yellow card) 38'; Yechou (yellow card) 58'; El Ouadghiri (yellow card) 90+1'	Stadium: Stade Ibn Batouta; Referee: Daki Reddad

5 July 2022 30	HUS Agadir	0–0	IR Tanger	Agadir
18:00 UTC+1	Kimaoui (yellow card) 15'	Report	Al Aiz (yellow card) 27'; Sadil (yellow card) 68'	Stadium: Stade Adrar; Referee: Omar Cheddad

==== Results overview ====
Locations of the 2021–22 Botola teams

Win Draw Loss

Region	Team	Home score	Away score	Aggregate
Casablanca-Settat	CAY Berrechid	1–1	0–3	4–1
Casablanca-Settat	DH Jadida	4–2	2–2	6–4
Casablanca-Settat	JS Soualem	2–1	0–2	4–1
Casablanca-Settat	Raja CA	0–1	1–0	0–2
Casablanca-Settat	SCC Mohammédia	1–1	3–0	1–4
Casablanca-Settat	Wydad AC	0–0	2–0	0–2
Oriental	MC Oujda	1–1	2–3	4–3
Oriental	RS Berkane	0–0	4–1	1–4
Béni Mellal-Khénifra	OC Khouribga	0–2	1–0	0–3
Béni Mellal-Khénifra	RC Oued Zem	3–1	1–0	3–2
Rabat-Salé-Kénitra	AS FAR	0–2	4–1	1–6
Rabat-Salé-Kénitra	Fath US	1–1	2–1	2–3
Fès-Meknès	Maghreb AS	1–1	2–1	2–3
Marrakech-Safi	OC Safi	1–0	3–1	2–3
Souss-Massa	HUS Agadir	1–0	0–0	1–0

=== Throne Cup ===
13 March 2022 Round of 32	IR Tanger	1–0	CC Fath A Casablanca	Tangier
18:15 UTC+1	El Moudene (yellow card) 81'; Konaté 90+5'	Report	Dali (yellow card) 56'; Elamiri (yellow card) 88'	Stadium: Stade Ibn Batouta; Attendance: 15,000. Referee: Abderrahim Arrakhiz

20 March 2022 Round of 16	AS Mansouria	1–0	IR Tanger	El Mansouria
15:00 UTC+1	Modeste 11'; (yellow card) 56'; (yellow card) 84'; (yellow card) 90+5'	Report	Bemammer (yellow card) 59'; Al Aiz (yellow card) 80'	Stadium: Mansouria Municipal Stadium; Attendance: 0. Referee: Saad Warid

== Statistics ==
=== Squad appearances and goals ===
Last updated on 5 July 2022.

No.	Pos	Nat	Player	Total		Botola		Throne Cup	
No.	Pos	Nat	Player	Apps	Goals	Apps	Goals	Apps	Goals
Goalkeepers
12	GK	(Morocco) MAR	Imad Askar	0	0	0	(0)	0	(0)
55	GK	(Morocco) MAR	Tarik Ouattah	3	-3	2+1	(-3)	0	(0)
65	GK	(Morocco) MAR	Hicham El Mejhed	30	-38	28	(-37)	2	(-1)
	GK	(Morocco) MAR	Mohamed Chentouf	0	0	0	(0)	0	(0)
Defenders
3	DF	(Morocco) MAR	Hatim El Ouahabi	23	0	18+3	0	1+1	0
4	DF	(Morocco) MAR	Hakim Aklidou	14	0	9+5	0	0	0
13	DF	(Morocco) MAR	Oussama Al Aiz	15	0	9+4	0	2	0
15	DF	(Morocco) MAR	Ayoub Jarfi	25	0	17+6	0	2	0
20	DF	(Morocco) MAR	Mohamed Aymen Sadil	16	0	10+5	0	1	0
22	DF	(Morocco) MAR	Bilal Bouserhane Akhdim	1	0	0+1	0	0	0
28	DF	(Morocco) MAR	Abdelatif Noussir	19	0	15+4	0	0	0
29	DF	(Senegal) SEN	El Hadji Youssoupha Konaté	29	2	23+4	1	2	1
40	DF	(Morocco) MAR	Mehdi Khallati	12	0	9+3	0	0	0
Midfielders
5	MF	(Morocco) MAR	Mohammed Ali Bemammer	28	1	23+3	1	2	0
6	MF	(Morocco) MAR	Nouaman Aarab	27	1	23+4	1	0	0
8	MF	(Morocco) MAR	Faouzi Abdel Mutalib	16	0	12+2	0	2	0
10	MF	(Morocco) MAR	Kahled Serroukh	14	0	8+5	0	0+1	0
14	MF	(Morocco) MAR	Habib Allah Dahmani	5	0	2+3	0	0	0
21	MF	(Algeria) ALG	Abdellah El Moudene	20	1	15+4	1	0+1	0
24	MF	(Morocco) MAR	Saber Yazidi	0	0	0	0	0	0
30	MF	(Morocco) MAR	Mourad Hmamou	0	0	0	0	0	0
43	MF	(Morocco) MAR	Saber Bachari	0	0	0	0	0	0
66	MF	(Morocco) MAR	Mohamed Yassine Dihaz	5	0	0+5	0	0	0
70	MF	(Morocco) MAR	Hamza Hassani Boouia	12	0	7+4	0	0+1	0
Forwards
7	FW	(Morocco) MAR	Ahmad Hamoudan	23	4	20+1	4	1+1	0
9	FW	(Morocco) MAR	Mouad Ajandouz	0	0	0	0	0	0
11	FW	(Gabon) GAB	Axel Méyé	23	12	19+2	12	2	0
17	FW	(Morocco) MAR	Hamdi Laachir	27	2	18+7	2	1+1	0
18	FW	(Morocco) MAR	Badreddine Bekkali Moudin	1	0	0+1	0	0	0
19	FW	(Morocco) MAR	Hamza El Ibrahimi	0	0	0	0	0	0
23	FW	(Morocco) MAR	Abdellatif Akhrif	19	0	2+15	0	2	0
31	FW	(Morocco) MAR	Youssef Benali	29	3	22+5	3	2	0
33	FW	(Morocco) MAR	Bilal El Hankouri	1	0	0+1	0	0	0
76	FW	(Morocco) MAR	Taoufik Ijroten	27	5	16+9	5	0+2	0
Players who have made an appearance or had a squad number this season but have left the club
24	DF	(France) FRA	Pape Paye	7	0	3+4	0	0	0
2	MF	(Morocco) MAR	Anas El Asbahi	9	0	1+8	0	0	0

- = ineligible players

=== Goalscorers ===
Rank	No.	Pos	Nat	Name	Botola	Throne Cup	Total
1	11	FW	(Gabon)	Axel Méyé	12	0	12
2	76	FW	(Morocco)	Taoufik Ijroten	5	0	5
3	7	FW	(Morocco)	Ahmad Hamoudan	4	0	4
4	31	FW	(Morocco)	Youssef Benali	3	0	3
5	17	FW	(Morocco)	Hamdi Laachir	2	0	2
5	29	DF	(Senegal)	Youssoupha Konaté	1	1	2
7	21	MF	(Algeria)	Abdellah El Moudene	1	0	1
7	6	MF	(Morocco)	Nouaman Aarab	1	0	1
7	5	MF	(Morocco)	Mohammed Ali Bemammer	1	0	1
Own goals					1	0	1
TOTAL					31	1	32

=== Assists ===
Rank	No.	Pos	Nat	Name	Botola	Throne Cup	Total
1	7	FW	(Morocco)	Ahmad Hamoudan	8	0	8
2	31	FW	(Morocco)	Youssef Benali	4	0	4
3	76	FW	(Morocco)	Taoufik Ijroten	3	0	3
4	21	MF	(Algeria)	Abdellah El Moudene	2	0	2
4	5	MF	(Morocco)	Mohammed Ali Bemammer	2	0	2
4	6	MF	(Morocco)	Nouaman Aarab	2	0	2
7	17	FW	(Morocco)	Hamdi Laachir	1	0	1
7	28	DF	(Morocco)	Abdelatif Noussir	1	0	1
7	11	FW	(Gabon)	Axel Méyé	1	0	1
7	4	DF	(Morocco)	Hakim Aklidou	1	0	1
7	3	DF	(Morocco)	Hatim El Ouahabi	1	0	1
TOTAL					26	0	26

=== Hat-tricks ===
Player	Against	Result	Date	Competition
(Gabon) Axel Méyé	RC Oued Zem	3–1 (H)	21 November 2021	2021–22 Botola

(H) – Home; (A) – Away

=== Clean sheets ===
Last updated on 5 July 2022.

No	Name	Botola	Coupe du Trône	Total
12	(Morocco) Askar	0/0	0/0	0/0
55	(Morocco) Ouattah	1/3	0/0	1/3
65	(Morocco) El Mejhed	6/27	1/2	6/27
Total		7/30	1/2	8/32

=== Disciplinary record ===
N	P	Nat.	Name	Botola			Coupe du Trône			Total			Notes
N	P	Nat.	Name	Yellow card	Second yellow card	Red card	Yellow card	Second yellow card	Red card	Yellow card	Second yellow card	Red card	Notes
3	DF	(Morocco)	Hatim El Ouahabi	2	1					2	1		
4	DF	(Morocco)	Hakim Aklidou	2		1				2		1	
5	MF	(Morocco)	Mohammed Ali Bemammer	6	1		1			7	1		
6	MF	(Morocco)	Nouaman Aarab	3						3			
7	FW	(Morocco)	Ahmad Hamoudan	2						2			
8	MF	(Morocco)	Faouzi Abdel Mutalib	2	1					2	1		
11	FW	(Gabon)	Axel Méyé	2						2			Banned - was stopped for the remainder of the football season for making an unsportsmanlike move towards the fans in the match against Youssoufia Berrechid.; Banned on 24 June 2021
13	DF	(Morocco)	Oussama Al Aiz	5			1			6			
14	DF	(Morocco)	Habib Allah Dahmani	2						2			
15	DF	(Morocco)	Ayoub Jarfi	1						1			
17	FW	(Morocco)	Hamdi Laachir	3						3			
20	DF	(Morocco)	Mohamed Aymen Sadil	5						5			
21	MF	(Algeria)	Abdellah El Moudene	2			1			3			
23	FW	(Morocco)	Abdellatif Akhrif	2						2			
28	DF	(Morocco)	Abdelatif Noussir	3						3			
29	DF	(Senegal)	El Hadji Youssoupha Konaté	4						4			
31	FW	(Morocco)	Youssef Benali	4						4			
40	DF	(Morocco)	Mehdi Khallati	1						1			
65	GK	(Morocco)	Hicham El Mejhed	3		1				3		1	
70	MF	(Morocco)	Hamza Hassani Boouia	1						1			
76	FW	(Morocco)	Taoufik Ijroten	2						2			

Last updated: 5 July 2022
Source: kooora.com
Only competitive matches
(yellow card) = Number of bookings; (second yellow card) = Number of sending offs after a second yellow card; (red card) = Number of sending offs by a direct red card.

=== Injury record ===
N	P	Nat.	Name	Type	Status	Source	Match	Inj. Date	Ret. Date
9	FW	(Morocco)	Mouad Ajandouz				in training	Pre-Season	Unknown
40	DF	(Morocco)	Mehdi Khallati				vs Wydad AC	12 September 2021	26 October 2021
15	DF	(Morocco)	Ayoub Jarfi				vs SCC Mohammédia	18 September 2021	2 October 2021
3	DF	(Morocco)	Hatim El Ouahabi				vs SCC Mohammédia	18 September 2021	26 October 2021
17	FW	(Morocco)	Hamdi Laachir	Shoulder injury			vs MC Oujda	26 October 2021	2 December 2021
28	DF	(Morocco)	Abdelatif Noussir	Calf muscle stretch			vs MC Oujda	26 October 2021	25 November 2021
7	FW	(Morocco)	Ahmad Hamoudan	A bruise on the right leg			vs DH Jadidi	4 November 2021	7 November 2021
76	FW	(Morocco)	Taoufik Ijroten	Right thigh muscle rupture			vs Fath US	7 November 2021	28 December 2021
40	DF	(Morocco)	Mehdi Khallati	A bruise in the upper right thigh			in training	17 November 2021	25 November 2021
9	FW	(Morocco)	Mouad Ajandouz	Left thigh injury			in training	17 November 2021	January 2022
5	MF	(Morocco)	Mohammed Ali Bemammer	Right thigh injury			in training	17 November 2021	25 November 2021
9	FW	(Morocco)	Mouad Ajandouz	A thigh injury (surgery)			in training	28 February 2022	Unknown
28	DF	(Morocco)	Abdelatif Noussir				vs Raja CA	1 March 2022	16 May 2022
40	DF	(Morocco)	Mehdi Khallati	A bruise in the upper right thigh			in training	March 2022	16 May 2022
6	MF	(Morocco)	Nouaman Aarab	Muscular injury			vs JS Soualem	6 March 2022	21 March 2022
21	MF	(Algeria)	Abdellah El Moudene				vs CC Fath A Casablanca	13 March 2022	22 April 2022
11	FW	(Gabon)	Axel Méyé	Left thigh injury			vs AS Mansoria	20 March 2022	15 April 2022
20	DF	(Morocco)	Mohamed Aymen Sadil	slight muscle spasm			in training	4 April 2022	15 April 2022
7	FW	(Morocco)	Ahmad Hamoudan	Strong injury to the rib cage			vs RS Berkane	25 May 2022	29 June 2022

- Player is injured
- Player has recovered from injury
Last updated: 5 July 2022
Source: clubirt kooora.com

== See also ==
- 2015–16 IR Tanger season
- 2016–17 IR Tanger season
- 2017–18 IR Tanger season
- 2018–19 IR Tanger season
- 2019–20 IR Tanger season
- 2020–21 IR Tanger season
