= 2020–21 IR Tanger season =

Tanger
2020–21 season
- President: Abdelhamid Abarchan
- Manager: Driss El Mrabet
- Stadium: Stade Ibn Batouta
- Botola: 8th
- Moroccan Throne Cup: Round of 16
- Top goalscorer: League: Axel Méyé (12 goals); All: Axel Méyé (13 goals)
- Biggest win: 3–0 vs MC Oujda
- Biggest defeat: 4–1 vs RCA Zemamra; 0–3 vs Raja CA
Home colours	Away colours	Third colours
- All statistics correct as of 28 July 2021.

The 2020–21 season is Ittihad Riadi Tanger's 38th season in existence and the club's 22nd in the top flight of Moroccan football, and sixth consecutive.

== Kit ==
Supplier: Gloria Sport / Club Sponsor: front: Tanger-Med, back: Experience Majorel / League Sponsor: sleeves: Inwi.

Home	Away	Third

== Season review ==
=== October ===
On 16 October, Ittihad Tanger completed the transfer of 25-year-old gabonais forward Axel Méyé from Chabab Rif Al Hoceima on a three-year contract.

On 29 October, Ittihad Tanger announced the signing of Hakim Aklidou from Chabab Rif Al Hoceima on a three-year contract.

=== November ===
On 4 November, Ittihad Tanger reached an agreement with Wydad AC for the transfer of Sofian El Moudane for 2.5 million dirhams In addition to the player Anas El Asbahi contract.

On 5 November, the club announced that Driss El Mrabet would be the new head coach until 30 June 2023.

On 12 November, Ittihad Tanger announced the signing of Mohammed Ali Bemammer from AS FAR for two years.

On 30 November, Ittihad Tanger announced the signing of the former midfielder Kahled Saroukh from OC Khouribga on a three-year contract.

== Squad ==
As of match played 27 July 2021

No.	Name	Nationality	Position	Date of birth (age)	Signed from	Signed in	Contract ends	Apps.	Goals
Goalkeepers
33	Imad Askar	(Morocco)	GK	30 November 1999 (age 26)	MA Tétouan	2018		3	(-6)
55	Tarik Aouattah	(Morocco)	GK	7 September 1992 (age 34)	CR Al Hoceima	2017	2023	36	(-31)
65	Hicham El Mejhed (3rd captain)	(Morocco)	GK	9 April 1991 (age 35)	HUS Agadir	2018 (winter)	2023	69	(77)
Defenders
3	Hatim El Ouahabi	(Morocco)	DF	3 October 1999 (age 27)	Widad-Juventud	2017	2024	39	1
4	Hakim Aklidou	(Morocco)	DF	2 July 1997 (age 29)	CR Al Hoceima	2020	2023	7	0
13	Oussama Al Aiz	(Morocco)	DF	30 November 1999 (age 26)	Academy	2020		8	0
15	Ayoub Jarfi	(Morocco)	DF	4 March 1996 (age 30)	Academy	2016	2022	88	2
20	Mohamed Ayman Sadil	(Morocco)	DF	10 June 1994 (age 32)	Raja CA	2019	2022	34	0
22	Stévy Nzambé	(Gabon)	DF	4 September 1991 (age 35)	Mbabane Swallows	2019 (winter)	2021	17	1
29	El Hadji Youssoupha Konaté	(Senegal)	DF	6 May 1994 (age 32)	JS Saoura	2019	2022	56	2
40	Mehdi Khallati (vice-captain)	(Morocco)	DF	18 November 1991 (age 34)	AS FAR (A)	2019	2021	39	1
70	Tarik Astati	(Morocco)	DF	30 July 1991 (age 35)	DH Jadidi	2019	2021	57	3
93	Mohamed Chibi	(Morocco)	DF	21 January 1993 (age 33)	Free agent	2020 (winter)	2021	44	4
Midfielders
2	Anas El Asbahi	(Morocco)	MF	15 October 1993 (age 33)	Wydad AC	2020 (winter)	2023	29	0
5	Mohammed Ali Bemammer	(Morocco)	MF	19 November 1989 (age 36)	AS FAR	2020	2022	25	0
6	Nouaman Aarab (captain)	(Morocco)	MF	27 August 1990 (age 36)	CA Khénifra	2017	2023	103	4
8	Faouzi Abdel Mutalib	(Morocco)	MF	19 July 1993 (age 33)	CR Bernoussi	2019	2023	28	2
10	Kahled Saroukh	(Morocco)	MF	28 April 1990 (age 36)	OC Khouribga (A)	2020 (2)	2023	50	4
16	Ahmed Chentouf	(Morocco)	MF	5 December 1996 (age 29)	Academy	2015	2021	103	5
19	Marouane Nebouch	(Morocco)	MF	9 November 1999 (age 27)	Academy	2020		5	0
25	Anouar Jayed	(Morocco)	MF	10 December 1990 (age 35)	DH Jadidi	2019	2021	38	0
66	Yassine Asri	(Morocco)	MF	17 December 2000 (age 25)	Academy	2020		2	0
Forwards
7	Youssef Anouar	(Morocco)	FW	4 July 1990 (age 36)	Fath US	2019	2021	59	9
11	Axel Méyé	(Gabon)	FW	6 June 1995 (age 31)	CR Al Hoceima	2020	2023	30	13
14	Ibrahim Bezghoudi	(Morocco)	FW	7 June 1983 (age 43)	CAY Berrechid	2020 (winter)	2021	16	1
23	Abdellatif Akhrif	(Morocco)	FW	1 January 2000 (age 26)	Academy	2020		21	2
76	Taoufik Ijroten	(Morocco)	FW	13 April 1990 (age 36)	RS Berkane	2020 (winter)	2021	47	8
77	Mukoko Batezadio	(Democratic Republic of the Congo)	FW	24 October 1992 (age 34)	AS Vita Club	2019 (winter)	2021	67	1
Players who have left the club during the season
17	Younes Ed-dyb	(Morocco)	FW	1 July 1992 (age 34)	AFS Ouislane	2017 (winter)	2021	20	4

From youth squad
No.	Name	Nationality	Position	Date of birth (age)	Signed from	Signed in	Contract ends	Apps.	Goals
	Mohamed Chentouf	(Morocco)	GK	10 January 2003 (age 23)	Academy	2021		0	0
	Mohamed Yassine Dihaz	(Morocco)	MF	1 January 2003 (age 23)	Academy	2021		0	0
36	Nassim Regragui	(Morocco)	FW		Academy	2021		1	0
61	Badreddine Bekkali Mouden	(Morocco)	FW	8 February 2002 (age 24)	Academy	2021		1	0

On Loan
No.	Name	Nationality	Position	Date of birth (age)	Signed from	Signed in	Contract ends	Apps.	Goals	to	until
—	Ahmed Hammoudan	(Morocco)	FW	12 July 1992 (age 34)	FC Tétouan	2012	2022	102	15	Umm Salal	30 June 2021

== Transfers ==
=== In ===
No.	Pos	Player	Transferred from	Fee	Date	Source
—	FW	(Morocco) Ahmed Hammoudan	(Qatar) Al-Khor SC	Loan return	6 September 2020	
17	FW	(Morocco) Younes Ed-dyb	IZ Khemisset	Loan return	12 October 2020	
26	DF	(Gabon) Stévy Nzambé	(Iraq) Al-Zawraa SC	Loan return	12 October 2020	
9	FW	(Gabon) Axel Méyé	CR Al Hoceima	Undisclosed	16 October 2020	
4	DF	(Morocco) Hakim Aklidou	CR Al Hoceima	Free	29 October 2020	
2	MF	(Morocco) Anas El Asbahi	Wydad AC	Swap	4 November 2020	
5	MF	(Morocco) Mohammed Ali Bemammer	AS FAR	Free	12 November 2020	
10	MF	(Morocco) Kahled Saroukh	OC Khouribga	Free	30 November 2020	
—	FW	(Morocco) Ahmed Hammoudan	(Qatar) Al-Sailiya SC	Loan return	1 January 2021	

=== Out ===
No.	Pos	Player	Transferred to	Fee	Date	Source
—	DF	(Ivory Coast) Kassi Akesse Mathias	Free agent	Free Transfer	12 October 2020	
19	DF	(Ivory Coast) Mustapha Camara	Free agent	Contract termination	3 November 2020	
31	MF	(Morocco) Sofian El Moudane	Wydad AC	2.500.000 MAD (Note: In addition to the player Anas El Asbahi contract.)	4 November 2020	
7	FW	(Morocco) Mohamed El Amraoui	Later Kénitra AC	Contract termination	9 November 2020	
18	MF	(Morocco) Soufian Echaraf	RC Oued Zem	Free Transfer	16 November 2020	
23	DF	(Morocco) Reda Mhannaoui	AS FAR	Free Transfer	22 November 2020	
17	FW	(Morocco) Younes Ed-dyb	O Dcheira	Contract termination	28 January 2021	
Total				2.500.000 MAD		

=== Loans Out ===
No.	Pos	Player	to	Fee	Date	Source
—	FW	(Morocco) Ahmed Hammoudan	(Qatar) Al-Sailiya SC	Undisclosed	6 September 2020	
—	FW	(Morocco) Ahmed Hammoudan	(Qatar) Umm Salal SC	Undisclosed	4 January 2021	

=== Released ===
No.	Pos	Player	Joined	Date	Source
4	MF	(Morocco) Kamal Ait El Haj	Free agent	23 November 2020	
21	FW	(Morocco) Abdelghani Mouaoui	Later OC Khouribga	23 November 2020	

== Technical staff ==
Position	Name
First team head coach	(Morocco) Driss El Mrabet
Assistant coach	(Morocco) Abdessamad Rafik
2nd Assistant coach	(Morocco) Ahmed Salah
Fitness coach	(Morocco) Rachid Blej
Goalkeeping coach	(Morocco) Mohammed Bestara

== Pre-season and friendlies ==
7 November 2020 1	IR Tanger (Morocco)	0–0	(Morocco) IZ Khemisset	Tangier, Morocco
17:00 UTC+1				Stadium: Stade Village Ziaten

11 November 2020 2	ANS Agadir (Morocco)	1–2	(Morocco) IR Tanger	Agadir, Morocco
16:30 UTC+1	Goal		Chentouf 23'; Ijroten (penalty missed) 48'	Stadium: Adrar stadium annex

14 November 2020 3	USM Aït Melloul (Morocco)	0–3	(Morocco) IR Tanger	Agadir, Morocco
11:00 UTC+1			Méyé 8', 20'; Ed-dyb 65'	Stadium: Adrar stadium annex

18 November 2020 4	O Dcheira (Morocco)	1–2	(Morocco) IR Tanger	Agadir, Morocco
16:30 UTC+1	68'	Report	Méyé 27', 43'	Stadium: Adrar stadium annex

21 November 2020 5	HUS Agadir (Morocco)	2–2	(Morocco) IR Tanger	Agadir, Morocco
16:30 UTC+1	El Fahli 1' (pen.), 90' (pen.)		Jayed 58'; Aliouin 85' (o.g.)	Stadium: Adrar stadium annex

22 November 2020 6	Adrar UAS (Morocco)	2–2	(Morocco) IR Tanger	Agadir, Morocco
--:-- UTC+1	Goal		Ed-dyb 65'; Mukoko 90'	Stadium: Adrar stadium annex

26 November 2020 7	Morocco A'	1–1	(Morocco) IR Tanger	Salé, Morocco
16:00 UTC+1	Hadraf 25'	Report	El Asbahi 42'	Stadium: Complexe Mohammed VI

27 January 2021 8	IR Tanger (Morocco)	1–1	(Morocco) MA Tétouan	Tangier, Morocco
15:00 UTC+1	Méyé (pen.)		Khaloua	Stadium: Stade Village Ziaten

30 January 2021 9	IR Tanger (Morocco)	3–2	(Morocco) RCA Zemamra	Tangier, Morocco
14:00 UTC+1	Méyé; Ijroten 40', 62'		Goal	Stadium: Stade Village Ziaten

6 February 2021 10	IR Tanger (Morocco)	2–1	(Morocco) MA Tétouan	Tangier, Morocco
15:00 UTC+1	Méyé 20'; Mukoko 85'	Report	El Hassnaoui	Stadium: Stade Village Ziaten

18 February 2021 11	IR Tanger (Morocco)	4–0	(Morocco) R Moh Pako	Tangier, Morocco
--:-- UTC+1	Anouar; Jarfi; Saroukh; Aarab			Stadium: Stade Village Ziaten

10 March 2021 12	IR Tanger (Morocco)	1–0	(Morocco) C Assili	Tangier, Morocco
--:-- UTC+1				Stadium: Stade Village Ziaten

20 March 2021 13	Fath US (Morocco)	1–0	(Morocco) IR Tanger	Rabat, Morocco
15:00 UTC+1	Azoud 44'	Report		Stadium: Stade Moulay Hassan

24 March 2021 14	IR Tanger (Morocco)	2–1	(Morocco) AC Ksiri	Tangier, Morocco
15:30 UTC+1	Chentouf 8'; Akhrif 40'		Goal	Stadium: Stade Village Ziaten

27 March 2021 15	IR Tanger (Morocco)	2–1	(Morocco) S Marocain	Tangier, Morocco
15:00 UTC+1	Ijroten 5'; Akhrif 87'		Goal	Stadium: Stade Ibn Batouta

10 June 2021 16	IR Tanger (Morocco)	3–0	(Morocco) CA Tanger	Tangier, Morocco
--:-- UTC+1	Anouar; Regragui			Stadium: Stade Village Ziaten

19 June 2021 17	IR Tanger (Morocco)	6–0	(Morocco) WJ Tanger	Tangier, Morocco
--:-- UTC+1				Stadium: Stade Village Ziaten

== Competitions ==
Win Draw Loss

=== Overview ===
Competition	First match	Last match	Starting round	Final position	Record							
Competition	First match	Last match	Starting round	Final position	Pld	W	D	L	GF	GA	GD	Win %
Botola	6 December 2020	27 July 2021	Matchday 1	8th	30	10	6	14	29	35	−6	33.33
Throne Cup	2 January 2021	3 March 2021	Round of 32	Round of 16	2	1	1	0	4	1	+3	50.00
Total					32	11	7	14	33	36	−3	34.38

Last updated: 27 July 2021.
Source: Competitions

=== Botola ===
==== Standings ====
Pos	Team	Pld	W	D	L	GF	GA	GD	Pts
6	Hassania Agadir	30	9	10	11	23	24	−1	37
7	Maghreb de Fès	30	7	15	8	30	34	−4	36 (Note: Head-to-head: Maghreb de Fès: 4 points, IR Tanger: 1 point.)
8	IR Tanger	30	10	6	14	29	36	−7	36
9	FUS Rabat	30	8	11	11	32	36	−4	35 (Note: Head-to-head: FUS Rabat: 11 points, Chabab Mohammédia: 9 point, Olympic Safi: 7 point, Difaâ El Jadidi: 5 point.)
10	Chabab Mohammédia	30	7	14	9	26	25	+1	35

Source: FRMF.ma
Rules for classification: 1) Points; 2a) Head-to-head goal difference if they are two teams with equal points; 2b) Goal difference if they are more than two teams with equal points; 3) Number of wins; 4) Goals scored; 5) Play-off between involved teams.

==== Results summary ====
Overall								Home						Away					
Pld	W	D	L	GF	GA	GD	Pts	W	D	L	GF	GA	GD	W	D	L	GF	GA	GD
29	10	6	13	29	35	−6	36	4	3	8	13	18	−5	6	3	5	16	17	−1

Last updated: 24 July 2020.
Source: goalzz.com

==== Results by round ====
Round	1	2	3	4	5	6	7	8	9	10	11	12	13	14	15	16	17	18	19	20	21	22	23	24	25	26	27	28	29	30
Ground	A	H	A	H	A	H	A	H	A	H	A	A	H	A	H	H	A	H	A	H	A	H	A	H	A	H	H	A	H	A
Result	W	W	W	D	L	L	L	L	W	L	W	D	W	L	W	D	D	L	L	W	W	L	D	L	L	L	L	W	D	L
Position	6	3	1	2	4	4	7	10	5	8	6	7	5	5	5	4	5	5	7	4	4	4	4	5	7	9	10	8	7	8

Updated to match(es) played on 27 July 2021. Source: Botola
A = Away; H = Home; W = Win; D = Draw; L = Loss

==== Matches ====
6 December 2020 1	HUS Agadir	0–1	IR Tanger	Agadir
15:30 UTC+1	Morsli (yellow card) 31'; Lirki (yellow card) 40'; Rami (red card) 76'; Bouftini (yellow card) 79'; Marzougi (yellow card) 90'; El Khanboubi (red card) 90+2'	Report	Anouar 28'; El Asbahi (yellow card) 34'; Jayed (yellow card) 72'; Méyé (yellow card) 78'	Stadium: Stade Adrar; Attendance: 0 Referee: Mohamed Bellote

9 December 2020 2	IR Tanger	1–0	OC Safi	Tangier
19:30 UTC+1	Astati (yellow card) 21'; Ijroten (yellow card) 28' (goal) 39'; Konaté (yellow card) 81'; Bemammar (yellow card) 90'	Report	Sabbar (yellow card) 66'; Michte (yellow card) 84'	Stadium: Stade Ibn Batouta; Attendance: 0 Referee: Hamza El Fareq

13 December 2020 3	Fath US	0–1	IR Tanger	Rabat
19:30 UTC+1	El Bassil (yellow card) 61'; Louani (yellow card) 70'	Report	Astati 29' (pen.); Ijroten (yellow card) 69'; Konaté (yellow card) 80'	Stadium: Stade Moulay Hassan; Attendance: 0 Referee: Hicham Tamssamani

20 December 2020 4	IR Tanger	1–1	MA Tétouan	Tangier
19:30 UTC+1	Méyé 6' (pen.); El Asbahi (yellow card) 31' (yellow-red card) 45'	Report	Bemammar 26' (o.g.); El Moussaoui (yellow card) 45'; El Achir (yellow card) 77'	Stadium: Stade Ibn Batouta; Attendance: 0 Referee: Karim Sabry

27 December 2020 5	RCA Zemamra	4–1	IR Tanger	Mohammédia
15:30 UTC+1	Atchabao 34', 47'; El Barki (yellow card) 37'; El Mejhed 45' (o.g.); Zannane (yellow card) 45+6'; Hamdan (yellow card) 85'; Rhabra 90+7'; Khafi (yellow card) 90+8'	Report	Ijroten 16'; Jayed (yellow card) 52'; Khallati (red card) 90+3'	Stadium: Stade El Bachir; Attendance: 0 Referee: Mohamed Nhayeh

13 February 2021 6	IR Tanger	0–1	RC Oued Zem	Tangier
17:15 UTC+1	Khallati (yellow card) 22'; Astati (yellow card) 38'	Report	El Bahri 24'; Ouaya (yellow card) 90+5'	Stadium: Stade Ibn Batouta; Attendance: 0 Referee: Mohamed Bellote

25 February 2021 7	Raja CA	2–0	IR Tanger	Casablanca
19:30 UTC+1	Hadhoudi (yellow card) 8'; Sadaoui 42'; Malango 90+2'	Report	Bemammer (yellow card) 69'; Jayed (yellow card) 72'	Stadium: Stade Mohamed V Attendance: 0 Referee: Abderahim Yaacoubi

28 February 2021 8	IR Tanger	1–2	MC Oujda	Tangier
17:15 UTC+1	Méyé 40' (pen.); Bemammer (yellow card) 77'	Report	Diakite 18'; Konaté 29' (o.g.); Khafi (yellow card) 38'	Stadium: Stade Ibn Batouta; Attendance: 0 Referee: Karim Sabry

14 March 2021 9	SCC Mohammédia	1–2	IR Tanger	Mohammédia
17:15 UTC+1	Lamlioui 5'	Report	Jarfi 66'; Bemammer (yellow card) 72'; Jayed (yellow card) 80'; Méyé 90+1'	Stadium: Stade El Bachir; Attendance: 0 Referee: Redouane Jiyed

3 April 2021 10	IR Tanger	1–2	AS FAR	Tangier
17:15 UTC+1	Méyé (penalty missed); Anouar 83'	Report	Toungara 31'; Slim 40'; Daoudi (yellow card) 82'	Stadium: Stade Ibn Batouta; Attendance: 0 Referee: Hicham Temsamani

7 April 2021 11	RS Berkane	1–2	IR Tanger	Berkane
15:00 UTC+1	Regragui (yellow card) 8'; El Bahraoui 26'; Naiym (yellow card) 42'; El Helali (yellow card) 90+5'	Report	Ijroten 30'; Chibi (yellow card) 34'; Jarfi (yellow card) 41'; Akhrif 80'; Méyé (yellow card) 90+4'	Stadium: Stade Municipal de Berkane; Attendance: 0 Referee: Jalal Jiyed

18 April 2021 12	DH Jadidi	0–0	IR Tanger	El Jadida
22:00 UTC	El Jaaouani (yellow card) 39'; Karnass (yellow card) 90'	Report	Sadil (yellow card) 48' (yellow-red card) 53'	Stadium: Stade El Abdi; Attendance: 0 Referee: Samir Guezzaz

25 April 2021 13	IR Tanger	3–2	Wydad AC	Tangier
22:00 UTC	Mukoko (yellow card) 68'; Anouar 72' (pen.); Méyé 77' (pen.); Khallati (yellow card) 79'; Chibi 90+4' (yellow card) 90+4'	Report	El Amloud 8'; Msuva 38'; El Moudane (yellow card) 90+6'	Stadium: Stade Ibn Batouta; Attendance: 0 Referee: Abdelaziz Lamssalek

1 May 2021 14	Maghreb AS	2–1	IR Tanger	Fez
22:00 UTC	El Fakih 81' (pen.); Gourbi 87'	Report	Jarfi (yellow card) 62'; Méyé (penalty missed) 73'	Stadium: Stade Hassan-II; Attendance: 0 Referee: Nouredine Jaafari

7 May 2021 15	IR Tanger	2–0	CAY Berrechid	Tangier
22:00 UTC	Méyé 2', 62'; Konaté (yellow card) 21'; Jayed (yellow card) 60'; Anouar (yellow card) 72'; Khallati (yellow card) 78'; El Mejhed (yellow card) 78'	Report		Stadium: Stade Ibn Batouta; Attendance: 0 Referee: Hamza El Fareq

11 May 2021 16	IR Tanger	1–1	HUS Agadir	Tangier
22:00 UTC	Astati (yellow card) 68'; Jayed (yellow card) 78'; Méyé 83' (pen.)	Report	Abouzhar (yellow card) 36'; Sadiki (yellow card) 82'; El Khanboubi 93' (yellow card) 94'	Stadium: Stade Ibn Batouta; Attendance: 0 Referee: Mohamed Benrekiya

15 May 2021 17	OC Safi	1–1	IR Tanger	Safi
17:00 UTC+1	Khabba 50'; Sabbar (yellow card) 77'	Report	Khallati (yellow card) 60'; Méyé 90+3'	Stadium: Stade El Massira; Attendance: 0 Referee: Jallal Jayed

20 May 2021 18	IR Tanger	1–2	Fath US	Tangier
17:00 UTC+1	Méyé 66'; El Asbahi (yellow card) 84'	Report	Maouhoub (yellow card) 23' (goal) 58'; Zerhouni 75' (yellow card) 80'; Benabid (yellow card) 87'	Stadium: Stade Ibn Batouta; Attendance: 0 Referee: Karim Sabry

23 May 2021 19	MA Tétouan	1–0	IR Tanger	Rabat
21:30 UTC+1	Lamrabat (yellow card) 86' (yellow-red card) 95'; El Hassnaoui (yellow card) 90'; Gueye 90+4'	Report	Jarfi (yellow card) 34'; El Asbahi (yellow card) 53'; Chibi (yellow card) 86'	Stadium: Prince Moulay Abdellah Stadium; Attendance: 0 Referee: Daki Reddad

26 May 2021 20	IR Tanger	2–0	RCA Zemamra	Tangier
19:15 UTC+1	Méyé (yellow card) 38'; Bemammer (yellow card) 38'; Ijroten 47'; Sadil (yellow card) 77'; El Mrabet (red card) 81' (coach); Akhrif 82'	Report	El Moutataouia (yellow card) 27' (yellow-red card) 31'; Hamdan (yellow card) 65'	Stadium: Stade Ibn Batouta; Attendance: 0 Referee: Mostafa Kechaf

29 May 2021 21	RC Oued Zem	1–2	IR Tanger	Khouribga
21:30 UTC+1	Rouhi (yellow card) 24'; Talib Rabbih 35'	Report	Ijroten 19'; Astati (yellow card) 68' (goal) 90+6'	Stadium: Complexe OCP; Attendance: 0 Referee: Moncef Zine Alaoui

16 June 2021 22	IR Tanger	0–3	Raja CA	Tangier
21:30 UTC+1	Bemammer (yellow card) 40'; Méyé (yellow card) 54'; Jarfi (yellow card) 70'; Chibi (yellow card) 77'	Report	Malango 17', 56'; Madkour (yellow card) 32'; Rahimi 39'; Hadhoudi (yellow card) 54'	Stadium: Stade Ibn Batouta; Attendance: 0 Referee: Nabil Benrkiya

26 June 2021 23	MC Oujda	0–0	IR Tanger	Oujda
19:15 UTC+1	Harkass (yellow card) 16'; Khafi (yellow card) 48'	Report		Stadium: Honneur Stadium; Attendance: 0 Referee: Slimane El Atifi

1 July 2021 24	IR Tanger	0–1	SCC Mohammédia	Tangier
19:15 UTC+1		Report	Assal (yellow card) 53'; Lamlioui 74'	Stadium: Stade Ibn Batouta; Attendance: 0 Referee: Adil Zourak

4 July 2021 25	AS FAR	2–1	IR Tanger	Kenitra
17:00 UTC+1	Jerrari 29'; Moujahid (yellow card) 66'; Dahmoun 90+4' (yellow card) 90+5'	Report	Ijroten 27' (yellow card) 72'; Abdel Mutalib (yellow card) 39'	Stadium: Stade Municipal; Attendance: 0 Referee: Hamza El Fariq

8 July 2021 26	IR Tanger	0–2	RS Berkane	Tangier
21:30 UTC+1	Astati (yellow card) 10'; Bemammer (yellow card) 13' (yellow-red card) 30'; Chibi (yellow card) 21'; Khallati (yellow card) 27'; Akhrif (yellow card) 30'; El Mrabet (red card) (coach); Konaté (yellow card) 73'	Report	Dayo 13'; Hadraf 74'	Stadium: Stade Ibn Batouta; Attendance: 0 Referee: Nouredine Jaafari

14 July 2021 27	IR Tanger	0–1	DH Jadidi	Tangier
19:15 UTC+1	El Asbahi (yellow card) 45'; Chentouf (yellow card) 90+1'; Ijroten (yellow card) 90+4'; El Ouahabi (yellow card) 90+6'	Report	Juma 36' (yellow card) 45'; Boukhriss (yellow card) 70'; Karnass (yellow card) 90+2'; El Ghafouli (red card) 90+9'	Stadium: Stade Ibn Batouta; Attendance: 0 Referee: Redouane Jiyed

18 July 2021 28	Wydad AC	2–4	IR Tanger	Casablanca
17:00 UTC+1	Aouk (red card) 44'; El Kaabi 63'; Chrachem (yellow card) 78'; El Ouardi 90+2'; Ait Allal (yellow card) 90+6'	Report	Méyé 15' (pen.), 16' (penalty missed); El Asbahi (yellow card) 34' (yellow-red card) 59'; Khallati (yellow card) 39'; Chentouf (yellow card) 45'; Jayed (yellow card) 80'; Anouar 85'; Al Aiz (yellow card) 88'; Aouattah (yellow card) 90+5'; Chibi (yellow card) 90+6'; Mukoko 90+6' (yellow card) 90+7'	Stadium: Stade Mohamed V Attendance: 0 Referee: Daki Reddad

24 July 2021 29	IR Tanger	0–0	Maghreb AS	Tangier
21:30 UTC+1	Mukoko (red card) 12'; Al Aiz (yellow card) 21'; Chibi (yellow card) 30'; Jayed (yellow card) 83'	Report	El Fakih (yellow card) 34'; El Janati (yellow card) 48'; Aguerdoum (yellow card) 62'; Lakhal (yellow card) 76'; Yechou (red card) 90+2'	Stadium: Stade Ibn Batouta; Attendance: 0 Referee: Mustapha Kechaf

27 July 2021 30	CAY Berrechid	1–0	IR Tanger	Berrechid
19:30 UTC+1	Hsaini (yellow card) 12'; Chaina (yellow card) 39' (yellow-red card) 49'; Haffari 48'; Niani (yellow card) 60'; Boujad (red card) 90'; El Idrissi (yellow card) 90+2'	Report		Stadium: Stade Municipal; Attendance: 0 Referee: Redouane Jiyed

==== Results overview ====
Locations of the 2020–21 Botola teams

Win Draw Loss

Region	Team	Home score	Away score	Aggregate
Casablanca-Settat	CAY Berrechid	2–0	1–0	2–1
Casablanca-Settat	DH Jadida	0–1	0–0	0–1
Casablanca-Settat	Raja CA	0–3	2–0	0–5
Casablanca-Settat	RCA Zemamra	2–0	4–1	3–4
Casablanca-Settat	SCC Mohammédia	0–1	1–2	2–2
Casablanca-Settat	Wydad AC	3–2	2–4	7–4
Oriental	MC Oujda	1–2	0–0	1–2
Oriental	RS Berkane	0–2	1–2	2–3
Rabat-Salé-Kénitra	AS FAR	1–2	2–1	2–4
Rabat-Salé-Kénitra	Fath US	1–2	0–1	2–2
Tanger-Tetouan-Al Hoceima	MA Tétouan	1–1	1–0	1–2
Fès-Meknès	MAS Fez	0–0	2–1	1–2
Béni Mellal-Khénifra	RC Oued Zem	0–1	1–2	2–2
Marrakech-Safi	OC Safi	1–0	1–1	2–1
Souss-Massa	HUS Agadir	1–1	0–1	2–1

=== Throne Cup ===
2 January 2021 Round of 32	IR Tanger	3–0	MC Oujda	Tangier
17:00 UTC+1	Méyé 33' (pen.); Chentouf (yellow card) 37'; Ijroten (yellow card) 45+1'; Chibi (yellow card) 50' (goal) 56'; Jayed (yellow card) 83'; Faouzi 90+4'; Akhrif (yellow card) 90+4'	Report	Khafifi (red card) 29'; Sanhaji (yellow card) 39'; Bahrou (yellow card) 75'	Stadium: Stade Ibn Batouta; Attendance: 0 Referee: Redouane Jiyed

3 March 2021 Round of 16	IR Tanger	1–1 (a.e.t.) (1–3 p)	AS FAR	Tangier
19:30 UTC+1	Bemammer (yellow card) 27'; Ijroten 39'	Report	Slim 20'; Daoudi (yellow card) 111'	Stadium: Stade Ibn Batouta; Attendance: 0 Referee: Noureddine Jaafari
	Penalties
	Bemammer (penalty missed); Astati (penalty scored); El Ouahabi (penalty missed); Méyé (penalty missed)		Dahmoun (penalty scored); Diney (penalty scored); Hrimat (penalty scored)

== Statistics ==
=== Squad appearances and goals ===
Last updated on 27 July 2021.

No.	Pos	Nat	Player	Total		Botola		Throne Cup	
No.	Pos	Nat	Player	Apps	Goals	Apps	Goals	Apps	Goals
Goalkeepers
33	GK	(Morocco) MAR	Imad Askar	2	-1	2	(-1)	0	(0)
55	GK	(Morocco) MAR	Tarik Aouattah	10	-13	9+1	(-13)	0	(0)
65	GK	(Morocco) MAR	Hicham El Mejhed	21	-23	19	(-22)	2	(-1)
Defenders
3	DF	(Morocco) MAR	Hatim El Ouahabi	17	0	13+2	0	2	0
4	DF	(Morocco) MAR	Hakim Aklidou	7	0	2+4	0	1	0
13	DF	(Morocco) MAR	Oussama Al Aiz	7	0	6+1	0	0	0
15	DF	(Morocco) MAR	Ayoub Jarfi	17	1	12+3	1	1+1	0
20	DF	(Morocco) MAR	Mohamed Aymen Sadil	15	0	13+2	0	0	0
26	DF	(Gabon) GAB	Stévy Nzambé	0	0	0	0	0	0
29	DF	(Senegal) SEN	El Hadji Youssoupha Konaté	28	0	26	0	2	0
40	DF	(Morocco) MAR	Mehdi Khallati	18	0	17+1	0	0	0
70	DF	(Morocco) MAR	Tarik Astati	27	2	23+2	2	2	0
93	DF	(Morocco) MAR	Mohamed Chibi	29	2	27	1	2	1
Midfielders
2	MF	(Morocco) MAR	Anas El Asbahi	18	0	12+6	0	0	0
5	MF	(Morocco) MAR	Mohammed Ali Bemammer	25	0	23	0	2	0
6	MF	(Morocco) MAR	Nouaman Aarab	19	0	10+8	0	1	0
8	MF	(Morocco) MAR	Faouzi Abdel Mutalib	13	1	3+9	0	0+1	1
10	MF	(Morocco) MAR	Kahled Saroukh	17	0	6+10	0	1	0
16	MF	(Morocco) MAR	Ahmed Chentouf	25	0	14+9	0	1+1	0
19	MF	(Morocco) MAR	Marouane Nebouch	4	0	2+2	0	0	0
25	MF	(Morocco) MAR	Anouar Jayed	21	0	13+6	0	1+1	0
66	MF	(Morocco) MAR	Yassine Asri	1	0	1	0	0	0
Forwards
7	FW	(Morocco) MAR	Youssef Anouar	27	4	17+9	4	0+1	0
11	FW	(Gabon) GAB	Axel Méyé	30	13	26+2	12	1+1	1
14	FW	(Morocco) MAR	Ibrahim Bezghoudi	4	0	0+4	0	0	0
23	FW	(Morocco) MAR	Abdellatif Akhrif	20	2	2+17	2	0+1	0
36	FW	(Morocco) MAR	Nassim Regragui	1	0	0+1	0	-	-
61	FW	(Morocco) MAR	Badreddine Moudin	1	0	0+1	0	-	-
76	FW	(Morocco) MAR	Taoufik Ijroten	30	7	24+4	6	2	1
77	FW	(Democratic Republic of the Congo) COD	Mukoko Batezadio	23	1	8+13	1	1+1	0
Players who have made an appearance or had a squad number this season but have left the club
17	FW	(Morocco) MAR	Younes Ed-dyb	4	0	0+3	0	0+1	0

=== Goalscorers ===
Rank	No.	Pos	Nat	Name	Botola	Throne Cup	Total
1	11	FW	(Gabon)	Axel Méyé	12	1	13
2	76	FW	(Morocco)	Taoufik Ijroten	6	1	7
3	7	FW	(Morocco)	Youssef Anouar	4	0	4
4	93	DF	(Morocco)	Mohamed Chibi	1	1	2
4	23	FW	(Morocco)	Abdellatif Akhrif	2	0	2
4	70	DF	(Morocco)	Tarik Astati	2	0	2
7	15	DF	(Morocco)	Ayoub Jarfi	1	0	1
7	77	FW	(Democratic Republic of the Congo)	Mukoko Batezadio	1	0	1
7	8	MF	(Morocco)	Faouzi Abdel Mutalib	0	1	1
TOTAL					29	4	33

=== Assists ===
Rank	No.	Pos	Nat	Name	Botola	Throne Cup	Total
1	93	DF	(Morocco)	Mohamed Chibi	6	1	7
2	11	FW	(Gabon)	Axel Méyé	2	0	2
3	25	MF	(Morocco)	Anouar Jayed	1	0	1
3	8	MF	(Morocco)	Faouzi Abdel Mutalib	1	0	1
3	40	DF	(Morocco)	Mehdi Khallati	1	0	1
3	16	MF	(Morocco)	Ahmed Chentouf	1	0	1
3	7	FW	(Morocco)	Youssef Anouar	1	0	1
3	13	DF	(Morocco)	Oussama Al Aiz	1	0	1
3	3	DF	(Morocco)	Hatim El Ouahabi	1	0	1
3	23	FW	(Morocco)	Abdellatif Akhrif	0	1	1
TOTAL					15	2	17

=== Hat-tricks ===
Player	Against	Result	Date	Competition

(H) – Home; (A) – Away

=== Clean sheets ===
Last updated on 27 July 2021.

No	Name	Botola	Coupe du Trône	Total
33	(Morocco) Askar	1/2	0/0	1/2
55	(Morocco) Aouattah	2/10	0/0	2/10
65	(Morocco) El Mejhed	6/19	1/2	7/21
Total		8/30	1/2	9/32

=== Disciplinary record ===
N	P	Nat.	Name	Botola			Coupe du Trône			Total			Notes
N	P	Nat.	Name	Yellow card	Second yellow card	Red card	Yellow card	Second yellow card	Red card	Yellow card	Second yellow card	Red card	Notes
2	MF	(Morocco)	Anas El Asbahi	4	2					4	2		
3	DF	(Morocco)	Hatim El Ouahabi	1						1			
5	MF	(Morocco)	Mohammed Ali Bemammer	6	1		1			7	1		Ban sustained - 3 games one of them to stay of execution; Banned on 18 July 2021 - Returned on 26 July 2021
7	FW	(Morocco)	Youssef Anouar	1						1			
8	MF	(Morocco)	Faouzi Abdel Mutalib	1						1			
11	FW	(Gabon)	Axel Méyé	4						4			
13	DF	(Morocco)	Oussama Al Aiz	2						2			
15	DF	(Morocco)	Ayoub Jarfi	4						4			
16	MF	(Morocco)	Ahmed Chentouf	2			1			3			
20	DF	(Morocco)	Mohamed Aymen Sadil	1	1					1	1		
23	FW	(Morocco)	Abdellatif Akhrif	1			1			2			
25	MF	(Morocco)	Anouar Jayed	8			1			9			
29	DF	(Senegal)	El Hadji Youssoupha Konaté	4						4			
40	DF	(Morocco)	Mehdi Khallati	6		1				6		1	
55	GK	(Morocco)	Tarik Aouattah	1						1			
65	GK	(Morocco)	Hicham El Mejhed	1						1			
70	DF	(Morocco)	Tarik Astati	5						5			Banned - 8 games accused of insulting the player Issoufou Dayo; Banned on 18 July 2021
76	FW	(Morocco)	Taoufik Ijroten	4			1			5			
77	FW	(Democratic Republic of the Congo)	Mukoko Batezadio	2		1				2		1	
93	DF	(Morocco)	Mohamed Chibi	7			1			8			
		(Morocco)	Driss El Mrabet			2						2	Banned - 4 games; Banned on 18 July 2021

Last updated: 24 July 2021
Source: kooora.com
Only competitive matches
(yellow card) = Number of bookings; (second yellow card) = Number of sending offs after a second yellow card; (red card) = Number of sending offs by a direct red card.

=== Injury record ===
N	P	Nat.	Name	Type	Status	Source	Match	Inj. Date	Ret. Date
6	MF	(Morocco)	Nouaman Aarab	Knee injury			vs HUS Agadir	21 November 2020	7 December 2020
14	FW	(Morocco)	Ibrahim Bezghoudi	Knee injury			vs Adrar UAS	22 November 2020	18 April 2021
7	FW	(Morocco)	Youssef Anouar	Ankle injury			vs HUS Agadir	6 December 2020	27 December 2020
2	MF	(Morocco)	Anas El Asbahi				vs HUS Agadir	6 December 2020	20 December 2020
25	MF	(Morocco)	Anouar Jayed	Broken nose			vs Fath US	13 December 2020	27 December 2020
2	MF	(Morocco)	Anas El Asbahi	Knee injury			in training	January 2021	21 February 2021
4	DF	(Morocco)	Hakim Aklidou				vs MA Tétouan	27 January 2021	9 March 2021
40	DF	(Morocco)	Mehdi Khallati	Left leg muscle injury			vs AS FAR in warm-up	3 March 2021	30 March 2021
3	DF	(Morocco)	Hatim El Ouahabi	Ankle ligaments injury			in training	4–6 April 2021	8 July 2021
8	MF	(Morocco)	Faouzi Abdel Mutalib	Ankle sprain			vs RS Berkane	7 April 2021	11 May 2021
4	DF	(Morocco)	Hakim Aklidou				in training	8–17 April 2021	16 June 2021
10	MF	(Morocco)	Kahled Saroukh	Fissure in the rib cage			vs Wydad AC	25 April 2021	1 May 2021
2	MF	(Morocco)	Anas El Asbahi	Minor ankle injury			vs Wydad AC	25 April 2021	2 May 2021
10	MF	(Morocco)	Kahled Saroukh	Right knee cartilage injury			in training	2–6 May 2021	16 June 2021
5	MF	(Morocco)	Mohammed Ali Bemammer	Stretch in the connective muscle of the thigh			vs HUS Agadir	11 May 2021	23 May 2021
25	MF	(Morocco)	Anouar Jayed				vs Fath US	20 May 2021	16 June 2021
65	GK	(Morocco)	Hicham El Majhad	Ligament stretch of the shoulder muscle			vs MA Tétouan	23 May 2021	Unknown

- Player is injured
- Player has recovered from injury
Last updated: 18 July 2021
Source: clubirt kooora.com

== See also ==
- 2015–16 IR Tanger season
- 2016–17 IR Tanger season
- 2017–18 IR Tanger season
- 2018–19 IR Tanger season
- 2019–20 IR Tanger season
