= 2022–23 Botola Pro =

Moroccan football league season

Botola Inwi
- Season: 2022–23
- Dates: 1 September 2022 – 23 June 2023
- Champions: AS FAR; 13th title
- Relegated: OC Khouribga; DH Jadidi
- Champions League: AS FAR; Wydad AC
- Confederation Cup: FUS Rabat; RS Berkane
- Matches: 240
- Goals: 512 (2.13 per match)
- Top goalscorer: Bouly Sambou (13 goals)
- Biggest home win: Fath US 5-0 DH Jadidi (19 avril 2023)
- Biggest away win: JS Soualem 1-4 Raja CA (5 November 2022); MA Tetouan 0-3 Wydad AC (8 January 2023); SCC Mohammédia 0-3 JS Soualem (8 January 2023); RS Berkane 1-4 AS FAR (22 February 2023); JS Soualem 0-3 OC Safi (23 June 2023)
- Highest scoring: OC Khouribga 6-4 Union de Touarga (23 June 2022)
- Longest winning run: AS FAR (5 matches)
- Longest unbeaten run: Wydad AC (20 matches)
- Longest winless run: DH Jadidi (17 matches)
- Longest losing run: IR Tanger (8 matches)
- All statistics correct as of 23 June 2023.

The 2022–23 Botola Pro, also known as Botola Pro Inwi for sponsorship reasons, was the 66th season of the Premier League and the 12th under its current format of Moroccan Pro League, the top Moroccan professional league for association football clubs, since its establishment in 1956.

Wydad Casablanca came into the season as defending champions of the 2021–22 season. Moghreb Tétouan and Union de Touarga entered as the two promoted teams from the 2021–22 Botola 2.

On June 23, 2023, AS FAR won the Botola Pro after a 2–3 victory against Ittihad Tanger in the last round. The AS FAR club won its 13th title after fifteen years since the last time in 2007–08.

== Teams ==
=== Stadium and locations ===
Locations of the 2022–23 Botola teams

Team name	Acronym	Location	Stadium	Capacity
AS FAR	ASFAR	Rabat	Prince Moulay Abdellah Stadium	53,000
Chabab Mohammédia	SCCM	Mohammédia	Stade El Bachir	15,000
Difaâ El Jadidi	DHJ	El Jadida	Stade El Abdi	10,000
Fath Union Sport	FUS	Rabat	Stade Moulay Hassan	12,000
Hassania Agadir	HUSA	Agadir	Stade Adrar	45,480
IR Tanger	IRT	Tanger	Stade Ibn Batouta	65,000
JS Soualem	JSS	Soualem	Stade Municipal de Berrechid	5,000
Maghreb de Fès	MAS	Fez	Fez Stadium	45,000
Moghreb Tétouan	MAT	Tétouan	Saniat Rmel	10,000
Mouloudia Oujda	MCO	Oujda	Honneur Stadium	30,000
Nahdat Berkane	RSB	Berkane	Stade Municipal de Berkane	15,000
Olympique Khouribga	OCK	Khouribga	Complexe OCP	10,000
Olympic Safi	OCS	Safi	Stade El Massira	15,000
Raja CA	RCA	Casablanca	Stade Mohamed V	67,000
Union de Touarga	UTS	Rabat	Stade Moulay Hassan	12,000
Wydad AC	WAC	Casablanca	Stade Mohamed V	67,000

=== Personnel and kits ===
Teams	Managers	Captain	Kit manufacturer	Shirt sponsor
AS FAR	(Morocco) Mohamed Samadi	(Morocco) Mohamed Rabie Hrimat	Erreà	
DH Jadida	(Morocco) Abderrahim Talib	(Morocco) Moustapha Chichane	Jako	TGCC, Ilham Plastique, Mazagan, Alitkane^{1}
Fath US	(Morocco) Jamal Sellami	(Morocco) El Mehdi El Bassil	Uhlsport	Novec, LafargeHolcim Maroc^{1}
HUS Agadir	(Morocco) Abdelhadi Sektioui	(Morocco) Youssef Mehri	Bang Sports	Afriquia, Skoda^{1}, Souss-Massa^{2}
IR Tanger	(Morocco) Hilal Et-tair	(Morocco) Mohsine Moutouali	Gloria Sport	Tanger-Med
JS Soualem	(Morocco) Bouchaib El Moubarki	(Morocco) Amine El Msane	Mexxess	Crunchips, Asta, Tobigo^{1}, Alitkane^{3}
Maghreb AS	(Morocco) Omar Hassi	(Morocco) Mohammed Ali Bemammer	Mexxess	TGCC, Asta^{1}
MA Tétouan	(Morocco) Hicham Louissi	(Morocco) Adil El Hassnaoui	AB Sport	Tanger-Med, Municipality of Tetouan^{2}, Cafés Carrion^{2}
MC Oujda	(Morocco) Omar Najhi	(Morocco) Yassir Jarici	Macron	Dari^{1}
OC Khouribga	(Morocco) Mohamed Fakhir	(Morocco) Youssef Oggadi	Kelme / Bang Sports	
OC Safi	(Egypt) Tarek Mostafa	(Morocco) Mohamed El Mourabit	Bang Sports	Fitco, Maroc Force Emploi, ocstore.ma^{1}
Raja CA	(Morocco) Hicham Aboucherouane (interim)	(Morocco) Anas Zniti	One All Sports	1xBet, OLA Energy, Sofac^{3}, Nor'Dar, MarsaMaroc^{1}, Atlanta Sanad^{2}^{3}
RS Berkane	(Morocco) Amine El Karma	(Burkina Faso) Issoufou Dayo	Bang Sports	Thé Dahmiss, GoldVision^{1}, National Gaz^{1}
SCC Mohammédia	(Morocco) Rachid Rokki	(Morocco) Abdelhak Assal	Chabab	Vittel^{2}
US Touarga	(Morocco) Tarik Sektioui	(Morocco) Achraf Harmach	Macron	
Wydad AC	(Belgium) Sven Vandenbroeck	(Morocco) Yahya Jabrane	Macron	Ingelec, Boule d'Or^{1}, Sama Immobilier^{1}, Alitkane^{2}

1. On the back of shirt.
2. On the sleeves.
3. On the shorts.
Additionally, referee kits are made by Puma.

=== Managerial changes ===
Teams	Outgoing manager	Manner of departure	Date of vacancy	Incoming manager	Date of appointment
Chabab Mohammédia	(Morocco) Mohamed Fakhir	End of contract	5 July 2022	(Morocco) Rachid Rokki	30 July 2022
Difaâ El Jadidi	(Algeria) Abdelhak Benchikha	End of contract	5 July 2022	(Tunisia) Lassaad Chabbi	18 July 2022
Raja CA	(Morocco) Bouchaib El Moubarki (interim)	End of tenure as caretake	6 July 2022	(Tunisia) Faouzi Benzarti	6 July 2022
IR Tanger	(Spain) Juan Pedro Benali	End of contract	12 July 2022	(Morocco) Ezzaki Badou	15 July 2022
AS FAR	(Belgium) Sven Vandenbroeck	Contract termination	16 July 2022	(France) Fernando Da Cruz	12 August 2022
US Touarga	(Morocco) Said Rizgui	End of contract	28 July 2022	(Morocco) Tarik Sektioui	28 July 2022
Hassania Agadir	(Morocco) Abdelhadi Sektioui	Sacked	28 July 2022	(Brazil) Marcos Paquetá	28 July 2022
Wydad Casablanca	(Morocco) Walid Regragui	End of contract	31 July 2022	(Morocco) Hussein Ammouta	18 August 2022
RS Berkane	(Democratic Republic of the Congo) Florent Ibengé	Contract termination	6 August 2022	(Algeria) Abdelhak Benchikha	9 August 2022
OC Khouribga	(Morocco) Abdessamad Ouarad	End of contract	6 August 2022	(Tunisia) Lassaad Dridi	6 August 2022
Raja CA	(Tunisia) Faouzi Benzarti	Mutual consent	21 September 2022	(Tunisia) Mondher Kebaier	24 September 2022
Maghreb AS	(Tunisia) Abdelhay Ben Soltane	Contract termination	10 October 2022	(Morocco) Abderrahim Chkilit	10 October 2022
IR Tanger	(Morocco) Ezzaki Badou	Mutual consent	18 October 2022	(Morocco) Hassan Fadil (interim)	18 October 2022
IR Tanger	(Morocco) Hassan Fadil (interim)	End of tenure as caretake	25 October 2022	(Morocco) Hakim Daoudi	25 October 2022
MC Oujda	(Morocco) Mounir Jaouani	Sacked	6 November 2022	(Morocco) Omar Najhi	8 November 2022
RS Berkane	(Algeria) Abdelhak Benchikha	Mutual consent	10 November 2022	(Morocco) Amine El Karma	11 November 2022
OC Khouribga	(Tunisia) Lassaad Dridi	Mutual consent	16 November 2022	(Portugal) Ricardo Formosinho	1 December 2022
Wydad AC	(Morocco) Hussein Ammouta	Contract termination	30 November 2022	(Morocco) Hassan Benabicha (interim)	1 December 2022
Moghreb Tétouan	(Morocco) Abdellatif Jrindou	Mutual consent	6 December 2022	(Morocco) Reda Hakam	6 December 2022
Wydad AC	(Morocco) Hassan Benabicha (interim)	End of tenure as caretake	2 January 2023	(Tunisia) Mehdi Nafti	2 January 2023
IR Tanger	(Morocco) Hakim Daoudi	Mutual consent	20 January 2023	(Morocco) Hilal Ettair	20 January 2023
Maghreb AS	(Morocco) Abderrahim Chkilit	Mutual consent	2 February 2023	(Morocco) Aziz Ben Askar	3 February 2023
Wydad AC	(Tunisia) Mehdi Nafti	Contract termination	26 February 2023	(Spain) Juan Carlos Garrido	26 February 2023
Moghreb Tétouan	(Morocco) Reda Hakam	Contract termination	26 February 2023	(Morocco) Jamaleddine Drideb (interim)	26 February 2023
Hassania Agadir	(Brazil) Marcos Paquetá	Mutual consent	7 March 2023	(Morocco) Abdelhadi Sektioui	9 March 2023
Moghreb Tétouan	(Morocco) Jamaleddine Drideb (interim)	End of tenure as caretake	14 March 2023	(Morocco) Hicham Louissi	14 March 2023
Difaâ El Jadidi	(Tunisia) Lassaad Chabbi	Mutual consent	8 April 2023	(Morocco) Abderrahim Talib	9 April 2023
JS Soualem	(Morocco) Zakaria Aboub	Resigned	9 April 2023	(Morocco) Bouchaib El Moubarki	9 April 2023
OC Khouribga	(Portugal) Ricardo Formosinho	Mutual consent	11 April 2023	(Morocco) Mohamed Fakhir	11 April 2023
Maghreb AS	(Morocco) Aziz Ben Askar	Mutual consent	22 April 2023	(Morocco) Omar Hassi	22 April 2023
Wydad AC	(Spain) Juan Carlos Garrido	Contract termination	5 May 2023	(Belgium) Sven Vandenbroeck	5 May 2023
AS FAR	(France) Fernando Da Cruz	Mutual consent	25 May 2023	(Morocco) Mohamed Samadi	26 May 2023
Raja CA	(Tunisia) Mondher Kebaier	Contract termination	7 June 2023	(Morocco) Hicham Aboucherouane (interim)	8 June 2023

=== Foreign players ===
All teams are allowed to register up to five foreign players, but can only use up to three players on the field at the same time.

Players name in bold indicates the player is registered during the mid-season transfer window.

Club	Player 1	Player 2	Player 3	Player 4	Player 5	Former Players
AS FAR	(Ivory Coast) Joseph Guédé Gnadou	(Ivory Coast) Lamine Diakité	(Cape Verde) Diney	(Rwanda) Emmanuel Imanishimwe	(Senegal) Bakary Mané	
Chabab Mohammédia	(Guinea) Tidiane Doumbouya	(Mali) Issouf Traoré				(Nigeria) Adeleke Oluwatobi Babatunde
Difaâ El Jadidi	(Ivory Coast) Hervé Zahi	(Cameroon) **Salomon Bindjeme II**	(Democratic Republic of the Congo) Christian Nsundi	(Democratic Republic of the Congo) Dieumerci Amale	(Libya) Taher Benamer	(Kenya) Masoud Juma
FUS Rabat	(Ivory Coast) Hervé Guy	(Ivory Coast) Oumar Farouk Comara	(Cameroon) Herman Junior Kameni			
Hassania Agadir	(Democratic Republic of the Congo) Junior Mbele	(Democratic Republic of the Congo) Katulondi Kati	(Tunisia) Fedi Ben Choug	(Tunisia) Houssem Eddine Souissi		
IR Tanger	(Algeria) Abdellah El Moudene	(Algeria) **Gaya Merbah**	(Ivory Coast) Djama Joé Amian	(Gabon) Abdou Atchabao	(Senegal) **El Hadji Youssoupha Konaté**	(Senegal) Ngagne Fall (Togo) Donou Hubert
JS Soualem	(The Gambia) Gibril Sillah	(Mali) Abdoulaye Traoré				
Maghreb de Fès	(Ivory Coast) Banfa Sylla	(Gabon) Louis Ameka Autchanga				(Algeria) Oussama Darfalou
Moghreb Tétouan						
Mouloudia Oujda	(Algeria) Abdelkader Kaibou	(Algeria) Ibrahim Farhi Benhalima	(Senegal) Paul Valère Bassène			(Algeria) Ali Haroun
Nahdat Berkane	(Burkina Faso) Djibril Ouattara	(Burkina Faso) Issoufou Dayo	(Democratic Republic of the Congo) Chadrack Lukombe	(Mauritania) Adama Ba	(Niger) Victorien Adebayor	
OC Khouribga	(Algeria) Mohamed Walid Bencherifa	(Botswana) **Kabelo Seakanyeng**	(Ivory Coast) Treika Blé	(Ghana) **Kwame Opoku**	(Ghana) **Richmond Antwi**	(Botswana) Tumisang Orebonye (Senegal) Adama Diom (Tunisia) Nassim Hnid
Olympic Safi	(Gabon) **Axel Méyé**	(Guinea) Boniface Haba	(Mali) Abdoulaye Diarra	(Mali) Cheickne Samaké		
Raja CA	(Algeria) Abdelraouf Benguit	(Algeria) Yousri Bouzok	(Togo) Roger Aholou			(Algeria) Gaya Merbah (Gabon) Axel Méyé
Union de Touarga	(Chad) Eric Mbangossoum	(Cameroon) Jean-Joseph Kombous	(Portugal) Tiago Lopes	(Senegal) Simon Diedhiou		(Senegal) Mamadou Diagne
Wydad AC	(Algeria) Houcine Benayada	(Cameroon) **Didier Lamkel Zé**	(Democratic Republic of the Congo) Arsène Zola	(Libya) Muaid Ellafi	(Senegal) Bouly Sambou	(Republic of the Congo) Juvhel Tsoumou (Ivory Coast) Cheick Comara (Mali) Kartier Dembélé

== League table ==
Pos	Team	Pld	W	D	L	GF	GA	GD	Pts	Qualification or relegation
1	AS FAR (C)	30	20	7	3	50	19	+31	67	Qualification for Champions League
2	Wydad AC	30	19	9	2	47	21	+26	66	Qualification for Champions League
3	Fath Union Sport	30	15	10	5	36	16	+20	55	Qualification for Confederation Cup
4	Olympic Club de Safi	30	12	11	7	34	28	+6	47	
5	Raja CA	30	11	11	8	31	26	+5	44 (Note: Head-to-head: Raja CA: 6 points, RS Berkane: 0 point.)	
6	RS Berkane	30	11	11	8	31	29	+2	44	Qualification for Confederation Cup (Note: RS Berkane qualified for the CAF Confederation Cup by winning the 2021–22 Moroccan Throne Cup.)
7	Hassania Agadir	30	10	9	11	30	29	+1	39	
8	Union de Touarga	30	9	9	12	34	40	−6	36 (Note: Head-to-head: Union de Touarga: 4 points, Jeunesse Sportive Soualem: 1 point.)	
9	Jeunesse Sportive Soualem	30	9	9	12	31	40	−9	36	
10	Maghreb de Fès	30	7	13	10	27	33	−6	34	
11	MC Oujda	30	8	8	14	30	35	−5	32	
12	SCC Mohammédia	30	8	7	15	27	36	−9	31	
13	Moghreb Tétouan	30	6	12	12	28	41	−13	30	
14	Ittihad Tanger	30	8	5	17	23	39	−16	29	
15	Olympique Khouribga (R)	30	5	13	12	29	36	−7	28	Relegation to Botola 2
16	Difaâ El Jadidi (R)	30	5	10	15	24	44	−20	25	Relegation to Botola 2

Updated to match(es) played on 23 June 2023. Source: FRMF.ma
Rules for classification: 1) Points; 2a) Head-to-head goal difference if they are two teams with equal points; 2b) Goal difference if they are more than two teams with equal points; 3) Number of wins; 4) Goals scored; 5) Play-off between involved teams.
(C) Champions; (R) Relegated

== Results ==
Home \ Away	ASFAR	DHJ	FUS	HUSA	IRT	JSS	MAS	MAT	MCO	OCS	OCK	RCA	RSB	SCCM	UTS	WAC
AS FAR	—	4–1	0–1	2–1	4–0	2–1	2–1	2–1	3–2	1–1	1–0	0–0	1–1	1–0	3–0	3–0
DH Jadidi	0–1	—	0–3	2–2	2–1	0–0	2–2	0–0	0–1	0–1	2–1	0–0	0–0	1–0	1–0	0–1
Fath US	0–2	5–0	—	0–0	1–0	2–0	0–0	1–2	2–1	2–1	1–1	3–0	0–0	2–1	3–0	1–1
HUS Agadir	2–1	2–2	0–1	—	1–0	1–1	3–0	1–0	1–1	0–1	0–0	2–1	0–1	2–1	1–2	0–0
IR Tanger	2–3	1–0	1–0	0–2	—	0–1	2–3	2–0	0–2	2–1	3–0	0–0	2–1	0–1	0–1	0–0
JS Soualem	1–1	2–1	0–1	1–3	2–0	—	1–1	2–1	0–2	0–3	0–0	1–4	1–1	1–3	2–2	0–1
Maghreb AS	0–1	3–1	0–0	1–1	0–1	0–1	—	0–0	2–1	1–1	2–0	2–1	0–0	1–0	0–0	0–2
MA Tétouan	0–2	1–1	1–1	2–1	1–0	1–2	1–1	—	1–2	2–1	2–2	1–0	0–0	1–0	1–1	0–3
MC Oujda	0–1	1–2	0–0	2–0	0–0	3–4	2–1	2–1	—	0–1	0–0	0–0	1–2	0–0	2–2	0–1
OC Safi	0–0	0–0	0–1	1–1	1–0	1–1	2–1	1–1	1–2	—	1–0	3–1	1–1	0–0	3–2	0–0
OC Khouribga	0–2	1–1	2–3	2–0	1–1	1–0	2–2	3–0	1–1	0–1	—	0–0	1–1	0–1	6–4	1–2
Raja CA	1–0	3–2	1–0	1–0	3–0	0–0	0–0	1–1	2–1	2–2	0–1	—	2–1	1–0	2–1	2–2
RS Berkane	1–4	1–0	1–0	0–1	2–1	0–1	1–1	2–2	2–0	1–2	1–0	0–2	—	3–0	2–1	3–3
SCC Mohammédia	1–1	2–1	1–1	1–2	1–2	0–3	3–0	4–3	1–0	1–2	1–1	0–0	0–1	—	1–1	1–3
US Touarga	0–1	2–1	0–1	1–0	2–2	2–1	1–2	1–1	3–1	2–0	0–0	1–0	0–1	1–0	—	1–2
Wydad AC	1–1	3–1	0–0	1–0	3–0	3–1	1–0	2–0	1–0	3–1	3–2	2–1	2–0	1–2	0–0	—

Updated to match(es) played on 23 June 2023. Source: Goalzz
Legend: Blue = home team win; Yellow = draw; Red = away team win.
For upcoming matches, an "a" indicates there is an article about the rivalry between the two participants.

=== Positions by round ===
The table lists the positions of teams after each week of matches.

Team ╲ Round	1	2	3	4	5	6	7	8	9	10	11	12	13	14	15	16	17	18	19	20	21	22	23	24	25	26	27	28	29	30
ASFAR	3	4	4	2	2	2	2	1	1	1	1	1	1	1	1	1	1	1	1	1	1	1	1	1	1	1	1	1	1	1
Wydad AC	8	2	1	1	1	1	1	2	2	3	3	3	3	2	2	2	2	2	2	2	2	2	2	2	2	2	2	2	2	2
Fath Union Sport	9	5	8	8	5	3	5	4	4	2	2	2	2	4	3	3	3	3	3	3	3	3	3	3	3	3	3	3	3	3
Olympic Club de Safi	6	3	3	3	3	4	7	7	5	5	4	8	8	5	5	5	5	5	5	5	5	4	4	4	4	4	4	4	4	4
Raja CA	7	11	11	11	11	12	9	5	6	6	6	5	4	3	4	4	4	4	4	4	4	5	5	5	5	6	5	5	5	5
RS Berkane	16	13	12	15	15	14	13	13	12	12	10	11	10	9	6	6	6	6	6	6	7	8	6	7	6	5	6	6	6	6
Hassania Agadir	4	6	2	4	6	7	12	9	9	10	12	12	12	13	13	13	14	13	14	14	14	12	10	10	10	10	10	8	7	7
Union de Touarga	12	9	10	10	8	6	3	3	3	4	5	4	5	6	7	7	7	7	7	8	6	7	8	9	9	9	9	10	8	8
Jeunesse Soualem	1	8	5	6	4	5	4	8	8	9	8	7	7	8	8	8	8	8	8	9	9	6	7	6	7	8	7	7	9	9
Maghreb de Fès	11	12	14	13	12	11	8	6	7	7	7	6	6	7	9	9	9	9	9	7	8	9	9	8	8	7	8	9	10	10
Mouloudia Oujda	13	15	15	14	13	13	14	14	14	14	14	14	14	14	14	14	13	14	13	13	13	14	13	13	13	13	13	12	13	11
SCC Mohammédia	2	1	6	5	9	9	6	10	10	8	9	10	11	11	11	11	11	10	10	10	10	11	12	12	12	12	11	11	11	12
Moghreb Tétouan	10	7	9	7	7	8	11	12	11	11	13	13	13	12	12	12	12	12	12	11	11	10	11	11	11	11	12	13	12	13
IR Tanger	14	16	16	16	16	16	16	16	16	16	16	16	16	16	16	16	16	16	16	16	16	16	15	15	15	15	15	14	14	14
Olympique Khouribga	15	14	13	12	14	15	15	15	15	15	15	15	15	15	15	15	15	15	15	15	15	15	16	16	16	16	16	15	16	15
Difaâ Hassani El Jadidi	5	10	7	9	10	10	10	11	13	13	11	9	9	10	10	10	10	11	11	12	12	13	14	14	14	14	14	16	15	16

Leader and CAF Champions League
CAF Champions League
CAF Confederation Cup
Relegation to Botola 2

Source: FRMF.ma

== Season statistics ==
=== Top goalscorers ===
As of 23 June 2023

Rank	Player	Club	Goals
1	(Senegal) Bouly Sambou	Wydad AC	13
2	(Morocco) Hamza Hannouri	Fath US	11
2	(Morocco) Reda Slim	AS FAR	11
4	(Senegal) Paul Bassène	MC Oujda	9
4	(Cape Verde) Diney Borges	AS FAR	9
4	(Morocco) El Amine Zouhzouh	US Touarga	9
4	(Morocco) Youssef Mehri	HUS Agadir	9
8	(Morocco) Ayman El Hassouni	Wydad AC	8
8	(Burkina Faso) Issoufou Dayo	RS Berkane	8
10	(Morocco) Mustapha Sahd	JS Soualem/AS FAR^{1}	7
10	(Morocco) Mohamed Kamal	MA Tétouan	7
10	(The Gambia) Gibril Sillah	JS Soualem	7
10	(Morocco) El Mehdi Maouhoub	JS Soualem	7

^{1} Sahd played for JS Soualem until matchday 11 and scored 5 goals.

=== Hat-tricks ===
Player	For	Against	Result	Date	Round
(Morocco) Hamza Hannouri	Fath US	US Touarga	3–0 (H)	4 January 2023	10
(Senegal) Simon Diedhiou	US Touarga	OC Khouribga	6–4 (A)	23 June 2023	30

(H) – Home; (A) – Away
^{4} – Player scored four goals.

=== Goalkeepers' Goals-to-Games Ratio and Clean Sheets ===
As of 23 June 2023

Rank	Name	Club	Matches	Goals Against	Average	Clean Sheets
1	(Morocco) El Mehdi Benabid	Fath US	27	15	0.56	15
2	(Morocco) Ayoub Lakred	AS FAR	25	15	0.6	12
3	(Morocco) Anas Zniti	Raja CA	25	20	0.8	13
4	(Morocco) Hamza Hamiani	RS Berkane	23	23	1	9
5	(Morocco) Soufiane Barrouhou	SCC Mohammédia	26	28	1.08	7

=== Scoring ===
First goal of the season:

- (Morocco) Ayoub Lakhdar for HUS Agadir against RS Berkane (1 September 2022)

Last goal of the season:

- (Morocco) Reda Slim for AS FAR against IR Tanger (23 June 2023)

=== Discipline ===
As of 23 June 2023

==== Player ====
- Most yellow cards: 10
  - (Togo) Roger Aholou (Raja CA)
  - (Morocco) Anass Lamrabat (MA Tetouan)
- Most red cards: 3
  - (Morocco) Mouhcine Erbibi (JS Soualem)
  - (Morocco) Haytem Aina (Maghreb AS)

==== Club ====
- Most yellow cards: 80
  - Raja CA
- Most red cards: 12
  - US Touarga
- Fewest yellow cards: 48
  - SCC Mohammédia
- Fewest red cards: 2
  - RS Berkane
  - MC Oujda
  - SCC Mohammédia

== Annual awards ==
The UMFP (Union Marocaine des Footballeurs Professionnels), in partnership with the Royal Moroccan Football Federation, organized the Night of Stars Award in its 9th edition, which celebrated the brilliants of the Botola Pro for the 2022/23 season.

Award	Winner	Club
Manager of the Season	(Morocco) Jamal Sellami	Fath US
Player of the Season	(Morocco) Reda Slim	AS FAR
Foreign Player of the Season	(Cape Verde) Diney Borges	AS FAR
Promising Player of the Season	(Morocco) Hamza Igamane	AS FAR
Goalkeeper of the Season	(Morocco) El Mehdi Benabid	Fath US
Referee of the Season	(Morocco) Hamza El Fareq	
Club of the Season	AS FAR	

Team of the Season
Goalkeeper	(Morocco) El Mehdi Benabid (Fath US)				
Defence	(Morocco) El Mehdi El Bassil (Fath US)		(Cape Verde) Diney Borges (AS FAR)		(Democratic Republic of the Congo) Arsène Zola (Wydad AC)
Midfield	(Morocco) Reda Slim (AS FAR)	(Morocco) Sofian El Moudane (IR Tanger)	(Morocco) Imad Riahi (JS Solaem)	(Morocco) Mohamed Hrimat (AS FAR)	(Morocco) Mahmoud Bentayg (Raja CA)
Attack	(Senegal) Bouly Sambou (Wydad AC)			(Morocco) Youssef Mehri (Hassania Agadir)	

== See also ==
- 2023 Arab Club Champions Cup
- 2022 FIFA Club World Cup
- 2022 CAF Super Cup
- 2022–23 CAF Champions League
- 2022–23 CAF Confederation Cup
- 2022–23 Botola 2
- 2022–23 Moroccan Amateur National Championship
- 2021–22 Moroccan Throne Cup
