= Youssef Benali =

Youssef Benali may refer to:

- Youssef Benali (footballer)
- Youssef Benali (handballer)
