= Hicham El Majhad =

Moroccan footballer

Personal information
- Full name: Hicham El Majhad
- Date of birth: 9 April 1991 (age 35)
- Place of birth: Agadir, Morocco
- Height: 1.93 m (6 ft 4 in)
- Position: Goalkeeper

Team information
- Current team: Hassania Agadir

Youth career
- –2011: Hassania Agadir

Senior career*
Years	Team	Apps	(Gls)
2011–2013	Hassania Agadir		
2013	Aït Melloul		
2013–2017	Hassania Agadir	50	(0)
2017–2022	IR Tanger	88	(0)
2022–	Hassania Agadir		

International career^{‡}
2019–	Morocco	0	(0)
- * Club domestic league appearances and goals as of 20 August 2022 ‡ National team caps and goals as of 5 November 2020

Hicham El Majhad (Arabic: هشام المجهد; born 9 April 1991) is a Moroccan footballer who plays as a goalkeeper for Hassania Agadir.

== Career statistics ==
As of match played 18 August 2022

Appearances and goals by club, season and competition
Club	Season	League			Cup		Continental		Other		Total	
Club	Season	Division	Apps	Goals	Apps	Goals	Apps	Goals	Apps	Goals	Apps	Goals
IR Tanger	2017–18	Botola	1	0	0	0	—		—		1	0
IR Tanger	2018–19	Botola	11	0	0	0	2	0	—		13	0
IR Tanger	2019–20	Botola	29	0	3	0	0	0	2	0	34	0
IR Tanger	2020–21	Botola	19	0	2	0	—		—		21	0
IR Tanger	2021–22	Botola	28	0	2	0	—		—		30	0
Career total			88	0	7	0	2	0	2	0	99	0

== Honours ==
=== Club ===
Ittihad Tanger

- Botola: 2017–18
