= Mamadou Diagne =

Senegalese association football player

Personal information
- Full name: Mamadou Ousmane Diagne
- Date of birth: 14 September 2003 (age 23)
- Place of birth: Guédiawaye, Senegal
- Position: Midfielder

Team information
- Current team: Västerås SK
- Number: 8

Youth career
- –2021: Étoile Lusitana
- 2022: Malmö FF

Senior career*
Years	Team	Apps	(Gls)
2023–2024	Malmö FF	0	(0)
2023	→ BK Olympic (loan)	27	(7)
2024	→ Skövde AIK (loan)	22	(4)
2025–	Västerås SK	36	(6)
- * Club domestic league appearances and goals as of 8 July 2026

Mamadou Ousmane Diagne (born 14 September 2003) is a Senegalese professional footballer who plays as a midfielder for Allsvenskan club Västerås SK.

== Club career ==
=== Malmö FF ===
Diagne was discovered by Malmö FF as a result of their collaboration with Danish club Jammerbugt FC. After a year with the club's U19 team, for the 2023 season he was loaned out to BK Olympic. As a result of his strong season he was selected for the Morgondagens stjärnor (tr. The Stars of Tomorrow) squad, a match between the best young players in Ettan Södra and Ettan Norra.

In 2024 he was once again loaned out, this time to Superettan team Skövde AIK.

=== Västerås SK ===
In 2025 he transferred permanently to another Superettan club, Västerås SK. For his performances during the season he was heralded as one of the best players in the league. He was voted as the 2025 Superettan Player of the Year by the Player's Association. On 5 April 2026, Diagne played the full 90 minutes in Västerås SK's return to Allsvenskan, resulting in a 1–0 win.
