= AS Mansouria =

Moroccan football club

Association Al Mansoria
- Full name: Association Al Mansoria
- Founded: 1999
- Ground: Stade Municipal
- Capacity: 178 league = GNFA 1 Nord
Home colours	Away colours

Association Al Mansoria, also called AS Mansouria, is a Moroccan football club currently playing in the third division.
