= Pape Paye =

French footballer (born 1990)

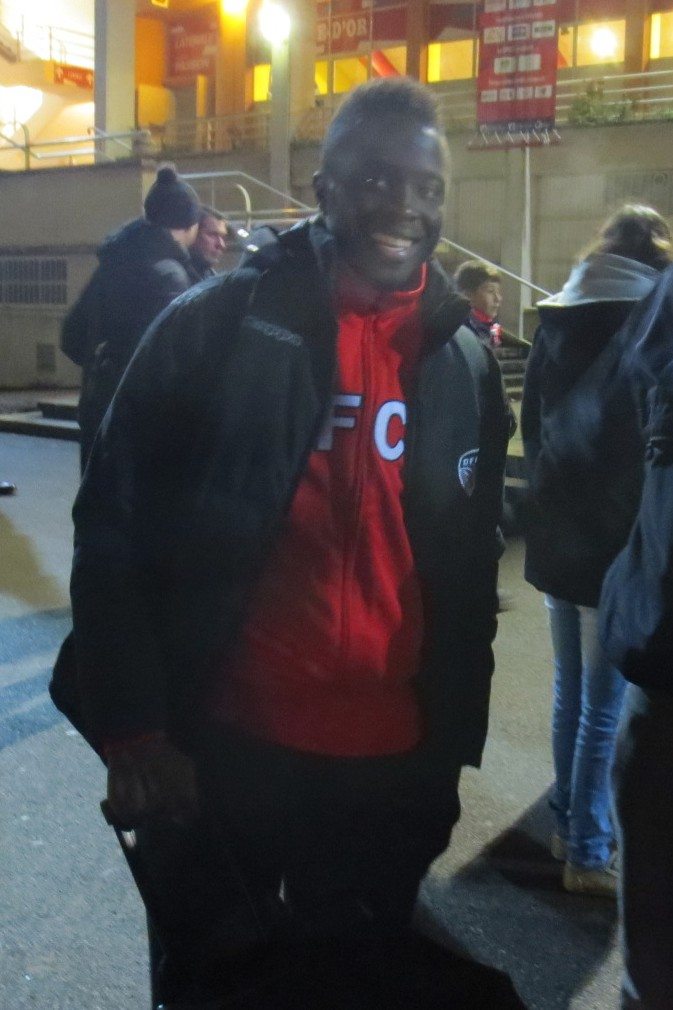

Personal information
- Full name: Pape Abdou Paye
- Date of birth: 31 May 1990 (age 36)
- Place of birth: Lyon, France
- Height: 1.68 m (5 ft 6 in)
- Position: Full back

Senior career*
| Years | Team | Apps | (Gls) |
| 2010–2011 | Monts d'Or Azergues | 23 | (4) |
| 2011–2012 | Lyon-Duchère | 28 | (2) |
| 2012–2015 | Dijon | 76 | (1) |
| 2015–2017 | Lorient | 10 | (0) |
| 2017–2018 | Bourg-en-Bresse | 23 | (0) |
| 2019 | Nancy | 9 | (0) |
| 2019–2021 | Sochaux | 50 | (0) |
| 2021 | IR Tanger | 7 | (0) |
- * Club domestic league appearances and goals as of 23:53, 1 March 2022 (UTC)

Pape Abdou Paye (born 31 May 1990) is a French professional footballer who last played as a right-back for Morocco Botola club IR Tanger.

== Career ==
In January 2019, he moved to AS Nancy.

== Personal life ==
Born in France, Paye is of Senegalese descent.
