= Biougnach =

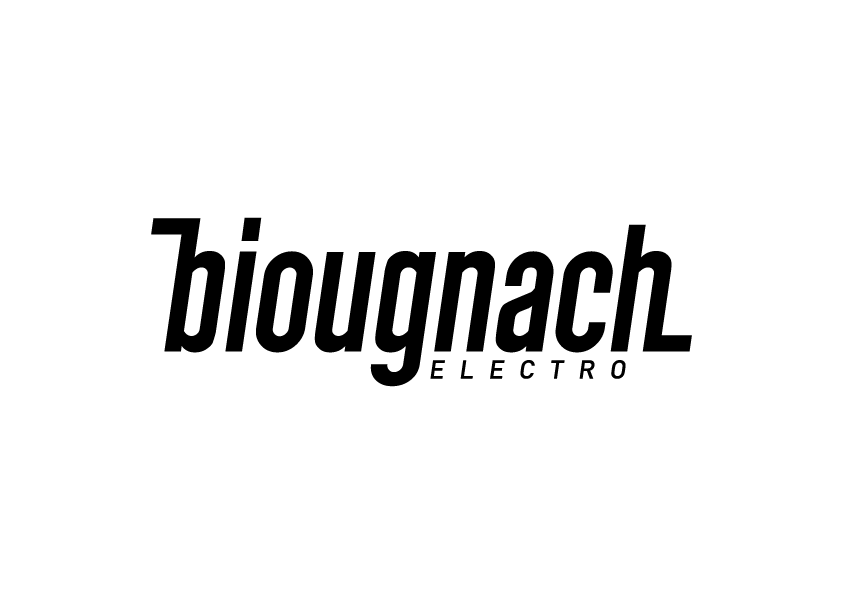
- Biougnach logo
- Company type: Private
- Industry: Retail
- Founded: 1973
- Founder: Ahmed Biougnach
- Headquarters: Meknes, Morocco
- Products: Home appliances, electronics, furniture
- Revenue: MAD 274.38 million (2015)
- Number of employees: Between 200 and 500
- Website: biougnach.ma

Biougnach is a Moroccan company specializing in the retail of home appliances, electronics, and furniture. Founded in 1973 in Meknes by Ahmed Biougnach, it is considered one of the first home appliance retail brands in Morocco.

== History ==
In 1973, Ahmed Biougnach founded the company in Meknes under the name "Établissement Biougnach Ahmed." In 1991, a restructuring led to the creation of Biougnach Équipement Sarl and the opening of the first modern retail outlet in Meknes.

== Expansion ==
In 2016, Biougnach signed a partnership with the real estate group Petra to expand its presence to other Moroccan cities, including Fes, Tangier, Marrakesh, and Agadir. In September 2022, the company inaugurated a showroom in Bouskoura, further strengthening its presence in the Casablanca region.

Biougnach operates stores in several Moroccan cities, including Casablanca, Rabat, Salé, Oujda, Fes, Meknes, Tangier, Agadir, and El Jadida.

== Key figures ==
In 2015, the company generated a revenue of 274.38 million Moroccan dirhams, marking a 12% increase compared to the previous year.

== Sponsorship ==
Biougnach has been a sponsor of some Moroccan football clubs, including Raja Club Athletic and Ittihad Tanger.
