= Éric Mbangossoum =

Chadian footballer (born 2000)

Personal information
- Date of birth: 26 May 2000 (age 26)
- Place of birth: N'Djamena, Chad
- Height: 1.85 m (6 ft 1 in)
- Position: Midfielder

Team information
- Current team: SuperSport United
- Number: 5

Senior career*
Years	Team	Apps	(Gls)
2017	Racing Bafoussam		
2018–2019	Elect-Sport		
2019	Futuro Kings		
2020–2023	Union de Touarga		
2024–	SuperSport United	3	(0)

International career^{‡}
2019–	Chad	16	(0)
- * Club domestic league appearances and goals as of 30 September 2024 ‡ National team caps and goals as of 30 September 2024

Éric Mbangossoum (born 26 May 2000) is a Chadian footballer who plays as a midfielder for SuperSport United in the Premier Soccer League.

In his early career, Mbangossoum had spells with Racing Bafoussam of Cameroon, Elect-Sport of his homeland and Futuro Kings of Equatorial Guinea. He was called up and made his international debut for Chad on 5 September 2019 against Sudan.

Mbangossoum then moved to Moroccan club Union Touarga Sport. He helped win promotion to the Botola 2 in 2020 and then from the Botola 2 in 2022, making his Botola debut in October 2022.

In the 2023–24 season, it was among others reported that Mbangossoum was wanted by Tanzanian club Simba SC. In the summer window of 2024, he went to South Africa and signed for SuperSport United—a move to TS Galaxy having also been on the books. His goal in SuperSport United was to play in African continental club competitions.
