= Hassan Fadil =

Moroccan footballer

Hassan Fadil (born 3 February 1962 in Taza) is a Moroccan footballer. He played for Raja Beni Mellal, RCD Mallorca and CD Málaga as well as Chateauroux and Valence in France's Second Division during his professional career.
