= Habib Allah Dahmani =

Moroccan footballer

Habib allah Dahmani
Personal information
- Full name: Habib allah Dahmani
- Date of birth: 16 October 1993 (age 33)
- Place of birth: Oujda, Morocco
- Height: 1.79 m (5 ft 10 in)
- Position: Forward

Senior career*
Years	Team	Apps	(Gls)
2010–2011	MC Oujda		
2011–2012	Al-Orouba		
2013–2014	Seeb Club		
2014–2016	MAS Fez		
2016–2017	Khénifra		
2017	Kenitra		
2017–2018	MC Oujda		
2018–2020	FUS		
2020	Raja Beni Mellal		
2020–2021	Muaither		
2021–2022	Ittihad Tanger	5	(0)
- * Club domestic league appearances and goals as of 12 September 2022

Habib Allah Dahmani (born 16 October 1993 in Oujda) is a Moroccan footballer who plays as a forward.
