= Redouane Jiyed =

Moroccan football referee (born 1979)

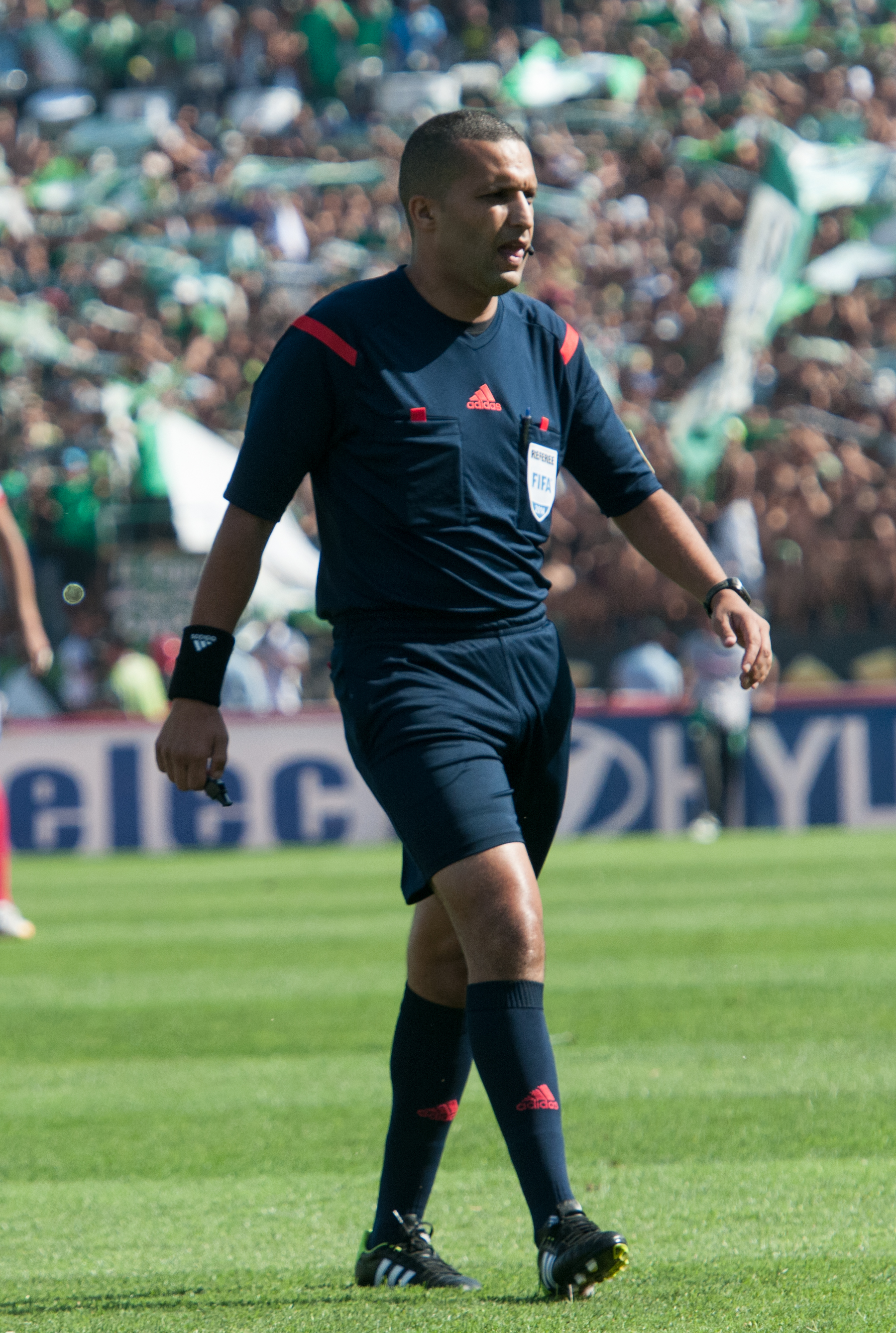
- Born: April 9, 1979 (age 47); Agadir, Souss-Massa, Morocco
- Other occupation: Company manager

Domestic
Years	League	Role
1994–	Botola	Referee

International
Years	League	Role
2009–	FIFA listed	Referee

Redouane Jiyed (born 9 April 1979, in Agadir, Souss-Massa, Morocco) is a Moroccan international association football referee.

== Career ==
Redouane Jiyed is the son of the Moroccan federal referee Mohamed Jiyed, who served as the head of the referees' regional committee in the Souss-Massa League of Football. His journey began in the 1993-1994 season in Agadir at the regional center for referee training of Souss. He worked as a league referee between 1994 and 1998 before moving up to the inter-league level until the 2002-2003 season when he became a federal referee.

He obtained the FIFA international badge in 2009 and was the youngest Moroccan international referee at that time. In 2019, he was selected among the elite A of referees in the Confederation of African Football (CAF).

Redouane Jiyed officiated many notable matches at the local level, especially the Casablanca derbies and the final rounds of the Throne Cup.

On the international stage, he was selected to referee matches in the Africa Cup of Nations in the 2017, 2019 and 2023 editions. He was also among the referees selected to direct matches in the 2022 FIFA World Cup in Qatar and the 2022 FIFA Club World Cup in Morocco.
