= Abdellatif Akhrif =

Moroccan footballer (2000–2024)

Personal information
- Date of birth: 1 February 2000
- Place of birth: Morocco
- Date of death: 6 July 2024 (aged 24)
- Place of death: M'diq, Morocco
- Height: 1.82 m (6 ft 0 in)
- Position: Forward

Youth career
- –2020: Ittihad Tanger

Senior career*
| Years | Team | Apps | (Gls) |
| 2020–2024 | Ittihad Tanger | 69 | (4) |
| Total | | 69 | (4) |
- * Club domestic league appearances and goals

Abdellatif Akhrif (Arabic: عبد اللطيف أخريف; 1 February 2000 – 6 July 2024) was a Moroccan footballer who played as a forward and featured only for Ittihad Tanger.

== Career ==
Abdellatif is a pure product of the Ittihad Tanger academy. On 20 May 2018 he made his senior professional debut in an away Botola fixture against Chabab Rif Al Hoceima at the Fez Stadium, in which Ittihad Tanger lost 2–0.

He signed his professional contract with Ittihad Tanger in 2020.

He scored his first professional goal on 7 April 2021, at 81st minute in a 2–1 away win against Nahdat Berkane, replacing Taoufik Ijrouten after 77 minutes.

== Death ==
On July 6, 2024, Abdellatif Akhrif tragically went missing at sea along with his newly promoted to the first team Salman Harraqi during a yacht excursion off the coast of Tangier. The incident occurred when strong currents and heavy winds swept their small yacht away while the players were swimming near Playa Restinga, located between the towns of M'diq and Fnideq.

The players, part of a group of five from Ittihad Tanger, had rented a yacht for a recreational outing. They were initially stopped by the coastguard, who confirmed their papers were in order and that they had life jackets on board. However, the players did not have buoys when they jumped into the water. According to survivors' accounts, the sea conditions suddenly changed, with heavy winds and strong currents pushing the yacht far from the swimmers.

Emergency services launched a rescue operation, saving three individuals: Oussama Aflah, a club employee; Soulaimane Dahdouh; and Abdelhamid Maali, a Morocco under-17 international. These survivors were at sea for several hours before being rescued. Despite exhaustive search efforts by the Royal Navy and marine gendarmerie, which included the use of helicopters and boats, Akhrif and Harraqi remained missing.

Although their bodies have not been found, it is presumed that both Akhrif and Harraqi have died. The search and rescue operations continued, but hopes diminished as days passed without locating the missing players.

The incident caused a wave of distress and anxiety among the families, teammates, and Moroccans in general. Ittihad Tanger's president, Mohamed Cherkaoui, urged caution in sharing information, emphasizing the emotional toll on the families. Local media and the club called for respect and patience as the search continued. Despite some misinformation and rumors, the authorities and the club maintained that there was no evidence suggesting an attempt at illegal migration, focusing instead on the tragic accident and the ongoing efforts to find the missing players.
