= Diney (footballer, born 1995) =

Cape Verdean footballer (born 1995)

Personal information
- Full name: Edilson Alberto Monteiro Sanches Borges
- Date of birth: 17 January 1995 (age 31)
- Place of birth: Tarrafal, Cape Verde
- Height: 1.85 m (6 ft 1 in)
- Position: Centre-back

Team information
- Current team: Sharjah
- Number: 23

Youth career
- 2008–2010: Arrentela
- 2010–2014: Vitória Setúbal

Senior career*
Years	Team	Apps	(Gls)
2015–2018	Marítimo B	75	(5)
2015–2018	Marítimo	22	(0)
2018–2019	Estoril	15	(1)
2019–2023	FAR Rabat	84	(12)
2023–2026	Al Bataeh	69	(5)
2026–	Sharjah	5	(0)

International career^{‡}
2017–	Cape Verde	38	(2)
- * Club domestic league appearances and goals as of 03:31, 4 November 2026 (UTC) ‡ National team caps and goals as of 19:15, 29 September 2026 (UTC)

Edilson Alberto Monteiro Sanches Borges (Portuguese: [e.ˈdil.sɔn al.ˈbɛɾ.tu mõ.ˈtej.ɾu ˈsɐ̃.ʃɨʒ ˈbɔɾ.ʒɨʃ]; born 17 January 1995), known as Diney (Kabuverdianu: [di.ˈnej]), is a Cape Verdean professional footballer who plays as a centre-back for UAE Pro League club Sharjah and the Cape Verde national team.

== Club career ==
Diney started his youth career with Vitória F.C. in 2010, before joining Marítimo B. On 30 November 2014, Diney made his professional debut with Marítimo B in a 2014–15 Segunda Liga match against Santa Clara. After good performances, Diney was promoted to Marítimo's first team squad, making his league debut against C.F. União.

On 13 June 2018, Diney joined Estoril.

On 4 July 2023, Emirati club Al Bataeh Club announced the signing of Diney.

== International career ==
Diney made his debut for the Cape Verde national team in a 4–0 2018 FIFA World Cup qualification loss to Burkina Faso on 14 November 2017.

On 18 May 2026, he was named in the 26-man squad for the 2026 FIFA World Cup.

== Career statistics ==
=== Club ===
As of 5 September 2026

Appearances and goals by club, season and competition
Club	Season	League			National cup		League cup		Continental		Total	
Club	Season	Division	Apps	Goals	Apps	Goals	Apps	Goals	Apps	Goals	Apps	Goals
Marítimo B	2014–15	Liga Portugal 2	27	1	—		—		—		27	1
Marítimo B	2015–16	Campeonato de Portugal	18	1	—		—		—		18	1
Marítimo B	2016–17	Campeonato de Portugal	29	3	—		—		—		29	3
Marítimo B	2017–18	Campeonato de Portugal	1	0	—		—		—		1	0
Marítimo B	Total		75	5	—		—		—		75	5
Marítimo	2015–16	Primeira Liga	1	0	—		—		—		1	0
Marítimo	2016–17	Primeira Liga	0	0	0	0	0	0	—		0	0
Marítimo	2017–18	Primeira Liga	19	0	0	0	2	0	0	0	21	0
Marítimo	Total		20	0	0	0	2	0	0	0	22	0
Estoril	2018–19	Liga Portugal 2	15	1	—		1	0	—		16	1
FAR Rabat	2019–20	Botola Pro	22	0	—		—		—		22	0
FAR Rabat	2020–21	Botola Pro	27	1	—		—		—		27	1
FAR Rabat	2021–22	Botola Pro	24	3	—		—		4 (Note: Appearance(s) in CAF Confederation Cup)	0	28	3
FAR Rabat	2022–23	Botola Pro	26	9	—		—		13	5	39	14
FAR Rabat	Total		99	13	—		—		17	5	116	18
Al Bataeh	2023–24	UAE Pro League	19	1	1	0	0	0	—		20	1
Al Bataeh	2024–25	UAE Pro League	25	2	0	0	1	0	—		26	2
Al Bataeh	2025–26	UAE Pro League	25	2	1	0	0	0	—		26	2
Al Bataeh	Total		69	5	2	0	1	0	—		72	5
Sharjah	2026–27	UAE Pro League	4	0	0	0	0	0	—		4	0
Career total			282	24	2	0	4	0	17	5	305	29

=== International ===
As of match played 29 September 2026

Appearances and goals by national team and year
National team	Year	Apps	Goals
Cape Verde	2017	1	0
Cape Verde	2018	1	0
Cape Verde	2019	2	0
Cape Verde	2021	2	0
Cape Verde	2022	9	0
Cape Verde	2023	4	0
Cape Verde	2024	3	1
Cape Verde	2025	7	1
Cape Verde	2026	9	0
Total		38	2

Scores and results list Cape Verde's goal tally first.

No.	Date	Venue	Opponent	Score	Result	Competition
1.	11 June 2024	Estádio Nacional de Cabo Verde, Praia, Cape Verde	Libya	1–0	1–0	2026 FIFA World Cup qualification
2.	4 September 2025	Côte d'Or National Sports Complex, Saint Pierre, Mauritius	Mauritius	2–0	2–0	2026 FIFA World Cup qualification

== Honours ==
AS FAR

- Botola Pro: 2022–23
- Moroccan Throne Cup: 2020–21

Individual

- Botola Pro Foreign Player of the Season: 2022–23
- Botola Pro Team of the Season: 2022–23
