= Youssef Benali (footballer) =

French footballer (born 1995)

Personal information
- Full name: Youssef Benali
- Date of birth: 4 February 1995 (age 31)
- Place of birth: Albi, France
- Height: 1.68 m (5 ft 6 in)
- Position: Attacking midfielder

Youth career
- –2014: Toulouse

Senior career*
Years	Team	Apps	(Gls)
2014–2016	Toulouse	4	(0)
2016–2018	Chabab Rif Al Hoceima	38	(3)
2018–2020	Concarneau	44	(3)
2020–2021	Bourges Foot		
2021–2023	IR Tanger	45	(3)
2023–2024	UR La Louvière Centre	22	(1)
- * Club domestic league appearances and goals as of 1 July 2024

Youssef Benali (born 4 February 1995) is a French footballer who plays as a winger.

== Club career ==
Benali began his career at the Toulouse FC youth academy, where he most commonly played as an attacking midfielder. He made his Ligue 1 debut on 23 November 2014 against Montpellier HSC, replacing Étienne Didot after 81 minutes in a 2–0 away defeat. During his time at Toulouse, Benali appeared in four Ligue 1 matches and a single match in the Coupe de la Ligue. After falling out of contract with Toulouse, he moved to Moroccan club Chabab Rif Al Hoceima on 29 August 2016 with a two-year deal.

During the summer 2018, he moved to Concarneau.

== International career ==
Benali made five appearances for the France national U-16 team and one appearance for the France national U-18 team.

== Personal life ==
Benali holds both French and Moroccan nationalities.

== Career statistics ==
As of November 24, 2014

Club	Season	Ligue 1			Coupe de France			Coupe de la Ligue			Continental			Others			Total		
Club	Season	App	Goals	Assist	App	Goals	Assist	App	Goals	Assist	App	Goals	Assist	App	Goals	Assist	App	Goals	Assist
Toulouse	2014–15	1	0	0	0	0	0	0	0	0	–	–	–	–	–	–	1	0	0
Toulouse Total		1	0	0	0	0	0	0	0	0	0	0	0	0	0	0	1	0	0
