= Anas El Asbahi =

Moroccan professional footballer

Personal information
- Date of birth: 15 October 1993 (age 33)
- Place of birth: Morocco
- Height: 1.80 m (5 ft 11 in)
- Position: Midfielder

Team information
- Current team: Nordic United FC
- Number: 2

Senior career*
| Years | Team | Apps | (Gls) |
| 2008–2012 | Raja Casablanca | 1 | (0) |
| 2012–2020 | Wydad Casablanca | 39 | (4) |
| 2020 | → Ittihad Tanger (loan) | 11 | (0) |
| 2020–2022 | Ittihad Tanger | 27 | (0) |
| 2022 | Jönköpings Södra | 12 | (0) |
| 2023– | Nordic United FC | 20 | (1) |

International career^{‡}
| 2014– | Morocco | 1 | (0) |
- * Club domestic league appearances and goals as of 29 November 2023 ‡ National team caps and goals as of 26 January 2015

Anas El Asbahi (Arabic: أنس الأصباحي; born 15 October 1993) is a Moroccan professional footballer who plays as a midfielder for the Swedish club Nordic United FC.

== International career ==
In January 2014, coach Hassan Benabicha, invited him to be a part of the Morocca squad for the 2014 African Nations Championship. He helped the team to top group B after drawing with Burkina Faso and Zimbabwe and defeating Uganda. The team was eliminated from the competition at the quarter-final zone after losing to Nigeria.

== Honours ==
Wydad

- CAF Champions League: 2017

Morocco

- Islamic Solidarity Games: 2013
