= El Mehdi Karnass =

Moroccan footballer

Mehdi Karnass
Personal information
- Full name: El Mehdi Karnass
- Date of birth: 12 March 1990 (age 36)
- Place of birth: El Jadida, Morocco
- Position: Midfielder

Team information
- Current team: Wydad Casablanca
- Number: 27

Senior career*
Years	Team	Apps	(Gls)
2009–2014	Difaâ Hassani El Jadidi	83	(10)
2014–2015	Aalesunds FK	13	(0)
2015–2016	AS-FAR Club	17	(0)
2016	Wydad Casablanca	11	(1)

International career
2011	Morocco U23		
2011–2014	Morocco	2	(1)
- * Club domestic league appearances and goals

El Mehdi Karnass (born 12 March 1990) is a Moroccan footballer currently playing for Botola club Wydad Casablanca as a winger.

== International career ==
=== International goals ===
Scores and results list Morocco's goal tally first.

No	Date	Venue	Opponent	Score	Result	Competition
1.	13 October 2014	Stade de Marrakech, Marrakesh, Morocco	Kenya	1–0	3–0	Friendly
