= Axel Méyé =

Gabonese footballer

Personal information
- Full name: Axel Méyé Me Ndong
- Date of birth: 6 June 1995 (age 31)
- Place of birth: Libreville, Gabon
- Height: 1.76 m (5 ft 9 in)
- Position: Forward

Team information
- Current team: Mesaimeer
- Number: 10

Senior career*
Years	Team	Apps	(Gls)
2012	US Bitam		
2012–2016	Missile FC		
2016–2017	Eskişehirspor	44	(7)
2017–2018	Manisaspor	16	(5)
2018	Paris FC	1	(0)
2018–2019	Al-Qadsia	4	(0)
2019–2020	CR Al Hoceima	6	(4)
2020–2022	IR Tanger	52	(25)
2022–2023	Raja CA	11	(0)
2023	→ OC Safi (loan)	11	(3)
2023–2024	Al-Ahly SC		
2024	CS Constantine	9	(0)
2024–	Mesaimeer	1	(1)

International career^{‡}
	Gabon U-20	3	(1)
2012–	Gabon	37	(5)
- * Club domestic league appearances and goals as of 14 June 2024 ‡ National team caps and goals as of 18 October 2025

Axel Méyé Me Ndong (born 6 June 1995) is a Gabonese professional footballer who plays as a forward for Mesaimeer and the Gabon national team.

He has competed at the 2012 Summer Olympics In 2012, he played 41 minutes for the national team in a friendly match against South Africa.

== Club career ==
In January 2018, Méyé joined Paris FC. On 27 August 2022, he joined Raja Club Athletic. On 4 February 2024, he joined CS Constantine.

== Career statistics ==
Scores and results list Gabon's goal tally first, score column indicates score after each Méyé goal.

List of international goals scored by Axel Méyé
No.	Date	Venue	Opponent	Score	Result	Competition
1	5 September 2017	Stade Bouaké, Bouaké, Ivory Coast	Ivory Coast	1–0	2–1	2018 FIFA World Cup qualification
