= Mohammed Ali Bemammer =

Moroccan footballer

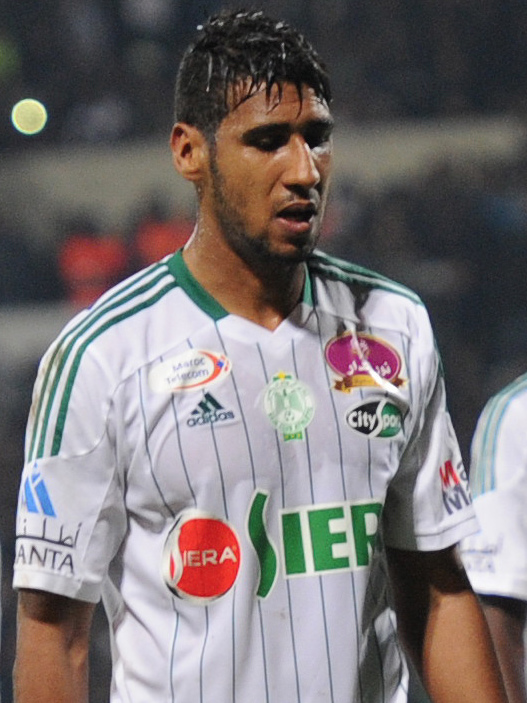
- Bemammer with Raja CA in 2015

Personal information
- Full name: Mohammed Ali Bemammer
- Date of birth: 19 November 1989 (age 36)
- Place of birth: Fes, Morocco
- Height: 1.90 m (6 ft 3 in)
- Positions: Defensive midfielder; centre-back

Youth career
- –2009: MAS Fes

Senior career*
Years	Team	Apps	(Gls)
2009–2014	MAS Fes		
2014–2015	Raja CA	29	(1)
2015–2019	DH Jadida	92	(2)
2019–2020	FAR Rabat	26	(0)
2020–2022	IR Tanger	49	(1)
2022–2023	MAS Fes	28	(1)
2023–2025	NorthEast United	43	(4)
2026	Chennaiyin	11	(0)

International career
?	Morocco U20	3	(0)
?	Morocco U23	3	(0)
2013–2021	Morocco	11	(2)
- * Club domestic league appearances and goals as of 13:20, 30 March 2025 (UTC)

Mohammed Ali Bemaamer (Arabic: محمد علي بامعمر) is a Moroccan professional footballer who plays as a midfielder or defender.

== Career ==
He was part of the triple crown MAS Fes won in 2011, during which time he scored a penalty kick by way of rebound from the post with back spin, allowing the goalkeeper to mistakenly stand up in celebration before the ball crossed the line. This has earned Bemammer much revered status amongst the Masawi faithful.

On 17 December 2015, he signed for DH El Jadida for a fee of 75,000 euros. During his first season, he was a frequent starter. He played a total of 15 league games. He finished the season in thirteenth place in the league.

In the 2016–2017 season, he was Botola Pro runner-up and Moroccan Cup finalist, while completing a full season with 35 games played and one goal scored.

On 9 August 2023, Bemammer signed for Indian Super League club NorthEast United on a one-year contract.

== Honours ==
MAS Fes

- CAF Confederation Cup: 2011
- Moroccan Throne Cup: 2011
- CAF Super Cup: 2012

Morocco

- African Nations Championship: 2020

NorthEast United

- Durand Cup: 2024
