= 2026–27 IR Tanger season =

Ittihad Tanger
2026–27 season
- President: Nassrallah El Guartit
- Manager: Abdelhak Benchikha
- Stadium: Tangier Grand Stadium
- Botola Pro: 8th
- Throne Cup: Round of 16
- Top goalscorer: League: Najari, Dieng (2 goals); All: Najari, Dieng (2 goals)
- Biggest win: Home: IR Tanger 2–1 MAS Fez; Away: USA Tiznit 1–3 IR Tanger
- Biggest defeat: Home: Away: AS FAR 2–0 IR Tanger; Raja CA 2–0 IR Tanger
Home colours	Away colours	Third colours
- All statistics correct as of 8 November 2026.

The 2026–27 season is Ittihad Riadi Tanger's 44nd season in existence and the club's 28th in the top flight of Moroccan football, and twelfth consecutive.

== Kit ==
- Supplier: Joma
- Club Sponsor: Tanger-Med (front), Tanger Alliance (back)
- League Sponsor: Inwi (sleeves)

Home	Away	Third

== Squad ==
As of match played 14 October 2026

No.	Name	Nationality	Position	Date of birth (age)	Signed from	Signed in	Contract ends	Apps.	Goals
Goalkeepers
12	Malcolm Barcola	(Togo) (France)	GK	14 May 1999 (age 27)	FC Paços de Ferreira	2025	2027	3	(-4)
13	Aymane Douieb	(Morocco)	GK	1 June 2008 (age 18)		2026		0	(0)
25	Ahmed Azmi	(Morocco) (Netherlands)	GK	3 September 2002 (age 24)	Jong FC Utrecht	2026	2027	0	(0)
61	Badreddine Abyir	(Morocco)	GK	27 August 1998 (age 28)	HUS Agadir	2026		5	(-6)
Defenders
2	Reda El Meliani	(Morocco) (Netherlands)	DF	16 February 2005 (age 21)	Roda JC Kerkrade	2026		0	0
4	Mohamed Saoud (captain)	(Morocco)	DF	30 January 1996 (age 30)	MA Tétouan	2023	2027	67	7
6	Bilal El Ouadghiri	(Morocco)	DF	3 August 2001 (age 25)	Free agent	2025	2027	45	6
15	Achraf Laâziri	(Morocco)	DF	8 July 2003 (age 23)	Olympique Lyonnais	2026		7	0
22	Zakaria Kiani	(Morocco)	DF	22 January 1997 (age 29)	CAY Berrechid	2022	2026	108	3
23	Anass Lamrabat	(Morocco)	DF	13 July 1993 (age 33)	MA Tétouan	2023	2026	69	0
24	Akram El Wahabi	(Spain) (Morocco)	DF	7 January 2004 (age 22)	Academy	2024		22	0
27	Saad Ait Khorsa	(Morocco)	DF	3 January 1994 (age 32)	MAS Fez	2026	2027	5	1
36	Saad Karouat	(Morocco)	DF	19 January 2008 (age 18)	Academy	2026		0	0
98	Yassine Karmadi	(Morocco)	DF	11 December 2008 (age 17)	Academy	2026		0	0
Midfielders
8	Gape Mohutsiwa	(Botswana)	MF	20 March 1997 (age 29)	MC Oran	2026		4	0
10	Mohamed El Arouch	(France) (Morocco)	MF	6 April 2004 (age 22)	RWDM Brussels	2026	2027	25	1
18	Soufyan Ahannach	(Netherlands) (Morocco)	MF	9 September 1995 (age 31)	US Yacoub El Mansour	2026	2027	7	0
20	Ennama El Bellali	(Morocco)	MF	17 February 1998 (age 28)	JS Soualem	2025	2028	38	0
21	Hamza Moudene	(Morocco)	MF	9 December 1995 (age 30)	RCA Zemamra	2025	2027	32	1
29	Babacar Sarr	(Senegal)	MF	24 July 1997 (age 29)	JS Kabylie	2026		6	0
34	Mohammed El Guartit	(Morocco)	MF	1 January 2005 (age 21)	Academy	2025		1	0
48	Achraf El Quaraoui	(Morocco)	MF	27 October 2006 (age 20)	Academy	2024		5	0
Forwards
7	Younes Najari	(Morocco)	FW	6 February 1996 (age 30)	OC Safi	2026		6	2
16	Akram Tali	(Morocco)	FW	21 May 2007 (age 19)	Academy	2026		6	0
17	Abdelhamid Maâli	(Morocco)	FW	16 March 2006 (age 20)	Academy	2026 (2)	2027	72	1
31	Ibrahima Dieng	(Senegal)	FW	21 August 2008 (age 18)	AS Pikine	2026		7	2
67	Haytham Bakhlakh	(England) (Morocco)	FW	25 June 2006 (age 20)	FC Clacton	2025		4	1
77	Ousama Siddiki	(Morocco) (Spain)	FW	13 April 1998 (age 28)	Antequera CF	2026		3	0
99	Senad Jarović	(Germany) (Bosnia and Herzegovina)	FW	20 January 1998 (age 28)	SC Gjilani	2026		5	0
Players who have left the club during the season

- (A) = originally from the academy

=== From youth squad ===
No.	Name	Nationality	Position	Date of birth (age)	Signed from	Signed in	Contract ends	Apps.	Goals

== Transfers ==
=== In ===
No.	Pos	Player	Transferred from	Fee	Date	Source
29	MF	(Senegal) Babacar Sarr	(Algeria) JS Kabylie	Free Transfer	8 July 2026	
8	MF	(Botswana) Gape Mohutsiwa	(Algeria) MC Oran	Free Transfer	10 July 2026	
99	FW	(Germany) Senad Jarović	(Kosovo) SC Gjilani	Free Transfer	11 July 2026	
77	FW	(Morocco) Ousama Siddiki	(Spain) Antequera CF	Free Transfer	13 July 2026	
2	DF	(Morocco) Reda El Meliani	(Netherlands) Roda JC	Free Transfer	15 July 2026	
61	GK	(Morocco) Badreddine Abyir	HUS Agadir	Free Transfer	16 July 2026	
31	FW	(Senegal) Ibrahima Dieng	(Senegal) AS Pikine	Free Transfer	21 July 2026	
15	DF	(Morocco) Achraf Laâziri	(France) Olympique Lyonnais	Free Transfer	23 July 2026	
27	DF	(Morocco) Saad Ait Khorsa	MAS Fez	Free Transfer	11 August 2026	
18	FW	(Netherlands) Soufyan Ahannach	US Yacoub El Mansour	Free Transfer	13 August 2026	
7	FW	(Morocco) Younes Najari	OC Safi	Free Transfer	19 August 2026	

=== Contract renewals ===
No.	Pos.	Nationality	Name	Date	Until	Source
22	DF	(Morocco)	Zakaria Kiani	24 July 2026		
23	DF	(Morocco)	Anass Lamrabat	24 July 2026		
97	DF	(Morocco)	Badr Gaddarine	24 July 2026		

=== Out ===
No.	Pos	Player	Transferred to	Fee	Date	Source
19	FW	(Morocco) Jawad Rhabra	KAC Marrakech	Free Transfer	11 July 2026	
1	GK	(Morocco) Amine El Ouaad	KAC Marrakech	Contract termination	20 July 2026	
38	FW	(France) Livty Kpolo	(France) FC Bourgoin-Jallieu	Contract termination	21 July 2026	
8	MF	(Morocco) Abdelmottalib Faouzi	(Jordan) Al-Wehdat SC	Free Transfer	21 July 2026	
99	FW	(Belgium) Zakaria Bakkali		Free Transfer	21 July 2026	
79	MF	(Ivory Coast) Siriki Sanogo		Free Transfer	21 July 2026	
72	FW	(Senegal) Papa Magueye Gaye	(Spain) Pontevedra CF	Free Transfer	21 July 2026	
16	MF	(Morocco) Ahmed Chentouf	IZ Khemisset	Free Transfer	21 July 2026	
73	GK	(Morocco) Youssef Laghzal	Raja Beni Mellal	Free Transfer	21 July 2026	
13	DF	(Morocco) Oussama Al Aiz	IZ Khemisset	Free Transfer	24 July 2026	
14	FW	(Morocco) Haitam El Bahja	MA Tétouan	Free Transfer	11 September 2026	
9	FW	(Republic of the Congo) Dylan Saint-Louis		Contract termination	8 August 2026	
28	FW	(Morocco) Karim Lagrouch		Contract termination	8 August 2026	
49	DF	(Morocco) Louay El Moussaoui	Stade Marocain	Contract termination	23 August 2026	
29	MF	(France) Adam Darazi				
97	DF	(Morocco) Badr Gaddarine	COD Meknes	Contract termination	31 August 2026	
75	FW	(Senegal) Moussa Koté				
64	FW	(Morocco) Nawfal Chninak				
26	GK	(Morocco) Yassine Hachloufi	CS Ajax Tanger	Contract termination	31 August 2026	

== Technical staff ==
Position	Name
First team head coach	(Algeria) Abdelhak Benchikha
Assistant coach	(France) Serge Romano
Assistant coach	(Morocco) Youssef Sekour
Fitness coach	(Morocco) Mouchriq Abdelhakim
Sports Psychologist	(Morocco) Ali Ataoui
Club doctor	(Morocco) Marouan Afkir
Sports Nurse	(Morocco) Abdelmonhem Nafie
Sports Masseur	(Morocco) Mohamed Didi
Physiotherapist	(Morocco) Saber Khamal
Hope's team coach	(France) David Vandenbossche
Hope's team assistant coach	(Morocco) Ahmed Salah
Hope's Team Fitness coach	(Morocco) Hamza Raiss El Fenni

== Pre-season and friendlies ==
14 August 2026 1	Fath US	0–1	IR Tanger	Rabat
17:00 UTC+1		Report	El Ouadghiri	Stadium: FUS Academy

20 August 2026 2	Wydad AC	1–0	IR Tanger	Casablanca
17:00 UTC+1	Goal	Report		Stadium: WAC Sports Center

13 September 2026 3	IR Tanger	3–1	US Yacoub El Mansour	Tangier
17:00 UTC+1	Najari 80' 86'; Dieng 90+5'	Report	54'	Stadium: Village Stadium

19 September 2026 4	IR Tanger	1–0	WS Témara	Tangier
16:30 UTC+1	Dieng 26'; (red card) 69'	Report		Stadium: Village Stadium

5 October 2026 5	IR Tanger	1–3	Morocco U-23	Tangier
17:00 UTC	26'		Maamma 26'; Boumassaoudi 26'; Laalaoui 26'	Stadium: Village Stadium

=== Ibn Battuta Cup ===
1 September 2026 1	IR Tanger	1–1	RCA Zemamra	Tanger, Morocco
21:00 UTC+1	Saoud	Report	Goal	Stadium: Village Tangier Stadium

3 September 2026 2	IR Tanger	0–1	COD Meknes	Tanger, Morocco
21:00 UTC+1		Report	Eddib 62'	Stadium: Village Tangier Stadium

5 September 2026 3	IR Tanger	2–1	KAC Marrakech	Tanger, Morocco
21:00 UTC+1	Dieng; Maâli	Report	Raiani	Stadium: Village Tangier Stadium

Pos	Team	Pld	W	D	L	GF	GA	GD	Pts	Result	CODM	IRT	RCAZ	KACM
1	COD Meknes	3	2	1	0	4	1	+3	7	Winners	—	-	-	-
2	IR Tanger	3	1	1	1	3	3	0	4	Runners-up	0–1	—	1–1	2–1
3	RCA Zemamra	3	1	1	1	5	5	0	4		0–2	-	—	4–2
4	KAC Marrakech	3	0	1	2	4	7	−3	1		1–1	-	-	—

Updated to match(es) played on 3 September 2026. Source:
Rules for classification: 1) Points; 2) Goal difference; 3) Goals scored.

== Competitions ==
Win Draw Loss

=== Overview ===
Competition	First match	Last match	Starting round	Record							
Competition	First match	Last match	Starting round	Pld	W	D	L	GF	GA	GD	Win %
Botola Pro	24 September 2026	2027	Matchday 1	7	3	1	3	8	9	−1	42.86
Throne Cup	2026	2026	Round of 32	0	0	0	0	0	0	+0	—
Total				7	3	1	3	8	9	−1	42.86

Last updated: 8 November 2026.
Source: Competitions

=== Botola Pro ===
==== Standings ====
Pos	Team	Pld	W	D	L	GF	GA	GD	Pts
5	AS FAR	6	3	2	1	9	5	+4	11
6	MAS Fez	7	3	2	2	6	5	+1	11
7	IR Tanger	7	3	1	3	8	9	−1	10
8	HUS Agadir	7	2	3	2	14	12	+2	9
9	UTS Rabat	7	2	2	3	4	6	−2	8

Updated to match(es) played on 9 November 2026. Source: FRMF.ma
Rules for classification: 1) Points; 2a) Head-to-head goal difference if they are two teams with equal points; 2b) Goal difference if they are more than two teams with equal points; 3) Number of wins; 4) Goals scored; 5) Play-off between involved teams.

==== Results summary ====
Overall								Home						Away					
Pld	W	D	L	GF	GA	GD	Pts	W	D	L	GF	GA	GD	W	D	L	GF	GA	GD
7	3	1	3	8	9	−1	10	2	1	0	4	2	+2	1	0	3	4	7	−3

Last updated: 8 November 2026.
Source: flashscore.com

==== Results by round ====
Round	1	2	3	4	5	6	7	8	9	10	11	12	13	14	15	16	17	18	19	20	21	22	23	24	25	26	27	28	29	30
Ground	A	H	A	H	A	H	A	H	A	H	H	A	H	A	H	H	A	H	A	H	A	H	A	H	A	A	H	A	H	A
Result	W	D	L	W	L	W	L																							
Position	2	3	6	4	8	4																								

Updated to match(es) played on 8 November 2026. Source: Results
A = Away; H = Home; W = Win; D = Draw; L = Loss

==== Matches ====
24 September 2026 1	USA Tiznit	1–3	IR Tanger	Mohammedia
20:00 UTC	El Azhari 45+1'; Adila (yellow card) 52'; Ait-Ouarab (yellow card) 77'	Report	Ait Khorsa 9'; Maâli 47'; El Bellali (yellow card) 49'; Dieng 55'; Laâziri (yellow card) 74'	Stadium: El Bachir Stadium; Referee: Azzedine Aboulfaid

2 October 2026 2	IR Tanger	1–1	MA Tétouan	Tangier
20:00 UTC	Najari 57'; Sarr (yellow card) 90+1'; Abyir (yellow card) 90+4'	Report	Karmoun 34'; Eddaoudi (yellow card) 37'; Marzak (yellow card) 85'; Erbati (yellow card) 90+5'; Crachna (penalty missed) 90+7'	Stadium: Tangier Grand Stadium; Referee: Said Boujidi

10 October 2026 3	KAC Marrakech	2–1	IR Tanger	Marrakesh
17:00 UTC	Maamouri 40' (pen.) (yellow card) 59'; Tamrani (yellow card) 83'; Rabja 87'	Report	Najari 62'; Laâziri (yellow card) 64'; Sarr (yellow card) 83'	Stadium: El Harti Stadium; Referee: Hicham Temsamani

14 October 2026 4	IR Tanger	2–1	MAS Fes	Tangier
20:00 UTC	Moudene (yellow card) 45' (goal) 77'; Saoud (yellow card) 53' (goal) 74'; Mohutsiwa (yellow card) 70'; Maâli (yellow card) 75'	Report	Baba (yellow card) 2'; Ibayi 32'; Harmach (yellow card) 78'	Stadium: Tangier Grand Stadium; Referee: Hamza El Fareq

28 October 2026 5	AS FAR	2–0	IR Tanger	Rabat
20:00 UTC	Mendy (yellow card) 30'; El Fahli (penalty missed) 35' 80' (pen.); Lougmani (yellow card) 87'; El Bouchqali (yellow card) 90+4'; Hadraf 90+5' (yellow card) 90+6'	Report	El Wahabi (yellow card) 11'; El Ouadghiri (yellow card) 33'; Mohutsiwa (red card) 52'	Stadium: Prince Moulay Abdellah Stadium; Referee: Mohamed El Houidri

1 November 2026 6	IR Tanger	1–0	RCA Zemamra	Tangier
18:00 UTC	Dieng 76' (pen.); Laâziri (yellow card) 88'	Report	Ajako (yellow card) 74'	Stadium: Tangier Grand Stadium; Referee: Youssef Triki

8 November 2026 7	Raja CA	2–0	IR Tanger	Casablanca
20:00 UTC	Barkok 7' (pen.); Mokadem (yellow card) 41'; El Amloud 45+7'	Report	El Ouadghiri (yellow card) 66'	Stadium: Larbi Zaouli Stadium; Referee: Mohamed El Baroudi

2026 8	IR Tanger	v	HUS Agadir	Tangier
: UTC				Stadium: Tangier Grand Stadium

2026 9	Fath US	v	IR Tanger	Rabat
: UTC				Stadium: Moulay El Hassan Stadium

2026 10	IR Tanger	v	RS Berkane	Tangier
: UTC				Stadium: Tangier Grand Stadium

2026 11	IR Tanger	v	US Touarga	Tangier
: UTC				Stadium: Tangier Grand Stadium

2026 12	WS Temara	v	IR Tanger	Rabat
: UTC				Stadium: Rabat Olympic Stadium

2026 13	IR Tanger	v	COD Meknes	Tangier
: UTC				Stadium: Tangier Grand Stadium

2026 14	Wydad AC	v	IR Tanger	Casablanca
: UTC				Stadium: Stade Mohammed V

2026 15	IR Tanger	v	DH Jadida	Tangier
: UTC				Stadium: Tangier Grand Stadium

2026 16	IR Tanger	v	USA Tiznit	Tangier
: UTC				Stadium: Tangier Grand Stadium

2026 17	MA Tétouan	v	IR Tanger	Tétouan
: UTC				Stadium: Saniat Rmel Stadium

2026 18	IR Tanger	v	KAC Marrakech	Tangier
: UTC				Stadium: Tangier Grand Stadium

2026 19	MAS Fes	v	IR Tanger	Fez
: UTC				Stadium: Fez Stadium

2026 20	IR Tanger	v	AS FAR	Tangier
: UTC				Stadium: Tangier Grand Stadium

2026 21	RCA Zemamra	v	IR Tanger	Zemamra
: UTC				Stadium: Ahmed Choukri Stadium

2026 22	IR Tanger	v	Raja CA	Tangier
: UTC				Stadium: Tangier Grand Stadium

2026 23	HUS Agadir	v	IR Tanger	Agadir
: UTC				Stadium: Adrar Stadium

2026 24	IR Tanger	v	Fath US	Tangier
: UTC				Stadium: Tangier Grand Stadium

2026 25	RS Berkane	v	IR Tanger	Berkane
: UTC				Stadium: Berkane Municipal Stadium

2026 26	US Touarga	v	IR Tanger	Rabat
: UTC				Stadium: Moulay Hassan Stadium

2026 27	IR Tanger	v	WS Temara	Tangier
: UTC				Stadium: Tangier Grand Stadium

2026 28	COD Meknes	v	IR Tanger	Meknes
: UTC				Stadium: Meknes Honor Stadium

2026 29	IR Tanger	v	Wydad AC	Tangier
: UTC				Stadium: Tangier Grand Stadium

2026 30	DH Jadidi	v	IR Tanger	El Jadida
: UTC				Stadium: Ben M'Hamed El Abdi Stadium

==== Results overview ====
Locations of the 2026–27 Botola teams

Win Draw Loss

Region	Team	Home score	Away score	Aggregate score
Casablanca-Settat	DH el Jadidi	–	–	–
Casablanca-Settat	Raja CA	–	2–0	–
Casablanca-Settat	RCA Zemamra	1–0	–	–
Casablanca-Settat	Wydad AC	–	–	–
Rabat-Salé-Kénitra	AS FAR	–	2–0	–
Rabat-Salé-Kénitra	Fath US	–	–	–
Rabat-Salé-Kénitra	US Touarga	–	–	–
Rabat-Salé-Kénitra	WS Témara	–	–	–
Fès-Meknès	COD Meknès	–	–	–
Fès-Meknès	MAS Fez	2–1	–	–
Souss-Massa	HUS Agadir	–	–	–
Souss-Massa	USA Tiznit	–	1–3	–
Tangier-Tétouan-Al Hoceima	MA Tétouan	1–1	–	–
Marrakesh-Safi	KAC Marrakech	–	2–1	–
Oriental	RS Berkane	–	–	–

=== Throne Cup ===
2026 Round of 16	IR Tanger	v	RS Berkane	Tangier
: UTC+1				Stadium: Tangier Grand Stadium

== Statistics ==
=== Squad appearances and goals ===
Last updated on 8 November 2026.

No.	Pos	Nat	Player	Total		Botola		Throne Cup	
No.	Pos	Nat	Player	Apps	Goals	Apps	Goals	Apps	Goals
Goalkeepers
12	GK	(Togo) TOG	Malcolm Barcola	2	-3	2	(-3)	0	(0)
13	GK	(Morocco) MAR	Aymane Douieb	0	0	0	(0)	0	(0)
25	GK	(Morocco) MAR	Ahmed Azmi	0	0	0	(0)	0	(0)
61	GK	(Morocco) MAR	Badreddine Abyir	5	-6	5	(-6)	0	(0)
Defenders
2	DF	(Morocco) MAR	Reda El Meliani	0	0	0	0	0	0
4	DF	(Morocco) MAR	Mohamed Saoud	4	1	4	1	0	0
6	DF	(Morocco) MAR	Bilal El Ouadghiri	7	0	7	0	0	0
15	DF	(Morocco) MAR	Achraf Laâziri	7	0	7	0	0	0
22	DF	(Morocco) MAR	Zakaria Kiani	7	0	7	0	0	0
23	DF	(Morocco) MAR	Anass Lamrabat	1	0	0+1	0	0	0
24	DF	(Morocco) MAR	Akram El Wahabi	6	0	3+3	0	0	0
27	DF	(Morocco) MAR	Saad Ait Khorsa	5	1	4+1	1	0	0
98	DF	(Morocco) MAR	Yassine Karmadi	0	0	0	0	0	0
Midfielders
8	MF	(Botswana) BOT	Gape Mohutsiwa	4	0	4	0	0	0
10	MF	(Morocco) MAR	Mohamed El Arouch	7	0	4+3	0	0	0
18	MF	(Morocco) MAR	Soufyan Ahannach	7	0	4+3	0	0	0
20	MF	(Morocco) MAR	Ennama El Bellali	5	0	3+2	0	0	0
21	MF	(Morocco) MAR	Hamza Moudene	4	1	0+4	1	0	0
29	MF	(Senegal) SEN	Babacar Sarr	5	0	5	0	0	0
34	MF	(Morocco) MAR	Mohammed El Guartit	0	0	0	0	0	0
48	MF	(Morocco) MAR	Achraf El Quaraoui	0	0	0	0	0	0
Forwards
7	FW	(Morocco) MAR	Younes Najari	6	2	5+1	2	0	0
16	DF	(Morocco) MAR	Akram Tali	2	0	0+2	0	0	0
17	MF	(Morocco) MAR	Abdelhamid Maâli	6	1	4+2	1	0	0
31	FW	(Senegal) SEN	Ibrahima Dieng	7	2	7	2	0	0
67	FW	(Morocco) MAR	Haytham Bakhlakh	1	0	0+1	0	0	0
77	FW	(Morocco) MAR	Ousama Siddiki	3	0	0+3	0	0	0
99	FW	(Germany) GER	Senad Jarović	5	0	1+4	0	0	0
Players who have made an appearance or had a squad number this season but have left the club

=== Goalscorers ===
Rank	No.	Pos	Nat	Name	Botola	Throne Cup	Total
1	7	FW	(Morocco)	Younes Najari	2	0	2
1	31	FW	(Senegal)	Ibrahima Dieng	2	0	2
3	27	DF	(Morocco)	Saad Ait Khorsa	1	0	1
3	17	FW	(Morocco)	Abdelhamid Maâli	1	0	1
3	4	DF	(Morocco)	Mohamed Saoud	1	0	1
3	21	MF	(Morocco)	Hamza Moudene	1	0	1
TOTAL					8	0	8

=== Assists ===
Rank	No.	Pos	Nat	Name	Botola	Throne Cup	Total
1	7	FW	(Morocco)	Younes Najari	2	0	2
2	17	FW	(Morocco)	Abdelhamid Maâli	1	0	1
2	18	MF	(Morocco)	Soufyan Ahannach	1	0	1
2	8	MF	(Botswana)	Gape Mohutsiwa	1	0	1
2	31	FW	(Senegal)	Ibrahima Dieng	1	0	1
TOTAL					6	0	6

=== Clean sheets ===
Last updated on 8 November 2026.

No	Name	Botola	Coupe du Trône	Total
12	(Togo) Barcola	0/2	0/0	0/2
13	(Morocco) Douieb	0/0	0/0	0/0
25	(Morocco) Azmi	0/0	0/0	0/0
61	(Morocco) Abyir	1/5	0/0	1/5
Total		1/7	0/0	1/7

=== Disciplinary record ===
N	P	Nat.	Name	Botola			Coupe du Trône			Total			Notes
N	P	Nat.	Name	Yellow card	Second yellow card	Red card	Yellow card	Second yellow card	Red card	Yellow card	Second yellow card	Red card	Notes
4	DF	(Morocco)	Mohamed Saoud	1						1			
6	DF	(Morocco)	Bilal El Ouadghiri	2						2			
8	MF	(Botswana)	Gape Mohutsiwa	1		1				1		1	
15	DF	(Morocco)	Achraf Laâziri	3						3			
17	FW	(Morocco)	Abdelhamid Maâli	1						1			
20	MF	(Morocco)	Ennama El Bellali	1						1			
21	MF	(Morocco)	Hamza Moudene	1						1			
24	DF	(Morocco)	Akram El Wahabi	1						1			
29	MF	(Senegal)	Babacar Sarr	2						2			
61	GK	(Morocco)	Badreddine Abyir	1						1			

Last updated: 8 November 2026
Source: soccerway.com
Only competitive matches
(yellow card) = Number of bookings; (second yellow card) = Number of sending offs after a second yellow card; (red card) = Number of sending offs by a direct red card.

=== Injury record ===
N	P	Nat.	Name	Type	Status	Source	Match	Inj. Date	Ret. Date
21	MF	(Morocco)	Hamza Moudene	Adductor muscles injury			in training	14 August 2026	2 October 2026
48	MF	(Morocco)	Achraf El Quaraoui	Adductor muscles injury			in training	14 August 2026	14 October 2026
77	FW	(Morocco)	Ousama Siddiki	hamstring injury			vs MA Tétouan	2 October 2026	28 October 2026
29	MF	(Senegal)	Babacar Sarr	Adductor muscles injury — right thigh			vs KAC Marrakech	10 October 2026	28 October 2026
4	MF	(Morocco)	Mohamed Saoud	Sprain — left ankle			vs Maghreb Fez	14 October 2026	
7	FW	(Morocco)	Younes Najari	Rectus femoris muscle aponeurosis partial tear — right thigh			in training	1 November 2026	8 November 2026
61	GK	(Morocco)	Badreddine Abyir	Posterior muscles contraction — left thigh			vs RCA Zemamra	1 November 2026	8 November 2026

- Player is injured
- Player has recovered from injury
Last updated: 8 November 2026
Source: irtfoot.ma

== See also ==
- 2015–16 IR Tanger season
- 2016–17 IR Tanger season
- 2017–18 IR Tanger season
- 2018–19 IR Tanger season
- 2019–20 IR Tanger season
- 2020–21 IR Tanger season
- 2021–22 IR Tanger season
- 2022–23 IR Tanger season
- 2023–24 IR Tanger season
- 2024–25 IR Tanger season
- 2025–26 IR Tanger season
