= 2025–26 IR Tanger season =

Ittihad Tanger
2025–26 season
- President: Nassrallah El Guartit
- Manager: Hilal Et-tair (until 18 November); Pepe Mel (from 2 December; until 10 March); Abdelhak Benchikha (from 11 March)
- Stadium: Sports Village (5 matches); Tangier Grand Stadium
- Botola Pro: 7th
- Throne Cup: Round of 16
- Top goalscorer: League: El Bahja (8 goals); All: El Bahja (8 goals)
- Biggest win: Home: IR Tanger 1–0 RS Berkane; IR Tanger 2–1 Wydad AC; IR Tanger 2–1 US Yacoub El Mansour; IR Tanger 1–0 RCA Zemamra; IR Tanger 2–1 COD Meknes; Away: KAC Marrakech 0–2 IR Tanger
- Biggest defeat: Home: IR Tanger 0–3 Fath US; Away: Olympique Dcheira 2–0 IR Tanger
Home colours	Away colours
- All statistics correct as of 5 July 2026.

The 2025–26 season is Ittihad Riadi Tanger's 43nd season in existence and the club's 27th in the top flight of Moroccan football, and eleventh consecutive.

== Kit ==
- Supplier: Joma
- Club Sponsor: Tanger-Med (front)
- League Sponsor: Inwi (sleeves)

Home	Away	Home (new)	Away (new)

== Squad ==
As of match played 5 July 2026

No.	Name	Nationality	Position	Date of birth (age)	Signed from	Signed in	Contract ends	Apps.	Goals
Goalkeepers
1	Amine El Ouaad	(Morocco)	GK	8 December 1995 (age 30)	Free agent	2025		43	(-46)
12	Malcolm Barcola	(Togo) (France)	GK	14 May 1999 (age 27)	FC Paços de Ferreira	2025		1	(-1)
25	Ahmed Azmi	(Morocco) (Netherlands)	GK	3 September 2002 (age 24)	Jong FC Utrecht	2026		0	(0)
73	Youssef Laghzal	(Morocco)	GK	1 January 2001 (age 25)	WA Fès	2023	2026	10	(-12)
Defenders
4	Mohamed Saoud (captain)	(Morocco)	DF	30 January 1996 (age 30)	MA Tetouan	2023	2027	63	6
6	Bilal El Ouadghiri	(Morocco)	DF	3 August 2001 (age 25)	Free agent	2025	2027	38	6
13	Oussama Al Aiz	(Morocco)	DF	26 January 2001 (age 25)	Academy	2020	2026	68	0
22	Zakaria Kiani	(Morocco)	RB	22 January 1997 (age 29)	CAY Berrechid	2022	2026	101	3
23	Anass Lamrabat	(Morocco)	DF	13 July 1993 (age 33)	MA Tétouan	2023	2026	68	0
24	Akram El Wahabi	(Spain) (Morocco)	DF	7 January 2004 (age 22)	Academy	2024		16	0
36	Saad Karouat	(Morocco)	DF	19 January 2008 (age 18)	Academy	2026		0	0
49	Louay El Moussaoui	(Morocco)	DF	20 March 2004 (age 22)	Academy	2024		11	0
97	Badr Gaddarine	(Morocco)	DF	20 October 1997 (age 28)	Free agent	2025	2026	33	0
Midfielders
8	Abdelmottalib Faouzi (3rd captain)	(Morocco)	MF	19 July 1993 (age 33)	CR Bernoussi	2019	2026	139	9
10	Mohamed El Arouch	(France) (Morocco)	MF	6 April 2004 (age 22)	RWDM Brussels	2026		18	1
16	Ahmed Chentouf (vice-captain)	(Morocco)	MF	5 December 1996 (age 29)	HUS Agadir (A)	2023 (2)	2026	142	6
17	Abdelhamid Maâli	(Morocco)	MF	16 March 2006 (age 20)	Academy	2026 (2)		66	0
20	Ennama El Bellali	(Morocco)	MF	17 February 1998 (age 28)	JS Soualem	2025	2028	33	0
21	Hamza Moudene	(Morocco)	MF	9 December 1995 (age 30)	RCA Zemamra	2025	2027	28	0
29	Adam Darazi	(France) (Morocco)	MF	24 January 2005 (age 21)	Stade Beaucairois FC	2025		12	0
79	Siriki Sanogo	(Ivory Coast)	MF	13 December 2001 (age 24)	Free agent	2025	2026	26	1
Forwards
9	Dylan Saint-Louis	(Republic of the Congo) (France)	FW	26 April 1995 (age 31)	Free agent	2026		1	0
14	Haitam El Bahja	(Morocco)	FW	23 December 1993 (age 32)	JS Soualem	2025	2026	41	12
19	Jawad Rhabra	(Morocco)	FW	11 September 1994 (age 32)	RCA Zemamra	2022	2026	71	11
28	Karim Lagrouch	(Morocco)	FW	29 June 2000 (age 26)	JS Soualem	2026		17	3
38	Livty Kpolo	(France) (Ivory Coast)	FW	17 May 2002 (age 24)	Grenoble Foot 38 B	2025		24	0
61	Akram Tali	(Morocco)	DF	21 May 2007 (age 19)	Academy	2026		4	0
72	Papa Magueye Gaye	(Senegal)	FW	15 May 2006 (age 20)	AF Darou Salam	2025		21	2
75	Moussa Koté	(Senegal)	FW	12 April 2006 (age 20)	Dial Diop SC	2025		5	0
99	Zakaria Bakkali	(Belgium) (Morocco)	FW	26 January 1996 (age 30)	Free agent	2025	2026	22	1
Players who have left the club during the season
5	Mohsine Moutaouali (captain)	(Morocco)	MF	3 March 1986 (age 40)	Free agent	2025 (2)	2026	41	9

- (A) = originally from the academy

=== From youth squad ===
No.	Name	Nationality	Position	Date of birth (age)	Signed from	Signed in	Contract ends	Apps.	Goals
26	Yassine Hachloufi	(Morocco)	GK	20 April 2006 (age 20)	Academy	2024		0	(0)
27	Solaymane Ait Dani	(Morocco)	FW	27 February 2005 (age 21)	Academy	2024		2	0
33	Mohamed Salhi	(Morocco)	DF	2 June 2009 (age 17)	Academy	2026		0	0
34	Mohammed El Guartit	(Morocco)	MF	1 January 2005 (age 21)	Academy	2025		1	0
48	Achraf El Quaraoui	(Morocco)	MF	27 October 2006 (age 19)	Academy	2024		5	0
64	Nawfal Chninak	(Morocco) (France)	FW	30 June 2006 (age 20)	Montpellier HSC U19	2025	2028	3	0
67	Haytham Bakhlakh	(England) (Morocco)	FW	25 June 2006 (age 20)	FC Clacton	2025		3	1

== Transfers ==
=== In ===
No.	Pos	Player	Transferred from	Fee	Date	Source
12	GK	(Togo) Malcolm Barcola	(Portugal) FC Paços de Ferreira	Free Transfer	27 August 2025	
72	FW	(Senegal) Papa Magueye Gaye	(Senegal) AF Darou Salam		27 August 2025	
17	MF	(Morocco) Abdelhamid Maâli	(Egypt) Zamalek SC	Free Transfer	24 December 2025	
28	FW	(Morocco) Karim Lagrouch	JS Soualem		24 January 2026	
10	MF	(France) Mohamed El Arouch	(Belgium) RWDM Brussels	Free Transfer	24 January 2026	
9	FW	(Republic of the Congo) Dylan Saint-Louis	Free agent (Note: Most recently played for Sakaryaspor)	Free Transfer	24 January 2026	
25	GK	(Morocco) Ahmed Azmi	(Netherlands) Jong FC Utrecht	Free Transfer	24 January 2026	

=== Contract renewals ===
No.	Pos.	Nationality	Name	Date	Until	Source
8	MF	(Morocco)	Abdelmottalib Faouzi	30 June 2025		
16	MF	(Morocco)	Ahmed Chentouf	30 June 2025		
14	FW	(Morocco)	Haitam El Bahja	30 June 2025		
5	MF	(Morocco)	Mohsine Moutaouali	30 June 2025		
19	FW	(Morocco)	Jawad Rhabra	30 June 2025		
23	DF	(Morocco)	Anass Lamrabat	30 June 2025		

=== Out ===
No.	Pos	Player	Transferred to	Fee	Date	Source
2	DF	(Morocco) Youssef Chaina	R Beni Mellal	Free Transfer	23 May 2025	
6	MF	(Morocco) Nouaman Aarab	CA Khenifra	Free Transfer	23 May 2025	
31	DF	(Algeria) Walid Bencherifa	(Algeria) Olympique Akbou	Contract termination	19 June 2025	
18	FW	(Morocco) Hamza El Wasti	Wydad AC	Free Transfer	10 July 2025	
30	FW	(Morocco) Ali El Harrak	Fath US	Free Transfer	25 July 2025	
17	FW	(Morocco) Abdelhamid Maâli	(Egypt) Zamalek SC	€428.000	27 July 2025	
12	GK	(Morocco) Rayan Azouagh	(Spain) Sevilla FC	€91.000	13 August 2025	
33	MF	(Morocco) Salaheddine Cheffani	(Bahrain) Um Al-Hassam Club	Free Transfer	14 August 2025	
35	MF	(Morocco) Mohammed Moujahid	IZ Khemisset	Free Transfer	1 September 2025	
15	DF	(Morocco) Ayoub Jarfi				
5	MF	(Morocco) Mohsine Moutaouali	RCA Zemamra		23 January 2026	

== Technical staff ==
Position	Name
First team head coach	(Morocco) Hilal Et-tair
Assistant coach	(France) Serge Romano
Assistant coach	(Morocco) Abdelouahed Benkacem
Fitness coach	(Morocco) Rachid Blej
Goalkeeping coach	(Morocco) Mohammed Bestara
Performance analyst	(Morocco) Ahmed Zekhnini

until 18 November 2025.

Position	Name
First team head coach	(Spain) Pepe Mel
Assistant coach	(Spain) Nacho Pérez
Fitness coach	(Spain) Adolfo Mayordomo
Fitness coach	(Morocco) Rachid Blej
Goalkeeping coach	(Morocco) Mohammed Bestara
Video analyst	(France) Antoine Giacomoni

until 10 March 2026.

Position	Name
First team head coach	(Algeria) Abdelhak Benchikha
Assistant coach	(France) Serge Romano
Fitness coach	(Morocco) Mouchriq Abdelhakim
Sports Psychologist	(Morocco) Ali Ataoui
Club doctor	(Morocco) Marouan Afkir
Sports Nurse	(Morocco) Abdelmonhem Nafie
Sports Masseur	(Morocco) Mohamed Didi
Physiotherapist	(Morocco) Saber Khamal
Hope's team coach	(France) David Vandenbossche
Hope's team assistant coach	(Morocco) Ahmed Salah
Hope's Team Fitness coach	(Morocco) Hamza Raiss El Fenni
General sports manager	(Spain) Pepe Mel

== Pre-season and friendlies ==
18 July 2025 1	Córdoba CF (Spain)	2–1	IR Tanger	Pozoblanco, Spain
20:00 UTC+1	Jacobo 6'; Kevin 85' (pen.)	Report	Lamrabat 57'	Stadium: Estadio Nuestra Señora de Luna

29 August 2025 2	IR Tanger	0–0	CA Khenifra	Tangier
17:30 UTC+1		Report		Stadium: Ziaten Training Stadium

6 September 2025 3	Wydad AC	0–0	IR Tanger	Casablanca
17:00 UTC+1		Report		Stadium: Père Jégo Stadium

19 December 2025 4	IR Tanger	7–1	CA Tanger	Tangier
--:-- UTC+1				Stadium: Ziaten Training Stadium

2 January 2026 5	IR Tanger	0–1	Wydad AC	Tangier
10:30 UTC+1			Walid Nassi	Stadium: Ziaten Training Stadium

10 January 2026 6	Racing AC	2–2	IR Tanger	Casablanca
15:00 UTC+1		Report	Rhabra	Stadium: Père Jégo Stadium

11 January 2026 7	IR Tanger	3–0	CS Fnideq	Tangier
15:00 UTC+1	Kpolo; Koté; Bakkali	Report		Stadium: Annexe Ibn Batouta Sdadium

16 January 2026 8	Raja CA	2–1	IR Tanger	Casablanca
10:30 UTC+1	Oyewusi; Sharara		Koté; Saoud (penalty missed)	Stadium: Academy Raja Club Athletic

18 March 2026 9	IR Tanger	1–1	US Touarga	Tangier
22:00 UTC+1	El Ouadghiri		Goal	Stadium: Village Sdadium

4 April 2026 10	US Touarga	2–1	IR Tanger	Rabat
12:00 UTC+1	Goal		Gaddarine	Stadium: Academy UTS Stadium

11 April 2026 11	IR Tanger	4–0	Kenitra AC	Tangier
16:00 UTC+1	Moudene; El Bahja; Chentouf; Saint-Louis			Stadium: Village Sdadium

18 April 2026 12	IR Tanger	2–0	MA Tetouan	Tangier
16:00 UTC+1	Rhabra; El Bahja	Report		Stadium: Village Sdadium

=== Ibn Battuta Cup ===
25 July 2025 1	IR Tanger	1–2	US Yacoub El Mansour	Tanger, Morocco
18:00 UTC+1	Moudene 90'	Report	Balouk; Kharjan	Stadium: Training Annex Stadium

28 July 2025 2	IR Tanger	4–1	Kénitra AC	Tanger, Morocco
21:00 UTC+1	Ait Dani 30'; Kpolo; El Moussaoui; El Bahja	Report	Goal	Stadium: Al Qaria Riyadiyah Stadium

31 July 2025 3	IR Tanger	3–1	KAC Marrakech	Tanger, Morocco
21:00 UTC+1	El Bahja; Saoud	Report	Goal	Stadium: Al Qaria Riyadiyah Stadium

Pos	Team	Pld	W	D	L	GF	GA	GD	Pts	Result	IRT	KACM	USYM	KAC
1	IR Tanger	3	2	0	1	8	4	+4	6	Winners	—	3–1	1–2	4–1
2	KAC Marrakech	3	1	1	1	6	5	+1	4	Runners-up	-	—	4–1	1–1
3	US Yacoub El Mansour	3	1	1	1	3	5	−2	4		-	-	—	0–0
4	Kénitra AC	3	0	2	1	2	5	−3	2		-	-	-	—

Updated to match(es) played on 31 July 2025. Source: clubIRT
Rules for classification: 1) Points; 2) Goal difference; 3) Goals scored.

=== Rabat Tournament ===
11 August 2025 1	COD Meknès	1–1	IR Tanger	Rabat, Morocco
18:30 UTC+1	Goal	Report	Moutaouali

13 August 2025 2	US Touarga	0–0	IR Tanger	Rabat, Morocco
18:30 UTC+1		Report

15 August 2025 3	Fath US	3–1	IR Tanger	Rabat, Morocco
18:30 UTC+1	Goal	Report	Lamrabat

Pos	Team	Pld	W	D	L	GF	GA	GD	Pts	Result	FUS	CODM	IRT	UST
1	Fath US	3	3	0	0	7	2	+5	9	Winners	—	2–1	3–1	2–0
2	COD Meknes	3	1	1	1	3	3	0	4	Runners-up	-	—	1–1	1–0
3	IR Tanger	3	0	2	1	2	4	−2	2		-	-	—	0–0
4	US Touarga	3	0	1	2	0	3	−3	1		-	-	-	—

Updated to match(es) played on 15 August 2025. Source: clubIRT
Rules for classification: 1) Points; 2) Goal difference; 3) Goals scored.

== Competitions ==
Win Draw Loss

=== Overview ===
Competition	First match	Last match	Starting round	Final position	Record							
Competition	First match	Last match	Starting round	Final position	Pld	W	D	L	GF	GA	GD	Win %
Botola Pro	12 September 2025	5 July 2026	Matchday 1	7th	30	9	12	9	27	31	−4	30.00
Throne Cup	17 May 2026	2026	Round of 32		1	1	0	0	2	1	+1	100.00
Total					31	10	12	9	29	32	−3	32.26

Last updated: 5 July 2026.
Source: Competitions

=== Botola Pro ===
==== Standings ====
Pos	Team	Pld	W	D	L	GF	GA	GD	Pts
5	Wydad AC	30	13	4	13	39	33	+6	43
6	DH El Jadida	30	9	13	8	30	34	−4	40
7	Ittihad Tanger	30	9	12	9	27	31	−4	39
8	FUS Rabat	30	9	10	11	31	36	−5	37
9	Kawkab Marrakech	30	8	12	10	27	26	+1	36 (Note: Head-to-head Goal Difference: KACM +2, CODM -2)

Updated to match(es) played on 21 July 2026. Source: FRMF
Rules for classification: 1) Points; 2a) Head-to-head goal difference if they are two teams with equal points; 2b) Goal difference if they are more than two teams with equal points; 3) Number of wins; 4) Goals scored; 5) Play-off between involved teams if necessary.
Source: FRMF Competitions ruleset: Article 54.2

==== Results summary ====
Overall								Home						Away					
Pld	W	D	L	GF	GA	GD	Pts	W	D	L	GF	GA	GD	W	D	L	GF	GA	GD
30	9	12	9	27	31	−4	39	5	8	2	15	14	+1	4	4	7	12	17	−5

Last updated: 5 July 2026.
Source: flashscore.com

==== Results by round ====
Round	1	2	3	4	5	6	7	8	9	10	11	12	13	14	15	16	17	18	19	20	21	22	23	24	25	26	27	28	29	30
Ground	H	H	A	H	A	H	A	H	A	H	A	H	A	H	A	A	A	H	A	H	A	H	A	H	A	H	A	H	A	H
Result	D	D	D	L	D	D	L	W	W	D	L	L	L	D	L	D	W	D	D	D	W	W	L	W	W	W	L	D	L	W
Position	6	7	9	12	13	11	14	9	9	8	10	12	13	13	13	13	10	12	12	11	10	10	10	10	7	6	7	8	8	7

Updated to match(es) played on 7 July 2026. Source: Results
A = Away; H = Home; W = Win; D = Draw; L = Loss

==== Matches ====
12 September 2025 1	IR Tanger	1–1	HUS Agadir	Tangier
16:00 UTC+1	El Ouadghiri (yellow card) 8'; Moutaouali 45+9' (pen.); El Bahja (yellow card) 63'; Rhabra (yellow card) 67'	Report	El Amrani (yellow card) 29'; Bello Ilou 45+5'; Abyir (yellow card) 90+1'; Tachtach (yellow card) 90+3'	Stadium: Sports Village Stadium; Attendance: 2,161; Referee: Amin El Maataoui

15 September 2025 2	IR Tanger	1–1	OC Safi	Tangier
17:00 UTC+1	El Bellali (yellow card) 33' (yellow-red card) 50'; El Ouadghiri (red card) 42'; Et-tair (coach) (yellow card) 64'; El Ouaad (red card) 79'; Saoud 84'	Report	Kordani (yellow card) 6' (yellow-red card) 29'; Koné 70'	Stadium: Sports Village Stadium; Attendance: 1,774; Referee: Abderrahim Arrakhiz

1 October 2025 3	AS FAR	1–1	IR Tanger	Rabat
18:00 UTC+1	Derrag (yellow card) 8'; Hrimat 55'; Louadni (yellow card) 75'	Report	El Bahja 2'; Lamrabat (yellow card) 33'; Faouzi (yellow card) 90+5'	Stadium: Olympic Stadium; Referee: Azzeddine Boulfaid

4 October 2025 4	IR Tanger	0–3	Fath US	Tangier
18:00 UTC+1	Lamrabat (yellow card) 30'; Sanogo (red card) 34'; El Ouaad (red card) 54'; Faouzi (yellow card) 61'; Rhabra (yellow card) 83'	Report	Farhane (yellow card) 14'; Souane 42'; El Mahssani (yellow card) 60'; Benyachou 74'; El Harrak 82'	Stadium: Sports Village Stadium; Referee: Mustapha Kechchaf

19 October 2025 5	DH El Jadidi	2–2	IR Tanger	Mohammedia
18:00 UTC+1	Baba 31'; Michte (yellow card) 36'; Fatine (yellow card) 63'; Ziani 73'	Report	El Bellali (yellow card) 35'; El Bahja 55'; El Ouadghiri 68'	Stadium: El Bachir Stadium; Referee: Hamza El Fariq

25 October 2025 6	IR Tanger	1–1	Maghreb AS	Tangier
16:00 UTC+1	Faouzi (yellow card) 32'; Rhabra (yellow card) 45+3'; Moutaouali (penalty missed) 61'; Saoud 90+3' (pen.)	Report	Brika (yellow card) 16'; El Jabali (red card) 27'; Benjdida 53'	Stadium: Sports Village Stadium; Referee: Youness Laoudini

2 November 2025 7	Wydad AC	2–0	IR Tanger	Casablanca
20:00 UTC+1	Hannouri 7'; Lamirat (yellow card) 36'; Nassi 40'; Ferreira (yellow card) 44' (yellow-red card) 85'; Aboulfath (yellow card) 45+1'; Bouchouari (yellow card) 90+7'	Report	El Bahja (yellow card) 45+1'; Gaye (yellow card) 65'	Stadium: Stade Mohammed V Referee: Mohamed Lahouidri

9 November 2025 8	IR Tanger	1–0	RS Berkane	Tangier
18:00 UTC+1	Bakkali (yellow card) 42'; El Bahja (yellow card) 49'; Lamrabat (red card) 58'; Gaye 74'	Report		Stadium: Sports Village Stadium; Referee: Mohamed Zouhair Jamlaoui

24 January 2026 9	US Yacoub El Mansour	1–2	IR Tanger	Rabat
20:00 UTC+1	Azzoubairi (red card) 41'; Balouk 53' (pen.); Jabroun (yellow card) 84'; Sayad (yellow card) 90+11'	Report	El Ouadghiri 20' (yellow card) 90+10'; Chentouf (yellow card) 90+4'; Lagrouch 90+8'; El Arouch (yellow card) 90+9'	Stadium: Al Medina Stadium; Referee: Naoufal Nachite

1 February 2026 10	IR Tanger	0–0	KAC Marrakech	Tangier
20:00 UTC+1	El Moussaoui (yellow card) 9'; El Ouadghiri (yellow card) 33'	Report	Smaali (yellow card) 26'; Hafari (yellow card) 37'; Fassoukh (red card) 69'	Stadium: Tangier Grand Stadium; Referee: Jalal Jayed

8 February 2026 11	RCA Zemamra	1–0	IR Tanger	Zemamra
16:00 UTC+1	Lahtimi 37' (pen.); Tine (yellow card) 45+2'; Farah (yellow card) 61'; Oujeddou (yellow card) 66'; Madkour (yellow card) 79'; Balich (yellow card) 84'; Fakhr (yellow card) 90+5'	Report	El Arouch (yellow card) 23'; Al Aiz (yellow card) 26' (bench)	Stadium: Ahmed Choukri Stadium; Referee: Mohssine Sourdy

14 February 2026 12	IR Tanger	1–2	Olympique Dcheira	Tangier
16:00 UTC+1	Lagrouch 54'; El Arouch (yellow card) 67'; Saoud (yellow card) 73'; Gaddarine (yellow card) 83'	Report	Bennadi 52'; Idar (yellow card) 60'; Aboujemaa (yellow card) 73'; El Gouj (yellow card) 75'; Abardy 79' (yellow card) 90+4'; Oubidar (yellow card) 86'; Khafi (yellow card) 90'	Stadium: Tangier Grand Stadium; Referee: Abdelmounaim Baslam

22 February 2026 13	Raja CA	2–0	IR Tanger	Casablanca
22:00 UTC+1	Khafifi 23'; Iguiz 90+6'	Report	El Ouadghiri (red card) 31'; El Moussaoui (yellow card) 37'; Saoud (yellow card) 42'; Chentouf (yellow card) 90+8'	Stadium: Stade Mohammed V Referee: Naoufal Nachite

28 February 2026 14	IR Tanger	1–1	US Touarga	Tangier
22:00 UTC+1	Rhabra 24'; Maâli (yellow card) 41'; Moudene (yellow card) 73'; Saoud (yellow card) 85'	Report	Rhailouf (yellow card) 33'; Zahouani (yellow card) 55'; Bammou 62'; Ashabi (yellow card) 86'; Essahel (yellow card) 87'	Stadium: Tangier Grand Stadium; Referee: Amine El Maataoui

6 March 2026 15	COD Meknès	1–0	IR Tanger	Meknes
22:00 UTC+1	Bounaga (red card) 26'; Naji 58'; Taher (yellow card) 65'; Benktib (yellow card) 82'; Zinaf (yellow card) 88'	Report	Moudene (yellow card) 42'; El Moussaoui (yellow card) 46'; El Bahja (penalty missed) 84'; Chentouf (yellow card) 90+8'	Stadium: Honneur Stadium; Referee: Mustapha Kechchaf

25 April 2026 16	HUS Agadir	1–1	IR Tanger	Agadir
16:00 UTC+1	Bello Ilou 31'; Arbidi (yellow card) 47'; Ahadad (yellow card) 58'; Qassaq (yellow card) 59'; Sahnoune (yellow card) 90+2'	Report	Lamrabat (yellow card) 67'; El Bahja 77'	Stadium: Adrar Stadium; Referee: Mohamed Jamlaoui

29 April 2026 17	OC Safi	1–2	IR Tanger	Safi
18:00 UTC+1	Morsli (yellow card) 24'; El Motie (yellow card) 38'; Najari (yellow card) 38' (goal) 45+1'; Khannouss (yellow card) 41'; Atik (yellow card) 90+1'	Report	El Arouch (yellow card) 38'; Maâli (yellow card) 90+1'; Gaye 90+7' (yellow card) 90+11'; Lagrouch 90+9'	Stadium: El Massira Stadium; Referee: Essaadi El Hanafi

3 May 2026 18	IR Tanger	0–0	AS FAR	Tangier
21:00 UTC+1	Faouzi (yellow card) 56'; Lagrouch (yellow card) 60'; Kiani (yellow card) 87'	Report	Bouriga (yellow card) 29'; Ech-Chamakh (yellow card) 81'	Stadium: Tangier Grand Stadium; Referee: Nabil Benrkia

6 May 2026 19	Fath US	1–1	IR Tanger	Rabat
17:00 UTC+1	Amhih (yellow card) 15'; Cofi (yellow card) 37'; Benyachou 87'	Report	Rhabra (yellow card) 2'; Kiani 16'; Lamrabat (yellow card) 25'; Gaye (yellow card) 53'	Stadium: Moulay Hassan Stadium; Referee: Mustapha Kechaf

10 May 2026 20	IR Tanger	1–1	DH El Jadidi	Tangier
17:00 UTC+1	Faouzi 31'; Benchikha (coach) (yellow card) 35'	Report	Ennakouss 18'; Bentarcha (yellow card) 45'	Stadium: Tangier Grand Stadium; Referee: Moncef Zine Alaoui

22 May 2026 21	Maghreb AS	0–1	IR Tanger	Fez
19:00 UTC+1	Hamadi (yellow card) 48'; Afsal (yellow card) 84'; Noureddine (yellow card) 84'	Report	El Bahja 52' (yellow card) 88'; Rhabra (yellow card) 88'; Gaye (yellow card) 90+1'; El Arouch (yellow card) 90+3'	Stadium: Fez Stadium; Referee: Hicham Temsamani

3 June 2026 22	IR Tanger	2–1	Wydad AC	Tangier
19:00 UTC+1	Rhabra (yellow card) 7' (goal) 74'; El Bahja (yellow card) 28'; Lamrabat (yellow card) 44'; El Arouch 90+4'	Report	Boucheta (yellow card) 36'; Moufid 61'; El Moutaraji (yellow card) 84'; Benchrifa (coach) (yellow card) 84'	Stadium: Tangier Grand Stadium; Referee: Said Boujidi

8 June 2026 23	RS Berkane	1–0	IR Tanger	Berkane
19:00 UTC+1	Lamlioui 45+8'; Mehri (yellow card) 58'	Report	Moudene (yellow card) 6'; El Ouadghiri (yellow card) 45+6'	Stadium: Stade Municipal de Berkane; Referee: Naoufal Nachite

14 June 2026 24	IR Tanger	2–1	US Yacoub El Mansour	Tangier
16:00 UTC+1	Lamrabat (yellow card) 45'; El Bahja 45+10' (pen.); Saoud (yellow card) 58'; Rhabra 66'; El Ouaad (yellow card) 90+1'	Report	Azzoubairi (yellow card) 14'; Saoud 26' (o.g.); Morsil (yellow card) 39'; Legnibi (yellow card) 45+8'; El Jabri (coach) (yellow card) 84'; El Bernaoui (bench) (yellow card) 90+9'; Marour (yellow card) 90+9' (red card) 90+9'	Stadium: Tangier Grand Stadium; Referee: Saadi Hanafi

17 June 2026 25	KAC Marrakech	0–2	IR Tanger	Marrakesh
16:00 UTC+1	Smaali (yellow card) 36' (yellow-red card) 84'; Jemjami (yellow card) 44'; Mihrab (yellow card) 90+4'	Report	Sanogo 43'; El Wahabi (yellow card) 53'; El Ouaad (yellow card) 56'; El Ouadghiri 63'; Al Aiz (yellow card) 81'; PapaGaye (yellow card) 90+6'	Stadium: Marrakesh Stadium; Referee: Youssef Triki

21 June 2026 26	IR Tanger	1–0	RCA Zemamra	Tangier
15:00 UTC+1	Lamrabat (yellow card) 39'; El Bahja 90+2' (pen.) (yellow card) 90+3'; Faouzi (yellow card) 90+4'	Report	Ajako (yellow card) 81'; Radouani (yellow card) 87'	Stadium: Tangier Grand Stadium; Referee: Mohammed Tounsi

25 June 2026 27	Olympique Dcheira	2–0	IR Tanger	Agadir
18:00 UTC+1	Aboujemaa (yellow card) 30' (yellow-red card) 90+3'; Doumbia 35' (yellow card) 46'; Adjar 42'; Habbali (yellow card) 66'	Report	El Ouadghiri (yellow card) 31'; Moudene (yellow card) 34'; Maâli (yellow card) 72'	Stadium: Adrar Stadium; Referee: Mustapha Kechaf

28 June 2026 28	IR Tanger	1–1	Raja CA	Tangier
18:00 UTC+1	Kiani (yellow card) 38'; Saoud (yellow card) 43'; El Bellali (yellow card) 74'; El Bahja (yellow card) 81'; Lagrouch (yellow card) 90'; El Ouadghiri 90+2'; El Arouch (yellow card) 90+4'	Report	Khafifi 44' (pen.) (yellow card) 78'; Benoun (red card) 67'; Al Makahasi (yellow card) 75'; Ennafati (yellow card) 88'; Alaoui (yellow card) 90+1'	Stadium: Tangier Grand Stadium; Referee: Mohamed Lahouidri

2 July 2026 29	US Touarga	1–0	IR Tanger	Rabat
18:00 UTC+1	Konan (yellow card) 61'; Tebily 83' (yellow card) 90+5'; Bouelainine (yellow card) 90+8'	Report	El Bellali (yellow card) 20'; Ait Dani (red card) 37'	Stadium: Al Medina Stadium; Referee: Youness Laoudini

5 July 2026 30	IR Tanger	2–1	COD Meknès	Tangier
18:00 UTC+1	El Bahja 1', 8'; Barcola (yellow card) 9+4'	Report	Eddib 51'; Hmaidou (yellow card) 85'; Daoui (yellow card) 85'	Stadium: Tangier Grand Stadium; Referee: Redouane Boudlal

==== Results overview ====
Locations of the 2025–26 Botola teams

Win Draw Loss

Region	Team	Home score	Away score	Aggregate score
Casablanca-Settat	DH el Jadidi	1–1	2–2	3–3
Casablanca-Settat	Raja CA	1–1	2–0	1–3
Casablanca-Settat	RCA Zemamra	1–0	1–0	1–1
Casablanca-Settat	Wydad AC	2–1	2–0	2–3
Rabat-Salé-Kénitra	AS FAR	0–0	1–1	1–1
Rabat-Salé-Kénitra	Fath US	0–3	1–1	1–4
Rabat-Salé-Kénitra	US Touarga	1–1	1–0	1–2
Rabat-Salé-Kénitra	US Yacoub El Mansour	2–1	1–2	4–2
Fez-Meknes	COD Meknès	2–1	1–0	2–2
Fez-Meknes	Maghreb AS	1–1	0–1	2–1
Marrakesh-Safi	OC Safi	1–1	1–2	3–2
Marrakesh-Safi	KAC Marrakech	0–0	0–2	2–0
Souss-Massa	HUS Agadir	1–1	1–1	2–2
Souss-Massa	Olympique Dcheira	1–2	2–0	1–4
Oriental	RS Berkane	1–0	1–0	1–1

=== Throne Cup ===
17 May 2026 Round of 32	Kénitra AC	1–2 (a.e.t.)	IR Tanger	Tangier
16:00 UTC+1	(yellow card) (yellow card) (yellow card); El Farssi 90+5'	Report	El Ouadghiri 6' (yellow card) (yellow card); Bakhlakh 119'	Stadium: Tangier Grand Stadium; Referee: Yassine Bourouss

== Statistics ==
=== Squad appearances and goals ===
Last updated on 5 July 2026.

No.	Pos	Nat	Player	Total		Botola		Throne Cup	
No.	Pos	Nat	Player	Apps	Goals	Apps	Goals	Apps	Goals
Goalkeepers
1	GK	(Morocco) MAR	Amine El Ouaad	28	-26	27	(-25)	1	(-1)
12	GK	(Togo) TOG	Malcolm Barcola	1	-1	1	(-1)	0	(0)
25	GK	(Morocco) MAR	Ahmed Azmi	0	0	0	(0)	0	(0)
26	GK	(Morocco) MAR	Yassine Hachloufi	0	0	0	(0)	0	(0)
73	GK	(Morocco) MAR	Youssef Laghzal	4	-5	2+2	(-5)	0	(0)
Defenders
4	DF	(Morocco) MAR	Mohamed Saoud	28	2	28	2	0	0
6	DF	(Morocco) MAR	Bilal El Ouadghiri	24	5	23	4	1	1
13	DF	(Morocco) MAR	Oussama Al Aiz	9	0	2+7	0	0	0
22	DF	(Morocco) MAR	Zakaria Kiani	27	1	25+1	1	1	0
23	DF	(Morocco) MAR	Anass Lamrabat	26	0	21+4	0	1	0
24	DF	(Morocco) MAR	Akram El Wahabi	13	0	8+4	0	1	0
33	DF	(Morocco) MAR	Mohamed Salhi	0	0	0	0	0	0
36	DF	(Morocco) MAR	Saad Karouat	0	0	0	0	0	0
49	DF	(Morocco) MAR	Louay El Moussaoui	9	0	6+3	0	0	0
61	DF	(Morocco) MAR	Akram Tali	4	0	0+4	0	0	0
97	DF	(Morocco) MAR	Badr Gaddarine	27	0	26	0	1	0
Midfielders
8	MF	(Morocco) MAR	Abdelmottalib Faouzi	28	1	18+9	1	1	0
10	MF	(France) FRA	Mohamed El Arouch	18	1	15+2	1	0+1	0
16	MF	(Morocco) MAR	Ahmed Chentouf	11	0	2+9	0	0	0
17	MF	(Morocco) MAR	Abdelhamid Maâli	22	0	13+8	0	1	0
20	MF	(Morocco) MAR	Ennama El Bellali	19	0	14+4	0	1	0
21	MF	(Morocco) MAR	Hamza Moudene	16	0	10+6	0	0	0
29	MF	(Morocco) MAR	Adam Darazi	8	0	1+7	0	0	0
34	MF	(Morocco) MAR	Mohammed El Guartit	0	0	0	0	0	0
48	MF	(Morocco) MAR	Achraf El Quaraoui	5	0	1+4	0	0	0
79	MF	(Ivory Coast) CIV	Siriki Sanogo	24	1	16+7	1	0+1	0
Forwards
9	FW	(Republic of the Congo) CGO	Dylan Saint-Louis	1	0	0+1	0	0	0
14	FW	(Morocco) MAR	Haitam El Bahja	26	8	23+2	8	1	0
19	FW	(Morocco) MAR	Jawad Rhabra	25	3	22+2	3	1	0
27	FW	(Morocco) MAR	Solaymane Ait Dani	1	0	1	0	0	0
28	FW	(Morocco) MAR	Karim Lagrouch	17	3	6+10	3	0+1	0
38	FW	(France) FRA	Livty Kpolo	13	0	1+12	0	0	0
64	FW	(Morocco) MAR	Nawfal Chninak	3	0	0+3	0	0	0
67	FW	(Morocco) MAR	Haytham Bakhlakh	3	1	0+2	0	0+1	1
72	FW	(Senegal) SEN	Papa Magueye Gaye	21	2	10+10	2	0+1	0
75	FW	(Senegal) SEN	Moussa Koté	4	0	1+3	0	0	0
99	FW	(Belgium) BEL	Zakaria Bakkali	8	0	1+7	0	0	0
Players who have made an appearance or had a squad number this season but have left the club
5	MF	(Morocco) MAR	Mohsine Moutaouali	7	1	7	1	0	0

=== Goalscorers ===
Rank	No.	Pos	Nat	Name	Botola	Throne Cup	Total
1	14	FW	(Morocco)	Haitam El Bahja	8	0	8
2	6	DF	(Morocco)	Bilal El Ouadghiri	4	1	5
3	28	FW	(Morocco)	Karim Lagrouch	3	0	3
3	19	FW	(Morocco)	Jawad Rhabra	3	0	3
5	4	DF	(Morocco)	Mohamed Saoud	2	0	2
5	72	FW	(Senegal)	Papa Magueye Gaye	2	0	2
7	5	MF	(Morocco)	Mohsine Moutaouali	1	0	1
7	22	DF	(Morocco)	Zakaria Kiani	1	0	1
7	8	MF	(Morocco)	Abdelmottalib Faouzi	1	0	1
7	10	MF	(France)	Mohamed El Arouch	1	0	1
7	67	FW	(Morocco)	Haytham Bakhlakh	0	1	1
7	79	MF	(Ivory Coast)	Siriki Sanogo	1	0	1
TOTAL					27	2	29

=== Assists ===
Rank	No.	Pos	Nat	Name	Botola	Throne Cup	Total
1	17	MF	(Morocco)	Abdelhamid Maâli	8	0	8
2	23	DF	(Morocco)	Anass Lamrabat	3	0	3
3	19	FW	(Morocco)	Jawad Rhabra	2	0	2
3	97	DF	(Morocco)	Badr Gaddarine	2	0	2
5	5	MF	(Morocco)	Mohsine Moutaouali	1	0	1
5	21	MF	(Morocco)	Hamza Moudene	1	0	1
5	49	DF	(Morocco)	Louay El Moussaoui	1	0	1
5	14	FW	(Morocco)	Haitam El Bahja	1	0	1
5	10	MF	(France)	Mohamed El Arouch	1	0	1
5	8	MF	(Morocco)	Abdelmottalib Faouzi	0	1	1
TOTAL					20	1	21

=== Clean sheets ===
Last updated on 5 July 2026.

No	Name	Botola	Coupe du Trône	Total
1	(Morocco) El Ouaad	6/27	0/1	6/28
12	(Togo) Barcola	0/1	0/0	0/1
25	(Morocco) Azmi	0/0	0/0	0/0
26	(Morocco) Hachloufi	0/0	0/0	0/0
73	(Morocco) Laghzal	1/2+2	0/0	1/2+2
Total		6/30	0/1	6/31

=== Disciplinary record ===
N	P	Nat.	Name	Botola			Coupe du Trône			Total			Notes
N	P	Nat.	Name	Yellow card	Second yellow card	Red card	Yellow card	Second yellow card	Red card	Yellow card	Second yellow card	Red card	Notes
1	GK	(Morocco)	Amine El Ouaad	2		2				2		2	
4	DF	(Morocco)	Mohamed Saoud	5						5			
6	DF	(Morocco)	Bilal El Ouadghiri	5		2				5		2	
8	MF	(Morocco)	Abdelmottalib Faouzi	5						5			
10	MF	(France)	Mohamed El Arouch	5						5			
12	GK	(Togo)	Malcolm Barcola	1						1			
13	DF	(Morocco)	Oussama Al Aiz	2						2			
14	FW	(Morocco)	Haitam El Bahja	7						7			
16	MF	(Morocco)	Ahmed Chentouf	3						3			
17	MF	(Morocco)	Abdelhamid Maâli	3						3			
19	FW	(Morocco)	Jawad Rhabra	6						6			
20	MF	(Morocco)	Ennama El Bellali	4	1					4	1		
21	MF	(Morocco)	Hamza Moudene	4						4			
22	DF	(Morocco)	Zakaria Kiani	2						2			
23	DF	(Morocco)	Anass Lamrabat	7		1				7		1	
24	DF	(Morocco)	Akram El Wahabi	1						1			
27	MF	(Morocco)	Solaymane Ait Dani			1						1	
28	FW	(Morocco)	Karim Lagrouch	2						2			
49	DF	(Morocco)	Louay El Moussaoui	3						3			
72	FW	(Senegal)	Papa Magueye Gaye	5		1				5		1	
79	MF	(Ivory Coast)	Siriki Sanogo			1						1	
97	DF	(Morocco)	Badr Gaddarine	1						1			
99	FW	(Morocco)	Zakaria Bakkali	1						1			
~~—~~		(Morocco)	Hilal Et-tair (coach)	1						1			
—		(Algeria)	bdelhak Benchikha (coach)	1						1			

Last updated: 5 July 2026
Source: soccerway.com
Only competitive matches
(yellow card) = Number of bookings; (second yellow card) = Number of sending offs after a second yellow card; (red card) = Number of sending offs by a direct red card.

=== Injury record ===
N	P	Nat.	Name	Type	Status	Source	Match	Inj. Date	Ret. Date
21	MF	(Morocco)	Hamza Moudene	Muscular injury to the inner left thigh			in training	12 September 2025	25 October 2025
16	MF	(Morocco)	Ahmed Chentouf	Meniscus injury in the left knee			vs HUS Agadir	12 September 2025	2 November 2025
19	FW	(Morocco)	Jawad Rhabra	Muscle tear in the right rectus femoris muscle			in training	6 March 2026	4 April 2026
97	DF	(Morocco)	Badr Gaddarine	Stable fracture of the maxilla accompanied by misalignment of the upper anterior teeth			vs COD Meknès	6 March 2026	4 April 2026
9	FW	(Republic of the Congo)	Dylan Saint-Louis	Ankle injury			vs Kenitra AC	11 April 2026	
16	MF	(Morocco)	Ahmed Chentouf	Knee Cartilage injury			vs MA Tetouan	18 April 2026	8 June 2026
99	FW	(Belgium)	Zakaria Bakkali	Disc herniation			in training	29 April 2026	
10	MF	(France)	Mohamed El Arouch	Poisoning			Out of play	3 May 2026	17 May 2026
21	MF	(Morocco)	Hamza Moudene	A fracture in one of the ribs			vs AS FAR	3 May 2026	8 June 2026
14	FW	(Morocco)	Haitam El Bahja	Quadriceps injury			in warming-ups	3 May 2026	17 May 2026
4	DF	(Morocco)	Mohamed Saoud	A right ankle sprain with a bone contusion			vs Difaâ El Jadidi	10 May 2026	22 May 2026
49	DF	(Morocco)	Louay El Moussaoui	Grade 2 Adductor muscle injury			vs Difaâ El Jadidi	10 May 2026	8 June 2026

- Player is injured
- Player has recovered from injury
Last updated: 8 June 2026
Source: clubirt, irtfoot.ma

== See also ==
- 2015–16 IR Tanger season
- 2016–17 IR Tanger season
- 2017–18 IR Tanger season
- 2018–19 IR Tanger season
- 2019–20 IR Tanger season
- 2020–21 IR Tanger season
- 2021–22 IR Tanger season
- 2022–23 IR Tanger season
- 2023–24 IR Tanger season
- 2024–25 IR Tanger season
