= Siriki =

Siriki is a given name. Notable people with the name include:

- Siriki Dembélé (born 1996), Ivorian footballer
- Siriki Sanogo (born 2001), Ivorian footballer
