= Barcola (surname) =

Barcola is a surname. It may refer to:

- Bradley Barcola (born 2002), French footballer
- Malcolm Barcola (born 1999), Togo international footballer
