= 2021–22 Olympique Lyonnais season =

Olympique Lyonnais
2021–22 season
- President: Jean-Michel Aulas
- Head coach: Peter Bosz
- Stadium: Parc Olympique Lyonnais
- Ligue 1: 8th
- Coupe de France: Round of 64
- UEFA Europa League: Quarter-finals
- Top goalscorer: League: Moussa Dembélé (21); All: Moussa Dembélé (22)
- Highest home attendance: 50,585 vs Monaco
- Lowest home attendance: 0 vs Reims
- Biggest win: Lyon 6–1 Bordeaux
- Biggest defeat: Angers 3–0 Lyon; Rennes 4–1 Lyon; Lyon 0–3 West Ham United
Home colours	Away colours	Third colours

The 2021–22 season was the 72nd season in the existence of Olympique Lyonnais and the club's 33rd consecutive season in the top flight of French football. In addition to the domestic league, Lyon participated in this season's editions of the Coupe de France and the UEFA Europa League. The club was expelled from the domestic cup due to crowd trouble during their game against Paris FC.

== Players ==
=== First-team squad ===
Note: Flags indicate national team as defined under FIFA eligibility rules; some limited exceptions apply. Players may hold more than one non-FIFA nationality.

No.	Pos.	Nation	Player
1	GK	POR	Anthony Lopes
2	DF	CIV	Sinaly Diomandé
3	DF	ITA	Emerson (on loan from Chelsea)
4	DF	FRA	Castello Lukeba
5	DF	BEL	Jason Denayer
7	FW	CMR	Karl Toko Ekambi
8	MF	FRA	Houssem Aouar (3rd captain)
9	FW	FRA	Moussa Dembélé (vice-captain)
10	MF	BRA	Lucas Paquetá
11	FW	ZIM	Tino Kadewere
12	DF	BRA	Henrique
14	DF	FRA	Léo Dubois (captain)
15	MF	FRA	Romain Faivre

No.	Pos.	Nation	Player
16	GK	TOG	Malcolm Barcola
17	DF	FRA	Malo Gusto
18	FW	FRA	Rayan Cherki
19	MF	MLI	Habib Keïta
20	MF	BRA	Tetê (on loan from Shakhtar Donetsk)
21	DF	FRA	Damien Da Silva
22	MF	FRA	Jeff Reine-Adélaïde
23	MF	BRA	Thiago Mendes
25	MF	FRA	Maxence Caqueret
27	DF	GER	Jérôme Boateng
28	MF	FRA	Tanguy Ndombele (on loan from Tottenham Hotspur)
30	GK	GER	Julian Pollersbeck

=== Out on loan ===
Note: Flags indicate national team as defined under FIFA eligibility rules; some limited exceptions apply. Players may hold more than one non-FIFA nationality.

No.	Pos.	Nation	Player
—	DF	TUR	Cenk Özkaçar (at (Belgium) Leuven)
—	DF	MLI	Youssouf Koné (at (France) Troyes)
—	DF	FRA	Sofyan Cola (at (France) Bourg-en-Bresse)
—	MF	BRA	Camilo (at (Brazil) Cuiabá)

No.	Pos.	Nation	Player
—	MF	FRA	Sofiane Augarreau (at (Belgium) Virton)
—	MF	FRA	Florent da Silva (at (France) Villefranche)
—	FW	FRA	Yaya Soumaré (at (France) Annecy)
—	FW	FRA	Eli Wissa (at (France) Villefranche)

== Transfers ==
=== In ===
No.	Pos.	Player	Transferred from	Fee	Date	Source
21	DF	(France) Damien Da Silva	(France) Rennes	Free	1 July 2021	
	DF	(Denmark) Joachim Andersen	(England) Fulham	Loan return	30 July 2021	
	DF	(Mali) Youssouf Koné	(Spain) Elche	Loan return	30 July 2021	
9	FW	(France) Moussa Dembélé	(Spain) Atlético Madrid	Loan return	1 July 2021	
12	DF	(Brazil) Henrique	(Brazil) Vasco da Gama	Free	1 July 2021	
3	DF	(Italy) Emerson	(England) Chelsea	Loan (€0.5M)	19 August 2021	
29	FW	(Switzerland) Xherdan Shaqiri	(England) Liverpool	€10M	23 August 2021	
27	DF	(Germany) Jérôme Boateng	Free agent	Free	31 August 2021	
15	MF	(France) Romain Faivre	(France) Brest	€15M	31 January 2022	
28	MF	(France) Tanguy Ndombele	(England) Tottenham Hotspur	Loan (€1.4M)	31 January 2022	
20	MF	(Brazil) Tetê	(Ukraine) Shakhtar Donetsk	Loan	31 March 2022	

=== Out ===
No.	Pos.	Player	Transferred to	Fee	Date	Source
	FW	(France) Yaya Soumaré	(France) Dijon	Loan	16 June 2021	
22	MF	(Italy) Mattia De Sciglio	(Italy) Juventus	End of loan	30 June 2021	
10	FW	(Netherlands) Memphis Depay	(Spain) Barcelona	Free	1 July 2021	
19	DF	(Turkey) Cenk Özkacar	(Belgium) OH Leuven	Loan	6 July 2021	
3	DF	(Algeria) Djamel Benlamri	Qatar SC	Free	15 July 2021	
26	DF	(France) Melvin Bard	(France) Nice	€3M	16 July 2021	
3	DF	(Denmark) Joachim Andersen	(England) Crystal Palace	€22M	28 July 2021	
4	MF	(Brazil) Jean Lucas	(France) Monaco	€11M	2 August 2021	
	DF	(Mali) Youssouf Koné	(France) Troyes	Loan	2 August 2021	
27	DF	(Ivory Coast) Maxwel Cornet	(England) Burnley	€15M	29 August 2021	
6	DF	(Brazil) Marcelo	(France) Bordeaux	Free	28 January 2022	
39	MF	(Brazil) Bruno Guimarães	(England) Newcastle United	€50.1M	30 January 2022	
20	FW	(Algeria) Islam Slimani	(Portugal) Sporting CP	Free	31 January 2022	
29	MF	(Switzerland) Xherdan Shaqiri	(United States) Chicago Fire	€6.7M	9 February 2022	

=== Transfer summary ===
Spending

Summer: ▼€10,500,000

Winter: ▼€16,400,000

Total: ▼€26,900,000

Income

Summer: ▲€51,000,000

Winter: ▲€56,800,000

Total: ▲€107,800,000

Net Expenditure

Summer: ▲€40,500,000

Winter: ▲€40,400,000

Total: ▲€80,900,000

== Pre-season and friendlies ==
Win Draw Loss

10 July 2021 Friendly	Lyon (France)	5–1	(France) Bourg-Péronnas	Bourgoin-Jallieu, France
21:00 CEST (UTC+2)	Dembélé 30', 45'; Barcola 62'; Slimani 76'; Lukeba 79'	Report	Corgnet (yellow card) 41'; Ezikian 51'	Stadium: Stade Pierre Rajon

17 July 2021 Friendly	Lyon (France)	2–0	(France) Villefranche	Lyon, France
18:30 CEST (UTC+2)	Slimani 15'; Diomandé 37'; Keïta (yellow card) 72'	Report		Stadium: Parc Olympique Lyonnais; Referee: Mickaël Leleu

17 July 2021 Friendly	Lyon (France)	4–1	(Germany) VfL Wolfsburg	Lyon, France
21:00 CEST (UTC+2)	Toko Ekambi 7', 55'; Dembélé 28'; Bonnet (yellow card) 80'; Wissa 82' (pen.)	Report	Ginczek 29'; Gerhardt (yellow card) 31'; Otávio (yellow card) 62'	Stadium: Parc Olympique Lyonnais; Attendance: 8,000; Referee: Romain Lissorgue

22 July 2021 Friendly	Villarreal (Spain)	2–2	(France) Lyon	San Pedro del Pinatar, Spain
20:00 CEST (UTC+2)	Gómez 23'; Dia 38'; Pedraza (yellow card) 43'; Morlanes (yellow card) 64'	Report	Jean Lucas 8'; Aouar 44'	Stadium: Pinatar Arena Football Center; Attendance: 0 Referee: Juan Antonio Campos Salinas

25 July 2021 Friendly	Sporting CP (Portugal)	3–2	(France) Lyon	Lisbon, Portugal
20:00 WEST (UTC+1)	Mendes (yellow card) 23'; Paulinho 31', 49'; Gonçalves 35'	Report	Aouar 8'; Slimani 90+2'	Stadium: Estádio José Alvalade

31 July 2021 Friendly	Porto (Portugal)	5–3	(France) Lyon	Porto, Portugal
17:30 WEST (UTC+1)	Oliveira 4' (pen.); Vieira 30'; Sanusi (yellow card) 45'; Pepe 79'; Martínez 83', (yellow card) 89'; Taremi 84'	Report	Keïta (yellow card) 34'; Marcelo 40'; Toko Ekambi 54'; Slimani 81'	Stadium: Estádio do Dragão; Referee: Vitor Ferreira

== Competitions ==
=== Overall record ===
Competition	First match	Last match	Starting round	Final position	Record							
Competition	First match	Last match	Starting round	Final position	Pld	W	D	L	GF	GA	GD	Win %
Ligue 1	7 August 2021	21 May 2022	Matchday 1	8th	38	17	11	10	66	51	+15	44.74
Coupe de France	17 December 2021		Round of 64	Round of 64	0	0	0	0	0	0	+0	—
UEFA Europa League	16 September 2021	14 April 2022	Group stage	Quarter-finals	10	6	3	1	19	10	+9	60.00
Total					48	23	14	11	85	61	+24	47.92

Source: Soccerway

=== Ligue 1 ===
==== League table ====
Pos	Team	Pld	W	D	L	GF	GA	GD	Pts	Qualification or relegation
6	Strasbourg	38	17	12	9	60	43	+17	63	
7	Lens	38	17	11	10	62	48	+14	62	
8	Lyon	38	17	11	10	66	51	+15	61 (Note: Lyon were deducted one point for uncontrolled crowd trouble that caused the abandonment of their match against Marseille.)	
9	Nantes	38	15	10	13	55	48	+7	55	Qualification for the Europa League group stage (Note: Nantes qualified for the Europa League group stage as the 2021–22 Coupe de France winners.)
10	Lille	38	14	13	11	48	48	0	55	

Source: Ligue 1
Rules for classification: 1) Points; 2) Goal difference; 3) Head-to-head points; 4) Head-to-head goal difference; 5) Head-to-head goals scored; 6) Head-to-head away goals scored; 7) Goals scored; 8) Away goals scored; 9) Fair-play points (Note: Head-to-head record is used only after all the matches between the teams in question have been played).

==== Results summary ====
Overall								Home						Away					
Pld	W	D	L	GF	GA	GD	Pts	W	D	L	GF	GA	GD	W	D	L	GF	GA	GD
38	17	11	10	66	51	+15	62	11	5	3	42	25	+17	6	6	7	24	26	−2

Source: Ligue 1

==== Results by round ====
Round	1	2	3	4	5	6	7	8	9	10	11	12	13	14	15	16	17	18	19	20	21	22	23	24	25	26	27	28	29	30	31	32	33	34	35	36	37	38
Ground	H	A	H	A	H	A	H	H	A	H	A	H	A	H	A	H	A	A	H	H	A	H	A	H	A	H	A	H	A	H	A	H	A	H	A	A	H	A
Result	D	L	D	W	W	L	W	D	D	W	L	W	L	W	W	L	D	D	D	D	W	W	L	W	D	L	W	L	D	W	D	W	L	W	W	L	W	W
Position	10	17	16	9	7	9	6	7	10	6	9	6	7	9	7	10	12	13	13	11	11	7	8	7	8	10	9	10	10	9	10	8	8	8	7	8	8	8

Source: Ligue 1
A = Away; H = Home; W = Win; D = Draw; L = Loss

==== Matches ====
The league fixtures were announced on 25 June 2021.

7 August 2021 1	Lyon	1–1	Brest	Décines-Charpieu
17:00 CEST (UTC+2)	Slimani 62', (yellow card) 90+3'	Report	Cardona 43'; Magnetti (yellow card) 67'	Stadium: Parc Olympique Lyonnais; Attendance: 29,018; Referee: Mikael Lesage

15 August 2021 2	Angers	3–0	Lyon	Angers
13:00 CEST (UTC+2)	Boufal 20'; Marcelo 53' (o.g.); Ounahi 77'; Mendy (yellow card) 82'	Report	Lukeba (yellow card) 3'; Marcelo (yellow card) 36'; Cornet (yellow card) 49' (yellow-red card) 65'; Diomande (yellow card) 87'	Stadium: Stade Raymond Kopa; Attendance: 6,154; Referee: Clément Turpin

22 August 2021 3	Lyon	3–3	Clermont	Décines-Charpieu
13:00 CEST (UTC+2)	Dembélé 5' (pen.), 21'; Bruno Guimarães (yellow card) 30'; Paquetá 45+1'; Toko Ekambi (yellow card) 45+3'	Report	Diomandé 12' (o.g.); Ogier (yellow card) 52'; Rashani 80', 90+1'; Abdul Samed (yellow card) 85'	Stadium: Parc Olympique Lyonnais; Attendance: 34,713; Referee: Thomas Léonard

27 August 2021 4	Nantes	0–1	Lyon	Nantes
21:00 CEST (UTC+2)	Fabio (yellow card) 7'; Kolo Muani (yellow card) 90+3'	Report	Dembélé 35'; Da Silva (yellow card) 43' (yellow-red card) 78'	Stadium: Stade de la Beaujoire; Attendance: 23,177; Referee: Jérôme Brisard

12 September 2021 5	Lyon	3–1	Strasbourg	Décines-Charpieu
20:45 CEST (UTC+2)	Dembélé 8'; Diomandé (yellow card) 29'; Denayer 64'; Boateng (yellow card) 84'; Paquetá 87'	Report	Djiku (yellow card) 47'; Diallo 90+6' (pen.)	Stadium: Parc Olympique Lyonnais; Attendance: 33,267; Referee: Ruddy Buquet

19 September 2021 6	Paris Saint-Germain	2–1	Lyon	Paris
20:45 CEST (UTC+2)	Di María (yellow card) 6'; Neymar 66' (pen.); Marquinhos (yellow card) 67'; Mendes (yellow card) 89'; Icardi 90+2'	Report	Paquetá 54'; Lopes (yellow card) 80'	Stadium: Parc des Princes; Attendance: 47,611; Referee: Clément Turpin

22 September 2021 7	Lyon	3–1	Troyes	Décines-Charpieu
21:00 CEST (UTC+2)	Shaqiri 48'; Emerson 72'; Paquetá 87', (yellow card) 90+2'	Report	Azamoum (yellow card) 15'; Giraudon (yellow card) 28'; Chavalerin 45'; Biancone (yellow card) 63'	Stadium: Parc Olympique Lyonnais; Attendance: 29,714; Referee: Stéphanie Frappart

25 September 2021 8	Lyon	1–1	Lorient	Décines-Charpieu
21:00 CEST (UTC+2)	Emerson (red card) 15'; Toko Ekambi 50'; Dubois (yellow card) 67'	Report	Laurienté 20'; Abergel (yellow card) 28'; Lemoine (yellow card) 61'	Stadium: Parc Olympique Lyonnais; Attendance: 36,424; Referee: Bastien Dechepy

3 October 2021 9	Saint-Étienne	1–1	Lyon	Saint-Étienne
21:00 CEST (UTC+2)	Nordin (yellow card) 32'; Camara (yellow card) 45+3'; Khazri 90+4' (pen.)	Report	Aouar 42'; Dubois (yellow card) 45+3'; Lopes (red card) 74'; Toko Ekambi (yellow card) 90+1'; Denayer (yellow card) 90+3'	Stadium: Stade Geoffroy-Guichard; Attendance: 33,643; Referee: François Letexier

16 October 2021 10	Lyon	2–0	Monaco	Décines-Charpieu
21:00 CEST (UTC+2)	Toko Ekambi 74' (pen.); Caqueret (yellow card) 76'; Denayer 89'	Report	Disasi (yellow card) 72'; Jean Lucas (yellow card) 75'	Stadium: Parc Olympique Lyonnais; Attendance: 50,585; Referee: Amaury Delerue

24 October 2021 11	Nice	3–2	Lyon	Nice
13:00 CEST (UTC+2)	Atal 81'; Delort 89' (pen.); Guessand 90+1', (yellow card) 90+2'	Report	Toko Ekambi 35'; Aouar 68'; Kadewere (red card) 85'	Stadium: Allianz Riviera; Attendance: 24,519; Referee: Jérôme Brisard

30 October 2021 12	Lyon	2–1	Lens	Décines-Charpieu
21:00 CEST (UTC+2)	Paquetá (yellow card) 10'; Toko Ekambi 25' (pen.); Aouar 41'	Report	Sotoca (yellow card) 38'; Clauss (yellow card) 54'; Kalimuendo 61'	Stadium: Parc Olympique Lyonnais; Attendance: 50,373; Referee: Mikael Lesage

7 November 2021 13	Rennes	4–1	Lyon	Rennes
20:45 CET (UTC+1)	Santamaria (yellow card) 25'; Omari (yellow card) 34'; Laborde 45'; Traoré 51'; Truffert 76', 83'	Report	Bruno Guimarães (yellow card) 40'; Slimani (yellow card) 51'; Paquetá 90+3' (pen.)	Stadium: Roazhon Park; Attendance: 28,222; Referee: Benoît Bastien

28 November 2021 15	Montpellier	0–1	Lyon	Montpellier
17:00 CET (UTC+1)	Ferri (yellow card) 68'	Report	Paquetá 16'; Slimani (yellow card) 29'; Caqueret (yellow card) 40'; Boateng (yellow card) 45'; Emerson (yellow card) 67'	Stadium: Stade de la Mosson; Attendance: 14,747; Referee: Thomas Léonard

1 December 2021 16	Lyon	1–2	Reims	Décines-Charpieu
21:00 CET (UTC+1)	Paquetá (yellow card) 23'; Denayer (yellow card) 49'; Toko Ekambi 66'; Dembélé (yellow card) 82'	Report	Munetsi (yellow card) 53'; Faes 56'; Abdelhamid (yellow card) 65'; Ekitike 90+2'	Stadium: Parc Olympique Lyonnais; Attendance: 0 (Behind closed doors); Referee: Benoît Millot

5 December 2021 17	Bordeaux	2–2	Lyon	Bordeaux
20:45 CET (UTC+1)	Gusto 36' (o.g.); Elis 58'	Report	Denayer 29'; Mendes 41'	Stadium: Matmut Atlantique; Attendance: 25,210; Referee: Jérôme Brisard

12 December 2021 18	Lille	0–0	Lyon	Villeneuve-d'Ascq
13:00 CET (UTC+1)	André (yellow card) 17'; Çelik (yellow card) 22'	Report	Mendes (yellow card) 24'; Da Silva (yellow card) 45+1'; Gusto (yellow card) 82'; Dembélé (yellow card) 88'; Boateng (yellow card) 90+3'; Cherki (yellow card) 90+5'	Stadium: Stade Pierre-Mauroy; Attendance: 40,248; Referee: Amaury Deleure

22 December 2021 19	Lyon	1–1	Metz	Décines-Charpieu
21:00 CET (UTC+1)	Caqueret (yellow card) 30'; Da Silva (yellow card) 39'; Lukeba 56'	Report	Jemerson (yellow card) 34'; Traoré 58'; Maïga (yellow card) 68'; Mbengue (yellow card) 84'	Stadium: Parc Olympique Lyonnais; Attendance: 34,867; Referee: Pierre Gaillouste

9 January 2022 20	Lyon	1–1	Paris Saint-Germain	Décines-Charpieu
20:45 CET (UTC+1)	Paquetá 9'; Emerson (yellow card) 84'; Boateng (yellow card) 90'	Report	Verratti (yellow card) 43'; Dagba (yellow card) 59'; Kehrer 76'	Stadium: Parc Olympique Lyonnais; Attendance: 4,977; Referee: François Letexier

16 January 2022 21	Troyes	0–1	Lyon	Troyes
17:05 CET (UTC+1)	Rodrigues (yellow card) 45+4'; Giraudon (yellow card) 65'	Report	Dembélé 33' (pen.); Gusto (yellow card) 86'	Stadium: Stade de l'Aube; Attendance: 4,224; Referee: Jérôme Brisard

21 January 2022 22	Lyon	1–0	Saint-Étienne	Décines-Charpieu
21:00 CET (UTC+1)	Dembélé 15' (pen.); Da Silva (yellow card) 59'	Report	Gourna-Douath (yellow card) 19'; Camara (yellow card) 42'; Maçon (yellow card) 50'; Thioub (yellow card) 90+1'	Stadium: Parc Olympique Lyonnais; Attendance: 5,000; Referee: Antony Gautier

1 February 2022 14	Lyon	2–1	Marseille	Décines-Charpieu
21:00 CET (UTC+1)	Shaqiri 76'; Dembélé 89'	Report	Guendouzi 10'	Stadium: Parc Olympique Lyonnais; Attendance: 0 (Behind closed doors); Referee: Benoît Bastien
Note: The match was originally played on 21 November 2021 at the Parc Olympique Lyonnais, but was abandoned after five minutes, with the score at 0–0, due to Dimitri Payet being hit by a bottle.

5 February 2022 23	Monaco	2–0	Lyon	Monaco
21:00 CET (UTC+1)	Jean Lucas 2'; Ben Yedder 27'; Maripán (yellow card) 69'	Report	Dembélé (yellow card) 64'; Boateng (yellow card) 69'	Stadium: Stade Louis II; Attendance: 6,550; Referee: Ruddy Buquet

12 February 2022 24	Lyon	2–0	Nice	Décines-Charpieu
21:00 CET (UTC+1)	Dembélé 8' (pen.); Toko Ekambi 52'	Report	Todibo (yellow card) 50'	Stadium: Parc Olympique Lyonnais; Attendance: 41,974; Referee: Benoît Millot

19 February 2022 25	Lens	1–1	Lyon	Lens
17:00 CET (UTC+1)	Clauss 13'	Report	Kadewere 44'; Emerson (yellow card) 70'; Dubois (yellow card) 84'	Stadium: Stade Bollaert-Delelis; Referee: Jérôme Brisard

27 February 2022 26	Lyon	0–1	Lille	Décines-Charpieu
20:45 CET (UTC+1)	Dembélé (yellow card) 19'; Caqueret (yellow card) 43'; Aouar (yellow card) 90+2'	Report	Gudmundsson 35'; David (yellow card) 81'; Xeka (yellow card) 83'	Stadium: Parc Olympique Lyonnais; Attendance: 42,657; Referee: Clément Turpin

4 March 2022 27	Lorient	1–4	Lyon	Lorient
21:00 CET (UTC+1)	Monconduit (yellow card) 32'; Moffi 56'	Report	Faivre 5', 78'; Dembélé 26'; Toko Ekambi 59'	Stadium: Stade du Moustoir; Attendance: 13,497; Referee: Romain Lissorgue

13 March 2022 28	Lyon	2–4	Rennes	Décines-Charpieu
17:05 CET (UTC+1)	Mendes (yellow card) 11'; Ndombele (yellow card) 20'; Traoré 58' (o.g.); Dembélé 82' (pen.)	Report	Bourigeaud 11'; Santamaria 13'; Truffert (yellow card) 27'; Majer 45+1'; Terrier 49'; Doku (yellow card) 68'; Gomis (yellow card) 80'	Stadium: Parc Olympique Lyonnais; Attendance: 46,597; Referee: Antony Gautier

20 March 2022 29	Reims	0–0	Lyon	Reims
17:05 CET (UTC+1)		Report	Caqueret (yellow card) 27'; Henrique (yellow card) 45+2'; Toko Ekambi (yellow card) 79'	Stadium: Stade Auguste-Delaune; Attendance: 14,091; Referee: Johan Hamel

3 April 2022 30	Lyon	3–2	Angers	Décines-Charpieu
17:05 CEST (UTC+2)	Dembélé 26', 52'; Tetê 80'; Henrique (yellow card) 85'	Report	Pereira Lage 50'; Boufal 59'; Doumbia (yellow card) 90+2'	Stadium: Parc Olympique Lyonnais; Attendance: 34,376; Referee: Eric Wattellier

10 April 2022 31	Strasbourg	1–1	Lyon	Strasbourg
19:00 CEST (UTC+2)	Sissoko 20', (yellow card) 90+2'; Aholou (yellow card) 68'; Ajorque (yellow card) 90+1'	Report	Toko Ekambi 90'; Dubois (yellow card) 90+1'	Stadium: Stade de la Meinau; Attendance: 26,073; Referee: Clément Turpin

17 April 2022 32	Lyon	6–1	Bordeaux	Décines-Charpieu
17:05 CEST (UTC+2)	Dembélé 20', 90+2'; Toko Ekambi 27', 68'; Paquetá 34'; Faivre 46'	Report	Mara 85' (pen.)	Stadium: Parc Olympique Lyonnais; Attendance: 38,713; Referee: Florent Batta

20 April 2022 33	Brest	2–1	Lyon	Brest
21:00 CEST (UTC+2)	Mounié 27' (pen.); Faussurier (yellow card) 30'; Satriano (yellow card) 58'; Cardona 74'	Report	Tete (yellow card) 18'; Mendes (yellow card) 55'; Dembélé 72'	Stadium: Stade Francis-Le Blé; Attendance: 14,028; Referee: Jérémy Stinat

23 April 2022 34	Lyon	5–2	Montpellier	Décines-Charpieu
17:00 CEST (UTC+2)	Dembélé 26'; Omlin 43' (o.g.); Aouar 63', 90+3'; Toko Ekambi 68'; Boateng (yellow card) 75'; Gusto (yellow card) 89'	Report	Oyongo (yellow card) 28'; Cozza (yellow card) 42'; Wahi 45+1'; Savanier 45+3' (pen.)	Stadium: Parc Olympique Lyonnais; Attendance: 46,608; Referee: François Letexier

1 May 2022 35	Marseille	0–3	Lyon	Marseille
20:45 CEST (UTC+2)	López (yellow card) 57'; Gueye (yellow card) 71'	Report	Lukeba 55'; Dembélé (yellow card) 60', (goal) 76'; Toko Ekambi 89'	Stadium: Stade Vélodrome; Attendance: 64,784; Referee: Antony Gautier

8 May 2022 36	Metz	3–2	Lyon	Metz
13:00 CEST (UTC+2)	Pajot 27'; Lamkel Zé 40'; Niakaté (yellow card) 70'; Traoré (yellow card) 74'; De Préville (yellow card) 88'; Boulaya 90'	Report	Dembélé 43', 84'; Mendes (red card) 68'; Ndombele (yellow card) 86'; Dubois (yellow card) 90+3'	Stadium: Stade Saint-Symphorien; Attendance: 20,405; Referee: Eric Wattellier

14 May 2022 37	Lyon	3–2	Nantes	Décines-Charpieu
21:00 CEST (UTC+2)	Dembélé 9'; Ndombele (yellow card) 61'; Paquetá 78'; Tetê 84'	Report	Merlin 80'; Cyprien 90+2'	Stadium: Parc Olympique Lyonnais; Attendance: 54,404; Referee: Florent Batta

21 May 2022 38	Clermont	1–2	Lyon	Clermont-Ferrand
21:00 CEST (UTC+2)	N'Simba (yellow card) 26'; Bayo (penalty missed) 59', 59'; Rashani (yellow card) 90'	Report	Dembélé 27', (yellow card) 90+4'; Henrique (yellow card) 39'; Aouar 48'	Stadium: Stade Gabriel Montpied; Attendance: 12,306; Referee: Mikael Lesage

=== Coupe de France ===
Due to violent behavior by their fan base, Lyon was kicked out of the Coupe de France.

17 December 2021 Round of 64	Paris FC	Abandoned	Lyon	Paris
21:00 CET (UTC+1)				Stadium: Stade Sébastien Charléty; Attendance: 15,717; Referee: Jérémy Stinat
Note: Match abandoned after half time with score 1–1 due to crowd trouble. On 27 December 2021, the French Football Federation announced that both Paris FC and Lyon were disqualified from the cup, with Paris FC playing their next five home matches outside of their Stade Charléty home ground.

=== UEFA Europa League ===
==== Group stage ====
The draw for the group stage was held on 27 August 2021.

Pos	Team	Pld	W	D	L	GF	GA	GD	Pts	Qualification	LYO	RAN	SPP	BRO
1	(France) Lyon	6	5	1	0	16	5	+11	16	Advance to round of 16	—	1–1	3–0	3–0
2	(Scotland) Rangers	6	2	2	2	6	5	+1	8	Advance to knockout round play-offs	0–2	—	2–0	2–0
3	(Czech Republic) Sparta Prague	6	2	1	3	6	9	−3	7	Transfer to Europa Conference League	3–4	1–0	—	2–0
4	(Denmark) Brøndby	6	0	2	4	2	11	−9	2		1–3	1–1	0–0	—

Source: UEFA
Rules for classification: Group stage tiebreakers

16 September 2021 1	Rangers (Scotland)	0–2	(France) Lyon	Glasgow, Scotland
21:00 CEST (UTC+2)	Goldson (yellow card) 14'; Aribo (yellow card) 74'; Morelos (yellow card) 75'	Report	Toko Ekambi 23'; Slimani (yellow card) 30'; Boateng (yellow card) 53'; Tavernier 55' (o.g.)	Stadium: Ibrox Stadium; Attendance: 44,906; Referee: Andreas Ekberg (Sweden)

30 September 2021 2	Lyon (France)	3–0	(Denmark) Brøndby	Décines-Charpieu, France
18:45 CEST (UTC+2)	Emerson (yellow card) 6'; Caqueret (yellow card) 35'; Toko Ekambi 64', 71'; Aouar 85'	Report		Stadium: Parc Olympique Lyonnais; Attendance: 25,466; Referee: Harald Lechner (Austria)

21 October 2021 3	Sparta Prague (Czech Republic)	3–4	(France) Lyon	Prague, Czech Republic
21:00 CEST (UTC+2)	Haraslín 4', 19', (yellow card) 59'; Pavelka (yellow card) 80'; Krejčí II 90+6'	Report	Henrique (yellow card) 25'; Toko Ekambi 42', 88', (yellow card) 62'; Gusto (yellow card) 52' (yellow-red card) 74'; Aouar 53'; Boateng (yellow card) 59'; Dubois (yellow card) 63'; Paquetá 67', (yellow card) 68'; Mendes (yellow card) 85'	Stadium: Stadion Letná; Attendance: 12,427; Referee: Matej Jug (Slovenia)

4 November 2021 4	Lyon (France)	3–0	(Czech Republic) Sparta Prague	Décines-Charpieu, France
18:45 CET (UTC+1)	Slimani 61', 64'; Toko Ekambi 90+2'	Report	Vindheim (yellow card) 40'; Krejčí II (yellow card) 63'	Stadium: Parc Olympique Lyonnais; Attendance: 33,934; Referee: Maurizio Mariani (Italy)

25 November 2021 5	Brøndby (Denmark)	1–3	(France) Lyon	Brøndbyvester, Denmark
21:00 CET (UTC+1)	Greve (yellow card) 27'; Uhre 51'; Tshiembe (yellow card) 85'	Report	Cherki 57', 66'; Slimani 76'; Da Silva (yellow card) 78'	Stadium: Brøndby Stadium; Attendance: 16,645; Referee: Georgi Kabakov (Bulgaria)

9 December 2021 6	Lyon (France)	1–1	(Scotland) Rangers	Décines-Charpieu, France
18:45 CET (UTC+1)	Bassey 49' (o.g.)	Report	S. Wright 42'; Patterson (yellow card) 74'	Stadium: Parc Olympique Lyonnais; Attendance: 26,842; Referee: Radu Petrescu (Romania)

==== Knockout phase ====
===== Round of 16 =====
The draw for the round of 16 was held on 25 February 2022.

9 March 2022 First leg	Porto (Portugal)	0–1	(France) Lyon	Porto, Portugal
18:45 CET (UTC+1)	Otávio (yellow card) 74'; Conceição (yellow card) 90+6'	Report	Paquetá 59'; Dubois (yellow card) 64'	Stadium: Estádio do Dragão; Attendance: 26,309; Referee: José María Sánchez Martínez (Spain)

17 March 2022 Second leg	Lyon (France)	1–1 (2–1 agg.)	(Portugal) Porto	Décines-Charpieu, France
21:00 CET (UTC+1)	Dembélé 13'; Dubois (yellow card) 60'; Caqueret (yellow card) 83'	Report	Eustáquio (yellow card) 18'; Pepe 27'; Evanilson (yellow card) 82'	Stadium: Parc Olympique Lyonnais; Attendance: 54,551; Referee: Ovidiu Hațegan (Romania)

===== Quarter-finals =====
The draw for the quarter-finals was held on 18 March 2022.

7 April 2022 First leg	West Ham United (England)	1–1	(France) Lyon	London, England
20:00 BST (UTC+1)	Cresswell (red card) 45+3'; Bowen 52', (yellow card) 90+6'; Antonio (yellow card) 88'	Report	Ndombele 66'	Stadium: London Stadium; Attendance: 59,978; Referee: Felix Zwayer (Germany)

14 April 2022 Second leg	Lyon (France)	0–3 (1–4 agg.)	(England) West Ham United	Décines-Charpieu, France
21:00 CEST (UTC+2)	Barcola (yellow card) 84'	Report	Diop (yellow card) 22'; Dawson 38'; Rice 44'; Bowen 48'; Fornals (yellow card) 85'	Stadium: Parc Olympique Lyonnais; Attendance: 50,065; Referee: Sandro Schärer (Switzerland)

== Statistics ==
=== Appearances and goals ===
No.	Pos	Nat	Player	Total		Ligue 1		Coupe de France		UEFA Europa League	
No.	Pos	Nat	Player	Apps	Goals	Apps	Goals	Apps	Goals	Apps	Goals
Goalkeepers
1	GK	(Portugal) POR	Anthony Lopes	42	0	34	0	0	0	8	0
16	GK	(Togo) TOG	Malcolm Barcola	0	0	0	0	0	0	0	0
30	GK	(Germany) GER	Julian Pollersbeck	8	0	4+2	0	0	0	2	0
40	GK	(France) FRA	Kayne Bonnevie	0	0	0	0	0	0	0	0
Defenders
2	DF	(Ivory Coast) CIV	Sinaly Diomandé	17	0	5+6	0	0	0	4+2	0
3	DF	(Italy) ITA	Emerson	36	1	26+3	1	0	0	6+1	0
4	DF	(France) FRA	Castello Lukeba	30	1	24	1	0	0	6	0
5	DF	(Belgium) BEL	Jason Denayer	21	3	12+3	3	0	0	5+1	0
12	DF	(Brazil) BRA	Henrique	22	0	12+6	0	0	0	4	0
14	DF	(France) FRA	Léo Dubois	28	0	20+3	0	0	0	3+2	0
17	DF	(France) FRA	Malo Gusto	37	0	21+9	0	0	0	5+2	0
21	DF	(France) FRA	Damien Da Silva	21	0	13+4	0	0	0	4	0
27	DF	(Germany) GER	Jérôme Boateng	27	0	19+5	0	0	0	3	0
52	DF	(France) FRA	Hugo Vogel	2	0	0	0	0	0	1+1	0
Midfielders
8	MF	(France) FRA	Houssem Aouar	45	8	29+7	6	0	0	6+3	2
10	MF	(Brazil) BRA	Lucas Paquetá	44	11	32+3	9	0	0	5+4	2
15	MF	(France) FRA	Romain Faivre	18	3	9+5	3	0	0	4	0
19	MF	(Mali) MLI	Habib Keïta	6	0	0+3	0	0	0	2+1	0
22	MF	(France) FRA	Jeff Reine-Adélaïde	11	0	1+9	0	0	0	0+1	0
23	MF	(Brazil) BRA	Thiago Mendes	37	1	21+8	1	0	0	8	0
24	MF	(Senegal) SEN	Pape Cheikh Diop	0	0	0	0	0	0	0	0
25	MF	(France) FRA	Maxence Caqueret	39	0	26+5	0	0	0	6+2	0
28	MF	(France) FRA	Tanguy Ndombele	15	1	7+4	0	0	0	4	1
Forwards
7	FW	(Cameroon) CMR	Karl Toko Ekambi	40	18	26+4	12	0	0	7+3	6
9	FW	(France) FRA	Moussa Dembélé	36	22	25+5	21	0	0	6	1
11	FW	(Zimbabwe) ZIM	Tino Kadewere	20	1	3+12	1	0	0	2+3	0
18	FW	(France) FRA	Rayan Cherki	20	2	3+13	0	0	0	3+1	2
20	FW	(Brazil) BRA	Tetê	11	2	7+2	2	0	0	2	0
31	FW	(France) FRA	Lenny Pintor	0	0	0	0	0	0	0	0
33	FW	(France) FRA	Bradley Barcola	13	0	2+9	0	0	0	0+2	0
Players transferred out during the season
6	DF	(Brazil) BRA	Marcelo	2	0	2	0	0	0	0	0
20	FW	(Algeria) ALG	Islam Slimani	16	4	6+6	1	0	0	3+1	3
27	DF	(Ivory Coast) CIV	Maxwel Cornet	1	0	1	0	0	0	0	0
28	MF	(France) FRA	Florent Da Silva	0	0	0	0	0	0	0	0
29	MF	(Switzerland) SUI	Xherdan Shaqiri	16	2	9+2	2	0	0	4+1	0
39	MF	(Brazil) BRA	Bruno Guimarães	25	0	19+1	0	0	0	2+3	0

Last updated: 1 June 2022
Source: Competitions

=== Goalscorers ===
As of 1 June 2022

Rank	No.	Pos.	Nat.	Player	Ligue 1	Coupe de France	Europa League	Total
2	9	FW	(France)	Moussa Dembélé	21	0	1	22
2	7	FW	(Cameroon)	Karl Toko Ekambi	12	0	6	18
3	10	MF	(Brazil)	Lucas Paquetá	9	0	2	11
4	8	MF	(France)	Houssem Aouar	6	0	2	8
5	20	FW	(Algeria)	Islam Slimani	1	0	3	4
6	5	DF	(Belgium)	Jason Denayer	3	0	0	3
6	15	MF	(France)	Romain Faivre	3	0	0	3
8	18	MF	(France)	Rayan Cherki	0	0	2	2
8	29	MF	(Switzerland)	Xherdan Shaqiri	2	0	0	2
8	4	DF	(France)	Castello Lukeba	2	0	0	2
8	20	FW	(Brazil)	Tetê	2	0	0	2
12	3	DF	(Italy)	Emerson	1	0	0	1
12	11	FW	(Zimbabwe)	Tino Kadewere	1	0	0	1
12	23	MF	(Brazil)	Thiago Mendes	1	0	0	1
12	28	MF	(France)	Tanguy Ndombele	0	0	1	1
Own goals					2	0	2	2
Totals					66	0	19	85
