= Alami Ahannach =

Dutch-Moroccan footballer and manager

Personal information
- Date of birth: 20 September 1969 (age 57)
- Place of birth: Tétouan, Morocco
- Height: 1.83 m (6 ft 0 in)
- Position: Midfielder

Senior career*
Years	Team	Apps	(Gls)
1992–1996	Telstar	88	(3)
1996–1998	MVV Maastricht	44	(0)
1998–1999	Telstar	21	(1)
1999–2003	FC Emmen	63	(2)
2003–2004	WKE	0	(0)

International career
1996	Morocco	1	(0)

Managerial career
- 2009–2010: PKC '83
- 2010: WKE
- 2011–2015: FC Chabab
- * Club domestic league appearances and goals as of 00:49, 27 August 2012 (UTC)

Alami Ahannach (born 20 September 1969) is a Moroccan football manager and former international player.

== Playing career ==
Ahannach spent his whole playing career in the Netherlands, playing over 200 professional games throughout his career. He also played a total 20 games in the Dutch top flight as a MVV Maastricht player in 1997–98 and the initial part of the 1998–99 season. He retired in 2004, after four seasons with second-tier club FC Emmen and a lone season with amateurs WKE (still based in the city of Emmen).

== International career ==
Ahannach also played once in 1996 as an international player, as part of the Moroccan national team.

== Coaching career ==
Ahannach started his post-playing career as a youth coach of FC Emmen. In 2009, he was appointed head coach of amateurs PKC '83, then filling the same position at WKE in 2010. He also briefly served as assistant of Al Jazira Club in 2006.

In the summer of 2011 he was appointed assistant coach of professional football club Telstar. Later in December he was named new head coach of Hoofdklasse amateurs FC Chabab, while retaining his Telstar job at the same time. He led Chabab to instant success, managing to bring the team into the promotion playoffs and then ensure it a place in the Topklasse league (the highest division in Dutch amateur football).

== Personal life ==
His younger brother Soufyan Ahannach is now a professional footballer. His cousin Anass Ahannach is a footballer as well.
