= Mohamed El Arouch =

French footballer (born 2004)

Personal information
- Date of birth: 6 April 2004 (age 22)
- Place of birth: Orange, France
- Height: 1.66 m (5 ft 5 in)
- Position: Midfielder

Team information
- Current team: IR Tanger
- Number: 10

Youth career
- 2010–2017: SC Orange
- 2017–2022: Lyon

Senior career*
Years	Team	Apps	(Gls)
2021–2024	Lyon B	34	(6)
2022–2024	Lyon	2	(0)
2024	Botafogo	0	(0)
2025	RWD Molenbeek	6	(0)
2025–	IR Tangier	23	(1)

International career^{‡}
2019–2020	France U16	7	(1)
2022	France U18	1	(0)
2022	France U19	1	(0)
2023	France U20	2	(1)
- * Club domestic league appearances and goals as of 2 November 2026 ‡ National team caps and goals as of 11 September 2023

Mohammed El Arouch (born 6 April 2004) is a French professional footballer who plays as a midfielder for Botola Pro club IR Tangier.

== Early career ==
El Arouch was born in Orange in a family of Moroccan descent. El Arouch began his football career at the local club Sporting Club d'Orange in 2009. Considered outclassed by the coaches of his team with a decent quality of passing and dribbling, the young player received the interest of many French clubs (PSG, OM, Monaco, Nice...) and even English (Manchester City...). but his choice fell on Lyon, whom he joined in 2018.

In July 2021, he signed his first professional contract with the club, for three seasons, until 30 June 2024. He is regarded by the media as one of biggest talents ever produced by Olympique Lyon's Academy.

During the 2021–22 season, El Arouch played a crucial role on Lyon's Coupe Gambardella's successful campaign, leading the team winning the competition for the first time since 1997. He scored twice in course of the competition, notably the opening goal in the final at the Stade de France, where Lyon defeated Caen 5–4 in a penalty shootout after a 1–1 draw in regular time.

== Club career ==
On 25 February 2023, El Arouch made his professional debut with Lyon, getting subbed on in a Ligue 1 win against Angers, replacing Thiago Mendes in the 89th minute.

On 21 August 2024, El Arouch moved to Brazil, signing for Campeonato Brasileiro Série A club Botafogo. However, he left a month later without having played a single game for the team for "personal reasons".

On 3 February 2025, El Arouch joined Belgian side RWD Molenbeek, signing a two-year contract. On 12 December 2025, he left the club by mutual consent. A day later, he joined Botola Pro side IR Tangier.

== International career ==
El Arouch chose to represent France instead of Morocco at youth level. He was capped 7 times France under-16, scoring once against Italy under-16 in a friendly match. He then represented France's under-18, under-19 and under-20 sides.

== Career statistics ==
As of match played 2 November 2026

Appearances and goals by club, season and competition
Club	Season	League			Cup		Continental		Other		Total	
Club	Season	Division	Apps	Goals	Apps	Goals	Apps	Goals	Apps	Goals	Apps	Goals
Lyon B	2020–21	National 2	2	0	—		—		—		2	0
Lyon B	2021–22	National 2	9	2	—		—		—		9	2
Lyon B	2022–23	National 2	17	3	—		—		—		17	3
Lyon B	2023–24	National 3	6	1	—		—		—		6	1
Lyon B	Total		34	6	—		—		—		34	6
Lyon	2022–23	Ligue 1	1	0	1	0	—		—		2	0
Lyon	2023–24	Ligue 1	1	0	0	0	—		—		1	0
Lyon	Total		2	0	1	0	—		—		3	0
Botafogo	2024	Campeonato Brasileiro	0	0	—		0	0	—		0	0
RWD Molenbeek	2024–25	Challenger Pro League	4	0	—		—		2 (Note: Appearances in the Belgian Pro League promotion play-offs)	0	6	0
IR Tanger	2025–26	Botola Pro	17	1	1	0	—		—		18	1
IR Tanger	2026–27	Botola Pro	6	0	0	0	—		—		6	0
IR Tanger	Total		23	1	1	0	—		—		24	1
Career total			63	7	2	0	0	0	2	0	66	7

== Honours ==
Lyon Youth

- Coupe Gambardella: 2021–22

Botafogo

- Campeonato Brasileiro: 2024
