= Anass Ahannach =

Moroccan footballer (born 1998)

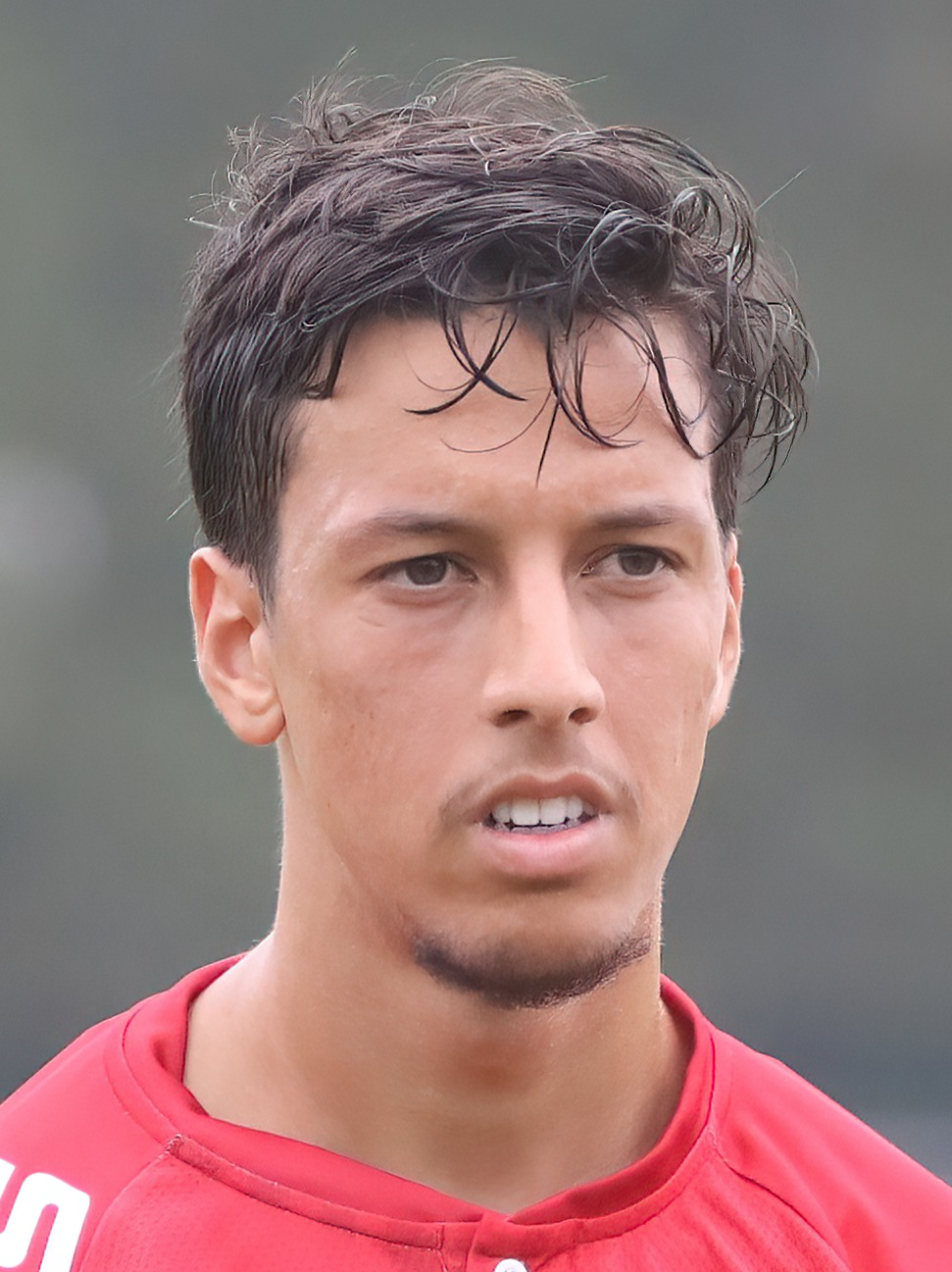
- Photo: Urs Keller

Personal information
- Date of birth: 7 February 1998 (age 28)
- Place of birth: Amsterdam, Netherlands
- Height: 1.79 m (5 ft 10 in)
- Position: Midfielder

Youth career
- –2006: AFC
- 2006–2010: Ajax
- 2010–2011: AFC
- 2011–2017: Almere City

Senior career*
Years	Team	Apps	(Gls)
2017–2022	Jong Almere City	17	(1)
2017–2022	Almere City	86	(8)
2022–2024	Den Bosch	24	(6)
2025–2026	Muangthong United	25	(2)

International career
2018	Morocco U23	1	(0)
- * Club domestic league appearances and goals as of 05:43, 12 May 2026 (UTC)

Anass Ahannach (Arabic: أنس أحناش; born 7 February 1998) is a professional footballer who plays as a midfielder. Born in the Netherlands, he represents Morocco internationally.

== Club career ==
Ahannach made his Eerste Divisie debut for Almere City FC on 15 September 2017 in a game against FC Dordrecht.

On 13 June 2022, Ahannach signed a two-year contract with Den Bosch.

== International career ==
Ahannach was born in the Netherlands and is of Moroccan descent. He debuted for the Morocco national under-23 football team in a 1–1 friendly tie with the Tunisia U23s on 9 September 2018.

== Personal life ==
His cousin Soufyan Ahannach is also a footballer. Soufyan's brother (and Anass's cousin) Alami Ahannach is a football coach and a former Moroccan international footballer.
