= Ayoub Adila =

Moroccan professional footballer

Personal information
- Date of birth: 19 March 1996 (age 30)
- Place of birth: Casablanca, Morocco
- Position: Defensive midfielder

Team information
- Current team: Amal Tiznit
- Number: 14

Youth career
- –2018: Wydad Casablanca
- 2018–2019: Widad Témara
- 2019–2020: Chabab Atlas Khénifra

Senior career*
Years	Team	Apps	(Gls)
2020–2021	Chabab Mohamedia	7	(0)
2021–2022	Rapide Oued Zem		
2022–2024	Chabab Mohamedia		
2024–2025	Raja Beni Mellal		
2025–	Amal Tiznit		
- * Club domestic league appearances and goals as of 18 April 2020

Ayoub Adila is a Moroccan professional football player who plays as a defensive midfielder.
