= Soufyan Ahannach =

Dutch footballer (born 1995)

Personal information
- Date of birth: 9 September 1995 (age 31)
- Place of birth: Amsterdam, Netherlands
- Height: 1.73 m (5 ft 8 in)
- Position: Winger

Team information
- Current team: Union de Touarga

Youth career
- 2007–2008: VVA/Spartaan
- 2008–2011: DWS
- 2011–2013: Almere City FC

Senior career*
Years	Team	Apps	(Gls)
2013–2017	Almere City	85	(28)
2017–2020	Brighton & Hove Albion	0	(0)
2018	→ Sparta Rotterdam (loan)	12	(1)
2019	→ Union SG (loan)	2	(0)
2020	Go Ahead Eagles	6	(1)
2021–2022	Den Bosch	45	(8)
2022–2023	Al-Arabi	8	(0)
2023	→ Al-Rawdhah (loan)		
2023–2024	Wydad Casablanca	7	(0)
2024–	Union de Touarga	12	(0)

International career
2013	Netherlands U18	1	(0)
- * Club domestic league appearances and goals as of 20:33, 12 January 2024 (UTC)

Soufyan Ahannach (born 9 September 1995) is a Dutch professional footballer who plays as a winger for Union de Touarga.

== Club career ==
Ahannach started his professional career with Eerste Divisie side Almere City, before moving on to England.

On 10 August 2017, Ahannach signed for Premier League club Brighton & Hove Albion on a five-year contract. He was loaned out to Sparta Rotterdam of the Eredivisie for the 2017–18 season where he scored once in twelve appearances. Ahannach signed for Belgian second tier side Union SG on 2 September 2019 on a season-long loan.

Ahannach returned to Brighton in January 2020 where he was released. He then signed with Go Ahead Eagles for the remainder of the season.

On 2 February 2021, it was announced that Ahannach had signed with FC Den Bosch. The move reunited him with Jack de Gier, his manager at Almere City.

On 9 June 2022, Ahannach joined Saudi Arabian side Al-Arabi. On 2 January 2023, Ahannach joined Al-Rawdhah on loan.

In August 2023, Ahannach joined Moroccan side Wydad AC.

== International career ==
On 26 March 2013, Ahannach gained a cap for the Netherlands U18 team in a friendly against Germany. He came on as a substitute in the 74th minute for Jorrit Hendrix.

== Career statistics ==
As of end of 2018–19 season

Appearances and goal by club, season and competition
Club	Season	League			Cup		League Cup		Other		Total	
Club	Season	Division	Apps	Goals	Apps	Goals	Apps	Goals	Apps	Goals	Apps	Goals
Almere City FC	2012–13	Eerste Divisie	2	0	0	0	—		—		2	0
Almere City FC	2013–14	Eerste Divisie	6	0	0	0	—		—		6	0
Almere City FC	2014–15	Eerste Divisie	13	3	0	0	—		2 (Note: Appearances in the Eerste Divisie promotion play-offs)	1	15	4
Almere City FC	2015–16	Eerste Divisie	26	7	2	0	—		4	3	32	10
Almere City FC	2016–17	Eerste Divisie	38	18	2	0	—		2	0	42	18
Almere City FC	Total		85	28	4	0	—		8	4	97	32
Brighton & Hove Albion	2017–18	Premier League	0	0	0	0	1	0	—		1	0
Brighton & Hove Albion U-23s	2017–18	Premier League 2, Div2	—		—		—		2 (Note: Appearance in the EFL Trophy)	0	2	0
Sparta Rotterdam (loan)	2017–18	Eredivisie	12	1	0	0	—		0	0	12	1
Union Saint-Gilloise (loan)	2019–20	Belgian First Division B	0	0	0	0	—				0	0
Career total			97	29	4	0	1	0	10	4	112	33

== Personal life ==
His older brother Alami Ahannach is a football coach and a former Moroccan international footballer. His cousin Anass Ahannach is also a footballer.

Ahannach is a Muslim, and follows the purist salafist branch of the religion. He wears a beard with a trimmed moustache and observes the salah five times daily.
