= Ousama Siddiki =

Moroccan footballer (born 1998)

Personal information
- Full name: Ousama Siddiki El Horfi
- Date of birth: 13 April 1998 (age 28)
- Place of birth: Tanger, Morocco
- Height: 1.81 m (5 ft 11 in)
- Position: Winger

Team information
- Current team: Antequera
- Number: 11

Youth career
- 2011–2012: Siete Picos
- 2012–2013: Rayo Vallecano
- 2013–2015: Colmenar Viejo
- 2015–2017: Real Madrid
- 2017–2018: Leeds United

Senior career*
Years	Team	Apps	(Gls)
2018–2019	Logroñés B	19	(6)
2019–2022	Logroñés	67	(0)
2022–2023	Algeciras	29	(3)
2023–2024	Melilla	33	(6)
2024–	Antequera	53	(9)

International career^{‡}
2016	Morocco U20	4	(0)
- * Club domestic league appearances and goals as of 10 June 2026 ‡ National team caps and goals as of 12 November 2016

Ousama Siddiki El Horfi (born 13 April 1998) is a Moroccan professional footballer who plays as a right winger for Spanish club Antequera. He also holds Spanish citizenship.

== Club career ==
Born in Tanger, Siddiki moved to Spain at early age and joined Real Madrid's La Fábrica in January 2015, from AD Colmenar Viejo. In July 2017, he signed for EFL Championship side Leeds United, being initially assigned to the under-18 squad.

On 5 August 2018, Siddiki agreed to a contract with UD Logroñés, being initially assigned to the reserves in Tercera División. He made his senior debut on 26 August, starting and scoring the opener in a 2–0 away win against CD Agoncillo.

Siddiki made his first team debut on 20 January 2019, coming on as a late substitute for Víctor López in a 1–0 Segunda División B away win against Barakaldo CF. On 29 June, he renewed his contract until 2021, being definitely promoted to the main squad.

Siddiki featured sparingly for UDL during the 2019–20 campaign, contributing with 18 appearances overall as his side achieved a first-ever promotion to Segunda División. On 21 August 2020, he further extended his contract until 2022.

Siddiki made his professional debut on 26 September 2020, starting in a 1–1 home draw against CD Castellón.
