= Saad Ait Khorsa =

Moroccan footballer

Personal information
- Date of birth: 3 January 1994 (age 32)
- Place of birth: Safi, Morocco
- Height: 1.86 m (6 ft 1 in)
- Position: Left back

Team information
- Current team: FUS

Senior career*
Years	Team	Apps	(Gls)
2014–2017	Olympique Safi	69	(5)
2017–2023	FUS Rabat	6	(1)
2023–2026	Maghreb Fez		
2026–	IR Tangier		

International career
	Morocco U20	1	
	Morocco A'	2	(1)
- * Club domestic league appearances and goals

Saad Ait Khorsa (Arabic: سعد آيت خورسة; born 3 January 1994 in Safi, Morocco) is a Moroccan footballer who plays as a defender for FUS Rabat.

He is considered to be one of the best left backs in Botola. He scored in the last group stage match of the 2017 UAFA Club Championship to help secure the qualification of his club to the semi-final.
