= Bilal El Ouadghiri =

Moroccan footballer (born 2001)

Personal information
- Date of birth: 3 August 2001 (age 25)
- Place of birth: Fez, Morocco
- Height: 1.81 m (5 ft 11 in)
- Position: Centre-back

Team information
- Current team: IR Tanger
- Number: 77

Youth career
- –2021: Maghreb de Fès

Senior career*
Years	Team	Apps	(Gls)
2021–2023	Maghreb de Fès	35	(3)
2023–2024	FUS Rabat	24	(0)
2025–	IR Tanger	8	(0)

International career^{‡}
2021	Morocco U20	1	(0)
2023–	Morocco U23	1	(0)
- * Club domestic league appearances and goals as of 28 March 2024 ‡ National team caps and goals as of 20:57, 9 March 2025 (UTC)

Bilal El Ouadghiri (Arabic: بلال الودغيري; born 3 August 2001) is a Moroccan professional footballer who plays as a centre-back for IR Tanger.

== Club career ==
El Ouadghiri was born in Fez, Morocco and joined the MAS de Fes training center at a young age. He was trained at the same time as his teammates Salaheddine Alami and Hamza El Janati.

During the 2020–21 season, El Ouadghiri came into play on 19 April 2021 and played his first minutes as a professional with Maghreb de Fès against Chabab Mohammédia, coming into play in place of Karim El Oualadi in the 66th minute (draw, 1-1). During that season, he only played one match and ended his year in seventh place in the Botola Pro rankings.

During the 2021–22 season, El Ouadghiri established himself as a key player and received his first start at home on 25 December 2021, against IR Tanger (victory, 2–1). On 15 May 1202, he scored his first own goal against Chabab Mohammédia (victory, 1–3).

On 18 January 2023, El Ouadghiri scored his first professional goal against AS FAR (defeat, 2–1).

== International career ==
On 21 March 2021, El Ouadghiri received his first call-up to the national team for a training camp in Saïdia with the Morocco U-20 team under the leadership of manager Zakaria Aboub.

On 3 October 2021, El Ouadghiri was on the list of those called up for the Morocco U-23 team managed by Hicham Dmiai for a training camp at the Maâmora Sports Centre in Salé.

On 22 March 2023, El Ouadghiri joined Morocco U-23 under new manager Issame Charaï for a friendly match against Ivory Coast in Rabat as part of the preparations for the U-23 Africa Cup of Nations which took place in Morocco in 2023. During this match, he started but conceded three goals (defeat, 2–3). Two days later, he appeared on the bench during a new friendly match against Togo, making no appearance (victory, 2–0).

Ayman El Wafi withdrew from the 2024 Summer Olympics on 9 July 2024 after his club refused to release him, and El Ouadghiri was called up to replace him.
