= Serge Romano =

French footballer (born 1964)

Personal information
- Date of birth: 25 May 1964 (age 62)
- Place of birth: Metz, France
- Position: Defender

Senior career*
Years	Team	Apps	(Gls)
1987–1992	FC Metz	136	(8)
1992–1994	Toulouse		
1994–1996	Martigues		
1996–1997	Wolverhampton Wanderers		
1997–1998	Troyes		

Managerial career
- 2002: Troyes
- 2004–2006: CS Sedan Ardennes
- 2007: Dijon
- 2009: Amiens
- 2012–2014: Dalian Aerbin (youth)
- 2014–2016: Qatar (assistant)
- 2016–2017: Nottingham Forest (assistant)
- 2018–: Algeria (assistant)
- * Club domestic league appearances and goals

Serge Romano (born 25 May 1964) is a French retired professional footballer and coach who was most recently assistant manager of Nottingham Forest.

== Coaching career ==
He became Amiens SC manager in June 2009. and on 15 October 2009 Amiens have communicated to have fired their coach, that will be temporarily replaced by Fabien Mercadal.
