= Badr Gaddarine =

Moroccan footballer

Personal information
- Full name: Badr Gaddarine
- Date of birth: 20 October 1997 (age 29)
- Place of birth: Casablanca, Morocco
- Height: 1.80 m (5 ft 11 in)
- Position: Left back

Senior career*
Years	Team	Apps	(Gls)
2017–2022	Wydad AC	40	(3)
2025–2026	IR Tanger	32	(0)
- * Club domestic league appearances and goals ‡ National team caps and goals as of 9 March 2025

Badr Gaddarine is a Moroccan professional footballer, who last played as a left back.
