= Siriki Sanogo =

Ivorian footballer

Personal information
- Date of birth: 21 December 2001 (age 24)
- Place of birth: Bingerville, Ivory Coast
- Height: 1.78 m (5 ft 10 in)
- Positions: Striker; midfielder

Team information
- Current team: IR Tanger
- Number: 78

Youth career
- USD San Nicola
- 2017–2018: Benevento

Senior career*
| Years | Team | Apps | (Gls) |
| 2018–2023 | Benevento | 5 | (0) |
| 2021–2022 | → Pescara (loan) | 0 | (0) |
| 2022 | → Schaffhausen (loan) | 2 | (0) |
| 2025– | → IR Tanger | 1 | (0) |
- * Club domestic league appearances and goals as of 9 March 2025

Siriki Sanogo (born 21 December 2001) is an Ivorian professional footballer who plays as a midfielder or forward for IR Tanger.

== Club career ==
Sanogo joined the Benevento Calcio youth academy in February from USD San Nicola on 10 February 2017. He made his debut for Benevento in a 1–0 Serie A win over Genoa on 12 May 2018.

On 17 January 2022, his loan to Pescara was terminated early. On 16 February 2022, Sanogo was loaned by Schaffhausen in Switzerland.
