= Malcolm Barcola =

Footballer (born 1999)

Personal information
- Full name: Malcolm Danjouma Dyhezina Barcola
- Date of birth: 14 May 1999 (age 27)
- Place of birth: Lyon, France
- Height: 1.95 m (6 ft 5 in)
- Position: Goalkeeper

Team information
- Current team: IR Tangier
- Number: 12

Youth career
- 2016–2018: Lyon

Senior career*
Years	Team	Apps	(Gls)
2018–2022	Lyon B	27	(0)
2021–2022	Lyon	0	(0)
2022–2023	Tuzla City	8	(0)
2024	Paços de Ferreira	0	(0)
2025–	IR Tangier	3	(0)

International career^{‡}
2019–	Togo	28	(0)
- * Club domestic league appearances and goals as of 19 November 2026 ‡ National team caps and goals as of 20 June 2026

Malcolm Danjouma Dyhezina Barcola (born 14 May 1999) is a professional footballer who plays as a goalkeeper for Moroccan Botola Pro club IR Tangier. Born in France, he plays for the Togo national team.

== International career ==
Barcola made his Togo national team on 10 September 2019 in the second leg of the first round of 2022 World Cup qualification against the Comoros. He kept a clean sheet as his country advanced to the next round.

== Personal life ==
Barcola's brother Bradley is also a professional footballer player for Liverpool Football Club.

== Career statistics ==
=== Club ===
As of match played 9 November 2024

Appearances and goals by club, season and competition
Club	Season	League			National cup (Note: Includes Bosnia and Herzegovina Football Cup)		Total	
Club	Season	Division	Apps	Goals	Apps	Goals	Apps	Goals
Lyon B	2018–19	CFA 2	5	0	—		5	0
Lyon B	2019–20	CFA 2	5	0	—		5	0
Lyon B	2020–21	CFA 2	3	0	—		3	0
Lyon B	2021–22	CFA 2	14	0	—		14	0
Lyon B	Total		27	0	—		27	0
Lyon	2020–21	Ligue 1	0	0	0	0	0	0
Lyon	2021–22	Ligue 1	0	0	0	0	0	0
Lyon	Total		0	0	0	0	0	0
Tuzla City	2022–23	Premier League of Bosnia and Herzegovina	8	0	2	0	10	0
Paços de Ferreira	2024–25	Liga Portugal 2	0	0	0	0	0	0
Career total			35	0	2	0	37	0

=== International ===
As of match played 5 June 2026

Appearances and goals by national team and year
National team	Year	Apps	Goals
Togo	2019	5	0
Togo	2020	3	0
Togo	2021	6	0
Togo	2022	6	0
Togo	2023	1	0
Togo	2024	3	0
Togo	2025	1	0
Togo	2026	3	0
Total		28	0
