= Benguerir =

Benguerir ابن جرير ⴱⵏⴳⵔⵉⵔ
- City
- The Mohammed V arterial Avenue. The main road of the Mohammed VI Green City. Buildings near the railway station.
- Interactive map of Benguerir
- Coordinates: 32°14′12.036″N 7°57′12.528″W
- Country: Morocco
- Region: Marrakesh-Safi
- Province: Rehamna

Government
  - Mayor: Ouardi Abdellatif
- Elevation: 449 m (1,473 ft)

Population (2024)
  - Total: 114,872
  - Rank: 32nd in Morocco
- Time zone: UTC+0 (GMT)
- ZIP codes: 43150
- Area code: +212
- Website: Benguerir Commune

Benguerir or Ben Guerir (Moroccan Arabic: بن ڭرير; Standard Moroccan Tamazight: ⴱⵏ ⴳⵔⵉⵔ; officially Arabic: ابن جرير) is a city in central Morocco and the capital of the Rehamna province, within the Marrakesh-Safi region. Located on the semi-arid Gantour sedimentary basin roughly 72 km (45 mi) north of Marrakesh, it recorded a population of 114,872 in the 2024 Moroccan census. Situated in the historical territory of the Rehamna tribe at the crossroads of National Route 9, Regional Route 206, the A3 expressway, and the Casablanca–Marrakesh and Benguerir–Safi railway lines, the city serves as an industrial, educational, and military hub.

First founded in the pre-colonial era as a neutral weekly Tuesday market along the caravan route linking Fez and Marrakesh, the settlement was the site of the August 1912 Affaire de Ben Guerir during the French conquest of Morocco and subsequently grew under the French Protectorate around the estate of Caid El-Ayyadi ben El-Hachemi and the colonial rail junction completed between 1928 and 1936. After Moroccan independence, Benguerir expanded rapidly following the opening of the OCP Group's open-pit phosphate mine in 1980 and its designation as the capital of the newly created Rehamna Province in 2009.

Since 2009, the city's economy and urban fabric have been reshaped by the Mohammed VI Green City, an OCP-backed urban development project on the southern edge of the town that hosts University Mohammed VI Polytechnic (UM6P), the Lycée Mohammed VI d'Excellence (Lydex), the 1337 Coding School (part of the 42 Network), and renewable energy research facilities such as the Green Energy Park. Directly south of the city lies Ben Guerir Air Base, a Royal Moroccan Air Force installation built by the United States Strategic Air Command in the 1950s that served from 1988 to 2002 as a NASA Space Shuttle Transoceanic Abort Landing (TAL) site.

== Name and etymology ==
The name derives from "son of Jarir" ("Ben Guerir") following a common Moroccan geographic pattern (similar to Ben Slimane or Fquih Ben Salah). The name can be traced back to an individual associated with the Hilalian tribe of Oulad Jarir who settled along the trade route linking Fez and Marrakesh, creating a weekly Tuesday market (Souq Tlat Ibn Jarir) in the area. Because he was neutral to Rahamna tribal factions, the site served as an open gathering point. The local Arabic dialect permits the phonetic alternation between the knotted kaf / gaf (ڭ) and standard jim (ج), making Benguerir and Ibn Jarir linguistically identical.

The city's name is rendered in several spelling variations in Arabic:

- ابن جرير (Ibn Jarir), used by the municipal council of Benguerir.
- بن ڭرير reflects the pronunciation in Moroccan Arabic, using the letter gaf (ڭ).
- بنجرير and بن جرير substitute the Standard Arabic jim (ج) for gaf, and frequently appear in state administrative records and national transport schedules.

== Geography ==
=== Topography and geology ===
Benguerir is situated in the western Moroccan Meseta within the central portion of the Gantour sedimentary basin, an east–west plateau stretching 120–125 km (75–78 mi) in length and 20–30 km (12–19 mi) in width (~2,500 km^{2} (970 sq mi)), bounded to the north by the Paleozoic metamorphic massif of Rehamna, to the south by the Paleozoic schist hills of Jbilet, to the west by the Jurassic hills of Mouissat, and to the east by the Oued Tassaout river. The terrain around Benguerir consists of a relatively flat, undulating plateau elongated from east to west over 25–30 km (16–19 mi) with a width of 10–20 km (6.2–12.4 mi) and an average elevation ranging between 430–449 m (1,411–1,473 ft) above sea level.

The urban core of Benguerir is traversed from north to south by an ephemeral watercourse (wadi) and stormwater channel designated in municipal records as Oued Bouchane (and labeled in railway engineering records and cartography as Oued Ben Guerir), which is crossed at the southern rail approach by a dedicated railway viaduct completed in 2016 during the doubling of the Settat–Marrakesh line. Although dry for most of the year, the urban bed of Oued Bouchane and its tributaries periodically accumulates stagnant rainwater, silt, and solid waste after rainfall events, and is prone to flash flood risks, prompting the Rehamna Association for the Environment to call for regular dredging. A 22.43 million MAD project to rehabilitate the channel of Oued Bouchane into an urban ecological greenway was launched in November 2025 under the 2024–2027 Benguerir urban upgrading program.

=== Climate ===
Benguerir lies in the semi-arid region of Rehamna (Köppen: BSh), evolving towards an arid climate during recurrent droughts. It is water-scarce and subject to extreme climate vulnerability and temperature fluctuations, ranging from minimum temperatures of 4.3 °C (39.7 °F) to 5.1 °C (41.2 °F) to maximum temperatures of 37.5 °C (99.5 °F) to 39.3 °C (102.7 °F). Peak maximum land surface temperature went from 33.90 °C (93.02 °F) in 1994 to 46.30 °C (115.34 °F) in 2024.

The Benguerir countryside after heavy rainfalls in February 2026.

Between 2013 and 2019, the annual average daily maximum and minimum temperatures are 27.03 °C (80.65 °F) and 19.12 °C (66.42 °F). August is the hottest month of the year with a maximum and minimum average daily temperature of 37.02 °C (98.64 °F) and 27.72 °C (81.90 °F). January is the coldest month of the year with a maximum and minimum average daily temperature in the range respectively of 18.14 °C (64.65 °F) and 11.37 °C (52.47 °F).

Between 2013 and 2019, a period marked by prolonged drought, annual rainfall varied between 168 mm (6.6 in) and 230 mm (9.1 in), with 85% of all rainfall happening between October and April and entirely dry summer months (< 1 mm). In early 2026, during the end of the drought in Morocco, rainfall considerably increased in Rehamna, and regenerated the vegetative cover across 57,000 hectares (220 sq mi) of land in the region. The table below shows data over a longer period (1996–2025), with higher mean daily maximums and lower mean daily minimums than those recording between 2013 and 2019, and a higher average precipitation of 307 mm (12.1 in).

Climate data for Benguerir
Month	Jan	Feb	Mar	Apr	May	Jun	Jul	Aug	Sep	Oct	Nov	Dec	Year
Record high °C (°F)	—	—	—	—	—	46.4 (115.5)	—	—	—	—	—	—	46.4 (115.5)
Mean daily maximum °C (°F)	19.1 (66.4)	20.8 (69.4)	23.6 (74.5)	25.9 (78.6)	29.5 (85.1)	34.0 (93.2)	38.1 (100.6)	38.2 (100.8)	33.2 (91.8)	29.3 (84.7)	23.4 (74.1)	19.9 (67.8)	27.9 (82.2)
Mean daily minimum °C (°F)	6.9 (44.4)	7.6 (45.7)	9.4 (48.9)	10.9 (51.6)	13.5 (56.3)	17.0 (62.6)	19.5 (67.1)	20.5 (68.9)	18.1 (64.6)	15.8 (60.4)	11.2 (52.2)	8.2 (46.8)	13.2 (55.8)
Average precipitation mm (inches)	42.5 (1.67)	33.5 (1.32)	40.6 (1.60)	27.3 (1.07)	14.7 (0.58)	3.6 (0.14)	4.4 (0.17)	2.8 (0.11)	13.7 (0.54)	26.5 (1.04)	52.2 (2.06)	45.2 (1.78)	307 (12.08)
Average precipitation days (≥ 1.0 mm)	6.0	6.0	7.0	4.0	3.0	1.0	0.0	1.0	3.0	4.0	6.0	7.0	48
Average relative humidity (%)	64	63	61	61	55	49	43	43	52	54	59	63	56
Source 1: NASA POWER grid cell at 32.24°N, 7.95°W, elevation 474 m; 1996–2025 normals (MERRA-2 reanalysis via MeteoPlus)
Source 2: Direction Générale de la Météorologie (June record high)

=== Urban layout ===
Benguerir consists of older popular neighborhoods and subdivisions built around the weekly souk and Avenue Mohammed V, including Hay Ifriquia, Hay Chouaibat, Hay El Zaouia (Sahat El Bahira), Hay El Taqaddoum, Hay Ennour, Hay El Jadid (and Hay El Jadid Nord), Hay El Majd, Hay El Amal, Hay Errachad, and Hay Errahma, alongside the planned OCP mining-employees residential district of Hay Moulay Rachid (Arabic: حي مولاي رشيد الفوسفاطي). Benguerir is also home to the Mohammed VI Green City, located near Hay Moulay Rachid, originally planned as a new city but legally within the municipal limits of the Benguerir commune.

The city sits at the junction of the north-south National Route 9, which skirts the western side of the urban core between Casablanca and Marrakesh, and the east-west Regional Route 206, which links Youssoufia and National Route 7 in the west to El Kelaa des Sraghna in the east, while serving as the main arterial corridor along the northern edge of the University Mohammed VI Polytechnic campus and OCP's Benguerir facilities.

Urban geography studies characterize Benguerir as having a dual and fragmented urban fabric with the Mohammed VI Green City planned on 684 ha (2.64 sq mi) of vacant OCP land in direct continuity with the existing town and organized around an 80-hectare (0.31-square-mile) north-south ecological corridor linking five mixed-use urban modules, but in reality lacking spatial integration and disconnecting the new eco-city from the older urban quarters.

== History ==
=== Pre-colonial period ===
Benguerir was originally founded as a weekly Tuesday market (souk) known as Souq Tlat Ibn Jarir (Arabic: ثلاث بن جرير), by an individual, most probably a merchant, from the Hilalian tribe of Oulad Jarir, who regularly travelled between Fez and Marrakesh for trade, named Ibn Jarir. The precise date of its foundation remains unknown. The market acted as a crossroad between Marrakesh, Fez and Atlantic ports (like Safi and El Jadida). Its site was selected because of its flat terrain, accessible groundwater, proximity to established tribes and position along a protected historic caravan route secured by rest posts (nzayil, Arabic: نزائل). The site also functioned as a neutral meeting ground between tribes, without territorial dispute, as the founder was not a member of the local Rahamna factions. The founder was neither a Sufi saint (wali) nor is there a tomb (darih) or religious lodge (zawiya) associated with the site.

During the reigns of sultans Hassan I and Abdelaziz, the Makhzen actively invested in the Rehamna region's pastoral economy. Documents from the Hassani archives show the Makhzen supplied local tribal leaders with work animals in the late 19th century.

=== French protectorate (1912–1956) ===
In August 1912, French military units under Colonel Charles Mangin mobilized south from Mechra Ben Abbou through Skhour Rhamna to suppress the anti-colonial uprising led by Ahmed al-Hiba. On 29 August 1912, Mangin's expeditionary column engaged Ahmed al-Hiba's forces at Benguerir, routing the southern detachment and securing the forward approach toward Marrakesh. French military records officially designated the action of 29 August 1912 as the Benguerir Affair (French: Affaire de Ben Guerir) a key engagement preceding the decisive Battle of Sidi Bou Othmane on 6 September 1912.

Under the French Protectorate, the colonial administration governed the Rehamna region through Caid El-Hajj El-Ayyadi ben El-Hachemi, who allied with General Hubert Lyautey to control the northern entrance to Marrakesh. Caid El-Ayyadi established a fortified estate and residence in Benguerir, maintaining administrative coordination with French officials.

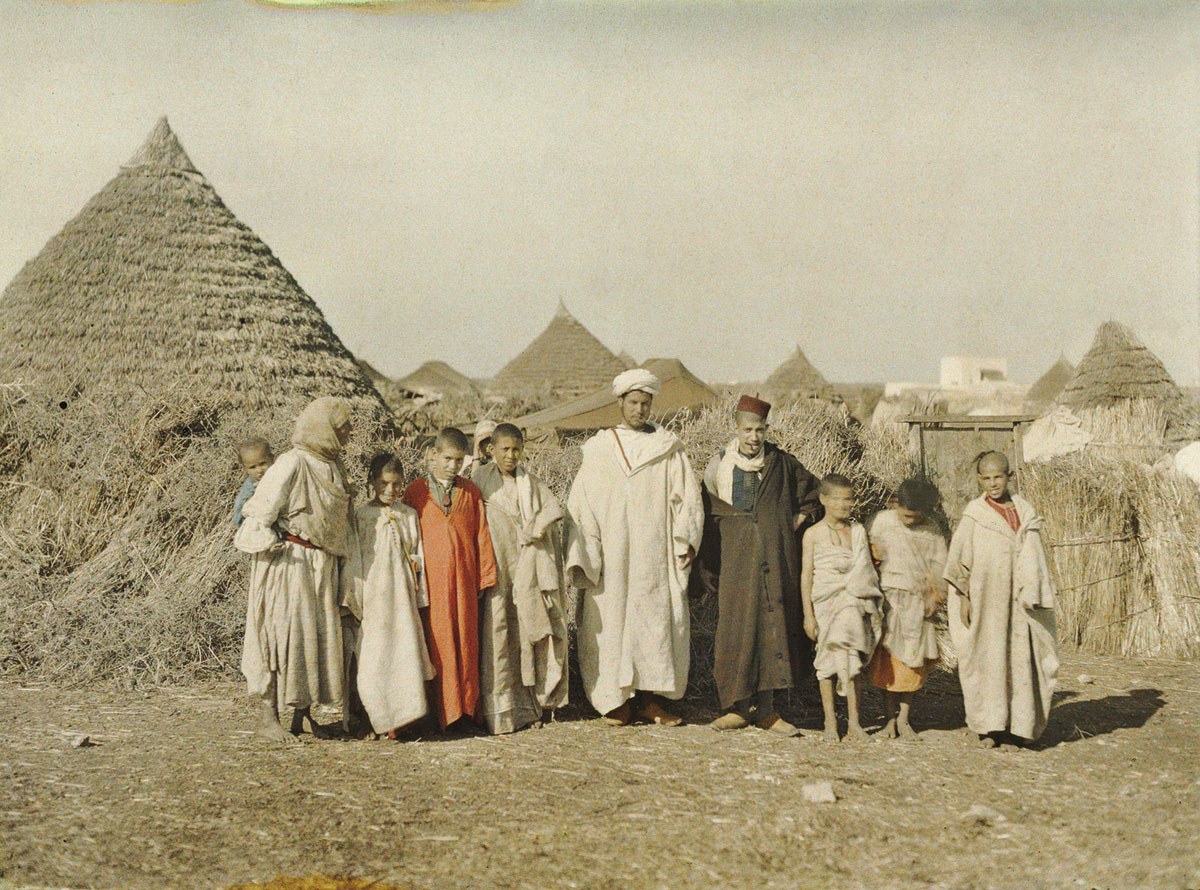
The Benguerir vicinity and local inhabitants in 1912–1913 (colorized).

The water source of the original souk was absorbed into the railway grounds in the early 20th century to build a water tower servicing the stations and early municipal offices. The town was documented in French Protectorate writings. Benguerir developed as a regional rail stop following the expansion of Morocco's standard-gauge network, with the final rail junction connecting Casablanca to Marrakesh completed through the town in 1928. In 1936, the Compagnie des Chemins de Fer du Maroc completed the standard-gauge railway line branching west from Benguerir to the port of Safi, transforming the town into a junction.

=== Post-independence ===
Following the French Protectorate's exile of Sultan Muhammad V in August 1953, Caid El-Ayyadi broke with French authorities to support the Sultan's legitimacy, leading to his dismissal, temporary exile to France, and house arrest in Casablanca. After Morocco's independence in 1956, he lived in political retirement for eight years while selling off his heavily mortgaged estates until his death on 12 January 1964 at age 84.

From the 1930s through the mid-20th century, local landowner Mohamed Belmahjoub Lahmadi (1900–1978), who settled in Hay Ezzaouia in 1930 after relocating from Labrikiyne, operated the town's sole flour mill on the site of present-day Sahat El Wahda and held extensive tracts that were subsequently subdivided to form much of the Hay El Jadid quarter. In February 2017, the heirs of the Al Lahmadi Belmahjoub family donated a parcel of urban land to the Benguerir municipal council to enable the construction of a public swimming pool. Land for the OCP-funded ecological park and corniche along Oued Bouchane, inaugurated in August 2018, was similarly provided by the Belmahjoub heirs, following a 2017 municipal land-transfer agreement covering the stretch near the retention basin.

The American air base at Benguerir, constructed in the early 1950s as a United States Strategic Air Command facility, was formally handed over to the Moroccan government in June 1963 following negotiations between King Hassan II and U.S. President John F. Kennedy. Between July 1988 and June 2002, the Ben Guerir Air Base served as a designated NASA Space Shuttle Transoceanic Abort Landing (TAL) weather-alternate site (replacing Casablanca) and supported 83 Space Shuttle missions (concluding with STS-111) before being decommissioned.

From the 1970s until 1992, Benguerir was administered as a rural commune led by the Popular Movement under council president El-Hajj Kabbour Ech-Chaibi. This period was characterized by low municipal revenues, a shortage of administrative staff, the absence of structured infrastructure programming, and the lack of a dedicated municipal headquarters. In 1992, Benguerir was elevated to an urban municipality, and Fouad Ali El Himma was elected as an independent to lead the council from 1992 to 1997, initiating staff quality-training circles, municipal festivals, investor outreach, and regional development studies until his 1997 appointment to the Crown Prince's cabinet. Between 1997 and 2003, the Ech-Chaibi family regained control of the municipal council until a forged-list judicial ruling ended the Popular Movement's local dominance in 2003. A subsequent coalition led by Mohamed El-Ayyadi of the National Rally of Independents (RNI) governed the municipality.

Following the 2009 municipal elections (coinciding with the creation of Rehamna Province) the Authenticity and Modernity Party won control of the municipal council, launching city-wide urban restructuring via a master development plan financed by rising municipal revenues and municipal borrowing, alongside an expansion of annual civil society subsidies up to roughly 3 million MAD.

In June 2011, the Court of First Instance in Benguerir sentenced Mohammed El-Ayyadi to six months in prison, a 50,000 MAD fine, and a two-term ban from running for office for vote-buying during the 2007 elections; however, the Court of cassation later annulled the prison sentence while upholding the two-term ban on political office. Alongside his predecessor Mohamed Ech-Chaibi, El Ayyadi was referred to the Marrakesh Court of Appeal over the allegedly illegal leasing of Benguerir's weekly market and the Al Qods municipal-employees housing subdivision affair, facing felony charges of embezzling public funds and influence peddling; after being acquitted at first instance, the prosecution appealed to the Criminal Appeals Chamber in February 2015. Although El Ayyadi retained seats on both the Benguerir Municipal Council and the Rehamna Provincial Council during the 2009–2015 and 2015–2021 terms, he did not attend council sessions or committee meetings for roughly a decade before formally resigning from both bodies on 15 November 2019.

== Infrastructure ==
=== Healthcare ===
Public healthcare in Benguerir is provided by the existing Provincial Rehamna Hospital (which lacked an intensive care unit as of 2020) and neighborhood primary health centers (Arabic: مركز صحي), including El Taqaddoum and Ifriquia 1.

A new three-story, 120-bed Provincial Hospital Center is under construction on a 6-hectare (0.023 sq mi) OCP-owned site along National Route 9 at the southern exit of Benguerir. It was initially budgeted at 470 million MAD in 2022 with 40 maternity/neonatology, 30 general medicine, 30 surgery, 10 pediatrics, and 10 intensive care beds. Its total cost reached 604 million MAD at 85% physical completion by October 2026.

Private and foundation-operated secondary and tertiary care in Benguerir includes the Private Rehamna Clinic (Arabic: مصحة الرحامنة الخاصة) (opened in February 2023), the Multidisciplinary Benguerir Hospital (operated by the Sheikh Zaid Foundation), the UM6P Smart Health Care City (SHCC), and the International Oncology Center of Benguerir (operated by Akdital within the Green City's Health Care City).

=== Transportation ===
==== Rail ====
The Benguerir railway station in November 2026.

The Benguerir railway station links the city to the rest of the Moroccan rail network, with trains running daily to all other major cities including a direct line to Safi through Youssoufia, another phosphate-rich town. In the framework of the Kenitra–Marrakesh high speed rail line, a new "Benguerir Green City" train station is planned for construction, but the first call for tender was unsuccessful due to a lack of bidders, in part caused by a deficit in workforce and a rapid increase of ongoing construction projects. Benguerir is also planned to be linked to the future regional train network of the Rehamna region. The train station was rebuilt in 2018 next to the smaller existing one.

==== Road ====
The main exit from Benguerir towards the Casablanca–Agadir expressway and Regional Road 206.

Benguerir is linked to the Casablanca–Agadir A3 Highway. It possesses a dedicated interchange and bilateral highway service areas operated under Autoroutes du Maroc (ADM).

Despite its rapid demographic growth and role as a crossroads between Marrakesh, Settat, Youssoufia, and Kalaat Sraghna, Benguerir lacks an intercity bus station. In May 2017, urban transit operator Alsa launched peri-urban Bus Line 38 connecting Marrakesh directly to central Benguerir at a fare of 18 MAD cash (15 MAD with an Ikhlass smartcard), introducing low-cost public bus competition against intercity shared taxis.

Everyday intracity public transit in Benguerir relies on "Category 2" small taxis, supplemented by "Category 1" shared intercity taxis, rural dual-transport vans, and traditional horse-drawn carriages.

== Demographics ==
According to the 2024 Moroccan Census, Benguerir has a population of 114,872 people, comprising 27,167 households, with the average household size at 4.2 people. 28.7% of the city's population is under 15 years old.

Benguerir Population
Year	2004	2014	2024
Pop.	62,693	88,626	114,872
±% p.a.	—	+3.52%	+2.63%
Census data from 2004, 2014 and 2024

As of the 2024 Moroccan census, the illiteracy rate stands at 20.6% (13.9% for males and 26.3% for females), down from 27.62% in 2014, and the schooling rate for children age 6–11 years old is 97%. 25.4% of the literate population can read and write in Arabic (Modern Standard Arabic), French and English, 38.9% can read and write in Arabic and French, and the remaining 33.4% can only read and write in Arabic. Only 3.2% of the population has Amazigh (Berber) as its native language, compared to 96.7% for Arabic. The unemployment rate is 20.3%, and the activity rate stands at 44.5% compared to 47.39% ten years prior (in 2014).

== Education ==
=== Primary and secondary education ===
The urban municipality of Benguerir under the Provincial Directorate of Rehamna comprises, as of 2026, 45 registered primary and secondary educational institutions, divided into 27 public schools and 18 private establishments.

As of 2026, public primary education in Benguerir is delivered across 15 public elementary schools. Public lower secondary education (Arabic: التعليم التأهيلي الإعدادي) in the municipality is provided by 7 public middle schools, and public upper secondary education (Arabic: التعليم التأهيلي الثانوي) is delivered by 5 public high schools.

The Lydex main access.

A view of the Lydex campus.

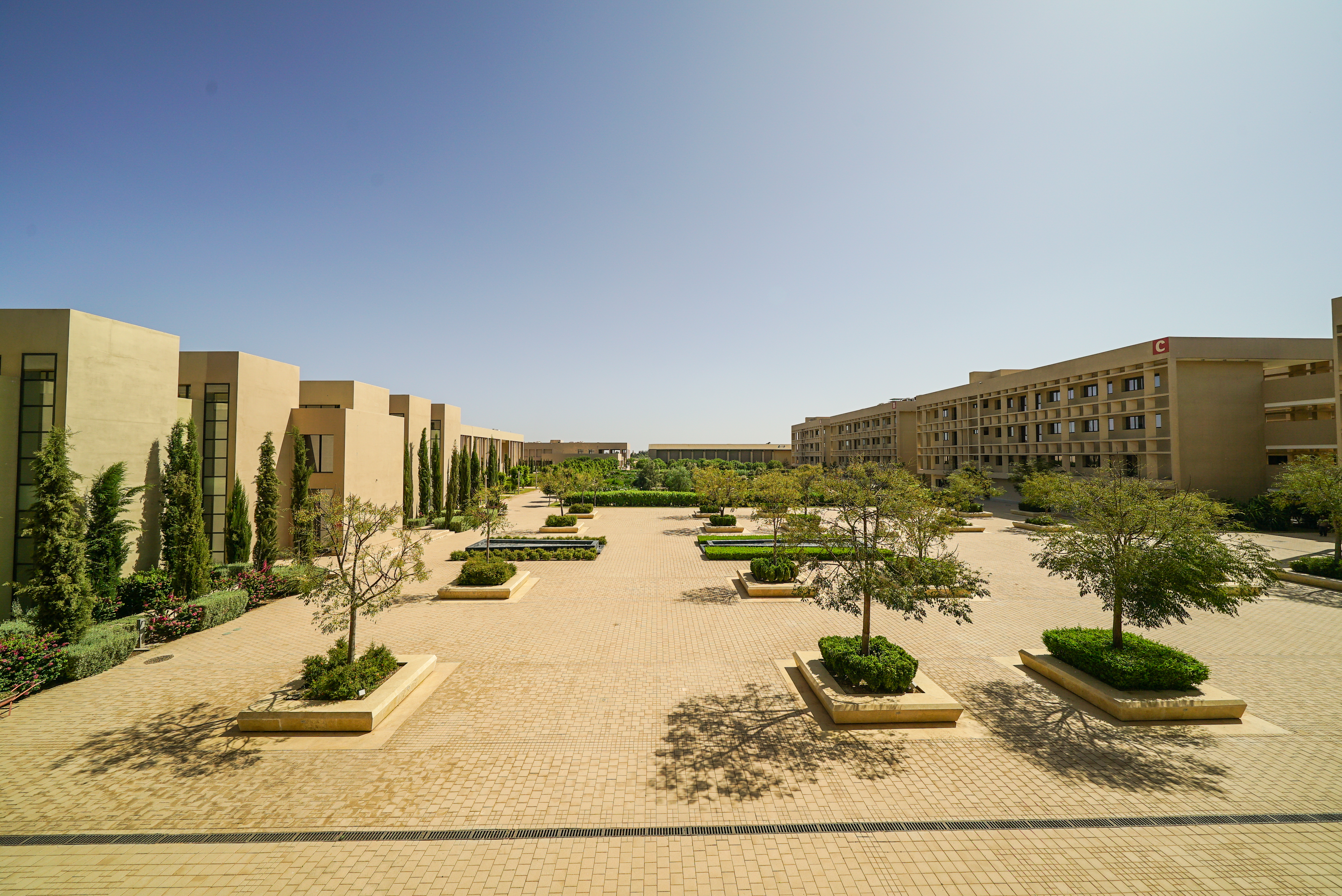
Buildings and plaza in the Lydex campus.

The Lycée Mohammed VI d'Excellence (Lydex), opened in 2015 by the OCP Foundation, is a selective STEM residential secondary school and preparatory college (French: Classes Préparatoires aux Grandes Écoles, CPGE) known for high student admission rates to French Grandes Écoles, including École Polytechnique and Moroccan national engineering schools.

French-curriculum international primary education was introduced to the city in September 2024 with the opening of an annex of École Jacques-Majorelle in partnership with UM6P and the Mission Laïque Française.

=== Vocational training ===
Benguerir hosts a campus of the 1337 Coding School, a tuition-free peer-to-peer coding academy established in 2018 as part of the international 42 Network, funded by OCP Group to provide alternative programming and software development training.

=== Higher education ===
==== University Mohammed VI Polytechnic ====
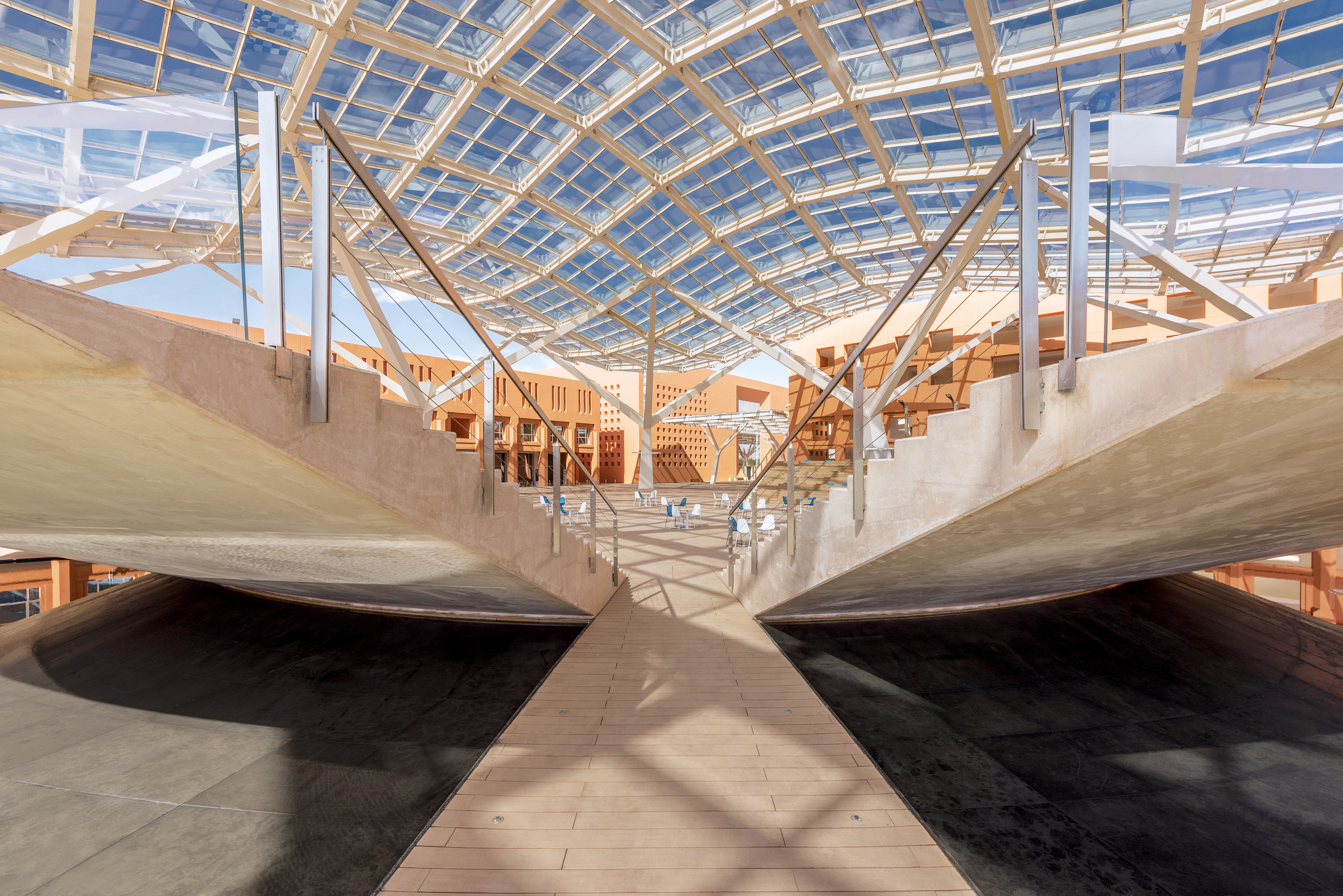
The UM6P Benguerir campus in 2020.

The 2017 Auditorium at UM6P.

UM6P buildings and parks in 2026.

Modern mid-rise building (SBHM School).

Benguerir is home to University Mohammed VI Polytechnic (UM6P), a major institution focusing on research, innovation, and sustainable development. The university played a central role in the city’s transformation into a knowledge and technology hub. UM6P hosts specialized institutes in industrial management, agricultural science, and renewable energy, collaborating with the adjacent Green Energy Park (GEP) testing facility.

UM6P operates as a private research university funded by OCP Group with international academic partnerships (MIT, EPFL, Columbia). At least two-thirds of its student body receive scholarships, including many students from low-income backgrounds.

==== Proposed Rehamna University Nucleus ====
The Ministry of Higher Education and Cadi Ayyad University announced plans in 2021 to establish a public Faculty of Applied Sciences in Benguerir to expand open-access public higher education in Rehamna Province. Due to the continued absence of a public university campus in the province, which forces regular baccalaureate holders who do not attend private or selective schools to commute to Marrakesh, a proposed "Rehamna University Nucleus" (Arabic: النواة الجامعية بالرحامنة) became a recurring subject of parliamentary questions to the Minister of Higher Education.

In December 2024, Benguerir was officially recognized as a UNESCO Learning City for its efforts in promoting inclusive education, lifelong learning, and sustainable urban development.

== Economy ==
Benguerir's economy is centered around phosphate mining and the Mohammed VI Green City project, which hosts University Mohammed VI Polytechnic and other major Moroccan educational institutions. Historically, as it was situated astride National Route 9 (RN9) connecting Casablanca and Marrakesh, the city's local service economy, which grew along the Mohammed V Avenue, depended heavily on transit travelers stopping for roadside cafes, butcher shops, and traditional grilled liver skewers. The launch of the Casablanca–Marrakesh expressway in 2008 hurt the city's economy, causing commercial revenues along the Mohammed V Avenue to drop to 30% of their original levels, forcing the permanent closure of 18 cafes/restaurants and 22 retail shops, and resulting in the loss of approximately 1,200 direct jobs.

=== Phosphate mining ===
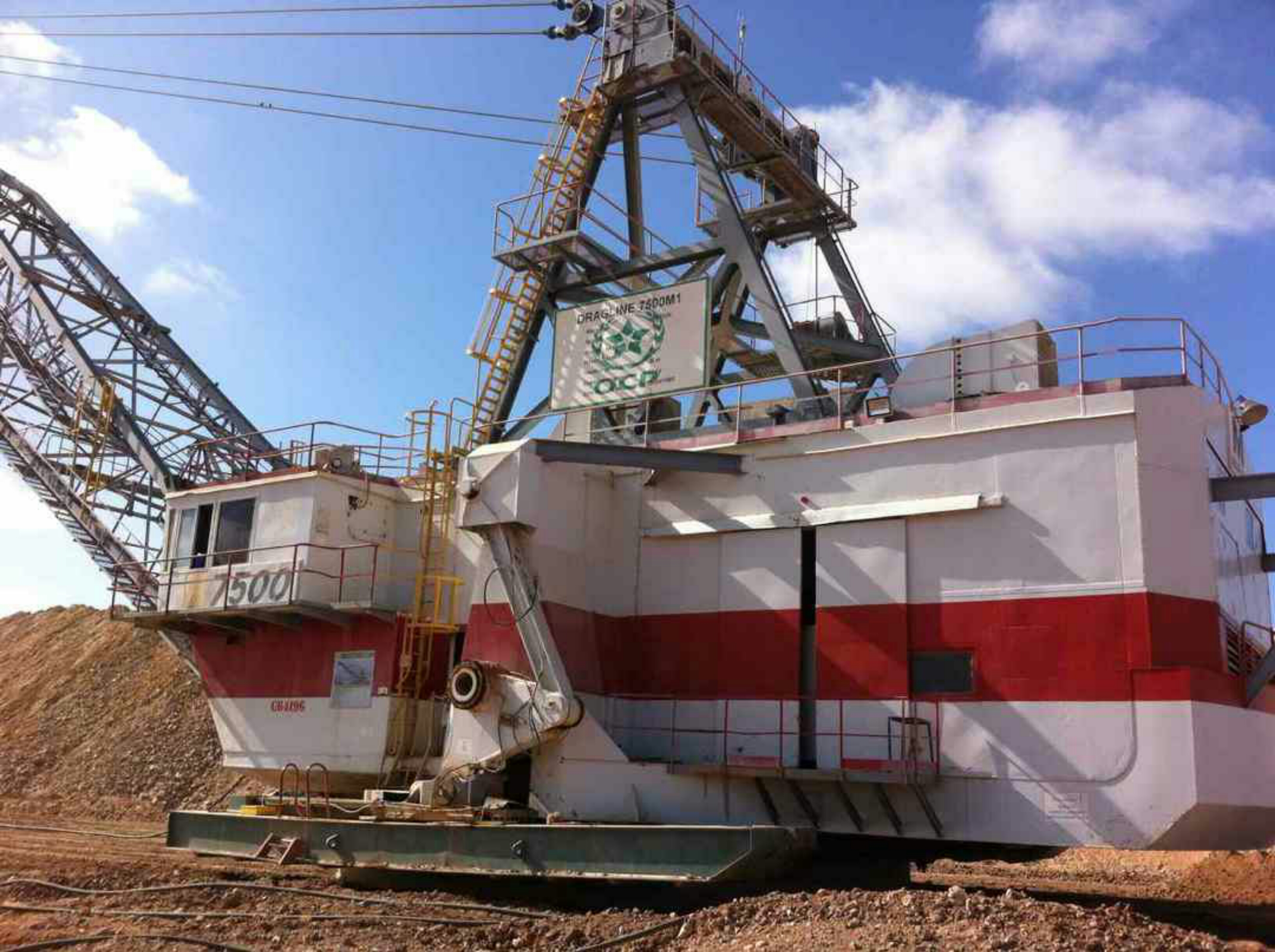
A dragline track used in the Benguerir phosphate mine by OCP.

The city is a major center for the extraction and processing of phosphate rock, primarily operated by the OCP Group, one of the world's largest phosphate exporters. The Benguerir mine, whose construction works began in 1974 and entered production in 1980, is the second largest phosphate deposit currently exploited by OCP Group in Morocco.

It contains estimated reserves of over 1.74 billion tons of phosphate rock distributed between the North Mine and the South Mine, and it is exploited entirely through open-pit mining using the direct discovery method with giant draglines and hydraulic excavators. The extracted ore is processed and enriched on site at the Benguerir washing plant, which has a capacity of 3 million tons per year, before being transported by rail (ONCF) to the chemical platform and the export port of Safi.

=== Mohammed VI Green City ===
OCP has spearheaded efforts to develop Benguerir into a model green city, integrating sustainable urban planning and environmental practices, through the Mohammed VI Green City project (also referred to as the Benguerir Green City). The Mohammed VI Green City project was officially initiated in December 2009 by King Mohammed VI as part of OCP Group's regional development initiatives, but works on the city were started in June 2008. The pilot ecological city achieved certification under the international LEED-ND (Leadership in Energy and Environmental Design for Neighborhood Development) pilot system, making it the first urban-scale development to obtain this designation in Africa. The Green City is legally situated within the municipal boundaries of the Commune of Benguerir. Its zoning master plan was formally approved by local and provincial planning authorities in 2012.

The main road of the Mohammed VI Green City, linking between the Benguerir core and Hay Moulay Rachid.

The development and management of the master plan were delegated to the SADV (French: Société d'Aménagement et de Développement Vert, lit. 'Green Planning and Development Company'), a public limited subsidiary fully owned by OCP S.A. with an initial share capital of 165 million MAD.

UM6P viewed from the main road of the Green City.

The initial governmental decree approving the project estimated total expenditure at 4.70 billion MAD, allocated across land acquisition, site servicing, basic infrastructure, and technical studies. The master plan envisions accommodating approximately 90,000 residents across roughly 23,000 mixed housing units over an urban footprint of 900–1,000 ha (3.5–3.9 sq mi), originally announced to cover a 1,700 ha (6.6 sq mi) surface area. A 4-kilometre landscaped ecological corridor named the Green corridor (French: Coulée Verte), spanning 80 hectares with an afforestation program of 50,000 trees across five oasis nodes, was designed to link the new urban extension with historic Benguerir. To prevent depletion of local groundwater reserves in an arid region, the irrigation of public parks and green spaces across the Green City is partially supplied by treated municipal effluent from the Benguerir wastewater treatment plant, which also produces biogas used for electricity production (which supplies about a third of the plant's electricity needs).

University Mohammed VI Polytechnic (UM6P) forms the central institutional anchor of the city and was formally inaugurated by King Mohammed VI on 12 January 2017. The urban campus of Mohammed VI Polytechnic University was designed through a collaboration between Spanish Catalan architect Ricardo Bofill (RBTA) and Moroccan architect Elie Mouyal.

In 2026, the green corridor of Benguerir was set to undergo a transformation along a new section of its route, for a budget of approximately 22.5 million dirhams, as part of a 2024-2027 urban renewal and development program. Planned work includes landscaping, the creation and expansion of parking lots, sewer and stormwater drainage systems, new road markings and traffic signs, recreational areas, public restrooms, street furniture among other amenities, and improved solar-powered LED panels.

Academic studies examine the lack of organic urban and socioeconomic integration between the "historic" Benguerir and the Green City. The historic part of Benguerir has been described as being "thirty years behind". Urban geography scholarship critiques the corporate marketing of the project as potential greenwashing, noting the high maintenance costs of lush greenery and risks of territorial autarky in an arid climate.

Pictures of the Mohammed VI Green City
Buildings under construction in the Mohammed VI Green City area.

Modern medium-rise buildings at the UM6P Campus.

The Benguerir Business Center viewed from the UM6P Campus (on foot).

The area near the Benguerir Business Center and the Hampton Hotel viewed from the UM6P Campus.

=== Industrial Acceleration Zone ===
A ZAI (French: Zone d'Accélération Industrielle, lit. 'Industrial Acceleration Zone') of 138 ha (0.53 sq mi) was created in the commune of Oulad Hassoune Hamri, near Benguerir, through a government decree in March 2025 with the objective of generating 12,000 jobs (5,000 direct and 7,000 indirect) in green industries, agri-food and logistics.

== Governance ==
Benguerir is the administrative capital of the Province of Rehamna, which was established by government decree in June 2009 through the partition of territories previously belonging to Kalaat Sraghna Province. As province capital, the city hosts the provincial headquarters of Rehamna (Arabic: عمالة إقليم الرحامنة), headed by the province's Governor Aziz Bouigane as of 2026.

The municipal council of Benguerir consists of 29 elected members. On 11 November 2024, retired natural sciences teacher Abdellatif Ouardi (Authenticity and Modernity Party) was elected mayor with 22 of 29 votes following an administrative court ruling dismissing his predecessor, alongside six deputy mayors from RNI, PJD, Al-Inssaf, and PPS.

Under a new urban administrative reorganization adopted in August 2026 to accommodate urban expansion, Benguerir is divided into four administrative annexes (Arabic: ملحقات إدارية): Al Massira, Ar-Riyad, Al Amal, and the Green City Annex.

== Culture ==
=== Institutions and events ===
The Integrated Handicraft Complex of Benguerir.

Benguerir is home to the Cultural Centre of Benguerir (Arabic: المركز الثقافي ابن جرير), which features dedicated spaces for music, fine arts, a library. Its construction began in 2009 and took over a decade for a planned opening in late 2021-2022. In July 2025, it was incorporated into a national Ministry of Youth, Culture and Communication project to equip cinema projection halls across cultural centers in Morocco.

The Space of Historical Memory of Resistance and Liberation (Arabic: فضاء الذاكرة التاريخية للمقاومة والتحرير) was inaugurated in August 2016 by the High Commission for Former Resistance Fighters. It houses an exhibition gallery of historical documents, manuscripts, photographs, and anti-colonial artifacts, along with a library and multimedia room.

Youth cultural and associative activities are hosted at municipal youth centers (Arabic: دار الشباب), including the historic Al Qods Youth Center (Arabic: دار الشباب القدس) and the newer Hay Chouaibat Youth Center (Arabic: دار الشباب حي الشعيبات) inaugurated in August 2018.

Benguerir serves as the host city for the Rehamna Festival for Cultural and Touristic Heritage, whose eighth edition was held in December 2024.

=== In popular culture ===
In Moroccan popular culture, Benguerir was historically associated with its semi-arid climate, chalk dust, and transit stops along National Route 9. Its aesthetic was described as being "spaghetti-western". A popular 1960s folk song lamented the town's post-colonial decline following the era of Caid El-Hajj El-Ayyadi ben El-Hachemi with the adage "Where are your days, O Benguerir... nothing but dust and flying lime" (Moroccan Arabic: فين يومك أبن جرير .. غير الغبرة والجير يطير). Benguerir entered contemporary national broadcast comedy through recurring sketches on national public television.

== Sports ==
=== Football ===
Benguerir's municipal football ground was upgraded with an artificial turf playing field, stadium fencing, grandstand restoration, and renovated team dressing rooms. In November 2026, an outdoor "FIFA Arena" youth sports facility was inaugurated in Benguerir alongside the opening of the FIFA Arena Kids Cup tournament.

=== Athletics ===
The Benguerir Athletes Training Center.

Benguerir is home to established athletics clubs, including Athletics Chabab Ben Guerir (Arabic: نادي شباب ابن جرير لألعاب القوى), which take part in national track-and-field and cross-country meets.

Benguerir has an Athletes Training Center (Arabic: مركز تكوين العدائين), which features a competition athletics track that hosts major national events, such as the 3rd Federal Athletics Meeting in April 2018 (870 athletes from 121 Moroccan clubs). It was built under the National Human Development Initiative.

=== Other sports ===
The Benguerir Indoor Omnisports Hall.

Benguerir's municipal indoor omnisports hall (Arabic: القاعة المغطاة للرياضات) hosts indoor sports competitions and club training; built under local development programs, local press reported in March 2026 that its roof had suffered structural deterioration and water leaks requiring urgent rehabilitation.

Construction began in January 2018 on a 3,000 m^{2} (32,000 sq ft) municipal semi-olympic swimming pool in Hay El Majd (Arabic: المسبح النصف أولمبي بحي المجد), featuring an 8-lane pool and 300-seat spectator stands at a cost of 3.695 million MAD co-funded by the Municipality, INDH, and the Ministry of Youth and Sports.

== Military ==
Benguerir hosts the Ben Guerir Air Base, currently operated by the Royal Moroccan Air Force. It previously served as a United States Air Force base until 1963, and a Transoceanic Abort Landing (TAL) site for the Space Shuttle between 1988 and 2002.

== Notable people ==
- El-Hajj El-Ayyadi ben El-Hachemi – Born in 1880 in Rehamna and died on 12 January 1964, governed the Rehamna tribes from his fortified residence (Arabic: دار القائد) in Benguerir under Sultan Abd al-Hafid and the French Protectorate.
- Fouad Ali El Himma – Moroccan politician and Royal Counselor to King Mohammed VI (since December 2011); originating from Rehamna, he served two tenures as President of the Municipal Council (Mayor) of Benguerir (1992–1997 and June 2009–December 2011), represented Rehamna in Parliament (1995–1997 and 2007–2011), and founded the Rhamna (Note: "Rhamna" is the official spelling used by the foundation.) Foundation for Sustainable Development.
- Bouchaib Arroub – Moroccan Army General who served as Inspector General of the Royal Armed Forces and Commander of the Southern Zone (2014–2017). Early in his military career, he served in 1966 as commander of the Ben Guerir Air Base.
- Fatiha Layadi – Journalist, politician, and granddaughter of Caid El-Ayyadi. Born in Rehamna, she served as a Parliamentary Deputy representing the Rehamna constituency (elected in 2007 and 2011) before being appointed by King Mohammed VI in October 2024 as Morocco's Ambassador to Denmark.
- Hicham El Habti – Engineer and academic administrator who has served as President of Mohammed VI Polytechnic University (UM6P) in Benguerir since October 2020 and General Secretary of OCP Group since September 2026.
- Youssef Tourabi – Moroccan footballer born in 1989 in Benguerir who played as a defender for Moghreb Tétouan.

== See also ==
- OCP Group
- University Mohammed VI Polytechnic
- Ben Guerir Air Base
