= 1337 Coding School =

Moroccan computer science institution

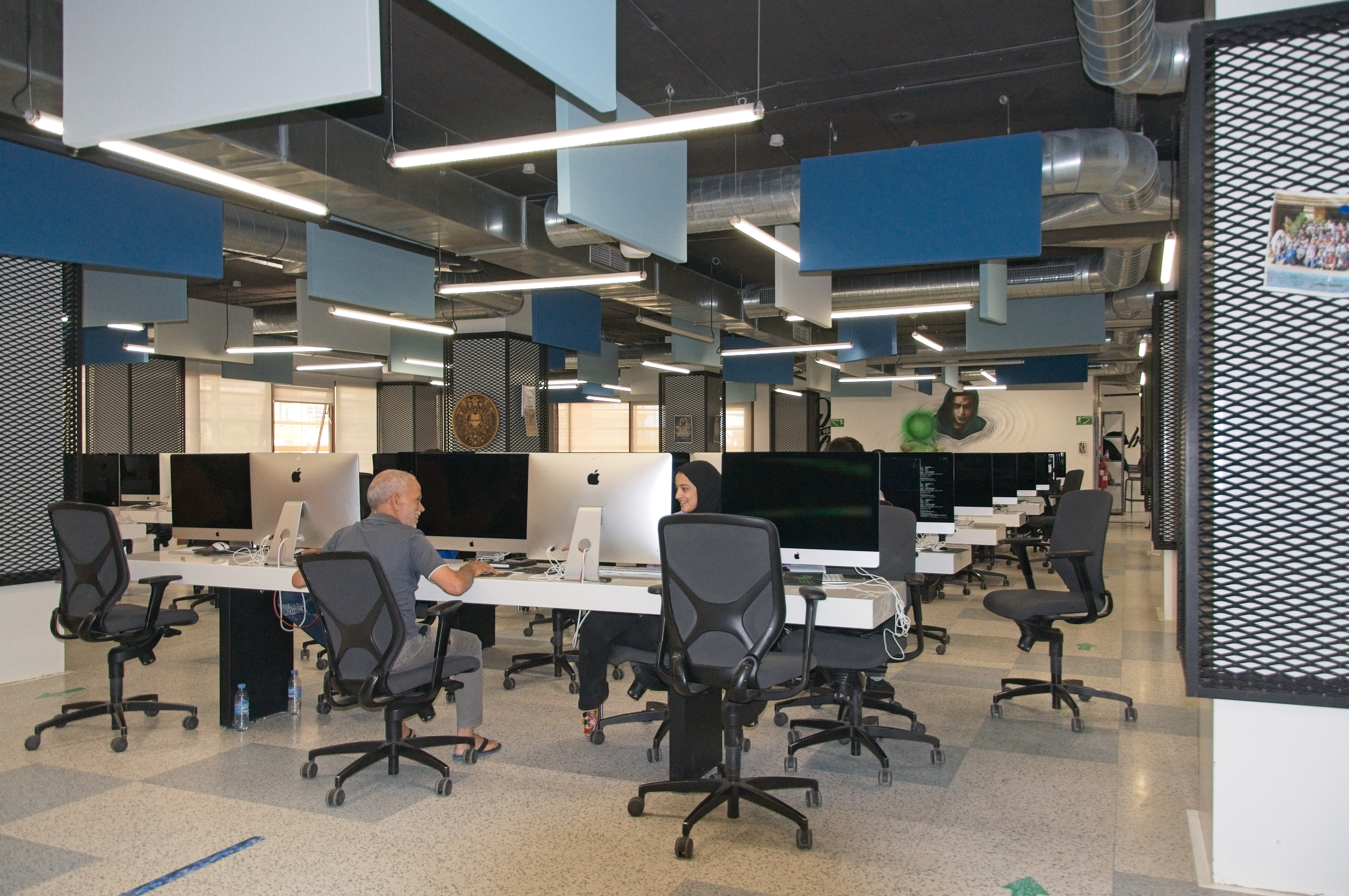
- Established: 2018; 8 years ago
- Founder: OCP Group
- Parent institution: University Mohammed VI Polytechnic
- Director: Larbi El Hilali
- Location: Morocco
- Campus: Khouribga; Benguerir; Tetouan; Rabat
- Website: 1337.ma
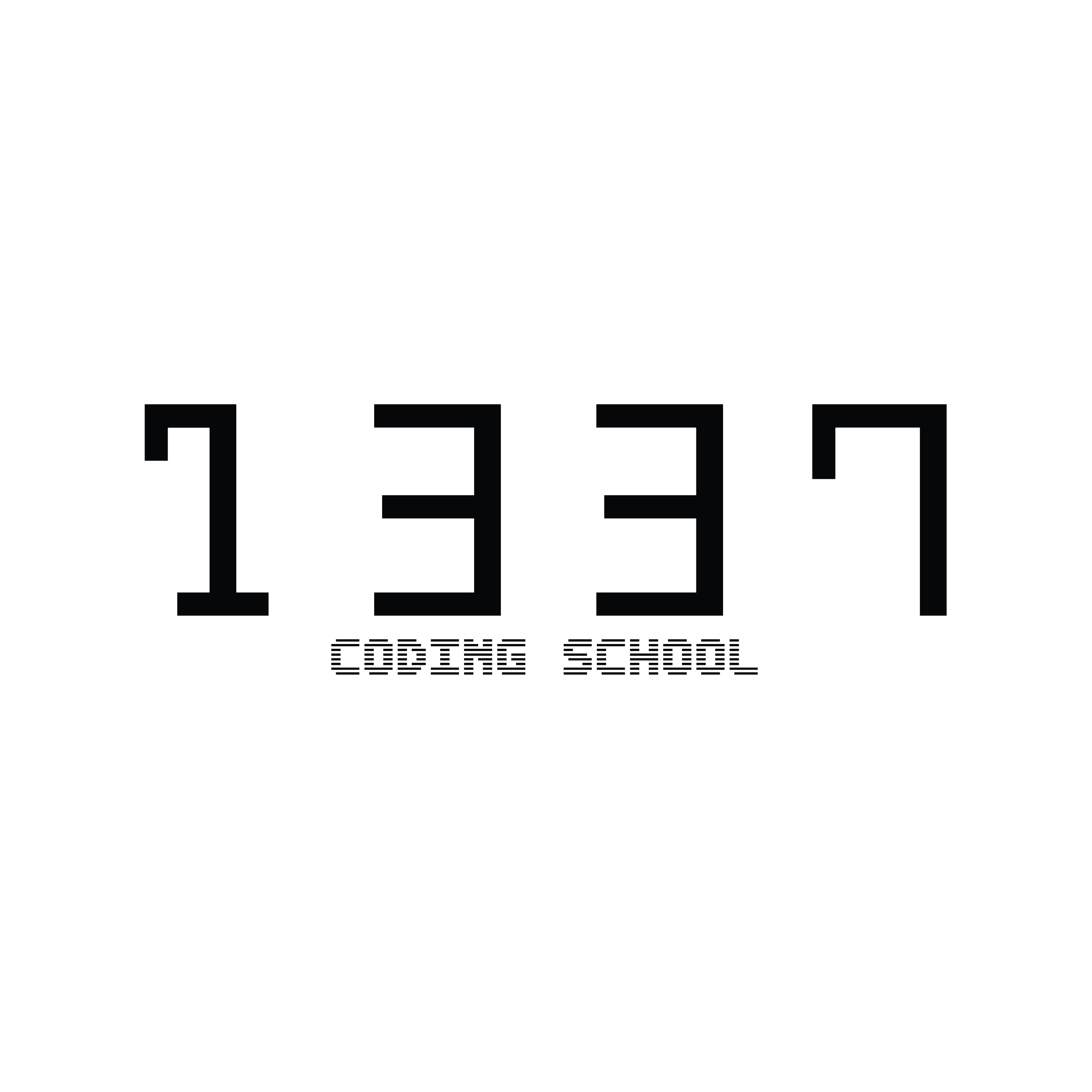

1337 Coding School is the school of digital science of the University Mohammed VI Polytechnic (UM6P). It provides training in computer science and computer programming through a project-based and peer-to-peer learning model inspired by the French school 42. The school is governed by the OCP Group and was founded in 2018 in Khouribga.

It is characterized by free tuition, the absence of formal academic requirements for admission, and an atypical pedagogical approach centered on autonomy, collaboration, and intensive practical learning reflecting a founding philosophy that places aptitude and potential above diploma, background, or social origin.

== History ==
The project was launched in 2018 in a context marked by the development of digital skills in Morocco and the diversification of educational pathways in computer science. The first campus opened in Khouribga, in a rehabilitated site originating from local industrial heritage.

A second campus was inaugurated in 2019 in Benguerir, within the ecosystem of University Mohammed VI Polytechnic (UM6P), in order to increase capacity. The same year, the institution joined the international 42 Network.

A third campus, named 1337 Med, opened in Tetouan in 2022, in the Tetouan Shore zone, in partnership with the Tanger Med Foundation and UM6P.

In 2023, students from 1337 Coding School participated in Reddit's collaborative r/place event. According to Le Desk, the Moroccan flag and map displayed on the final canvas were created by the school as part of Morocco's collective participation.

== Etymology ==
The school's name, "1337", derives from "leet" (also written "1337" or "31337"), an internet and hacker slang term originating from "Elite". The number is written using leetspeak, where letters are replaced by visually similar numerals. According to the school, the name reflects its connection to programming/hackers culture.

== Organization and pedagogy ==
The pedagogical model of 1337 is inspired by that of the 42 school. It is based on self-learning, peer learning, and project-based work, without traditional lectures or a conventional academic structure.

Admission is open without formal academic requirements, based on selection tests followed by an intensive immersion phase known as the “pool” (piscine), during which candidates are evaluated on their learning abilities and problem-solving skills.

== Curriculum ==
The curriculum at 1337 Coding School is divided into three main phases: a common core, an internship period, and an advanced curriculum.

The common core generally lasts between 1.5 and 2 years. During this phase, students complete the same foundational projects and evaluations covering programming, algorithms, computer science, systems administration, software engineering, and collaborative problem-solving. The phase also includes several examinations.

After completing the common core, students undertake a mandatory internship lasting between four and six months, allowing them to gain professional experience before entering the advanced curriculum.

The advanced curriculum can last from 1 to 4.5 additional years depending on the student's pace and chosen specialization areas. During this phase, students may specialize in one or more fields including artificial intelligence, web development, game development, cybersecurity, DevOps, operating system and kernel development, compiler design, cryptography, and mathematics-related computing disciplines.

The pedagogical model is based on project-based and peer-to-peer learning inspired by the educational approach of the 42 Network.

== Student life ==
1337 provides free student accommodation and meal services across its campuses. At the Khouribga and Rabat campuses, students may access dormitory facilities affiliated with Mohammed VI Polytechnic University (UM6P). At the Tetouan and Benguerir campuses, eligible students may receive financial assistance for accommodation.

Accommodation and meal services, including breakfast, lunch, and dinner, are provided at no cost to eligible students. Access to accommodation, financial assistance, and meal services is subject to academic progression and participation requirements within the curriculum.

Students at the Benguerir, Khouribga, and Rabat campuses have access to sports facilities located on the UM6P campuses. Student life also includes a variety of student-run clubs and societies covering areas such as robotics, cybersecurity, competitive programming, entrepreneurship, design, music, and sports

== Competitions ==
Since 2023, 1337 Coding School has consistently ranked among the top institutions in the CodinGame programming challenges, international competitions held several times per year and involving more than 100 institutions worldwide .

In March 2026, the school achieved first place worldwide in the CodinGame Winter Challenge.

The school has also consistently ranked on the podium in Moroccan competitive programming competitions, including the Moroccan National Programming Contest (MNPC) and contests organized by other Moroccan engineering schools.

In 2025, 1337 won its first national championship at the MNPC.

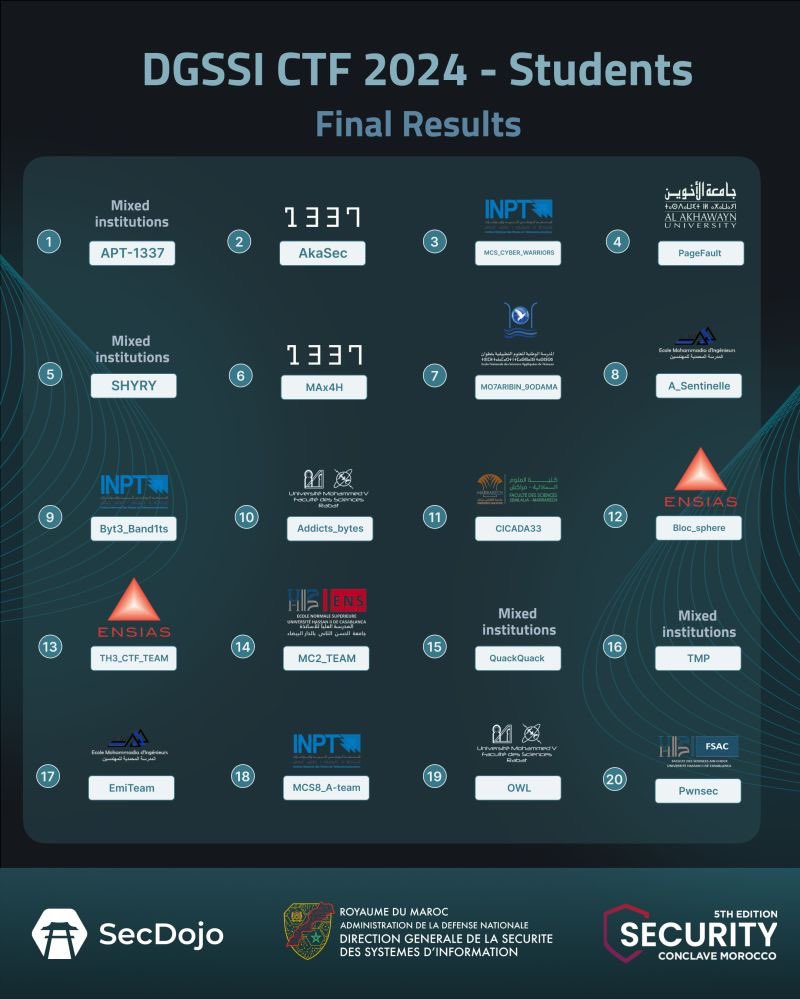
DGSSI CTF 2024

1337 students also achieved podium finishes in national cybersecurity competitions by Direction générale de la sécurité des systèmes d'information. In 2024, a team from the school obtained second place in a national cybersecurity competition involving Moroccan engineering and higher education institutions. The school's teams were also the highest-ranked in Morocco on CTFtime for three consecutive years (2023–2025).

In 2026, a team representing the school ranked second at the Morocco Academia Cyber Competition (MACC), a cybersecurity competition bringing together 1,156 teams from more than 150 higher education institutions and engineering schools.

Each year, the Khouribga campus organizes CyberOdyssey, one of the largest Capture The Flag (CTF) cybersecurity competitions in Morocco. The event brings together around 20 of the top teams nationally and offers prizes exceeding US$21,000.

== Positioning ==
The 1337 School occupies an atypical position within the Moroccan higher education landscape and has been described by France 24 as "Morocco's Silicon Valley", distinguished by a pedagogy that is both non-conventional and deliberately inclusive. Its meritocratic admissions model makes no distinction between a candidate who never obtained a baccalaureate due to poverty or limited educational access, and one who holds a PhD or an engineering degree, no formal qualifications are required. Appearance and personal history are equally irrelevant candidates are evaluated solely on aptitude and potential, through logic and memory tests. In doing so, the school channels diverse talent toward software engineering and computer science, fields widely regarded as among the most transformative of the current era.

== Certification ==
Students at 1337 Coding School progress through a level-based system throughout the curriculum. The level reached by a student at the time of leaving the program determines the certificate awarded.

Students who complete the common core without pursuing a specialization may leave the school after reaching levels generally ranging from 10 to 12. Other students continue into the advanced curriculum and may complete higher levels depending on their progression and specialization path.

The school awards certificates associated with specific progression levels, including:

- Level 10: Junior Developer
- Level 13: Developer
- Level 16: Advanced Developer
- Level 19: Computer Scientist
- Level 21: Computer Architect

Students may complete the curriculum at different stages, and certification is based on the highest level attained within the program.

In addition to the internal certificates awarded by the school, students who meet specific academic and administrative requirements may obtain French Répertoire national des certifications professionnelles (RNCP) titles delivered through the 42 Network.

These titles include:

- Concepteur développeur de solutions informatiques (RNCP/EQF level 6), accessible from level 16 under additional conditions.
- Expert en architecture informatique (RNCP/EQF level 7), accessible from level 21 under additional conditions.

== See also ==
- 42 (school)
- University Mohammed VI Polytechnic
- OCP Group
