= 1337 (disambiguation) =

1337 may refer to:

- 1337 (number), a number in the thousands range

== Dates ==
- AD 1337 (MCCCXXXVII), a year of the Common Era (CE)
- 1337 BC, a year from the era Before the Common Era (BCE)

== Internet ==
- Leet, also known as 1337, a system of modified spelling used on the internet, stands for elite
- 1337x, a torrent and magnet link sharing site.

== Legislation ==
- United Nations Security Council Resolution 1337
- U.S. federal H.R. 1337, legalizing homebrewing

== Military ==
- No. 1337 Wing RAF Regiment, UK Royal Air Force unit
- USCGC Assateague (WPB-1337), U.S. Coast Guard cutter, pennant 1337

== Places ==
- 1337 Gerarda, a main-belt asteroid, 1337th asteroid registered
- NGC 1337, a spiral galaxy in Eridanus
- IC 1337, a spiral galaxy in Capricornus
- Road 1337, see List of Farm to Market Roads in Texas (1300–1399)

== Other uses ==
- 1337, a coding school in Morocco
- 1337 Magazine
- 1337 (character), a fictional character, a SPARTAN-II soldier from Halo Legends
- AT&T Model 1337, the first digital answering machine
- 1337-class train, used for the Valley Flyer
- 1337 engine, a conceptual rocket engine design to replace the Raptor engine used in SpaceX Starship
