= Mostafa Terrab =

Moroccan business executive

- Born: 19 October 1955 (age 71); Fez, Fès-Meknès, Morocco
- Occupation: Chair of the OCP Group
- Years active: 1989–present

Mostafa Terrab (Arabic: مصطفى الترّاب; born 19 October 1955 in Fez) is a Moroccan business executive. He has served as chairman and chief executive officer of the state-owned phosphate company OCP Group since 2006.

In 2019, Terrab was elected president of the International Fertilizer Association. Earlier in his career, he was an adviser to King Hassan II and a member of the G14 policy think tank, which included figures such as Taieb Fassi-Fihri and Driss Jettou.

== Biography ==
=== Education ===
Mostafa Terrab graduated in engineering from the Ecole Nationale des Ponts et Chaussées in France in 1979, and went on to complete a Masters in Engineering in 1982 at the Massachusetts Institute of Technology (MIT) after which he pursued a PhD in Operations Research at the same institution. His Doctorate was awarded in 1990.

=== Teaching ===
While studying for his PhD, Terrab held the position of Assistant Professor and Researcher. He was a professor in the departments of decision sciences and engineering systems, and civil and environmental engineering at the Rensselaer Polytechnic Institute in Troy, New York from 1990 to 1992.

=== Career ===
Returning to Morocco in 1992, Terrab was appointed Chargé de Mission to the Royal Cabinet of the late King Hassan II before joining in 1995, as Secretary General, the Executive Secretariat of the Economic Summit for the Middle East and North Africa.

From 1998, he led the National Agency for Telecommunications Regulation (ANRT), before joining The World Bank as Lead Regulatory Specialist, where he directed the "Information for Development" (InfoDev) program for the support of entrepreneurs with strong growth in emerging economies.

Terrab was appointed chief executive officer of OCP in 2006, and then chairman and chief executive officer of the OCP Group when it became a Public Limited Company in June 2008. He is also Chairman of the University Mohammed VI Polytechnic.

In June 2019, Terrab became President of the IFA (International Fertilizer Association), a global organization bringing together 480 members of the fertilizer industry in 68 countries. He is the first African executive to chair this Association, and is also a member of the executive board.

In late 2019, Terrab was appointed to a 35-member committee for Moroccan Development, made up of a diverse cross-section of the most respected people in Morocco. The committee will deliver a report to King Mohammed VI on the impacts of the reform programs initiated in the Kingdom, across education, society, environment, infrastructure and the economy. The report will also deliver recommendations on best practice and future initiatives.

== Other activities ==
- French Institute of International Relations (IFRI), Member of the board of directors

== Personal life ==
Terrab is married and the father of three children.

== Awards and honours ==
In 1998, he received the Frederick C. Hennie III prize for his contribution to the MIT's Department of Electrical Engineering & Computer Science teaching programme. In 2012, Morocco World News named him Person of the Year for his contributions to the "most vital" sector of the Moroccan economy. He was named one of the 100 most influential Africans by New African Magazine in 2013 and one of the 50 most influential Africans worldwide by Jeune Afrique Magazine in 2014.
