= OCP Group =

Moroccan state-owned phosphate company

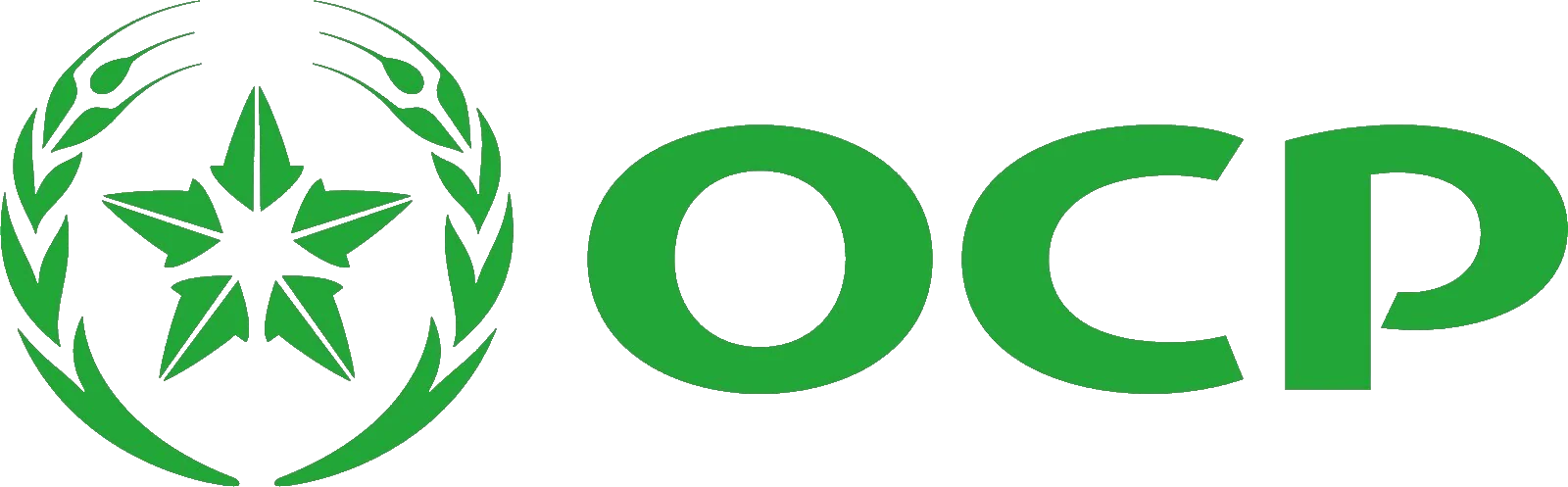
- Industry: Phosphates, Chemicals
- Founded: August 7, 1920; 106 years ago
- Headquarters: Casablanca, Morocco
- Key people: Mostafa Terrab (Chairman)
- Revenue: ▲US$11 billion (2022)
- Net income: ▲US$1.6 billion dollars (2022)
- Owner: Moroccan State (94.12%); Banque Populaire (5.88%)
- Number of employees: ≈ 32,000
- Subsidiaries: Mining & processing Phosboucraâ; Prayon; Euro Maroc Phosphore; Jorf Fertilizer Company; Zuari Maroc Phosphates Private Limited; Indo Maroc Phosphore; Pakistan Maroc Phosphore; Zuari Maroc Phosphates Limited; Paradeep Phosphates Limited; Maroc Phosphore S.A; International & trading OCP International; OCP Fertilizantes; OCP de Argentina; OCP do Brazil; Black Sea Fertilizer Trading Company; OCP Africa; Engineering & Consulting; JESA Group; OCP Solutions; OCP Maintenance Solutions; Teal Technology Services; Transportation Engineering and Management Consultants; DuPont OCP Operations Consulting; Ecosystem Development; Société d'Aménagement et de Développement Vert; Société d'Aménagement et de Développement de Mazagan; OCP Innovation Fund for Agriculture; Fondation OCP; Fondation Phosboucraâ
- Website: ocpgroup.ma

OCP Group, formerly Office Chérifien des Phosphates, is a Moroccan state-owned phosphate rock miner, phosphoric acid manufacturer and fertilizer producer. Founded in 1920, the company has grown to become the world's largest producer of phosphate and phosphate-based products and it is one of the largest phosphate, fertilizer, chemicals, and mineral industrial companies in the world by revenue.

OCP has access to more than 70% of the world's phosphate rock reserves. Initially a mining company, OCP diversified in 1965 to become a phosphate processor, making it the world's largest fertilizer manufacturer. The company holds a 31% market share of the world phosphate product market.

The Group employs nearly 17,000 people in Morocco, along with staff in several international subsidiaries. In 2024, it generated revenues of US $9.76 billion.

== History ==
=== Origins ===
The OCP Group was founded in Morocco in 1920 as the Office Chérifien des Phosphates following Royal Decree. Mining production began in 1921, when it began extracting phosphate rock at its first mine in Khouribga. Transportation of the phosphate to the port of Casablanca also started in 1921, allowing the first export of phosphate that year. Subsequently, OCP launched other mining sites in Youssoufia in 1931 and in Benguerir in 1976, and launched chemical production in Safi in 1965, and in Jorf Lasfar in 1984.

=== Ownership ===
In 2008, the OCP Group became a limited company. Currently 95% of the OCP Group is owned by the Moroccan state and 5% by Banque Centrale Populaire investment funds.

=== Corporate timeline ===
- 1920 Office Chérifien des Phosphates founded
- 1921 Launch of mining production in Khouribga
- 1931 Launch of mining production in Youssoufia
- 1965 Launch of chemical production in Safi
- 1976 Acquisition of 65% of Phosboucraa
- 1980 Launch of mining production at Benguerir site
- 1984 Launch of chemical production at Jorf Lasfar
- 1996 Construction of purified phosphoric acid plant launched in Jorf Lasfar
- 2002 OCP becomes sole owner of Phosboucraa
- 2006 Office Chérifien des Phosphates becomes OCP
- 2008 Transformation of Office Chérifien des Phosphates into a Corporation (OCP S.A)
- 2011 JESA Group, as a Joint Venture with Jacobs Engineering
- 2013 Joint Venture with DuPont de Nemours
- 2014 Launch of the Slurry Pipeline between Khouribga and Jorf Lasfar
- 2016 Creation of OCP Africa
- 2017 Inauguration of University Mohammed VI Polytechnic
- 2018 Joint Venture with IBM

In 2007, the OCP Group set itself a target to triple its production of fertilizers by 2020. The OCP Group plays an important economic and social role in Morocco. The value of phosphates and their derivatives represented nearly a quarter of the country's exports and approximately 3.5% of the GDP in 2010.

In 2016, Fitch Ratings confirmed the rating of "investment grade" for the OCP Group. After approval from the AMMC (Moroccan Authority of the Capital Market) Autorité Marocaine du Marché des Capitaux) on December 9, 2016, the OCP Group managed to reach 10.2 billion dirhams of bonds from the national community. This loan is the largest ever made in the Moroccan market. In February 2016, the OCP Group created a new subsidiary named OCP Africa, which is responsible for leading the development of the group in the African fertilizer market through a network of subsidiaries in twelve African countries.

On 8 September 2023, an earthquake with a magnitude of 6.8 M_{w} hit Marrakesh-Safi region of Morocco. Six days later, the OCP Group donated $97.5 Million to Morocco’s Earthquake Relief Fund.

=== 2020 coronavirus crisis response ===
OCP Group contributed $310 million the Moroccan emergency fund, created by King Mohammed VI on March 15.

== Operations ==
=== Mines and key sites ===
==== Khouribga ====
OCP's first mine opened in Khouribga in 1921. The Khouribga area has the richest phosphate deposits in the world. In 2014, a slurry pipeline between Khouribga and Jorf Lasfar was launched, which transports phosphate from the mines to the processing facility safely and efficiently. The pipeline, one world's longest gravity powered pipelines saves more than 3 Mm^{3} of water per year, as well as a significant amount of energy. The site employs more people than any other OCP mine, which is more than 6,100 people. In 2016, the mine produced 18.9 MT of Phosphate Rock, or 70% of the total group output.

In 1994, the OCP Group started a new mining project in Sidi Chennane in the Khouribga area. The construction of the purified phosphoric acid plant was launched in Jorf Lasfar in 1996 and started production in 1998.

In 2014, the OCP Group inaugurated the slurry pipeline linking Khouribga to Jorf Lasfar, a technological advancement in the transportation of phosphates. In February 2016, a fertilizer production plant dedicated entirely to Africa was inaugurated at Jorf Lasfar, the African Fertilizer Complex. Connected to the slurry pipeline, JFC 4 will be fully integrated and have its own thermoelectric plant. These plants not only make Jorf Lasfar completely energy self-sufficient, they also create an energy surplus that fuels the complex's sea water desalination station.

==== Gantour (Benguerir and Youssoufia) ====
Gantour is made up of two mining facilities, Benguerir and Youssoufia and holds the second largest amount of Morocco's phosphate reserves, 37% of the total. The mine in Benguerir opened in 1980. It is situated 70 km north of Marrakesh. In 2016, the mines' produced 6.3MT of Phosphate Rock, representing 23% of the group's total output. Since 2017, the mine has been one of Mohammed VI Polytechnic University's testing sites that is open to the scientific community and allows researchers from partner universities to test full-scale solutions in key areas. Called the "Advanced Mining Technology Platform," this pilot mine has many purposes. Rock from Benguerir is transported by rail to Safi by ONCF, the national railway company of Morocco. The Group's activities are organised into an integrated model covering all operations of the value chain from the extraction of phosphates to the production and marketing of various products including fertilizers and phosphoric acid. The mine in Youssoufia is the second most important mine to the Moroccan economy after the Khouribga mine. It is also the third biggest producer worldwide of phosphate. Since 1998, OCP has also operated the Bouchane mine, which is situated 40 km from Youssoufia. The phosphate from this mine is also processed at Youssoufia.

==== Jorf Lasfar ====
The Jorf Lasfar processing platform is the largest fertilizer complex in the world. The first phase of the site opened in 1984 and has been expanded multiple times since. Products are made using phosphate rock mined in Khouribga. The site produced 4.63Mt of fertilizer in 2016, including, 1.86Mt Phosphoric acid, 1.91Mt MAP, and 1.14Mt DAP. Over 30 different types of fertilizer were produced to suit various soil types. The complex is made up of several units including the newest, the Africa fertilizer complex and JFC II. The site is the world's largest exporter of fertilizer. The site has a desalination plant with a capacity of 25 Mm^{3} per year – since its construction this has significantly reduced the amount of water consumed by the plant from local sources.

==== Safi ====
The first OCP chemical site, the Safi complex started its activities in 1965 to process the phosphate rock from Benguerir. In addition to fertilizer and phosphoric acid production units, the site has a phosphate washing unit and a sulfuric acid plant.

In 2016, the site produced 1.5Mt of phosphoric acid and 832.6Kt of TSP fertilizer. These figures represented the highest production figures in the site's history. The site produces fertilizer for both the domestic and international markets.

=== Phosboucraa (subsidiary) ===
In 1976, after the Madrid Agreement with Spain, OCP acquired 65% of Phosboucraa mine (Boucraâ-Laayoune) in Western Sahara and became the sole owner in 2002. Because Western Sahara is a non-self governing territory, the legality of mining by a foreign state actor is contentious under international law. As a result, several funds have disinvested from buyers of phosphates mined by Phosboucraa, and exports have dropped.

Operations at the mine originally began in 1972; its activities include mining, processing and marketing phosphate rock. Boucraa mine represents approximately 2% of Morocco's total phosphate reserves, 4.6% of OCP Group's total revenue and around 8% of the total rock extracted. 100% of profits made in the region are reinvested in the local community through the Phosboucraa Foundation. The Phosboucraa Foundation has so far helped more the 50,000 people through its various programs in education, health, and entrepreneurship.

Phosboucraa's activities are located in three different places:

- Headquarters located in the City of Laayoune
- The processing plant and wharf are located at Laayoune beach, 20 km south-west of the Headquarters. A 102 km long conveyor belt is used for transporting phosphates from the mine
- Mining activities are located 140 km away by road in Bou Craa, thus far from any possible shipping area

To help develop the value chain at this site OCP is investing $2.2 billion to build a phosphate processing plant, producing fertilizer and phosphoric acid. The scheme is expected to create more than 5,000 job in the region.

Phosboucraa says that the project will continue a policy of hiring local workers, which they say make up 76% of the workforce, up from just 4% in 1976, achieved through outreach and training programs, and which have also led to hundreds of workers being trained to do skilled work at the groups site in the North. The numbers published by Phosboucraa, however, are disputed by local activists, including Western Sahara Research Watch, which notes that the designation of "local workers" doesn't distinguish between settlers and indigenous people.

== Products ==
=== Phosphate rock ===
The mining of phosphorite, (also known as phosphate rock or rock phosphate) was OCP's earliest operation, with the sale of these products being the company's main business. The company extracted 34.4 million tonnes in 2018, 11.3 million tons of which were exported, with Khouribga accounting for the biggest share. OCP market share in this product category is 38%.

=== Phosphoric acid ===
Phosphoric acid is made from phosphate and due to its non-toxic nature, is widely used in the food, cosmetic, and dental industry. It is an example of diversification and supply chain integration to drive value. OCP produced 6.1 million metric tonnes in 2018, giving it a market share of 49%.

=== Standard (conventional fertilizers) ===
OCP also has a number of sites producing fertilizer. Fertilizer sales, including fortified fertilizers now account for slightly over half of OCP's total revenue and 23% of its world market share (2018 production: 8.8MT). The phosphate-based conventional fertilizers produced by OCP include; Mono-Ammonium Phosphate (MAP) a concentrated phosphate fertilizer, made with phosphorus and nitrogen. Di-Ammonium Phosphate (DAP) is a concentrated phosphate fertilizer, that can also be used as a fire retardant. Triple Super Phosphate (TSP) is a concentrated phosphate fertilizer made with just phosphate. These can be used directly for soil fertilization or as raw material for blends, or other products.

=== Fortified fertilizers ===
OCP Group also produces a number of fortified fertilizers that can be tailored to meet the needs of particular types of soil – even down to a field by field scale. A number of different formulations are produced. NP+ are nitrogen and phosphate-based complex fertilizers, enriched with secondary and micro nutrients. NPK+ is similar in structure to the former, but uses a different chemical process, and contains potash. OCP products can also be tailored to meet crop specific nutrient requirements, for example, for corn, cotton, or cocoa.

=== Soluble fertilizers ===
Soluble Fertilizers are used for high value crops specifically for irrigated systems. They ensure efficient use of fertilizers, thus considerably enhance agricultural productivity and reduce water consumption. These fertilizers are well-suited to new micro-irrigation and sprinkler systems. The group's total fertilizer production is 8.8 million metric tonnes (including conventional fertilizers).

=== Animal feeds ===
OCP also produces animal feeds from phosphate. The product is called PHOSFEED and is made from phosphoric acid and calcium carbonate. PHOSFEED is GMP+, HACCP and ISO 22000 certified.

== OCP globally ==
While the majority of OCP's operations are based in Morocco due to its large Phosphate reserves, the company has expanded globally, in processing, sales, and distribution. The company has more than 160 customers on five continents. The companies also support the communities they operate in by analyzing soil to tailor fertilizer to specific needs.

=== North America ===
OCP North America, headquartered in Minnesota, United States, was founded in 2019.

=== South America ===
OCP's largest South American operations are located in Brazil. The company's Brazilian operations are made up of two companies, OCP di Brasil and OCP Fertilizantes, both headquartered in São Paulo. The companies undertake competitor and market research as well as working with farmers to establish the best fertilizers for their needs. The company also helps market, sell, and distribute OCP products in the country. OCP sales in the country increased by 20% in Q1 2019.

=== India ===
OCP India undertakes market and soil research in order to drive sales of OCP products in the country. The company carries out administration, sales support and marketing for OCP's Indian customers. The company is constructing a fertilizer plant with Krishak Bharati Limited (Kribhco) that will have a capacity of 1.2 million tonnes per year – the combined investment is worth US$230 million. The unit will use phosphate transported from OCP facilities in Morocco, the company will also be responsible for the shipping of the products.

=== Asia Pacific (APAC) ===
OCP has a research, sales and marketing function in Asia Pacific based in Singapore and Beijing. The construction of a fertilizer processing plant is underway in Singapore to allow easier mass customization of products for local markets.

=== OCP Africa ===
Founded as a wholly owned subsidiary of OCP S.A. in 2016, the company acts as a distributor for OCP products as well as operating facilities for fertilizer production. This capacity is being expanded rapidly following a large-scale investment program. OCP Group sees Africa as a major market for growth due to its unexploited potential due to the comparatively low use of fertilizers, which is reflected in lower than average per hectare crop yields. Support provided includes training programs and soil analysis that seeks to help farmers make the most of their land. OCP Africa operates in 16 African nations and has 12 subsidiary companies. OCP's largest African operation outside of Morocco, in Ethiopia, is set to expand significantly on the completion of a new fertilizer blending unit that will increase supply of customized fertilizer.

== Major subsidiaries and joint ventures ==
=== JESA ===
In 2010, OCP Group entered in to a joint venture with Jacobs Engineering Group Inc., one of the world's largest providers of technical, professional, and construction services. The new company was named Jacobs Engineering SA (JESA).

=== Prayon ===
Prayon Technologies is a joint venture between OCP Group and the Wallonia Regional Investment Company. The original company was founded in 1882, in Belgium as the Société Anonyme Métallurgique de Prayon, a Zinc producer. In 1996, OCP bought half of the shares. The company specializes in chemical R&D, finding and developing compounds and developing their use cases. The company, through OCP's expertise is recognized as a leader in phosphate creativity.

=== SEEFCO S.A. ===
In 2021, OCP Group and the Emirati Al Dahra Agricultural Company finalized the creation of a joint venture in Romania. The new company was dubbed SEEFCO S.A. (South East Europe Fertilizer Company).

=== Paradeep Phosphates Limited (PPL) ===
Paradeep Phosphates Limited (PPL) is a major Indian Phosphatic Fertilizer Manufacturer, with a 3.9 million MT capacity, partially owned by the OCP Group . Through a 50:50 joint venture (ZMPPL) with Adventz Group. It is the second-largest private sector manufacturer of phosphatic fertilizers in India.

=== Zuari Maroc Phosphates Private Limited (ZMPPL) ===
ZMPPL is a 50:50 joint venture between Zuari Agro Chemicals Ltd (ZACL) and Maroc Phosphore S.A., which is a subsidiary of OCP group, established in 2002.

== Financial information ==
Figures 2009 – 2018
| | 2009 | 2010 | 2011 | 2012 | 2013 | 2014 | 2015 | 2016 | 2017 | 2018 |
| Turnover (billions of MAD) | 25.3 | 43.5 | 56.4 | 59.4 | 46.2 | 41.4 | 47.7 | 42.5 | 48.5 | 55.9 |
| Profit (billions of MAD) | 1.3 | 8.8 | 16.3 | 14.1 | 7.1 | 7.6 | | | | 5.4 |

== See also ==
- Economy of Morocco
- Phosphate
