= Thermal remote sensing =

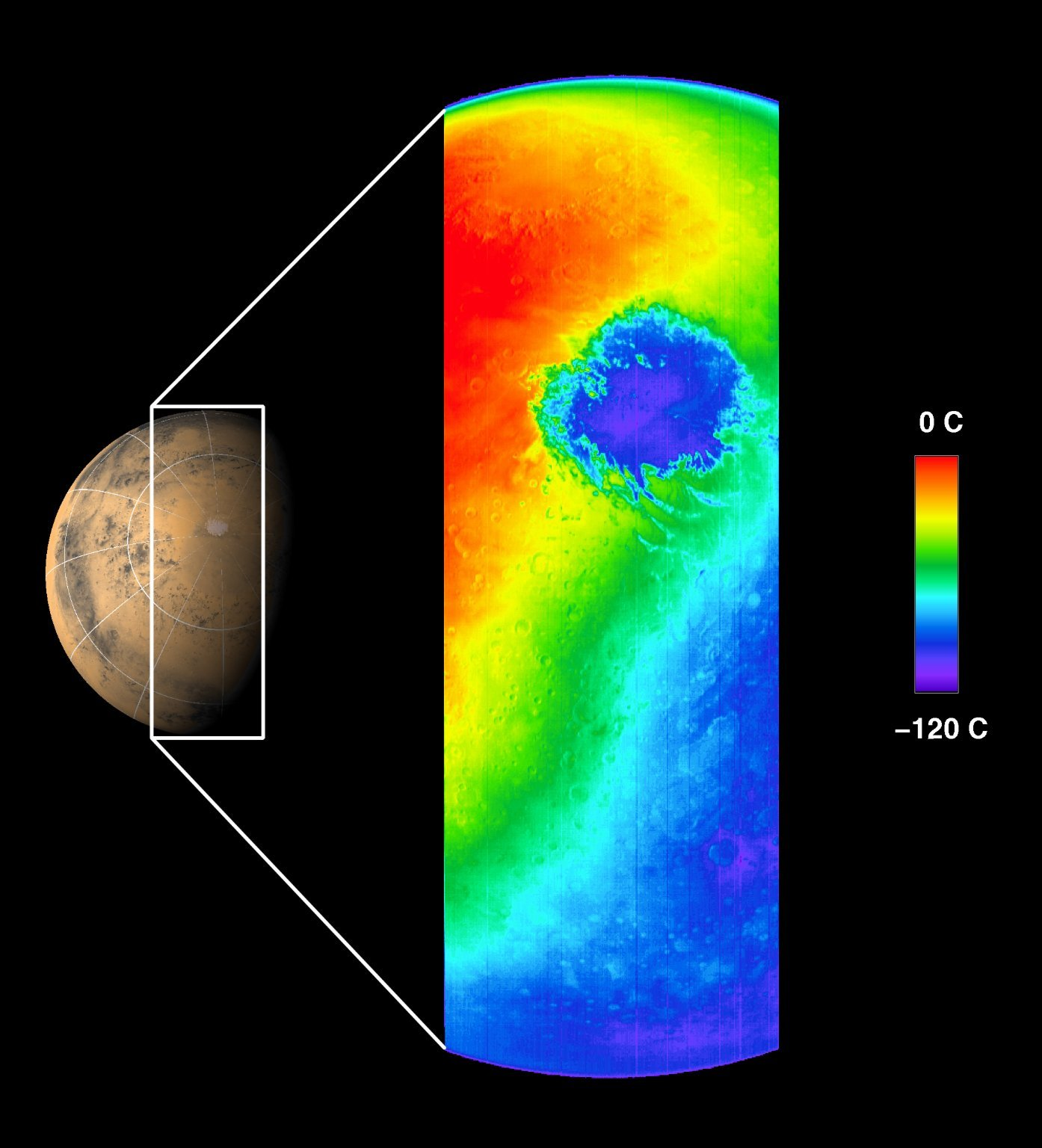
Thermal Infrared Image by Mars Odyssey's thermal emission imaging system of Mars

Thermal remote sensing is a branch of remote sensing in the thermal infrared region of the electromagnetic spectrum. Thermal radiation from ground objects is measured using a thermal band in satellite sensors.

== Principles ==
Thermal remote sensing is working on two major laws which are as follows:

1. Stefan–Boltzmann law: Surface temperature of any objects radiate energy and shows specific properties. These properties are calculated by Boltzmann law.

2. Wien's displacement law: Wien's displacement law explains the relation between temperature and the wavelength of radiation. It states that the wavelength of radiation emitted from a blackbody is inversely proportional to the temperature of the black body.

== Applications ==
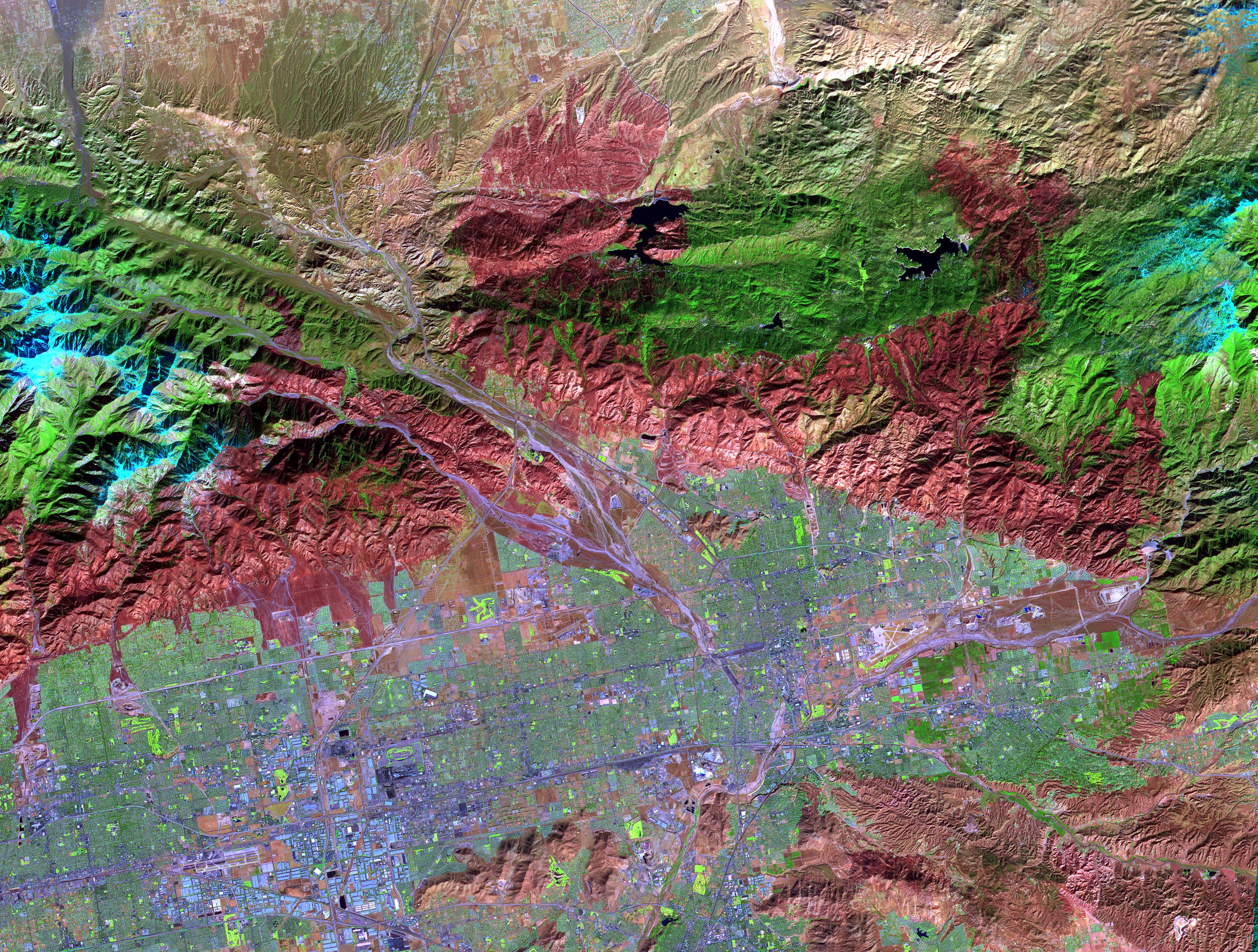
Advanced Spaceborne Thermal Emission and Reflection Radiometer (ASTER) on NASA's Terra satellite acquired this image of the Old Fire/Grand Prix fire east of Los Angeles

Thermal remote sensing is used in applications including:

- Geothermal exploration
- Identification of geological units and structures
- Urban heat islands
- Soil moisture studies
- Hydrology
- Coastal zones
- Volcanology
- Forest fires: Thermal remote sensing plays a vital role in the determination of Forest fire based on the principle of identifying fire pixel according to the temperature difference between the energy emitting from the surface and ambient temperature.
- Coal fires
- Seismology
- Environmental modelling
- Meteorology
- Intelligence / military applications
- Heat loss from buildings

== Land Surface Temperature (LST) ==
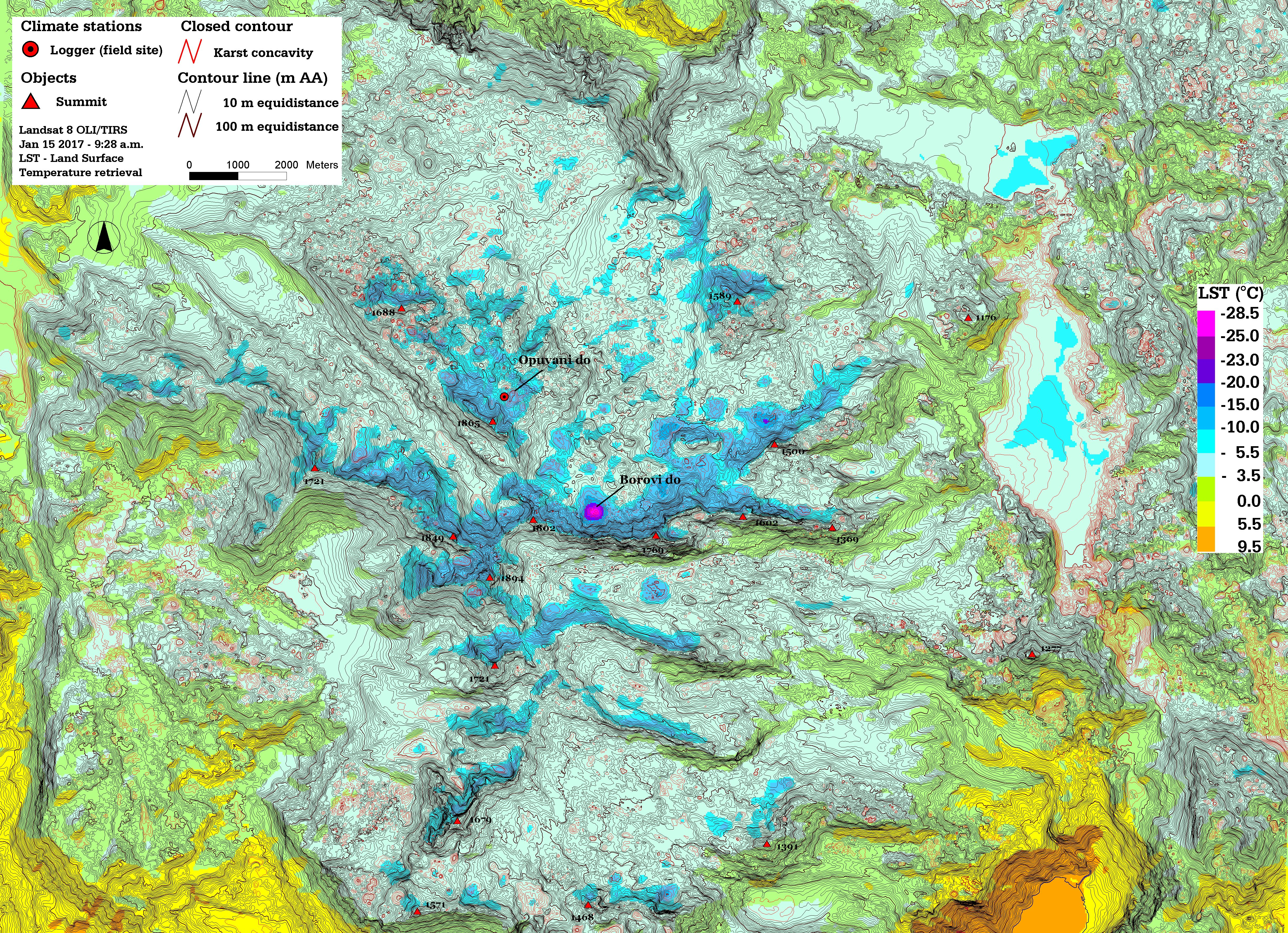
Cold-air pool on Mt Orjen during the cold-spell in January 2017 shown by a Landsat Land Surface Temperature image. Dolines collected cold air which remained also after sunrise.

One of the most important applications of thermal remote sensing in earth sciences is to calculate the Land Surface Temperature (LST). LST is a measurement of how hot the land is to the touch. It differs from air temperature (the temperature given in weather reports) because land heats and cools more quickly than air. LST is a key variable that is required to accurately model the surface energy budge. Thermal remote sensing from satellites to derive land surface temperatures has a long history that can be traced back to the TIROS-II satellite, launched in the early 60s. From the outset certain problems were recognised when deriving temperatures over the land, most notably the low temperatures observed over deserts. To quantify the effects of the atmosphere and the surface (emissivity effects) and, both from theory and experiment, various algorithms developed to derive LST. These algorithms are different in terms of accuracy and application.

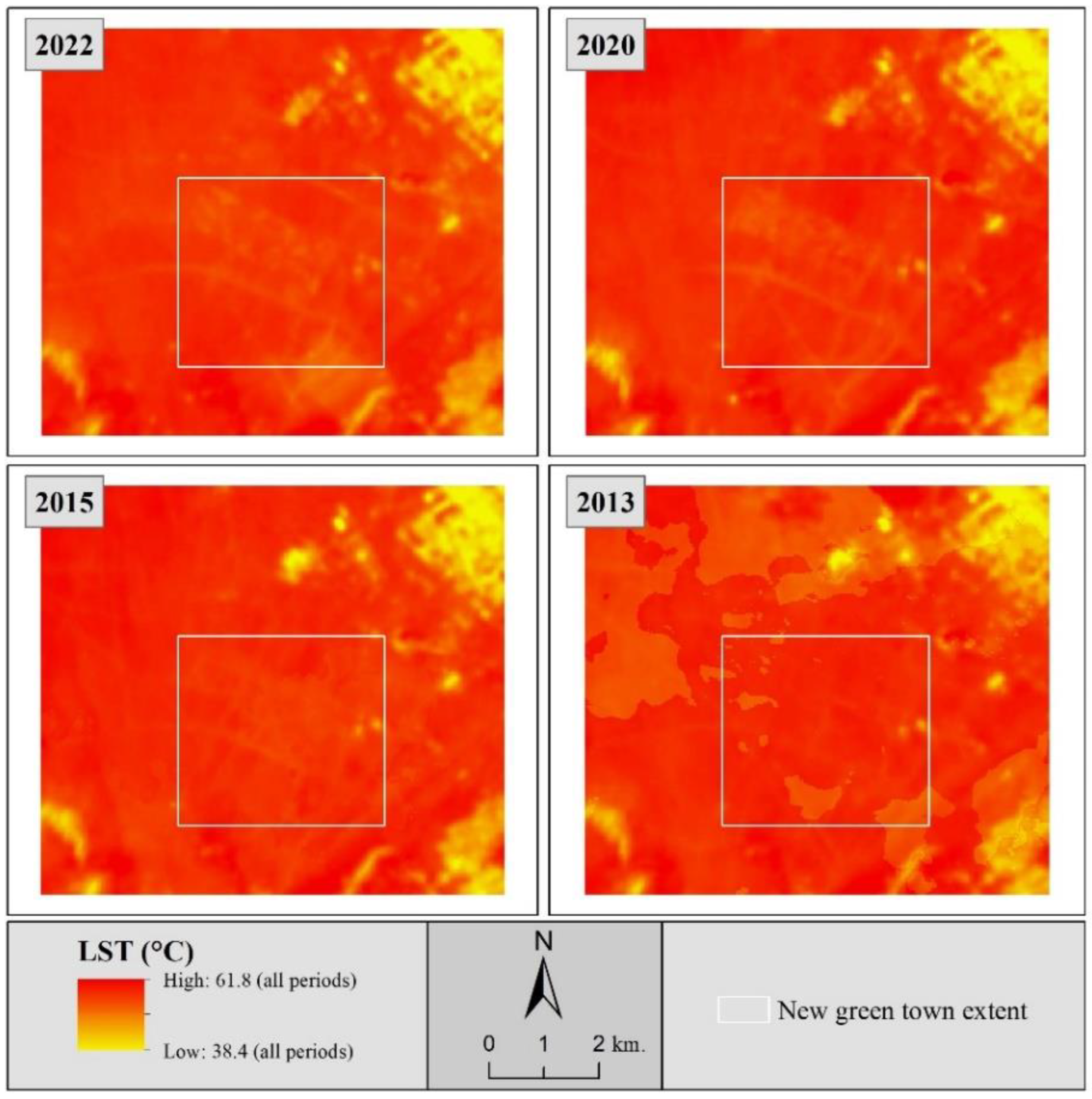
Applications of Thermal Remote Sensing in Land Surface Temperature monitoring: LST maps of Karizland, Yazd, obtained from Landsat 8 and Landsat 9 thermal bands.

== Satellites thermal bands ==
The Thematic Mapper (TM) sensor on Landsat 4 and Landsat 5 included a thermal (6th) band. Landsat 8 and Landsat-9 also acquires thermal data in two 10 and 11 bands from Thermal Infrared Sensor (TIRS).

Advanced Spaceborne Thermal Emission and Reflection Radiometer (ASTER) utilizes a unique combination of wide spectral coverage and high spatial resolution in the visible near-infrared through shortwave infrared to the thermal infrared regions. The ASTER instruments acquire thermal data in Thermal Infrared (TIR) 90 meter Bands (bands 10-14).

The Advanced Very High Resolution Radiometer (AVHRR) instrument on US National Oceanographic and Atmospheric Administration (NOAA) 9, 10, 11 and 12 had two bands in Thermal Infrared regions (bands 4, 5).

Given recent developments in UAVs, thermal images with high spatial and temporal resolutions have become available at a low cost.
