= NGC 1337 =

Galaxy in the constellation Eridanus

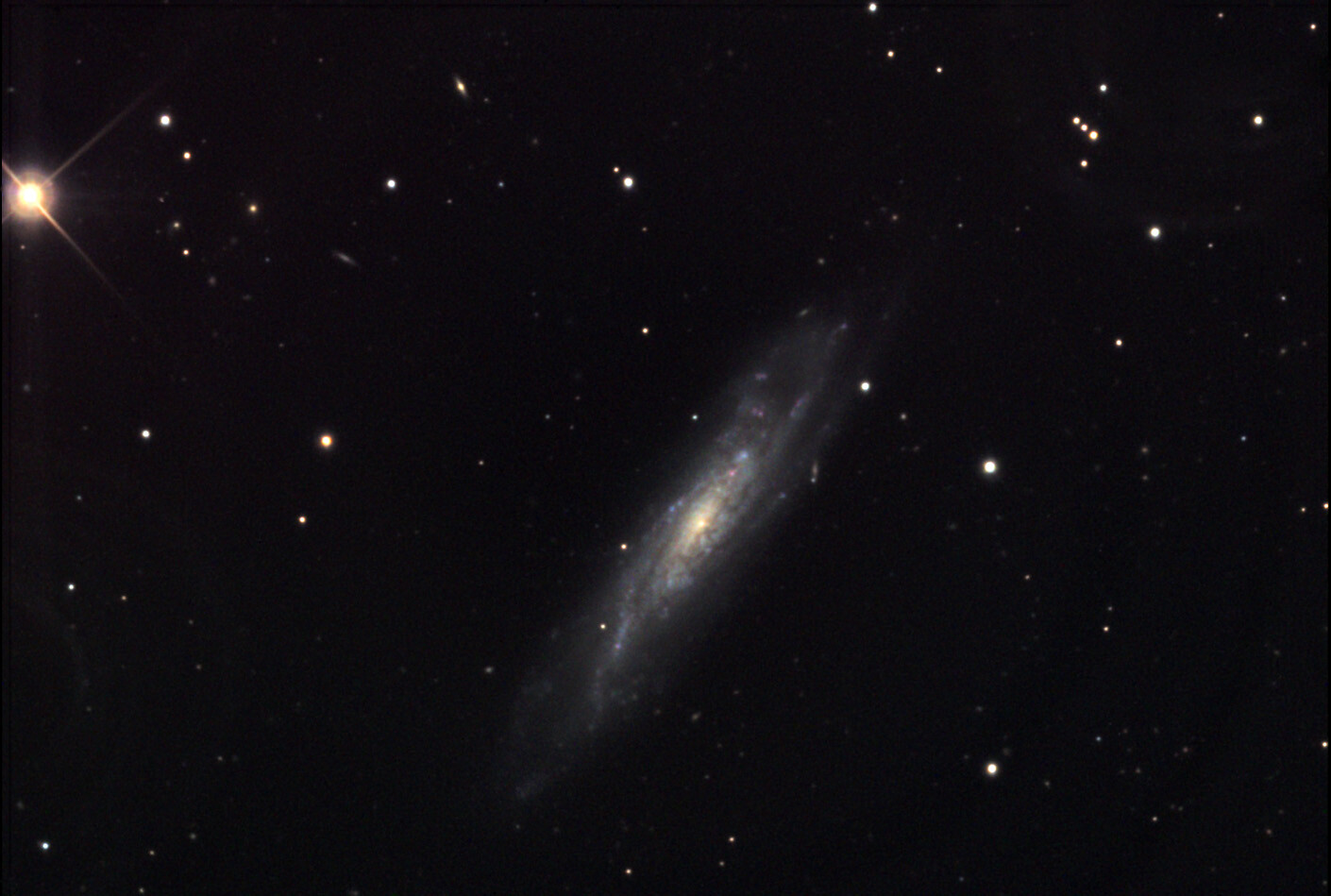
- NGC 1337 by the Advanced Observing Program (AOP) program at Kitt Peak Visitor Center

Observation data (J2000 epoch)
- Constellation: Eridanus
- Right ascension: 03^{h} 28^{m} 05.9^{s}
- Declination: −08° 23′ 19″
- Redshift: 0.004135
- Heliocentric radial velocity: 1237.2 km/s
- Distance: 45.24 ± 0.65 Mly (13.87 ± 0.20 Mpc)
- Apparent magnitude (B): 12.53

Characteristics
- Type: SA(s)cd

Other designations
- MCG -02-09-042, PGC 12916

NGC 1337 is an unbarred spiral galaxy in the constellation Eridanus. It was discovered by American astronomer Lewis Swift on 10 November 1885.
