= Moroccan Meseta =

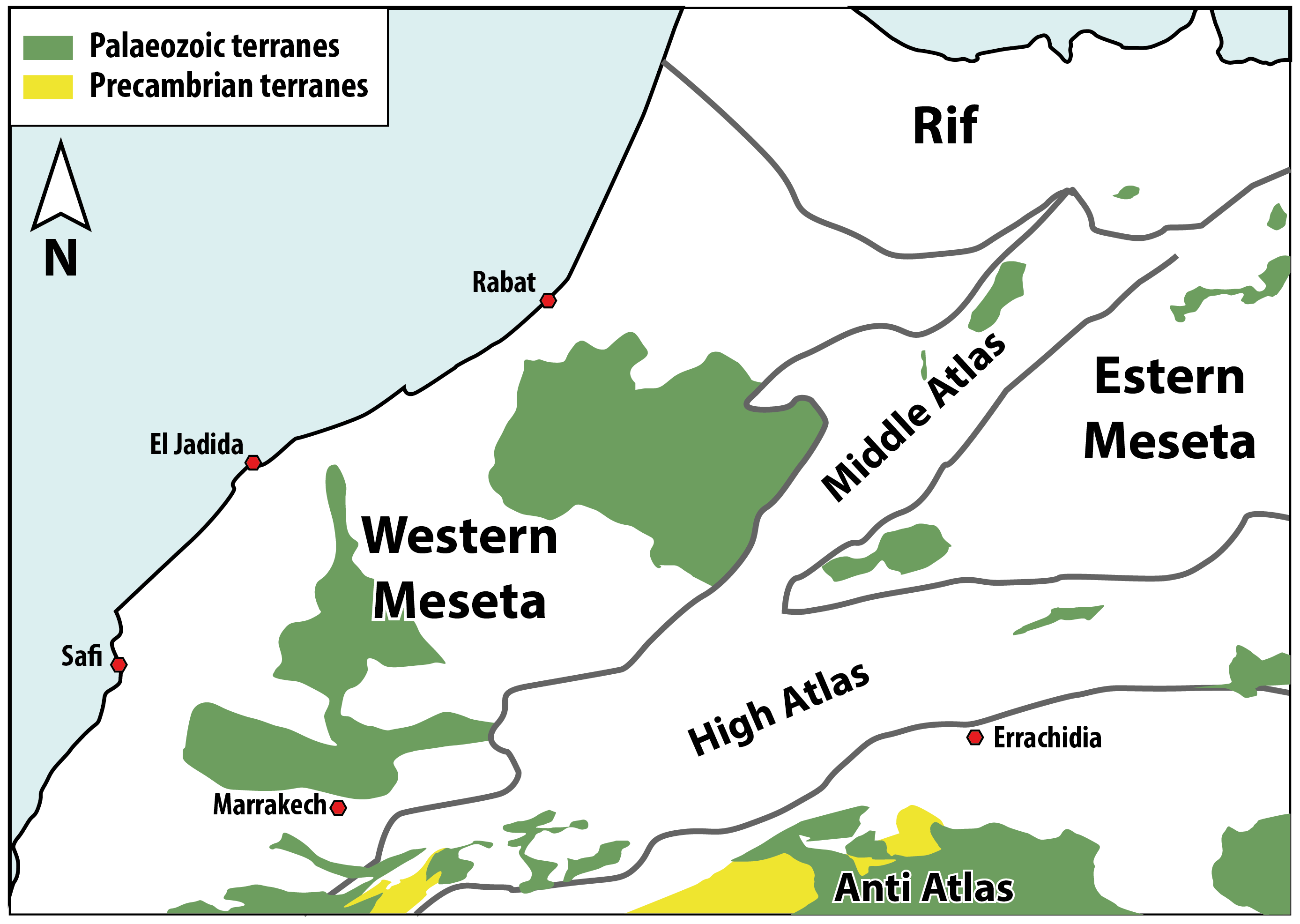
Structural map of Northern Morocco

The Moroccan Meseta or Western Meseta is an uplifted terrane of dominantly Palaeozoic rocks exposed along the Moroccan coastal block between the Atlantic Margin and the Middle Atlas.

== Geology ==
The Meseta Domain, taking its name from Spain's Meseta Central inner plateau, is an area of stable Paleozoic rock that was never affected by the Hercynian orogeny and was later covered by Mesozoic and Cenozoic sedimentary rocks. Forming Morocco's Central Massif, the Meseta Domain completely conceals Precambrian rocks, although boreholes have found Neoproterozoic rocks in a Meseta anticline. The domain is split in two by the Middle Atlas fold belt. The Western Meseta has relatively little sedimentary cover and well-developed massifs, while the Eastern Meseta spanning the border with Algeria has numerous, small Paleozoic massifs. Continuing from the Neoproterozoic until the Middle Devonian, western Morocco and the Anti-Atlas had the same depositional environment—molasse redbed deposition and post-orogeny volcanism. Southern Morocco was flooded by a massive shallow marine shelf, building up significant carbonates, mixed with continental sediments pouring in from inland areas now in the Sahara. In the Late Devonian, western Morocco and the Anti-Atlas split up into fault-bounded basins, which deformed during the Hercynian orogeny.
