= 42 (school) =

Self-study institutions of education

- Motto: BeyondTheCode
- Type: Private; Nonprofit
- Established: 2013 (Paris); 2016 (Fremont); 2021 (Istanbul); 2021 (Kocaeli); 2021 (Adelaide); 2022 (Berlin)
- President: Xavier Niel
- Director: Sophie Viger
- Administrative staff: Paris: 29; Adelaide: 7
- Students: Paris: 2,550; Adelaide: 300; Istanbul: 492; Kocaeli: 275
- Location: Paris, France; Adelaide, Australia; London, United Kingdom; Istanbul, Turkey; Kocaeli, Turkey
- Colours: Blue, green, red
- Website: www.42network.org

42 is an international network of institutions of education in computer science where students are trained through peer-to-peer pedagogy, and project-based learning. The first school was founded in Paris in 2013 by Xavier Niel, Nicolas Sadirac (former executive director at Epitech), Kwame Yamgnane, and Florian Bucher (former executives at Epitech). The school does not have any professors and is open 24/7. In 2019, the 42 Network was established to bring together partner campuses using the same educational model.

42's name is a reference to the book The Hitchhiker's Guide to the Galaxy written by British author Douglas Adams: in the book, 42 is the Answer to the Ultimate Question of Life, the Universe, and Everything.

== History ==
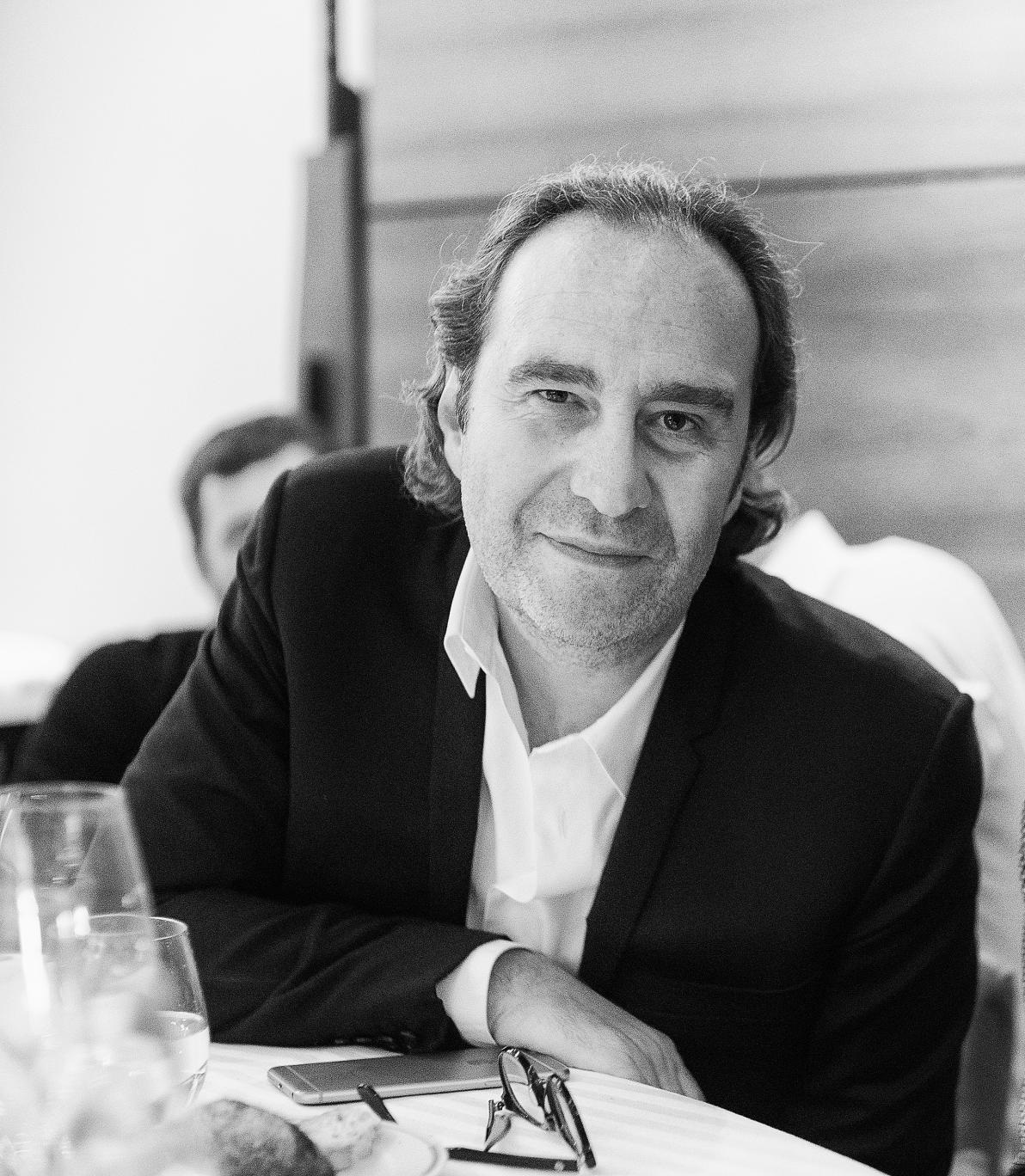
Xavier Niel, one of the founders of 42

=== Founding in Paris ===
42 was announced in March 2013 by French telecommunications entrepreneur Xavier Niel, together with Nicolas Sadirac, Kwame Yamgnane and Florian Bucher, three former executives of the computer science school EPITECH.

The school was created in response to what its founders described as a shortage of skilled software developers and as an alternative to the traditional French higher-education system. It was designed to be tuition-free and open to applicants regardless of previous academic qualifications.

Niel initially committed €70 million to the project, including €20 million for its establishment and €50 million to fund its first ten years of operation. The first selection sessions, known as the Piscine, took place during the summer of 2013, and the first class of around 900 students began its studies in Paris in November of that year.

=== Expansion to Silicon Valley ===
In May 2016, 42 announced its first campus outside France, in Fremont, California, in the San Francisco Bay Area. Niel committed US$100 million to the project, which was intended to reproduce the tuition-free and peer-learning model developed in Paris.

The Fremont campus, known as 42 Silicon Valley, marked the first attempt to reproduce the model internationally under the 42 name. It subsequently became one of the reference campuses for the school's international expansion.

42 Silicon Valley closed in 2020.

=== Creation of 42 Network ===
During the second half of the 2010s, the educational model developed in Paris was adopted by a growing number of schools outside the original campuses. Some operated under the 42 name, while others retained their own identities, including 101 in Lyon, 19 in Belgium, 1337 in Morocco, Codam in the Netherlands, Hive in Finland and School 21 in Russia.

In June 2019, 42 formally launched the 42 Network to bring these institutions together within an international network using a common educational model. The network was announced as comprising 20 partner campuses in 14 countries, 13 of them operating under the 42 name.

The launch included both existing schools and planned campuses in Europe, Africa, Asia and the Americas. Among the new locations announced at the time were Madrid, Yerevan, Tokyo, Bogotá, Rio de Janeiro, São Paulo and Quebec City.

The network expanded rapidly thereafter. By 2020, 42 reported 33 partner campuses in 22 countries on five continents.

== Admission and registration ==
The candidate must be at least 18 years old or hold a baccalauréat (it is possible to start an application for candidates in the year of their baccalaureate). No diploma is required for applicants over 18 years of age. In 2015, an experiment took place with Pôle Emploi to train a group of around thirty unemployed seniors in programming for ten months. This training has since been renewed each year.

The first selection is made using a series of logic and memory tests on the institution's website intended to assess the students' abilities to learn computer science. The second selection is called the “piscine”, meaning "pool" in French: an intensive four-week selection process during which the applicant must carry out practical work in the C Language as well as community service, sometimes considered by students as a degrading punishment. It's not uncommon for students to work 10 to 12h per day, including on week-ends, to complete the "piscine". Under the eye of the educational team who scrutinizes all their actions from the "jar" (office of the educational team) using surveillance-based big data: where are the students sitting? With whom are their usually pairing? ....

Registration for training is free and concerns each year about 850 students in Paris.

== Training structure ==
There are no lectures or practical work supervised by professors. Students are free to organize their days to carry out the projects proposed by the teaching team. The establishment is open 24 hours a day, 7 days a week.

The training provided is intended to be inspired by the changes brought about by the Internet with a pedagogy qualified as "peer-to-peer". Depending on the course chosen by the student, it delivers an RNCP title of level 6 or 7: a certificate recognized by the French State, but no diploma.

The mode of operation of 42 was inspired by that of Epitech: selection using "swimming pool" sessions and teaching according to the project mode. 42 Network attempts to establish 24/7 technology support communities in major cities worldwide through the participation of collaborative entities, achieving integration of education, industry, and technology exchange.

== Program ==
The new "42Next" curriculum is a gamified, peer-to-peer program divided into four main stages:

Selection (The Piscine): A 4-week intensive C and Shell immersion to test suitability for the model.

Foundation (Core Curriculum): Lasting 12–18 months, covering 7 pillars including C (Memory Management), Algorithms, Systems & Networks, Python (OOP), DevOps/Infrastructure, Modern Web, and—newly added—Artificial Intelligence (LLMs and RAG).

Immersion: A mandatory 6-month paid internship in the industry.

Mastery (Specialization): Students can choose advanced tracks to reach "Level 21," focusing on fields like Advanced AI, Automotive & Mobility (specifically relevant to the Wolfsburg location), Cybersecurity, and Graphics.

== Business model ==
The investment was made by Niel: 70 million euros, including 20 million for the creation of the Parisian establishment and 50 million to cover its operating costs for 10 years. The objective when creating 42 is to allow the creation of 150 companies each year, including five Internet giants, in the hope that these young shoots pay their apprenticeship tax to the establishment. At the start of 2015, Sadirac said "If we are not able to generate five big successes per year, it is because we will have failed. Then there will be no more reason to finance us."

== Controversies ==
On November 2, 2014, one of the 60 cameras installed at Nicolas Sadirac's request, caught him spanking a young woman, followed by sexual intercourse, in one of the school's amphitheater.

In 2017, with less than 10% female students, a report from the magazine Usine Nouvelle highlighted sexist behavior at 42. This included pornographic websites as wallpapers, misogynistic pornographic content being commonplace on some public Slack channels, and upskirt pictures. Fabienne Haas, director of communication, argued that since the slack is managed by the student themselves, it is hard for the school to moderate it. Some sanctions against students were taken, but none were expelled from the school.

In July 2018, Sadirac left after a financial audit ordered by Niel, giving away all his parts in the school.

In June 2024, Québec numérique (the non-profit organization hosting 42 Québec and its campus) announced its closure in the following month, blaming a missing grant payment from Quebec's Ministry of Employment and Social Solidarity. The Ministry blamed "possible irregularities [...] on the management of the grant."

== 42 Network ==
=== Organisation and common model ===
Campuses within 42 Network are operated and financed locally by different organisations, including companies, foundations, public institutions and non-profit organisations. They share the educational principles and selection methods developed by 42, while their governance and funding structures vary between locations.

The network is based on a common curriculum and peer-to-peer, project-based learning model. Local campuses may nevertheless adapt parts of their programme to their economic environment and local employment needs.

=== Campuses ===
42 Network is a changing international network. New campuses are regularly announced or opened, while some projects do not ultimately become operational. Existing campuses may also be renamed, close, or leave the network.

The following list includes campuses currently presented by 42 Network as partner campuses on its official website.

Former members of the network, as well as other schools that have used the 42 educational model without currently being part of 42 Network, are listed separately below. te

Name	Country	Location	Year opened	Official website
42 Tirana	Albania	Tirana	2025	https://42tirana.al/
42 Luanda	Angola	Luanda	2023	https://42luanda.com/
42 Yerevan	Armenia	Yerevan	2020	https://42yerevan.am/
42 Vienna	Austria	Vienna	2022	https://42vienna.com/
42 Wels	Austria	Wels	2026	https://42wels.at/
42 Antwerp	Belgium	Antwerp	2022	https://42belgium.be/
42 Brussels	Belgium	Brussels	2018	https://42belgium.be/
42 Belo Horizonte	Brazil	Belo Horizonte	2022	https://42bh.org.br/
42 Rio	Brazil	Rio de Janeiro	2022	https://42.rio/
42 São Paulo	Brazil	São Paulo	2020	https://42sp.org.br/
42 Prague	Czech Republic	Prague	2022	https://42prague.com/
42 Angoulême	France	Angoulême	2022	https://42angouleme.fr/
42 Le Havre	France	Le Havre	2023	https://42lehavre.fr/
42 Lyon	France	Lyon	2017	https://42lyon.fr/
42 Marseille	France	Marseille	2025	https://42marseille.com/
42 Mulhouse	France	Mulhouse	2021	https://42mulhouse.fr/
42 Nice	France	Nice	2020	https://42nice.fr/
42 Paris	France	Paris	2013	https://42.fr/
42 Perpignan Occitanie	France	Perpignan	2023	https://42perpignan.fr/
42 Berlin	Germany	Berlin	2022	https://42berlin.de/
42 Heilbronn	Germany	Heilbronn	2021	https://42heilbronn.de/
42 Wolfsburg	Germany	Wolfsburg	2021	https://42wolfsburg.de/
42 Firenze	Italy	Florence	2022	https://42firenze.it/
42 Milano	Italy	Milan		https://42milano.com/
42 Roma	Italy	Rome	2021	https://42roma.it/
42 Tokyo	Japan	Tokyo	2020	https://42tokyo.jp/
42 Amman	Jordan	Amman	2023	https://42amman.com/
42 Irbid	Jordan	Irbid	2025	https://42irbid.com/
42 Beirut	Lebanon	Beirut	2024	https://42beirut.com/
42 Luxembourg	Luxembourg	Luxembourg	2022	https://42luxembourg.lu/
42 Antananarivo	Madagascar	Antananarivo	2023	https://42antananarivo.mg/
42 Iskandar Puteri	Malaysia	Iskandar Puteri	2024	https://42iskandarputeri.edu.my/
42 Kuala Lumpur	Malaysia	Kuala Lumpur	2020	https://42kl.edu.my/
42 Penang	Malaysia	Penang	2025	https://42penang.edu.my/
1337 Ben Guerir	Morocco	Ben Guerir	2019	https://1337.ma/
1337 Khouribga	Morocco	Khouribga	2018	https://1337.ma/
1337 Med	Morocco	Tétouan	2022	https://1337.ma/
1337 Rabat	Morocco	Rabat	2024	https://1337.ma/
Codam	Netherlands	Amsterdam	2018	https://www.codam.nl/
42 Warsaw	Poland	Warsaw	2023	https://42warsaw.pl/
42 Lisboa	Portugal	Lisbon	2020	https://42lisboa.com/
42 Porto	Portugal	Porto	2022	https://42porto.com/
42 Singapore	Singapore	Singapore	2023	https://42singapore.sg/
42 Gyeongsan	South Korea	Gyeongsan	2023	http://42gyeongsan.kr/
42 Seoul	South Korea	Seoul	2020	https://42seoul.kr/
42 Barcelona	Spain	Barcelona	2021	https://42barcelona.com/
42 Madrid	Spain	Madrid	2019	https://42madrid.com/
42 Málaga	Spain	Málaga	2022	https://42malaga.com/
42 Urduliz	Spain	Urduliz	2021	https://42urduliz.com/
42 Lausanne	Switzerland	Lausanne	2021	https://42lausanne.ch/
42 Zürich	Switzerland	Zürich	2026	https://42zurich.ch/
42 Bangkok	Thailand	Bangkok	2019	https://42bangkok.com/
42 Istanbul	Turkey	Istanbul	2021	https://42istanbul.com.tr/
42 Kocaeli	Turkey	Kocaeli	2021	https://42kocaeli.com.tr/
42 Abu Dhabi	United Arab Emirates	Abu Dhabi	2021	https://42abudhabi.ae/
42 London	United Kingdom	London	2023	https://42london.com/

=== Former and associated campuses ===
42 Network has evolved since its creation, with some campuses closing or leaving the network and other organisations adopting or adapting the educational model developed by 42. Former network campuses and other historically associated schools are therefore listed separately from the current partner campuses above.

==== Former 42 Network campuses ====
Several campuses that were previously part of 42 Network are no longer active members of the network.

Name	Country	Location	Opened	Status
42 Silicon Valley	United States	Fremont, California	2016	Closed in 2020.
42 Québec	Canada	Quebec City	2021	Closed in January 2025 after public funding for the campus was not renewed.
Hive Helsinki	Finland	Helsinki	2019	Left the 42 curriculum in 2025, switching to the platform and curriculum developed by Kood.
42 Adelaide	Australia	Adelaide	2021	Former Australian 42 campus; its operator, KIK Innovation, subsequently ceased operating the campus under the 42 licence.

==== Other schools associated with the 42 model ====
Some organisations have used the educational model or curriculum developed by 42 without all of their individual locations necessarily being members of 42 Network.

===== School 21 =====
Sberbank launched School 21 in Moscow in 2018 using the educational model developed by 42. In June 2019, School 21 joined the newly created 42 Network as one of its partner schools.

A second School 21 campus opened in Kazan in 2020, and the organisation subsequently expanded to numerous cities across Russia. School 21 continues to operate a network of campuses using a peer-to-peer and project-based educational model derived from 42.

Because later School 21 locations are not individually documented as partner campuses of 42 Network, they are not included in the list of current 42 Network campuses above.
