= University Mohammed VI Polytechnic =

Private university in Benguerir, Morocco

Coordinates: 32.2188°N 7.9355°W

- Université Mohammed VI Polytechnique جامعة محمد السادس متعددة التخصصات التقنية ⵜⴰⵙⴷⴰⵡⵉⵜ ⵎⵓⵃⵎⵎⴷ ⵡⵉⵙⵙ ⵚⴹⵉⵚ ⴰⴳⵜⵉⵇⵏⵉ
- Motto: Empowering minds
- Type: Private non-profit research university
- Established: 2013; 13 years ago
- Parent institution: OCP Foundation
- Academic affiliations: AAU; ARUA; IAU
- Endowment: $213.5 million (2023)
- President: Hicham El Habti
- Vice-president: Karim El Aynaoui; Younes Kchia
- Students: 8,756
- Doctoral students: 1,308
- Location: Lot 660, Hay Moulay Rachid, Benguerir, Morocco
- Campus: Urban (main in Benguerir; second in Rabat)
- Colors: Orange and white
- Website: www.um6p.ma

University Mohammed VI Polytechnic (UM6P) is a non-profit private research university in Morocco. Established in 2013, UM6P engages in applied research and innovation, with a mission of contributing to regional economic and human development.

The main campus is located in the Mohammed VI Green City of Benguerir, near Marrakesh. UM6P also has a major campus in Rabat, situated in the municipality of Salé, and another in Laayoune. In addition to these campuses, the university operates Global Hubs in Paris, New York, and Montreal, extending its presence nationally and internationally. A new suburban campus is planned to open in El Jadida in 2034.

UM6P emphasizes experiential learning, entrepreneurship, and collaboration with industry. Its educational model integrates academic instruction with practical training through living laboratories, pilot projects, and fieldwork, particularly in areas such as sustainable agriculture, renewable energy, and digital technologies. The institution also supports innovation and technology transfer through incubators, startup accelerators, and partnerships with both local and international companies.

The university federates a number of schools and research institutes, some of which predate its establishment. It maintains international partnerships with leading academic institutions, including the Massachusetts Institute of Technology, Columbia Business School, the Max Planck Society, HEC Paris, Mines ParisTech, EPFL, McGill University, and Sciences Po.

UM6P is ranked among the Top 400 in the 2026 Times Higher Education World University Rankings.

== History ==
=== Early days ===
The University Mohammed VI Polytechnic project is part of the Green City of Benguerir, launched in 2009 by King Mohammed VI. It is an initiative led by the OCP Foundation, aiming to create a hub of academic, scientific, and technological excellence in Morocco. The university was officially established in 2013 and inaugurated on January 12, 2017, by the King.

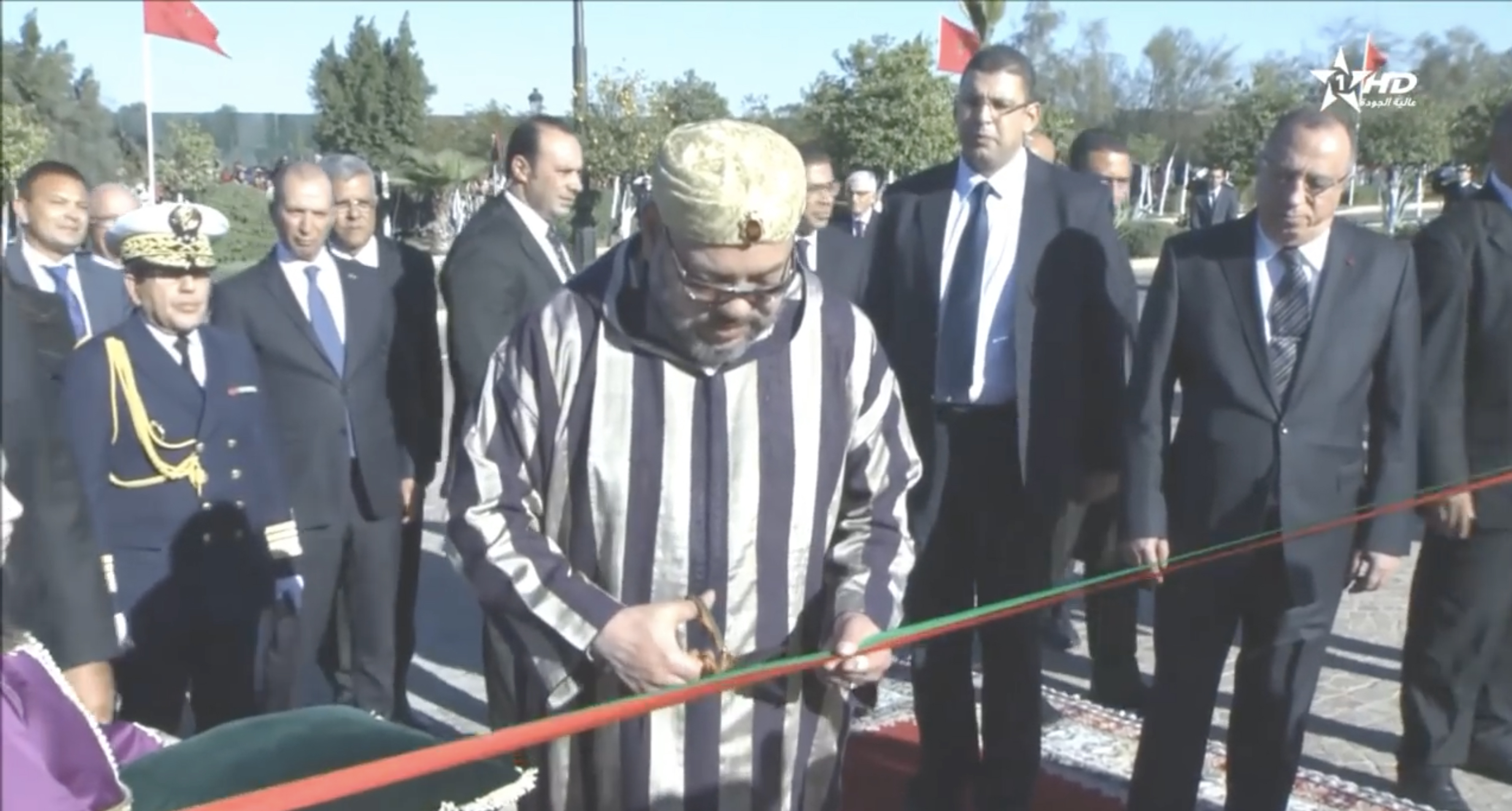
Inauguration of UM6P Benguerir in 2017

=== Expansion ===
Over the years, UM6P has experienced growth through the creation or integration of several institutions. In 2013, it launched the School of Industrial Management (EMINES), followed in 2014 by the integration of the Faculty of Governance, Economics and Social Sciences (FGSES). In 2015, it established the School of Agriculture, Fertilization and Environmental Sciences (ESAFE), and launched its first research departments, notably MSN (Materials Science) and SIMLAB (modeling and simulation).

Africa Business School was inaugurated in 2016. In 2018, the university expanded its scientific activities with the creation of the Institute of Science, Technology and Innovation (IST&I). The following year saw the opening of the School of Architecture, Planning and Design (SAP+D), as well as the School of Collective Intelligence.

Africa Business School, located on the Rabat campus

In 2020, new entities were launched, including the Green Tech Institute, the School of Computer Science (UM6P-CS), the School of Hospitality Business and Management, and a Doctoral School. The following year, the university inaugurated the African Supercomputing Center, hosting the Toubkal supercomputer, ranked among the global TOP500.

In 2021, as part of its national expansion, UM6P opened a new campus in Rabat. Designed by the Bofill Taller de Arquitectura firm, as is the Benguerir campus, this site hosts programs in humanities and social sciences, governance, public policy, and management sciences. It is also home to the Policy Center for the New South, a Moroccan think tank specializing in geopolitics, development, and public policy. The campus aims to offer an academic complement to the Benguerir site, aligned with the economic and institutional challenges of the country and the African continent. The campus's main auditorium (French: centre de congrès) was officially opened in September 2023.

== Campuses ==
The University Mohammed VI Polytechnic operates across several locations in Morocco and internationally. Its main campus is located in Benguerir, at the heart of the Mohammed VI Green City, a sustainable urban hub. The university also has other campuses in Rabat and Laayoune.

=== Benguerir Campus ===
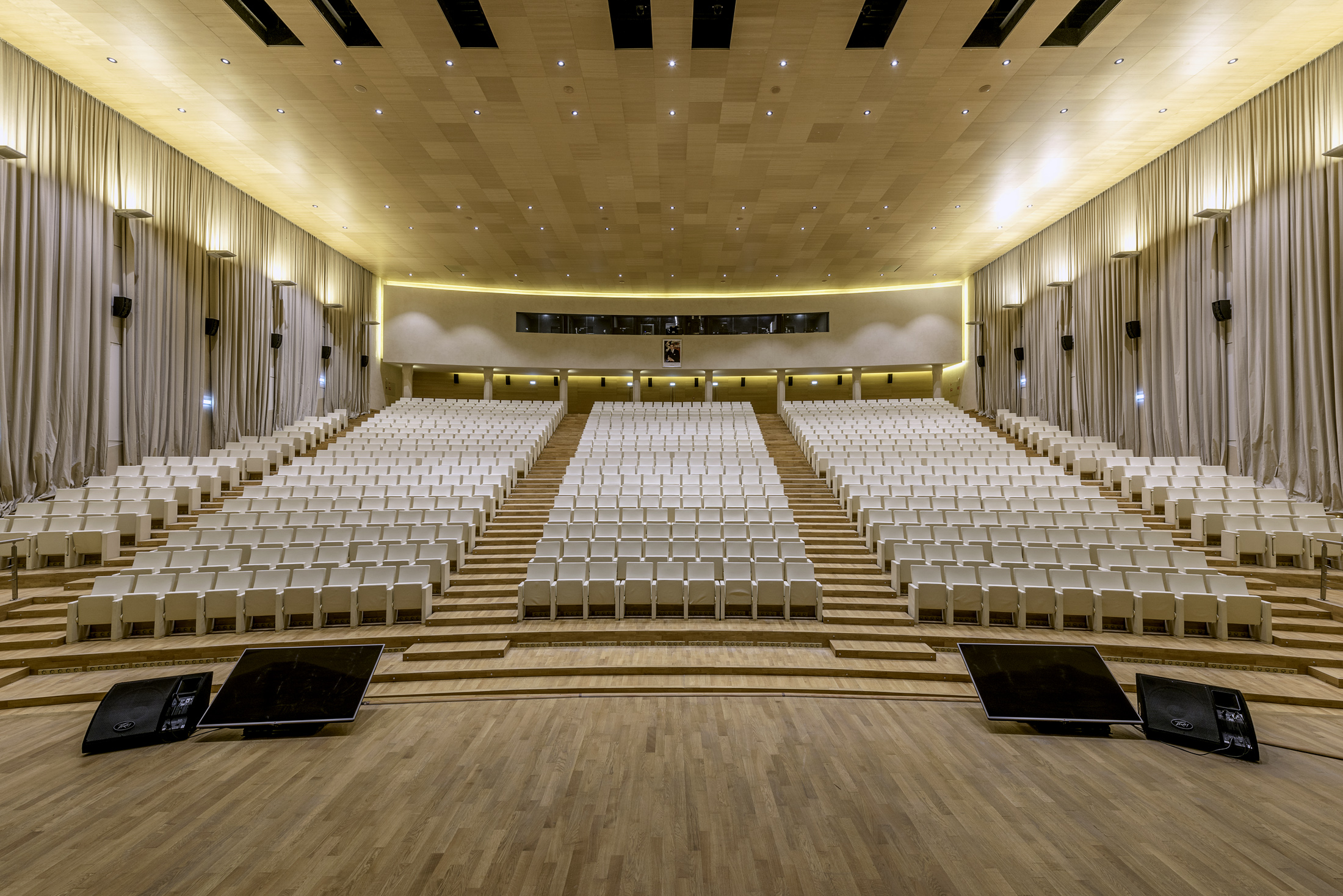
Conference hall at the Benguerir campus

UM6P’s main campus, established in Benguerir, is an integral part of the Mohammed VI Green City, a purpose-built sustainable city designed to promote innovation and ecological urban living. Designed by architects Ricardo Bofill and Elie Mouyal, the campus blends contemporary architecture with elements of Moroccan tradition. The architectural complex is characterized by minimalist buildings in warm tones, integrated into an environment conducive to learning, research, and community life.

The campus design also aims to promote sustainable development and foster integration among students, researchers, faculty, and local residents. This approach was recognized with the SILVER rating under the STARS system (Sustainability Tracking, Assessment & Rating System), with a score of 49.48 points.

Main entrance to UM6P Benguerir

The Benguerir campus hosts a significant portion of the university’s academic and scientific activities. It is home to several schools and research centers, including the School of Computer Science, the African Sustainable Agriculture Research Institute (ASARI), the School of Collective Intelligence, and the Data & AI School. The site is equipped with facilities, including laboratories, a university library, student residences, sports complexes, healthcare services, and community living spaces.

=== Rabat Campus ===
Academic buildings of UM6P in Rabat

UM6P also operates a campus in Rabat, located in the municipality of Salé. This site aims to strengthen the university’s institutional presence in the nation’s administrative capital. It hosts academic programs in political science, international relations, diplomacy, law, governance, and public policy. The campus is also home to the Africa Business School, UM6P’s business school, which offers training in leadership, entrepreneurship, innovation, and strategy.

The Rabat campus hosts the Faculty of Governance, Economics and Social Sciences (FGSES), founded in 2008 and integrated into UM6P in 2019. The institution also develops applied research and executive education programs targeting professionals and decision-makers.

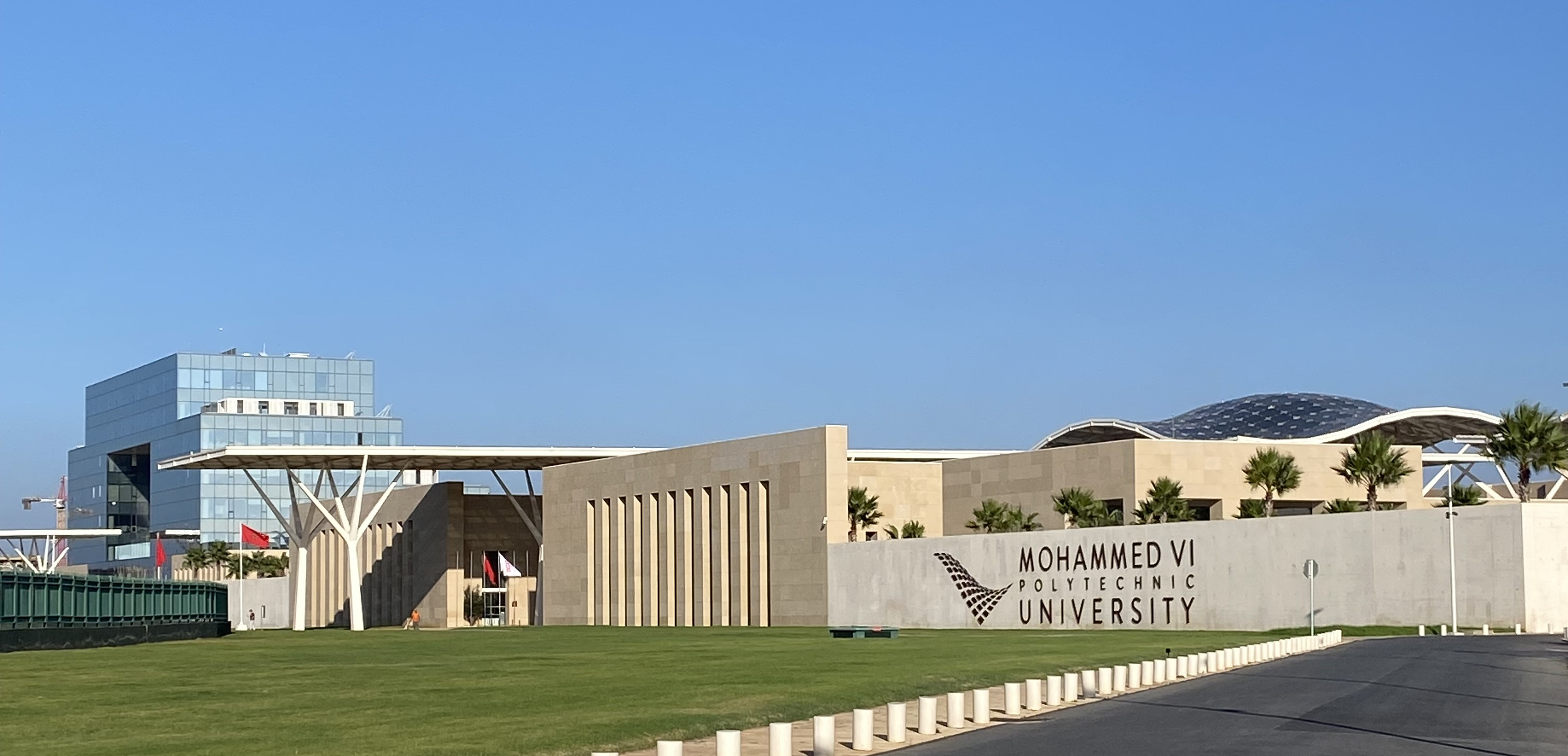
Entrance to the Rabat campus

The site features educational infrastructure, including classrooms, lecture halls, a library, as well as co-working and collaboration spaces for students and researchers. The campus also benefits from an academic environment connected to public institutions, international organizations, and economic partners based in Rabat.

== Partnerships ==
UM6P has developed a network of partnerships and connections around the world with higher education institutions, research centers, organizations, and companies, among others. These collaborations are based on the principles of sharing best practices, excellence, and mutual benefit, and target cooperation in research, education, innovation, and entrepreneurship across all areas of focus.

As a higher education and research university, UM6P sees these partnerships as opportunities to respond to the needs of its ecosystem and accelerate its contribution to national development plans. The university continues to forge meaningful links aligned with its development objectives and aspirations at local, regional, and international levels.

=== Academic partnerships ===
UM6P maintains academic and scientific partnerships with institutions across the globe. These collaborations span countries such as Morocco, the United States, Canada, France, Switzerland, Germany, Austria, Spain, China, Malaysia, Brazil, Australia, Finland, the United Kingdom, the Netherlands, and Côte d’Ivoire. Its academic partners include:

- Massachusetts Institute of Technology (MIT)
- École nationale supérieure des mines de Paris
- École nationale des ponts et chaussées
- École polytechnique
- École Polytechnique Fédérale de Lausanne
- Columbia University
- Sorbonne Universités

=== Industrial and technological partnerships ===
In 2022, the university established a partnership with Oracle Corporation and the Moroccan government to create the first Oracle Lab in Africa, located in Casablanca. This collaboration focuses on research in artificial intelligence, machine learning, and cloud computing, while also supporting skills development through training programs and internships. The partnership aims to strengthen digital innovation and contribute to Morocco’s technology ecosystem.

UM6P also entered into a collaboration with Microsoft Africa Transformation Office to provide training resources, cloud computing access, and support for entrepreneurship. As part of this initiative, a Microsoft Sustainability Core and a Digital Innovation Center of Excellence were launched at the university.

In November 2024, the Africa Center of Manufacturing Excellence (ACME) was created by UM6P in Nouaceur, in partnership with the Moroccan government and Boeing. Announced during the Marrakech Air Show, the center focuses on research and training in advanced manufacturing, including automation, Industry 4.0, and materials engineering. In June 2025, during the Paris Air Show, Boeing expanded this partnership to support skill development and technological innovation in Morocco’s aerospace sector.

In July 2025, UM6P formalized a maritime R&D collaboration with Naval Group and Maghreb Steel in Rabat. A framework agreement was signed to launch research and development projects in the naval domain, including the design, construction, and maintenance of maritime structures.

== Mission ==
The mission of UM6P is centered on advancing research and innovation, with a focus on supporting development across Africa. The university collaborates with institutions throughout the continent and has established experimental platforms and applied research laboratories in partnership with other universities. Among its key research centers is MSDA (Modeling, Simulation, and Data Analysis), which specializes in mathematical and phenomenological modeling, numerical simulation, and data analysis.

=== Pan-African engagement ===
The university positions its work within a pan-African dynamic by establishing partnerships with universities and research centers, and by supporting collaborative programs aimed at helping address the continent’s development needs. These initiatives focus on applied research, innovation, doctoral training, and capacity building.

Among its recent initiatives is the Excellence in Africa program, developed in collaboration with the École Polytechnique Fédérale de Lausanne (EPFL), which supports the development of young African teacher-researchers, the training of 100 PhD students, and the creation of competence centers in digital education. In 2025, UM6P also launched a scholarship program with the Mastercard Foundation, aiming to train 575 young African women over a ten-year period.

Other initiatives such as NextAfrica, a GreenTech and AgriTech acceleration program between Station F and UM6P, as well as the Youth Tech Challenge Africa, focused on the co-design of future African cities, further demonstrate the university’s practical commitment to innovation on the continent.

== See also ==
- List of universities in Morocco
- List of works by Ricardo Bofill Taller de Arquitectura
