= 2019–20 IR Tanger season =

Tanger
2019–20 season
- President: Abdelhamid Abarchan
- Manager: Nabil Neghiz (until 26 October 2019); Abdelouahed Belqassem (interim; until 19 November 2019); Hicham Dmiai (until 26 January 2020); Juan Pedro Benali
- Stadium: Stade Ibn Batouta
- Botola: 14th
- Moroccan Throne Cup: Quarter-finals
- Arab Club Champions Cup: Preliminary round
- Top goalscorer: League: Sofian El Moudane (4 goals); All: Youssef Anouar (5 goals)
- Highest home attendance: 25,000 vs Raja CA (15 January 2020)
- Lowest home attendance: 2,500 vs OC Khouribga (4 December 2019)
- Average home league attendance: 11,944 (Matches played behind closed doors are not included)
- Biggest win: Horseed FC 1-6 IR Tanger
- Biggest defeat: Wydad AC 4-0 IR Tanger
Home colours	Away colours

The 2019–20 season is Ittihad Riadi Tanger's 37th season in existence and the club's 21st in the top flight of Moroccan football, and fifth consecutive.

== Kit ==
Supplier: Gloria Sport / Club Sponsor: front: Renault (the only sponsor in the ACCC), Moroccan Airports Authority, APM Terminals, Tanger-Med; back: ; sleeves: STG Telecom; short: RCI Finance Maroc

Home	Away

== Season review ==
=== June ===
On 26 June, the club announced Nabil Neghiz would be the new IRT coach.

=== July ===
On 8 July, Ittihad Tanger announced they had reached an agreement with AS Athlétic d'Adjamé for the transfer of Mustafa Camara.

== Players ==
=== Squad ===
As of 10 October 2020.

Note: Flags indicate national team as defined under FIFA eligibility rules; some limited exceptions apply. Players may hold more than one non-FIFA nationality.

No.	Pos.	Nation	Player
2	MF	MAR	Anas Al Asbahi (on loan from Wydad AC)
3	DF	MAR	Hatim El Ouahabi
4	DF	MAR	Kamal Ait El Haj
5	MF	MAR	Mohamed Ayman Sadil
6	MF	MAR	Nouaman Aarab (captain)
7	FW	MAR	Mohamed El Amraoui
8	MF	MAR	Faouzi Abdel Mutalib
11	FW	MAR	Taoufik Ijrouten
14	FW	MAR	Youssef Anouar
15	DF	MAR	Ayoub Jarfi (vice-captain)
16	MF	MAR	Ahmed Chentouf (4th captain)
18	MF	MAR	Soufian Echaraf
19	DF	CIV	Mustapha Camara

No.	Pos.	Nation	Player
20	FW	MAR	Ibrahim Bezghoudi
21	FW	MAR	Abdelghani Mouaoui
22	DF	MAR	Tarik Asstati
25	MF	MAR	Anouar Jayed
29	DF	SEN	El Hadji Youssoupha Konaté
31	MF	MAR	Sofian El Moudane
33	GK	MAR	Imad Askar
40	DF	MAR	Mehdi Khallati
55	GK	MAR	Tarik Aouattah
65	GK	MAR	Hicham El Mejhed (3rd captain)
77	FW	COD	Mukoko Batezadio
93	DF	MAR	Mohamed Chibi
—	DF	CIV	Kassi Akesse Mathias

==== From youth squad ====
Note: Flags indicate national team as defined under FIFA eligibility rules; some limited exceptions apply. Players may hold more than one non-FIFA nationality.

No.	Pos.	Nation	Player
13	FW	MAR	Abdellatif Akhrif
23	DF	MAR	Reda Mhannaoui
34	DF	MAR	Oussama Al Aiz
35	MF	MAR	Marouane Nebouch

No.	Pos.	Nation	Player
36	GK	MAR	Ahmed Ben Aissa
66	MF	MAR	Yassine El Assri
88	MF	MAR	Badr Mesrar

==== Out during the season ====
Note: Flags indicate national team as defined under FIFA eligibility rules; some limited exceptions apply. Players may hold more than one non-FIFA nationality.

No.	Pos.	Nation	Player
11	FW	MAR	Abdelkabir El Ouadi
2	DF	MAR	Redouane Mrabet (captain)
9	FW	LBA	Saleh Al Taher
10	MF	LBA	Zakaria Alharaish (on loan from Al Ahli SC)

No.	Pos.	Nation	Player
17	FW	MAR	Younes Ed-dyb
27	FW	MAR	Ayoub Gaadaoui
10	FW	POR	Carlos Fortes (on loan from CS U Craiova)

== Transfers ==
=== Players in ===
N.	Pos.	Name	Age	Moving from	Type	Transfer window	Ends	Transfer fee	Source
—	FW	(Morocco) Ahmed Hammoudan	27	(Saudi Arabia) Al-Raed FC	Loan return	Summer		Free	fb.com/clubirt
—	FW	(Morocco) Zakaria Boulaich	22	R Beni Mellal	Loan return	Summer		Free	fb.com/clubirt
—	MF	(Morocco) Abdelghafour Jebroun		USM Aït Melloul	Loan return	Summer		Free	fb.com/clubirt
17	FW	(Morocco) Younes Ed-dyb	25	O Dcheira	Loan return	Summer		Free	fb.com/clubirt
—	MF	(Morocco) Soufia Abakkali			Loan return	Summer		Free	fb.com/clubirt
—	MF	(Morocco) Abdelali Assri			Loan return	Summer		Free	fb.com/clubirt
19	DF	(Ivory Coast) Mustapha Camara	19	(Ivory Coast) AS Athlétic d'Adjamé	Transfer	Summer	2024	?	fb.com/clubirt riyada.lesiteinfo.com
5	DF	(Morocco) Mohamed Aymen Sadil	25	Raja CA	Swap	Summer	2022	Free	fb.com/clubirt
14	FW	(Morocco) Youssef Anouar	29	Fath US	Transfer	Summer	2021	Free	fb.com/clubirt
8	MF	(Morocco) Faouzi Abdel Mutalib	22	CR Bernoussi	Transfer	Summer	2023	?	fb.com/clubirt
29	DF	(Senegal) El Hadji Youssoupha Konaté	25	(Algeria) JS Saoura	Transfer	Summer	2022	? 330.000 $	fb.com/clubirt
22	DF	(Morocco) Tarik Astati	28	DH Jadidi	Transfer	Summer	2021	Free	fb.com/clubirt
4	MF	(Morocco) Kamal Ait El Haj	35	OC Safi	Transfer	Summer	2021	?	fb.com/clubirt
9	FW	(Libya) Saleh Al Taher	27	(Libya) Al Ahli SC	Transfer	Summer	2021	?	fb.com/clubirt
25	MF	(Morocco) Anouar Jayed	28	DH Jadidi	Transfer	Summer	2021	Free	fb.com/clubirt
40	DF	(Morocco) Mehdi Khallati	27	AS FAR	Transfer	Summer	2021	Free	fb.com/clubirt
10	MF	(Libya) Zakaria Alharaish	27	(Libya) Al Ahli SC	Loan	Summer	2020	Free	fb.com/clubirt
31	MF	(Morocco) Sofian El Moudane	25	(Slovakia) FK Senica	Transfer	Winter	2022	? 220.000 $	fb.com/clubirt
21	FW	(Morocco) Abdelghani Mouaoui	30	OC Safi	Transfer	Winter	2022	Free	fb.com/clubirt
93	DF	(Morocco) Mohamed Chibi	26	Free agent	Transfer	Winter	2021	Free	fb.com/clubirt
10	FW	(Portugal) Carlos Fortes	25	(Romania) CS U Craiova	Loan	Winter	2020	Free	fb.com/clubirt
11	FW	(Morocco) Taoufik Ijroten	29	RS Berkane	Transfer	Winter	2021	Free	fb.com/clubirt
20	FW	(Morocco) Ibrahim Bezghoudi	36	CAY Berrechid	Transfer	Winter	2021	Free	fb.com/clubirt
	DF	(Ivory Coast) Kassi Akesse Mathias	34	OC Khouribga	Transfer	Winter	2020	Free	fb.com/clubirt
2	MF	(Morocco) Anas El Asbahi	26	Wydad AC	Loan	Winter	2020	Free	fb.com/clubirt

=== Players out ===
N.	Pos.	Name	Age	Moving to	Type	Transfer window	Transfer fee	Source
5	MF	(Morocco) Omar Arjoune	23	Raja CA	Transfer	Summer	1.700.000 MAD + Mohamed Aymen Sadil	fb.com/clubirt RajaClubAthletic.ma
24	DF	(Morocco) Noureddine Aboulfarah		Free Agent	End of contract	Summer	–	
29	DF	(Morocco) Oussama El Ghrib	32	Free Agent	End of contract	Summer	–	
99	MF	(Morocco) Issam Erraki	38	MAS Fez	End of contract	Summer	Free	fb.com/CLUBMASOFF
21	DF	(Morocco) Ayoub El Khaliqi	32	Free Agent	End of contract	Summer	–	
14	MF	(Morocco) Omar Najdi	29	Free Agent	End of contract	Summer	–	
1	GK	(Morocco) Salaheddine Chihab	20	WA Fès	Contract termination	Summer	Free	
8	DF	(Morocco) Benaissa Benamar	22	(Netherlands) SC Telstar	Contract termination	Summer	Free	SCTelstar.nl
9	FW	(Morocco) Hamza Ghatas	25	Kénitra AC	Contract termination	Summer	Free	
10	MF	(Morocco) Rachid Housni	29	Free Agent	Contract termination	Summer	–	
13	DF	(Morocco) Mohamed Hamami	27	Kénitra AC	Contract termination	Summer	Free	
17	FW	(Morocco) Mehdi Naghmi	30	MC Oujda	Contract termination	Summer	Free	
19	FW	(Morocco) Ayoub Bouraada		JS Kasbah Tadla	Contract termination	Summer	Free	
22	GK	(Morocco) Issam Lahlafi	29	Free Agent	Contract termination	Summer	–	
26	FW	(Morocco) Abdelelah Erroubia	26	CR Al Hoceima	Contract termination	Summer	Free	fb.com/ChababCRA
—	FW	(Morocco) Ahmed Hammoudan	28	(Qatar) Al-Khor SC	Loan	Summer	?	fb.com/alkhorclub
4	DF	(Ivory Coast) Didier Pepe	20	Tihad AS	Contract termination	Summer	–	
12	FW	(Cameroon) Rostand Junior M'baï	24	Free Agent	Contract termination	Summer	–	
20	DF	(Gabon) Stevy Nzambe	27	(Iraq) Al-Zawraa SC	Loan	Summer	?	fb.com/alzawraasc
—	FW	(Morocco) Zakaria Boulaich	22	CR Al Hoceima	Contract termination	Summer	Free	fb.com/ChababCRA
11	FW	(Morocco) Abdelkabir El Ouadi	26	(Egypt) Wadi Degla SC	Transfer	Summer	230.000 $	fb.com/clubirt
23	DF	(Morocco) Mohamed Benfarha	21	CR Al Hoceima	Contract termination	Summer	Free	fb.com/ChababCRA
9	FW	(Libya) Saleh Al Taher	27	(Bahrain) Riffa SC	Transfer	Winter	Free	ig.com/riffasportsclub
27	FW	(Morocco) Ayoub Gaadaoui	28	OC Safi	Contract termination	Winter	Free	fb.com/clubirt fb.com/ocsfootfc
10	MF	(Libya) Zakaria Alharaish	28	(Algeria) CS Constantine	End of loan	Winter	Free	fb.com/clubirt
17	FW	(Morocco) Younes Ed-dyb	26	IZ Khemisset	Loan	Winter	Free	
2	DF	(Morocco) Redouane Mrabet	34	Free Agent	Contract termination	Winter	–	
10	DF	(Portugal) Carlos Fortes	25	(Portugal) UD Vilafranquense	End of loan	Summer	–	UDVfutsad.com

== Technical staff ==
Position	Name
First team head coach	(Algeria) Nabil Neghiz
Assistant coach	(Morocco) Abdelouahed Belqassem
Fitness coach	(Morocco) Saïd Hammouni
Goalkeeping coach	(Morocco) Mohamed Bestara

until 26 October 2019.

Position	Name
First team head coach	(Morocco) Abdelouahed Belqassem (interim)

until 19 November 2019.

Position	Name
First team head coach	(Morocco) Hicham Dmii
Assistant coach	(Morocco) Youssef Meriana
2nd Assistant coach	(Morocco) Kamal Salhi
Fitness coach	(Morocco) Saïd Hammouni
Goalkeeping coach	(Morocco) Mohamed Bistara

until 26 January 2020.

Position	Name
First team head coach	(Spain) (Morocco) Juan Pedro Benali
Assistant coach	(Spain) José David Garcia Sierra
2nd Assistant coach	(Morocco) Ahmed Salah
Fitness coach	(Spain) Eric Penido
Goalkeeping coach	(Morocco) Mohamed Bistara

from 6 August 2020.

Position	Name
Assistant coach	(Morocco) Abdessamad Rafik
Fitness coach	(Morocco) Rachid Blej

== Statistics ==
=== Squad appearances and goals ===
Last updated on 10 October 2020.

No.	Pos	Nat	Player	Total		Botola		Coupe du Trône		Arab Club Champions Cup	
No.	Pos	Nat	Player	Apps	Goals	Apps	Goals	Apps	Goals	Apps	Goals
Goalkeepers
33	GK	(Morocco) MAR	Imad Askar	1	-5	1	(-5)	0	(0)	0	(0)
36	GK	(Morocco) MAR	Ahmed Ben Aissa	0	0	0	(0)	0	(0)	0	(0)
55	GK	(Morocco) MAR	Tarik Aouattah	1	1	0	(0)	0	(0)	1	(1)
65	GK	(Morocco) MAR	Hicham El Mejhed	34	-35	29	(-31)	3	(-2)	2	(-2)
Defenders
3	DF	(Morocco) MAR	Hatim El Ouahabi	19	1	16	1	1	0	2	0
5	DF	(Morocco) MAR	Mohamed Aymen Sadil	19	0	10+3	0	3	0	3	0
15	DF	(Morocco) MAR	Ayoub Jarfi	16	0	12+1	0	2	0	1	0
19	DF	(Ivory Coast) CIV	Mustapha Camara	7	0	3	0	1	0	3	0
22	DF	(Morocco) MAR	Tarik Astati	30	1	23+2	1	3	0	2	0
23	MF	(Morocco) MAR	Reda Mhannaoui	6	0	3+3	0	0	0	0	0
29	DF	(Senegal) SEN	El Hadji Youssoupha Konaté	28	2	25+1	2	2	0	0	0
34	DF	(Morocco) MAR	Oussama Al Aiz	1	0	0+1	0	-	-	-	-
40	DF	(Morocco) MAR	Mehdi Khallati	21	1	21	1	0	0	0	0
93	DF	(Morocco) MAR	Mohamed Chibi	15	2	10+5	2	-	-	-	-
	DF	(Ivory Coast) CIV	Kassi Akesse Mathias	0	0	0	0	-	-	-	-
Midfielders
2	MF	(Morocco) MAR	Anas El Asbahi	11	0	6+5	0	-	-	-	-
4	MF	(Morocco) MAR	Kamal Ait El Haj	11	0	5+3	0	0+1	0	2	0
6	MF	(Morocco) MAR	Nouaman Aarab	28	3	21+2	2	3	0	2	1
8	MF	(Morocco) MAR	Faouzi Abdel Mutalib	15	1	4+8	1	2	0	0+1	0
16	MF	(Morocco) MAR	Ahmed Chentouf	16	1	4+7	0	1+1	0	3	1
18	MF	(Morocco) MAR	Soufian Echaraf	24	1	14+5	0	3	0	2	1
25	MF	(Morocco) MAR	Anouar Jayed	17	0	10+6	0	0+1	0	0	0
31	MF	(Morocco) MAR	Sofian El Moudane	17	4	17	4	-	-	-	-
35	MF	(Morocco) MAR	Marouane Nebouch	1	0	0+1	0	-	-	-	-
66	MF	(Morocco) MAR	Yassine El Assri	1	0	0+1	0	-	-	-	-
88	MF	(Morocco) MAR	Badr Mesrar	1	0	1	0	-	-	-	-
Forwards
7	FW	(Morocco) MAR	Mohamed El Amraoui	14	2	3+5	1	0+3	0	2+1	1
11	FW	(Morocco) MAR	Taoufik Ijroten	17	1	12+5	1	-	-	-	-
13	FW	(Morocco) MAR	Abdellatif Akhrif	1	0	0+1	0	-	-	-	-
14	FW	(Morocco) MAR	Youssef Anouar	32	5	20+5	2	3+1	1	2+1	2
20	FW	(Morocco) MAR	Ibrahim Bezghoudi	12	1	4+8	1	-	-	-	-
21	FW	(Morocco) MAR	Abdelghani Mouaoui	14	0	9+5	0	-	-	-	-
77	FW	(Democratic Republic of the Congo) COD	Mukoko Batezadio	29	0	18+6	0	3	0	1+1	0
Players who have made an appearance or had a squad number this season but have left the club
~~11~~	FW	(Morocco) MAR	Abdelkabir El Ouadi	1	0	-	-	-	-	1	0
~~2~~	DF	(Morocco) MAR	Redwan Mrabet	10	0	4+3	0	0+1	0	1+1	0
~~9~~	FW	(Libya) LBA	Saleh Al Taher	10	2	3+3	0	2	1	1+1	1
~~10~~	MF	(Libya) LBA	Zakaria Alharaish	10	0	5+3	0	1+1	0	0	0
~~17~~	FW	(Morocco) MAR	Younes Ed-dyb	10	4	2+4	0	1+1	2	1+1	2
~~27~~	FW	(Morocco) MAR	Ayoub Gaadaoui	13	1	7+3	1	0	0	1+2	0
~~10~~	FW	(Portugal) POR	Carlos Fortes	7	0	5+2	0	-	-	-	-

=== Goalscorers ===
No.	Pos.	Nation	Name	Botola	Throne Cup	Arab Club Champions Cup	Total
14	FW	(Morocco)	Youssef Anouar	2	1	2	5
31	MF	(Morocco)	Sofian El Moudane	4	0	0	4
6	MF	(Morocco)	Nouaman Aarab	2	0	1	3
93	DF	(Morocco)	Mohamed Chibi	2	0	0	2
29	DF	(Senegal)	El Hadji Youssoupha Konaté	2	0	0	2
7	FW	(Morocco)	Mohamed El Amraoui	1	0	1	2
8	MF	(Morocco)	Faouzi Abdel Mutalib	1	0	0	1
22	DF	(Morocco)	Tarik Astati	1	0	0	1
20	FW	(Morocco)	Ibrahim Bezghoudi	1	0	0	1
3	DF	(Morocco)	Hatim El Ouahabi	1	0	0	1
40	DF	(Morocco)	Mehdi Khallati	1	0	0	1
11	FW	(Morocco)	Taoufik Ijroten	1	0	0	1
16	MF	(Morocco)	Ahmed Chentouf	0	0	1	1
18	MF	(Morocco)	Soufian Echaraf	0	0	1	1
~~17~~	FW	(Morocco)	Younes Ed-dyb	0	2	2	4
~~9~~	FW	(Libya)	Saleh Al Taher	0	1	1	2
~~27~~	FW	(Morocco)	Ayoub Gaadaoui	1	0	0	1
TOTAL				20	4	9	33

=== Assists ===
No.	Pos.	Nation	Name	Botola	Throne Cup	Arab Club Champions Cup	Total
22	DF	(Morocco)	Tarik Astati	2	0	1	3
16	MF	(Morocco)	Ahmed Chentouf	1	1	1	3
7	FW	(Morocco)	Mohamed El Amraoui	0	0	3	3
93	DF	(Morocco)	Mohamed Chibi	2	0	0	2
77	FW	(Democratic Republic of the Congo)	Mukoko Batezadio	1	0	1	2
31	MF	(Morocco)	Sofian El Moudane	1	0	0	1
20	MF	(Morocco)	Ibrahim Bezghoudi	1	0	0	1
21	FW	(Morocco)	Abdelghani Mouaoui	1	0	0	1
3	DF	(Morocco)	Hatim El Ouahabi	1	0	0	1
8	MF	(Morocco)	Faouzi Abdel Mutalib	1	0	0	1
35	MF	(Morocco)	Marouane Nebouch	1	0	0	1
TOTAL				12	1	6	19

=== Clean sheets ===
Last updated on 10 October 2020.

No	Name	Botola	Coupe du Trône	Arab Club Champions Cup	Total
33	(Morocco) Askar	0/1	0/0	0/0	0/1
36	(Morocco) Ben Aissa	0/0	0/0	0/0	0/0
55	(Morocco) Aouattah	0/0	0/0	0/1	0/1
65	(Morocco) El Mejhed	13/29	1/3	1/2	15/34
Total		13/30	1/3	1/3	15/36

=== Disciplinary record ===
N	P	Nat.	Name	Botola			Coupe du Trône			Arab Club Champions Cup			Total			Notes
N	P	Nat.	Name	Yellow card	Second yellow card	Red card	Yellow card	Second yellow card	Red card	Yellow card	Second yellow card	Red card	Yellow card	Second yellow card	Red card	Notes
2	MF	(Morocco)	Anas El Asbahi	3									3			
3	DF	(Morocco)	Hatim El Ouahabi	2									2			
4	MF	(Morocco)	Kamal Ait El Haj	1						2			3			
5	DF	(Morocco)	Mohamed Aymen Sadil	2		1							2		1	
6	MF	(Morocco)	Nouaman Aarab	4			1			1			6			
7	FW	(Morocco)	Mohamed El Amraoui							1			1			
14	MF	(Morocco)	Youssef Anouar	2						1			3			
15	DF	(Morocco)	Ayoub Jarfi	4									4			
16	MF	(Morocco)	Ahmed Chentouf	1									1			
19	DF	(Ivory Coast)	Mustapha Camara							1			1			
20	FW	(Morocco)	Ibrahim Bezghoudi	1									1			
21	FW	(Morocco)	Abdelghani Mouaoui	1									1			
22	DF	(Morocco)	Tarik Astati	8			1						9			
23	DF	(Morocco)	Reda Mhannaoui	2									2			
25	MF	(Morocco)	Anouar Jayed	2									2			
29	DF	(Senegal)	El Hadji Youssoupha Konaté				1						1			
31	MF	(Morocco)	Sofian El Moudane	3	1								3	1		
40	DF	(Morocco)	Mehdi Khallati	1									1			
65	GK	(Morocco)	Hicham El Mejhed	3						1			4			
77	FW	(Democratic Republic of the Congo)	Mukoko Batezadio	5								1	5		1	
93	DF	(Morocco)	Mohamed Chibi	1		1							1		1	
~~2~~	DF	(Morocco)	Redouane Mrabet	1									1			
~~10~~	MF	(Libya)	Zakaria Alharaish	1									1			
~~27~~	FW	(Morocco)	Ayoub Gaadaoui	3									3			

Last updated: 7 October 2020
Source: mountakhab.net
Only competitive matches
(yellow card) = Number of bookings; (second yellow card) = Number of sending offs after a second yellow card; (red card) = Number of sending offs by a direct red card.

== Pre-season and friendlies ==
20 July 2019 1	IR Tanger (Morocco)	1–1	(Morocco) AS FAR	Tangier, Morocco
17:00 UTC+1	El Ouadi		Goal Penalty missed	Stadium: Stade Centre Ziaten

23 July 2019 2	IR Tanger (Morocco)	0–2	Libya A'	Tangier, Morocco
17:00 UTC+1			Akasha; Rizk	Stadium: Stade Centre Ziaten

27 July 2019 3	IR Tanger (Morocco)	0–2	(Spain) CD Leganés	Tangier, Morocco
20:30 UTC+1	Aarab (yellow card) 35' (yellow-red card) 63'; Jarfi (yellow card) 51'	Report	Rubén Pérez (yellow card) 36'; Eraso 45'; Sabin 57'; Tarín (yellow card) (yellow-red card) 71'; Mejías (yellow card) 88'	Stadium: Stade Ibn Batouta

3 August 2019 4	CA Bordj Bou Arréridj (Algeria)	1–0	(Morocco) IR Tanger	Kartepe, Turkey
14:30 UTC+1	Goal			Stadium: Green Park

5 August 2019 5	Al-Shahania SC (Qatar)	1–4	(Morocco) IR Tanger	Kartepe, Turkey
13:00 UTC+1	Goal		Al Taher; El Amraoui; Gaadaoui (pen.)	Stadium: Green Park

8 August 2019 6	Al-Muharraq SC (Bahrain)	1–2	(Morocco) IR Tanger	Kartepe, Turkey
15:00 UTC+1	Goal		Al Taher (pen.)	Stadium: Green Park
Note: The referee suspended the game in the 70th minute due to the roughness of the Bahraini team.

5 September 2019 7	IR Tanger (Morocco)	3–1	(Morocco) Ajax Tanger	Tangier, Morocco
17:30 UTC+1	El Amraoui 25'; Faouz 43'; Konaté 63'		Goal	Stadium: Stade Centre Ziaten

10 September 2019 8	IR Tanger (Morocco)	3–1	(Morocco) IR Tanger (youth)	Tangier, Morocco
--:-- UTC+1	Gaadaoui; Chentouf; Ed-dyb		Goal	Stadium: Stade Centre Ziaten

10 October 2019 9	Fath US (Morocco)	1–2	(Morocco) IR Tanger	Rabat, Morocco
18:00 UTC+1	Penalty missed Goal		Mukoko 32'; Ed-dyb 73'	Stadium: Stade Moulay Hassan

16 October 2019 10	IR Tanger (Morocco)	6–1	(Morocco) Ch. Ben Diban T	Tangier, Morocco
--:-- UTC+1	Ed-dyb; Aarab; Alharaish; Mukoko; Anouar		Goal	Stadium: Stade Centre Ziaten

16 November 2019 11	Kénitra AC (Morocco)	3–1	(Morocco) IR Tanger	Kenitra, Morocco
15:00 UTC+1	Goal		Goal	Stadium: Stade Municipal

3 January 2020 12	IR Tanger (Morocco)	2–0	(Morocco) AS FAR	Tangier, Morocco
15:30 UTC+1	Jarfi 22'; Mhannaoui 75'			Stadium: Stade Centre Ziaten

25 July 2020 13	Raja Agadir (Morocco)	0–0	(Morocco) IR Tanger	Agadir, Morocco
18:00 UTC+1				Stadium: Stade Adrar annexe Attendance: 0

26 July 2020 14	Hilal Tarrast (Morocco)	0–2	(Morocco) IR Tanger	Agadir, Morocco
10:00 UTC+1			Mouaoui 21'; Anouar 88'	Stadium: Stade Adrar annexe Attendance: 0

28 July 2020 15	USM Aït Melloul (Morocco)	1–3	(Morocco) IR Tanger	Agadir, Morocco
18:00 UTC+1	Goal		Khallati; El Amraoui; Echaraf	Stadium: Stade Adrar annexe Attendance: 0

== Competitions ==
Win Draw Loss

=== Overview ===
Competition	First match	Last match	Starting round	Final position	Record							
Competition	First match	Last match	Starting round	Final position	Pld	W	D	L	GF	GA	GD	Win %
Botola	14 September 2019	10 October 2020	Matchday 1	14th	30	7	11	12	20	36	−16	23.33
Throne Cup	31 August 2019	22 October 2019	Round of 32	Quarter-finals	3	2	0	1	4	2	+2	66.67
Arab Club Champions Cup	18 August 2019	24 August 2019	Preliminary round	Preliminary round	3	2	0	1	9	3	+6	66.67
Total					36	11	11	14	33	41	−8	30.56

Last updated: 10 October 2020.
Source: Competitions

=== Standings ===
Pos	Team	Pld	W	D	L	GF	GA	GD	Pts	Qualification or relegation
12	Nahdat Zemamra	30	8	10	12	40	41	−1	34	
13	Olympic Safi	30	6	15	9	25	34	−9	33	
14	IR Tanger	30	7	11	12	20	36	−16	32	
15	Olympique Khouribga (R)	30	6	10	14	24	38	−14	28	Relegation to Botola 2
16	Raja Beni Mellal (R)	30	1	9	20	13	42	−29	12	Relegation to Botola 2

Updated to match(es) played on 11 October 2020. Source: frmf.ma
Rules for classification: 1) Points; 2) Head-to-head points; 3) Head-to-head goal difference; 4) Goal difference; 5) Goals scored; 6) Fair-play points; 7) Play-off.
(R) Relegated

==== Results summary ====
Overall								Home						Away					
Pld	W	D	L	GF	GA	GD	Pts	W	D	L	GF	GA	GD	W	D	L	GF	GA	GD
30	7	11	12	20	36	−16	32	4	8	3	11	12	−1	3	3	9	9	24	−15

Last updated: 10 October 2020.
Source: goalzz.com

==== Results by round ====
Round	1	2	3	4	5	6	7	8	9	10	11	12	13	14	15	16	17	18	19	20	21	22	23	24	25	26	27	28	29	30
Ground	A	H	A	H	H	A	H	A	H	A	H	A	H	A	H	H	A	H	A	A	H	A	H	A	H	A	H	A	H	A
Result	L	D	L	W	D	L	D	L	W	L	L	D	L	L	D	W	D	L	L	L	D	W	D	W	D	W	W	D	D	L
Position	15	10	10	11	12	13	13	13	9	15	15	14	15	15	15	15	15	15	15	15	15	15	15	13	13	15	14	13	14	14

Updated to match(es) played on 10 October 2020. Source: goalzz.com
A = Away; H = Home; W = Win; D = Draw; L = Loss

==== Matches ====
14 September 2019 1	Fath US	1–0	IR Tanger	Rabat
20:00 UTC+1	Jaadi (yellow card) 6'; Guidileye (yellow card) 41'; Badamosi 62'	Report	(yellow card) 6' Asstati; (yellow card) 70' Ait El Haj; (yellow card) 74' Jarfi; (yellow card) 80' Chentouf	Stadium: Stade Moulay Hassan; Attendance: 4.000; Referee: abderrahim arrakhiz

22 September 2019 2	IR Tanger	0–0	DH Jadidi	Tangier
20:00 UTC+1	Jarfi (yellow card) 35'	Report	Dahbi (yellow card) 62'; N'Diaye (penalty missed) 73'	Stadium: Stade Ibn Batouta; Attendance: 20.000; Referee: Hicham Temsamani

27 October 2019 5	IR Tanger	0–0	MC Oujda	Tangier
19:00 UTC+1	Sadil (red card) 36'	Report	Khafifi (red card) 36'; Diakite (yellow card) 64' (yellow-red card) 90+2'	Stadium: Stade Ibn Batouta; Attendance: 24.000; Referee: Noureddine Jaafari

6 November 2019 3	Wydad AC	4–0	IR Tanger	Casablanca
19:00 UTC+1	El Kaabi 12', 66'; El Moutaraji 21' (yellow card) 22'; Jabrane (yellow card) 69'; Babatunde 71'	Report	Astati (yellow card) 32'	Stadium: Stade Mohammed V Attendance: 32.000; Referee: Yassine Bouslim
Note: The match, originally scheduled for 2 October 2019, was pushed back because of the involvement of Wydad Casablanca at the 2019–20 Arab Club Champions Cup

23 November 2019 4	IR Tanger	2–0	CAY Berrechid	Tangier
16:00 UTC+1	Aarab 11'; Gaadaoui (yellow card) 69'; Mukoko (yellow card) 82'; Astati 90+2' (pen.)	Report	Aboulfath (yellow card) 37'; Chaina (yellow card) 41'	Stadium: Stade Ibn Batouta; Attendance: 4.000; Referee: AbdelAziz Lamssalek
Note: The match, originally scheduled for 20 October 2019, was pushed back because of the involvement of Ittihad Tanger at the 2019 Moroccan Throne Cup

29 November 2019 8	AS FAR	4–1	IR Tanger	Rabat
19:00 UTC+1	Chabani (yellow card) 35'; Errahouli 56'; Amimi 61' (pen.); Konadu 67'; El Fakih 74' (pen.) (yellow card) 75'	Report	Mukoko (yellow card) 42'; Mrabet (yellow card) 60'; Gaadaoui (yellow card) 75' (goal) 79'	Stadium: Prince Moulay Abdellah Stadium; Attendance: 12.000; Referee: Nabil Benrakia

4 December 2019 7	IR Tanger	1–1	OC Khouribga	Tangier
19:00 UTC+1	Aarab 13'; Astati (yellow card) 54'; Jarfi (yellow card) 76'; Alharaish (yellow card) 79'; Sadil (yellow card) 89'	Report	Hajhouj 47'	Stadium: Stade Ibn Batouta; Attendance: 2.500; Referee: Jalal Jayed
Note: The match, originally scheduled for 24 November 2019, was pushed back because Ittihad Tangier played the postponed match from the 4the round.

8 December 2019 9	IR Tanger	1–0	R Beni Mellal	Tangier
19:00 UTC+1	Anouar (yellow card) 68' (goal) 86'; Mukoko (yellow card) 90+2'	Report	Baaouch (yellow card) 57'	Stadium: Stade Ibn Batouta; Attendance: 7.000; Referee: Slimane El Atifi

17 December 2019 6	RS Berkane	2–0	IR Tanger	Berkane
17:00 UTC+1	Najji (yellow card) 29'; Dayo 60'; Laachir (yellow card) 64' (goal) 84'	Report	Mukoko (yellow card) 45+1'	Stadium: Stade Municipal de Berkane; Attendance: 4.000; Referee: Yassine Bouslim
Note: The match, originally scheduled for 3 November 2019, was pushed back because of the involvement of Nahdat Berkane at the 2019–20 CAF Confederation Cup

22 December 2019 10	RCA Zemamra	1–0	IR Tanger	Zemamra
17:00 UTC+1	El Bahri 30'; Kiani (yellow card) 77'; Serrhat (yellow card) 87'	Report	Astati (yellow card) 34'; Jayed (yellow card) 42'; Gaadaoui (yellow card) 81'	Stadium: Stade Ahmed Choukri; Referee: Mustapha Kachaf

11 January 2020 12	MA Tétouan	0–0	IR Tanger	Tétouan
15:00 UTC+1		Report	Hanaoui (yellow card) 65'	Stadium: Stade Saniat Rmel; Attendance: 15.000; Referee: Samir Guezzaz

15 January 2020 11	IR Tanger	1–4	Raja CA	Tangier
19:00 UTC+1	El Amraoui 45+4' (pen.); Mhannaoui (yellow card) 48'	Report	Malango 31', 66'; Benhalib 36', 49'; Soukhal (yellow card) 73'; Arjoune (yellow card) 90+5'	Stadium: Stade Ibn Batouta; Attendance: 25.000; Referee: Daki Radad
Note: The match, originally scheduled for 27 December 2019, was pushed back because of the involvement of Raja Casablanca at the 2019–20 CAF Champions League

23 January 2020 13	IR Tanger	1–2	OC Safi	Tangier
19:00 UTC+1	Fortes (penalty missed) 72'; El Moudane 80'	Report	Sabbar 33' (yellow card) 79'; Boudali 35'; Khaba (yellow card) 43'	Stadium: Stade Ibn Batouta; Attendance: 4.000; Referee: Noureddine El Jaafari

31 January 2020 15	IR Tanger	0–0	RC Oued Zem	Tangier
19:00 UTC+1		Report		Stadium: Stade Ibn Batouta; Attendance: 10.000; Referee: Jalal Jayed

5 February 2020 14	HUS Agadir	2–1	IR Tanger	Agadir
19:00 UTC+1	El Berkaoui 34', 78' (pen.) (yellow card) 35'; Mané (yellow card) 45'; Oubila (yellow card) 66'; Atassi (yellow card) 90+2'; El Houassli (yellow card) 90+5'	Report	Konaté 40'; Aarab (yellow card) 62'; El Mejhed (yellow card) 75'	Stadium: Stade Adrar; Attendance: 9.000; Referee: Hamza El Fareq
Note: The match, originally scheduled for 26 January 2020, was pushed back because of the involvement of Hassania Agadir at the 2019–20 CAF Confederation Cup

14 February 2020 16	IR Tanger	2–1	Fath US	Tangier
17:00 UTC+1	Mouaoui (yellow card) 9'; El Moudane 41' (pen.), 90+3' (yellow card) 45'; El Asbahi (yellow card) 90'	Report	Limouri (yellow card) 40'; Ait Khorsa (yellow card) 52'; Zerhouni 84' (yellow card) 87'	Stadium: Stade Ibn Batouta; Attendance: 11.000; Referee: Redouane Jiyed
Note: The first match ever in the Botola using Video assistant referee (VAR) Technology, Mustapha Kachaf was the VAR referee.

22 February 2020 17	DH Jadidi	1–1	IR Tanger	El Jadida
16:00 UTC+1	Hadhoudi 30'; N'Diaye (yellow card) 82'	Report	Konaté 4'; Sadil (yellow card) 15'; Bezghoudi (yellow card) 19'; Aarab (yellow card) 46'	Stadium: Stade El Abdi; Attendance: 3.000; Referee: Slimane Elaatifi

2 March 2020 19	CAY Berrechid	3–0	IR Tanger	Berrechid
19:00 UTC+1	Aboulfath (yellow card) 14'; Niani 21'; Oggadi (yellow card) 23'; Ait Ourehbi 73' (pen.); Talbi (yellow card) 41'; Fati 49' (pen.); Taik (yellow card) 90+1'	Report	Astati (yellow card) 45'	Stadium: Stade Municipal de Berrechid; Attendance: 1.750; Referee: Samir Guezzaz

7 March 2020 20	MC Oujda	1–0	IR Tanger	Oujda
18:00 UTC+1	Sadaoui (yellow card) 25' (goal) 55' (pen.); Khafi (yellow card) 77'	Report	Jarfi (yellow card) 20'; El Moudane (yellow card) 47' (yellow-red card) 74'; Anouar (yellow card) 68'	Stadium: Honneur Stadium; Attendance: 0 Referee: AbdelAziz Lamssalek
Note: The match played behind closed doors due to the COVID-19 pandemic.

12 March 2020 18	IR Tanger	0–2	Wydad AC	Tangier
16:00 UTC+1	Astati (yellow card) 73'; Khallati (yellow card) 77'	Report	Haddad (yellow card) 7'; Jabrane (yellow card) 22' (goal) 90+1' (pen.); Nahiri 63'; Aouk (yellow card) 73'	Stadium: Stade Ibn Batouta; Attendance: 0 Referee: Adil Zourak
Note: The match, originally scheduled for 27 February 2020, was pushed back because of the involvement of Wydad Casablanca at the 2019-20 CAF Champions League. It was played behind closed doors due to the COVID-19 pandemic.

2 September 2020 26	Raja CA	0–1	IR Tanger	Casablanca
20:00 UTC+1	Achchakir (yellow card) 60'	Report	El Ouahabi (yellow card) 56'; Anouar 73'	Stadium: Stade Mohammed V Attendance: 0 Referee: Daki Radad
Note: The match was postponed due to the COVID-19 pandemic. The match was rescheduled for 30 August 2020, but was postponed again after 24 members of the team - including 16 players - were infected with COVID-19. It was played behind closed doors.

8 September 2020 22	OC Khouribga	0–1	IR Tanger	Khouribga
22:00 UTC+1	Lahlali (yellow card) 43'; Tachtach (yellow card) 88'; El Mouatani (yellow card) 90+2'	Report	Bezghoudi 79'	Stadium: Complexe OCP; Attendance: 0 Referee: Karim Sabri
Note: The match was postponed due to the COVID-19 pandemic. The match was rescheduled for 14 August 2020, but was postponed again after 24 members of the team - including 16 players - were infected with COVID-19. It was played behind closed doors.

13 September 2020 21	IR Tanger	1–1	RS Berkane	Tangier
22:00 UTC+1	Jayed (yellow card) 40'; El Ouahabi 53'	Report	Laachir 31'; Dayo (yellow card) 84'; Naji (yellow card) 84'	Stadium: Stade Ibn Batouta; Attendance: 0 Referee: Mustapha Kachaf
Note: The match, originally scheduled for 16 March 2020, was postponed due to the COVID-19 pandemic. The match was rescheduled for 11 August 2020, but was postponed again after 24 members of the team - including 16 players - were infected with COVID-19. It was played behind closed doors.

16 September 2020 23	IR Tanger	1–1	AS FAR	Tangier
19:15 UTC+1	Al Asbahi (yellow card) 33'; El Moudane 61' (pen.) (yellow card) 75'	Report	Slim 12' (pen.); Errahouli (yellow card) 56' (yellow-red card) 63'; Lekred (yellow card) 90+2'; Diney (yellow card) 90+4'; Toungara (yellow card) 90+5'	Stadium: Stade Ibn Batouta; Attendance: 0 Referee: Hicham Temsamani
Note: The match was postponed due to the COVID-19 pandemic. The match was rescheduled for 18 August 2020, but was postponed again after 24 members of the team - including 16 players - were infected with COVID-19. It was played behind closed doors.

20 September 2020 24	R Beni Mellal	0–1	IR Tanger	Beni Mellal
17:00 UTC+1	Hajjar (yellow card) 36'; Dahmani (yellow card) 39'	Report	Khallati 35'; Astati (yellow card) 53'; El Moudane (yellow card) 83'	Stadium: Honneur Stadium; Attendance: 0 Referee: Nabil Benrakia
Note: The match was postponed due to the COVID-19 pandemic. The match was rescheduled for 23 August 2020, but was postponed again after 24 members of the team - including 16 players - were infected with COVID-19. It was played behind closed doors.

23 September 2020 25	IR Tanger	0–0	RCA Zemamra	Tangier
19:15 UTC+1	Mukoko (yellow card) 24'; Chibi (yellow card) 34'; Astati (yellow card) 88'	Report	Rabbih (yellow card) 4'; El Houasli (yellow card) 89'	Stadium: Stade Ibn Batouta; Attendance: 0 Referee: Samir Guezzaz
Note: The match was postponed due to the COVID-19 pandemic. The match was rescheduled for 26 August 2020, but was postponed again after 24 members of the team - including 16 players - were infected with COVID-19. It was played behind closed doors.

30 September 2020 27	IR Tanger	1–0	MA Tétouan	Tangier
19:00 UTC+1	Ijroten 46'; Chibi (red card) 51'; Aarab (yellow card) 67'; El Ouahabi (yellow card) 90+2'; El Mejhed (yellow card) 90+5'	Report	Safsafi (yellow card) 14'; Bengoa (yellow card) 67'	Stadium: Stade Ibn Batouta; Attendance: 0 Referee: Mustapha Kachaf
Note: The match was postponed due to the COVID-19 pandemic. It was played behind closed doors.

3 October 2020 28	OC Safi	0–0	IR Tanger	Safi
19:00 UTC+1	Attouchi (yellow card) 26'	Report	El Asbahi (yellow card) 55'; El Mejhed (yellow card) 90+5'	Stadium: Stade El Massira; Attendance: 0 Referee: Jalal Jayed
Note: The match was postponed due to the COVID-19 pandemic. It was played behind closed doors.

7 October 2020 29	IR Tanger	0–0	HUS Agadir	Tangier
19:00 UTC+1	Aarab (yellow card) 79'	Report	Asmoun (yellow card) 86'; El Mallouki (yellow card) 90+2'	Stadium: Stade Ibn Batouta; Attendance: 0 Referee: Karim Sabri
Note: The match was postponed due to the COVID-19 pandemic. It was played behind closed doors.

10 October 2020 30	RC Oued Zem	5–3	IR Tanger	Oued Zem
17:00 UTC+1	El Bahraoui 22', 39', 60', 85'; Tahloucht 26'; El Jaaouanni (yellow card) 33'; Hasty (yellow card) 72'	Report	Chibi 55', 77'; Faouzi 74'	Stadium: Stade Municipal; Attendance: 0 Referee: Mustapha Kachaf
Note: The match was postponed due to the COVID-19 pandemic. It was played behind closed doors.

==== Results overview ====
Locations of the 2018–19 Botola teams

Win Draw Loss

Region	Team	Home score	Away score	Aggregate
Casablanca-Settat	Difaâ El Jadidi	0–0	1–1	1–1
Casablanca-Settat	Nahdat Zemamra	0–0	1–0	0–1
Casablanca-Settat	Raja Casablanca	1–4	0–1	2–4
Casablanca-Settat	Wydad Casablanca	0–2	4–0	0–6
Casablanca-Settat	Youssoufia Berrechid	2–0	3–0	2–3
Béni Mellal-Khénifra	Olympique Khouribga	1–1	0–1	2–1
Béni Mellal-Khénifra	Raja Beni Mellal	1–0	0–1	2–0
Béni Mellal-Khénifra	Rapide Oued Zem	0–0	5–3	3–5
Oriental	Mouloudia Oujda	0–0	1–0	0–1
Oriental	Nahdat Berkane	1–1	2–0	1–3
Rabat-Salé-Kénitra	AS FAR	1–1	4–1	2–5
Rabat-Salé-Kénitra	Fath Union Sport	2–1	1–0	2–2
Tanger-Tetouan-Al Hoceima	Moghreb Tétouan	1–0	0–0	1–0
Marrakech-Safi	Olympic Safi	1–2	0–0	1–2
Souss-Massa	Hassania Agadir	0–0	2–1	1–2

=== Throne Cup ===
1 September 2019 Round of 32	CR Al Hoceima	1–3	IR Tanger	Al Hoceima
16:30 UTC+1	Burjou 74'		Ed-dyb 14', 37'; Youssef 46'	Stadium: Stade Mimoun Al Arsi; Referee: Jamal Belbassri

27 September 2019 Round of 16	IR Tanger	1–0 (a.e.t.)	Fath US	Tangier
20:00 UTC+1	Astati (yellow card) 51'; Konaté (yellow card) 90+2'; Al Taher 115' (pen.)		Ait Khorsa (yellow card) 38'; Zerhouni (yellow card) 81'; Jaadi (yellow card) 115'	Stadium: Stade Ibn Batouta; Referee: Mustapha Kechaf

22 October 2019 Quarter-finals	IR Tanger	0–1 (a.e.t.)	HUS Agadir	Tangier
16:00 UTC+1	Aarab (yellow card) 47'		Malick (yellow card) 17'; Chaouch (yellow card) 90+1'; Bouftini 105' (pen.) (yellow card) 120+1'; Seyam (yellow card) 120+1'	Stadium: Stade Ibn Batouta; Referee: Samir Guezzaz

=== Arab Club Champions Cup ===
==== Preliminary round ====
===== Group A =====
Pos	Team	Pld	W	D	L	GF	GA	GD	Pts	Qualification
1	(Bahrain) Al-Riffa	3	3	0	0	8	0	+8	9	Advance to First round
2	(Morocco) Ittihad Tanger	3	2	0	1	9	3	+6	6	
3	(Iraq) Al-Zawraa	3	1	0	2	2	4	−2	3	
4	(Somalia) Horseed	3	0	0	3	1	13	−12	0	

Updated to match(es) played on 24 August 2019. Source: Goalzz
Rules for classification: 1) Points; 2) Goal difference; 3) Goals scored.

18 August 2019 1	IR Tanger (Morocco)	0–2	(Bahrain) Riffa SC	Casablanca, Morocco
21:00 UTC+1	Aarab (yellow card) 20'; Ait El Haj (yellow card) 82'	Report	(yellow card) 44' Hareb; (penalty missed) 71', 71' Al Aswad; 79' Hashim	Stadium: Stade Mohammed V Referee: Adel Ali Al Naqbi (United Arab Emirates)

21 August 2019 2	IR Tanger (Morocco)	3–0	(Iraq) Al-Zawraa SC	Casablanca, Morocco
21:00 UTC+1	Ait El Haj (yellow card) 19'; Echaraf 26'; El Amraoui 28' (yellow card) 62'; Al Taher 60' (pen.); Mukoko (red card) 71'; El Mejhed (yellow card) 81'	Report	(yellow card) 69'; (yellow card) 81' Zghir; (yellow card) 89' Al-Saedi	Stadium: Stade Mohammed V Referee: Amin Mohamed Omar (Egypt)

24 August 2019 3	Horseed FC (Somalia)	1–6	(Morocco) IR Tanger	El Jadida, Morocco
19:00 UTC+1	Mohamad (yellow card) 37'; Abd Al Kader	Report	9', 18' (pen.) Ed-dyb; 34' Aarab; (yellow card) 38' Camara; 42', 45+2', (yellow card) 81' Youssef; 74' Chentouf	Stadium: Stade El Abdi; Referee: Hamad Al-Ali (United Arab Emirates)

== See also ==
- 2015–16 IR Tanger season
- 2016–17 IR Tanger season
- 2017–18 IR Tanger season
- 2018–19 IR Tanger season
