= 2018–19 IR Tanger season =

Tanger
2018–19 season
- President: Abdelhamid Abarchan
- Manager: Driss El Mrabet (until 25 September); Ahmad Al-Ajlani (until 26 December); Abdelouahed Belqassem
- Stadium: Stade Ibn Batouta
- Botola: 5th
- Moroccan Throne Cup: Round of 16
- CAF Champions League: First round
- CAF Confederation Cup: Play-off round
- Top goalscorer: League: Naghmi (9); All: Naghmi (9)
- Highest home attendance: 34,000 vs DH Jadidi (23 February 2019)
- Lowest home attendance: 6,000 vs OC Safi (13 May 2019)
- Average home league attendance: 17,877
Home colours	Away colours	Third colours

The 2018–19 season is Ittihad Riadi Tanger's 36th in existence and the club's 20th season in the top flight of Moroccan football, and fourth consecutive in the first division after promotion. The team participated in CAF Champions League for the first time in his history after winning the Botola title in the 2017–18 season.

== Kit ==
Supplier: Gloria Sport / Club Sponsor: front: Moroccan Airports Authority, Renault, APM Terminals, Tanger-Med; back: Valencia; sleeves: STG Telecom; short: RCI Finance Maroc / League Sponsor: front: Maroc Telecom.

Home	Away	Third

== Season review ==
=== May ===
On 27 May, the club completed the transfer of 26-year-old Midfielder Hamza Jelassi from CA Bizertin on a three-year contract.

=== June ===
On 8 June, Ittihad Tanger and Hugo Almeida agreed to mutually terminate the Brazilian's contract.

On 12 June, the club completed the transfer of 27-year-old forward Omar Eddahri on a three-year contract.

On 14 June, Al Kharaitiyat centre-back Aurelien Josue Mohy signed on a season-long loan. And the club completed the transfer of the player Omar Najdi for one-year contract. And the club also announced the signing of the winger Abdelkabir El Ouadi coming from Raja Casablanca for three-year contract.

=== July ===
On 3 July, the club completed the transfer of 28-year-old Forward Salva Chamorro from UD Logroñés for two years.

On 7 July, Ittihad Tanger announces the termination the contract of the players Yassine Lebhiri and Khalid Serroukh at their request.

On 10 July, the club completed the transfer of four players; Mohamed Zghino from Mouloudia Oujda for five year, Abdelelah Erroubia from Chabab Houara for four years, Ayoub Gaadaoui from Chabab Atlas Khénifra for three years, and Benaissa Benamar from Jong FC Twente for five years.

On 15 July, Ittihad Tanger reached an agreement with the Saudi club Al-Raed FC to loan Ahmed Hammoudan for a year worth $350,000, with the possibility of buying the contract at the end of the loan period.

On 20 July, the club confirmed the transfer of Yasser Imrani to Wydad Fès on a season-long loan.

On 24 July, Ittihad Tanger announces the termination the contract of the players Pablo Ganet, Anas Aqachmar and Mohammed Amine Ennali.

On 25 July, the club announces the termination the contract of the player Omar Eddahri at his request.

On 25 July, The club loaned three of its players: Ayman Ben Ali and Zakaria Boulaich to Raja Beni Mellal, and Younes Ed-dyb to Olympique Dcheira for one year.

On 31 July, Ittihad Tanger announced that they had reached an agreement with Dragon Club for the transfer of Rostand Junior M'baï for a transfer fee of €100,000. The player will sign a contract for the next four seasons until the end of 2021–22.

=== August ===
On 7 August, Ittihad Tanger completed the transfer of the 24 years midfielder Soufian Echcharaf from Chabab Rif Al Hoceima on a two-year contract.

On 18 August, the club completed the transfer of the 28 years goalkeeper Issam Lahlafi from Chabab Atlas Khénifra on a three-year contract.

=== September ===
On 1 September, Ittihad Tanger completed the transfer of the 37 years midfielder Issam Erraki for one renewable season.

On 17 September, Al-Nassr midfielder Mohamed Fouzair signed on a season-long loan.

On 17 September, the club completed the transfer of the 26 years right-back Mohamed Hamami from Difaâ El Jadidi on a three-year contract.

On 25 September, the club announced Ahmad Al-Ajlani would be the new IRT coach following the departure of Driss El Mrabet.

=== October ===
On 11 October, Ittihad Tanger has introduced its new sponsor STG telecom in a three-year contract for 1,5 million dirhams.

=== December ===
On 18 December, Ittihad Tanger announced that Ousseynou Thioune would be departing the club after three seasons. Ousseynou joined Spanish club Tarragona.

== Players ==
=== Squad ===
As of 4 February 2019

Note: Flags indicate national team as defined under FIFA eligibility rules; some limited exceptions apply. Players may hold more than one non-FIFA nationality.

No.	Pos.	Nation	Player
1	GK	MAR	Salaheddine Chihab ^{*}
2	DF	MAR	Redouane Mrabet (vice-captain)
3	DF	MAR	Hatim El Ouahabi
4	DF	CIV	N'do Didier Pepe
5	MF	MAR	Omar Arjoune
6	MF	MAR	Nouaman Aarab
7	FW	MAR	Mohamed El Amraoui ^{*}
8	DF	MAR	Benaissa Benamar
9	FW	MAR	Hamza Rhattas ^{*}
10	MF	MAR	Rachid Housni
11	FW	MAR	Abdelkabir El Ouadi
12	FW	CMR	Rostand Junior M'baï
13	DF	MAR	Mohamed Hamami
14	MF	MAR	Omar Najdi
15	DF	MAR	Ayoub Jarfi
16	MF	MAR	Ahmed Chentouf

No.	Pos.	Nation	Player
17	FW	MAR	Mehdi Naghmi
18	MF	MAR	Soufian Echaraf
19	FW	MAR	Ayoub Bouraada ^{*}
20	DF	GAB	Stevy Nzambe ^{*}
21	DF	MAR	Ayoub El Khaliqi (3rd captain)
22	GK	MAR	Issam Lahlafi
24	DF	MAR	Noureddine Aboulfarah ^{*}
26	FW	MAR	Abdelelah Erroubia
27	FW	MAR	Ayoub Gaadaoui
29	DF	MAR	Oussama El Ghrib (captain)
33	GK	MAR	Imad Askar ^{*}
55	GK	MAR	Tarik Aouattah (N° 1 in CCL & CCC)
65	GK	MAR	Hicham El Mejhed (N° 23 in CCL & CCC)
77	FW	COD	Mukoko Batezadio ^{*}
99	MF	MAR	Issam Erraki (N° 25 in CCL & CCC)

^{*} Not in the CCL & CCC squad list.

==== Out during the season ====
Note: Flags indicate national team as defined under FIFA eligibility rules; some limited exceptions apply. Players may hold more than one non-FIFA nationality.

No.	Pos.	Nation	Player
9	FW	ESP	Salva Chamorro
10	MF	SEN	Ousseynou Thioune
20	MF	MAR	Mohamed Zghinou

No.	Pos.	Nation	Player
28	DF	CIV	Aurelien Josue Mohy (on loan from Al Kharaitiyat SC)
30	MF	MAR	Mohamed Fouzair (on loan from Al-Nassr FC)

=== Players in ===
N.	Pos.	Name	Age	Moving from	Type	Transfer window	Ends	Transfer fee	Source
13	MF	(Tunisia) Hamza Jelassi	26	(Tunisia) CA Bizertin	Transfer	Summer	2021	Free	IRTfoot.ma
10	MF	(Morocco) Omar Eddahri	27	(Sweden) IK Sirius	Transfer	Summer	2021	Free	IRTfoot.ma
28	DF	(Ivory Coast) Aurelien Josue Mohy	28	(Qatar) Al Kharaitiyat SC	Loan	Summer	2019	Free	IRTfoot.ma
14	FW	(Morocco) Omar Najdi	31	(Egypt) Petrojet SC	Transfer	Summer	2019	Free	IRTfoot.ma
11	FW	(Morocco) Abdelkabir El Ouadi	25	Raja CA	Transfer	Summer	2021	Free	IRTfoot.ma
88	MF	(Morocco) Yasser Imrani	21	AFS Ouislane	Loan return	Summer		Free	
—	MF	(Morocco) Noussair El Maimouni	27	MA Tétouan	Loan return	Summer	2019	Free	
—	MF	(Morocco) Abdelali Assri	22	Widad Juventud	Loan return	Summer		Free	
—	MF	(Morocco) Abdelghafour Jebroun		Widad Juventud	Loan return	Summer		Free	
—	FW	(Morocco) Younes Ed-dyb	24	USM Oujda	Loan return	Summer	2021	Free	
9	FW	(Spain) Salva Chamorro	28	(Spain) UD Logroñés	Transfer	Summer	2020	Free	IRTfoot.ma
20	MF	(Morocco) Mohamed Zghinou	26	MC Oujda	Transfer	Summer	2023	Free	IRTfoot.ma
26	FW	(Morocco) Abdelelah Erroubia	25	CC Houara	Transfer	Summer	2022	Free	IRTfoot.ma
27	FW	(Morocco) Ayoub Gaadaoui	26	CA Khénifra	Transfer	Summer	2021	Free	IRTfoot.ma
8	DF	(Morocco) Benaissa Benamar	21	(Netherlands) Jong FC Twente	Transfer	Summer	2023	Free	IRTfoot.ma
12	FW	(Cameroon) Rostand Junior M'baï	23	(Cameroon) DC Yaoundé	Transfer	Summer	2022	€100.000	IRTfoot.ma
18	MF	(Morocco) Soufian Echaraf	24	CR Al Hoceima	Transfer	Summer	2020	Free	IRTfoot.ma
22	GK	(Morocco) Issam Lahlafi	28	CA Khénifra	Transfer	Summer	2021	Free	IRTfoot.ma
99	MF	(Morocco) Issam Erraki	37	(Saudi Arabia) Al-Raed FC	Transfer	Summer	2019	Free	IRTfoot.ma
30	MF	(Morocco) Mohamed Fouzair	26	(Saudi Arabia) Al-Nassr FC	Loan	Summer	2019	$200.000	IRTfoot.ma
13	DF	(Morocco) Mohamed Hamami	26	DH Jadidi	Transfer	Summer	2021	Free	IRTfoot.ma
77	FW	(Democratic Republic of the Congo) Mukoko Batezadio	26	(Democratic Republic of the Congo) AS Vita Club	Transfer	Winter	2021	$400.000	fb.com/clubirt
10	MF	(Morocco) Rachid Housni	28	Wydad AC	Transfer	Winter	2021	Free	fb.com/clubirt
	MF	(Slovenia) Zeljko Filipovic	30	(Belarus) FC Dynamo Brest	Transfer	Winter		Free	
1	GK	(Morocco) Salaheddine Chihab	19	OC Khouribga	Transfer	Winter	2022	Free	fb.com/clubirt
9	FW	(Morocco) Hamza Rhattas	24	AS Salé	Transfer	Winter	2023	Free	fb.com/clubirt
20	DF	(Gabon) Stevy Nzambe	27	(Eswatini) Mbabane Swallows FC	Transfer	Winter	2021	Free	fb.com/clubirt

=== Players out ===
N.	Pos.	Name	Age	Moving to	Type	Transfer window	Transfer fee	Source
99	FW	(Brazil) Hugo Almeida	32	(Brazil) Paysandu SC	Contract termination	Summer	Free	Paysandu.com.br
1	GK	(Morocco) Ahmed Reda Tagnaouti	22	Wydad AC	End of loan	Summer	Free	
8	MF	(Morocco) Khalid Serroukh	28	OC Khouribga	Contract termination	Summer	Free	IRTfoot.ma
9	MF	(Morocco) Yassine Lebhiri	24	OC Khouribga	Contract termination	Summer	Free	IRTfoot.ma
77	FW	(Morocco) Amine Ennali	21	(Spain) CD San Roque de Lepe	Contract termination	Summer	Free	SanRoqueDeLepe.com
—	MF	(Morocco) Noussair El Maimouni	27	(India) ATK	Contract termination	Summer	? $83.000	twitter.com/WorldATK
11	FW	(Morocco) Ahmed Hammoudan	26	(Saudi Arabia) Al-Raed FC	Loan	Summer	$350.000	IRTfoot.ma twitter.com/alraedclub
88	MF	(Morocco) Yasser Imrani	22	AFS Ouislane	Loan	Summer	Free	
10	MF	(Equatorial Guinea) Pablo Ganet	23	(Spain) CD San Roque de Lepe	Contract termination	Summer	Free	SanRoqueDeLepe.com
18	MF	(Morocco) Anas Aqachmar	22	CA Khénifra	Contract termination	Summer	Free	IRTfoot.ma
10	MF	(Morocco) Omar Eddahri	27	(Sweden) Djurgårdens IF	Contract termination	Summer	Free	DIF.se
—	GK	(Morocco) Ibrahim Chouaybi	20	M Missour		Summer	Free	
—	MF	(Morocco) Abdelghafour Jebroun		USM Aït Melloul	Loan	Summer	Free	
34	DF	(Morocco) Abdelmounim Akhrif	20	USSKM	Loan	Summer	Free	
33	DF	(Morocco) Ayman Ben Ali	20	RB Mellal	Loan	Summer	Free	IRTanger.ma
97	FW	(Morocco) Zakaria Boulaich	21	RB Mellal	Loan	Summer	Free	IRTanger.ma
—	FW	(Morocco) Younes Ed-dyb	24	O Dcheira	Loan	Summer	Free	IRTanger.ma
18	MF	(Tunisia) Hamza Jelassi	26	(Tunisia) CS Sfaxien	Contract termination	Summer	Free	CSS.org.tn
9	FW	(Spain) Salva Chamorro	28	(Greece) Doxa Drama FC	Contract termination	Summer	Free	FCDoxaDramas.gr
22	GK	(Morocco) Mehdi Ouaya	27	WS Témara	Contract termination	Summer	Free	
10	MF	(Senegal) Ousseynou Thioune	25	(Spain) CG Tarragona	Contract termination	Winter	Free	GimnasticDeTarragona.cat
30	MF	(Morocco) Mohamed Fouzair	27	(Saudi Arabia) Ohod C	End of loan	Winter	$300.000	twitter.com/OHOD1936
—	DF	(Morocco) Ayman Ben Ali	21		Contract termination	Winter	Free	
—	DF	(Morocco) Abdelmounim Akhrif	21		Contract termination	Winter	Free	
—	MF	(Morocco) Abdelali Assri	22		Contract termination	Winter	Free	
20	MF	(Morocco) Mohamed Zghinou	25	MAS Fès	Contract termination	Winter	Free	
28	DF	(Ivory Coast) Aurelien Josue Mohy	28	(Qatar) Al Kharaitiyat SC	End of loan	Winter	Free	
	MF	(Slovenia) Željko Filipović	30	(Kazakhstan) FC Atyrau	Transfer	Winter	Free	

=== Technical staff ===
Position	Name
First team head coach	(Morocco) Driss El Mrabet
Assistant coach	(Morocco) Khalid Bahida
Fitness coach	(Morocco) Ahmad Laamoul
Goalkeeping coach	(Morocco) Mohamed Bestara

until 25 September 2018.

Position	Name
First team head coach	(Tunisia) Ahmad Al-Ajlani
1st assistant coach	(Tunisia) Karim Zouaghi
2nd assistant coach	(Morocco) Khalid Bahida
Fitness coach	(Morocco) Saïd Hammouni
Goalkeeping coach	(Morocco) Mohamed Bestara

until 26 December 2018.

Position	Name
First team head coach	(Morocco) Abdelouahed Belqassem
Assistant coach	(Morocco) Khalid Bahida
Fitness coach	(Morocco) Saïd Hammouni
Goalkeeping coach	(Morocco) Mohamed Bestara
Technical Director	(Morocco) Abderrahim Talib

== Statistics ==
=== Squad appearances and goals ===
Last updated on 9 June 2019.

No.	Pos	Nat	Player	Total		Botola		Coupe du Trône		CAF Champions League		CAF Confederation Cup	
No.	Pos	Nat	Player	Apps	Goals	Apps	Goals	Apps	Goals	Apps	Goals	Apps	Goals
Goalkeepers
1	GK	(Morocco) MAR	Salaheddine Chihab	1	-1	1	(-1)	0	(0)	0	(0)	0	(0)
22	GK	(Morocco) MAR	Issam Lahlafi	3	-5	2	(-3)	1	(-2)	0	(0)	0	(0)
33	GK	(Morocco) MAR	Imad Askar	0	0	0	(0)	0	(0)	0	(0)	0	(0)
55	GK	(Morocco) MAR	Tarik Aouattah	21	-14	16	(-12)	1	(0)	4	(-2)	0	(0)
65	GK	(Morocco) MAR	Hicham El Mejhed	13	-17	11	(-14)	0	(0)	0	(0)	2	(-3)
Defenders
2	DF	(Morocco) MAR	Redwan Mrabet	35	1	28	1	1	0	4	0	2	0
3	DF	(Morocco) MAR	Hatim El Ouahabi	3	0	0+2	0	0	0	0	0	0+1	0
4	DF	(Ivory Coast) CIV	N'do Didier Pepe	0	0	0	0	0	0	0	0	0	0
8	DF	(Morocco) MAR	Benaissa Benamar	11	0	5+1	0	0	0	3	0	2	0
13	DF	(Morocco) MAR	Mohamed Hamami	19	0	10+8	0	1	0	0	0	0	0
15	DF	(Morocco) MAR	Ayoub Jarfi	29	1	22	1	2	0	2+1	0	2	0
20	DF	(Gabon) GAB	Stevy Nzambe	17	1	17	1	0	0	0	0	0	0
21	DF	(Morocco) MAR	Ayoub El Khaliqi	33	1	25	1	2	0	4	0	2	0
23	DF	(Morocco) MAR	Mohamed Benfarha	0	0	0	0	0	0	0	0	0	0
24	DF	(Morocco) MAR	Noureddine Aboulfarah	1	0	0+1	0	0	0	0	0	0	0
29	DF	(Morocco) MAR	Oussama El Ghrib	18	1	13	1	2	0	3	0	0	0
Midfielders
5	MF	(Morocco) MAR	Omar Arjoune	23	1	16+2	0	1+1	0	3	1	0	0
6	MF	(Morocco) MAR	Nouaman Aarab	33	1	24+1	0	1+1	0	4	0	2	1
10	MF	(Morocco) MAR	Rachid Housni	9	0	6+3	0	0	0	0	0	0	0
14	MF	(Morocco) MAR	Omar Najdi	6	0	0+3	0	1	0	0	0	0+2	0
16	MF	(Morocco) MAR	Ahmed Chentouf	36	1	12+16	1	1+1	0	3+1	0	1+1	0
18	MF	(Morocco) MAR	Soufian Echaraf	20	1	12+3	1	0	0	0+3	0	2	0
99	MF	(Morocco) MAR	Issam Erraki	18	0	11+1	0	1	0	2+1	0	2	0
Forwards
7	FW	(Morocco) MAR	Mohamed El Amraoui	7	0	1+6	0	0	0	0	0	0	0
9	FW	(Morocco) MAR	Hamza Rhattas	2	0	1+1	0	0	0	0	0	0	0
11	FW	(Morocco) MAR	Abdelkabir El Ouadi	33	5	16+10	4	2	0	2+2	1	1	0
12	FW	(Cameroon) CMR	Rostand Junior M'baï	27	4	12+8	3	0+1	1	2+2	0	0+2	0
17	FW	(Morocco) MAR	Mehdi Naghmi	37	9	23+7	9	2	0	3	0	2	0
19	FW	(Morocco) MAR	Ayoub Bouraada	0	0	0	0	0	0	0	0	0	0
26	FW	(Morocco) MAR	Abdelelah Erroubia	3	0	0+2	0	0	0	0+1	0	0	0
27	FW	(Morocco) MAR	Ayoub Gaadaoui	30	3	19+5	3	0+1	0	2+1	0	2	0
77	FW	(Democratic Republic of the Congo) COD	Mukoko Batezadio	15	0	14+1	0	0	0	0	0	0	0
Players who have made an appearance or had a squad number this season but have left the club
~~9~~	FW	(Spain) ESP	Salva Chamorro	1	0	0+1	0	0	0	0	0	0	0
~~10~~	MF	(Senegal) SEN	Ousseynou Thioune	8	0	2+4	0	2	0	0	0	0	0
~~20~~	MF	(Morocco) MAR	Mohamed Zghinou	0	0	0	0	0	0	0	0	0	0
~~28~~	DF	(Ivory Coast) CIV	Aurelien Josue Mohy	4	0	3	0	0+1	0	0	0	0	0
~~30~~	MF	(Morocco) MAR	Mohamed Fouzair	13	1	8+1	1	1	0	3	0	0	0

=== Goalscorers ===
No.	Pos.	Nation	Name	Botola	Coupe du Trône	Champions League	Confederation Cup	Total
17	FW	(Morocco)	Mehdi Naghmi	9	0	0	0	9
11	FW	(Morocco)	Abdelkabir El Ouadi	4	0	1	0	5
12	FW	(Cameroon)	Rostand Junior M'baï	3	1	0	0	4
27	FW	(Morocco)	Ayoub Gaadaoui	3	0	0	0	3
18	MF	(Morocco)	Soufian Echaraf	1	0	0	0	1
29	DF	(Morocco)	Oussama El Ghrib	1	0	0	0	1
21	DF	(Morocco)	Ayoub El Khaliqi	1	0	0	0	1
20	DF	(Gabon)	Stevy Nzambe	1	0	0	0	1
5	MF	(Morocco)	Omar Arjoune	0	0	1	0	1
6	MF	(Morocco)	Nouaman Aarab	0	0	0	1	1
2	DF	(Morocco)	Redouane Mrabet	1	0	0	0	1
15	DF	(Morocco)	Ayoub Jarfi	1	0	0	0	1
16	MF	(Morocco)	Ahmed Chentouf	1	0	0	0	1
~~30~~	MF	(Morocco)	Mohamed Fouzair	1	0	0	0	1
TOTAL				27	1	2	1	31

=== Assists ===
No.	Pos.	Nation	Name	Botola	Coupe du Trône	Champions League	Confederation Cup	Total
11	FW	(Morocco)	Abdelkabir El Ouadi	3	0	0	1	4
77	FW	(Democratic Republic of the Congo)	Mukoko Batezadio	3	0	0	0	3
5	MF	(Morocco)	Omar Arjoune	1	0	0	0	1
27	FW	(Morocco)	Ayoub Gaadaoui	1	0	0	0	1
17	FW	(Morocco)	Mehdi Naghmi	1	0	0	0	1
99	MF	(Morocco)	Issam Erraki	1	0	0	0	1
12	FW	(Cameroon)	Rostand Junior M'baï	1	0	0	0	1
10	MF	(Morocco)	Rachid Housni	1	0	0	0	1
7	FW	(Morocco)	Mohamed El Amraoui	1	0	0	0	1
16	MF	(Morocco)	Ahmed Chentouf	1	0	0	0	1
2	DF	(Morocco)	Redwan Mrabet	1	0	0	0	1
TOTAL				15	0	0	1	16

=== Clean sheets ===
Last updated on 9 June 2019.

No	Name	Botola	Coupe du Trône	Champions League	Confederation Cup	Total
1	(Morocco) Chihab	0/1	0/0	0/0	0/0	0/1
22	(Morocco) Lahlafi	0/2	0/1	0/0	0/0	0/3
33	(Morocco) Askar	0/0	0/0	0/0	0/0	0/0
55	(Morocco) Aouattah	6/16	1/1	3/4	0/0	10/21
65	(Morocco) El Mejhed	4/11	0/0	0/0	1/2	5/13
Total		10/30	1/2	3/4	1/2	15/38

=== Disciplinary record ===
N	P	Nat.	Name	Botola			Coupe du Trône			Champions League			Confederation Cup			Total			Notes
N	P	Nat.	Name	Yellow card	Second yellow card	Red card	Yellow card	Second yellow card	Red card	Yellow card	Second yellow card	Red card	Yellow card	Second yellow card	Red card	Yellow card	Second yellow card	Red card	Notes
2	DF	(Morocco)	Redwan Mrabet	2						1						3			
3	DF	(Morocco)	Hatim El Ouahabi	1												1			
5	MF	(Morocco)	Omar Arjoune	6	1		1									7	1		
6	MF	(Morocco)	Nouaman Aarab	5												5			
8	DF	(Morocco)	Benaissa Benamar										1			1			
11	FW	(Morocco)	Abdelkabir El Ouadi	1		1										1		1	
12	FW	(Cameroon)	Rostand Junior M'baï	1						1						2			
13	DF	(Morocco)	Mohamed Hamami	2			1									3			
14	MF	(Morocco)	Omar Najdi	1												1			
15	DF	(Morocco)	Ayoub Jarfi	1												1			
16	MF	(Morocco)	Ahmed Chentouf	1												1			
17	FW	(Morocco)	Mehdi Naghmi	2												2			
18	MF	(Morocco)	Soufian Echaraf	1		1										1		1	
20	DF	(Gabon)	Stevy Nzambe	2												2			
21	DF	(Morocco)	Ayoub El Khaliqi	3	1											3	1		
27	FW	(Morocco)	Ayoub Gaadaoui	7												7			
29	DF	(Morocco)	Oussama El Ghrib	2			1			2						5			
55	GK	(Morocco)	Tarik Aouattah	4												4			
65	GK	(Morocco)	Hicham El Mejhed	1												1			
77	FW	(Democratic Republic of the Congo)	Mukoko Batezadio	1												1			
~~10~~	MF	(Senegal)	Ousseynou Thioune	1												1			
~~30~~	MF	(Morocco)	Mohamed Fouzair	2						2						4			

Last updated: 6 June 2019
Source: mountakhab.net
Ordered by (red card) , (second yellow card) and (yellow card)
(yellow card) = Number of bookings; (second yellow card) = Number of sending offs after a second yellow card; (red card) = Number of sending offs by a direct red card.

=== Injury record ===
N	P	Nat.	Name	Type	Status	Source	Match	Inj. Date	Ret. Date
99	MF	(Morocco)	Issam Erraki	Thigh injury		IRT.ma	vs Raja Casablanca	7 November 2018	5 December 2018

- Player is injured
- Player has recovered from injury
Last updated: 5 December 2018
Source: IRTfoot.ma

== Pre-season and friendlies ==
11 July 2018 1	IR Tanger (Morocco)	0–0	(Morocco) Teams of Tangier	Tangier, Morocco
17:00 UTC+1		Report		Stadium: Stade Centre Ziaten

14 July 2018 2	IR Tanger (Morocco)	7–0	(Morocco) Raja Boughaz	Tangier, Morocco
13:00 UTC+1	Chentouf; Chamorro; Jelassi; El Khaliqi; Thioune; Eddahri	Report		Stadium: Stade Centre Ziaten

18 July 2018 3	WA Fès (Morocco)	1–2	(Morocco) IR Tanger	Rabat, Morocco
17:00 UTC+1	Merzak (pen.)		Chamorro	Stadium: Annex Prince Moulay Abdellah Stadium

21 July 2018 4	IR Tanger (Morocco)	2–1	(Morocco) WS Témara	Tangier, Morocco
18:00 UTC+1	Chentouf; Aarab	Report	Goal	Stadium: Annex Stade Ibn Batouta

25 July 2018 5	IR Tanger (Morocco)	3–0	(Morocco) US Kacemie	Tangier, Morocco
18:00 UTC+1	Najdi; Chentouf; El Ouadi	Report		Stadium: Annex Stade Ibn Batouta

27 July 2018 6	IR Tanger (Morocco)	1–0	(Morocco) MAS Fez	Tangier, Morocco
18:00 UTC+1	Naghmi (pen.)	Report		Stadium: Annex Stade Ibn Batouta

5 August 2018 7	Qadsia SC (Kuwait)	0–0	(Morocco) IR Tanger	Kartepe, Turkey
09:00 UTC+1				Stadium: Greenpark Kartepe Fields

8 August 2018 8	Pendik SK (Turkey)	2–1	(Morocco) IR Tanger	Kartepe, Turkey
09:00 UTC+1	Benamar (o.g.)		Najdi	Stadium: Greenpark Kartepe Fields

11 August 2018 9	Kırklareli SK (Turkey)	1–2	(Morocco) IR Tanger	Kartepe, Turkey
09:00 UTC+1	Goal		Naghmi (pen.); El Ouadi	Stadium: Greenpark Kartepe Fields

13 October 2018 12	IR Tanger (Morocco)	1–1	(Morocco) IZ Khemisset	Tangier, Morocco
16:00 UTC+1	M'baï		Goal	Stadium: Stade Ibn Batouta; Attendance: 0

9 March 2019 13	IR Tanger (Morocco)	0–1	(Morocco) MA Tétouan	Tangier, Morocco
15:00 UTC+1			Goal	Stadium: Annex Stade Ibn Batouta

13 April 2019 14	IR Tanger (Morocco)	3–1	(Morocco) Ajax Tanger	Tangier, Morocco
--:-- UTC+1	Goal		Goal	Stadium: Stade Centre Ziaten

=== Hamid El-Hazzaz tournament ===
17 August 2018 Semi-final	OC Safi (Morocco)	1–1 (4–2 p)	(Morocco) IR Tanger	Fez, Morocco
17:30 UTC+1	Goal		Chentouf	Stadium: Fez Stadium
	Penalties
	Penalty scored		Thioune (penalty scored); Chentouf (penalty scored); Mohy (penalty missed); M'baï (penalty missed)

19 August 2018 3rd place	OC Khouribga (Morocco)	1–0	(Morocco) IR Tanger	Fez, Morocco
17:30 UTC+1	El Harrach			Stadium: Fez Stadium

== Competitions ==
Win Draw Loss

=== Overview ===
Competition	First match	Last match	Starting round	Final position	Record							
Competition	First match	Last match	Starting round	Final position	Pld	W	D	L	GF	GA	GD	Win %
Botola	27 August 2018	15 May 2019	Matchday 1	5th	30	9	13	8	27	30	−3	30.00
Throne Cup	2 September 2018	3 October 2018	Round of 32	Round of 16	2	1	0	1	1	2	−1	50.00
Champions League	27 November 2018	23 December 2018	Preliminary round	First round	4	2	1	1	2	2	+0	50.00
Confederation Cup	13 January 2019	19 January 2019	Play-off round	Play-off round	2	0	1	1	1	3	−2	0.00
Total					38	12	15	11	31	37	−6	31.58

Last updated: 9 June 2019.
Source: Competitions

=== Standings ===
Pos	Team	Pld	W	D	L	GF	GA	GD	Pts	Qualification or relegation
3	Hassania Agadir	30	12	9	9	30	22	+8	45 (Note: Head-to-head: Hassania Agadir: 3 points, +2 GD; Olympic Safi: 3 points, −2 GD.)	Qualification for Confederation Cup
4	Olympic Safi	30	12	9	9	37	38	−1	45	Participation in Arab Club Champions Cup (Note: Wydad Casablanca and Raja Casablanca are also participated in the Arab Club Champions Cup.)
5	IR Tanger	30	9	13	8	27	30	−3	40	Participation in Arab Club Champions Cup
6	Youssoufia Berrechid	30	10	9	11	36	37	−1	39 (Note: Head-to-head: Youssoufia Berrechid: 7 points, RS Berkane 5 points, Difaâ El Jadidi 3 points.)	
7	RSB Berkane	30	8	15	7	34	34	0	39	Qualification for Confederation Cup (Note: RS Berkane are Moroccan Throne Cup winners.)

Source: frmf.ma
Rules for classification: 1) Points; 2) Head-to-head points; 3) Head-to-head goal difference; 4) Goal difference; 5) Goals scored; 6) Fair-play points; 7) Play-off.

==== Results summary ====
Overall								Home						Away					
Pld	W	D	L	GF	GA	GD	Pts	W	D	L	GF	GA	GD	W	D	L	GF	GA	GD
30	9	13	8	27	30	−3	40	4	8	3	12	14	−2	5	5	5	15	16	−1

Last updated: 9 June 2019.

==== Results by round ====
Round	1	2	3	4	5	6	7	8	9	10	11	12	13	14	15	16	17	18	19	20	21	22	23	24	25	26	27	28	29	30
Ground	H	A	H	A	H	A	H	A	H	A	A	H	A	H	A	A	H	A	H	A	H	A	H	A	H	H	A	H	A	H
Result	D	D	D	L	D	W	D	D	D	L	W	D	L	W	W	W	W	D	L	W	W	L	D	D	D	W	L	L	D	L
Position	6	9	10	12	12	6	8	10	9	9	7	7	11	10	7	5	3	3	6	3	2	3	3	4	4	3	3	5	5	5

Updated to match(es) played on 9 June 2019. Source:
A = Away; H = Home; W = Win; D = Draw; L = Loss

==== Matches ====
27 August 2018 1	IR Tanger	1–1	RC Oued Zem	Tangier
18:00 UTC+1	El Khaliqi (yellow card) 8'; Naghmi 19' (pen.); Mrabet (yellow card) 46'; Thioune (yellow card) 85'	Report	Boudali 59' (yellow card) 59'; El Mejhdi (yellow card) 77'	Stadium: Stade Ibn Batouta; Attendance: 18.000; Referee: Jamal Belbasri

16 September 2018 2	MC Oujda	1–1	IR Tanger	Rabat
16:00 UTC+1	Ogbugh 28'; Ndao (yellow card) 28'	Report	Gaadaoui (yellow card) 51'; M'baï 76'	Stadium: Prince Moulay Abdellah Stadium; Attendance: 2.000; Referee: Noureddine Jaafari

22 September 2018 3	IR Tanger	1–1	MA Tétouan	Tangier
18:00 UTC+1	Arjoune (yellow card) 12'; El Ouadi 42'; El Ghrib (yellow card) 44'; M'baï (yellow card) 82'	Report	Karouk (yellow card) 15'; Bouchta (yellow card) 52'; Lakhal 69'	Stadium: Stade Ibn Batouta; Attendance: 30.000; Referee: Samir Guezzaz

29 September 2018 4	DH Jadidi	1–0	IR Tanger	El Jadida
16:00 UTC+1	Bemammer 4' (pen.); Hadhoudi (yellow card) 14'; El Megri (yellow card) 74'	Report		Stadium: Stade El Abdi; Attendance: 1.000; Referee: Hicham Tiyazi

20 October 2018 5	IR Tanger	1–1	CR Al Hoceima	Tangier
20:00 UTC+1	Arjoune (yellow card) 49'; M'baï 73'	Report	El Ghanjaoui (yellow card) 38'; Abdelghani 54'; M. El Idrissi (yellow card) 64'; A. El Idrissi (yellow card) 80'; El Houasli (yellow card) 90+3'	Stadium: Stade Ibn Batouta; Attendance: 20.000; Referee: Jalal Jayed

28 October 2018 6	HUS Agadir	0–1	IR Tanger	Agadir
17:00 UTC+1	Daoudi (yellow card) 43'; Baadi (yellow card) 77'	Report	Aouattah (yellow card) 73'; Fouzair 83'	Stadium: Stade Adrar; Attendance: 9.800; Referee: Karim Sabri

7 November 2018 7	IR Tanger	1–1	Raja CA	Tangier
18:00 UTC+1	El Ghrib 45'; Arjoune (yellow card) 57'; Najdi (yellow card) 89'	Report	Haddad (yellow card) 26'; Rahimi (yellow card) 63'; Hafidi (yellow card) 63' (goal) 79'	Stadium: Stade Ibn Batouta; Attendance: 22.000; Referee: Taoufik Gourar

11 November 2018 8	AS FAR	0–0	IR Tanger	Rabat
15:00 UTC	Chibi (yellow card) 37'	Report	Naghmi (yellow card) 77'; Fouzair (yellow card) 86'	Stadium: Prince Moulay Abdellah Stadium; Attendance: 8.000; Referee: Noureddine Jaafari

23 November 2018 9	IR Tanger	0–0	OC Khouribga	Tangier
19:00 UTC+1	Fouzair (yellow card) 38'; Echaraf (yellow card) 45' (red card) 77'	Report	Kalai (yellow card) 15'; Ouchen (yellow card) 17'; El Haki (yellow card) 33'	Stadium: Stade Ibn Batouta; Attendance: 12.000; Referee: Redouane Jiyed

9 December 2018 11	CAY Berrechid	1–2	IR Tanger	Berrechid
15:00 UTC+1	Mujahid (yellow card) 28'; Fati 56' (pen.); Aboulfath (yellow card) 68'	Report	Naghmi 62', 68' (pen.); El Ouahabi (yellow card) 85'	Stadium: Stade Municipal (Berrechid); Attendance: 5.000; Referee: Adil Zourak

19 December 2018 12	IR Tanger	1–1	KAC Marrakesh	Tangier
19:00 UTC+1	Chentouf (yellow card) 33'; Gaadaoui (yellow card) 85'; Naghmi 90+4' (pen.)	Report	Agouzoul (yellow card) 21'; Zahraoui 36'; Najm Eddine (yellow card) 66'; Zaya (yellow card) 83'; Coulibaly (yellow card) 90+3'	Stadium: Stade Ibn Batouta; Attendance: 11.000; Referee: Abderrahim Yagoubi

26 December 2018 13	OC Safi	1–0	IR Tanger	Safi
18:00 UTC+1	Toumi (yellow card) 4'; Goudali (yellow card) 88'; Boua 90' (yellow card) 90+1'	Report		Stadium: Stade El Massira; Attendance: 7.000; Referee: Mohamed Belloute

7 January 2019 10	RS Berkane	2–0	IR Tanger	Berkane
18:00 UTC+1	Laba 34', 50' (pen.); El Hilali (yellow card) 90'	Report	El Ghrib (yellow card) 48'	Stadium: Stade Municipal (Berkane); Attendance: 5.000; Referee: Jalal Jayed
Note: The match, originally scheduled for 30 November 2018, was pushed back because of the involvement of Ittihad Tanger at the 2018–19 CAF Champions League

24 January 2019 14	IR Tanger	1–0	Wydad AC	Tangier
19:00 UTC+1	Naghmi 53'; Aarab (yellow card) 68'; Aouattah (yellow card) 87'; Mukoko (yellow card) 88'; Hamami (yellow card) 90+2'	Report	El Karti (yellow card) 63'; Ounajem (yellow card) 75'; Tagnaouti (yellow card) 80'	Stadium: Stade Ibn Batouta; Attendance: 27.000; Referee: Samir Guezzaz

27 January 2019 15	Fath US	0–2	IR Tanger	Rabat
19:00 UTC+1	Limouri (yellow card) 26'; El Bassil (yellow card) 52'; Louani (yellow card) 85'	Report	Gaadaoui 47'; Mrabet (yellow card) 56'; Aarab (yellow card) 64'; Aouattah (yellow card) 76'; Echaraf 89'	Stadium: Stade Prince Moulay Al Hassan; Attendance: 3.000; Referee: Mustapha Kachaf

2 February 2019 16	RC Oued Zem	0–1	IR Tanger	Oued Zem
17:00 UTC+1	Diarra (yellow card) 26'; Hariss (yellow card) 74'	Report	M'baï 12'	Stadium: Stade Municipal (Oued Zem); Attendance: 7.000; Referee: Adil Zourak

10 February 2019 17	IR Tanger	3–2	MC Oujda	Tangier
19:00 UTC+1	Naghmi 6'; Nzambe 45+2'; Aarab (yellow card) 52'; Gaadaoui (yellow card) 73'; El Khaliqi 87'; Aouattah (yellow card) 90+4'	Report	Berrabeh 8'; Ijroten 48'	Stadium: Stade Ibn Batouta; Attendance: 30.150; Referee: Ibrahim Noureddine

16 February 2019 18	MA Tétouan	1–1	IR Tanger	Tétouan
15:00 UTC+1	Houassi 10'; El Mahssani (yellow card) 59'	Report	El Ouadi 66'	Stadium: Stade Saniat Rmel; Attendance: 15.000; Referee: Jalal Jayed

23 February 2019 19	IR Tanger	0–2	DH Jadidi	Tangier
20:00 UTC+1		Report	Msuva 2', 30'; Karnass (yellow card) 21'; Asstati (yellow card) 38'	Stadium: Stade Ibn Batouta; Attendance: 34.000; Referee: Yassine Bouslim

3 March 2019 20	CR Al Hoceima	2–3	IR Tanger	Al Hoceima
15:00 UTC+1	Hamami 28' (o.g.); Fikri (penalty missed); Bengoa 73'; Amaanan (yellow card) 79'	Report	Mrabet 5'; Gaadaoui 16'; El Ouadi 85'	Stadium: Stade Mimoun Al Arsi; Attendance: 12.000; Referee: Noureddine Jaafari

13 March 2019 21	IR Tanger	1–0	HUS Agadir	Tangier
19:00 UTC+1	Naghmi 45' (pen.) (yellow card) 57'; Arjoune (yellow card) 72' (yellow-red card) 86'; El Ouadi (red card) 90+3'	Report	Kimaoui (yellow card) 38'; Bassaine (yellow card) 44'; Bouftini (yellow card) 45+1'; Daoudi (yellow card) 45+2'; Oubila (red card) 90+3'	Stadium: Stade Ibn Batouta; Attendance: 20.000; Referee: Hicham Tiyazi

3 April 2019 23	IR Tanger	0–0	AS FAR	Tangier
16:00 UTC+1	Nzambe (yellow card) 51'	Report	El Moussaoui (yellow card) 32'; Toungara (yellow card) 65'	Stadium: Stade Ibn Batouta; Attendance: 9.000; Referee: Karim Sabri

7 َApril 2019 24	OC Khouribga	1–1	IR Tanger	Khouribga
18:00 UTC+1	Hajhouj 23'; Hachadi (penalty missed); Kassi (yellow card) 66'	Report	Jarfi (yellow card) 43' (goal) 82'; Gaadaoui (yellow card) 47'; Aarab (yellow card) 88'	Stadium: Complexe OCP; Referee: Mohamed Nhayeh

17 April 2019 22	Raja CA	1–0	IR Tanger	Casablanca
16:00 UTC+1	Hadraf 49'	Report		Stadium: Stade Père Jégo; Attendance: 12.000; Referee: Yassine Bouslim
Note: The match, originally scheduled for 27 March 2019, was pushed back because of the involvement of Raja Casablanca at the 2019 CAF Super Cup

21 April 2019 25	IR Tanger	0–0	RS Berkane	Tangier
18:00 UTC+1	El Khaliqi (yellow card) 50'; Gaadaoui (yellow card) 63'	Report		Stadium: Stade Ibn Batouta; Attendance: 13.000; Referee: Adil Zourak

28 April 2019 26	IR Tanger	1–0	CAY Berrechid	Tangier
18:00 UTC+1	Naghmi 8' (pen.); Hamami (yellow card) 28'; Arjoune (yellow card) 58'; Nzambe (yellow card) 78'; El Khaliqi (yellow card) 82' (yellow-red card) 90+1'; El Ouadi (yellow card) 86'; El Mejhed (yellow card) 90+3'	Report	Fati (yellow card) 22'; Naciri (yellow card) 23'; Moujahid (yellow card) 58'; Chaina (yellow card) 87'	Stadium: Stade Ibn Batouta; Attendance: 9.000; Referee: Hicham Tiyazi

5 May 2019 27	KAC Marrakesh	3–1	IR Tanger	Marrakesh
16:00 UTC+1	Boulacsoute 47'; Coulibaly 87'; Daifi (yellow card) 90+2'; Barrouhou (yellow card) 90+3'; Mihri 90+5'	Report	Aarab (yellow card) 41'; Chentouf 70'	Stadium: Marrakesh Stadium; Attendance: 13.000; Referee: Mustapha Kachaf

12 May 2019 28	IR Tanger	0–2	OC Safi	Tangier
22:00 UTC		Report	Ouattara 28'; Niya (yellow card) 68'; Ait El Haj (yellow card) 74'; Goudali 83'; Cláudio (yellow card) 87'; Lahlali (yellow card) 90+2'	Stadium: Stade Ibn Batouta; Attendance: 6.000; Referee: Hamza Elfarek

17 May 2019 29	Wydad AC	2–2	IR Tanger	Casablanca
22:00 UTC	Haddad (yellow card) 62'; Babatunde 82'; Jabrane (yellow card) 90+4'; Comara 90+6'	Report	Gaadaoui (yellow card) 29' (goal) 41'; Arjoune (yellow card) 69'; Naghmi 89'	Stadium: Stade Père Jégo; Attendance: 12.000; Referee: Redouane Jiyed

9 June 2019 30	IR Tanger	1–3	Fath US	Tangier
20:00 UTC	Gaadaoui (yellow card) 70'; El Ouadi 85'	Report	Bettache (yellow card) 18' (goal) 76'; Zerhouni 33'; Skouma 62'; Ettourabi (yellow card) 68'	Stadium: Stade Ibn Batouta; Attendance: 7.000; Referee: Nabil Benrakia

==== Results overview ====
Locations of the 2018–19 Botola teams

Win Draw Loss

Region	Team	Home score	Away score	Aggregate
Casablanca-Settat	Difaâ El Jadidi	0–2	1–0	0–3
Casablanca-Settat	Raja Casablanca	1–1	1–0	1–2
Casablanca-Settat	Wydad Casablanca	1–0	2–2	3–2
Casablanca-Settat	Youssoufia Berrechid	1–0	1–2	3–1
Tangier-Tétouan-Al Hoceima	Chabab Rif Al Hoceima	1–1	2–3	4–3
Tangier-Tétouan-Al Hoceima	Moghreb Tétouan	1–1	1–1	2–2
Béni Mellal-Khénifra	Olympique Khouribga	0–0	1–1	1–1
Béni Mellal-Khénifra	Rapide Oued Zem	1–1	0–1	2–1
Marrakesh-Safi	Kawkab Marrakech	1–1	3–1	2–4
Marrakesh-Safi	Olympic Safi	0–2	1–0	0–3
Oriental	Mouloudia Oujda	3–2	1–1	4–3
Oriental	RSB Berkane	0–0	2–0	0–2
Rabat-Salé-Kénitra	AS FAR	0–0	0–0	0–0
Rabat-Salé-Kénitra	Fath Union Sport	1–3	0–2	3–3
Souss-Massa	Hassania Agadir	1–0	0–1	2–0

=== Throne Cup ===
2 September 2018 Round of 32	IR Tanger	1–0	MA Tétouan	Tangier
17:00 UTC+1	M'baï 53'; Arjoune (yellow card)		Moudden (yellow card); Al Ayoud (yellow card)	Stadium: Stade Ibn Batouta; Referee: Jalal Jayed

3 October 2018 Round of 16	Wydad AC	2–0	IR Tanger	Casablanca
20:00 UTC+1	Gaddarine 30' (yellow card) 50'; Jebor 34'		El Ghrib (yellow card) 15'; Hamami (yellow card) 84'	Stadium: Stade Mohammed V Referee: Redouane Jiyed

=== CAF Champions League ===
==== Qualifying rounds ====
Win Draw Loss

===== Preliminary round =====
27 November 2018 First leg	IR Tanger (Morocco)	1–0	(Chad) Elect-Sport FC	Tangier, Morocco
20:00 UTC+1	Arjoune 45' (pen.); Fouzair (yellow card) 87'	Report	Issa (yellow card) 21'; G.Issa (yellow card) 80'	Stadium: Stade Ibn Batouta; Referee: Mohamed Adel Elsaid Hussien (Egypt)

5 December 2018 Second leg	Elect-Sport FC (Chad)	0–0 (0–1 agg.)	(Morocco) IR Tanger	N'Djamena, Chad
15:00 UTC+1	Mbangoussoum (yellow card) 71'	Report	El Ghrib (yellow card) 33'; Fouzair (yellow card) 62'	Stadium: Stade Omnisports Idriss Mahamat Ouya; Referee: Douglas Kouete Lemouchele (Cameroon)

===== First round =====
15 December 2018 First leg	JS Saoura (Algeria)	2–0	(Morocco) IR Tanger	Béchar, Algeria
17:45 UTC+1	Hammia 69' (pen.); Khoualed (yellow card) 76'; Konaté 80' (yellow card) 81'	Report	El Ghrib (yellow card) 5'; M'baï (yellow card) 25'; Mrabet (yellow card) 68'	Stadium: August 20, 1955 Stadium; Referee: Boubou Traore (Mali)

23 December 2018 Second leg	IR Tanger (Morocco)	1–0 (1–2 agg.)	(Algeria) JS Saoura	Tangier, Morocco
16:00 UTC+1	El Ouadi 47'; Naghmi (yellow card) 63'	Report	Boulaouidet (yellow card) 21'; Merbah (yellow card) 39'; Natèche (yellow card) 45'; Yahia-Chérif (yellow card) 77'	Stadium: Stade Ibn Batouta; Referee: Sékou Ahmed Touré (Guinea)

=== CAF Confederation Cup ===
==== Qualifying rounds ====
Win Draw Loss

===== Play-off round =====
13 January 2019 First leg	IR Tanger (Morocco)	0–0	(Egypt) Zamalek SC	Tangier, Morocco
16:00 UTC+1		Report	Ibrahim (yellow card) 34'	Stadium: Stade Ibn Batouta; Referee: Celso Alvação (Mozambique)

19 January 2019 Second leg	Zamalek SC (Egypt)	3–1 (3–1 agg.)	(Morocco) IR Tanger	Alexandria, Egypt
19:00 UTC+2	Hassan 45'; El-Said 55' (yellow card) 55'; Obama 85'	Report	Benamar (yellow card); Aarab 50'	Stadium: Borg El Arab Stadium; Referee: Victor Gomes (South Africa)

== See also ==
- 2015–16 IR Tanger season
- 2016–17 IR Tanger season
- 2017–18 IR Tanger season
