= 2022 FIFA Club World Cup =

19th edition of the FIFA Club World Cup in 2022

FIFA Club World Cup Morocco 2022 presented by Visit Saudi كأس العالم للأندية لكرة القدم المغرب 2022

Tournament details
- Host country: Morocco
- Dates: 1–11 February 2023
- Teams: 7 (from 6 confederations)
- Venues: 2 (in 2 host cities)

Final positions
- Champions: (Spain) Real Madrid (5th title)
- Runners-up: (Saudi Arabia) Al-Hilal
- Third place: (Brazil) Flamengo
- Fourth place: (Egypt) Al Ahly

Tournament statistics
- Matches played: 7
- Goals scored: 30 (4.29 per match)
- Attendance: 282,276 (40,325 per match)
- Top scorer(s): (Brazil) Pedro (Flamengo); 4 goals
- Best player: (Brazil) Vinícius Júnior (Real Madrid)
- Fair play award: (Spain) Real Madrid

The 2022 FIFA Club World Cup (officially known as the FIFA Club World Cup Morocco 2022 presented by Visit Saudi for sponsorship reasons) was the 19th edition of the FIFA Club World Cup, a FIFA-organised international club football tournament between the winners of the six continental confederations, as well as the host nation's league champions. The tournament was held from 1 to 11 February 2023 in Morocco.

Chelsea were the defending champions, but they were not able to defend their title as they did not qualify after being eliminated in the quarter-finals of the 2021–22 UEFA Champions League by eventual winners Real Madrid. The Spanish side went on to win the Club World Cup for a record-extending fifth time, beating Al Ahly of Egypt 4–1 in the semi-finals before a 5–3 win over Saudi Arabian side Al-Hilal in the final.

This edition also marked the first time a club from the United States (Seattle Sounders FC) took part in the tournament, therefore also making this edition the first one since the 2005 edition to not feature a Mexican club.

== Background and host appointment ==
While the Club World Cup was typically played annually in December, the 2022 tournament could not take place during this period due to the scheduling of the 2022 FIFA World Cup in Qatar in November and December 2022. This, in conjunction with FIFA's planned future expansion of the Club World Cup, resulted in few public details on whether the 2022 tournament would take place. However, US$20 million was allocated for the Club World Cup in FIFA's 2023 budget. In December 2022, CONCACAF president Victor Montagliani implied the Club World Cup would take place in 2023, but would not be hosted by the United States. On 14 December, FIFA announced the host and tournament dates would be confirmed at the FIFA Council meeting in Doha, Qatar, on 16 December.

In May 2022, UOL Esporte reported that Japan were interested in hosting the tournament, having won hosting rights for the previous tournament before backing out due to the COVID-19 pandemic in Japan. UOL Esporte also reported in August that China were interested in holding the tournament, having originally been chosen to host an expanded Club World Cup in 2021 which was postponed due to scheduling issues caused by the COVID-19 pandemic. In September, Diario AS reported that the United States and the United Arab Emirates, hosts of the previous tournament, were also interested in staging the tournament. In December, Diario AS reported that Morocco, Qatar and the United Arab Emirates were the final contenders to host the tournament. On 16 December 2022, the FIFA Council appointed Morocco as the host for the tournament, and confirmed it would take place from 1 to 11 February 2023. Diario AS also reported that the final of the 2022 AFC Champions League, which had been pushed back to finish in May 2023 due to scheduling issues, would be moved forward to facilitate the scheduling of the 2022 FIFA Club World Cup. However, the AFC confirmed on 23 December 2022 that as the 2022 AFC Champions League would not be completed in time, Al-Hilal would be their representative at the 2022 FIFA Club World Cup as the reigning champions from the 2021 AFC Champions League.

== Qualified teams ==
Location of the teams participating in the 2022 FIFA Club World Cup

Team	Confederation	Qualification	Qualified date	Participation (bold indicates winners)
Entering in the semi-finals
(Brazil) Flamengo	CONMEBOL	Winners of the 2022 Copa Libertadores	29 October 2022	2nd (Previous: 2019)
(Spain) Real Madrid	UEFA	Winners of the 2021–22 UEFA Champions League	28 May 2022	6th (Previous: 2000, **2014**, **2016**, **2017**, **2018**)
Entering in the second round
(Saudi Arabia) Al-Hilal	AFC	Nominated by AFC Champion of the 2021 AFC Champions League (Note: Due to scheduling issues, it was confirmed that the final of the 2022 AFC Champions League, originally scheduled for October 2022, would not be completed until May 2023. As the 2022 FIFA Club World Cup would already be held by that time, the AFC confirmed on 23 December 2022 that Al-Hilal would be their representative at the 2022 FIFA Club World Cup as the reigning champions from the 2021 AFC Champions League.)	23 December 2022	3rd (Previous: 2019, 2021)
(Morocco) Wydad Casablanca	CAF	Winners of the 2021–22 CAF Champions League (Note: Wydad Casablanca also won the 2021–22 Botola, the host domestic league, on 29 June 2022.)	30 May 2022	2nd (Previous: 2017)
(United States) Seattle Sounders FC	CONCACAF	Winners of the 2022 CONCACAF Champions League	4 May 2022	Debut
Entering in the first round
(New Zealand) Auckland City	OFC	Winners of the 2022 OFC Champions League	17 August 2022	10th (Previous: 2006, 2009, 2011, 2012, 2013, 2014, 2015, 2016, 2017)
(Egypt) Al Ahly	CAF (host) (Note: Al Ahly took the host Morocco's slot as Wydad Casablanca won the 2021–22 CAF Champions League.)	Runners-up of the 2021–22 CAF Champions League	16 December 2022 (Note: While Al Ahly were confirmed as finalists of the 2021–22 CAF Champions League with Moroccan club Wydad Casablanca on 14 May 2022, and finished as runners-up on 30 May 2022, their participation was not confirmed until Morocco were appointed as tournament hosts on 16 December 2022.)	8th (Previous: 2005, 2006, 2008, 2012, 2013, 2020, 2021)

== Venues ==
The matches were played at two venues, the Ibn Batouta Stadium in Tangier and the Prince Moulay Abdellah Stadium in Rabat.

Location of the host cities of the 2022 FIFA Club World Cup.	Tangier	Rabat
Location of the host cities of the 2022 FIFA Club World Cup.	Ibn Batouta Stadium	Prince Moulay Abdellah Stadium
Location of the host cities of the 2022 FIFA Club World Cup.	Capacity: 65,000	Capacity: 53,000

== Match officials ==
On 14 January 2023, FIFA announced that six referees, twelve assistant referees and eight video assistant referees were appointed for the tournament.

Confederation	Referees	Assistant referees	Video assistant referees
AFC	Ma Ning (China)	Zhou Fei (China); Zhang Cheng (China)	Fu Ming (China)
CAF	Mustapha Ghorbal (Algeria)	Mokrane Gourari (Algeria); Khalil Hassani (Tunisia)	Rédouane Jiyed (Morocco)
CONCACAF	Iván Barton (El Salvador)	David Morán (El Salvador); Kathryn Nesbitt (United States)	Fernando Guerrero (Mexico)
CONMEBOL	Andrés Matonte (Uruguay)	Nicolás Taran (Uruguay); Martín Soppi (Uruguay)	Nicolás Gallo (Colombia); Juan Soto (Venezuela)
UEFA	István Kovács (Romania)	Vasile Marinescu (Romania); Ovidiu Artene (Romania)	Jérôme Brisard (France); Massimiliano Irrati (Italy); Juan Martínez Munuera (Spain)
UEFA	Anthony Taylor (England)	Gary Beswick (England); Adam Nunn (England)	Jérôme Brisard (France); Massimiliano Irrati (Italy); Juan Martínez Munuera (Spain)

== Squads ==
Each team named a 23-man squad (three of whom had to be goalkeepers). Injury replacements were allowed until 24 hours before the team's first match.

== Matches ==
The draw of the tournament was held on 13 January 2023, 12:00 CET, at the Mohammed VI Football Academy in Salé, Morocco, to decide the matchups of the second round (between the first round winner and teams from AFC, CAF and CONCACAF), and the opponents of the two second round winners in the semi-finals (against teams from CONMEBOL and UEFA). In the second round draw, Wydad Casablanca and the winner of the first round match were pre-allocated to separate fixtures, with their opponents selected from the draw pot. The match kick-off times and venues were confirmed after the draw.

If a match was tied after normal playing time:

- For elimination matches, extra time was played. If still tied after extra time, a penalty shoot-out was held to determine the winner.
- For the match for third place, no extra time would be played, and a penalty shoot-out would be held to determine the winner.

=== Bracket ===
First round
1 February – Tangier
(Egypt) Al Ahly	3
(New Zealand) Auckland City	0

Second round
4 February – Tangier
(United States) Seattle Sounders FC	0
(Egypt) Al Ahly	1
4 February – Rabat
(Morocco) Wydad Casablanca	1 (3)
(Saudi Arabia) Al-Hilal (p)	1 (5)

Semi-finals
8 February – Rabat
(Egypt) Al Ahly	1
(Spain) Real Madrid	4
7 February – Tangier
(Brazil) Flamengo	2
(Saudi Arabia) Al-Hilal	3

Final
11 February – Rabat
(Spain) Real Madrid	5
(Saudi Arabia) Al-Hilal	3
Match for third place
11 February – Tangier
(Egypt) Al Ahly	2
(Brazil) Flamengo	4

All times are local, CET (UTC+1).

=== First round ===
1 February 2023
20:00

Al Ahly (Egypt)	3–0	(New Zealand) Auckland City
El Shahat 45+2'; Sherif 56'; Tau 86'	Report

Ibn Batouta Stadium, Tangier
Attendance: 47,137
Referee: Ma Ning (China)

=== Second round ===
4 February 2023
15:30

Wydad Casablanca (Morocco)	1–1 (a.e.t.)	(Saudi Arabia) Al-Hilal
El Amloud 52'	Report	Kanno 90+4' (pen.)
Penalties
Attiyat Allah (penalty missed); El Amloud (penalty scored); Ounajem (penalty scored); Daoudi (penalty scored)	3–5	(penalty scored) Marega; (penalty scored) Vietto; (penalty scored) Al-Shehri; (penalty scored) Al-Hamdan; (penalty scored) Al-Juwayr

Prince Moulay Abdellah Stadium, Rabat
Attendance: 43,891
Referee: Iván Barton (El Salvador)

4 February 2023
18:00

Seattle Sounders FC (United States)	0–1	(Egypt) Al Ahly
	Report	Magdy 88'

Ibn Batouta Stadium, Tangier
Attendance: 30,589
Referee: Anthony Taylor (England)

=== Semi-finals ===
7 February 2023
20:00

Flamengo (Brazil)	2–3	(Saudi Arabia) Al-Hilal
Pedro 20', 90+1'	Report	S. Al-Dawsari 4' (pen.), 45+9' (pen.); Vietto 70'

Ibn Batouta Stadium, Tangier
Attendance: 42,496
Referee: István Kovács (Romania)

8 February 2023
20:00

Al Ahly (Egypt)	1–4	(Spain) Real Madrid
Maâloul 65' (pen.)	Report	Vinícius 42'; Valverde 46'; Rodrygo 90+2'; Arribas 90+8'

Prince Moulay Abdellah Stadium, Rabat
Attendance: 43,508
Referee: Andrés Matonte (Uruguay)

=== Match for third place ===
11 February 2023
16:30

Al Ahly (Egypt)	2–4	(Brazil) Flamengo
Abdel Kader 38', 60'	Report	Gabriel Barbosa 11' (pen.), 85' (pen.); Pedro 77', 90+1'

Ibn Batouta Stadium, Tangier (Note: The match for third place, originally scheduled to be played at Prince Moulay Abdellah Stadium, Rabat, was moved on 9 February 2023 to Ibn Batouta Stadium, Tangier, in order to preserve the pitch for the final.)
Attendance: 30,216
Referee: Mustapha Ghorbal (Algeria)

=== Final ===
11 February 2023
20:00

Real Madrid (Spain)	5–3	(Saudi Arabia) Al-Hilal
Vinícius 13', 69'; Valverde 18', 58'; Benzema 54'	Report	Marega 26'; Vietto 63', 79'

Prince Moulay Abdellah Stadium, Rabat
Attendance: 44,439
Referee: Anthony Taylor (England)

== Goalscorers ==
Rank	Player	Team	Goals
1	(Brazil) Pedro	(Brazil) Flamengo	4
2	(Uruguay) Federico Valverde	(Spain) Real Madrid	3
2	(Argentina) Luciano Vietto	(Saudi Arabia) Al-Hilal	3
2	(Brazil) Vinícius Júnior	(Spain) Real Madrid	3
5	(Egypt) Ahmed Abdel Kader	(Egypt) Al Ahly	2
5	(Saudi Arabia) Salem Al-Dawsari	(Saudi Arabia) Al-Hilal	2
5	(Brazil) Gabriel Barbosa	(Brazil) Flamengo	2
8	(Morocco) Ayoub El Amloud	(Morocco) Wydad Casablanca	1
8	(Spain) Sergio Arribas	(Spain) Real Madrid	1
8	(France) Karim Benzema	(Spain) Real Madrid	1
8	(Saudi Arabia) Mohamed Kanno	(Saudi Arabia) Al-Hilal	1
8	(Tunisia) Ali Maâloul	(Egypt) Al Ahly	1
8	(Egypt) Mohamed Magdy	(Egypt) Al Ahly	1
8	(Mali) Moussa Marega	(Saudi Arabia) Al-Hilal	1
8	(Brazil) Rodrygo	(Spain) Real Madrid	1
8	(Egypt) Hussein El Shahat	(Egypt) Al Ahly	1
8	(Egypt) Mohamed Sherif	(Egypt) Al Ahly	1
8	(South Africa) Percy Tau	(Egypt) Al Ahly	1

== Awards ==
The following awards were given at the conclusion of the tournament. Vinícius Júnior of Real Madrid won the Golden Ball award.

Golden Ball	Silver Ball	Bronze Ball
(Brazil) Vinícius Júnior (Real Madrid)	(Uruguay) Federico Valverde (Real Madrid)	(Argentina) Luciano Vietto (Al-Hilal)
FIFA Fair Play Award
(Spain) Real Madrid

FIFA also named a man of the match for the best player in each game at the tournament.

Man of the Match
Match	Man of the match	Club	Opponent	Ref.
1	(Egypt) Mohamed Sherif	(Egypt) Al Ahly	(New Zealand) Auckland City	
2	(Egypt) Mohamed Magdy	(Egypt) Al Ahly	(United States) Seattle Sounders FC	
3	(Colombia) Gustavo Cuéllar	(Saudi Arabia) Al-Hilal	(Morocco) Wydad Casablanca	
4	(Saudi Arabia) Salem Al-Dawsari	(Saudi Arabia) Al-Hilal	(Brazil) Flamengo	
5	(Brazil) Vinícius Júnior	(Spain) Real Madrid	(Egypt) Al Ahly	
6	(Brazil) Pedro	(Brazil) Flamengo	(Egypt) Al Ahly	
7	(Brazil) Vinícius Júnior	(Spain) Real Madrid	(Saudi Arabia) Al-Hilal	

== Sponsorship ==
Presenting Partner

- Visit Saudi

FIFA Partners

- Adidas
- Wanda Group

Tournament Supporter

- Orange Morocco
- Betano
- OCP Group
- ONCF

== Broadcasters ==
Territory	Broadcaster	Ref.
Australia	SBS Sport	
Brazil	SporTV, TV Globo, CazéTV	
France	Canal+	
Indonesia	Moji, Vidio, SPOTV	
Italy	Sky Italia	
Mexico	Vix	
Morocco	SNRT	
Philippines	SPOTV	
Spain	Mediaset España	
United States	FOX Sports	
Armenia; Azerbaijan; Belarus; Estonia; Georgia; Ireland; Kazakhstan; Kyrgyzstan; Latvia; Lithuania; Moldova; Tajikistan; Turkey; Turkmenistan; Ukraine; Uzbekistan	Saran Media	
Argentina; Chile; Colombia; Ecuador; Peru; Uruguay; Venezuela	DSports	
