= Ibrahim Bezghoudi =

Moroccan footballer

Personal information
- Full name: Ibrahim Bezghoudi
- Date of birth: June 7, 1983 (age 43)
- Place of birth: Berkane, Morocco
- Height: 1.74 m (5 ft 8 1/2 in)
- Position: Midfielder

Senior career*
Years	Team	Apps	(Gls)
2004–2009	OC Khouribga		
2009–2011	DH Jadidi		
2011–2013	OC Safi	39	(1)
2013–2016	OC Khouribga	71	(17)
2016–2019	AS FAR	72	(17)
2019	CAY Berrechid	6	(0)
2020–2021	IR Tanger	16	(1)

International career^{‡}
2015	Morocco	1	(0)
- * Club domestic league appearances and goals as of October 15, 2021 ‡ National team caps and goals as of January 4, 2021

Ibrahim Bezghoudi (born 7 June 1983) is a Moroccan former footballer player who played as a midfielder. He is a free agent who most recently played for Ittihad Tanger.

Bezghoudi earned one cap for the Morocco national team in 2015.

== Honours ==
=== Club ===
Olympique Khouribga

- Moroccan Throne Cup: 2016
