= Soufian Echaraf =

Dutch-Moroccan footballer

Soufian Echcharaf
Personal information
- Full name: Soufian Echcharaf
- Date of birth: 19 May 1994 (age 32)
- Place of birth: Utrecht, Netherlands
- Height: 1.85 m (6 ft 1 in)
- Position: Midfielder

Youth career
- Elinkwijk
- FC Utrecht
- Vitesse Arnhem

Senior career*
Years	Team	Apps	(Gls)
2013–2015	De Graafschap	45	(1)
2016–2017	Hercules		
2017–2018	CR Al-Hoceima	28	(2)
2018–2020	IR Tanger		
2020–2021	RC Oued Zem		
2022	Sportlust '46		
- * Club domestic league appearances and goals as of 7 August 2018 (UTC)

Soufian Echcharaf (born 19 May 1994) is a Dutch-Moroccan criminal and retired footballer who played as a midfielder.

== Club career ==
He formerly played for De Graafschap, but didn't make the grade and joined amateur side Hercules in summer 2016.

Echcharaf returned to the Netherlands and joined Sportlust '46 in September 2022.

== Personal life ==
In April 2024, Echcharaf was one of 16 Dutch suspects who had to stand trial for his involvement in several ATM bombings in Germany. He was sentenced to four years in prison after he confessed.
