= Rachid Housni =

Moroccan footballer (born 1990)

Rachid Housni رشيد حسني
Personal information
- Date of birth: 2 May 1990 (age 36)
- Place of birth: Sarcelles, France
- Height: 1.77 m (5 ft 10 in)
- Position: Midfielder

Youth career
- 2009–2010: Lormont

Senior career*
Years	Team	Apps	(Gls)
2010–2013	Trélissac	29	(4)
2013–2014	Stade Bordelais	7	(0)
2014	Lormont		
2014–2015	CR Al Hoceima	13	(0)
2015–2018	Wydad Casablanca	15	(3)
2016–2017	→ Nahdat Berkane (loan)	15	(4)
2019	IR Tanger	9	(0)

International career^{‡}
2015–	Morocco	1	(1)
- * Club domestic league appearances and goals as of 20 August 2019 ‡ National team caps and goals as of 19 April 2016

Rachid Housni (Arabic: رشيد حسني; born 2 May 1990) is a Moroccan footballer who plays as a midfielder.

== Club ==
Wydad Casablanca

- Botola:
  - Winner: 2014-2015

== Club career ==
Born in France, Moroccan national Housni played for a number of French clubs in his early career. His first club was Lormont, before joining Trélissac, where he spent 3 years, amassing 29 appearances and 4 goals. A spell at Stade Bordelais and a return to Lormont followed, before he secured a move to Moroccan side Chabab Rif Al Hoceima.

On 12 January 2015, Housni was signed by Wydad Casablanca on a four-and-a-half-year deal.

== International career ==
Housni made his international debut for Morocco on 22 October 2016; scoring in their 4–0 thrashing of Libya in the 2016 African Nations Championship qualification.

== Career statistics ==
=== International ===
As of matches played 11 April 2017.

National team	Year	Apps	Goals
Morocco	2015	1	1
Morocco	2016	0	0
Morocco	2017	0	0
Total		1	1

=== International goals ===
Scores and results list Morocco's goal tally first.

No	Date	Venue	Opponent	Score	Result	Competition
1.	22 October 2015	Stade Olympique de Radès, Radès, Tunisia	Libya	3–0	4–0	2016 African Nations Championship qualification
