= Abdelkabir El Ouadi =

Moroccan footballer

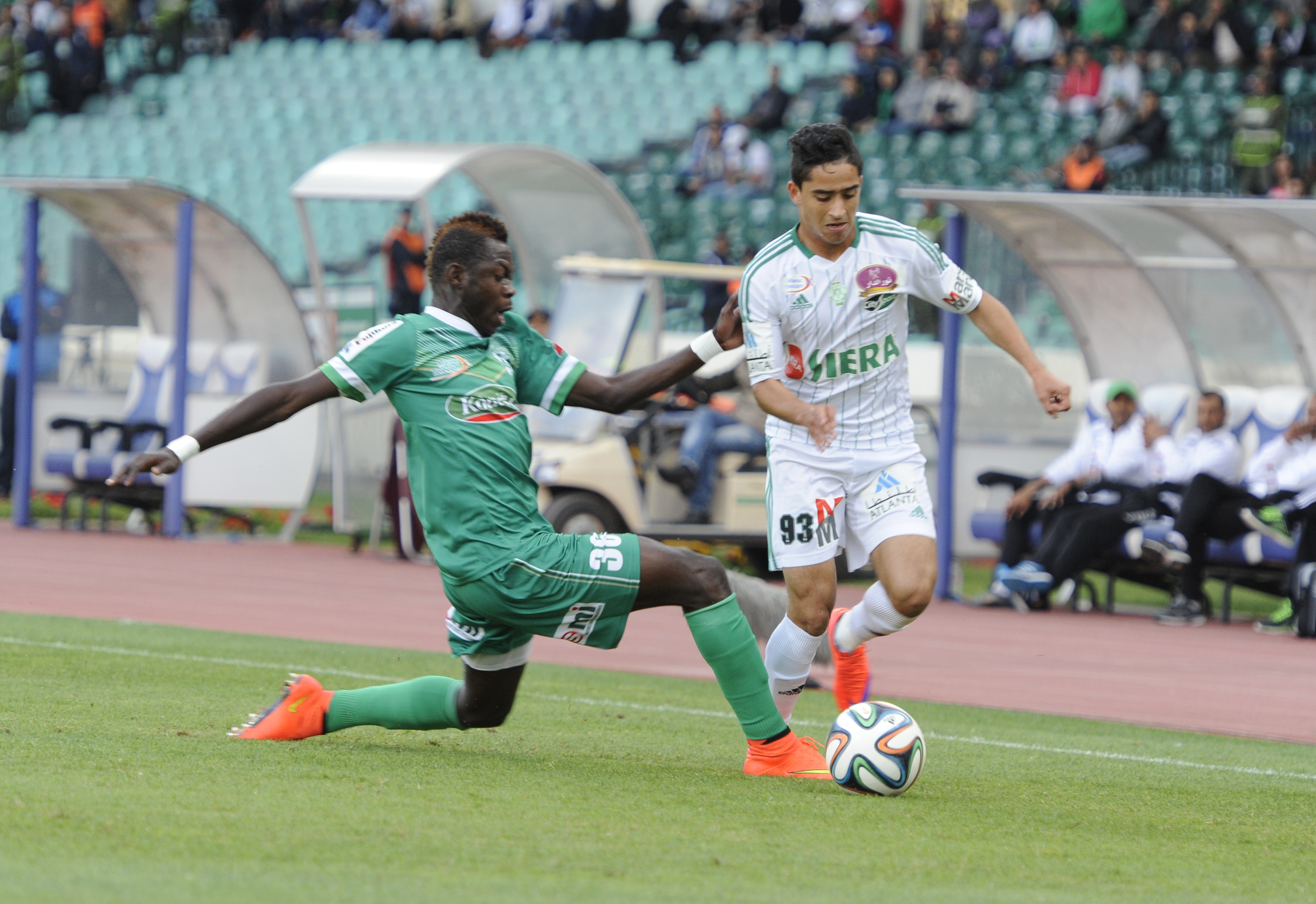
- El Ouadi (right) playing with Raja CA in 2015

Personal information
- Date of birth: 20 February 1993 (age 33)
- Place of birth: Fez, Morocco
- Height: 1.68 m (5 ft 6 in)
- Position: Winger

Team information
- Current team: Modern Sport FC
- Number: 22

Senior career*
Years	Team	Apps	(Gls)
2011–2014	Widad Fès	32	(4)
2014–2018	Raja CA	70	(6)
2017–2018	→ AS FAR (loan)	9	(4)
2018–2019	IR Tanger	30	(5)
2019–2020	Wadi Degla	32	(2)
2020–2022	Smouha SC	58	(12)
2022–	Modern Sport FC	51	(8)

International career
2012–2014	Morocco U20	15	(1)
2014	Morocco U23	5	(0)
2014–	Morocco A'	4	(1)
- * Club domestic league appearances and goals

Abdelkabir El Ouadi (Arabic: عبد الكبير الوادي; born 20 February 1993) is a Moroccan professional footballer who plays as a winger for Future FC.

== International career ==
In January 2014, coach Hassan Benabicha, invited him to be a part of the Morocca squad for the 2014 African Nations Championship. He helped the team to top group B after drawing with Burkina Faso and Zimbabwe and defeating Uganda. The team was eliminated from the competition at the quarter final zone after losing to Nigeria.
