= Jalal Jayed =

Moroccan football referee (born 1987)

- Born: 1987 (age 38–39); Hay Mohammadi, Casablanca, Morocco

Domestic
Years	League	Role
2015–present	Botola Pro	Referee

International
Years	League	Role
2019–present	FIFA listed	Referee

Jalal Jayed (Arabic: جلال جيد; born 1987) is a Moroccan football referee who has been on the FIFA International Referees List since 2019.

== Career ==
Born in Morocco in 1987, Jayed grew up in Derb Moulay Cherif, a neighborhood of Hay Mohammadi, Casablanca. He began refereeing amateur football games on dirt pitches in 2006, when he joined the Grand Casablanca League. In 2015, Jayed ascended to the Botola Pro, Morocco's top-tier football league, where he has overseen highly notable matches like Casablanca and Rabat derbies, as well as the 2023–24 Moroccan Throne Cup final game between RS Berkane and Olympic Club Safi at Fez Stadium in Fez.

In 2025, Jayed was chosen as Morocco's representative at the Africa Cup of Nations in his home country. He refereed the third-place playoff game between Egypt and Nigeria at the Stade Mohammed V in Casablanca. Since being named a FIFA International Referee in 2019, Jayed has also taken part in international competitions, including the 2025 FIFA U-20 World Cup in Chile and the final match of the second round of the CAF qualification for the 2026 FIFA World Cup between Nigeria and DR Congo.

Jayed was selected in April 2026 to take part in the FIFA World Cup in Mexico, the United States, and Canada. He is the first Moroccan to be chosen as a central referee for a FIFA World Cup since 2002, when Mohamed Guezzaz was appointed for the tournament in South Korea and Japan. (Note: Both Maroc Diplomatique and Morocco World News mistakenly reported that Guezzaz was a referee at the 2006 FIFA World Cup.)

On 5 October 2026, the Gulf Football Federation's Referees Committee selected Jayed to officiate the 27th Arabian Gulf Cup Final between Saudi Arabia and United Arab Emirates.

== Selected performances ==
2026 FIFA World Cup – North America
Date	Match	Result	Round	Venue
14 June 2026	Germany – Curaçao	7–1	Group stage	NRG Stadium, Houston
23 June 2026	Portugal – Uzbekistan	5–0	Group stage	NRG Stadium, Houston
29 June 2026	Germany – Paraguay	1–1 (3–4)	Round of 32	Gillette Stadium, Foxborough
