= Omar Arjoune =

Moroccan footballer

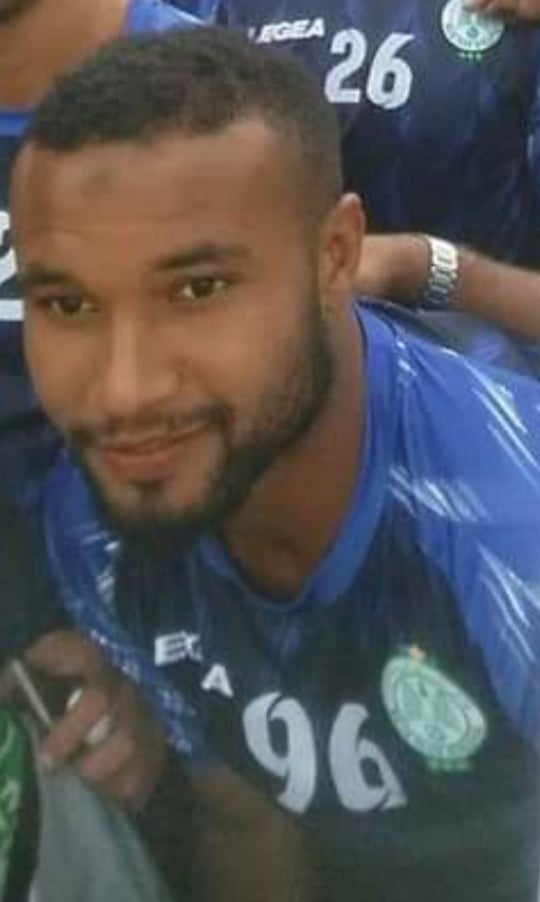
- Arjoune in 2019

Personal information
- Date of birth: 1 February 1996 (age 30)
- Place of birth: Casablanca, Morocco
- Height: 1.74 m (5 ft 9 in)
- Position: Midfielder

Team information
- Current team: Difaâ Hassani El Jadidi
- Number: 3

Senior career*
Years	Team	Apps	(Gls)
2013–2016	Raja CA	20	(1)
2014–2015	→ RS Berkane (loan)		
2016–2017	Youssoufia Berrechid	10	(0)
2017–2019	IR Tanger	37	(2)
2019–2022	Raja CA	104	(1)
2022–2023	Al-Faisaly	29	(0)
2023–2024	RS Berkane	22	(0)
2024–	Difaâ Hassani El Jadidi	27	(4)
- * Club domestic league appearances and goals as of 21:15, 10 May 2025 (UTC)

Omar Arjoune (Arabic: عمر عرجون; born 1 February 1996) is a Moroccan professional footballer who plays as a midfielder for Difaâ Hassani El Jadidi.

== Career ==
On 31 July 2022, Arjoune joined Saudi Arabian club Al-Faisaly on a one-year deal with the option to extend for another.

On 29 July 2023, Arjoune joined RS Berkane.

== Honours ==
IR Tanger

- Moroccan League: 2018

Raja CA

- Moroccan League: 2020
- Confederation Cup: 2021
- Arab Club Champions Cup: 2021
