= Hamza Rhattas =

Moroccan footballer (born 1994)

Personal information
- Full name: Hamza Rhattas
- Date of birth: 8 April 1994 (age 32)
- Place of birth: Kenitra, Morocco
- Height: 1.85 m (6 ft 1 in)
- Position: Forward

Team information
- Current team: Kenitra

Senior career*
Years	Team	Apps	(Gls)
2010–2017	Kenitra		
2017–2018	Oujda		
2018	AS Salé		
2019	Ittihad Tanger	2	(0)
2019–2021	Kenitra		
2021	Olympique Youssoufia		
2021–2022	Khemisset		
2022–2024	Tétouan	31	(5)
2024–2025	Zemamra	7	(2)
2025	Masfout		
- * Club domestic league appearances and goals as of 20 August 2019

Hamza Rhattas (born April 8, 1994), or Hamza Ghatas, is a Moroccan footballer who plays as forward.

== Career statistics ==
As of 5 February 2017

Club	Season	League			Cup		Continental		Other		Total	
Club	Season	Division	Apps	Goals	Apps	Goals	Apps	Goals	Apps	Goals	Apps	Goals
Kenitra	2014–15	Botola	17	0	—		—		—		17	0
Kenitra	2015–16	Botola	12	1	—		—		—		12	1
Kenitra	2016–17	Botola	6	0	—		—		—		6	0
Kenitra	Subtotal		35	1	—		—		—		35	1
Career total			35	1	0	0	0	0	0	0	35	1
