= Stévy Nzambé =

Gabonese footballer

Personal information
- Date of birth: 4 September 1991 (age 35)
- Place of birth: Sinadara, Gabon
- Height: 1.76 m (5 ft 9 in)
- Position: Left back

Senior career*
Years	Team	Apps	(Gls)
2007–2009	USM Libreville		
2009–2010	US Bitam	2	(0)
2010–2011	Troyes II		
2011–2012	Marseille II	13	(0)
2012–2015	AS Mangasport	59	(0)
2015–2016	AS Pélican	6	(4)
2016–2017	AmaZulu		
2017–2018	Real Kings	6	(0)
2018	Mbabane Swallows	1	(0)
2019–2021	IR Tanger	17	(1)
2019–2020	→ Al-Zawraa (loan)		

International career^{‡}
2016–	Gabon	11	(0)
- * Club domestic league appearances and goals as of 00:11, 15 October 2021 ‡ National team caps and goals as of 19:08, 24 December 2019

Stévy Nzambé (born 1991) is a Gabonese professional footballer who plays as a left back for Ittihad Tanger of Morocco. He also plays for the Gabon national football team. He previously played domestically for USM Libreville, US Bitam, AS Mangasport and AS Pélican, spent time with French clubs Troyes and Marseille at junior level, and appeared for AmaZulu and Real Kings of South Africa, Swazi club Mbabane Swallows and Al-Zawraa of Iraq.

== Career ==
He has competed at the 2012 Summer Olympics.

Competing for AmaZulu, Nzambe suffered a fractured skull when he collided with a Real Kings player, placing him in an intensive care unit for some months and having deleterious effects on his health.
