= Mehdi Oubila =

French professional footballer

Personal information
- Date of birth: 17 August 1992 (age 34)
- Place of birth: Morocco
- Position: Midfielder

Team information
- Current team: Hassania Agadir
- Number: 24

Senior career*
Years	Team	Apps	(Gls)
–2015	Chabab Mohamedia		
2015–	Hassania Agadir	144	(15)
- * Club domestic league appearances and goals

Mehdi Oubila is a Moroccan professional footballer who plays as a midfielder for Hassania Agadir.
