= Zakaria Fati =

Moroccan footballer (born 1992)

Personal information
- Date of birth: September 6, 1992 (age 34)
- Place of birth: Casablanca, Morocco
- Height: 1.75 m (5 ft 9 in)
- Position: Winger

Senior career*
Years	Team	Apps	(Gls)
2013–2014	Berrechid		
2014–2016	Raja Beni Mellal		
2016–2017	Khenifra	20	(0)
2017–2018	Berkane	11	(0)
2018–2020	Berrechid	45	(9)
2020–2023	ASFAR	70	(6)
2023–2024	Al-Bukiryah	28	(5)
- * Club domestic league appearances and goals as of 16:41, 11 April 2021 (UTC)

Zakaria Fati (Arabic: زكرياء فاتي; born 6 September 1992) is a Moroccan professional footballer who plays as a winger.

Fati spent his early career in various semi-pro and pro clubs in Morocco. He played for Berrechid, Raja Beni Mellal, Khenifra, and Berkane before signing with ASFAR on 22 October 2020.

On 5 July 2023, Fati joined Saudi First Division side Al-Bukiryah.
