= Tangier Grand Stadium =

Football stadium in Tangier, Morocco

Coordinates: 35°44′28″N 5°51′29″W

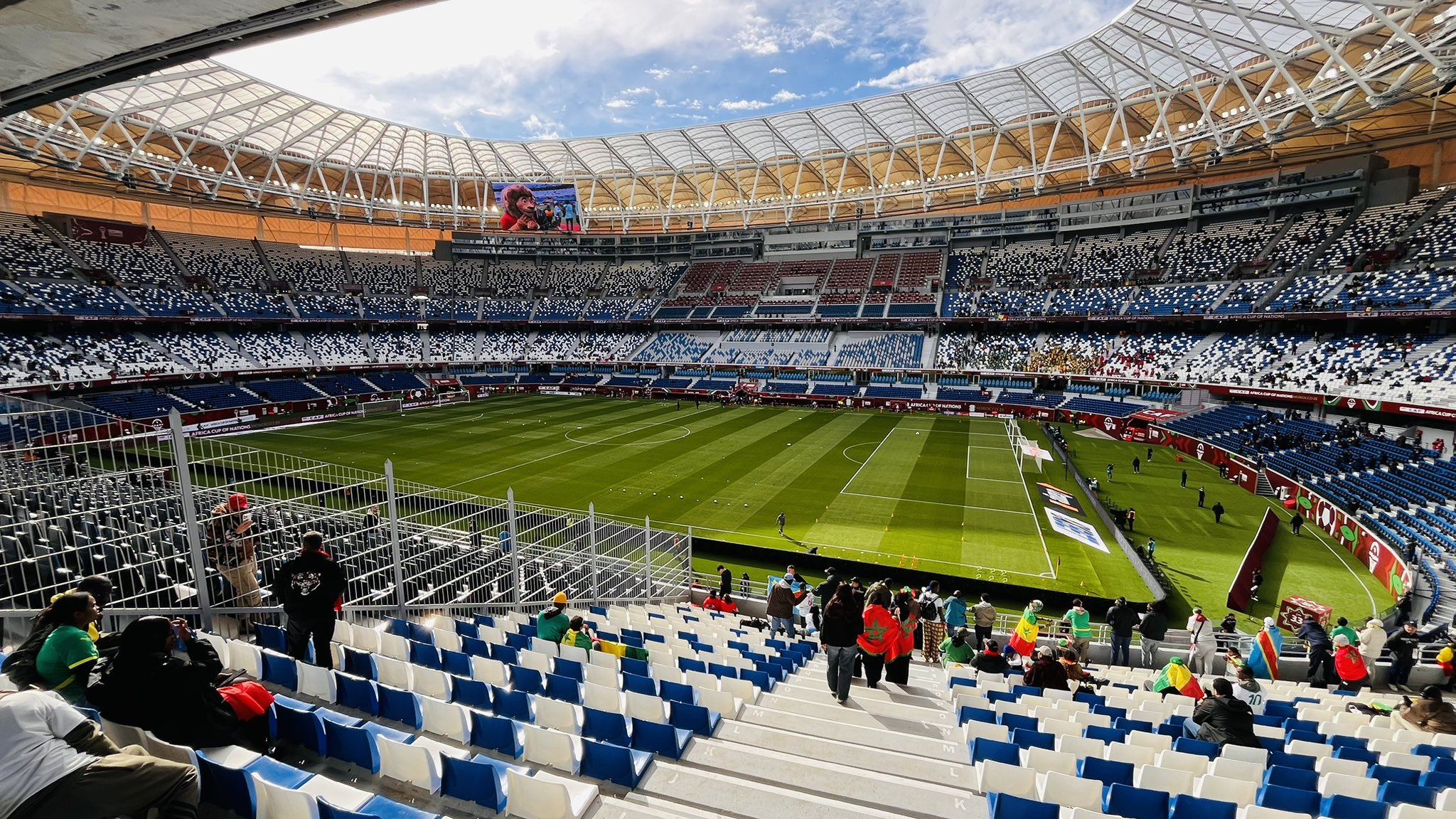
- Interactive map of Tangier Grand Stadium
- Full name: Grand Stade de Tanger
- Address: Avenue des Forces Armées Royales
- Location: Tangier, Morocco
- Operator: Sonarges
- Capacity: 75,500
- Surface: Hybrid grass
- Field size: 108 × 71 m

Construction
- Built: September 2002
- Opened: April 26, 2011
- Renovated: 2023–25
- Cost: $360 million (2025 renovation)
- Architect: Cabinet Anouar Amaoui

Tenants
- IR Tangier (2011–present); Morocco national football team (selected matches)

The Tangier Grand Stadium, commonly known as Ibn Battouta Stadium (Arabic: ملعب طنجة الكبير; Tamazight: ⴰⵏⵏⴰⵔ ⴰⵎⵇⵔⴰⵏ ⵏ ⵟⴰⵏⵊⴰ), is a stadium in Tangier, Morocco. It is used mostly for football matches and big events such as ceremonies or concerts. The stadium now has a legal capacity of 75,500 after renovation construction finished for hosting the 2025 Africa Cup of Nations. It serves as the new home of IR Tangier, replacing the former Marchan Stadium.

== History ==
The inaugural match was played on 26 April 2011 between IR Tanger and Atlético Madrid B which was followed by a match between Raja CA and Atlético Madrid. On July 27, the stadium hosted the 2011 Trophée des champions, in which Marseille beat Lille 5–4.

When Morocco hosted the 2011 African U-23 Championship the stadium hosted six matches in the Group stage and one in the Semi-finals.

The Stade Ibn Battuta was one of the confirmed host stadiums for the 2015 Africa Cup of Nations, which was to be hosted by Morocco until it was stripped of its hosting rights.

The stadium hosted the 2017 Trophée des Champions for the second time on July 29, in which Paris Saint-Germain beat Monaco 2–1.

When Morocco hosted the 2018 African Nations Championship the stadium hosted six matches in the Group stage and one in the Quarter-finals.

It hosted the 2018 Supercopa de España match between the Copa del Rey runners-up, Sevilla, and the winners of the 2017–18 Copa del Rey and 2017–18 La Liga, Barcelona, in which Barcelona beat Sevilla 2–1.

It was one of the venues in Morocco's failed bid for the 2026 FIFA World Cup. It was slated to host the Quarter-Finals if Morocco had been awarded the World Cup.

It experienced a renovation to increase its capacity and change the exterior to host the 2022 FIFA Club World Cup. It was planned that the capacity will increase from 44,500 seats to 65,000. On 25 January 2023, it was confirmed that the stadium is ready to host the 2022 FIFA Club World Cup.

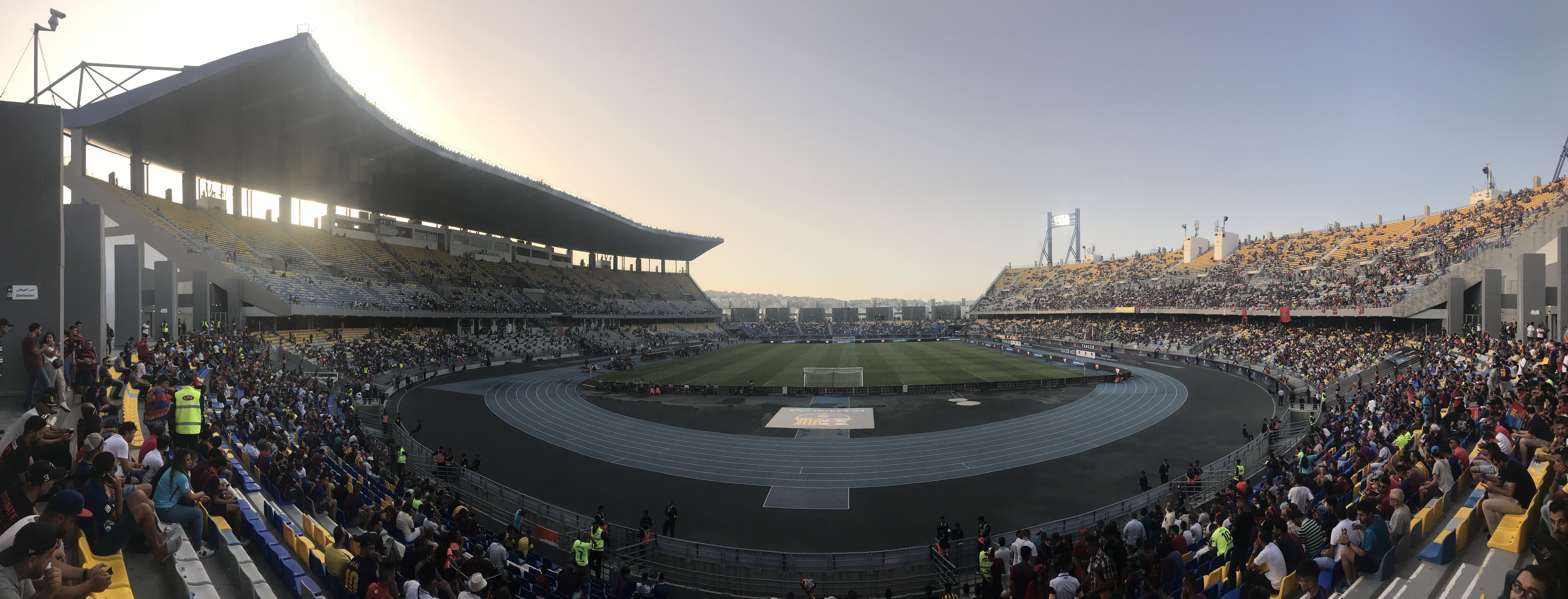
The stadium in 2018 before renovation

There are current studies to change the exterior of the stadium by making it fully covered, and removing the running tracks to increase its capacity to 87,000 before 2025 in conjunction with possibly hosting the 2025 Africa Cup of Nations and FIFA World Cup 2030, according to Abdelmalek Abron, a member of the FRMF and head of the Infrastructure Committee of the football system in Morocco. After the Africa Cup they will go from 75,000 to 92,000 removing the first tier and redo it; also the old screens will get removed to add more chairs.

== Football stadium specifications ==
Tangier Grand Stadium stands as one of Morocco's most prominent modern sporting venues, following an extensive redevelopment program that increased its capacity to approximately 75,500 seats and aligned it with the standards of football-specific stadiums required for FIFA 2030. The renovation works encompassed structural enhancements, expanded stands, and the installation of a roof covering the seating areas, along with upgraded lighting and broadcasting systems designed to support high-quality match transmission. The architectural redesign also focused on improving spectator access through organized circulation routes, ensuring smooth movement and enhanced safety during major events.

The stadium features comprehensive, high-end hospitality facilities, including dedicated seating for distinguished guests, VIP and VVIP lounges, and 142 skyboxes distributed across multiple levels. It also houses reception halls and furnished hospitality suites, in addition to a fully equipped media room and press booths capable of accommodating more than two hundred journalists in conditions suitable for live international broadcasting. Advanced technical systems were installed throughout the venue, including two giant screens of roughly 220 m^{2} each, a 700-meter perimeter LED display, a state-of-the-art sound system, and a centralized control room supported by nearly 900 surveillance cameras covering all areas of the stadium to ensure the highest security standards.

The pitch itself is fitted with a hybrid grass surface—combining natural grass with synthetic fibers—to guarantee durability and consistent performance. Team facilities include four modern dressing rooms, treatment and recovery rooms, indoor warm-up areas, and an extensive mixed zone for post-match media interactions. Externally, the stadium benefits from convenient transportation links due to its proximity to airports and major highways, and it is equipped with multiple parking zones of varying capacities: around 400 spaces for VVIPs, up to 700 for VIPs, and approximately 3,000 for the general public. Additional accessibility features, such as elevators and adapted pathways, ensure smooth access for persons with disabilities.

== International events ==
=== 2022 FIFA Club World Cup ===
Date	Local time	Team No. 1	Result	Team No. 2	Round	Attendance
1 February 2023	20:00	(Egypt) Al Ahly	3–0	(New Zealand) Auckland City	First round	47,317
4 February 2023	18:30	(United States) Seattle Sounders FC	0–1	(Egypt) Al Ahly	Second round	30,589
7 February 2023	20:30	(Brazil) Flamengo	2–3	(Saudi Arabia) Al-Hilal	Semi-finals	42,496
11 February 2023	16:30	(Egypt) Al Ahly	2–4	(Brazil) Flamengo	Third place match	30,216

=== 2025 Africa Cup of Nations ===
Date	Local time	Team No. 1	Result	Team No. 2	Round	Attendance
23 December 2025	16:00	Senegal	3–0	Botswana	Group stage	18,591
27 December 2025	16:00	Senegal	1–1	DR Congo	Group stage	41,672
30 December 2025	20:00	Benin	0–3	Senegal	Group stage	26,707
3 January 2026	17:00	Senegal	3–1	Sudan	Round of 16	30,045
9 January 2026	17:00	Mali	0–1	Senegal	Quarter-finals	32,385
14 January 2026	18:00	Senegal	1–0	Egypt	Semi-finals	52,079

=== International matches for Morocco national football team ===
14 August 2013 Friendly	Morocco	1–2	Burkina Faso	Tangier Grand Stadium, Tangier
20:00 UTC+1	Barrada 64'	Report	B.Traoré 8'; A.Traoré 50'	Referee: Malang Diedhiou (Senegal)

27 May 2016 Friendly	Morocco	2–0	Congo	Tangier Grand Stadium, Tangier
19:00 UTC+1	Ziyech 4', 55' (pen.)	Report		Referee: Issa Sy (Senegal)

26 March 2019 Friendly	Morocco	0–1	Argentina	Tangier Grand Stadium, Tangier
20:00 (UTC+1)		Report	Correa 83'	Attendance: 35.000; Referee: Janny Sikazwe (Zambia)

15 October 2019 Friendly	Morocco	2–3	Gabon	Tangier Grand Stadium, Tangier
19:00 (UTC+1)	Amrabat 32', 69' (pen.)	Report	Boupendza 22'; Bouanga 48'; Chebake 80' (o.g.)	Attendance: 28,000; Referee: Issa Sy (Senegal)

25 March 2023 Friendly	Morocco	2–1	Brazil	Tangier Grand Stadium, Tangier
22:00 UTC+0	Boufal 29'; Sabiri 78'	Report	Casemiro 67'	Attendance: 63.500; Referee: Sadok Selmi (Tunisia)

14 October 2025 Friendly	Morocco	1–0	Mozambique	Tangier Grand Stadium, Tangier
20:00 UTC+1	Ounahi 7'	Report		Attendance: 60,000; Referee: Moussa Diou (Mauritania)

18 October 2025 Friendly	Morocco	4–0	Uganda	Tangier Grand Stadium, Tangier
20:00 UTC+1	Achai 4' (o.g.); Saibari 33'; Rahimi 79' (pen.); El Khannouss 88'	Report		Referee: Ousmane Diakate (Mali)

4 October 2026 Friendly	Morocco	1–1	Mali	Tangier Grand Stadium, Tangier
18:00 UTC+0	Ezzalzouli 35' (pen.)	Report	G. Diarra 77'	Referee: Abdel Aziz Bouh (Mauritania)

== See also ==
- List of football stadiums in Morocco
- List of African stadiums by capacity
- List of association football stadiums by capacity
- Lists of stadiums
