= Salaheddine Chihab =

Moroccan footballer (born 1993)

Personal information
- Date of birth: 23 February 1993 (age 33)
- Place of birth: Mohammedia, Morocco
- Height: 1.98 m (6 ft 6 in)
- Position: Goalkeeper

Team information
- Current team: Maghreb of Fez
- Number: 16

Youth career
- –2011: SCC Mohammédia

Senior career*
Years	Team	Apps	(Gls)
2011–2012	SCC Mohammédia	2	(0)
2012–2018	Al-Shamal	136	(0)
2018–2019	OC Khouribga	2	(0)
2019	IR Tangier	1	(0)
2019–2020	Wydad de Fès	2	(0)
2020–2022	CAY Berrechid	9	(0)
2022–	Maghreb of Fez	32	(0)

International career
2024–	Morocco	1	(0)
2025–	Morocco A'	1	(0)
Medal record
Men's football
Representing Morocco
FIFA Arab Cup
Winner	2025 Qatar	Team
- * Club domestic league appearances and goals

Salaheddine Chihab (صلاح الدين شهاب; born 23 February 1993) is a Moroccan professional footballer who plays as a goalkeeper for Maghreb of Fez and the Morocco national team.

== Club career ==
Chihab trained and graduated from the SCC Mohammédia training center. He then signed a long-term contract with Al-Shamal in Qatar. With the club, he played the majority of his time in the second division, winning the championship in the 2013–2014 season and gaining promotion to the Stars League.

In 2018, Chihab returned to Botola Pro, in which he played for OC Khouribga, IR Tangier, Wydad de Fès and CAY Berrechid.

Arriving at Maghreb of Fez in 2022, Chihab reached the semi-finals of the Moroccan Throne Cup during the 2022–2023 season, after a defeat against AS FAR. He notably played an important role during MAS' run in the Throne Cup.

== International career ==
On 3 October 2024, Chihab received his first call-up from Walid Regragui, appearing on the list of Moroccan players selected for a match against the Central African Republic, counting towards the qualifiers for the 2025 AFCON. He was listed as third goalkeeper behind Yassine Bounou and Munir Mohamedi.

On 24 November 2025, Chihab was named to Morocco's final squad for the FIFA Arab Cup.

== Personal life ==
Chihab is the younger brother of former Moroccan international Tariq Chihab.

== Honours ==
Al-Shamal

- Qatari Second Division: 2013–14

Maghreb of Fez

- Botola Pro: 2025–26

Morocco A'

- FIFA Arab Cup: 2025
