= 2023–24 IR Tanger season =

Ittihad Tanger
2023–24 season
- President: Mohammed Cherkaoui
- Manager: Hilal Et-tair (until 15 September); Omar Najhi (from 15 September, until 11 January); Hilal Et-tair (from 12 January)
- Stadium: Saniat Rmel Stadium (12 matches); El Bachir Stadium (2 matches); Kenitra Municipal Stadium (1 match)
- Botola: 12th
- Moroccan Throne Cup: Round of 32
- Top goalscorer: League: Ismail Khafi (13); All: Ismail Khafi (13)
- Biggest win: IR Tanger 3–1 JS Soualem; Wydad AC 0–2 IR Tanger
- Biggest defeat: Raja CA 6–1 IR Tanger
Home colours	Away colours	Third colours
- All statistics correct as of 14 June 2024.

The 2023–24 season is Ittihad Riadi Tanger's 41st season in existence and the club's 25th in the top flight of Moroccan football, and ninth consecutive.

== Kit ==
- Supplier: Gloria
- Club Sponsor: Tanger-Med (front)
- League Sponsor: Inwi (sleeves)

Home	Away	Third	Fourth

== Season review ==
=== July ===
On 17 July, Ittihad Tanger announced the contract extension of Nouaman Aarab and Zouhair El Ouassli until 2025. In the same day, the club announced the signing of Nabil Jaadi from Mouloudia Oujda on a free transfer.

On 18 July, Ittihad Tanger announced the contract extension of Abdelmottalib Faouzi until 2025.

On 20 July, Ittihad Tanger announced the contract extension of Ahmed Chentouf until 2025, and announced the promotion of Abdelhamid Maâli.

On 31 July, Ittihad Tanger announced the signing of Reda Jaadi until 2025, and Walid Bencherifa also for two seasons, and Gaya Merbah until 2026.

On 31 July, Ittihad Tanger and Mohsine Moutouali agreed a two years contract extension lasting until 30 June 2025.

== August ==
On 5 August, Ittihad Tanger announced the signing of Ismail Khafi until 2025, and Youssef Laghzal until 2026.

On 11 August, Ittihad Tanger announced the contract extension of Oussama Al Aiz until 2026. In the same day, the club announced the signing of Alexis Sánchez until 2026.

On 23 August, Ittihad Tanger announced the signing of Hamza El Wasti until 2025.

On 30 August, Ittihad Tanger announced the signing of Mohamed Saoud until 2026.

On 31 August, Ittihad Tangier reached an agreement with players Badreddine Bakkali and Mohamed Yassine Dihaz to terminate their contract with the team by mutual consent.

== September ==
On 6 September, Ittihad Tangier announces the amicable termination of the player Mohsine Moutouali’s contract.

On 7 September, Ittihad Tanger announced the signing of El Hadji Madické Kane until 2025. Later on the same day, it was announced that the player Ismail Laghzali’s contract was amicably terminated. The club also announced the signing of Youssef Chaina until 2025.

On 8 September, Ittihad Tanger announced the signing of Jalal Daoudi and Anass Lamrabat until 2025.

On 15 September, Ittihad Tanger announced the termination of its contract with coach Hilal Et-tair, and the appointment of Omar Najhi as the new first team head coach.

== September ==
On 11 January, Ittihad Tanger announces that it has dispensed with the services of coach Omar Najhi.

On 12 January, Ittihad Tanger re-signs with coach Hilal Al-Tair.

== Squad ==
As of match played 14 June 2024

No.	Name	Nationality	Position	Date of birth (age)	Signed from	Signed in	Contract ends	Apps.	Goals
Goalkeepers
1	Gaya Merbah	(Algeria)	GK	22 July 1994 (age 32)	Raja CA	2023	2026	41	(-46)
12	Imad Askar	(Morocco)	GK	29 May 1998 (age 28)	MA Tétouan	2018	2024	6	(-13)
37	Youssef Laghzal	(Morocco)	GK	1 January 2001 (age 25)	WA Fès	2023	2026	0	(0)
72	Badreddine Benachour	(Morocco)	GK	9 August 1994 (age 32)	Al-Kawkab FC	2022	2024	13	(-13)
Defenders
2	Youssef Chaina	(Morocco)	DF	12 October 1992 (age 34)	OC Khouribga	2023	2025	13	1
4	Mohamed Saoud	(Morocco)	DF	30 January 1996 (age 30)	MA Tetouan	2023	2026	23	3
13	Oussama Al Aiz	(Morocco)	DF	26 January 1999 (age 27)	Academy	2020	2026	34	0
15	Ayoub Jarfi (3rd captain)	(Morocco)	DF	8 March 1996 (age 30)	Academy	2016	2024	133	2
22	Zakaria Kiani	(Morocco)	RB	22 January 1997 (age 29)	CAY Berrechid	2022	2024	51	2
23	Anass Lamrabat	(Morocco)	DF	13 July 1993 (age 33)	MA Tétouan	2023	2025	21	0
29	El Hadji Youssoupha Konaté (4th captain)	(Senegal)	DF	6 May 1994 (age 32)	Free agent	2023 (2)	2024	126	7
31	Walid Bencherifa	(Algeria)	DF	6 November 1988 (age 38)	OC Khouribga	2023	2025	21	0
Midfielders
6	Nouaman Aarab (vice captain)	(Morocco)	MF	27 August 1990 (age 36)	CA Khénifra	2017	2025	166	5
8	Abdelmottalib Faouzi	(Morocco)	MF	19 July 1993 (age 33)	CR Bernoussi	2019	2025	82	5
10	Reda Jaadi (captain)	(Morocco) (Belgium)	MF	14 February 1995 (age 31)	Wydad AC	2023	2025	12	0
14	Mohamed Said Bouksyr	(Morocco)	MF	28 March 1997 (age 29)	O Dcheira	2022	2024	48	0
16	Ahmed Chentouf	(Morocco)	MF	5 December 1996 (age 29)	HUS Agadir (A)	2023 (2)	2025	131	6
17	Abdelhamid Maâli	(Morocco)	MF	16 March 2006 (age 20)	Academy	2023	2026	14	0
21	Mahmoud El Kayssoumi	(Morocco)	MF	22 February 2002 (age 24)	CS Ajax Tanger	2022	2025	9	0
70	Hamza Hassani Boouia	(Morocco)	MF	24 March 1995 (age 31)	CR Al Hoceima	2021	2024	29	0
80	El Hadji Madické Kane	(Senegal)	MF	19 December 1996 (age 29)	SC Pombal	2023	2025	28	6
Forwards
7	Nabil Jaadi	(Morocco) (Belgium)	FW	1 July 1996 (age 30)	MC Oujda	2023	2025	7	0
9	Ismail Khafi	(Morocco)	FW	19 September 1995 (age 31)	Al-Sailiya SC	2023	2025	29	13
11	Abdellatif Akhrif	(Morocco)	FW	1 February 2000 (age 26)	Academy	2020	2026	74	4
18	Hamza El Wasti	(Morocco)	FW	28 October 1995 (age 31)	SCC Mohammédia	2023	2025	26	1
19	Jawad Ghabra	(Morocco)	FW	9 November 1994 (age 32)	RCA Zemamra	2022	2024	25	3
20	Hassan Zraibi	(Morocco)	FW	1 October 1997 (age 29)	Kénitra AC	2022	2024	33	3
28	Alexis Sánchez	(Spain)	FW	12 December 1995 (age 30)	Free agent	2023	2026	9	0
30	Ali El Harrak	(Morocco) (Spain)	FW	31 July 1997 (age 29)	Free agent	2023		20	0
93	Zouhair El Ouassli	(Morocco)	FW	11 August 1993 (age 33)	Al-Olympique SC	2023	2025	39	1
Players who have left the club during the season
5	Mohsine Moutouali (captain)	(Morocco)	MF	3 March 1986 (age 40)	Al Ahli SC	2023	2025	19	3
2	Ismail Laghzali	(Morocco)	DF	12 February 2003 (age 23)	Mohammed VI FA	2022	2025	9	0
4	Ismail El Alami	(Morocco)	DF	1 January 2000 (age 26)	CC Fath A Casablanca	2022	2025	4	0
5	Jalal Daoudi	(Morocco)	MF	17 August 1988 (age 38)	Wydad AC	2023	2025	3	0

- (A) = originally from the academy

=== From youth squad ===
No.	Name	Nationality	Position	Date of birth (age)	Signed from	Signed in	Contract ends	Apps.	Goals
25	Mohammed El Mehedi	(Morocco)	MF			2023		1	0
26	Salaheddine Cheffani	(Morocco)	MF	27 June 2004 (age 22)	Mohammed VI FA	2022	2025	2	0
34	Yassine El Guartit	(Morocco)	MF			2023		1	0

== Transfers ==
=== In ===
No.	Pos	Player	Transferred from	Fee	Date	Source
7	FW	(Morocco) Nabil Jaadi	Free agent	Free Transfer	17 July 2023	
10	MF	(Morocco) Reda Jaadi	Wydad AC	Free Transfer	31 July 2023	
31	DF	(Algeria) Walid Bencherifa	OC Khouribga	Free Transfer	31 July 2023	
1	GK	(Algeria) Gaya Merbah	Raja CA		31 July 2023	
9	FW	(Morocco) Ismail Khafi	(Qatar) Al-Sailiya SC	Free Transfer	5 August 2023	
37	GK	(Morocco) Youssef Laghzal	WA Fès	Free Transfer	5 August 2023	
28	FW	(Spain) Alexis Sánchez	Free agent	Free Transfer	11 August 2023	
18	FW	(Morocco) Hamza El Wasti	SCC Mohammedia	Free Transfer	23 August 2023	
4	DF	(Morocco) Mohamed Saoud	MA Tétouan	Free Transfer	30 August 2023	
80	MF	(Senegal) El Hadji Madické Kane	(Portugal) SC Pombal	Free Transfer	7 September 2023	
2	DF	(Morocco) Youssef Chaina	OC Khouribga	Free Transfer	7 September 2023	
5	MF	(Morocco) Jalal Daoudi	Wydad AC	Free Transfer	8 September 2023	

=== Promoted ===
No.	Pos	Player	Contract Until	Date	Source
17	MF	(Morocco) Abdelhamid Maâli	2026	20 July 2023	

=== Contract renewals ===
No.	Pos.	Player	Contract length	Contract ends	Date	Ref.
6	MF	(Morocco) Nouaman Aarab	2-years	2025	17 July 2023	
93	FW	(Morocco) Zouhair El Ouassli	2-years	2025	17 July 2023	
8	MF	(Morocco) Abdelmottalib Faouzi	2-years	2025	18 July 2023	
16	MF	(Morocco) Ahmed Chentouf	2-years	2025	20 July 2023	
5	MF	(Morocco) Mohsine Moutouali	2-years	2025	4 August 2023	
13	DF	(Morocco) Oussama Al Aiz	3-years	2026	11 August 2023	

=== Out ===
No.	Pos	Player	Transferred to	Fee	Date	Source
42	MF	(Morocco) Sofian El Moudane	(Saudi Arabia) Al Jandal SC	Free Transfer	30 June 2023	
1	GK	(Algeria) Gaya Merbah	Raja CA	Loan return	30 June 2023	
20	DF	(Morocco) Mouhcine Rabja	DH Jadidi	Loan return	30 June 2023	
21	DF	(Morocco) Mohamed Souboul	Raja CA	Loan return	30 June 2023	
34	FW	(Morocco) Sabir Achefay	(Netherlands) SDC Putten	Free Transfer	30 June 2023	
55	FW	(Morocco) Zakaria Benlamachi	OC Safi	Free Transfer	30 June 2023	
31	MF	(Morocco) Youssef Benali	(Belgium) UR La Louvière Centre	Free Transfer	30 June 2023	
9	FW	(Morocco) Mouad Ajandouz		Free Transfer	30 June 2023	
10	MF	(Algeria) Abdellah El Moudene		Free Transfer	30 June 2023	
28	DF	(Morocco) Abdelatif Noussir	Racing AC	Free Transfer	30 June 2023	
99	GK	(Morocco) Zouhair Laaroubi	Retired		30 June 2023	
—	DF	(Morocco) Bilal Akhedim		Contract termination	5 August 2023	
45	FW	(Gabon) Abdou Atchabao		Contract termination	14 August 2023	
3	DF	(Morocco) Hatim El Ouahabi		Contract termination	28 August 2023	
24	DF	(Morocco) Saber Yazidi		Contract termination	28 August 2023	
61	MF	(Morocco) Badreddine Bakkali	CHA Tangert	Contract termination	31 August 2023	
66	MF	(Morocco) Mohamed Yassine Dihaz	CHA Tangert	Contract termination	31 August 2023	
5	MF	(Morocco) Mohsine Moutouali	HUS Agadir	Contract termination	6 September 2023	
2	DF	(Morocco) Ismail Laghzali		Contract termination	7 September 2023	
17	FW	(Ivory Coast) Djama Joé Amian	HUS Agadir	Contract termination	8 September 2023	
27	DF	(Morocco) Ayoub El Rahmmaouy		Contract termination	14 September 2023	
4	DF	(Morocco) Ismail El Alami		Contract termination	15 September 2023	
33	FW	(Morocco) Bilal El Hankouri				
5	MF	(Morocco) Jalal Daoudi		Contract termination	2 January 2024	
—	FW	(Morocco) Abdelali Asri		Contract termination	30 January 2024	

== Technical staff ==
Position	Name
First team head coach	(Morocco) Hilal Et-tair
Assistant coach	(Morocco) Abdelouahed Benkacem
Fitness coach	(Morocco) Rachid Blej
Goalkeeping coach	(Morocco) Mohammed Bestara
Performance analyst	(Morocco) Ahmed Zekhnini

until 15 September 2023.

Position	Name
First team head coach	(Morocco) Omar Najhi

until 11 January 2024.

Position	Name
First team head coach	(Morocco) Hilal Et-tair

== Pre-season and friendlies ==
9 August 2023 1	IR Tanger (Morocco)	2–1	(Morocco) KAC Marrakech	Tangier, Morocco
18:00 UTC+1	Bensaid; Moutouali	Report	Imaich (pen.)	Stadium: Stade Village Ziaten

16 August 2023 2	IR Tanger (Morocco)	4–1	(Morocco) CS Ajax Tanger	Tangier, Morocco
18:30 UTC+1	Sánchez; Chentouf; Aarab; Khafi; Ghabra (penalty missed)	Report; Report	Goal	Stadium: Stade Village Ziaten

17 August 2023 3	IR Tanger (Morocco)	0–0	(Morocco) MA Tetouan	Tangier, Morocco
18:00 UTC+1	Moutouali (penalty missed)	Report		Stadium: Stade Village Ziaten

19 August 2023 4	US Touarga (Morocco)	2–0	(Morocco) IR Tanger	Rabat, Morocco
18:00 UTC+1		Report		Stadium: Touarga Stadium

22 August 2023 5	WA Fes (Morocco)	1–3	(Morocco) IR Tanger
18:00 UTC+1	Goal	Report	Zraibi; Aarab; Cheffani

20 September 2023 6	IR Tanger (Morocco)	5–1	(Morocco) AMAT
17:30 UTC+1		Report

13 October 2023 7	JS Soualem (Morocco)	1–2	(Morocco) IR Tanger	El Jadida, Morocco
18:00 UTC+1	Goal	Report	Madické; Chentouf

15 October 2023	US Touarga (Morocco)	Cancelled	(Morocco) IR Tanger	El Jadida, Morocco
--:-- UTC+1

18 October 2023 8	IR Tanger (Morocco)	3–2	(Morocco) SCC Mohammédia	Tangier, Morocco
--:-- UTC+1	Konaté; Khafi; El Wasti	Report	Goal	Stadium: Stade Village Ziaten

21 October 2023 9	Raja CA (Morocco)	3–2	(Morocco) IR Tanger	Casablanca, Morocco
17:00 UTC+1	Zerhouni; Al Makahasi; Ennafati	Report	R. Jaadi 3' (pen.)	Stadium: Larbi Zaouli Stadium
Note: The match was played in three rounds to give all players the opportunity to participate.

20 January 2024 10	KAC Marrakech (Morocco)	1–1	(Morocco) IR Tanger	Marrakesh, Morocco
14:00 UTC+1	Kombous	Report	Khafi	Stadium: Marrakech Annex Stadium

24 January 2024 11	US Touarga (Morocco)	2–0	(Morocco) IR Tanger	Salé, Morocco
--:-- UTC+1				Stadium: Mohammed VI Football Academy

25 January 2024 12	Fath US (Morocco)	1–1	(Morocco) IR Tanger	Rabat, Morocco
15:30 UTC+1	Soukhane 8'	Report; Report	Hassani	Stadium: FUS Academy

23 March 2024 13	IR Tanger (Morocco)	2–0	Sudan	Tangier, Morocco
22:00 UTC	Bouksyr; Zraibi	Report		Stadium: Stade Village Ziaten

5 April 2024 14	IR Tanger (Morocco)	2–2	(Morocco) CHA Tanger	Tangier, Morocco
22:00 UTC	El Harrak; Zraibi	Report	Sbai; Rahmouni	Stadium: Stade Village Ziaten

7 April 2024 15	IR Tanger (Morocco)	2–1	(Morocco) CS Ajax Tanger	Tangier, Morocco
22:00 UTC	Konaté; El Wasti	Report	Goal	Stadium: Stade Village Ziaten

== Competitions ==
Win Draw Loss

=== Overview ===
Competition	First match	Last match	Starting round	Final position	Record							
Competition	First match	Last match	Starting round	Final position	Pld	W	D	L	GF	GA	GD	Win %
Botola	27 August 2023	14 June 2024	Matchday 1	12th	30	7	12	11	29	38	−9	23.33
Throne Cup	28 March 2024	28 March 2024	Round of 32	Round of 32	1	0	1	0	2	2	+0	0.00
Total					31	7	13	11	31	40	−9	22.58

Last updated: 14 June 2024.
Source: Competitions

=== Botola ===
==== Standings ====
Pos	Team	Pld	W	D	L	GF	GA	GD	Pts
10	Hassania Agadir	30	8	11	11	35	43	−8	35 (Note: Moghreb Tétouan finished ahead of Hassania Agadir on head-to-head points: Hassania Agadir 0–2 Moghreb Tétouan, Moghreb Tétouan 1–1 Hassania Agadir)
11	MAS Fès	30	8	10	12	34	35	−1	34
12	IR Tanger	30	7	12	11	29	38	−9	33
13	JS Soualem	30	8	6	16	31	46	−15	30
14	SCC Mohammédia	30	6	7	17	19	40	−21	25 (Note: SCC Mohammédia finished ahead of Mouloudia Oujda on head-to-head points: SCC Mohammédia 1–0 Mouloudia Oujda, Mouloudia Oujda 0–0 SCC Mohammédia)

Source: FRMF.ma
Rules for classification: 1) Points; 2a) Head-to-head goal difference if they are two teams with equal points; 2b) Goal difference if they are more than two teams with equal points; 3) Number of wins; 4) Goals scored; 5) Play-off between involved teams.

==== Results summary ====
Overall								Home						Away					
Pld	W	D	L	GF	GA	GD	Pts	W	D	L	GF	GA	GD	W	D	L	GF	GA	GD
30	7	12	11	29	38	−9	33	3	6	5	13	18	−5	4	6	6	16	20	−4

Last updated: 14 June 2024.
Source: goalzz.com

==== Results by round ====
Round	1	2	3	4	5	6	7	8	9	10	11	12	13	14	15	16	17	18	19	20	21	22	23	24	25	26	27	28	29	30
Ground	H	A	H	H	A	H	A	H	A	H	A	H	A	H	A	A	H	A	A	H	A	H	A	H	A	H	A	H	A	H
Result	L	L	D	W	D	L	L	D	D	D	D	D	L	D	L	W	L	D	W	W	L	L	W	L	D	W	D	L	W	D
Position	16	15	13	11	11	13	13	13	13	12	13	14	14	15	15	15	15	15	15	12	13	14	11	12	12	11	12	12	12	12

Updated to match(es) played on 14 June 2024. Source: Botola
A = Away; H = Home; W = Win; D = Draw; L = Loss

==== Matches ====
27 August 2023 1	IR Tanger	0–2	JS Soualem	Tétouan
17:00 UTC+1		Report	Sakhi 5'; El Allouch (yellow card) 24'; Hmaidou 25'; Bahsain (yellow card) 42'	Stadium: Saniat Rmel Stadium; Attendance: 0 Referee: Youssef Triki
Note: Due to Ibn Battuta Stadium renovation, the team hosted its match at Saniat Rmel Stadium.

3 September 2023 2	RS Berkane	2–1	IR Tanger	Berkane
19:15 UTC+1	Tahif 40'; Zghoudi (yellow card) 58'; Camara (yellow card) 69'; Lamlioui 90+6' (yellow card) 90+9'	Report	Zraibi 4'; El Ouassli (yellow card) 21'; Askar (yellow card) 33'	Stadium: Stade Municipal de Berkane; Referee: Karim Sabry

17 September 2023 3	IR Tanger	1–1	MC Oujda	Tétouan
21:30 UTC+1	Konaté (yellow card) 56'; Bencherifa (yellow card) 70'; Ghabra (yellow card) 72' (goal) 77'	Report	Gourad (yellow card) 36'; Gaddarine 87' (pen.)	Stadium: Saniat Rmel Stadium; Attendance: 0 Referee: Moncef Zine Alaoui
Note: Due to Ibn Battuta Stadium renovation, the team hosted its match at Saniat Rmel Stadium.

23 September 2023 4	IR Tanger	2–1	CAY Berrechid	Tétouan
19:15 UTC+1	Madické (yellow card) 8' (goal) 62'; Konaté (yellow card) 26'; Khafi 68' (pen.)	Report	Bouabid (yellow card) 22'; El Hamzaoui 40'	Stadium: Saniat Rmel Stadium; Attendance: 0 Referee: Nabil Benrqia
Note: Due to Ibn Battuta Stadium renovation, the team hosted its match at Saniat Rmel Stadium.

1 October 2023 5	US Touarga	2–2	IR Tanger	Rabat
20:30 UTC+1	Saidi (yellow card) 31'; Diedhiou (yellow card) 36'; Aouk 51'; Gadio (yellow card) 62'; Bentayeb 90+4' (yellow card) 90+8'	Report	Saoud 33'; Khafi 45+2'; Chentouf (yellow card) 89'; R. Jaadi (yellow card) 90+2'	Stadium: Stade Moulay Hassan; Referee: Hicham Tamsamani

7 October 2023 6	IR Tanger	0–3	Wydad AC	Tétouan
20:30 UTC+1	Konaté (yellow card) 23'; R. Jaadi (yellow card) 33'; Saoud (yellow card) 52'; Daoudi (yellow card) 71'	Report	El Bahri 19', 65', 76'; Draoui (yellow card) 45'; Serrhat (yellow card) 65'; Attiyat Allah (yellow card) 73'; Aboulfath (yellow card) 87'	Stadium: Saniat Rmel Stadium; Attendance: 0 Referee: Hamza El Fareq
Note: Due to Ibn Battuta Stadium renovation, the team hosted its match at Saniat Rmel Stadium.

29 October 2023 7	AS FAR	1–0	IR Tanger	Kenitra
16:00 UTC+1	Naji (yellow card) 56'; Essaouabi 84'	Report	Daoudi (yellow card) 73'; R. Jaadi (yellow card) 90+5'	Stadium: Kenitra Municipal Stadium; Referee: Karim Sabry

5 November 2023 8	IR Tanger	2–2	Maghreb AS	Tétouan
16:00 UTC+1	Daoudi (penalty missed) 13'; Chaina (yellow card) 30'; Khafi 38' (yellow card) 81'; Madické 78'	Report	Aït Khorsa (yellow card) 12'; Riahi (yellow card) 20'; Bouriga 36', 50'; Nassik (yellow card) 83'; Jerrari (yellow card) 86'	Stadium: Saniat Rmel Stadium; Attendance: 0 Referee: Moncef Zine Alaoui
Note: Due to Ibn Battuta Stadium renovation, the team hosted its match at Saniat Rmel Stadium.

12 November 2023 9	HUS Agadir	1–1	IR Tanger	Agadir
20:30 UTC+1	Esdiri (yellow card) 7'; Kati 33'; Asstati (yellow card) 43'; Khallati (yellow card) 44'; Mbele (yellow card) 82'	Report	Madické (yellow card) 11'; R. Jaadi (yellow card) 42'; Khafi 86' (pen.)	Stadium: Stade Adrar; Referee: Jamal Belbasri

26 November 2023 10	IR Tanger	1–1	MA Tétouan	Mohammédia
16:00 UTC+1	Saoud (yellow card) 20' (penalty missed) 90+5'; El Wasti 45+2'; Chentouf (yellow card) 81'	Report	Badji 20' (pen.) (yellow card) 90+1'; Goulouss (yellow card) 43'; Krouch (yellow card) 81' (yellow-red card) 90+5'	Stadium: Stade El Bachir; Attendance: 0 Referee: Jalal Jayed
Note: Due to Ibn Battuta Stadium renovation, the team hosted its match at El Bachir Stadium.

8 December 2023 11	Fath US	0–0	IR Tanger	Rabat
18:00 UTC+1	El Bassil (yellow card) 90+5'	Report	Madické (yellow card) 46'; Maâli (yellow card) 67'	Stadium: Stade Moulay Hassan; Referee: Youssef Triki

16 December 2023 12	IR Tanger	0–0	OC Safi	Mohammédia
18:00 UTC+1	Saoud (yellow card) 57'; Ghabra (yellow card) 73'	Report	Moujahid (yellow card) 63'; Rhailouf (yellow card) 73'; Lamirat (yellow card) 74'	Stadium: Stade El Bachir; Referee: Mohamed Ballote
Note: Due to Ibn Battuta Stadium renovation, the team hosted its match at El Bachir Stadium.

28 December 2023 13	Raja CA	6–1	IR Tanger	Berrechid
16:00 UTC+1	Zerhouni 3', 62', 73'; Bouzok 16', 28' (pen.), 69'; El Wardi (yellow card) 90+2'	Report	R. Jaadi (yellow card) 56'; Khafi 88'	Stadium: Berrechid Municipal Stadium; Referee: Abderrahim Arrakhiz

3 January 2024 14	IR Tanger	1–1	RCA Zemamra	Tétouan
20:00 UTC+1	Ghabra 56'; R. Jaadi (yellow card) 71'; Saoud (yellow card) 76'	Report	Forsy 7'; Rahim (yellow card) 14' (yellow-red card) 45+3'; Soufi (yellow card) 21'; El Kadmiri (yellow card) 90+4'	Stadium: Saniat Rmel Stadium; Attendance: 0 Referee: Redouane Jiyed
Note: Due to Ibn Battuta Stadium renovation, the team hosted its match at Saniat Rmel Stadium.

6 January 2024 15	SCC Mohammédia	1–0	IR Tanger	Mohammédia
20:00 UTC+1	Afalah 20'; Bahaj (yellow card) 58'	Report	El Ouassli (yellow card) 16'; Chaina (yellow card) 33'; Khafi (yellow card) 45+3'	Stadium: Stade El Bachir; Referee: Mohamed Nhayeh

7 February 2024 16	JS Soualem	1–3	IR Tanger	Mohammédia
16:00 UTC+1	Rahimi 39' (yellow card) 41'; Hasty (yellow card) 40'; El Bellali (yellow card) 67'	Report	Chentouf 5' (yellow card) 38'; Khafi 58'; Ghabra (yellow card) 62'; Lamrabat (yellow card) 88'; Akhrif 90+5' (yellow card) 90+5'	Stadium: Stade El Bachir; Referee: Mohamed Hwider

11 February 2024 17	IR Tanger	0–1	RS Berkane	Tétouan
16:00 UTC+1	Lamrabat (yellow card) 37'; Konaté (yellow card) 76'; Bencherifa (yellow card) 89'	Report	Mehri 48'; Gnolou (yellow card) 82'; Zghoudi (yellow card) 90+3'	Stadium: Saniat Rmel Stadium; Attendance: 0 Referee: Samir Guezzaz
Note: Due to Ibn Battuta Stadium renovation, the team hosted its match at Saniat Rmel Stadium.

15 February 2024 18	MC Oujda	1–1	IR Tanger	Oujda
18:00 UTC+1	Anouar 29'; Lougmani (red card) 89'	Report	Ghabra 35' (yellow card) 45+1'; Kiani (yellow card) 55'; Bencherifa (yellow card) 73'; Saoud (yellow card) 90+5'	Stadium: Honneur Stadium; Referee: Nabil Benrqia

18 February 2024 19	CAY Berrechid	0–1	IR Tanger	Berrechid
16:00 UTC+1		Report	Madické 43' (yellow card) 79'; Saoud (yellow card) 90+1'	Stadium: Berrechid Municipal Stadium; Referee: Mustapha Kechaf

22 February 2024 20	IR Tanger	2–1	US Touarga	Tétouan
18:00 UTC+1	Saoud 59'; Khafi 90+1'	Report	Haddad 3' (red card) 57'; Gadio (yellow card) 45+2'	Stadium: Saniat Rmel Stadium; Attendance: 0 Referee: Mohamed Nhayeh
Note: Due to Ibn Battuta Stadium renovation, the team hosted its match at Saniat Rmel Stadium.

2 March 2024 22	IR Tanger	1–2	AS FAR	Kenitra
18:00 UTC+1	Konaté (yellow card) 42' (yellow-red card) 90+6'; Khafi (yellow card) 45+3'; Chaina 81'; Madické (yellow card) 84'; Bencherifa (yellow card) 90+7'; El Ouassli (yellow card) 90+7'; Et-tair (coach) (red card) 90+15'	Report	Diakite (yellow card) 34'; Orebonye 53'; Hrimat 90+9' (pen.)	Stadium: Kenitra Municipal Stadium; Referee: Mohamed Lahouidri
Note: Due to Ibn Battuta Stadium renovation, the team hosted its match at Kenitra Municipal Stadium.

9 March 2024 23	Maghreb AS	2–1	IR Tanger	Fez
20:00 UTC+1	El Ghazouani (yellow card) 27'; Jerrari 37'; El Janati 43'; El Badoui (yellow card) 70'; Bouriga (yellow card) 73'; El Jabali (yellow card) 90+2'	Report	Khafi (penalty missed) 5' 5' (penalty missed) 52'; Akhrif (yellow card) 42'	Stadium: Stade Hassan-II; Referee: Mustapha Kechaf

12 March 2024 21	Wydad AC	0–2	IR Tanger	Casablanca
22:00 UTC	Chetti (yellow card) 74'; Draoui (yellow card) 88'	Report	Madické 11'; Khafi 13'; Bencherifa (yellow card) 80'; Kiani (yellow card) 88'; Merbah (yellow card) 90+2'	Stadium: Larbi Zaouli Stadium; Referee: Samir Guezzaz
Note: The match, originally scheduled for 25 February 2024, was pushed back because of the involvement of Wydad AC at the 2023–24 CAF Champions League.

17 March 2024 24	IR Tanger	0–1	HUS Agadir	Tétouan
22:00 UTC	Saoud (yellow card) 64'; Chaina (yellow card) 90+3'	Report	Rami (yellow card) 45'; Beye (yellow card) 54' (goal) 90+4'	Stadium: Saniat Rmel Stadium; Attendance: 0 Referee: Moncef Zine Alaoui
Note: Due to Ibn Battuta Stadium renovation, the team hosted its match at Saniat Rmel Stadium.

14 April 2024 25	MA Tétouan	1–1	IR Tanger	Tétouan
19:00 UTC+1	El Megri (yellow card) 44'; Badji (yellow card) 72' (goal) 74' (pen.)	Report	Faouzi (yellow card) 72'; Saoud 83'; Bencherifa (yellow card) 86'	Stadium: Stade Saniat Rmel; Referee: Tariq Moutamani

20 April 2024 26	IR Tanger	2–1	Fath US	Tétouan
17:00 UTC+1	Madické 27'; Jarfi (yellow card) 41'; Chaina (yellow card) 41'; Khafi 77' (pen.); Kiani (yellow card) 82'	Report	Hannouri 36'; Sabaouni (bench) (red card) 46'; Qasmi (yellow card) 56'; Ben Khaleq (yellow card) 77'; Badaoui (yellow card) 90+3'	Stadium: Stade Saniat Rmel; Referee: Mustapha Kechaf

27 April 2024 27	OC Safi	1–1	IR Tanger	Safi
21:00 UTC+1	Kordani (yellow card) 33'; Haba (red card) 45+6'; Moujahid (yellow card) 57'; Rhailouf (yellow card) 85'; Belmaachi (yellow card) 90'; Qassaq 90+2'	Report	Kiani (yellow card) 63'; Ghabra (yellow card) 69'; Zraibi (yellow card) 89'; Khafi 90+5'	Stadium: Stade El Massira; Referee: Abderrahim Errakhiz

28 May 2024 28	IR Tanger	1–2	Raja CA	Tétouan
19:00 UTC+1	Bencherifa (yellow card) 25'; Khafi 57'; Ghabra (yellow card) 75'	Report	Mokadem (yellow card) 51'; Bouzok 74' (pen.); Ennafati (yellow card) 75'; Benayad 85' (yellow card) 90+7'; Belammari (yellow card) 90+6'	Stadium: Saniat Rmel Stadium; Attendance: 0 Referee: Bouchra Karboubi
Note: Due to Ibn Battuta Stadium renovation, the team hosted its match at Saniat Rmel Stadium.

1 June 2024 29	RCA Zemamra	0–1	IR Tanger	Zemamra
19:00 UTC+1		Report	Khafi (penalty missed) 32' 44'; Benachour (yellow card) 88'; El Harrak (yellow card) 90'	Stadium: Ahmed Choukri Stadium; Referee: Yassine Bouslim

14 June 2024 30	IR Tanger	0–0	SCC Mohammédia	Tétouan
18:00 UTC+1	Kiani (yellow card) 45'	Report	Gari (yellow card) 18'	Stadium: Saniat Rmel Stadium; Attendance: 0
Note: Due to Ibn Battuta Stadium renovation, the team hosted its match at Saniat Rmel Stadium.

==== Results overview ====
Locations of the 2022–23 Botola teams

Win Draw Loss

Region	Team	Home score	Away score	Aggregate score
Casablanca-Settat	CAY Berrechid	2–1	0–1	3–1
Casablanca-Settat	JS Soualem	0–2	1–3	3–3
Casablanca-Settat	Raja CA	1–2	6–1	2–8
Casablanca-Settat	RCA Zemamra	1–1	0–1	2–1
Casablanca-Settat	SCC Mohammédia	0–0	1–0	0–1
Casablanca-Settat	Wydad AC	0–3	0–2	2–3
Rabat-Salé-Kénitra	AS FAR	1–2	1–0	1–3
Rabat-Salé-Kénitra	Fath US	2–1	0–0	2–1
Rabat-Salé-Kénitra	US Touarga	2–1	2–2	4–3
Oriental	MC Oujda	1–1	1–1	2–2
Oriental	RS Berkane	0–1	2–1	1–3
Tanger-Tetouan-Al Hoceima	MA Tétouan	1–1	1–1	2–2
Fès-Meknès	Maghreb AS	2–2	2–1	3–4
Marrakech-Safi	OC Safi	0–0	1–1	1–1
Souss-Massa	HUS Agadir	0–1	1–1	1–2

=== Throne Cup ===
28 March 2024 Round of 32	Maghreb AS	2–2 (a.e.t.) (3–0 p)	IR Tanger	Fez
22:00 UTC	El Janati (yellow card) 44'; Aina 52'; Bouriga (yellow card) 63' (goal) 79'; Chihab (bench) (yellow card) 80'	Report	Saoud (yellow card) 13'; Konaté (yellow card) 35'; Kiani 40'; Faouzi (yellow card) 45+3'; Bencherifa (penalty missed) 64' (yellow card) 90+2'; Madické 90'	Stadium: Stade Hassan-II; Referee: Redouane Jayid
	Penalties
	El Janati (penalty scored); Bouriga (penalty scored); El Jabali (penalty scored)		Saoud (penalty missed); Madické (penalty missed); El Harrak (penalty missed)

== Statistics ==
=== Squad appearances and goals ===
Last updated on 14 June 2024.

No.	Pos	Nat	Player	Total		Botola		Throne Cup	
No.	Pos	Nat	Player	Apps	Goals	Apps	Goals	Apps	Goals
Goalkeepers
1	GK	(Algeria) ALG	Gaya Merbah	25	-33	24	(-31)	1	(-2)
12	GK	(Morocco) MAR	Imad Askar	2	-4	2	(-4)	0	(0)
37	GK	(Morocco) MAR	Youssef Laghzal	0	0	0	(0)	0	(0)
72	GK	(Morocco) MAR	Badreddine Benachour	5	-2	4+1	(-2)	0	(0)
Defenders
2	DF	(Morocco) MAR	Youssef Chaina	13	1	8+4	1	0+1	0
4	DF	(Morocco) MAR	Mohamed Saoud	24	3	23	3	1	0
13	DF	(Morocco) MAR	Oussama Al Aiz	8	0	5+3	0	0	0
15	DF	(Morocco) MAR	Ayoub Jarfi	8	0	8	0	0	0
22	DF	(Morocco) MAR	Zakaria Kiani	27	1	23+3	0	1	1
23	DF	(Morocco) MAR	Anass Lamrabat	22	0	12+9	0	1	0
29	DF	(Senegal) SEN	El Hadji Youssoupha Konaté	22	0	20+1	0	1	0
31	DF	(Algeria) ALG	Walid Bencherifa	21	0	19+1	0	1	0
Midfielders
6	MF	(Morocco) MAR	Nouaman Aarab	6	0	4+2	0	0	0
8	MF	(Morocco) MAR	Abdelmottalib Faouzi	18	0	12+5	0	1	0
10	MF	(Morocco) MAR	Reda Jaadi	12	0	12	0	0	0
14	MF	(Morocco) MAR	Mohamed Said Bouksyr	22	0	11+10	0	0+1	0
16	MF	(Morocco) MAR	Ahmed Chentouf	17	1	14+2	1	1	0
17	MF	(Morocco) MAR	Abdelhamid Maâli	14	0	2+12	0	0	0
21	MF	(Morocco) MAR	Mahmoud El Kayssoumi	3	0	2+1	0	0	0
25	DF	(Morocco) MAR	Mohammed El Mehedi	1	0	0+1	0	0	0
26	MF	(Morocco) MAR	Salah Cheffani	1	0	0+1	0	0	0
34	MF	(Morocco) MAR	Yassine El Guartit	1	0	0+1	0	0	0
70	MF	(Morocco) MAR	Hamza Hassani	6	0	2+3	0	0+1	0
80	MF	(Senegal) SEN	El Hadji Madické Kane	28	6	27	5	1	1
Forwards
7	FW	(Morocco) MAR	Nabil Jaadi	7	0	0+7	0	0	0
9	FW	(Morocco) MAR	Ismail Khafi	29	13	28	13	1	0
11	FW	(Morocco) MAR	Abdellatif Akhrif	17	1	1+15	1	0+1	0
18	FW	(Morocco) MAR	Hamza El Wasti	26	1	22+3	1	0+1	0
19	FW	(Morocco) MAR	Jawad Ghabra	25	2	17+7	2	1	0
20	FW	(Morocco) MAR	Hassan Zraibi	9	1	3+6	1	0	0
28	FW	(Spain) ESP	Alexis Sánchez	9	0	7+2	0	0	0
30	FW	(Morocco) MAR	Ali El Harrak	12	0	0+11	0	0+1	0
93	FW	(Morocco) MAR	Zouhair El Ouassli	24	0	12+11	0	0+1	0
Players who have made an appearance or had a squad number this season but have left the club
5	MF	(Morocco) MAR	Mohsine Moutouali	2	0	2	0	0	0
2	DF	(Morocco) MAR	Ismail Laghzali	0	0	0	0	0	0
4	DF	(Morocco) MAR	Ismail El Alami	0	0	0	0	0	0
5	MF	(Morocco) MAR	Jalal Daoudi	3	0	2+1	0	0	0

=== Goalscorers ===
Rank	No.	Pos	Nat	Name	Botola	Throne Cup	Total
1	9	FW	(Morocco)	Ismail Khafi	13	0	13
2	80	MF	(Senegal)	El Hadji Madické Kane	5	1	6
3	19	FW	(Morocco)	Jawad Ghabra	3	0	3
3	4	DF	(Morocco)	Mohamed Saoud	3	0	3
5	20	FW	(Morocco)	Hassan Zraibi	1	0	1
5	18	FW	(Morocco)	Hamza El Wasti	1	0	1
5	16	MF	(Morocco)	Ahmed Chentouf	1	0	1
5	11	FW	(Morocco)	Abdellatif Akhrif	1	0	1
5	2	DF	(Morocco)	Youssef Chaina	1	0	1
5	22	DF	(Morocco)	Zakaria Kiani	0	1	1
TOTAL					29	2	31

=== Assists ===
Rank	No.	Pos	Nat	Name	Botola	Throne Cup	Total
1	18	FW	(Morocco)	Hamza El Wasti	4	0	4
2	19	FW	(Morocco)	Jawad Ghabra	2	0	2
2	31	DF	(Algeria)	Walid Bencherifa	2	0	2
2	80	MF	(Senegal)	El Hadji Madické Kane	2	0	2
5	92	DF	(Senegal)	El Hadji Youssoupha Konaté	1	0	1
5	10	MF	(Morocco)	Reda Jaadi	1	0	1
5	28	FW	(Spain)	Alexis Sánchez	1	0	1
5	17	FW	(Morocco)	Abdelhamid Maâli	1	0	1
5	22	DF	(Morocco)	Zakaria Kiani	1	0	1
5	14	MF	(Morocco)	Mohamed Said Bouksyr	1	0	1
5	9	FW	(Morocco)	Ismail Khafi	0	1	1
5	2	DF	(Morocco)	Youssef Chaina	0	1	1
TOTAL					16	2	18

=== Clean sheets ===
Last updated on 14 June 2024.

No	Name	Botola	Coupe du Trône	Total
1	(Algeria) Gaya	5/24	0/1	5/24
12	(Morocco) Askar	0/2	0/0	0/2
37	(Morocco) Laghzal	0/0	0/0	0/0
72	(Morocco) Benachour	2/5	0/0	2/5
Total		7/30	0/1	7/31

=== Disciplinary record ===
N	P	Nat.	Name	Botola			Coupe du Trône			Total			Notes
N	P	Nat.	Name	Yellow card	Second yellow card	Red card	Yellow card	Second yellow card	Red card	Yellow card	Second yellow card	Red card	Notes
1	GK	(Algeria)	Gaya Merbah	1						1			
2	DF	(Morocco)	Youssef Chaina	3						3			
4	DF	(Morocco)	Mohamed Saoud	7			1			8			
8	MF	(Morocco)	Abdelmottalib Faouzi	1			1			2			
9	FW	(Morocco)	Ismail Khafi	3						3			
10	MF	(Morocco)	Reda Jaadi	6						6			
11	FW	(Morocco)	Abdellatif Akhrif	2						2			
12	GK	(Morocco)	Imad Askar	1						1			
15	DF	(Morocco)	Ayoub Jarfi	2						2			
16	MF	(Morocco)	Ahmed Chentouf	3						3			
17	MF	(Morocco)	Abdelhamid Maâli	1						1			
19	FW	(Morocco)	Jawad Ghabra	6						6			
20	FW	(Morocco)	Hassan Zraibi	1						1			
22	DF	(Morocco)	Zakaria Kiani	5						5			
23	DF	(Morocco)	Anass Lamrabat	2						2			
29	DF	(Senegal)	El Hadji Youssoupha Konaté	5	1		1			6	1		
30	FW	(Morocco)	Ali El Harrak	1						1			
31	DF	(Algeria)	Walid Bencherifa	6			1			7			
72	GK	(Morocco)	Badreddine Benachour	1						1			
80	MF	(Senegal)	El Hadji Madické Kane	5						5			
93	FW	(Morocco)	Zouhair El Ouassli	3						3			
—		(Morocco)	Hilal Et-tair (coach)		1						1		
~~5~~	MF	(Morocco)	Jalal Daoudi	2						2			

Last updated: 14 June 2024
Source: goalzz.com
Only competitive matches
(yellow card) = Number of bookings; (second yellow card) = Number of sending offs after a second yellow card; (red card) = Number of sending offs by a direct red card.

=== Injury record ===
N	P	Nat.	Name	Type	Status	Source	Match	Inj. Date	Ret. Date
13	DF	(Morocco)	Oussama Al Aiz	Fracture in the fibula			in training	27 December 2023	9 March 2024
6	MF	(Morocco)	Nouaman Aarab	Foot tendon stretch			in training	27 December 2023	1 June 2024
12	GK	(Morocco)	Imad Askar	Knee injury			in training	27 December 2023	Unknown
15	DF	(Morocco)	Ayoub Jarfi	A simple stretch in the connective muscle			in training	27 December 2023	7 February 2024
11	FW	(Morocco)	Abdellatif Akhrif	Mild foot bruise			in training	December 2023	3 January 2024
14	GK	(Algeria)	Gaya Merbah	Sprained finger			in training	1 January 2024	7 February 2024

- Player is injured
- Player has recovered from injury
Last updated: 1 June 2024
Source: clubirt kooora.com

== See also ==
- 2015–16 IR Tanger season
- 2016–17 IR Tanger season
- 2017–18 IR Tanger season
- 2018–19 IR Tanger season
- 2019–20 IR Tanger season
- 2020–21 IR Tanger season
- 2021–22 IR Tanger season
- 2022–23 IR Tanger season
