= 2022–23 IR Tanger season =

Ittihad Tanger
2022–23 season
- President: Mohamed Ahagan (until 30 November); Mohammed Cherkaoui (elected; from 15 January)
- Manager: Ezzaki Badou (until 18 October); Hakim Daoudi (from 25 October, until 20 January); Hilal Et-tair (from 21 January)
- Stadium: Ibn Batouta Stadium
- Botola: 14th
- Moroccan Throne Cup: Round of 16
- Top goalscorer: League: Sofian El Moudane (5); All: Sofian El Moudane (6)
- Biggest win: IR Tanger 3–0 OC Khouribga
- Biggest defeat: AS FAR 4–0 IR Tanger
Home colours	Away colours	Third colours
- All statistics correct as of 23 June 2023.

The 2022–23 season is Ittihad Riadi Tanger's 40th season in existence and the club's 24th in the top flight of Moroccan football, and eighth consecutive.

== Kit ==
- Supplier: Gloria
- Club Sponsor: Tanger-Med (front)
- League Sponsor: Inwi (sleeves)

Home	Home (2nd Half of the season)	Home Alt	Away	Away Alt	Third

== Season review ==
=== July ===
On 12 July, Ittihad Tanger announced the dismissal of Juan Pedro Benali as the first team coach.

On 15 July, Ittihad Tanger announced the appointment of Ezzaki Badou as the new first team head coach until 2026.

On 20 July, Ittihad Tanger announced the signing of Jawad Ghabra from Nahdat Zemamra on a free transfer. On the same day, Ahmad Hamoudan signed with AS FAR after the expiration of his contract, ending ten years with the club.

On 31 July, Ittihad Tanger announced the signing of Zakaria Kiani from Youssoufia Berrechid on a free transfer. In the same day, the club announced the signing of Marwan Bakali from Widad Témara on a free transfer. Later that day, the club announced the signing of Joé Amian, and Mohammed Said Bouksyr both from Olympique Dcheira on a free transfer.

=== August ===
On 1 August, Ittihad Tanger announced the signing of goalkeeper Badreddine Benachour from Saudi club Al-Kawkab FC, the signing of Ismail El Alami from Chabab Fath Casablancais, Ayoub Rahmaoui, and Hassan Zraibi both from Kénitra AC on a free transfers.

On 2 August, Ittihad Tanger announced the signing of Abdelali El Asri from Chabab Alam Tanger and Mahmoud El Kayssoumi from Ajax Tanger, and announced the promotion of Yassine Dihaz, Saber Yazidi, Bilal El Hankouri, and Badreddin Bakkali from the Espoir team.

On 4 August, Ittihad Tanger announced the contract extension of Ayoub Jarfi until 2024.

On 5 August, Ittihad Tanger announced the signing of Aissa Sioudi on loan from Wydad AC.

On 16 August, Ittihad Tanger announced the signing of Donou Hubert from Al-Shabab SC, and Ngagne Fall from AS Génération Foot, both on free transfers.

On 21 August, Ittihad Tanger and Marwan Bakali have reached an agreement to terminate the player's contract.

On 27 August, Ittihad Tanger and Raja CA reached an agreement for the transfer of Axel Méyé.

=== September ===
On 3 September, Ittihad Tanger announced the signing of Adnan Souiss from WA Fes on a free transfer.

On 5 September, Ittihad Tanger announced the signing of Mohamed Souboul on loan from Raja CA.

On 10 September, Ittihad Tanger announced the signing of Abdou Atchabao from MAS Fes on a free transfer.

=== October ===
On 18 October, Ittihad Tanger announces the termination of its contract with coach Badou Ezzaki.

=== January ===
On 15 January, Mohammed Cherkaoui was elected as the new club president.

On 21 January, Ittihad Tanger announced the appointment of Hilal Ettair as the new first team head coach. In the same day, IRT announced the signing of goalkeeper Zouhair Laaroubi on a free transfer.

On 22 January, Ittihad Tanger announced the signing of Mohsine Moutouali from Al Ahli Tripoli, and Amine Sadiki from Shabaab al Jabal, both on free transfers.

On 25 January, Ittihad Tanger announced the signing of the former midfielder Sofian El Moudane from RS Berkane and defender El Hadji Youssoupha Konaté on a free transfer.

On 27 January, Ittihad Tanger announced signing of the former midfielder Hatim Chentouf from Hassania Agadir on a free transfer.

On 31 January, Ittihad Tanger announced the signing of the two wingers Ali El Harrak, and Sabir Achefay from VV Noordwijk on a free transfer. The club also announced the signing of Mouhcine Rabja on loan from Difaâ Hassani El Jadidi.

=== February ===
On 1 February, Ittihad Tanger announced the signing of goalkeeper Gaya Merbah on loan from Raja CA.

On 2 February, Ittihad Tanger announced the signing of Zouhair El Ouassli from Olympic Azzaweya SC on a free transfer.

=== June ===
On 20 June, Ittihad Tanger was able to ensure survival in the first division after a bad first half of the season, in which it achieved only two points.

== Squad ==
As of match played 23 June 2023

No.	Name	Nationality	Position	Date of birth (age)	Signed from	Signed in	Contract ends	Apps.	Goals
Goalkeepers
1	Gaya Merbah	(Algeria)	GK	22 July 1994 (age 32)	Raja CA (loan)	2023	2023	16	(-13)
12	Imad Askar	(Morocco)	GK	29 May 1998 (age 28)	MA Tétouan	2018	2024	4	(-9)
94	Badreddine Benachour	(Morocco)	GK	9 August 1994 (age 32)	Al-Kawkab FC	2022	2024	8	(-11)
99	Zouhair Laaroubi	(Morocco)	GK	30 July 1984 (age 42)	Maghreb AS	2023	2023	1	(-2)
Defenders
3	Hatim El Ouahabi	(Morocco)	LB	3 October 1999 (age 27)	Widad-Juventud	2017	2024	69	1
4	Ismail El Alami	(Morocco)	DF	1 January 2000 (age 26)	CC Fath A Casablanca	2022	2025	4	0
13	Oussama Al Aiz	(Morocco)	DF	26 January 1999 (age 27)	Academy	2020		26	0
15	Ayoub Jarfi	(Morocco)	DF	8 March 1996 (age 30)	Academy	2016	2024	125	2
20	Mouhcine Rabja	(Morocco)	DF	6 May 1994 (age 32)	DH Jadidi (loan)	2023	2023	15	2
21	Mohamed Souboul	(Morocco)	DF	17 November 2001 (age 24)	Raja CA (loan)	2022	2023	23	0
22	Zakaria Kiani	(Morocco)	RB	22 January 1997 (age 29)	CAY Berrechid	2022	2024	24	1
24	Saber Yazidi	(Morocco)	DF	1 August 2001 (age 25)	Academy	2022	2025	1	0
27	Ayoub El Rahmmaouy	(Morocco)	DF	10 July 1997 (age 29)	Kénitra AC	2022	2024	15	0
28	Abdelatif Noussir	(Morocco)	RB	20 February 1990 (age 36)	MA Tétouan	2021	2023	24	0
92	El Hadji Youssoupha Konaté	(Senegal)	DF	6 May 1994 (age 32)	Free agent	2023 (2)	2024	102	7
Midfielders
5	Mohsine Moutouali (captain)	(Morocco)	MF	3 March 1986 (age 40)	Al Ahli SC	2023	2023	17	3
6	Nouaman Aarab (vice captain)	(Morocco)	MF	27 August 1990 (age 36)	CA Khénifra	2017	2023	159	5
8	Abdelmottalib Faouzi	(Morocco)	MF	19 July 1993 (age 33)	CR Bernoussi	2019	2023	64	5
10	Abdellah El Moudene	(Algeria)	MF	11 February 1994 (age 32)	MC Oujda	2021	2023	23	1
14	Mohamed Said Bouksyr	(Morocco)	MF	28 March 1997 (age 29)	O Dcheira	2022	2024	26	0
16	Mahmoud El Kayssoumi	(Morocco)	MF	22 February 2002 (age 24)	CS Ajax Tanger	2022	2025	6	0
23	Ahmed Chentouf (3rd captain)	(Morocco)	MF	5 December 1996 (age 29)	HUS Agadir (A)	2023 (2)	2023	114	5
31	Youssef Benali	(Morocco) (France)	MF	4 February 1995 (age 31)	Bourges 18	2021	2023	48	3
42	Sofian El Moudane	(France) (Morocco)	MF	16 March 1994 (age 32)	RS Berkane	2023 (2)	2023	33	10
61	Badreddine Bakkali	(Morocco)	MF	8 February 2002 (age 24)	Academy	2022	2025	6	0
66	Mohamed Yassine Dihaz	(Morocco)	MF	1 January 2003 (age 23)	Academy	2022	2025	7	0
70	Hamza Hassani Boouia	(Morocco)	MF	24 March 1995 (age 31)	CR Al Hoceima	2021	2024	24	0
Forwards
7	Hassan Zraibi	(Morocco)	FW	1 October 1997 (age 29)	Kénitra AC	2022	2024	24	2
9	Mouad Ajendouz	(Morocco)	FW	18 February 2002 (age 24)	Mohammed VI FA	2021	2023	0	0
11	Abdellatif Akhrif	(Morocco)	FW	1 February 2000 (age 26)	Academy	2020	2026	57	3
17	Djama Joé Amian	(Ivory Coast)	FW	13 January 1997 (age 29)	O Dcheira	2022	2024	27	2
19	Jawad Ghabra	(Morocco)	FW	9 November 1994 (age 32)	RCA Zemamra	2022	2024	0	0
30	Ali El Harrak	(Morocco) (Spain)	FW	31 July 1997 (age 29)	Free agent	2023	2023	8	0
33	Bilal El Hankouri	(Morocco)	FW	4 May 2001 (age 25)	Academy	2022	2025	1	0
34	Sabir Achefay	(Netherlands) (Morocco)	FW	21 November 1995 (age 30)	VV Noordwijk	2023	2023	3	0
45	Abdou Atchabao	(Gabon) (Togo)	FW	7 November 1990 (age 36)	Maghreb AS	2022	2024	13	0
55	Zakaria Benlamachi	(Morocco)	FW	25 July 1994 (age 32)	Al-Entesar C	2023	2023	12	1
93	Zouhair El Ouassli	(Morocco)	FW	11 August 1993 (age 33)	Al-Olympique SC	2023	2023	15	1
Players who have left the club during the season
26	Marwan Bakali	(Morocco)	MF	1 January 2001 (age 25)	WS Témara	2022	2025	0	0
1	Aissa Sioudi	(Morocco)	GK	20 September 1997 (age 29)	Wydad AC (loan)	2022	2023	7	(-10)
25	Ngagne Fall	(Senegal)	FW	7 August 1999 (age 27)	AS Génération Foot	2022	2025	8	0
5	Adnan Souiss	(Morocco)	DF	17 March 1999 (age 27)	Wydad Fes	2022	2025	4	0
77	Abdelali Asri	(Morocco)	FW	25 March 1996 (age 30)	C Alam Tanger (A)	2022 (2)	2025	15	0
—	Amine Sadiki	(Morocco)	LB	17 July 1986 (age 40)	S Al-Jabal C	2023	2023	0	0
18	Donou Hubert	(Togo)	MF	3 November 1998 (age 28)	Al-Shabab SC	2022	2025	5	0

- (A) = originally from the academy

=== From youth squad ===
No.	Name	Nationality	Position	Date of birth (age)	Signed from	Signed in	Contract ends	Apps.	Goals
2	Ismail Laghzali	(Morocco)	DF	12 February 2003 (age 23)	Mohammed VI FA	2022	2025	9	0
26	Salaheddine Cheffani	(Morocco)	MF	27 June 2004 (age 22)	Mohammed VI FA	2022	2025	1	0
29	Ahmed Harboul	(Morocco)	MF	2 October 2003 (age 23)	Mohammed VI FA	2022	2025	0	0
71	Abdelhamid Maâli	(Morocco)	MF	16 March 2006 (age 20)	Academy	2022	2027	0	0
—	Abdlah Rouass	(Morocco)	MF	1 January 2001 (age 25)	Academy	2022	2024	0	0

=== On Loan ===
No.	Name	Nationality	Position	Date of birth (age)	Signed from	Signed in	Contract ends	Apps.	Goals	to	until
—	Abdellah Amghar	(Morocco)	GK	1 January 2001 (age 25)	Academy	2022	2024	0	0	JO Ouezzane	30 June 2023
—	Bilal Akhedim	(Morocco)	DF	1 January 2001 (age 25)	Academy	2022	2024	1	0	AUS Ben Tayeb	30 June 2023
—	Mourad Hmamou	(Morocco)	MF	1 January 2001 (age 25)	Academy	2021	2024	0	0	AUS Ben Tayeb	30 June 2023
77	Abdelali Asri	(Morocco)	FW	25 March 1996 (age 30)	C Alam Tanger (A)	2022 (2)	2025	15	0	C Alam Tanger	30 June 2023

== Transfers ==
=== In ===
No.	Pos	Player	Transferred from	Fee	Date	Source
19	FW	(Morocco) Jawad Ghabra	RCA Zemamra	Free Transfer	20 July 2022	
22	DF	(Morocco) Zakaria Kiani	CAY Berrechid	Free Transfer	31 July 2022	
26	MF	(Morocco) Marwan Bakali	WS Témara	Free Transfer	31 July 2022	
17	FW	(Ivory Coast) Joé Amian	O Dcheira	Free Transfer	31 July 2022	
14	MF	(Morocco) Mohamed Said Bouksyr	O Dcheira	Free Transfer	31 July 2022	
94	GK	(Morocco) Badreddine Benachour	(Saudi Arabia) Al-Kawkab FC	Free Transfer	1 August 2022	
4	DF	(Morocco) Ismail El Alami	CC Fath A Casablanca	Free Transfer	1 August 2022	
27	DF	(Morocco) Ayoub El Rahmmaouy	Kénitra AC	Free Transfer	1 August 2022	
7	FW	(Morocco) Hassan Zraibi	Kénitra AC	Free Transfer	1 August 2022	
77	MF	(Morocco) Abdelali Asri	C Alam Tanger	Free Transfer	2 August 2022	
16	MF	(Morocco) Mahmoud El Kayssoumi	CS Ajax Tanger	Free Transfer	2 August 2022	
18	MF	(Togo) Donou Hubert	(Kuwait) Al-Shabab SC	Free Transfer	16 August 2022	
25	FW	(Senegal) Ngagne Fall	(Senegal) A Génération Foot	Free Transfer	16 August 2022	
5	DF	(Morocco) Adnan Souiss	WA Fes	Free Transfer	3 September 2022	
45	FW	(Gabon) Abdou Atchabao	Maghreb AS	Free Transfer	10 September 2022	
99	GK	(Morocco) Zouhair Laaroubi	Maghreb AS	Free Transfer	20 January 2023	
5	MF	(Morocco) Mohsine Moutouali	(Libya) Al Ahli SC	Free Transfer	21 January 2023	
—	DF	(Morocco) Amine Sadiki	(Libya) S Al-Jabal C	Free Transfer	21 January 2023	
42	MF	(Morocco) Sofian El Moudane	RS Berkane	Free Transfer	25 January 2023	
92	DF	(Senegal) El Hadji Youssoupha Konaté	Free agent	Free Transfer	25 January 2023	
23	MF	(Morocco) Hatim Chentouf	HUS Agadir	Free Transfer	27 January 2023	
—	MF	(Morocco) Abdlah Rouass	AUS Ben Tayeb	Loan return	28 January 2023	
30	FW	(Morocco) Ali El Harrak	Free agent	Free Transfer	31 January 2023	
34	FW	(Morocco) Sabir Achefay	(Netherlands) VV Noordwijk	Free Transfer	31 January 2023	
93	FW	(Morocco) Zouhair El Ouassli	(Libya) Al-Olympique SC	Free Transfer	2 February 2023	
55	FW	(Morocco) Zakaria Benlamachi	(Saudi Arabia) Al-Entesar C	Free Transfer	24 January 2023	

=== Promoted ===
No.	Pos	Player	Contract Until	Date	Source
66	MF	(Morocco) Mohamed Yassine Dihaz	2025	2 August 2022	
24	DF	(Morocco) Saber Yazidi	2025	2 August 2022	
33	FW	(Morocco) Bilal El Hankouri	2025	2 August 2022	
61	MF	(Morocco) Badreddine Bakkali Mouden	2025	2 August 2022	

=== Loans in ===
No.	Pos	Player	Loaned from	Fee	Date	On loan until	Source
1	GK	(Morocco) Aissa Sioudi	Wydad AC	None	5 August 2022	End of season	
21	DF	(Morocco) Mohamed Souboul	Raja CA	None	5 September 2022	End of season	
20	DF	(Morocco) Mouhcine Rabja	DH Jadidi	None	31 January 2023	End of season	
1	GK	(Algeria) Gaya Merbah	Raja CA	None	1 February 2022	End of season	

=== Contract renewals ===
No.	Pos.	Player	Contract length	Contract ends	Date	Ref.
15	DF	(Morocco) Ayoub Jarfi	2-year	2024	4 August 2022	

=== Out ===
No.	Pos	Player	Transferred to	Fee	Date	Source
7	FW	(Morocco) Ahmad Hamoudan	AS FAR	Free Transfer	6 July 2022	
5	MF	(Morocco) Mohammed Ali Bemammer	Maghreb AS	Free Transfer	6 July 2022	
20	DF	(Morocco) Mohamed Ayman Sadil	OC Khouribga	Free Transfer	6 July 2022	
29	DF	(Senegal) El Hadji Youssoupha Konaté	Free agent	Free Transfer	6 July 2022	
10	MF	(Morocco) Kahled Serroukh	(Libya) Al Akhdar SC	Contract termination	16 August 2022	
65	GK	(Morocco) Hicham El Mejhed	HUS Agadir	Contract termination	20 August 2022	
26	MF	(Morocco) Marwan Bakali	WS Témara	Contract termination	21 August 2022	
11	FW	(Gabon) Axel Méyé	Raja CA	Undisclosed (Note: Fee reported as 3.500.000 MAD ($550.000), 30% of the amount will go to the previous player's club CR Al Hoceima, and IR Tanger will receive a 20% for any future sale.)	27 August 2022	
76	FW	(Morocco) Taoufik Ijroten	MA Tétouan	Contract termination	29 August 2022	
40	DF	(Morocco) Mehdi Khallati	HUS Agadir	Contract termination	9 September 2022	
19	FW	(Morocco) Hamza Ibrahimi	CS Ajax Tanger		11 September 2022	
55	GK	(Morocco) Tarik Aoutah	Free agent	Contract termination		
4	DF	(Morocco) Abdelhakim Aklidou	(Iraq) Al-Minaa SC	Contract termination	15 September 2022	
14	MF	(Morocco) Habib Allah Dahmani	MC Oujda	Contract termination	15 September 2022	
17	FW	(Morocco) Hamdi Laachir	later AS Salé	Contract termination		
1	GK	(Morocco) Aissa Sioudi	Wydad AC	Loan return	27 January 2023	
25	FW	(Senegal) Ngagne Fall	(Czech Republic) FK Příbram	Contract termination	27 January 2023	
5	DF	(Morocco) Adnan Souiss		Contract termination	27 January 2023	
18	MF	(Togo) Donou Hubert		Contract termination	11 June 2023	

=== Loans out ===
No.	Pos	Player	Loaned to	Fee	Date	On loan until	Source
30	MF	(Morocco) Mourad Hmamou	AUS Ben Tayeb	None	25 August 2022	End of Season	
—	MF	(Morocco) Abdlah Rouass	AUS Ben Tayeb	None	25 August 2022	End of Season	
22	DF	(Morocco) Bilal Akhedim	AUS Ben Tayeb	None	25 August 2022	End of Season	
—	GK	(Morocco) Abdellah Amghar	JO Ouezzane	None	25 August 2022	End of Season	
77	FW	(Morocco) Abdelali Asri	C Alam Tanger	None	7 February 2023	End of Season	

== Board of directors ==
Position	Name
President	Mohammed Cherkaoui
Managing Director	Mohamed Hmami
First Vice President	Mohamed Boulaich
Second Vice President	Abdelhanin Gharafi
Third Vice President	Rachid El Hassani
Fourth Vice President	Anass Lamrabat
General Secretary	Abdellah El Mrabet Dajidi
Vice General Secretary	Issam El Ghachi
Treasurer	Redouan Bouhdid
Vice Treasurer	Said Zekri

== Technical staff ==
Position	Name
First team head coach	(Morocco) Ezzaki Badou

until 18 October 2022.

Position	Name
Assistant coach	(Morocco) Hassan Fadil

until 25 October 2022.

Position	Name
First team head coach	(Morocco) Hakim Daoudi

until 20 January 2023.

Position	Name
Assistant coach	(Morocco) Khalid Bahida

until 25 January 2023.

Position	Name
First team head coach	(Morocco) Hilal Et-tair
Assistant coach	(Morocco) Abdelouahed Benkacem
Fitness coach	(Morocco) Rachid Blej
Goalkeeping coach	(Morocco) Mohammed Bestara
Performance analyst	(Morocco) Ahmed Zekhnini
Club doctor	(Morocco) Houssine Azizi
Physiotherapists	(Morocco) Nacereddine Jabouri
Healer	(Morocco) Abdelmonhem Nafie
Delegate	(Morocco) Ali Haddou
Hope's Team coach	(Morocco) Khalid Bahida
Hope's Team Assistant Coach	(Morocco) Youssef Sekour
Hope's Team Fitness coach	(Morocco) Ahmed Azmi
Formation center manager	(Morocco) Abdelhakim Ben Saddik

== Pre-season and friendlies ==
5 August 2022 1	IR Tanger (Morocco)	3–0	(Morocco) AS Salé	Tanger, Morocco
17:30 UTC+1	Zraibi; El Alami; Yazidi	Report		Stadium: Stade Village Ziaten

13 August 2022 2	C Wafa Wydad (Morocco)	0–9	(Morocco) IR Tanger	Casablanca, Morocco
16:00 UTC+1		Report	Benali; Akhrif; Fall; El Kayssoumi; Ajandouz; Zraibi; Rhabra; Joé Amian	Stadium: Stade Moulay Rachid
Note: The match was played in 4 rounds, each round lasting 40 minutes to engage all players.

17 August 2022 3	SCC Mohammédia (Morocco)	0–0	(Morocco) IR Tanger	Mohammédia, Morocco
17:30 UTC+1		Report		Stadium: Stade El Bachir

18 August 2022 4	CJ Ben Guerir (Morocco)	0–0	(Morocco) IR Tanger	El Jadida, Morocco
17:30 UTC+1		Report		Stadium: Stade El Abdi

20 August 2022 5	JS Soualem (Morocco)	Cancelled	(Morocco) IR Tanger	El Jadida / Casablanca, Morocco
17:30 UTC+1				Stadium: Stade El Abdi / Stade Moulay Rachid
Note: The match was canceled for technical reasons, after the two teams were drawn in the first match in the Botola Pro.

24 August 2022 6	Fath US (Morocco)	1–0	(Morocco) IR Tanger	Rabat, Morocco
18:00 UTC+1	Ayoub Nanah	Report		Stadium: Stade Moulay Hassan

24 September 2022 7	US Touarga (Morocco)	0–0	(Morocco) IR Tanger	Rabat, Morocco
12:00 UTC+1		Report		Stadium: Center

5 February 2023 8	Raja CA (Morocco)	2–1	(Morocco) IR Tanger	Casablanca, Morocco
12:00 UTC+1	Hafidi; Habti	Report	Amian	Stadium: Raja CA Academy

15 February 2023 9	CHA Tanger (Morocco)	1–3	(Morocco) IR Tanger	Tanger, Morocco
14:00 UTC+1		Report		Stadium: Stade Village Ziaten

22 March 2023 10	CHA Tanger (Morocco)	1–6	(Morocco) IR Tanger	Tanger, Morocco
11:00 UTC		Report		Stadium: Stade Village Ziaten

29 March 2023 11	IR Tanger (Morocco)	1–1	(Morocco) MA Tetouan	Tanger, Morocco
22:00 UTC	Atchabao	Report; Report	Abba	Stadium: Stade Village Ziaten
Note: The match was played in three rounds (40 minutes for the first, and 30 for the last two) to give all players the opportunity to participate.

28 April 2023 12	IR Tanger (Morocco)	1–1	(Morocco) MA Tetouan	Tanger, Morocco
17:00 UTC+1	Faouzi	Report; Report	Abba	Stadium: Stade Village Ziaten
Note: The match was played in three rounds (35 minutes each) to give all players the opportunity to participate.

13 May 2023 13	IR Tanger (Morocco)	0–1	(Morocco) MA Tetouan	Tanger, Morocco
13:00 UTC		Report	Abba	Stadium: Stade Village Ziaten

2 June 2023 14	Fath US (Morocco)	2–2	(Morocco) IR Tanger	Rabat, Morocco
17:00 UTC+1	Louadni 28'; Azri 39'	Report; Report	Zraibi; Hassani	Stadium: Stade Moulay Hassan

== Competitions ==
Win Draw Loss

=== Overview ===
Competition	First match	Last match	Starting round	Final position	Record							
Competition	First match	Last match	Starting round	Final position	Pld	W	D	L	GF	GA	GD	Win %
Botola	3 September 2022	23 June 2023	Matchday 1	14th	30	8	5	17	23	39	−16	26.67
Throne Cup	10 February 2023	12 April 2023	Round of 32	Round of 16	2	1	1	0	3	1	+2	50.00
Total					32	9	6	17	26	40	−14	28.13

Last updated: 23 June 2023.
Source: Competitions

=== Botola ===
==== Standings ====
Pos	Team	Pld	W	D	L	GF	GA	GD	Pts	Qualification or relegation
12	SCC Mohammédia	30	8	7	15	27	36	−9	31	
13	Moghreb Tétouan	30	6	12	12	28	41	−13	30	
14	Ittihad Tanger	30	8	5	17	23	39	−16	29	
15	Olympique Khouribga (R)	30	5	13	12	29	36	−7	28	Relegation to Botola 2
16	Difaâ El Jadidi (R)	30	5	10	15	24	44	−20	25	Relegation to Botola 2

Updated to match(es) played on 23 June 2023. Source: FRMF.ma
Rules for classification: 1) Points; 2a) Head-to-head goal difference if they are two teams with equal points; 2b) Goal difference if they are more than two teams with equal points; 3) Number of wins; 4) Goals scored; 5) Play-off between involved teams.
(R) Relegated

==== Results summary ====
Overall								Home						Away					
Pld	W	D	L	GF	GA	GD	Pts	W	D	L	GF	GA	GD	W	D	L	GF	GA	GD
30	8	5	17	23	39	−16	29	6	2	7	15	15	0	2	3	10	8	24	−16

Last updated: 23 June 2023.
Source: goalzz.com

==== Results by round ====
Round	1	2	3	4	5	6	7	8	9	10	11	12	13	14	15	16	17	18	19	20	21	22	23	24	25	26	27	28	29	30
Ground	H	A	H	A	H	A	H	A	A	H	A	H	A	H	A	A	H	A	H	A	H	A	H	H	A	H	A	H	A	H
Result	L	L	L	L	D	L	L	D	L	L	L	L	L	L	L	L	W	L	W	L	W	W	W	W	D	D	D	W	W	L
Position	13	16	16	16	16	16	16	16	16	16	16	16	16	16	16	16	16	16	16	16	16	16	15	15	15	15	15	14	14	14

Updated to match(es) played on 23 June 2023. Source: Botola
A = Away; H = Home; W = Win; D = Draw; L = Loss

==== Matches ====
3 September 2022 1	IR Tanger	0–1	JS Soualem	Mohammédia
18:00 UTC+1	N.Aarab (yellow card) 69'	Report	Sillah (yellow card) 23'; Sahd 47'; Traore (yellow card) 90+1'	Stadium: Stade El Bachir; Referee: Youssef Triki
Note: Because the grass of Ibn Batouta Stadium was not ready, the team hosted at El Bachir Stadium.

9 September 2022 2	MA Tétouan	1–0	IR Tanger	Tétouan
16:00 UTC+1	El Hasnaoui (yellow card) 18'; Saoud (red card) 45+3'; Kamal 63'	Report	Benali (yellow card) 9'; A.El Rahmmaouy (red card) 55'; H.Donou (yellow card) 74'	Stadium: Stade Saniat Rmel; Referee: Samir Guezzaz

17 September 2022 3	IR Tanger	0–2	HUS Agadir	Tanger
19:15 UTC+1	Aarab (yellow card) 36'; Z.Kiani (yellow card) 47'	Report	Ben Choug 11' (yellow card) 33'; Souissi (yellow card) 60'; El Mejhed (yellow card) 84'; Kati 90+6'	Stadium: Ibn Batouta Stadium; Referee: Saad Warid

1 October 2022 4	OC Safi	1–0	IR Tanger	Safi
18:15 UTC+1	Najari 27'; Haba (yellow card) 29'; Lamirat (yellow card) 51'; Mehri (yellow card) 73'	Report	Hubert (yellow card) 46' (red card) 74'; Aarab (yellow card) 61'	Stadium: Stade El Massira; Referee: Yassine Bouslim

16 October 2022 6	Fath US	1–0	IR Tanger	Rabat
18:15 UTC+1	Hanouri 20'; Azri (yellow card) 90+8'	Report	El Alami (yellow card) 57' (red card) 90+1'	Stadium: Stade Moulay Hassan; Referee: Hicham Tamssamani

19 October 2022 5	IR Tanger	0–0	Wydad AC	Tanger
18:15 UTC+1	El Kayssoumi (yellow card) 68'	Report	Aouk (red card) 52'; Jabrane (yellow card) 59'	Stadium: Ibn Batouta Stadium; Attendance: 0. Referee: Hamza El Fareq
Note: The match, originally scheduled for 7 October 2022, was pushed back because of the involvement of Wydad AC at the 2022–23 CAF Champions League.

28 October 2022 7	IR Tanger	2–3	Maghreb AS	Tanger
18:00 UTC+1	Amian (red card) 37'; Akhrif 45' (yellow card) 45'; Faouzi 60'; Benachour (yellow card) 74'	Report	Astati 20'; Ouadrassi 53'; El Fakih 77' (pen.)	Stadium: Ibn Batouta Stadium; Referee: Redouane Jiyed

6 November 2022 8	OC Khouribga	1–1	IR Tanger	Khouribga
16:00 UTC+1	Amimi (yellow card) 23'; Orebonye (yellow card) 45+1'; Bencherifa (yellow card) 45+1'; Morsil 90+3'	Report	Zraibi 42'; Benachour (yellow card) 63'	Stadium: Complexe OCP; Referee: Mohamed Bellout

27 December 2022 9	RS Berkane	2–1	IR Tanger	Berkane
20:30 UTC+1	El Bahraoui (yellow card) 38'; El Helali 55'; El Bahri 76'; Labhiri (yellow card) 90+6'	Report	Laghzali (yellow card) 48'; Faouzi (yellow card) 52' (goal) 72' (pen.); Kiani (yellow card) 90+8'	Stadium: Stade Municipal de Berkane; Referee: Reddad Eddaki

3 January 2023 10	IR Tanger	0–2	MC Oujda	Tétouan
16:00 UTC+1	Aarab (yellow card) 52'	Report	Bassène 14', 30'; Nouader (yellow card) 67'; Serrhat (yellow card) 90'	Stadium: Stade Saniat Rmel; Attendance: 0 Referee: Yassine Bouslim
Note: Because Ibn Batouta Stadium was under maintenance in preparation for the 2022 FIFA Club World Cup, the team hosted at Saniat Rmel Stadium.

6 January 2023 11	Raja CA	3–0	IR Tanger	Casablanca
20:30 UTC+1	Khabba 28', 54'; Harkass 44'	Report	Hubert (yellow card) 3'	Stadium: Stade Mohamed V Referee: Adil Zourak

14 January 2023 12	IR Tanger	0–1	US Touarga	Tétouan
20:30 UTC+1	Faouzi (yellow card) 39'; Kiani (yellow card) 86'; Benali (yellow card) 90+8'	Report	Mbangossoum (yellow card) 12'; Zouhzouh 61' (pen.); Manaout (yellow card) 90+8'; Diedhiou (yellow card) 90+9'	Stadium: Stade Saniat Rmel; Attendance: 0 Referee: Jalal Jayed
Note: Because Ibn Batouta Stadium was under maintenance in preparation for the 2022 FIFA Club World Cup, the team hosted at Saniat Rmel Stadium.

18 January 2023 13	DH El Jadida	2–1	IR Tanger	El Jadida
20:30 UTC+1	Lakhmidi 26'; Juma (penalty missed) 38'; Farah 77'	Report	Kiani 62'	Stadium: Stade El Abdi; Referee: El Hannafi Saadi

22 January 2023 14	IR Tanger	0–1	SCC Mohammédia	El Jadida
18:15 UTC+1	Kiani (yellow card) 12'; Jarfi (yellow card) 45+2'; Benali (yellow card) 60'; Faouzi (red card) 83'	Report	Ennakhli 30'; Safsafi (yellow card) 54'	Stadium: Stade El Abdi; Referee: Reddad Eddaki
Note: Because Ibn Batouta Stadium was under maintenance in preparation for the 2022 FIFA Club World Cup, the team hosted at El Abdi Stadium.

25 January 2023 15	AS FAR	4–0	IR Tanger	Kenitra
16:00 UTC+1	Sahd 10', 56'; Diakite 21'; Fati 80'; Mané (yellow card) 90+5'	Report		Stadium: Stade Municipal; Referee: Saad Warid

28 January 2023 16	JS Soualem	2–0	IR Tanger	Mohammédia
20:30 UTC+1	Aznag (yellow card) 24'; Maouhoub 60' (pen.); Sillah (yellow card) 72' (goal) 90+1'; M. Majid (yellow card) 79'; Sabyh (yellow card) 87'; Rharib (yellow card) 89'	Report	S. El Moudane (yellow card) 51'; Moutouali (yellow card) 61'; Faouzi (yellow card) 65'; Konaté (yellow card) 76'; Zraibi (yellow card) 84'	Stadium: Stade El Bachir; Referee: Nabil Benrqia

21 February 2023 17	IR Tanger	2–0	MA Tétouan	Tanger
18:15 UTC+1	El Ouassli 7' (yellow card) 7'; Moutouali 18'; El Moudane (yellow card) 49'; Achefay (yellow card) 80'	Report	Lakohal (yellow card) 9'; Krouch (yellow card) 58'; Kamal (yellow card) 85'	Stadium: Ibn Batouta Stadium; Referee: Redouane Jiyed
Note: The match, originally scheduled for 19 February 2023, was pushed back to 21 February for security reasons.

25 February 2023 18	HUS Agadir	1–0	IR Tanger	Agadir
18:15 UTC+1	Lakhdar (yellow card) 54'; Souissi (yellow card) 67'; Mehri (penalty missed) 75' (yellow card) 90+8'; Ech-Chemmakh 90+1'; Ben Choug (yellow card) 90+10'	Report	Benali (yellow card) 39'; Bouksyr (yellow card) 56'; El Ouassli (red card) 66'; Benlamachi (yellow card) 67'; Aarab (yellow card) 75' (red card) 88'	Stadium: Stade Adrar; Referee: Mustapha Kechaf

4 March 2023 19	IR Tanger	2–1	OC Safi	Tétouan
16:00 UTC+1	Rabja 41' (yellow card) 70'; El Moudane (yellow card) 46' (goal) 82'; Benlamachi (yellow card) 88'	Report	Rhailouf (yellow card) 33'; Diarra (red card) 45+2'; Michte 63'; Qassaq (yellow card) 77'	Stadium: Stade Saniat Rmel; Attendance: 0 Referee: Karim Sabry
Note: Because Ibn Batouta Stadium was under maintenance in preparation for the Match between Morocco and Brazil, the team hosted at Saniat Rmel Stadium.

14 March 2023 20	Wydad AC	3–0	IR Tanger	Casablanca
18:15 UTC+1	Sambou 5', 26'; Ounajem 33'; El Amloud (yellow card) 38'	Report	Moutouali (penalty missed) 21'; Benlamachi (yellow card) 77'	Stadium: Stade Mohamed V Referee: Yassine Bouslim
Note: The match, originally scheduled for 7 March 2023, was pushed back because of the involvement of Wydad AC at the 2022–23 CAF Champions League.

3 April 2023 21	IR Tanger	1–0	Fath US	Tanger
22:00 UTC+1	El Moudane (penalty missed) 16'; Souboul (yellow card) 26'; Konaté (yellow card) 45'; Amian 72'; Benali (yellow card) 90+4'	Report		Stadium: Ibn Batouta Stadium; Referee: Hamza El Fareq

7 April 2023 22	Maghreb AS	0–1	IR Tanger	Fez
22:00 UTC+1	Astati (yellow card) 69'; Rami (yellow card) 76'	Report	Souboul (yellow card) 19'; Konaté 52'; Kiani (yellow card) 79'	Stadium: Fez Stadium; Referee: Mustapha Kechchaf

16 April 2023 23	IR Tanger	3–0	OC Khouribga	Tanger
22:00 UTC+1	Moutouali 9' (pen.) (yellow card) 53'; Aarab (yellow card) 24'; Benlamachi 47'; Benali (yellow card) 90+3'; El Moudane 90+8'	Report	Rahim (yellow card) 7'; Karkache (yellow card) 26'; Essafi (yellow card) 90+3'	Stadium: Ibn Batouta Stadium; Referee: Karim Sabry

20 April 2023 24	IR Tanger	2–1	RS Berkane	Tanger
22:00 UTC+1	Rabja 71'; El Moudane (yellow card) 76'; Et-tair (coach) (yellow card) 85'; Konaté 90+1'; Laaroubi (bench) (yellow card) 90+10'	Report	El Bahri 8'; Lukombe (yellow card) 49'; Hamiani (yellow card) 84'; Fekkak (yellow card) 90'; Dayo (yellow card) 90+11'	Stadium: Ibn Batouta Stadium; Referee: Abderrahim Arrakhiz

5 May 2023 25	MC Oujda	0–0	IR Tanger	Oujda
19:15 UTC+1	Serbout (yellow card) 52'; Serrhat (yellow card) 81'	Report	Bouksyr (yellow card) 57'; Aarab (yellow card) 85'	Stadium: Honneur Stadium; Referee: Redouane Jiyed

21 May 2023 26	IR Tanger	0–0	Raja CA	Tanger
20:00 UTC+1	Bouksyr (yellow card) 37'; Amian (red card) 66'; Benlamachi (yellow card) 85'; Akhrif (yellow card) 90+6'	Report	Aholou (yellow card) 19'; Boulacsoute (red card) 54'; Hadhoudi (yellow card) 85'	Stadium: Ibn Batouta Stadium; Referee: Samir Guezzaz

14 June 2023 27	US Touarga	2–2	IR Tanger	Rabat
20:00 UTC+1	(yellow card) 9'; Zouhzouh 10'; Y. El Khalej (yellow card) 11'; A. El Khalej 64' (pen.) (yellow card) 90+9' (yellow-red card) 90+10'; Khaloua (yellow card) 86'	Report	El Moudane 5', 27'; El Ouassli (yellow card) 43'; Benlamachi (yellow card) 90+9' (yellow-red card) 90+11'	Stadium: Stade Moulay Hassan; Referee: Mustapha Kechaf

17 June 2023 28	IR Tanger	1–0	DH El Jadida	Tanger
20:00 UTC+1	Gaya (yellow card) 75'; Rabja (yellow card) 78'; Konaté 79'	Report	El Hanoudi (yellow card) 75'; El Maftoul (yellow card) 77'; Boukhriss (yellow card) 88'; Ferras (yellow card) 90+11'	Stadium: Ibn Batouta Stadium; Referee: Adil Zourak

20 June 2023 29	SCC Mohammédia	1–2	IR Tanger	Mohammédia
20:00 UTC+1	Ennakouss (yellow card) 26'; Boucheta 68' (pen.)	Report	Bahaj 9' (o.g.); Faouzi 45+3'	Stadium: Stade El Bachir; Referee: Nabil Benrqya

23 June 2023 30	IR Tanger	2–3	AS FAR	Tanger
20:00 UTC+1	El Moudane 14' (pen.) (yellow card) 32'; Aarab (yellow card) 27'; Benlamachi (yellow card) 62'; Moutouali 75'; Rabja (yellow card) 89'	Report	Slim 8' (pen.), 90+3' (pen.); Hamoudan 48'; Naji (yellow card) 62'; Ennafati (yellow card) 85'	Stadium: Ibn Batouta Stadium; Referee: Hicham Temsamani

==== Results overview ====
Locations of the 2022–23 Botola teams

Win Draw Loss

Region	Team	Home score	Away score	Aggregate score
Casablanca-Settat	DH Jadida	1–0	2–1	2–2
Casablanca-Settat	JS Soualem	0–1	2–0	0–3
Casablanca-Settat	Raja CA	0–0	3–0	0–3
Casablanca-Settat	SCC Mohammédia	0–1	1–2	2–2
Casablanca-Settat	Wydad AC	0–0	3–0	0–3
Rabat-Salé-Kénitra	AS FAR	2–3	4–0	2–7
Rabat-Salé-Kénitra	Fath US	1–0	1–0	1–1
Rabat-Salé-Kénitra	US Touarga	0–1	2–2	2–3
Oriental	MC Oujda	0–2	0–0	0–2
Oriental	RS Berkane	2–1	2–1	3–3
Tanger-Tetouan-Al Hoceima	MA Tétouan	2–0	1–0	2–1
Béni Mellal-Khénifra	OC Khouribga	3–0	1–1	4–1
Fès-Meknès	Maghreb AS	2–3	0–1	3–3
Marrakech-Safi	OC Safi	2–1	1–0	2–2
Souss-Massa	HUS Agadir	0–2	1–0	0–3

=== Throne Cup ===
10 February 2023 Round of 32	Maghreb AS	0–2	IR Tanger	Fez
17:00 UTC+1		Report	Zraibi 22'; Amian 78'; Souboul (yellow card) 85'; Rabja (yellow card) 89'	Stadium: Fez Stadium

12 April 2023 Round of 16	IR Tanger	1–1 (a.e.t.) (1–3 p)	Wydad AC	Tangier
22:00 UTC	El Moudane 5' (yellow card) 29'; Benlamachi (yellow card) 19'; Kiani (yellow card) 43'; Et-tair (coach) (yellow card) 59'; Souboul (yellow card) 76'; Moutouali (yellow card) 90+1'; Rabja (yellow card) 101'	Report	Jabrane (yellow card) 34'; Benayada (yellow card) 81'; Aboulfath (yellow card) 87'; Bouhra (yellow card) 90+9'; Ahadad (bench) (yellow card) 90+10' (red card) 90+10'; El Hassouni 90+13' (pen.) (yellow card) 96'; Sambou (yellow card) 101'; Garrido (coach) (yellow card) 112'	Stadium: Ibn Batouta Stadium; Referee: Daki Reddad
	Penalties
	Rabja (penalty scored); Chentouf (penalty missed); Souboul (penalty missed); El Ouassli (penalty missed)		Jabrane (penalty scored); El Amloud (penalty scored); Aboulfath (penalty scored)
Note: The match, originally scheduled for March 27, 2023, was postponed due to the participation of six Wydad players with their national teams in FIFA Week.

== Statistics ==
=== Squad appearances and goals ===
Last updated on 23 June 2023.

No.	Pos	Nat	Player	Total		Botola		Throne Cup	
No.	Pos	Nat	Player	Apps	Goals	Apps	Goals	Apps	Goals
Goalkeepers
1	GK	(Algeria) ALG	Gaya Merbah	16	-13	14	(-12)	2	(-1)
12	GK	(Morocco) MAR	Imad Askar	1	-4	1	(-4)	0	(0)
94	GK	(Morocco) MAR	Badreddine Benachour	8	-11	8	(-11)	0	(0)
99	GK	(Morocco) MAR	Zouhair Laaroubi	1	-2	1	(-2)	0	(0)
Defenders
2	DF	(Morocco) MAR	Ismail Laghzali	9	0	8+1	0	0	0
3	DF	(Morocco) MAR	Hatim El Ouahabi	7	0	7	0	0	0
4	DF	(Morocco) MAR	Ismail El Alami	4	0	1+3	0	0	0
13	DF	(Morocco) MAR	Oussama Al Aiz	3	0	0+3	0	0	0
15	DF	(Morocco) MAR	Ayoub Jarfi	12	0	11+1	0	0	0
20	DF	(Morocco) MAR	Mouhcine Rabja	15	2	13	2	2	0
21	DF	(Morocco) MAR	Mohamed Souboul	23	0	21	0	2	0
22	DF	(Morocco) MAR	Zakaria Kiani	24	1	19+3	1	2	0
24	DF	(Morocco) MAR	Saber Yazidi	1	0	0+1	0	0	0
27	DF	(Morocco) MAR	Ayoub El Rahmmaouy	15	0	10+4	0	0+1	0
28	DF	(Morocco) MAR	Abdelatif Noussir	5	0	5	0	0	0
92	DF	(Senegal) SEN	El Hadji Youssoupha Konaté	17	3	15	3	2	0
Midfielders
5	MF	(Morocco) MAR	Mohsine Moutouali	17	3	15	3	2	0
6	MF	(Morocco) MAR	Nouaman Aarab	29	0	27	0	1+1	0
8	MF	(Morocco) MAR	Abdelmottalib Faouzi	20	3	16+3	3	0+1	0
10	MF	(Algeria) ALG	Abdellah El Moudene	3	0	1+2	0	0	0
14	MF	(Morocco) MAR	Mohamed Said Bouksyr	26	0	13+11	0	1+1	0
16	MF	(Morocco) MAR	Mahmoud El Kayssoumi	6	0	3+3	0	0	0
23	MF	(Morocco) MAR	Ahmed Chentouf	11	0	0+10	0	0+1	0
26	MF	(Morocco) MAR	Salah Cheffani	1	0	1	0	0	0
29	MF	(Morocco) MAR	Ahmed Harboul	0	0	0	0	0	0
31	MF	(Morocco) MAR	Youssef Benali	19	0	9+9	0	0+1	0
42	MF	(Morocco) MAR	Sofian El Moudane	16	6	14	5	2	1
61	MF	(Morocco) MAR	Badreddine Bakkali	4	0	0+4	0	0	0
66	MF	(Morocco) MAR	Yassin Dihaz	2	0	0+2	0	0	0
70	MF	(Morocco) MAR	Hamza Hassani	12	0	4+8	0	0	0
Forwards
7	FW	(Morocco) MAR	Hassan Zraibi	24	2	20+2	1	1+1	1
9	FW	(Morocco) MAR	Mouad Ajandouz	0	0	0	0	0	0
11	FW	(Morocco) MAR	Abdellatif Akhrif	17	1	10+7	1	0	0
17	FW	(Ivory Coast) CIV	Joé Amian	27	2	17+8	1	1+1	1
19	FW	(Morocco) MAR	Jawad Ghabra	0	0	0	0	0	0
30	FW	(Morocco) MAR	Ali El Harrak	9	0	2+5	0	0+2	0
33	FW	(Morocco) MAR	Bilal El Hankouri	0	0	0	0	0	0
34	FW	(Morocco) MAR	Sabir Achefay	3	0	0+2	0	1	0
45	FW	(Gabon) GAB	Abdou Atchabao	13	0	6+6	0	1	0
55	FW	(Morocco) MAR	Zakaria Benlamachi	12	1	9+2	1	1	0
93	FW	(Morocco) MAR	Zouhair El Ouassli	15	1	12+1	1	1+1	0
Players who have made an appearance or had a squad number this season but have left the club
1	GK	(Morocco) MAR	Aissa Sioudi	7	-10	6+1	(-10)	0	(0)
25	FW	(Senegal) SEN	Ngagne Fall	8	0	4+4	0	0	0
5	DF	(Morocco) MAR	Adnan Souiss	4	0	4	0	0	0
77	FW	(Morocco) MAR	Abdelali Asri	11	0	0+11	0	0	0
18	MF	(Togo) TOG	Donou Hubert	5	0	2+3	0	0	0

- = ineligible players

=== Goalscorers ===
Rank	No.	Pos	Nat	Name	Botola	Throne Cup	Total
1	42	MF	(Morocco)	Sofian El Moudane	5	1	6
2	92	DF	(Senegal)	El Hadji Youssoupha Konaté	3	0	3
2	8	MF	(Morocco)	Abdelmottalib Faouzi	3	0	3
2	5	MF	(Morocco)	Mohsine Moutouali	3	0	3
5	20	DF	(Morocco)	Mouhcine Rabja	2	0	2
5	7	FW	(Morocco)	Hassan Zraibi	1	1	2
5	17	FW	(Ivory Coast)	Joé Amian	1	1	2
8	11	FW	(Morocco)	Abdellatif Akhrif	1	0	1
8	22	DF	(Morocco)	Zakaria Kiani	1	0	1
8	93	FW	(Morocco)	Zouhair El Ouassli	1	0	1
8	55	FW	(Morocco)	Zakaria Benlamachi	1	0	1
Own goals					1	0	1
TOTAL					23	3	26

=== Assists ===
Rank	No.	Pos	Nat	Name	Botola	Throne Cup	Total
1	5	MF	(Morocco)	Mohsine Moutouali	3	1	4
2	42	MF	(Morocco)	Sofian El Moudane	3	0	3
3	2	DF	(Morocco)	Ismail Laghzali	1	0	1
3	14	MF	(Morocco)	Mohamed Said Bouksyr	1	0	1
3	6	MF	(Morocco)	Nouaman Aarab	1	0	1
3	21	DF	(Morocco)	Mohamed Souboul	1	0	1
3	22	DF	(Morocco)	Zakaria Kiani	1	0	1
3	92	DF	(Senegal)	El Hadji Youssoupha Konaté	1	0	1
3	34	FW	(Morocco)	Sabir Achefay	0	1	1
TOTAL					12	2	14

=== Hat-tricks ===
Player	Against	Result	Date	Competition

(H) – Home; (A) – Away

=== Clean sheets ===
Last updated on 23 June 2023.

No	Name	Botola	Coupe du Trône	Total
1	(Algeria) Merbah	7/14	1/2	8/16
12	(Morocco) Askar	0/1	0/0	0/1
94	(Morocco) Benachour	2/8	0/0	2/8
99	(Morocco) Laaroubi	0/1	0/0	0/1
~~1~~	(Morocco) Sioudi	0/7	0/0	0/7
Total		8/30	1/2	9/32

=== Disciplinary record ===
N	P	Nat.	Name	Botola			Coupe du Trône			Total			Notes
N	P	Nat.	Name	Yellow card	Second yellow card	Red card	Yellow card	Second yellow card	Red card	Yellow card	Second yellow card	Red card	Notes
1	GK	(Algeria)	Gaya Merbah	1						1			
2	DF	(Morocco)	Ismail Laghzali	1						1			
4	DF	(Morocco)	Ismail El Alami	1		1				1		1	
5	MF	(Morocco)	Mohsine Moutouali	3			1			4			
6	MF	(Morocco)	Nouaman Aarab	8		1				8		1	
7	FW	(Morocco)	Hassan Zraibi	1						1			
8	MF	(Morocco)	Abdelmottalib Faouzi	2		1				2		1	
11	FW	(Morocco)	Abdellatif Akhrif	2						2			
14	MF	(Morocco)	Mohamed Said Bouksyr	3						3			
15	DF	(Morocco)	Ayoub Jarfi	1						1			
16	MF	(Morocco)	Mahmoud El Kayssoumi	1						1			
17	FW	(Ivory Coast)	Djama Joé Amian			2						2	
20	DF	(Morocco)	Mouhcine Rabja	3			2			5			
21	DF	(Morocco)	Mohamed Souboul	2			2			4			
22	DF	(Morocco)	Zakaria Kiani	5			1			6			
27	DF	(Morocco)	Ayoub El Rahmmaouy			1						1	
31	FW	(Morocco)	Youssef Benali	6						6			
34	FW	(Morocco)	Sabir Achefay	1						1			
42	MF	(Morocco)	Sofian El Moudane	4			1			5			
55	FW	(Morocco)	Zakaria Benlamachi	5	1		1			6	1		
92	DF	(Senegal)	El Hadji Youssoupha Konaté	2						2			
93	FW	(Morocco)	Zouhair El Ouassli	2		1				2		1	
94	GK	(Morocco)	Badreddine Benachour	2						2			
99	GK	(Morocco)	Zouhair Laaroubi	1						1			
—		(Morocco)	Hilal Et-tair (coach)	3			1			4			
~~18~~	MF	(Togo)	Donou Hubert	3		1				3		1	

Last updated: 23 June 2023
Source: goalzz.com
Only competitive matches
(yellow card) = Number of bookings; (second yellow card) = Number of sending offs after a second yellow card; (red card) = Number of sending offs by a direct red card.

=== Injury record ===
N	P	Nat.	Name	Type	Status	Source	Match	Inj. Date	Ret. Date
9	FW	(Morocco)	Mouad Ajandouz	Left thigh injury			in training	21 August 2022	Unknown
4	DF	(Morocco)	Ismail El Alami	Bruise at the bottom of the ankle			in training	22 August 2022	1 October 2022
19	FW	(Morocco)	Jawad Ghabra	Right knee injury (Cruciate ligament surgery)			vs Fath US	24 August 2022	Unknown
13	DF	(Morocco)	Oussama Al Aiz	Moderate injury to the fibula			in training	30 August 2022	28 January 2023
10	MF	(Algeria)	Abdellah El Moudene	Rear thigh muscle injury			in training	8 September 2022	19 October 2022
70	MF	(Morocco)	Hamza Hassani Boouia	Knee ligament sprain			in training	13 September 2022	28 October 2022
31	FW	(Morocco)	Youssef Benali	Minor bruise on the ankle			vs MA Tétouan	9 September 2022	17 September 2022
21	DF	(Morocco)	Mohamed Souboul	Knee sprain			in training	15 September 2022	6 January 2023
31	FW	(Morocco)	Youssef Benali				vs HUS Agadir	17 September 2022	November 2022
5	DF	(Morocco)	Adnan Souiss				vs HUS Agadir	17 September 2022	30 October 2022
3	DF	(Morocco)	Hatim El Ouahabi				vs OC Safi	1 October 2022	27 December 2022
28	DF	(Morocco)	Abdelatif Noussir	Thigh muscle tear			in training	15 October 2022	28 October 2022
15	DF	(Morocco)	Ayoub Jarfi				vs Fath Us	16 October 2022	27 December 2022
12	GK	(Morocco)	Imad Askar	Simple lower back bruise			in training	30 October 2022	27 December 2022

- Player is injured
- Player has recovered from injury
Last updated: 28 January 2023
Source: clubirt kooora.com

== See also ==
- 2015–16 IR Tanger season
- 2016–17 IR Tanger season
- 2017–18 IR Tanger season
- 2018–19 IR Tanger season
- 2019–20 IR Tanger season
- 2020–21 IR Tanger season
- 2021–22 IR Tanger season
