= 2023–24 Botola Pro =

Moroccan football league season

Botola Inwi
- Season: 2023–24
- Dates: 25 August 2023 – 14 June 2024
- Champions: Raja CA (13th title)
- Relegated: CAY Berrechid; MC Oujda
- Champions League: Raja CA; AS FAR
- Confederation Cup: RS Berkane; US Touarga
- Matches: 240
- Goals: 534 (2.23 per match)
- Top goalscorer: Yousri Bouzok (14 goals)
- Biggest home win: Raja CA 6–1 IR Tanger (28 December 2023)
- Biggest away win: CAY Berrechid 0–5 Fath US (28 May 2024)
- Longest winning run: Raja CA; AS FAR (9 Matches)
- Longest unbeaten run: Raja CA (30 Matches)
- Longest winless run: MC Oujda (14 Matches)
- Longest losing run: JS Soualem (5 Matches)
- All statistics correct as of 14 June 2024.

The 2023–24 Botola Pro, also known as Botola Pro Inwi for sponsorship reasons, is the 67th season of the Premier League and the 13th under its current format of Moroccan Pro League, the top Moroccan professional league for association football clubs, since its establishment in 1956. AS FAR came into the season as defending champions of the 2022–23 season. RCA Zemamra and Youssoufia Berrechid entered as the two promoted teams from the 2022–23 Botola 2.

On 14 June 2024, Raja CA won the last match 0–3 against MC Oujda and secured their thirteenth Botola title. They won their last 9 league games, finishing on 72 points without a single defeat, both all-time records.

== Number of teams by regions ==
	Regions of Morocco	Number of teams	Teams
1	Casablanca-Settat	6	CAY Berrechid, JS Soualem, Raja CA, RCA Zemamra, SCC Mohammédia and Wydad AC
2	Rabat-Salé-Kénitra	3	AS FAR, FUS Rabat and US Touarga
3	Oriental	2	MC Oujda and RS Berkane
3	Tanger-Tetouan-Al Hoceima	2	IR Tanger and MA Tétouan
5	Fès-Meknès	1	MAS Fès
5	Marrakesh–Safi	1	OC Safi
5	Souss-Massa	1	HUS Agadir

== Personnel and kits ==
Teams	Managers	Captain	Kit manufacturer	Shirt sponsor
AS FAR	(Tunisia) Nasreddine Nabi	(Morocco) Mohamed Rabie Hrimat	(Germany) Uhlsport	
CAY Berrechid	(Morocco) Abderrahim Nejjar	(Morocco) Achraf Hilali	(Morocco) Bang Sports	OULD BOUAZZA, KA PREFA, Alitkane
FUS Rabat	(Morocco) Jamal Sellami	(Morocco) El Mehdi El Bassil	(Germany) Uhlsport	Novec, LafargeHolcim Maroc^{1}
HUS Agadir	(Morocco) Abdelhadi Sektioui	(Morocco) Hicham El Majhad	(Morocco) Bang Sports	Afriquia, Skoda^{1}, Joly^{3}
IR Tanger	(Morocco) Hilal Et-tair	(Morocco) Reda Jaadi	(Morocco) Gloria Sport	Tanger-Med
JS Soualem	(Morocco) Mahmoud Sebky	(Morocco) Amine El Msane	(Morocco) Mexxess	MARSBET, Asta, Crunchips^{1}
Maghreb AS	(Tunisia) Abdelhay Ben Soltane	(Morocco) Achraf Harmach	(Italy) Kappa	TGCC, Asta^{1}
MA Tétouan	(Morocco) Abdellatif Jrindou	(Morocco) Zaid Krouch	(Morocco) AB Sport	Tanger-Med, Cafés Carrion^{1}, Municipality of Tetouan^{2}
MC Oujda	(Morocco) Faouzi Jamal	(Morocco) Yassir Jarici	(Morocco) Bang Sports	Dari^{1}
OC Safi	(Morocco) Adil Serraj (interim)	(Morocco) Mohamed El Mourabit	(Morocco) Bang Sports	Fitco, ocstore.ma^{1}
Raja CA	(Germany) Josef Zinnbauer	(Morocco) Anas Zniti	(England) Umbro	1xBet, Sofac^{3}, Nor'Dar, Marsa Maroc^{1}, Atlanta Sanad^{2}^{3}
RCA Zemamra	(Morocco) Mohamed Amine Benhachem	(Morocco) Abdelkhalek Ahmidouch	(Morocco) Bang Sports	IGASER
RS Berkane	(Tunisia) Mouin Chaâbani	(Burkina Faso) Issoufou Dayo	(Morocco) Bang Sports	Thé Dahmiss, GoldVision^{1}, National Gaz^{1}
SCC Mohammédia	(Morocco) Noureddine Ziyati	(Morocco) Abdelhak Assal	(Morocco) Chabab	Vittel^{2}
US Touarga	(Morocco) Abdelouahed Zamrat	(Morocco) Achraf Harmach	(Italy) Macron	
Wydad AC	(Morocco) Aziz Ben Askar	(Morocco) Yahya Jabrane	(Italy) Macron	Ingelec, Boule d'Or^{1}, Sama Immobilier^{1}, Alitkane^{2}

1. On the back of shirt.
2. On the sleeves.
3. On the shorts.
Additionally, referee kits are made by Puma.

== Managerial changes ==
Teams	Outgoing manager	Manner of departure	Date of vacancy	Incoming manager	Date of appointment
RCA Zemamra	(Morocco) Abderrahim Chkilit	Resigned	15 June 2023	(Morocco) Abdelaziz Kerkache	18 July 2023
Raja CA	(Morocco) Hicham Aboucherouane (interim)	End of tenure as caretake	30 June 2023	(Germany) Josef Zinnbauer	1 July 2023
AS FAR	(Morocco) Mohamed Samadi	End of contract	30 June 2023	(Tunisia) Nasreddine Nabi	18 July 2023
Wydad AC	(Belgium) Sven Vandenbroeck	End of contract	30 June 2023	(Morocco) Adil Ramzi	22 July 2023
MAS Fez	(Morocco) Omar Hassi	End of contract	30 June 2023	(Morocco) Tarik Sektioui	25 July 2023
MA Tetouan	(Morocco) Hicham Louissi	End of contract	30 June 2023	(Morocco) Mohamed Alaoui Ismaili	26 July 2023
OC Safi	(Egypt) Tarek Mostafa	End of contract	30 July 2023	(Sweden) Mounir Chebil	30 July 2023
US Touarga	(Morocco) Tarik Sektioui	Mutual consent	23 July 2023	(Morocco) Abdelouahed Zamrat	27 July 2023
MC Oujda	(Morocco) Omar Najhi	Contract termination	14 August 2023	(Morocco) Faouzi Jamal	15 August 2023
IR Tanger	(Morocco) Hilal Et-tair	Contract termination	15 September 2023	(Morocco) Omar Najhi	15 September 2023
Youssoufia Berrechid	(Morocco) Mohamed Guisser	Sacked	5 October 2023	(Morocco) Abdelatif Laftouh (interim)	28 December 2023
RCA Zemamra	(Morocco) Abdelaziz Kerkache	Contract termination	9 October 2023	(Morocco) Mohamed Amine Benhachem	12 October 2023
OC Safi	(Sweden) Mounir Chebil	Contract termination	17 October 2023	(Morocco) Zakaria Aboub	18 October 2023
JS Soualem	(Morocco) Bouchaib El Moubarki	Mutual consent	30 November 2023	(Morocco) Mohammed Benchrifa	30 November 2023
Wydad AC	(Morocco) Adil Ramzi	Mutual consent	15 December 2023	(Tunisia) Faouzi Benzarti	15 December 2023
IR Tanger	(Morocco) Omar Najhi	Contract termination	11 January 2024	(Morocco) Hilal Et-tair	12 January 2024
Youssoufia Berrechid	(Morocco) Abdelatif Laftouh (interim)	End of tenure as caretake	22 January 2024	(Morocco) Abderrahim Nejjar	22 January 2024
MA Tetouan	(Morocco) Mohamed Alaoui Ismaili	Sacked	7 February 2024	(Morocco) Abdellatif Jrindou	11 February 2024
RS Berkane	(Morocco) Amine El Karma	Mutual consent	11 February 2024	(Tunisia) Mouin Chaâbani	13 February 2024
SCC Mohammédia	(Morocco) Rachid Rokki	Sacked	14 February 2024	(Morocco) Noureddine Ziyati	13 February 2024
MAS Fez	(Morocco) Tarik Sektioui	End of contract	4 March 2024	(Tunisia) Abdelhay Ben Soltane	4 March 2024
JS Soualem	(Morocco) Mohammed Benchrifa	Mutual consent	4 March 2024	(Morocco) Mahmoud Sebky	4 March 2024
Wydad AC	(Tunisia) Faouzi Benzarti	Mutual consent	14 March 2024	(Morocco) Aziz Ben Askar	5 April 2024
OC Safi	(Morocco) Zakaria Aboub	Contract termination	28 May 2024	(Morocco) Adil Serraj (interim)	28 Mary 2024

== Foreign players ==
All teams are allowed to register up to five foreign players, but can only use up to three players on the field at the same time.

Players name in bold indicates the player is registered during the mid-season transfer window.

Club	Player 1	Player 2	Player 3	Player 4	Player 5	Unregistered Players	Former Players
AS FAR	(Republic of the Congo) Messie Biatoumoussoka	(Ivory Coast) Lamine Diakite	(Ghana) Bernard Morrison	(Rwanda) Emmanuel Imanishimwe	(Togo) Ismaïl Ouro-Agoro		
CAY Berrechid	(Senegal) Mélo Ndiaye	(Senegal) Mouhamed Johnson					
Fath US	(Ivory Coast) Oumar Farouk Comara	(Ivory Coast) Presnel Arnaud Banga	(Cameroon) Herman Junior Kameni	(Jordan) Hadi Al-Hourani	(Nigeria) James Ajako		(Ivory Coast) Hervé Guy
HUS Agadir	(Ivory Coast) Djama Joé Amian	(Democratic Republic of the Congo) Junior Mbele	(Democratic Republic of the Congo) Katulondi Kati	(Senegal) Assane Bèye	(Tunisia) Fedi Ben Choug		
IR Tanger	(Algeria) Gaya Merbah	(Algeria) Walid Bencherifa	(Spain) Alexis Sánchez Pérez	(Senegal) El Hadji Madické Kane	(Senegal) El Hadji Youssoupha Konaté		
JS Soualem	(The Gambia) Pa Modou Sohna	(Senegal) Baye Dame Dieng	(Senegal) Ibrahima Guèye				
Maghreb AS	(Ivory Coast) Banfa Sylla	(Ivory Coast) Semelo Gueï	(Democratic Republic of the Congo) Christian Nsundi	(Togo) Justin Yeré	(Togo) Kangnivi Ama Tchoutchoui	(Nigeria) Egah Saviour	
MA Tétouan	(Algeria) Mohamed Amine Ezzemani	(The Gambia) Sheikh Omar Faye	(Mali) Ismaïla Simpara	(Senegal) Mamadou Seck	(Senegal) Pape Badji		
MC Oujda							
OC Safi	(Algeria) Houari Ferhani	(Guinea) Boniface Haba	(Mali) Abdoulaye Diarra	(Mali) Cheickne Samaké	(Nigeria) Ndifreke Udo		
Raja CA	(Algeria) **Riad Benayad**	(Algeria) Yousri Bouzok	(Bolivia) **Víctor Ábrego**	(Ivory Coast) **Hervé Guy**	(South Africa) Haashim Domingo	(Guinea) Ahmadou Camara	(Iraq) Aymen Hussein (Togo) Roger Aholou
RCA Zemamra	(Cameroon) Emmanuel Obounou	(Senegal) Baïdy Diallo	(Senegal) Oumar Goudiaby				
RS Berkane	(Burkina Faso) Djibril Ouattara	(Burkina Faso) Issoufou Dayo	(Democratic Republic of the Congo) Tuisila Kisinda	(Senegal) Mamadou Lamine Camara	(Senegal) Paul Valère Bassène	(Ivory Coast) Claude Gnolou (Democratic Republic of the Congo) Chadrack Lukombe (Mauritania) Adama Ba	
SCC Mohammédia	(Guinea) Tidiane Doumbouya	(Mali) Issouf Traoré					
US Touarga	(Chad) Eric Mbangossoum	(Cameroon) Martial Zemba Ikoung	(Portugal) Tiago Lopes	(Senegal) Papa Amady Gadio	(Senegal) Simon Diedhiou		
Wydad AC	(Algeria) Ilyes Chetti	(Algeria) Zakaria Draoui	(Democratic Republic of the Congo) Arsène Zola	(Libya) Hamdou Elhouni	(Senegal) Bouly Sambou		

== League table ==
Pos	Team	Pld	W	D	L	GF	GA	GD	Pts	Qualification or relegation
1	Raja CA (C, Q)	30	21	9	0	52	15	+37	72	Qualification for Champions League
2	AS FAR (Q)	30	22	5	3	65	22	+43	71	Qualification for Champions League
3	RS Berkane (Q)	30	14	10	6	38	23	+15	52	Qualification for Confederation Cup
4	Union de Touarga (Q)	30	12	8	10	36	33	+3	44 (Note: Union de Touarga finished ahead of Olympic Safi and Wydad AC on head-to-head points: Union de Touarga 7, Olympic Safi 6, Wydad AC 4)	Qualification for Confederation Cup
5	Olympic Safi	30	11	11	8	29	26	+3	44	
6	Wydad AC	30	12	8	10	31	27	+4	44	
7	FUS Rabat	30	11	10	9	32	28	+4	43	
8	RCA Zemamra	30	11	7	12	35	35	0	40	
9	MA Tétouan	30	7	14	9	27	28	−1	35 (Note: Moghreb Tétouan finished ahead of Hassania Agadir on head-to-head points: Hassania Agadir 0–2 Moghreb Tétouan, Moghreb Tétouan 1–1 Hassania Agadir)	
10	Hassania Agadir	30	8	11	11	35	43	−8	35	
11	MAS Fès	30	8	10	12	34	35	−1	34	
12	IR Tanger	30	7	12	11	29	38	−9	33	
13	JS Soualem	30	8	6	16	31	46	−15	30	
14	SCC Mohammédia	30	6	7	17	19	40	−21	25 (Note: SCC Mohammédia finished ahead of Mouloudia Oujda on head-to-head points: SCC Mohammédia 1–0 Mouloudia Oujda, Mouloudia Oujda 0–0 SCC Mohammédia)	
15	MC Oujda (R)	30	5	10	15	20	46	−26	25	Relegation to Botola 2
16	Youssoufia Berrechid (R)	30	4	8	18	21	49	−28	20	Relegation to Botola 2

Source: FRMF.ma
Rules for classification: 1) Points; 2a) Head-to-head goal difference if they are two teams with equal points; 2b) Goal difference if they are more than two teams with equal points; 3) Number of wins; 4) Goals scored; 5) Play-off between involved teams.
(C) Champions; (Q) Qualified for the phase indicated; (R) Relegated

== Results ==
Home \ Away	ASFAR	CAYB	FUS	HUSA	IRT	JSS	MAS	MAT	MCO	OCS	RCA	RCAZ	RSB	SCCM	UTS	WAC
AS FAR	—	4–1	2–0	2–1	1–0	3–1	3–1	3–0	5–0	1–0	1–1	3–1	0–0	2–0	3–0	3–1
CAY Berrechid	0–2	—	0–5	1–2	0–1	2–3	1–0	0–0	0–0	0–1	1–3	1–0	0–0	0–1	2–0	0–0
FUS Rabat	1–4	1–1	—	2–0	0–0	1–0	0–0	1–1	0–0	0–0	0–1	0–2	1–1	1–0	1–1	2–1
HUS Agadir	2–1	4–1	1–3	—	1–1	2–1	2–1	0–2	2–2	1–1	1–1	2–2	0–2	2–0	3–2	0–0
IR Tanger	1–2	2–1	2–1	0–1	—	0–2	2–2	1–1	1–1	0–0	1–2	1–1	0–1	0–0	2–1	0–3
JS Soualem	2–2	3–1	1–3	1–0	1–3	—	1–1	1–2	0–0	0–1	0–0	1–1	1–2	2–2	1–0	3–1
MAS Fès	1–3	0–1	1–2	2–2	2–1	3–0	—	2–1	1–0	0–1	1–1	2–3	0–0	2–1	0–1	1–1
MA Tétouan	2–2	0–0	2–1	1–1	1–1	4–0	0–2	—	1–1	0–0	1–1	0–1	0–0	1–0	1–1	0–0
MC Oujda	0–3	1–1	2–1	1–0	1–1	3–2	1–3	0–1	—	1–1	0–3	1–2	1–0	0–0	1–3	0–2
OC Safi	1–0	3–1	0–0	1–1	1–1	1–0	1–1	2–1	3–1	—	2–2	2–0	1–2	0–0	1–3	2–1
Raja CA	2–2	2–0	2–0	2–0	6–1	3–1	1–0	1–0	2–0	1–0	—	2–1	3–0	1–0	1–0	1–0
RCA Zemamra	0–1	1–0	1–2	3–0	0–1	1–0	1–1	1–1	0–1	3–2	1–2	—	2–1	0–0	1–2	0–0
RS Berkane	1–2	3–1	2–0	0–0	2–1	3–1	2–1	3–2	2–0	3–0	1–1	1–2	—	2–0	0–0	0–0
SCC Mohammédia	0–2	2–2	0–1	3–1	1–0	0–1	0–2	0–1	1–0	1–0	0–2	0–2	1–1	—	0–2	2–3
US Touarga	2–1	3–2	0–0	3–3	2–2	0–1	1–0	1–0	2–0	1–0	0–0	2–1	1–3	1–2	—	0–1
Wydad AC	0–1	1–0	0–2	1–0	0–2	1–0	1–1	1–0	3–1	0–1	0–2	3–1	1–0	5–2	0–0	—

Legend: Blue = home team win; Yellow = draw; Red = away team win.
For upcoming matches, an "a" indicates there is an article about the rivalry between the two participants.

=== Positions by round ===
The table lists the positions of teams after each week of matches.

Team ╲ Round	1	2	3	4	5	6	7	8	9	10	11	12	13	14	15	16	17	18	19	20	21	22	23	24	25	26	27	28	29	30
AS FAR	2	5	2	1	1	5	3	2	2	2	1	1	1	1	1	1	1	1	1	1	1	1	1	1	1	1	1	1	2	2
Youssoufia Berrechid	12	15	16	16	16	16	14	15	15	14	14	15	16	16	16	16	16	16	16	16	16	16	16	16	16	16	16	16	16	16
FUS Rabat	3	6	7	3	7	6	4	7	6	6	6	5	5	5	5	5	5	5	4	4	3	3	3	4	4	5	5	4	5	7
Hassania Agadir	8	11	14	14	14	14	15	14	14	16	16	16	15	13	13	13	12	11	12	14	12	12	12	11	11	12	10	10	10	10
IR Tanger	14	14	13	11	11	13	13	13	13	12	13	13	14	15	15	15	15	15	15	13	10	11	11	12	12	11	12	12	12	12
JS Soualem	4	3	3	8	10	12	12	12	12	13	12	12	13	14	14	14	14	14	14	15	15	15	13	14	13	13	13	13	13	13
MAS Fès	6	7	8	7	5	3	6	5	7	8	9	8	8	8	8	6	8	8	10	10	8	10	9	10	10	10	11	11	11	11
MA Tétouan	10	12	9	5	3	7	5	6	5	5	5	6	6	6	6	9	9	9	8	8	9	8	10	8	8	8	9	9	9	9
MC Oujda	15	16	15	15	15	15	16	16	16	15	15	14	12	11	12	11	10	10	11	12	14	14	15	15	15	15	15	15	14	15
OC Safi	9	10	10	9	8	9	9	9	9	10	7	7	7	7	7	8	7	7	6	6	6	6	6	6	7	6	6	6	6	5
Raja CA	1	4	6	4	6	4	7	4	4	4	2	2	2	2	2	2	2	2	2	2	2	2	2	2	2	2	2	2	1	1
RCA Zemamra	11	8	11	12	13	11	10	10	10	7	8	9	10	10	9	10	11	12	9	9	11	9	8	9	9	9	8	8	8	8
RS Berkane	5	2	1	2	2	1	2	3	3	3	4	4	4	3	3	3	3	3	5	5	5	5	4	3	3	3	3	3	3	3
SCC Mohammédia	13	13	12	13	12	10	11	11	11	11	11	11	11	12	11	12	13	13	13	11	13	13	14	13	14	14	14	14	15	14
Union de Touarga	7	1	4	10	9	8	8	8	8	9	10	10	9	9	10	7	6	6	7	7	7	7	7	7	6	7	7	7	4	4
Wydad AC	16	9	5	6	4	2	1	1	1	1	3	3	3	4	4	4	4	4	3	3	4	4	5	5	5	4	4	5	7	6

Leader and CAF Champions League
CAF Champions League
CAF Confederation Cup
Relegation to Botola 2

Updated to match(es) played on 14 June 2024. Source: the-sports.org

== Season statistics ==
=== Scoring ===
- First goal of the season:
  - (Morocco) Mouhcine Bouriga for Maghreb AS against MA Tétouan (25 August 2023)
- Last goal of the season:
  - (Morocco) Oussama Mahrous for Wydad AC against MA Tétouan (14 June 2024)

=== Top goalscorers ===
As of 2 June 2024

Rank	Player	Club	Goals
1	(Algeria) Yousri Bouzok	Raja CA	14
2	(Morocco) Ismail Khafi	IR Tanger	13
3	(Morocco) Mouhcine Bouriga	Maghreb AS	12
4	(Morocco) Sofian El Moudane	HUS Agadir	10
5	(Morocco) Mohamed Rabie Hrimat	AS FAR	9
5	(Morocco) Tawfik Bentayeb	US Touarga	9
5	(Morocco) Youssef El Fahli	RS Berkane	9
5	(Morocco) Amine Zouhzouh	AS FAR	9
5	(Senegal) Abdou Badji	MA Tétouan	9
5	(Morocco) Hamid Ahaddad	Fath US	9
5	(Morocco) Youness Nejjari	OC Safi	9

=== Hat-tricks ===
Player	For	Against	Result	Date	Round
(Morocco) Charki El Bahri	Wydad AC	IR Tanger	3–0 (A)	7 October 2023	6
(Algeria) Yousri Bouzok	Raja CA	IR Tanger	6–1 (H)	28 December 2023	13
(Morocco) Nawfel Zerhouni	Raja CA	IR Tanger	6–1 (H)	28 December 2023	13
(Morocco) Hamza Igamane	AS FAR	Fath US	4–1 (A)	8 January 2024	15
(Morocco) Amine Zouhzouh	AS FAR	US Touarga	3–0 (H)	25 February 2024	21

(H) – Home; (A) – Away
^{4} – Player scored four goals.

=== Goalkeepers' Goals-to-Games Ratio and Clean Sheets ===
As of 14 June 2024

Rank	Name	Club	Matches	Goals Against	Average	Clean Sheets
1	(Morocco) Anas Zniti	Raja CA	30	15	0.5	17
2	(Morocco) El Mehdi Benabid	AS FAR	27	21	0.77	11
3	(Morocco) Khalid Kbiri Alaoui	OC Safi	28	23	0.85	11
4	(Morocco) Yahia El Filali	MA Tétouan	29	25	0.86	10
5	(Morocco) Youssef El Motie	Wydad AC	27	27	1	11

=== Discipline ===
==== Player ====
- Most yellow cards: 9
  - (Morocco) Amine Souane (MC Oujda)
  - (Morocco) Habib Allah Dahmani (MC Oujda)
- Most red cards: 3
  - (Morocco) Amine Aboulfath (Wydad AC)
  - (Senegal) Papa Amady Gadio (US Touarga)

==== Club ====
- Most yellow cards: 68
  - OC Safi
- Most red cards: 8
  - Wydad AC
- Fewest yellow cards: 38
  - MA Tétouan
- Fewest red cards: 1
  - IR Tanger

== See also ==
- 2023–24 CAF Champions League
- 2023–24 CAF Confederation Cup
- 2023 African Football League
- 2023 CAF Women's Champions League
- 2023 Arab Club Champions Cup
- 2022–23 Moroccan Throne Cup
