= Papa Amady Gadio =

Senegalese footballer

Personal information
- Date of birth: 19 October 2001 (age 25)
- Place of birth: Rufisque, Senegal
- Height: 1.85 m (6 ft 1 in)
- Position: Central midfielder

Team information
- Current team: Novi Pazar
- Number: 6

Senior career*
Years	Team	Apps	(Gls)
2023	Génération Foot		
2023–2025	UTS Rabat	41	(1)
2025–	Akhmat Grozny	11	(0)
2026–	→ Novi Pazar (loan)	2	(0)
- * Club domestic league appearances and goals as of 10 August 2026

Papa Amady Gadio (born 19 October 2001) is a Senegalese football player who plays as a central midfielder for Serbian Superliga club Novi Pazar on loan from Akhmat Grozny.

== Career ==
On 11 September 2025, Gadio signed with Russian Premier League club Akhmat Grozny. He made his RPL debut for Akhmat on 2 November 2025 in a game against Baltika Kaliningrad.

== Career statistics ==
As of 17 May 2026

Club	Season	League			Cup		Continental		Other		Total	
Club	Season	Division	Apps	Goals	Apps	Goals	Apps	Goals	Apps	Goals	Apps	Goals
Génération Foot	2023–24	Ligue 1 (Senegal)	–		–		2 (Note: Appearances in CAF Champions League)	0	–		2	0
UTS Rabat	2023–24	Botola Pro	16	0	0	0	–		–		16	0
UTS Rabat	2024–25	Botola Pro	25	1	3	1	0	0	6 (Note: Appearances in Moroccan Excellence Cup)	0	34	2
UTS Rabat	Total		41	1	3	1	0	0	6	0	50	2
Akhmat Grozny	2025–26	Russian Premier League	11	0	2	0	–		–		13	0
Career total			52	1	5	1	2	0	6	0	65	2
