= Hicham Dmiai =

Moroccan footballer

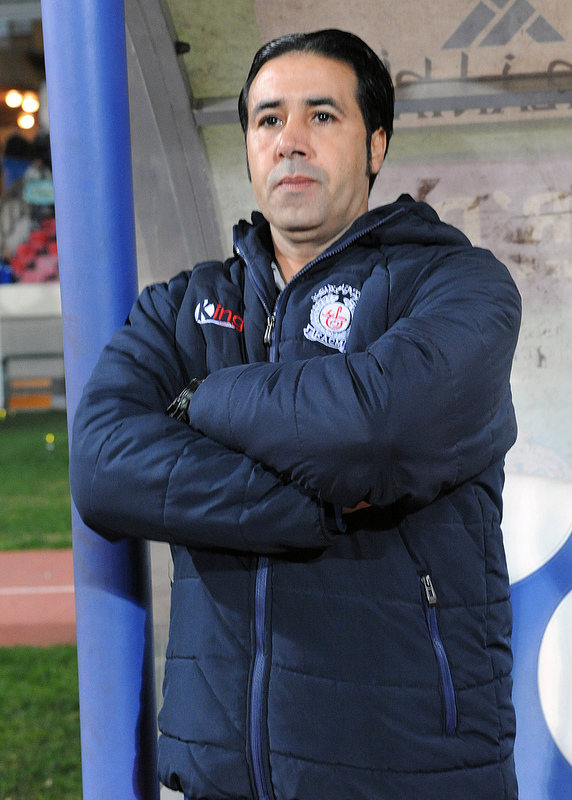

Personal information
- Date of birth: 11 January 1971 (age 55)
- Place of birth: Marrakesh, Morocco
- Position: Midfielder

International career
Years	Team	Apps	(Gls)
1991–1996	Morocco	5	(0)

Hicham Dmiai (Arabic: هشام الدميعي; born 11 January 1971) is a Moroccan former footballer and handball player . He competed in the 1992 Summer Olympics. He was a key player in his football club KACM KAC Marrakech.
