= Mohamed Souboul =

Moroccan footballer (born 2001)

Personal information
- Date of birth: 17 November 2001 (age 24)
- Place of birth: Casablanca, Morocco
- Height: 1.75 m (5 ft 9 in)
- Position: Left-back

Youth career
- 2012–2020: Raja CA

Senior career*
Years	Team	Apps	(Gls)
2020–2024	Raja CA	19	(0)
2022–2023	→ Ittihad Tanger (loan)	21	(0)
2024	Bastia	4	(0)
2024–2025	Ajman	14	(0)

International career^{‡}
2020–2021	Morocco U20	6	(0)
2022–	Morocco U23	1	(0)
- * Club domestic league appearances and goals as of 15 June 2024 ‡ National team caps and goals as of 10 October 2023

Mohamed Souboul (Arabic: محمد سوبول; born 17 November 2001) is a Moroccan professional footballer who plays as a left-back.

== Early life ==
Mohamed Souboul was born on 17 November 2001 in Casablanca. At a young age, he began to play football in the neighborhood amateur teams before joining Raja Club Athletic's youth system in the Oasis complex.

== Club career ==
On 7 March 2021, he made his professional debut against Youssoufia Berrechid (1–1 draw). A month later, on 7 April, he made his starting debut against Hassania Agadir (1–0 loss). He ended the 2020–21 season as vice-champion of Morocco.

On 5 September 2022, Souboul joined Ittihad Tanger on a season-long loan. On 9 September 2022, he played his first match against Moghreb Tetouan under Hicham Dmiai (1–0 loss).

== International career ==
On 7 October 2020, he received his first call-up to the Morocco U20 team for a double friendly against Mauritania U20 at the Mohammed VI Complex in Salé. In October 2021, Souboul was called up by Hicham Dmiai to the Moroccan U23 squad for a training camp between 4 and 12 October.

On 28 July 2022, he flew to Turkey with the team to take part in the 2021 Islamic Solidarity Games.

On 21 December 2022, he was called up by Hussein Ammouta to the National A' team for a friendly match against Senegal A', as part of the preparations for the 2022 African Nations Championship organised in Algeria.

== Honours ==
Raja CA

- CAF Confederation Cup: 2020–21
- Arab Club Champions Cup: 2019–20
- Botola runner-up: 2020–21, 2021–22
- CAF Super Cup runner-up: 2021
