= Ismail Khafi =

Moroccan footballer (born 1995)

Personal information
- Date of birth: 19 September 1995 (age 31)
- Place of birth: Casablanca, Morocco
- Height: 1.83 m (6 ft 0 in)
- Position: Forward

Team information
- Current team: Raja CA
- Number: 9

Senior career*
Years	Team	Apps	(Gls)
2016–2018	TAS Casablanca		
2018–2019	Ittihad Khemisset	40	(18)
2019–2021	MC Oujda	33	(13)
2021–2023	AS FAR	31	(9)
2023	Al-Sailiya	12	(2)
2023–2024	IR Tanger	28	(13)
2024–2025	Qadsia SC	22	(9)
2025–	Raja CA	28	(5)

International career^{‡}
2020	Morocco	2	(0)
Medal record
Men's football
Representing Morocco
African Nations Championship
Winner	2020 Cameroon
- * Club domestic league appearances and goals as of 03:07, 13 September 2026 (UTC) ‡ National team caps and goals as of 18 June 2023

Ismail Khafi (Arabic: إسماعيل خافي; born 19 September 1995) is a Moroccan professional footballer who plays as a striker for Botola club Raja CA.

== Club career ==
Ismail Khafi began his professional career with TAS Casablanca in 2016. Between 2018 and 2023, he played for Moroccan clubs Ittihad Khemisset, MC Oujda and AS FAR.

On 23 January 2023, he joined Qatari Second Division club Al-Sailiya for six months.

On 5 August 2023, he signed a two-year contract with Ittihad Tanger. At the end of the 2023–24 season, he scored 13 goals in 28 league matches, finishing second in the scoring charts behind Yousri Bouzok.

In June 2024, he moved to Kuwait to join Qadsia SC. He finished the season as his team's top scorer with 16 goals in 37 matches.

On 16 August 2025, Raja CA announced the completion of the transfer of Ismail Khafi. He signed a two-year contract with the option of a third year.

== International career ==
In December 2020, he was called up by Houcine Ammouta with the A' national team for a preparation training camp against Guinea. On 8 January 2021, he took part in the friendly match and scored a goal in the 71st minute (victory, 2–1).

In 2021, he was part of the Moroccan team that won the 2020 African Nations Championship. During the competition, he made two appearances, against Rwanda and Zambia.

== Honours ==
=== Club ===
AS FAR

- Botola : 2022–23
- Moroccan Throne Cup: 2019–20

=== International ===
- African Nations Championship: 2020
