= JO Ouezzane =

Moroccan football club

Olympic Ouezzane
- Full name: Olympic Youth Ouezzane
- Founded: 1936
- Ground: Stade Municipal d´Ouezzane
- Capacity: 5000
- Manager: Abdellah Marzouk
- League: GNFA 1 Nord
Home colours	Away colours

Olympic Youth Ouezzane, also called JOO Ouezzane is a Moroccan football club currently playing in the Second division. They also have a Basketball club playing in the division I Federation Royal Morocaine Basketball (FRMBB). The club is located in the town of Ouezzane.
