= Amin Zahzouh =

Moroccan footballer (born 200)

Personal information
- Full name: El Amin Zahzouh
- Date of birth: 11 August 2000 (age 26)
- Place of birth: M'diq, Morocco
- Height: 1.75 m (5 ft 9 in)
- Position: Attacking midfielder

Team information
- Current team: Al-Wakrah
- Number: 75

Youth career
- Mohammed VI Football Academy
- 2019–2020: Angers
- 2020–2021: Union Touarga

Senior career*
Years	Team	Apps	(Gls)
2021–2023	Union Touarga	68	(22)
2023–2025	AS FAR	53	(18)
2025–	Al-Wakrah	13	(5)

International career^{‡}
2024	Morocco U23	1	(0)
2025–	Morocco	7	(0)
Medal record
Representing Morocco
Men's football
FIFA Arab Cup
Winner	2025 Qatar	Team
- * Club domestic league appearances and goals as of 17 January 2026 ‡ National team caps and goals as of 18 December 2025

El Amin Zahzouh (Arabic: أمين زحزوح; born 1 August 2000) is a Moroccan professional football player who plays as an attacking midfielder for Qatar Stars League club Al-Wakrah and the Morocco national team.

== Career ==
A youth product of Mohammed VI Football Academy, Zahzouh had a year-long stint with Angers in 2019 before returning to Morocco with Union Touarga in 2020. On 13 July 2023, He transferred to AS FAR. On 14 November 2024 after a successful debut season where he was named the Botola Newcomer of the Season, he extended his contract with AS FAR until 2027. On 21 July 2025, he was transferred to the Qatar Stars League club Al-Wakrah.

== International career ==
In June 2025, he was called up to the senior Morocco national team for a set of friendlies.

== Honours ==
AS FAR

- Botola Pro: 2022–23

Morocco A'

- FIFA Arab Cup: 2025

=== Individual ===
- 2023–24 Botola Pro Newcomer of the Season
