= Badreddine Benachour =

Moroccan footballer

Badreddine Banachour
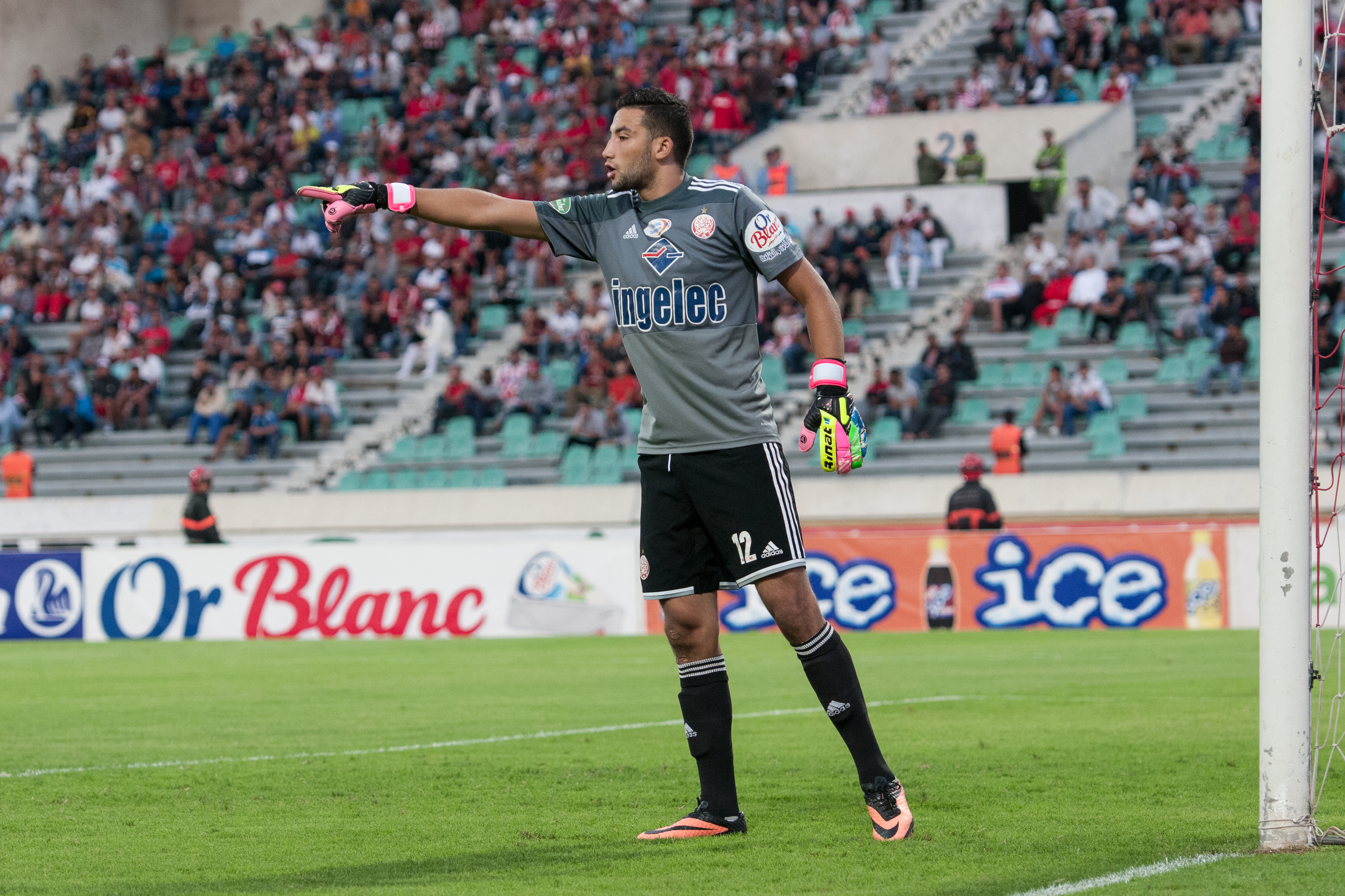
- Benachour with Wydad AC in 2014

Personal information
- Full name: Badreddine Benachour
- Date of birth: 9 August 1994 (age 32)
- Place of birth: Casablanca, Morocco
- Height: 1.86 m (6 ft 1 in)
- Position: Goalkeeper

Team information
- Current team: Ittihad Tanger
- Number: 94

Youth career
- Academy Mohammed VI
- 2011–2013: Wydad AC

Senior career*
Years	Team	Apps	(Gls)
2013–2020	Wydad AC		
2020	→ SCC Mohammédia (loan)		
2020–2021	TAS de Casablanca		
2021–2022	Al-Kawkab		
2022–	Ittihad Tanger	8	(0)

International career
2015–	Morocco U23	5	(1)
- * Club domestic league appearances and goals

Badreddine Benachour (Arabic: بدر الدين بنعاشور; born 2 July 1994) is a Moroccan footballer currently playing for Ittihad Tanger as a goalkeeper.

== Honours ==
Individual

- Toulon Tournament Best Goalkeeper: 2015
