= Zakaria Kiani =

French professional footballer

Personal information
- Date of birth: 22 January 1997 (age 29)
- Place of birth: Morocco
- Position: Right-back

Team information
- Current team: Ittihad Tanger
- Number: 22

Senior career*
Years	Team	Apps	(Gls)
2017–2018	Raja Beni Mellal		
- KAC Kénitra
2018–2020	Renaissance Zemamra		
2020–2021	Wydad Casablanca		
2022	Youssoufia Berrechid		
2022–	Ittihad Tanger	18	(1)
- * Club domestic league appearances and goals as of 15 April 2023

Zakaria Kiani (Arabic: زكرياء كياني) is a Moroccan professional footballer who plays as a right-back for Ittihad Tanger.
