= Saniat Rmel Stadium =

Football stadium in Tétouan, Morocco

Coordinates: 35°34′21″N 5°20′55″W

- La Hípica
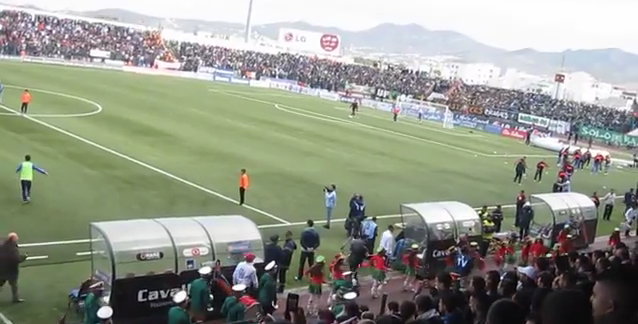
- Interactive map of Saniat Rmel Stadium
- Former names: Estadio de Varela
- Location: Bd/ Abdelkhalak Torres, Tétouan, Morocco
- Owner: MA Tétouan
- Capacity: 7,000
- Surface: Grass

Tenant
- MA Tétouan

Saniat Rmel Stadium (formerly known as La Hìpica) is a football stadium in Tétouan, Morocco. It is the home ground of MA Tétouan.It used to be during colonial period a bullring where the stadium was filled with sand. There comes the same saniat rmel, which means fry of sand.
