= Abdou Atchabao =

Togolese-born Gabonese footballer

Personal information
- Full name: Abdou Djamilou Atchabao
- Date of birth: 7 November 1990 (age 35)
- Place of birth: Dapaong, Togo
- Position: Forward

Team information
- Current team: Ittihad Tanger
- Number: 45

Senior career*
Years	Team	Apps	(Gls)
- AAFA Lomé
- Tigre Noir Zephyr Baguida
2012–2019	CF Mounana		
2019–2021	Nahdat Zemamra	37	(11)
2021	AS FAR	8	(0)
2022	MAS Fes	7	(0)
2022–	IR Tanger	7	(0)

International career^{‡}
2016	Gabon	1	(0)
- * Club domestic league appearances and goals as of 15 April 2023 ‡ National team caps and goals as of 4 june 2021

Abdou Atchabao (born 18 June 1990) is a Togolese-born Gabonese professional footballer, who plays as a striker for Ittihad Tanger.
