= Mohamed Saoud =

Moroccan boxer

Personal information
- Nationality: Moroccan
- Born: 31 December 1949 (age 75)

Sport
- Sport: Boxing

Mohamed Saoud (born 31 December 1949) is a Moroccan boxer. He competed in the men's middleweight event at the 1976 Summer Olympics. At the 1976 Summer Olympics, he lost to David Odwell of Great Britain.
