= Katulondi Kati =

Congolese footballer (born 1999)

Personal information
- Full name: Katulondi Kati Joyce
- Date of birth: 19 October 1999 (age 27)
- Place of birth: Kinshasa, DR Congo
- Height: 1.89 m (6 ft 2 in)
- Position: Forward

Team information
- Current team: Lokomotiv Sofia
- Number: 18

Youth career
- 2020: Motema Pembe

Senior career*
Years	Team	Apps	(Gls)
2021–2022	Motema Pembe		
2022–2025	Hassania Agadir	82	(16)
2026	Navbahor	10	(1)
2026–	Lokomotiv Sofia	4	(0)
- * Club domestic league appearances and goals as of 10 November 2026

Katulondi Kati Joyce (born 19 October 1999) is a Congolese professional footballer who plays as a forward for Bulgarian First League club Lokomotiv Sofia.

== Career ==
=== Navbahor ===
On 16 February 2026, he signed a one year contract with the Uzbekistan Super League club Navbahor.

== Career statistics ==
As of 27 April 2026

Club	Season	League			Cup		Continental		Total	
Club	Season	Division	Apps	Goals	Apps	Goals	Apps	Goals	Apps	Goals
Navbahor	2026	Uzbekistan Super League	9	1	0	0	–		9	1
Career total			9	1	0	0	–		9	1
