= Gaya Merbah =

Algerian footballer (born 1994)

Gaya Merbah ⴳⴰⵢⴰ ⵎⴻⵔⴱⴰⵃ
Personal information
- Full name: Gaya Merbah
- Date of birth: 22 July 1994 (age 32)
- Place of birth: Tadmaït, Algeria
- Height: 1.90 m (6 ft 3 in)
- Position: Goalkeeper

Youth career
- –2012: JS Tadmait
- 2013–2014: JS Kabylie

Senior career*
Years	Team	Apps	(Gls)
2012–2013	NARB Réghaïa		
2014–2015	RC Kouba		
2015–2016	RC Arbaâ	11	(0)
2016–2019	NA Hussein Dey	43	(0)
2019–2022	CR Belouizdad	28	(0)
2022–2023	Raja CA	7	(0)
2023	→ IR Tanger (loan)	14	(0)
2023–2024	IR Tanger	24	(0)
2024–2026	JS Kabylie	19	(0)

International career
2019	Algeria A'	5	(0)
- * Club domestic league appearances and goals as of 16 September 2026

Gaya Merbah (Arabic: قايا مرباح; Tamazight: ⴳⴰⵢⴰ ⵎⴻⵔⴱⴰⵃ; born 22 July 1994) is an Algerian professional footballer who plays as a goalkeeper.

== Personal life ==
Gaya Merbah is the twin brother of defensive midfielder Messala Merbah and the cousin of centre-back Abdelmalek Merbah.

== Club career ==
In 2019, Gaya signed a contract with CR Belouizdad. In 2022, he signed a three-and-a-half-year contract with Raja CA. In 2024, he joined JS Kabylie, signing a five-year contract with the Kabyle club. On 16 September 2026, he left JS Kabylie.

== Honours ==
CR Belouizdad

- Algerian Ligue Professionnelle 1: 2019–20, 2020–21

Individual

- Raja CA Player of the Month: March 2022
- Algerian Ligue Professionnelle 1 Player of the Month: February 2026
