= Sofian El Moudane =

Franco-Moroccan footballer (born 1994)

Personal information
- Full name: Sofian Yanis El Moudane
- Date of birth: 16 March 1994 (age 32)
- Place of birth: Saint-Étienne, France
- Height: 1.77 m (5 ft 10 in)
- Position: Midfielder

Team information
- Current team: Hassania Agadir

Youth career
- Suc Terrenoire
- Saint-Étienne

Senior career*
Years	Team	Apps	(Gls)
2017	Hauts Lyonnais		
2018	Athlético Marseille	13	(0)
2019	Senica	27	(3)
2020	IR Tanger	17	(4)
2020–2021	Wydad AC	7	(0)
2021–2022	RS Berkane	25	(1)
2023	IR Tanger	14	(5)
2023	Al-Jandal	4	(0)
2023–2025	Hassania Agadir	0	(0)
2025–	Olympic Safi	0	(0)
- * Club domestic league appearances and goals as of 15 April 2023

Sofian El Moudane (born 16 March 1994) is a Franco-Moroccan professional footballer who plays as a midfielder for Hassania Agadir.

== Career ==
El Moudane made his professional Fortuna Liga debut for Senica against AS Trenčín on 16 February 2019.

On 16 June 2023, El Moudane joined Saudi Arabian club Al-Jandal.

On 9 September 2023, El Moudane joined Hassania Agadir.

== Honours ==
Individual

- Botola Pro Team of the Season: 2022–23
