= 2024–25 IR Tanger season =

Ittihad Tanger
2024–25 season
- President: Mohammed Cherkaoui (until 27 September); Nassrallah El Guartit (elected; from 28 October)
- Manager: Hilal Et-tair
- Stadium: Saniat Rmel (6 matches); Kenitra Municipal (1 match); Village Ziaten
- Botola: 10th
- Throne Cup: Round of 32
- Excellence Cup: Group stage
- Top goalscorer: Ali El Harrak, Hamza El Wasti (7)
- Biggest win: Home: IR Tanger 3–1 Raja CA; IR Tanger 4–2 OC Safi; Away: HUS Agadir 0–1 IR Tanger; OC Safi 2–3 IR Tanger
- Biggest defeat: Home: IR Tanger 0–2 US Touarga; IR Tanger 1–3 RS Berkane; Away: US Touarga 4–1 IR Tanger
Home colours	Away colours
- All statistics correct as of 11 May 2025.

The 2024–25 season is Ittihad Riadi Tanger's 42nd season in existence and the club's 26th in the top flight of Moroccan football, and tenth consecutive.

== Kit ==
- Supplier: Gloria
- Club Sponsor: Tanger-Med (front)
- League Sponsor: Inwi (sleeves)

Home	Away	Third	Goalkeeper 1	Goalkeeper 2

== Squad ==
As of match played 11 May 2025

No.	Name	Nationality	Position	Date of birth (age)	Signed from	Signed in	Contract ends	Apps.	Goals
Goalkeepers
1	Amine El Ouaad	(Morocco) (Morocco)	GK	8 December 1995 (age 30)	Free agent	2025		15	(-20)
12	Rayan Azouagh	(Morocco) (Belgium)	GK	3 June 2007 (age 19)	Academy	2024	2027	5	(-4)
73	Youssef Laghzal	(Morocco)	GK	1 January 2001 (age 25)	WA Fès	2023	2026	6	(-7)
Defenders
2	Youssef Chaina	(Morocco)	DF	12 October 1992 (age 34)	OC Khouribga	2023	2025	33	2
3	Badr Gaddarine	(Morocco)	DF	20 October 1997 (age 29)	Free agent	2025		6	0
4	Mohamed Saoud	(Morocco)	DF	30 January 1996 (age 30)	MA Tetouan	2023	2026	35	4
13	Oussama Al Aiz	(Morocco)	DF	30 November 1999 (age 26)	Academy	2020	2026	59	0
15	Ayoub Jarfi (3rd captain)	(Morocco)	DF	4 March 1996 (age 30)	Academy	2016		154	2
22	Zakaria Kiani	(Morocco)	RB	22 January 1997 (age 29)	CAY Berrechid	2022		74	2
23	Anass Lamrabat	(Morocco)	DF	13 July 1993 (age 33)	MA Tétouan	2023	2025	42	0
24	Akram El Wahabi	(Spain) (Morocco)	DF	1 January 2004 (age 22)	Academy	2024		3	0
31	Walid Bencherifa	(Algeria)	DF	6 November 1988 (age 38)	OC Khouribga	2023	2025	50	0
77	Bilal El Ouadghiri	(Morocco)	DF	3 August 2001 (age 25)	Free agent	2025		14	1
Midfielders
5	Mohsine Moutaouali (captain)	(Morocco)	MF	3 March 1986 (age 40)	Free agent	2025 (2)		34	8
6	Nouaman Aarab (vice-captain)	(Morocco)	MF	26 August 1990 (age 36)	CA Khénifra	2017	2025	184	5
8	Abdelmottalib Faouzi	(Morocco)	MF	19 July 1993 (age 33)	CR Bernoussi	2019	2025	111	8
16	Ahmed Chentouf	(Morocco)	MF	5 December 1996 (age 29)	HUS Agadir (A)	2023 (2)	2025	131	6
17	Abdelhamid Maâli	(Morocco)	MF	16 March 2006 (age 20)	Academy	2023	2026	44	0
20	Ennama El Bellali	(Morocco)	MF	17 February 1998 (age 28)	JS Soualem	2025		14	0
21	Hamza Moudene	(Morocco)	MF	20 December 1995 (age 30)	RCA Zemamra	2025		12	0
29	Adam Darazi	(France) (Morocco)	MF	24 January 2005 (age 21)	Stade Beaucairois FC	2025		4	0
33	Salaheddine Cheffani	(Morocco)	MF	27 June 2004 (age 22)	Mohammed VI FA	2022	2025	6	0
78	Siriki Sanogo	(Ivory Coast)	MF	21 December 2001 (age 24)	Free agent	2025		2	0
Forwards
14	Haitam El Bahja	(Morocco)	FW	23 December 1993 (age 32)	JS Soualem	2025		15	4
18	Hamza El Wasti	(Morocco)	FW	28 October 1995 (age 31)	SCC Mohammédia	2023	2025	55	8
19	Jawad Ghabra	(Morocco)	FW	9 November 1994 (age 32)	RCA Zemamra	2022		46	8
30	Ali El Harrak	(Morocco) (Spain)	FW	31 July 1997 (age 29)	Free agent	2023		39	7
96	Livty Kpolo	(France) (Ivory Coast)	FW	17 May 2002 (age 24)	Grenoble Foot 38 B	2025		11	0
99	Zakaria Bakkali	(Belgium) (Morocco)	FW	26 January 1996 (age 30)	Free agent	2025		14	1
Players who have left the club during the season
72	Badreddine Benachour	(Morocco)	GK	8 September 1994 (age 32)	Al-Kawkab FC	2022		22	(-20)
35	Mohammed Moujahid	(Morocco)	FW	22 December 2003 (age 22)	Academy	2024		12	0

- (A) = originally from the academy

=== From youth squad ===
No.	Name	Nationality	Position	Date of birth (age)	Signed from	Signed in	Contract ends	Apps.	Goals
26	Yassine Hachloufi	(Morocco)	GK	20 April 2006 (age 20)	Academy	2024		0	(0)
27	Soulaiman Ait Dani	(Morocco)	FW	27 February 2005 (age 21)	Academy	2024		1	0
34	Mohammed El Guartit	(Morocco)	MF	1 January 2005 (age 21)	Academy	2025		1	0
36	Mohammed Ayman Ahaytaf	(Morocco)	DF		Academy	2024		0	0
37	Imrane Asarghine	(Morocco)	FW		Academy	2024		0	0
38	Noureddine Benfakir	(Morocco)	MF	27 October 2005 (age 21)	Academy	2024		0	0
39	Yahya Zekri	(Morocco)	MF	16 March 2006 (age 20)	Academy	2024		0	0
40	Ayoub Andaloussi	(Morocco)	MF	13 March 2006 (age 20)	Academy	2024		0	0
41	Wassim Mouloud	(Morocco)	DF	8 February 2005 (age 21)	Academy	2024		0	0
43	Mouad Frizit	(Morocco)	MF		Academy	2024		1	0
44	Adil Garnan	(Morocco)	DF	10 July 2004 (age 22)	Academy	2024		0	0
45	Marwane Lahbouri	(Morocco)	FW		Academy	2024		0	0
46	Salmane Achiban	(Morocco)	DF		Academy	2024		0	0
47	Omar Barrak Belakhdar	(Morocco)	MF	3 February 2006 (age 20)	Academy	2024		0	0
48	Achraf El Quaraoui	(Morocco)	MF		Academy	2024		0	0
49	Louay El Moussaoui	(Morocco)	MF	20 March 2004 (age 22)	Academy	2024		2	0
50	Youssef Ezzarradi	(Morocco)	DF	20 September 2004 (age 22)	Academy	2025		0	0
52	Othmane El Hajjami	(Morocco)	MF		Academy	2024		0	0
54	Abdellah Zbadi	(Morocco)	FW	13 October 2004 (age 22)	Academy	2024		0	0
60	Mohamed Es Snouni	(Morocco)	FW	1 January 2004 (age 22)	Academy	2024		0	0
62	Saad El Kaddouri	(Morocco)	MF		Academy	2024		0	0
64	Nawfal Chninak	(Morocco) (France)	FW	30 June 2006 (age 20)	Montpellier HSC U19	2025	2028	0	0
66	Ayman El Hachmi	(Belgium) (Morocco)	MF	6 May 2005 (age 21)	KV Kortrijk U21	2025		0	0
67	Haytham Bakhlakh	(England) (Morocco)	MF	25 June 2006 (age 20)	FC Clacton	2025		0	0
75	Moussa Koté	(Senegal)	FW	12 April 2006 (age 20)	Dial Diop SC	2025		1	0

== Transfers ==
=== In ===
No.	Pos	Player	Transferred from	Fee	Date	Source
5	MF	(Morocco) Mohsine Moutaouali	Free agent (Note: Most recently played for HUS Agadir)	Free Transfer	18 January 2025	
77	DF	(Morocco) Bilal El Ouadghiri	Free agent (Note: Most recently played for Fath US)	Free Transfer	18 January 2025	
14	FW	(Morocco) Haitam El Bahja	JS Soualem		18 January 2025	
3	DF	(Morocco) Badr Gaddarine	Free agent (Note: Most recently played for Wydad AC)	Free Transfer	18 January 2025	
21	MF	(Morocco) Hamza Moudene	RCA Zemamra	Free Transfer	18 January 2025	
1	GK	(Morocco) Amine El Ouaad	Free agent (Note: Most recently played for RS Berkane)	Free Transfer	18 January 2025	
99	FW	(Belgium) Zakaria Bakkali	Free agent (Note: Most recently played for RKC Waalwijk)	Free Transfer	18 January 2025	
20	MF	(Morocco) Ennama El Bellali	JS Soualem	€38.000	18 January 2025	
78	MF	(Ivory Coast) Siriki Sanogo	Free agent (Note: Most recently played for Benevento Calcio)	Free Transfer	18 January 2025	
96	FW	(France) Livty Kpolo	(France) Grenoble Foot 38 B	Free Transfer	18 January 2025	
29	MF	(France) Adam Darazi	(France) Stade Beaucairois FC	Free Transfer		

=== Promoted ===
No.	Pos	Player	Contract Until	Date	Source
12	GK	(Morocco) Rayan Azouagh	2027	20 December 2024	

=== Contract renewals ===
No.	Pos.	Player	Contract length	Contract ends	Date	Ref.

=== Out ===
No.	Pos	Player	Transferred to	Fee	Date	Source
1	GK	(Algeria) Gaya Merbah	(Algeria) JS Kabylie	Free Transfer	1 July 2024	
9	FW	(Morocco) Ismail Khafi	(Kuwait) Qadsia SC	Free Transfer	4 July 2024	
80	MF	(Senegal) El Hadji Madické Kane	(Sudan) Al Hilal S.C.		17 July 2024	
14	MF	(Morocco) Mohamed Said Bouksyr	KAC Marrakech	Free Transfer	27 July 2024	
12	GK	(Morocco) Imad Askar	USM d'Oujda	Free Transfer	1 September 2024	
29	DF	(Senegal) El Hadji Youssoupha Konaté	(Iraq) Newroz SC	Free Transfer	5 October 2024	
70	MF	(Morocco) Hamza Hassani Boouia	(Libya) Mokhtar Tobruk	Free Transfer	1 July 2024	
20	FW	(Morocco) Hassan Zraibi	Free agent	Free Transfer	1 July 2024	
10	MF	(Morocco) Reda Jaadi	later MA Tetouan		1 July 2024	
7	FW	(Morocco) Nabil Jaadi	Free agent		1 July 2024	
93	FW	(Morocco) Zouhair El Ouassli	later JS Soualem	Free Transfer	1 July 2024	
28	FW	(Spain) Alexis Sánchez	MA Tetouan	Free Transfer	31 January 2025	
72	GK	(Morocco) Badreddine Benachour	Free agent	Free Transfer	9 January 2025	
21	MF	(Morocco) Mahmoud El Kayssoumi	R Beni Mellal	Free Transfer	30 January 2025	

=== Loans out ===
No.	Pos	Player	Loaned to	Fee	Date	On loan until	Source
35	FW	(Morocco) Mohammed Moujahid	WAS Kalaat Sraghna	None	1 February 2025	End of Season	

== Technical staff ==
Position	Name
First team head coach	(Morocco) Hilal Et-tair
Assistant coach	(Morocco) Abdelouahed Benkacem
Fitness coach	(Morocco) Rachid Blej
Goalkeeping coach	(Morocco) Mohammed Bestara
Performance analyst	(Morocco) Ahmed Zekhnini

== Pre-season and friendlies ==
28 August 2024 1	IR Tanger	2–0	WJ Tanger	Tanger, Morocco
--:-- UTC+1	Kiani; El Harrak	Report		Stadium: Stade Village Ziaten

14 September 2024 2	IR Tanger	0–2	COD Meknès	Tanger, Morocco
11:00 UTC+1		Report	Rabja; Mehri	Stadium: Stade Village Ziaten

== Competitions ==
Win Draw Loss

=== Overview ===
Competition	First match	Last match	Starting round	Final position	Record							
Competition	First match	Last match	Starting round	Final position	Pld	W	D	L	GF	GA	GD	Win %
Botola	31 August 2024	11 May 2025	Matchday 1	10th	30	9	10	11	35	37	−2	30.00
Throne Cup	27 March 2024		Round of 32	Round of 32	1	0	0	1	0	1	−1	0.00
Excellence Cup	4 September 2024	19 March 2025	Group stage	Group stage	6	0	0	6	5	15	−10	0.00
Total					37	9	10	18	40	53	−13	24.32

Last updated: 11 May 2025.
Source: Competitions

=== Botola ===
==== Standings ====
Pos	Team	Pld	W	D	L	GF	GA	GD	Pts	Qualification or relegation
8	Olympic Safi	30	12	10	8	37	33	+4	46	Qualification for Confederation Cup (Note: Olympic Safi qualified for the CAF Confederation Cup by winning the 2024–25 Moroccan Throne Cup.)
9	Difaâ El Jadidi	30	11	9	10	36	42	−6	42	
10	IR Tanger	30	9	10	11	35	37	−2	37	
11	COD Meknès	30	9	9	12	27	44	−17	36	
12	Union de Touarga	30	8	11	11	29	34	−5	35	

Source: FRMF.ma
Rules for classification: 1) Points; 2a) Head-to-head goal difference if they are two teams with equal points; 2b) Goal difference if they are more than two teams with equal points; 3) Number of wins; 4) Goals scored; 5) Play-off between involved teams.

==== Results summary ====
Overall								Home						Away					
Pld	W	D	L	GF	GA	GD	Pts	W	D	L	GF	GA	GD	W	D	L	GF	GA	GD
30	9	10	11	35	37	−2	37	6	5	4	19	15	+4	3	5	7	16	22	−6

Last updated: 11 May 2024.
Source: kooora.com

==== Results by round ====
Round	1	2	3	4	5	6	7	8	9	10	11	12	13	14	15	16	17	18	19	20	21	22	23	24	25	26	27	28	29	30
Ground	A	H	A	A	H	A	H	A	H	A	H	A	H	A	H	H	A	H	H	A	H	A	H	A	H	A	H	A	H	A
Result	W	W	D	D	D	W	L	L	D	D	L	L	D	L	D	W	D	L	W	L	W	L	W	D	D	L	L	W	W	L
Position	2	2	1	1	1	1	4	6	7	8	9	11	12	13	14	12	10	11	9	12	9	12	11	11	11	12	12	12	10	10

Updated to match(es) played on 11 May 2025. Source: Botola
A = Away; H = Home; W = Win; D = Draw; L = Loss

==== Matches ====
31 August 2024 1	HUS Agadir	0–1	IR Tanger	Agadir
21:00 UTC+1	El Moudane (yellow card) 6'	Report	El Harrak 30'; Lamrabat (yellow card) 88'; Ait Dani (yellow card) 90+4'; Benachour (yellow card) 90+6'	Stadium: Stade Adrar; Referee: Saadi El Hanafi

25 September 2024 2	IR Tanger	3–1	Raja CA	Tétouan
18:00 UTC+1	El Harrak 4', 10'; Bencherifa (yellow card) 24'; Ghabra 44' (yellow card) 45'; Benachour (yellow card) 68'; Chaina (yellow card) 83'	Report	Khafifi (yellow card) 12'; Bouzok 79'	Stadium: Saniat Rmel Stadium; Attendance: 0 Referee: Said Boujidi
Note: Due to Ibn Battuta Stadium renovation, the team hosted its match at Saniat Rmel Stadium. The match, originally scheduled for 14 September 2024, was pushed back because of the involvement of Raja CA at the 2024–25 CAF Champions League.

29 September 2024 4	Fath US	0–0	IR Tanger	Casablanca
18:00 UTC+1	Bahsain (yellow card) 22'; Raoui (yellow card) 73'; Souane (yellow card) 80'	Report	Faouzi (yellow card) 14'; Al Aiz (red card) 42'; Chaina (red card) 56'; El Wasti (yellow card) 90+2'	Stadium: Père Jégo Stadium; Attendance: 0 Referee: Abdelmounaim Baslam

2 October 2024 3	RS Berkane	0–0	IR Tanger	Berkane
20:00 UTC+1	M. Santos (yellow card) 26'; Lamlioui (yellow card) 90'	Report	Jarfi (yellow card) 15'; Benachour (yellow card) 90' (yellow-red card) 90'; Azouagh (yellow card) 90+11'	Stadium: Stade Municipal de Berkane; Referee: Abderrahim Arrakhiz
Note: The match, originally scheduled for 21 September 2024, was pushed back because of the involvement of RS Berkne at the 2024–25 CAF Confederation Cup.

6 October 2024 5	IR Tanger	1–1	AS FAR	Tétouan
18:00 UTC+1	El Harrak 4'; Kiani (yellow card) 9'; Maâli (yellow card) 20'; Faouzi (yellow card) 31'; Lamrabat (yellow card) 85'; Al Aiz (yellow card) 86'; El Wasti (yellow card) 88'	Report	Ajoughlal (yellow card) 31'; Bach 82'; Nakach (yellow card) 86'; Tó Carneiro (yellow card) 88'	Stadium: Saniat Rmel Stadium; Attendance: 0 Referee: Zouhair Kadim
Note: Due to Ibn Battuta Stadium renovation, the team hosted its match at Saniat Rmel Stadium.

20 October 2024 6	OC Safi	2–3	IR Tanger	Safi
20:00 UTC+1	Lamirat (yellow card) 8'; Samake (yellow card) 42' (goal) 58'; Qassaq (yellow card) 68'; Diarra 90+3' (pen.)	Report	Jarfi (yellow card) 8'; Faouzi 41'; Ghabra 52'; Saoud (yellow card) 59'; El Wasti 70' (pen.)	Stadium: Stade El Massira; Referee: Azzedine Abouelfaid

23 October 2024 7	IR Tanger	0–1	RCA Zemamra	Tétouan
20:00 UTC+1	Ghabra (yellow card) 45'; Chaina (yellow card) 89'; Saoud (yellow card) 90+1'	Report	Gourad 90+4' (yellow card) 90+7'	Stadium: Saniat Rmel Stadium; Attendance: 0 Referee: Driss Zine
Note: Due to Ibn Battuta Stadium renovation, the team hosted its match at Saniat Rmel Stadium.

27 October 2024 8	JS Soualem	2–1	IR Tanger	Berrechid
18:00 UTC+1	Lagrouch 55'; Razko 57'; Hmaidou (yellow card) 83'	Report	Chaina 17'; Bencherifa (yellow card) 27'; Jarfi (yellow card) 51'	Stadium: Berrechid Municipal Stadium; Referee: Nabil Benrkia

3 November 2024 9	IR Tanger	1–1	Maghreb AS	Tétouan
20:00 UTC+1	El Harrak 32'; Ghabra (yellow card) 37'; Saoud (yellow card) 68'	Report	Dieye 80'	Stadium: Saniat Rmel Stadium; Attendance: 0 Referee: Moncef Zine Alaoui
Note: Due to Ibn Battuta Stadium renovation, the team hosted its match at Saniat Rmel Stadium.

9 November 2024 10	Wydad AC	2–2	IR Tanger	Casablanca
20:00 UTC+1	Moutaraji 31'; Harkass (yellow card) 52'; Bouna Amar 83'; Chadli (yellow card) 90+5'	Report	Jarfi (yellow card) 32'; Faouzi 45+3'; Saoud 53' (pen.); Kiani (yellow card) 58'; Bencherifa (yellow card) 75'	Stadium: Larbi Zaouli Stadium; Referee: Mohamed Jamlaoui

23 November 2024 11	IR Tanger	1–2	MA Tétouan	Kenitra
16:00 UTC+1	Ghabra 55' (pen.); Saoud (yellow card) 56'	Report	Darai 12'; Kamal 19' (pen.) (yellow card) 20'; El Filali (yellow card) 45+8'	Stadium: Kenitra Municipal Stadium; Referee: Mohcine Sourdy
Note: Due to Ibn Battuta Stadium renovation, the team hosted its match at Kenitra Municipal Stadium.

29 November 2024 12	US Touarga	3–1	IR Tanger	Khemisset
18:00 UTC+1	Chemlal 28' (pen.); Dahak 52' (yellow card) 53'; Haddad 55'	Report	El Wasti 33'; Kiani (yellow card) 48'; Jarfi (yellow card) 59'	Stadium: 18 November Stadium; Referee: Ahmed Aderdour

8 December 2024 13	IR Tanger	1–1	SCC Mohammédia	Tangier
15:00 UTC+1	Aarab (yellow card) 56'; El Wasti 58'; Maâli (yellow card) 87'	Report	Ezzine (yellow card) 25'; Rhailouf (yellow card) 30' (goal) 36'; Ennakouss (yellow card) 84'; Gari (yellow card) 86'	Stadium: Village Ziaten Stadium; Attendance: 0 Referee: Jamal Belbasri

14 December 2024 14	COD Meknès	1–0	IR Tanger	Meknes
16:00 UTC+1	Eddib 80'; Malki (yellow card) 90+64'	Report	Jarfi (yellow card) 72'; Chaina (yellow card) 86'	Stadium: Honneur Stadium; Referee: Karim Sabry

21 December 2024 15	IR Tanger	1–1	DH El Jadidi	Tangier
16:00 UTC+1	El Harrak 17' (yellow card) 54'; Bencherifa (yellow card) 45+1'; Ghabra (yellow card) 79'; Maâli (yellow card) 88'	Report	El Hasnaoui (yellow card) 63'; Arjoune (yellow card) 65'; Sahd 90+7'	Stadium: Village Ziaten Stadium; Referee: Hamza El Fareq

28 December 2024 16	IR Tanger	1–0	HUS Agadir	Tangier
16:00 UTC+1	Ghabra 14'; Al Aiz (yellow card) 52'; Chaina (yellow card) 64'; Moujahid (yellow card) 71'; El Wahabi (yellow card) 76'; Faouzi (yellow card) 83'; Laghzal (yellow card) 90+2'; Aarab (yellow card) 90+4'	Report	El Qaada (yellow card) 5'	Stadium: Village Ziaten Stadium; Referee: Mustapha Kechaf

18 January 2025 19	IR Tanger	1–0	Fath US	Tangier
16:00 UTC+1	El Harrak 37'; El Ouadghiri (yellow card) 68'; Ghabra (penalty missed) 69'	Report	Bahsain (yellow card) 45+1'; Raoui (yellow card) 75'	Stadium: Village Ziaten Stadium; Referee: Slimane El Atifi

23 January 2025 17	Raja CA	1–1	IR Tanger	Casablanca
18:00 UTC+1	Ferdaoussi (yellow card) 7'; Bikoro (yellow card) 35'; Baadi (yellow card) 45+4' (goal) 90+4'	Report	Ghabra (yellow card) 14'; El Bellali (yellow card) 57'; Bakkali 72'	Stadium: Larbi Zaouli Stadium; Referee: Hicham Temsamani
Note: The match, originally scheduled for 4 January 2025, was pushed back because of the involvement of Raja CA at the 2024–25 CAF Champions League.

26 January 2025 18	IR Tanger	1–3	RS Berkane	Tangier
16:00 UTC+1	El Ouaad (yellow card) 86'; El Bahja 90+1'	Report	Lamlioui 18'; Camara (yellow card) 27'; Mehri 67'; Dayo 88' (pen.); Khairi (yellow card) 90+3'	Stadium: Village Ziaten Stadium; Referee: Karim Sabry
Note: The match, originally scheduled for 12 January 2025, was pushed back because of the involvement of RS Berkane at the 2024–25 CAF Confederation Cup.

8 February 2025 20	AS FAR	3–2	IR Tanger	Kenitra
18:00 UTC+1	Inonga (yellow card) 34'; El Fahli 45+1', 49'; Hrimat 90+7' (pen.)	Report	El Bellali (yellow card) 26'; El Wasti 64'; Moutaouali 84' (yellow card) 85'	Stadium: Kenitra Municipal Stadium; Referee: Said Boujidi

15 February 2025 21	IR Tanger	4–2	OC Safi	Tangier
16:00 UTC+1	El Wasti 13', 20'; El Bahja (yellow card) 34'; Faouzi 48'; Bakkali (yellow card) 65'; Moutaouali 80' (pen.)	Report	Morsli (yellow card) 13'; Diarra 28' (pen.), 56'; Qassaq (yellow card) 46'; Yechou (yellow card) 87'	Stadium: Village Ziaten Stadium; Referee: Mohamed Jamlaoui

23 February 2025 22	RCA Zemamra	2–0	IR Tanger	Zemamra
16:00 UTC+1	Benhalib 30' (pen.); Marzak (yellow card) 49'; Sabbar (yellow card) 72'; Azri 78'; El Bajjani (yellow card) 90+1'; (yellow card) 90+4'	Report	Moutaouali (yellow card) 25'; Bencherifa (yellow card) 36'; Faouzi (yellow card) 58'; Lamrabat (yellow card) 77'	Stadium: Ahmed Choukri Stadium; Referee: Hicham Temsamani

27 February 2025 23	IR Tanger	1–0	JS Soualem	Tangier
15:00 UTC+1	El Wasti 61'; El Ouadghiri (yellow card) 66'; El Bahja (yellow card) 72'; Moudene (yellow card) 80'	Report	Alaoui (yellow card) 47'; Hmaidou (yellow card) 75'; Bentagana (yellow card) 89'	Stadium: Village Ziaten Stadium; Referee: Youssef Triki

8 March 2025 24	Maghreb AS	1–1	IR Tanger	Fez
22:00 UTC	Ahadad (yellow card) 11'; Fati 15'; Afsal (yellow card) 55'; Astati (yellow card) 90'	Report	Al Aiz (yellow card) 11'; Bencherifa (yellow card) 14'; Maâli (yellow card) 44'; El Bahja 50'; Kiani (yellow card) 77'; Et-tair (coach) (yellow card) 74'	Stadium: Stade Hassan-II; Referee: Mohamed El Houidri

15 March 2025 25	IR Tanger	1–1	Wydad AC	Tangier
22:00 UTC	Bencherifa (yellow card) 35'; Moutaouali (yellow card) 67'; El Wasti (yellow card) 68'; Moudene (yellow card) 75'; El Bellali (yellow card) 77'; El Bahja 78'	Report	Lorch 30'; Moufi (yellow card) 50'; Harkass (yellow card) 73'; Dairani (yellow card) 89'	Stadium: Village Ziaten Stadium; Referee: Hamza El Fareq

14 April 2025 26	MA Tétouan	2–1	IR Tanger	Tétouan
18:00 UTC+1	El Megri 3' (yellow card) 45+6'; Darai 15'; Chabboud (yellow card) 48'; Madkour (yellow card) 52' (red card) 53'; Tagnaouti (yellow card) 53'; R. Jaadi (yellow card) 66'; Ben Khajjou (yellow card) 75'; Lakhal (yellow card) 90'	Report	Chaina (yellow card) 45+5'; El Ouaad (yellow card) 45+5'; Moutaouali 50' (pen.)	Stadium: Saniat Rmel Stadium; Referee: Nabil Benrkia

23 April 2025 27	IR Tanger	0–1	US Touarga	Tangier
20:00 UTC+1	Faouzi (red card) 84'; Lamrabat (yellow card) 90+1'; Maâli (yellow card) 90+9'	Report	El Khalej 48' (pen.); Zraa (yellow card) 72'; Zahouani (yellow card) 86'	Stadium: Village Ziaten Stadium; Referee: Hicham Temsamani

4 May 2025 28	SCC Mohammédia	1–2	IR Tanger	Mohammédia
20:00 UTC+1	Sani (yellow card) 50'; Ennakouss 70'; By (yellow card) 87'	Report	El Bahja 28'; El Wasti (yellow card) 32'; Moutaouali 81' (pen.)	Stadium: El Bachir Stadium; Referee: Saadi Hanafi

8 May 2025 29	IR Tanger	2–0	COD Meknès	Tangier
20:00 UTC+1	El Ouadghiri 6' (yellow card) 56'; Al Aiz (yellow card) 45+2'; Ghabra 46'; Bakkali (yellow card) 90+6'	Report	Marroun (yellow card) 56'; Fiddi (yellow card) 90+7'	Stadium: Village Ziaten Stadium; Referee: Mohssine Sourdy

11 May 2025 30	DH El Jadidi	2–1	IR Tanger	El Jadida
20:00 UTC+1	Chichane (yellow card) 13'; Arjoune (yellow card) 29' (goal) 73'; El Hassnaoui (yellow card) 29'; Sahd 75'	Report	Maâli (yellow card) 45+1'; Jarfi (yellow card) 45+8'; Moutaouali 35' (pen.)	Stadium: Ben M'Hamed El Abdi Stadium; Referee: Salim Laarej

==== Results overview ====
Locations of the 2024–25 Botola teams

Win Draw Loss

Region	Team	Home score	Away score	Aggregate score
Casablanca-Settat	DH el Jadidi	1–1	2–1	2–3
Casablanca-Settat	JS Soualem	1–0	2–1	2–2
Casablanca-Settat	Raja CA	3–1	1–1	4–2
Casablanca-Settat	RCA Zemamra	0–1	2–3	0–3
Casablanca-Settat	SCC Mohammédia	1–1	1–2	3–2
Casablanca-Settat	Wydad AC	1–1	2–2	3–3
Rabat-Salé-Kénitra	AS FAR	1–1	3–2	3–4
Rabat-Salé-Kénitra	Fath US	1–0	0–0	1–0
Rabat-Salé-Kénitra	US Touarga	0–1	3–1	1–4
Fès-Meknès	COD Meknès	2–0	1–0	2–1
Fès-Meknès	Maghreb AS	1–1	1–1	2–2
Tanger-Tetouan-Al Hoceima	MA Tétouan	1–2	2–1	2–4
Oriental	RS Berkane	1–3	0–0	1–3
Marrakech-Safi	OC Safi	4–2	2–3	7–4
Souss-Massa	HUS Agadir	1–0	0–1	2–0

=== Throne Cup ===
27 March 2025 Round of 32	IR Tanger	0–1	RS Berkane	Tanger
22:00 UTC	Chaina (yellow card) 81'	Report	Lamlioui 44' (red card) 53'; El Moussaoui (yellow card) 90+7'	Stadium: Village Ziaten Stadium; Referee: Abderrahim Arrakhiz

=== Excellence Cup ===
==== Group stage ====
===== Group D =====
Pos	Team	Pld	W	D	L	GF	GA	GD	Pts	Qualification	SM	UTS	RAC	IRT
1	Stade Marocain	6	5	0	1	9	4	+5	15	Advance to Round of 16	—	2–1	2–1	1–0
2	US Touarga	6	3	2	1	12	7	+5	11	Advance to Round of 16	2–1	—	2–2	4–1
3	RA Casablanca	6	2	2	2	11	11	0	8		0–2	1–1	—	3–1
4	IR Tanger	6	0	0	6	5	15	−10	0		0–1	0–2	3–4	—

Updated to match(es) played on 19 March 2025. Source: kooora
Rules for classification: 1) Points; 2) Goal difference; 3) Goals scored.

4 September 2024 1	Stade Marocain	1–0	IR Tanger	Rabat
17:00 UTC+1	Goal	Report		Stadium: Stade Ahmed Achhoud

8 September 2024 2	RA Casablanca	3–1	IR Tanger	Casablanca
18:00 UTC+1	51'; 83'; 87'	Report	Cheffani 90+4'	Stadium: Père Jégo Stadium

10 October 2024 3	IR Tanger	0–2	US Touarga	Tétouan
20:00 UTC+1		Report	41'; 82'	Stadium: Saniat Rmel Stadium; Attendance: 0

14 October 2024 4	IR Tanger	0–1	Stade Marocain	Tétouan
20:00 UTC+1		Report	38'	Stadium: Saniat Rmel Stadium; Attendance: 0

1 February 2025 5	IR Tanger	3–4	RA Casablanca	Tanger
15:00 UTC+1	El Wahabi 22', 27'; Moutaouali 30' (pen.)	Report	35'; 50'; 60'; 70'	Stadium: Village Ziaten Stadium

19 March 2025 6	US Touarga	4–1	IR Tanger	Khemisset
22:00 UTC	Berqi 4'; Chemlal 21'; Dahmani 45+2'; Housni 75'	Report	Koté 44'	Stadium: 18 November Stadium

== Statistics ==
=== Squad appearances and goals ===
Last updated on 11 May 2025.

No.	Pos	Nat	Player	Total		Botola		Throne Cup		Excellence Cup	
No.	Pos	Nat	Player	Apps	Goals	Apps	Goals	Apps	Goals	Apps	Goals
Goalkeepers
1	GK	(Morocco) MAR	Amine El Ouaad	15	-20	14	(-19)	1	(-1)	0	(0)
12	GK	(Morocco) MAR	Rayan Azouagh	7	-11	2+3	(-4)	0	(0)	2	(-7)
26	GK	(Morocco) MAR	Yassin El Hachloufi	2	-3	0	(0)	0	(0)	2	(-3)
73	GK	(Morocco) MAR	Youssef Laghzal	8	-12	5+1	(-7)	0	(0)	2	(-5)
Defenders
2	DF	(Morocco) MAR	Youssef Chaina	20	1	12+7	1	1	0	0	0
3	DF	(Morocco) MAR	Badr Gaddarine	7	0	3+3	0	0	0	1	0
4	DF	(Morocco) MAR	Mohamed Saoud	12	1	9+3	1	0	0	0	0
13	DF	(Morocco) MAR	Oussama Al Aiz	25	0	18+6	0	1	0	0	0
15	DF	(Morocco) MAR	Ayoub Jarfi	21	0	18+3	0	0	0	0	0
22	DF	(Morocco) MAR	Zakaria Kiani	23	0	23	0	0	0	0	0
23	DF	(Morocco) MAR	Anass Lamrabat	21	0	12+9	0	0	0	0	0
24	DF	(Spain) ESP	Akram El Wahabi	8	2	1+2	0	0	0	5	2
31	DF	(Algeria) ALG	Walid Bencherifa	29	0	28	0	1	0	0	0
36	DF	(Morocco) MAR	Mohammed Ayman Ahaytaf	3	0	0	0	0	0	3	0
44	DF	(Morocco) MAR	Adil Garnan	1	0	0	0	0	0	1	0
46	DF	(Morocco) MAR	Salmane Achiban	1	0	0	0	0	0	1	0
77	DF	(Morocco) MAR	Bilal El Ouadghiri	14	1	13	1	1	0	0	0
Midfielders
5	MF	(Morocco) MAR	Mohsine Moutaouali	16	6	10+4	5	1	0	1	1
6	MF	(Morocco) MAR	Nouaman Aarab	18	0	11+7	0	0	0	0	0
8	MF	(Morocco) MAR	Abdelmottalib Faouzi	28	3	24+3	3	1	0	0	0
16	MF	(Morocco) MAR	Ahmed Chentouf	0	0	0	0	0	0	0	0
17	MF	(Morocco) MAR	Abdelhamid Maâli	29	0	20+8	0	0+1	0	0	0
20	MF	(Morocco) MAR	Ennama El Bellali	14	0	11+2	0	0+1	0	0	0
21	MF	(Morocco) MAR	Hamza Moudene	13	0	8+3	0	1	0	1	0
29	MF	(France) FRA	Adam Darazi	5	0	0+4	0	0	0	1	0
33	MF	(Morocco) MAR	Salaheddine Cheffani	7	1	0+4	0	0	0	3	1
34	MF	(Morocco) MAR	Mohamed El Guartit	1	4	0+1	0	0	4	0	
38	MF	(Morocco) MAR	Noureddine Benfakir	3	0	0	0	0	0	3	0
39	MF	(Morocco) MAR	Yahya Zekri	0	0	0	0	0	0	0	0
43	MF	(Morocco) MAR	Mouad Frizit	1	0	0+1	0	0	0	0	0
47	MF	(Morocco) MAR	Omar Barrak Belakhdar	2	0	0	0	0	0	2	0
48	MF	(Morocco) MAR	Achraf El Quaraoui	2	0	0	0	0	0	2	0
49	MF	(Morocco) MAR	Louay El Moussaoui	5	0	0+2	0	0	0	3	0
50	MF	(Morocco) MAR	Youssef Ezzarradi	3	0	0	0	0	0	3	0
62	MF	(Morocco) MAR	Saad El Kaddouri	1	0	0	0	0	0	1	0
78	MF	(Ivory Coast) CIV	Siriki Sanogo	3	0	1+1	0	0	0	1	0
Forwards
14	FW	(Morocco) MAR	Haitam El Bahja	16	4	11+3	4	1	0	1	0
18	FW	(Morocco) MAR	Hamza El Wasti	27	7	23+3	7	1	0	0	0
19	FW	(Morocco) MAR	Jawad Ghabra	19	5	17+1	5	0+1	0	0	0
27	FW	(Morocco) MAR	Soulaimane Ait Dani	5	0	0+1	0	0	0	4	0
30	FW	(Morocco) MAR	Ali El Harrak	17	6	17	6	0	0	0	0
45	FW	(Morocco) MAR	Marwane Lahbouri	3	0	0	0	0	0	3	0
75	FW	(Senegal) SEN	Moussa Koté	2	1	0+1	0	0	0	1	1
96	FW	(France) FRA	Livty Kpolo	12	0	0+10	0	1	0	1	0
99	FW	(Belgium) BEL	Zakaria Bakkali	13	1	2+10	1	0+1	0	0	0
Players who have made an appearance or had a squad number this season but have left the club
72	GK	(Morocco) MAR	Badreddine Benachour	9	-7	9	(-7)	0	(0)	0	(0)
35	FW	(Morocco) MAR	Mohammed Moujahid	14	0	1+11	0	0	0	2	0

=== Goalscorers ===
Rank	No.	Pos	Nat	Name	Botola	Throne Cup	Excellence Cup	Total
1	30	FW	(Morocco)	Ali El Harrak	7	0	0	7
1	18	FW	(Morocco)	Hamza El Wasti	7	0	0	7
3	5	MF	(Morocco)	Mohsine Moutaouali	5	0	1	6
4	19	FW	(Morocco)	Jawad Ghabra	5	0	0	5
5	14	FW	(Belgium)	Haitam El Bahja	4	0	0	4
6	8	MF	(Morocco)	Abdelmottalib Faouzi	3	0	0	3
7	24	DF	(Morocco)	Akram El Wahabi	0	0	2	2
8	2	DF	(Morocco)	Youssef Chaina	1	0	0	1
8	4	DF	(Morocco)	Mohamed Saoud	1	0	0	1
8	99	FW	(Belgium)	Zakaria Bakkali	1	0	0	1
8	77	DF	(Morocco)	Bilal El Ouadghiri	1	0	0	1
8	33	MF	(Morocco)	Salaheddine Cheffani	0	0	1	1
8	75	FW	(Senegal)	Moussa Koté	0	0	1	1
TOTAL					35	0	5	40

=== Assists ===
Rank	No.	Pos	Nat	Name	Botola	Throne Cup	Excellence Cup	Total
1	23	DF	(Morocco)	Anass Lamrabat	4	0	0	4
1	5	MF	(Morocco)	Mohsine Moutaouali	4	0	0	4
3	6	MF	(Morocco)	Nouaman Aarab	2	0	0	2
3	19	FW	(Morocco)	Jawad Ghabra	2	0	0	2
3	99	FW	(Belgium)	Zakaria Bakkali	2	0	0	2
3	8	MF	(Morocco)	Abdelmottalib Faouzi	2	0	0	2
3	14	FW	(Morocco)	Haitam El Bahja	2	0	0	2
3	18	FW	(Morocco)	Hamza El Wasti	2	0	0	2
3	96	FW	(France)	Livty Kpolo	1	0	1	2
3	17	MF	(Morocco)	Abdelhamid Maâli	2	0	0	2
11	4	DF	(Morocco)	Mohamed Saoud	1	0	0	1
11	40	FW	(Morocco)	Ali El Harrak	1	0	0	1
11	31	DF	(Algeria)	Walid Bencherifa	1	0	0	1
TOTAL					26	0	1	27

=== Clean sheets ===
Last updated on 11 May 2025.

No	Name	Botola	Coupe du Trône	Excellence Cup	Total
1	(Morocco) El Ouaad	3/14	0/1	0/0	3/15
12	(Morocco) Azouagh	0/3	0/0	0/2	0/5
26	(Morocco) El Hachloufi	0/0	0/0	0/2	0/2
73	(Morocco) Laghzal	1/6	0/0	0/1	1/7
~~72~~	(Morocco) Benachour	3/9	0/0	0/0	3/9
Total		7/30	0/1	0/6	7/37

=== Disciplinary record ===
N	P	Nat.	Name	Botola			Coupe du Trône			Excellence Cup			Total			Notes
N	P	Nat.	Name	Yellow card	Second yellow card	Red card	Yellow card	Second yellow card	Red card	Yellow card	Second yellow card	Red card	Yellow card	Second yellow card	Red card	Notes
1	GK	(Morocco)	Amine El Ouaad	2									2			
2	DF	(Morocco)	Youssef Chaina	5		1	1						6		1	
4	DF	(Morocco)	Mohamed Saoud	4									4			
5	MF	(Morocco)	Mohsine Moutaouali	3									3			
6	MF	(Morocco)	Nouaman Aarab	2									2			
8	MF	(Morocco)	Abdelmottalib Faouzi	4		1							4		1	
12	GK	(Morocco)	Rayan Azouagh	1									1			
13	DF	(Morocco)	Oussama Al Aiz	4		1							4		1	
14	FW	(Morocco)	Haitam El Bahja	2									2			
15	DF	(Morocco)	Ayoub Jarfi	7									7			
17	MF	(Morocco)	Abdelhamid Maâli	6									6			
18	FW	(Morocco)	Hamza El Wasti	3									3			
19	FW	(Morocco)	Jawad Ghabra	5									5			
20	MF	(Morocco)	Ennama El Bellali	3									3			
21	MF	(Morocco)	Hamza Moudene	2									2			
22	DF	(Morocco)	Zakaria Kiani	4									4			
23	DF	(Morocco)	Anass Lamrabat	4									4			
24	DF	(Morocco)	Akram El Wahabi	1									1			
27	MF	(Morocco)	Soulaimane Ait Dani	1									1			
30	FW	(Morocco)	Ali El Harrak	2									2			
31	DF	(Algeria)	Walid Bencherifa	7									7			
35	FW	(Morocco)	Mohammed Moujahid	1									1			
73	GK	(Morocco)	Youssef Laghzal	1									1			
77	DF	(Morocco)	Bilal El Ouadghiri	3									3			
99	FW	(Belgium)	Zakaria Bakkali	2									2			
~~72~~	GK	(Morocco)	Badreddine Benachour	2	1								2	1		

Last updated: 8 May 2025
Source: kooora.com
Only competitive matches
(yellow card) = Number of bookings; (second yellow card) = Number of sending offs after a second yellow card; (red card) = Number of sending offs by a direct red card.

=== Injury record ===
N	P	Nat.	Name	Type	Status	Source	Match	Inj. Date	Ret. Date
72	GK	(Morocco)	Badreddine Benachour	Left hip labrum stretch			vs Wydad AC	9 November 2024	9 January 2025
38	MF	(Morocco)	Noureddine Benfakir	Acute right ankle sprain			vs US Touarga	19 March 2025	

- Player is injured
- Player has recovered from injury
Last updated: 20 March 2025
Source: clubirt

== See also ==
- 2015–16 IR Tanger season
- 2016–17 IR Tanger season
- 2017–18 IR Tanger season
- 2018–19 IR Tanger season
- 2019–20 IR Tanger season
- 2020–21 IR Tanger season
- 2021–22 IR Tanger season
- 2022–23 IR Tanger season
- 2023–24 IR Tanger season
