= Subdivisions of Marrakesh =

Marrakesh, the regional capital, forms a prefecture-level administrative unit of Morocco, divided into Marrakesh-Medina, Marrakesh-Menara and Sidi Youssef Ben Ali, which form part of the region of Marrakesh-Tensift-El Haouz along with Al Haouz Province, Chichaoua Province, El Kelâat Es-Sraghna Province, and Essaouira Province. In turn, the prefecture of Marrakech is divided administratively into the following:

Name	Geographic code	Type	Households	Population (2004)	Foreign population	Moroccan population	Notes
Mechouar Kasba	351.01.01.	Municipality	4548	22111	48	22063	
Annakhil/Ennakhil	351.01.03.	Arrondissement	10968	54111	233	53878	
Gueliz	351.01.05.	Arrondissement	37030	173101	2135	170966	
Marrakech-Medina	351.01.07.	Arrondissement	35929	167233	361	166872	
Menara	351.01.09.	Arrondissement	57403	281663	568	281095	
Sidi Youssef Ben Ali	351.01.11.	Arrondissement	23776	124935	34	124901	
Alouidane	351.03.01.	Rural commune	3794	20925	51	20874	
Harbil	351.03.03.	Rural commune	2893	17007	0	17007	
M'Nabha	351.03.05.	Rural commune	1895	11755	1	11754	1365 residents live in the center, called Kattara; 10390 residents live in rural areas.
Ouahat Sidi Brahim	351.03.07.	Rural commune	2561	13686	18	13668	
Oulad Hassoune	351.03.09.	Rural commune	3504	19188	26	19162	
Ouled Dlim	351.03.11.	Rural commune	2093	14747	0	14747	
Agafay	351.05.01.	Rural commune	1892	11079	1	11078	
Ait Imour	351.05.03.	Rural commune	1994	12164	0	12164	
Loudaya	351.05.05.	Rural commune	4770	26999	13	26986	8989 residents live in the center, called Loudaya; 18010 residents live in rural areas.
Saada	351.05.07.	Rural commune	7206	39071	17	39054	
Sid Zouine	351.05.09.	Rural commune	2189	11631	5	11626	10067 residents live in the center, called Sid Zouin; 1564 residents live in rural areas.
Souihla	351.05.11.	Rural commune	3321	19295	2	19293	
Tassoultante	351.05.13.	Rural commune	6062	30137	32	30105	

== Neighbourhoods of Marrakech ==
Neighbourhoods of the city include: Bab Ghmat, Arset El Baraka, Arset Moulay Bouaza, Djane Ben Chogra, Arset El Houta, Bab Aylan, Arset Sidi Youssef, Derb Chtouka, Bab Hmar, Bab Agnaou, Quartier Jnan Laafia, Toureg, Kasbah, Mellah, Arset El Maach, Arset Moulay Moussa, Riad Zitoun Jdid, Kennaria, Rahba Kedima, Kaat Benahid, Zaouiat Lahdar, El Moukef, Riad Laarous, Assouel, Kechich, Douar Fekhara, Arset Tihiri, Sidi Ben Slimane El Jazouli, Diour Jdad, Rmila, Zaouia Sidi Rhalem, Kbour Chou, Ain Itti, Bab Doukkala, El Hara, and Arset El Bilk.
