= Touggana =

- Village
- Location within Morocco
- Coordinates: 31°33′3″N 7°58′8″W
- Country: Morocco
- Region: Marrakesh-Safi
- Province: Al Haouz Province
- Time zone: UTC+0 (GMT)

Touggana is a village in Al Haouz Province of the Marrakesh-Safi region of Morocco. It is a southern suburb of Marrakesh, just east of Lahebichate.
