= Lagouassem =

- Village
- Location within Morocco
- Coordinates: 31°33′37″N 7°58′49″W
- Country: Morocco
- Region: Marrakesh-Safi
- Province: Al Haouz Province
- Time zone: UTC+0 (GMT)

Lagouassem is a village in Al Haouz Province of the Marrakesh-Safi region of Morocco. It is a southern suburb of Marrakesh, just south of Lahebichate.
