= Skhour Rhamna =

Skhour Rhamna صخور الرحامنة
- Rural commune and town
- The main street on 08/09/2026
- Interactive map of Skhour Rhamna
- Coordinates: 32.4833°N 7.91667°W
- Country: Morocco
- Region: Marrakesh-Tensift-El Haouz
- Province: Rhamna Province

Population (2004)
  - Total: 14,346
- Time zone: UTC+0 (GMT)

Skhour Rhamna is a small town (alternatively Skhour Rehamna) and rural commune formerly in El Kelâat Es-Sraghna Province of the former Marrakesh-Tensift-El Haouz region of Morocco, now in Rehamna Province in Marrakesh-Safi region of Morocco. At the time of the 2004 census, the commune had a total population of 14346 people living in 2438 households. The town had a population of 4,352.
