= Sidi Ghanem, Rehamna Province =

Sidi Ghanem
- Rural commune and town
- Location within Morocco
- Coordinates: 32.80°N 8.01°W
- Country: Morocco
- Region: Marrakesh-Safi
- Province: Rehamna

Population (2014)
  - Total: 10,099
- Time zone: UTC+0 (GMT)

Sidi Ghanem is a small town and rural commune in Rehamna Province of the Marrakesh-Safi region of Morocco. At the time of the 2014 census, the commune had a total population of 10,099 people living in 1636 households. At the time of the 2004 census, when it was part of to El Kelâat Es-Sraghna Province, the commune had a total population of 12,159 people living in 1799 households.
