= Fraita =

Fraita ⴼⵕⴰⵢⵟⴰ الفرائطة
- Location in Morocco
- Coordinates: 31°55′N 7°15′W
- Country: Morocco
- Region: Marrakesh-Safi
- Province: El Kelâa des Sraghna

Population (2014)
  - Total: 11,298
- Time zone: UTC+0 (GMT)
- Postal code: 43124
- Website: https://commune-fraita.ma

Fraita (Berber: ⴼⵕⴰⵢⵟⴰ) is a city in Morocco located 21 km (13 mi) to the southeast of the city of El Kelaa des Sraghna. In the 2014 Moroccan census it recorded a population of 11,298.
