= Oulad El Garne =

- Rural commune and town
- Location within Morocco
- Coordinates: 32.1289°N 7.3474°W
- Country: Morocco
- Region: Marrakesh-Safi
- Province: El Kelâat Es-Sraghna

Population (2004)
  - Total: 6,174
- Time zone: UTC+0 (GMT)

Oulad El Garne is a small town and rural commune in El Kelâat Es-Sraghna Province of the Marrakesh-Safi region of Morocco. At the time of the 2004 census, the commune had a total population of 6174 people living in 1069 households.
