= Sidi Boubker, Rehamna Province =

Coordinates: 31°49′44″N 7°42′30″W

Sidi Boubker
- Rural commune and town
- Interactive map of Sidi Boubker
- Country: Morocco
- Region: Marrakesh-Safi
- Province: Rehamna

Population (2004)
  - Total: 6,398
- Time zone: UTC+0 (GMT)

Sidi Boubker is a small town and rural commune in Rehamna Province, Morocco. At the time of the 2004 census, the commune had a total population of 6398 people living in 926 households.
