= Zemrane Charqia =

- Rural commune and town
- Location within Morocco
- Coordinates: 31°44′43.2″N 7°23′22.86″W
- Country: Morocco
- Region: Marrakesh-Safi
- Province: El Kelâat Es-Sraghna

Population (2004)
  - Total: 27,415
- Time zone: UTC+0 (GMT)

Zemrane Charqia is a small town and rural commune in El Kelâat Es-Sraghna Province of the Marrakesh-Safi region of Morocco. At the time of the 2004 census, the commune had a total population of 27,415 people living in 4198 households.
