= Oulad Imloul =

Coordinates: 32°02′N 7°43′W

- Rural commune and town
- Interactive map of Oulad Imloul
- Country: Morocco
- Region: Marrakesh-Safi
- Province: Rehamna

Population (2004)
  - Total: 9,641
- Time zone: UTC+0 (GMT)

Oulad Imloul is a small town and rural commune in Rehamna Province of the Marrakesh-Safi region of Morocco. At the time of the 2004 census, the commune had a total population of 9641 people living in 1465 households.
