= Laattaouia =

El Attaouia العطاوية (Arabic)
- City
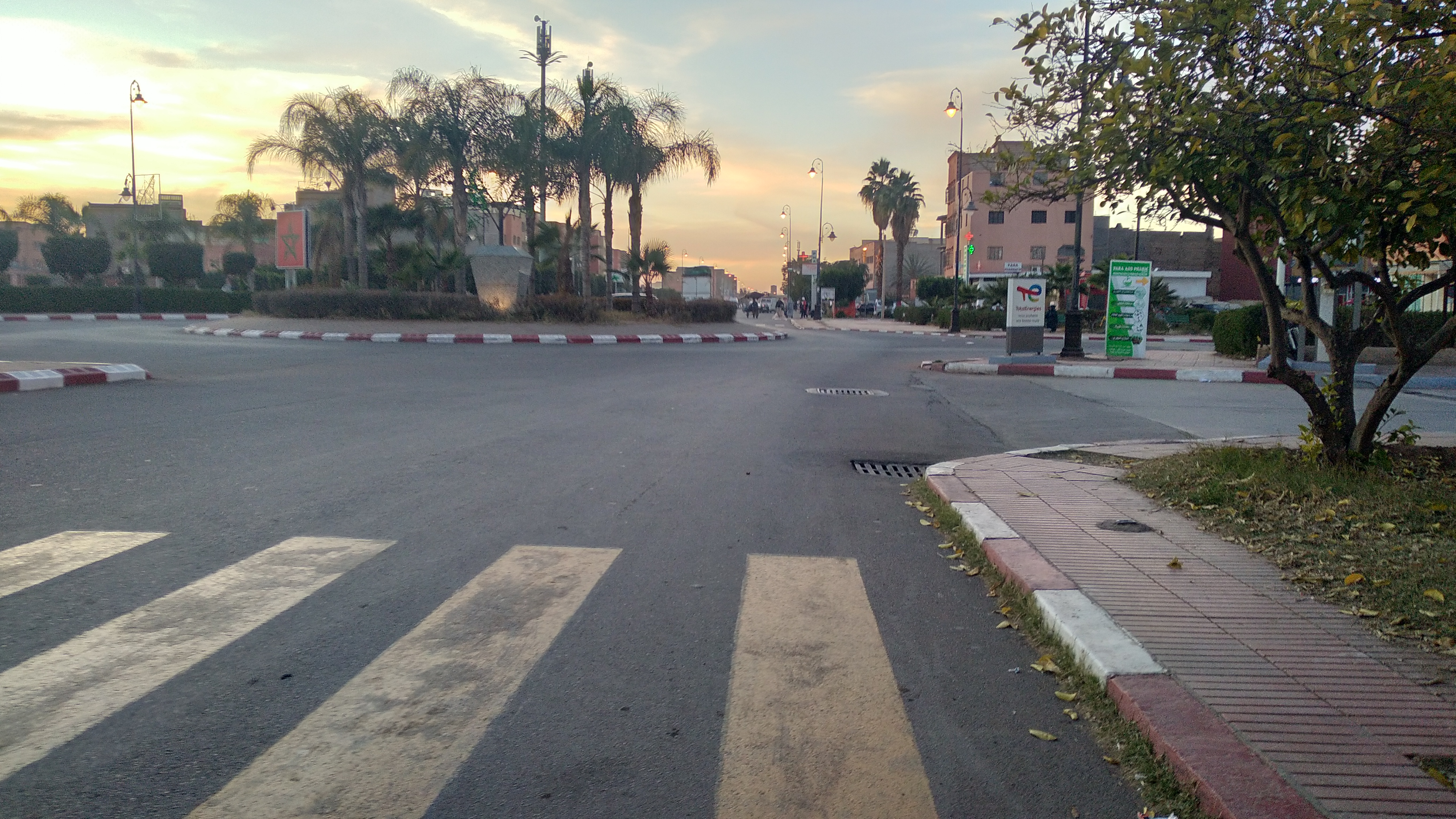
- Interactive map of El Attaouia
- Coordinates: 31°50′05″N 7°18′45″W
- Country: Morocco
- Region: Marrakesh-Safi
- Province: El Kelaa des Sraghna
- Elevation: 626 m (2,054 ft)

Population (2014)
  - Total: 30,315
- Time zone: UTC+0 (GMT)

Laattaouia or El Attaouia is a town in El Kelaa des Sraghna Province, Marrakesh-Safi, Morocco. According to the 2014 census it has a population of 30,315.
