= Bourrous =

- Rural commune and town
- Interactive map of Bourrous
- Country: Morocco
- Region: Marrakesh-Safi
- Province: Rehamna

Population (2004)
  - Total: 5,748
- Time zone: UTC+0 (GMT)

Bourrous is a small town and rural commune in Rehamna Province of the Marrakesh-Safi region of Morocco. At the time of the 2004 census, the commune had a total population of 5748 people living in 904 households.
