= Sour El Aaz =

Sour El Aaz Sour Elaiz
- Rural commune and town
- Location within Morocco
- Coordinates: 31.83°N 7.03°W
- Country: Morocco
- Region: Marrakesh-Safi
- Province: El Kelâat Es-Sraghna

Population (2004)
  - Total: 3,901
- Time zone: UTC+0 (GMT)

Sour El Aaz is a small town and rural commune in El Kelâat Es-Sraghna Province of the Marrakesh-Safi region of Morocco. At the time of the 2004 census, the commune had a total population of 3901 people living in 684 households.
