= Oulad Hassoune Hamri =

- Rural commune and town
- Interactive map of Oulad Hassoune Hamri
- Country: Morocco
- Region: Marrakesh-Safi
- Province: Rehamna

Population (2004)
  - Total: 8,554
- Time zone: UTC+0 (GMT)

Oulad Hassoune Hamri is a small town and rural commune in Rehamna Province of the Marrakesh-Safi region of Morocco. At the time of the 2004 census, the commune had a total population of 8554 people living in 1228 households.

There is very little rainfall throughout the year, an average of 288mm this is referred to as a local steppe climate. The average temperature is 17.7 °C.
