= Chtaiba =

Coordinates: 32°12′N 7°18′W

- Rural commune and town
- Interactive map of Chtaiba
- Country: Morocco
- Region: Marrakesh-Safi
- Province: El Kelâat Es-Sraghna

Population (2004)
  - Total: 7,874
- Time zone: UTC+0 (GMT)

Chtaiba is a small town and rural commune in El Kelâat Es-Sraghna Province of the Marrakesh-Safi region of Morocco. At the time of the 2004 census, the commune had a total population of 7874 people living in 1246 households.
