= Jaafra =

Municipality in Marrakesh-Safi, Morocco

Coordinates: 31°30′52.2″N 8°45′19.92″W

- Rural commune and town
- Interactive map of Jaafra
- Country: Morocco
- Region: Marrakesh-Safi
- Province: Rehamna

Population (2004)
  - Total: 10,060
- Time zone: UTC+0 (GMT)

Jaafra is a small town and rural commune in Rehamna Province of the Marrakesh-Safi region of Morocco. At the time of the 2004 census, the commune had a total population of 10060 people living in 1389 households.
