= Sidi Ali Labrahla =

Sidi Ali Labrahla سيدي علي البراحلة
- Rural commune and town
- Interactive map of Sidi Ali Labrahla سيدي علي البراحلة
- Country: Morocco
- Region: Marrakesh-Safi
- Province: Rehamna

Population (2004)
  - Total: 6,894
- Time zone: UTC+0 (GMT)

Sidi Ali Labrahla سيدي علي البراحلة is a small town and rural commune in Rehamna Province of the Marrakesh-Safi region of Morocco. At the time of the 2004 census, the commune had a total population of 6894 people living in 1099 households.
