= Sidi Rahhal =

Sidi Rahhal سيدي رحال
- Town
- Location in Morocco
- Coordinates: 31°40′N 7°29′W
- Country: Morocco
- Region: Marrakesh-Safi
- Province: El Kelaa des Sraghna
- Elevation: 640 m (2,100 ft)

Population (2014)
  - Total: 9,906
- Time zone: UTC+0 (GMT)

Sidi Rahhal is a town in El Kelaa des Sraghna Province, Marrakesh-Safi, Morocco. According to the 2014 census it had a population of 9906.

The monastery of Tazert is situated in the vicinity of the town, close to the village of Tazert.
