= Loued Lakhdar =

- Rural commune and town
- Location within Morocco
- Coordinates: 31.85°N 7.09°W
- Country: Morocco
- Region: Marrakesh-Safi
- Province: El Kelâat Es-Sraghna

Population (2004)
  - Total: 9,362
- Time zone: UTC+0 (GMT)

Loued Lakhdar is a small town and rural commune in El Kelâat Es-Sraghna Province of the Marrakesh-Safi region of Morocco. At the time of the 2004 census, the commune had a population of 9,362 living in 1,469 households.
