= Oulad Aarrad =

Oulad Aarrad Oulad Ayad
- Rural commune and town
- Location within Morocco
- Coordinates: 31.875°N 7.42167°W
- Country: Morocco
- Region: Marrakesh-Safi
- Province: El Kelâat Es-Sraghna

Area
  - Total: 45.8 km^{2} (17.7 sq mi)
- Elevation: 581 m (1,906 ft)

Population (2004)
  - Total: 6,491
- Time zone: UTC+0 (GMT)

Oulad Aarrad is a small town and rural commune in El Kelâat Es-Sraghna Province of the Marrakesh-Safi region of Morocco. At the time of the 2004 census, the commune had a total population of 6,491 people living in 1,002 households. It has a Human Development Index of 0.647.
