= Sidi Mansour, Morocco =

Sidi Mansour
- Rural commune and town
- Interactive map of Sidi Mansour
- Country: Morocco
- Region: Marrakesh-Safi
- Province: Rehamna

Population (2004)
  - Total: 6,318
- Time zone: UTC+0 (GMT)

Sidi Mansour is a small town and rural commune in Rehamna Province, Morocco. At the time of the 2004 census, the commune had a total population of 6318 people living in 928 households.
