= Ait Taleb =

- Rural commune and town
- Location within Morocco
- Coordinates: 32°23′02″N 8°11′08″W
- Country: Morocco
- Region: Marrakesh-Safi
- Province: Rehamna

Population (2004)
  - Total: 8,888
- Time zone: UTC+0 (GMT)

Ait Taleb is a small town and rural commune in Rehamna Province of the Marrakesh-Safi region of Morocco. At the time of the 2004 census, the commune had a total population of 8888 people living in 1308 households.
