= Cherki =

Cherki (Arabic: شرقي) is an Arabic word meaning "eastern", or "oriental".

Cherki may also refer to:

== People ==
- Alice Cherki (born 1936), Algerian psychoanalyst.
- Oury Amos Cherki (born 1959), French-Israeli rabbi.
- Pascal Cherki (born 1966), French politician.
- Rayan Cherki (born 2003), French footballer.

== Place ==
- Oulad Cherki, a small town in Morocco.

== Other ==
- Variant spelling of Ceki - a card game deck
