= Tlauh =

- Rural commune and town
- Location within Morocco
- Coordinates: 31.8153°N 7.6057°W
- Country: Morocco
- Region: Marrakesh-Safi
- Province: Rehamna

Population (2004)
  - Total: 9,907
- Time zone: UTC+0 (GMT)

Tlauh is a small town and rural commune in Rehamna Province of the Marrakesh-Safi region of Morocco. At the time of the 2004 census, the commune had a total population of 9907 people living in 1529 households.
