= Tamallalt =

Tamallalt تملالت ⵜⴰⵎⵍⵍⴰⵍⵜ
- City
- Interactive map of Tamallalt
- Coordinates: 31°49′44″N 7°31′34″W
- Country: Morocco
- Region: Marrakesh-Safi
- Province: El Kelaa des Sraghna
- Elevation: 585 m (1,919 ft)

Population (2024)
  - Total: 20,528
- Time zone: UTC+0 (GMT)

Tamallalt is a city in El Kelaa des Sraghna Province, Marrakesh-Safi, Morocco. According to the 2024 census it had a population of 20,528.
