= Skoura Lhadra =

- Rural commune and town
- Location within Morocco
- Coordinates: 32.4657°N 7.7225°W
- Country: Morocco
- Region: Marrakesh-Safi
- Province: Rehamna

Population (2004)
  - Total: 8,942
- Time zone: UTC+0 (GMT)

Skoura Lhadra is a small town and rural commune in Rehamna Province of the Marrakesh-Safi region of Morocco. At the time of the 2004 census, the commune had a total population of 8942 people living in 1224 households.
