= Jbilate =

- Rural commune and town
- Interactive map of Jbilate
- Country: Morocco
- Region: Marrakesh-Safi
- Province: Rehamna

Population (2014)
  - Total: 11,234
- Time zone: UTC+0 (GMT)

Jbilate is a small town and rural commune in Rehamna Province of the Marrakesh-Safi region of Morocco. At the time of the 2014 census, the commune had a total population of 11234 people living in 2002 households.
