= Abdellatif Meftah =

French long-distance runner (born 1982)

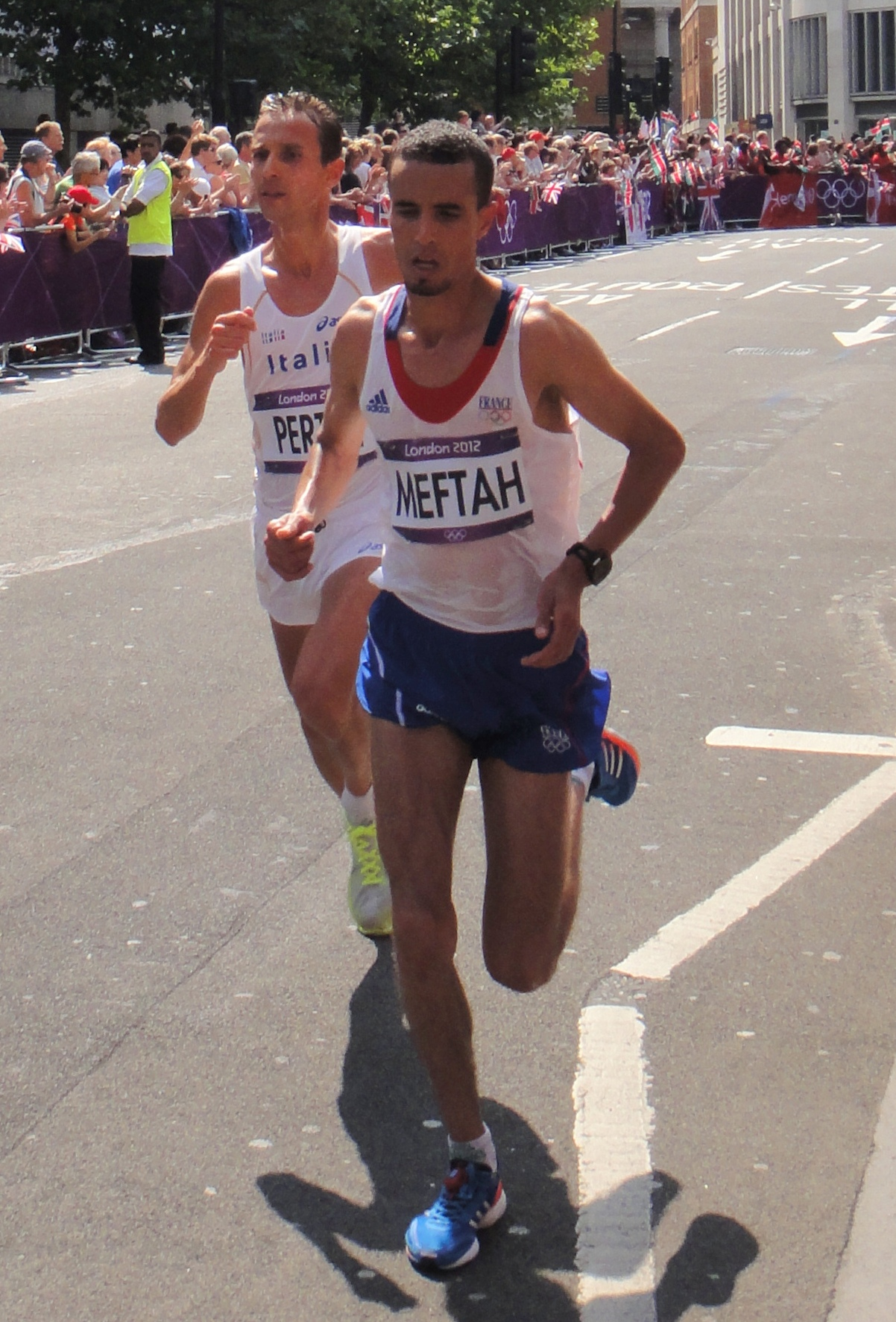

Personal information
- Born: 3 January 1982 (age 43)
- Height: 1.73 m (5 ft 8 in)
- Weight: 59 kg (130 lb)

Sport
- Country: France
- Sport: Athletics
- Event: Marathon

Abdellatif Meftah (born 3 January 1982 in Bouchane, Morocco) is a French long-distance runner.

He ran for Morocco at the Pan Arab Games and won a gold medal in the half marathon for his home nation. Transferring his nationality, Meftah represented France at the 2010 IAAF World Cross Country Championships and finished in 40th place. He broke the French record in the half marathon at the Semi-Marathon de Lille in September that year, running a time of 1:00:46 to erase Larbi Zeroual's mark from 1999. At the 2010 European Cross Country Championships he led the French men to the team title, although he just missed out on an individual medal with his fourth-place finish. Meftah moved up a further distance on the roads, making his debut at the 2011 Paris Marathon in April. He was Europe's top finisher at the competition, coming tenth, and completed the course in a time of 2:10:53 hours.

== Achievements ==
Year	Competition	Venue	Position	Event	Notes
Representing Morocco
2004	Pan Arab Games	Algiers, Algeria	1st	Half marathon	1:05:33
Representing France
2010	European Championships	Barcelona, Spain	10th	10,000 m	29:14.74
