= Zemrane =

- Rural commune and town
- Interactive map of Zemrane
- Coordinates: 31.67°N 7.44°W
- Country: Morocco
- Region: Marrakesh-Safi
- Province: El Kelâat Es-Sraghna

Population (2004)
  - Total: 15,996
- Time zone: UTC+0 (GMT)

Zemrane is a small town and rural commune in El Kelâat Es-Sraghna Province of the Marrakesh-Safi region of Morocco. At the time of the 2004 census, the commune had a total population of 15,996 people living in 2477 households.
