= Assahrij =

- Town
- Location in Morocco
- Coordinates: 31°48′00″N 7°08′24″W
- Country: Morocco
- Region: Marrakech-Safi
- Province: El Kelaa des Sraghna

Population (2004)
  - Total: 1,732
- Time zone: UTC+0 (GMT)

Assahrij is a town in El Kelaa des Sraghna Province, Marrakech-Safi, Morocco. According to the 2004 census it has a population of 1,732.
