= Labrikiyne =

- Rural commune and town
- Location within Morocco
- Coordinates: 32°17′40″N 8°04′20″W
- Country: Morocco
- Region: Marrakesh-Safi
- Province: Rehamna

Population (2004)
  - Total: 13,225
- Time zone: UTC+0 (GMT)

Labrikiyne is a small town and rural commune in Rehamna Province of the Marrakesh-Safi region of Morocco. At the time of the 2004 census, the commune had a population of 13,225, in 2,104 households.
