= Nzalat Laadam =

Town in Marrakesh–Safi, Morocco

Coordinates: 32°06′N 7°57′W

- Rural commune and town
- Interactive map of Nzalat Laadam
- Country: Morocco
- Region: Marrakesh-Safi
- Province: Rehamna

Population (2004)
  - Total: 14,651
- Time zone: UTC+0 (GMT)

Nzalat Laadam is a small town and rural commune in Rehamna Province of the Marrakesh-Safi region of Morocco. At the time of the 2004 census, the commune had a total population of 14,651 people living in 1902 households.
