= Ras Ain Rhamna =

- Rural commune and town
- Interactive map of Ras Ain Rhamna
- Country: Morocco
- Region: Marrakesh-Safi
- Province: Rehamna

Population (2004)
  - Total: 12,924
- Time zone: UTC+0 (GMT)

Ras Ain Rhamna is a small town and rural commune in Rehamna Province of the Marrakesh-Safi region of Morocco. At the time of the 2004 census, the commune had a total population of 12,924 people living in 2062 households.
