= Ouargui =

- Rural commune and town
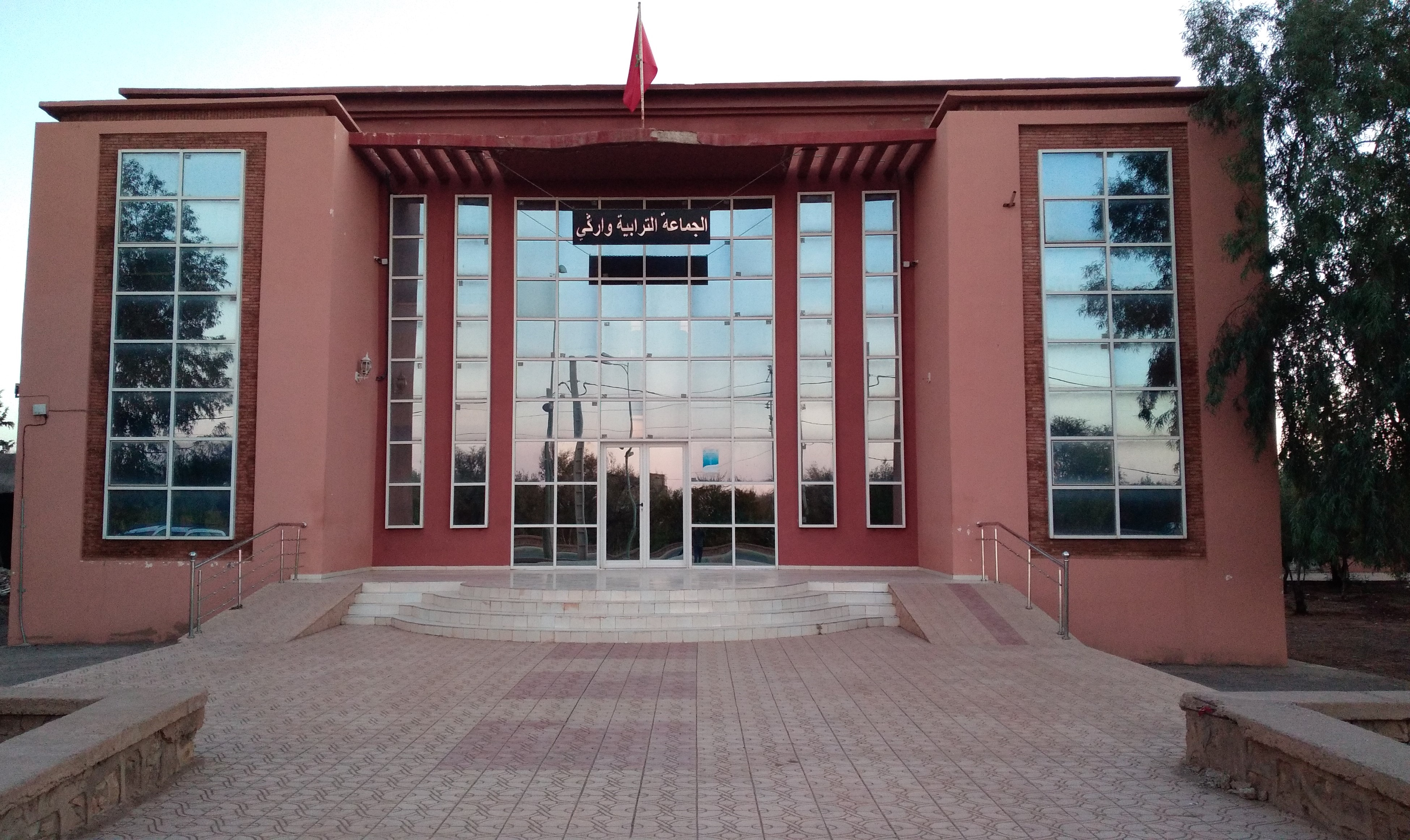
- Interactive map of Ouargui
- Coordinates: 31.82°N 7.22°W
- Country: Morocco
- Region: Marrakesh-Safi
- Province: El Kelâat Es-Sraghna

Population (2004)
  - Total: 10,113
- Time zone: UTC+0 (GMT)

Ouargui is a small town and rural commune in El Kelâat Es-Sraghna Province of the Marrakesh-Safi region of Morocco. At the time of the 2004 census, the commune had a total population of 10,113 people living in 1615 households.
