= Ait Hammou =

- Rural commune and town
- Location within Morocco
- Coordinates: 32.2201°N 8.1967°W
- Country: Morocco
- Region: Marrakesh-Safi
- Province: Rehamna

Government

Population (2004)
  - Total: 7,499
- Time zone: UTC+0 (GMT)

Ait Hammou is a small town and rural commune in Rehamna Province, Marrakesh-Safi, Morocco. At the time of the 2004 census, the commune had a total population of 7499 people living in 1116 households.
