= M'Zem Sanhaja =

- Rural commune and town
- Location within Morocco
- Coordinates: 32.00°N 7.13°W
- Country: Morocco
- Region: Marrakesh-Safi
- Province: El Kelâat Es-Sraghna

Population (2004)
  - Total: 9,253
- Time zone: UTC+0 (GMT)

M'Zem Sanhaja is a small town and rural commune in El Kelâat Es-Sraghna Province of the Marrakesh-Safi region of Morocco. At the time of the 2004 census, the commune had a total population of 9253 people living in 1359 households.
