= Choara =

Choara may refer to:

- Choara (moth)
- Choara, Morocco
- Choara (Parthia)
