= Bouchane =

Coordinates: 32.2800°N 8.3100°W

Bouchane بوشان
- Rural commune and town
- Interactive map of Bouchane
- Country: Morocco
- Region: Marrakesh-Safi
- Province: Rehamna

Population (2004)
  - Total: 9,554
- Time zone: UTC+0 (GMT)

Bouchane is a small town and rural commune in Rehamna Province of the Marrakesh-Safi region of Morocco. At the time of the 2004 census, the commune had a total population of 9,554 people living in 1,535 households.
