= Ouahat Sidi Brahim =

Ouahat Sidi Brahim: واحة سيدي ابراهيم (Arabic); ⵡⴰⵃⵜ ⵙⵉⴷⵉ ⴱⵕⴰⵀⵉⵎ (Berber languages)
- Rural commune and town
- Location within Morocco
- Coordinates: 31°42′50″N 7°59′50″W
- Country: Morocco
- Region: Marrakesh-Safi
- Province: Marrakesh

Population (2014)
  - Total: 25,320
- Time zone: UTC+0 (GMT)

Ouahat Sidi Brahim (Arabic: واحة سيدي ابراهيم) is a town and rural commune in Marrakesh Prefecture of the Marrakesh-Safi region of Morocco. At the time of the 2014 census, the commune had a total population of 25,320 people.

Ouhat Sidi Brahim is located north of Marrakesh, on the right bank of Tensift River, at the foot of the Jbilet massif.
