= Mechouar Kasba =

Mechouar Kasba: المشور القصبة (Arabic); ⵎⵉⵛⵡⴰⵔ ⵇⴰⵚⴱⴰ (Berber languages)
- Municipality and town
- Location within Morocco
- Coordinates: 31°37′25″N 7°59′13″W
- Country: Morocco
- Region: Marrakesh-Safi
- Province: Marrakesh

Population (2014)
  - Total: 16,860
- Time zone: UTC+0 (GMT)

Mechouar Kasba (Arabic: المشور القصبة,) is a town and municipality in Marrakesh Prefecture of the Marrakesh-Safi region of Morocco. At the time of the 2014 census, the commune had a total population of 16,860 people.
