= Kalaat Sraghna =

El Kelaa des Sraghna قلعة السراغنة ⵇⴰⵍⵄⴰⵜ ⵙⵙⵔⴰⵖⵏⴰ
- city
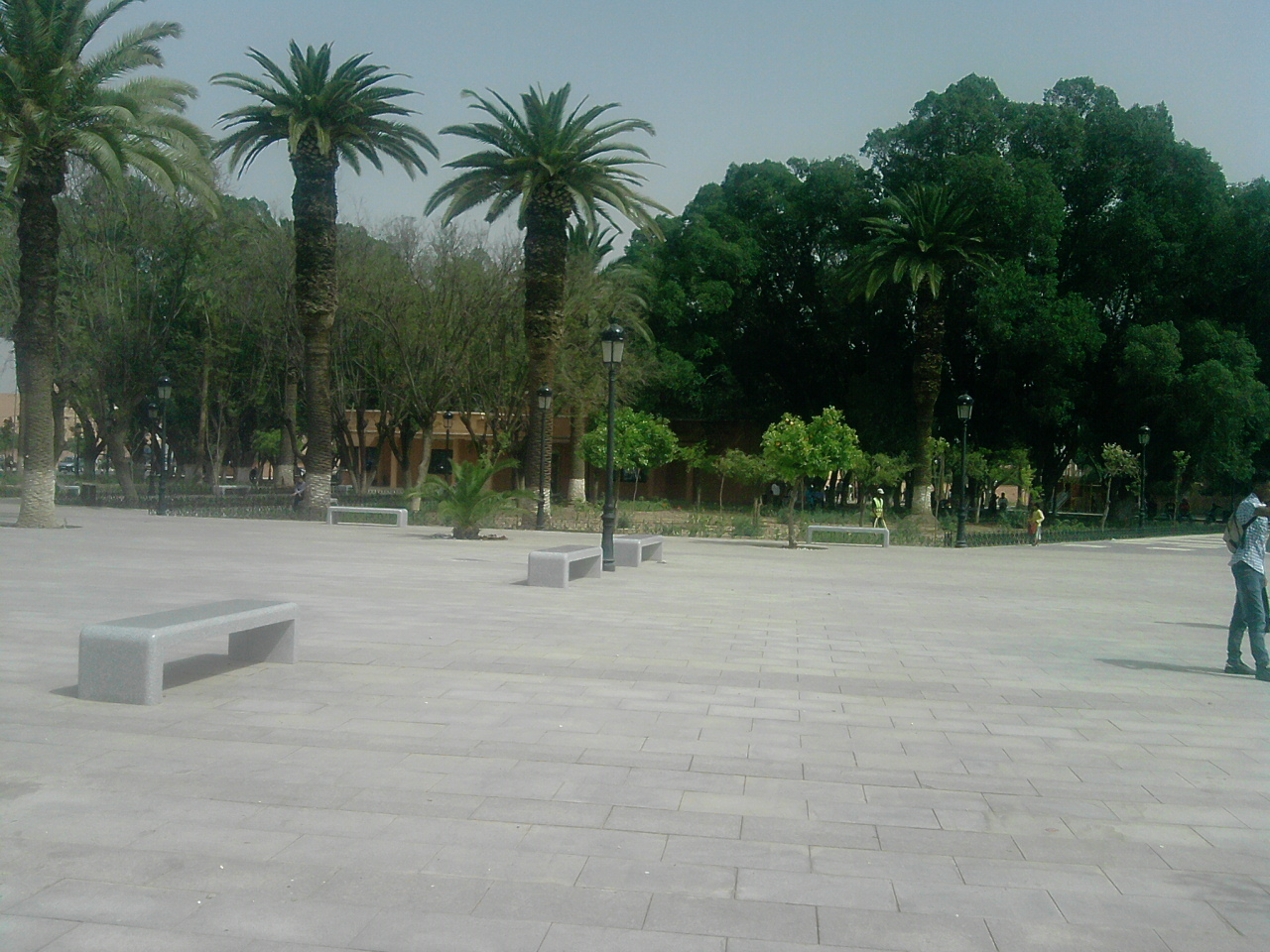
- Interactive map of El Kelaa des Sraghna
- Coordinates: 32°2′53″N 7°24′30″W
- Country: Morocco
- Region: Marrakesh-Safi
- Province: El Kelaa des Sraghna
- Settled: 11th Century

Government
  - Mayor: Noureddine Aït El Haj (USFP)
- Elevation: 400 m (1,300 ft)

Population (2024)
  - Total: 106,418
- Time zone: UTC+0 (GMT)
- Postal code: 43000

Kalaat Sraghna (Arabic: قلعة السراغنة, romanized: qalʿat as-sarāḡina, also Kelaat Sraghna, El Kelaa des Sraghna, or El Kelaa des Srarhna) is a city in central Morocco. The economy of the town is mostly based on agriculture, the growing of olive trees being predominant.

== History ==
According to some historical references, the Alaouite Sultan Moulay Ismail established the city in the 17th century. The Sultan had aimed to found citadels and Quasbas to control the movements of mountainous tribes. Other references state that the existence of the city refers to the period of the Almoravids. According to other sources, the city was known as the Arabs designations such as "Gaynou" Lagrare, and it was founded by the Almoravids as a project to monitor the road between Fes and Marrakesh, to populate the area and fight against Berghouata's heresy. Nevertheless, some manuscripts cite evidence that Saadian Dynasty founded the city in the late the sixteenth century and it was known as the designation "Kelaat Lagrare".

== Climate ==
El Kelaa des Sraghna has a hot semi-arid climate (Köppen climate classification BSh).

Climate data for El Kelaa des Srarhna
| Month | Jan | Feb | Mar | Apr | May | Jun | Jul | Aug | Sep | Oct | Nov | Dec | Year |
|---|---|---|---|---|---|---|---|---|---|---|---|---|---|
| Mean daily maximum °C (°F) | 17 (62) | 19 (67) | 22 (71) | 24 (75) | 29 (84) | 31 (88) | 36 (97) | 37 (98) | 32 (90) | 27 (81) | 22 (71) | 18 (64) | 26 (79) |
| Mean daily minimum °C (°F) | 6 (42) | 7 (45) | 9 (49) | 11 (51) | 14 (57) | 16 (61) | 19 (66) | 19 (67) | 17 (63) | 14 (58) | 11 (51) | 7 (44) | 13 (55) |
| Average precipitation mm (inches) | 28 (1.1) | 30 (1.2) | 28 (1.1) | 20 (0.8) | 7.6 (0.3) | 5.1 (0.2) | 0 (0) | 0 (0) | 7.6 (0.3) | 23 (0.9) | 20 (0.8) | 48 (1.9) | 220 (8.7) |
Source: Weatherbase
