= Douar Lahna =

- Village
- Location within Morocco
- Coordinates: 31°34′21″N 7°58′59″W
- Country: Morocco
- Region: Marrakesh-Safi
- Province: Al Haouz Province
- Time zone: UTC+0 (GMT)

Douar Lahna is a village in Al Haouz Province of the Marrakesh-Safi region of Morocco. It is a southern suburb of Marrakesh.
