= Hamza El Wasti =

French professional footballer

Hamza el Wasti
Personal information
- Date of birth: 25 October 1995 (age 31)
- Place of birth: Morocco
- Position: Forward

Youth career
- –2019: Racing Casablanca

Senior career*
Years	Team	Apps	(Gls)
	Racing Casablanca	20	(1)
2017-2019	Wydad Casablanca	6	(1)
2019-	SCC Mohammédia	49	(1)
- * Club domestic league appearances and goals as of 18 April 2020

Hamza el Wasti is a Moroccan professional footballer who plays as a forward.
