= Excellence Cup =

Moroccan association football league

Excellence Cup كأس التميز
- Organiser(s): LNFP
- Founded: 2024; 2 years ago
- Region: Morocco
- Teams: 32
- Current champions: Olympique Dcheira
- Most championships: Olympique Dcheira (1 title)
- Broadcaster(s): Arryadia; Arryadia Olympics
- Website: lnfp.ma
- 2024–25 Excellence Cup

The Excellence Cup (Arabic: كأس التميز) is a knockout football tournament in Moroccan football, initiated in 2024 and organized by the LNFP. It is open to all professional clubs of the first and second divisions of each season.

Its objectives are the integration and development of young players, the gradual recovery after the breaks and the maintenance of competition rhythm during the suspensions of the league. Participating clubs are required to register at least ten under-23 players on the match squad and to play at least six throughout the match. The competition begins with a group stage consisting of eight groups and continues with a two-legged knockout phase which begins with the round of 16.

== History ==
On 21 June 2024, the president of the Ligue nationale de football professionnel Abdeslam Belkchour, announced during a meeting of the board of directors with the team coaches, the launch of the Excellence Cup. Organized under the aegis of the LNFP, it will be open to clubs competing in the Botola Pro and Botola Pro 2 of each season.

The LNFP states that the competition has the following objectives:

- The integration of under-23 players into the first team squad.
- The supervision of talented players likely to be called up to the national youth teams.
- The gradual resumption after the summer and winter breaks and during international breaks.
- Increasing the annual number of matches.
- Maintaining the pace of competition during league breaks.

On 3 September, the Excellence Cup was officially launched with a match between Olympique Dcheira and Hassania Agadir at the Ahmed Fana Stadium (2–0).

== Regulation ==
=== Format ===
The competition begins with a group stage played in a two-legged format, with the 32 teams divided into eight groups of four teams according to the ranking of the previous season, and the replacement of the D2 clubs relegated to D3 by the clubs newly promoted to D2. The first two teams in each group qualify for the round of 16, which is also played in a two-legged format. The final and the third place play-off are played in a single leg.

The group's distribution system
| Group 1 | Group 2 | Group 3 | Group 4 | Group 5 | Group 6 | Group 7 | Group 8 |
|---|---|---|---|---|---|---|---|
| 1st D1 | 2nd D1 | 3rd D1 | 4th D1 | 5th D1 | 6th D1 | 7th D1 | 8th D1 |
| 2nd D3 | 1st D3 | 14th D2 | 13th D2 | 12th D2 | 11th D2 | 10th D2 | 9th D2 |
| 9th D1 | 10th D1 | 11th D1 | 12th D1 | 13th D1 | 14th D1 | 15th D1 | 16th D1 |
| 8th D2 | 7th D2 | 6th D2 | 5th D2 | 4th D2 | 3th D2 | 2nd D2 | 1st D2 |

=== Player registration ===
This competition has the particularity of requiring participating clubs to register at least ten under-23 players on the match sheet and a mandatory participation of at least six under-23 players throughout the match. Even in the case of an expulsion of an under-23 player during a match, this quota must remain unchanged.

The number of players to be registered on the match sheet is twenty players maximum with a quota of foreigners of five players regardless of their age. Clubs are also required to align the technical staff of their first team.

== Results of finals ==
| No. | Season | Winner (Number of titles) | Score | Runner-up | Third place | Score | Fourth place | Ref |
|---|---|---|---|---|---|---|---|---|
| 1 | 2024–25 | Olympique Dcheira (1) | 2–1 | US Touarga | Raja CA | 1–1 (4–2 pens) | Wydad Fès | |

== Performance ==
=== Performance by clubs ===
List of football clubs ranked by total wins and runners-up.

| Club | Winners | Runner-up | Winning years | Runner-up years |
|---|---|---|---|---|
| Olympique Dcheira | 1 | - | 2025 | |
| US Touarga | - | 1 | | 2025 |

=== By city ===
| City | Championships | Clubs |
|---|---|---|
| Dcheira El Jihadia | 1 | Olympique Dcheira |

== Records ==
- First Match
  - (Olympique Dcheira vs Hassania Agadir)
- First win
  - Olympique Dcheira 2–0 Hassania Agadir
