= 2024–25 Excellence Cup =

Moroccan football competition

كأس التميز المغربي 2024–25

Tournament details
- Host country: Morocco
- Dates: 3 September 2024 – 25 June 2025
- Teams: 32

Final positions
- Champions: Olympique Dcheira (1st title)
- Runners-up: Union de Touarga
- Third place: Raja CA
- Fourth place: Wydad de Fes

Tournament statistics
- Matches played: 112
- Goals scored: 260 (2.32 per match)
- Top scorer(s): Amadou Dia N'Diaye; Papa Souley Diallo (5 goals)
- All statistics correct as of 25 June 2025.

The 2024–25 Moroccan Excellence Cup or 2024–25 Excellence Cup was the first edition of the Excellence Cup, the new tournament in Moroccan football.

== Group stage ==
=== Group A ===
Pos	Team	Pld	W	D	L	GF	GA	GD	Pts	Qualification	KAC	RCA	OCK	MAT
1	Kénitra AC	6	3	2	1	9	4	+5	11	Advance to Round of 16	—	0–1	1–0	2–0
2	Raja CA	6	3	1	2	7	7	0	10	Advance to Round of 16	2–2	—	2–3	1–0
3	OC Khouribga	6	2	1	3	9	11	−2	7		1–4	2–0	—	1–2
4	MA Tetouan	6	1	2	3	4	7	−3	5		0–0	0–1	2–2	—

Updated to match(es) played on 20 March 2025. Source: kooora
Rules for classification: 1) Points; 2) Goal difference; 3) Goals scored.

=== Group B ===
Pos	Team	Pld	W	D	L	GF	GA	GD	Pts	Qualification	OD	USYM	HUSA	ASFAR
1	Olympique Dcheira	6	3	1	2	10	8	+2	10	Advance to Round of 16	—	2–0	2–0	1–0
2	US Yacoub El Mansour	6	3	1	2	9	8	+1	10	Advance to Round of 16	4–4	—	0–1	1–0
3	HUS Agadir	6	3	0	3	6	7	−1	9		2–1	0–2	—	2–0
4	AS FAR	6	2	0	4	5	7	−2	6		2–0	1–2	2–1	—

Updated to match(es) played on 19 March 2025. Source: kooora
Rules for classification: 1) Points; 2) Goal difference; 3) Goals scored.

=== Group C ===
Pos	Team	Pld	W	D	L	GF	GA	GD	Pts	Qualification	RSB	WAF	MAS	RBM
1	RS Berkane	6	3	3	0	16	7	+9	12	Advance to Round of 16	—	4–0	3–3	3–0
2	Wydad Fès	6	2	3	1	10	9	+1	9	Advance to Round of 16	1–1	—	1–1	4–1
3	MAS Fès	6	1	2	3	11	14	−3	5		1–3	2–4	—	2–0
4	Raja Beni Mellal	6	1	2	3	6	13	−7	5		2–2	0–0	3–2	—

Updated to match(es) played on 19 March 2025. Source: kooora
Rules for classification: 1) Points; 2) Goal difference; 3) Goals scored.

=== Group D ===
Pos	Team	Pld	W	D	L	GF	GA	GD	Pts	Qualification	SM	UTS	RAC	IRT
1	Stade Marocain	6	5	0	1	9	4	+5	15	Advance to Round of 16	—	2–1	2–1	1–0
2	US Touarga	6	3	2	1	12	7	+5	11	Advance to Round of 16	2–1	—	2–2	4–1
3	RA Casablanca	6	2	2	2	11	11	0	8		0–2	1–1	—	3–1
4	IR Tanger	6	0	0	6	5	15	−10	0		0–1	0–2	3–4	—

Updated to match(es) played on 19 March 2025. Source: kooora
Rules for classification: 1) Points; 2) Goal difference; 3) Goals scored.

=== Group E ===
Pos	Team	Pld	W	D	L	GF	GA	GD	Pts	Qualification	KACM	WAC	JSS	JSM
1	KAC Marrakech	6	4	2	0	9	3	+6	14	Advance to Round of 16	—	2–0	2–0	2–1
2	Wydad AC	6	2	2	2	9	5	+4	8	Advance to Round of 16	0–0	—	2–2	2–0
3	JS Soualem	6	1	2	3	5	8	−3	5		1–2	1–0	—	0–0
4	JS Massira	6	1	2	3	4	11	−7	5		1–1	0–5	2–1	—

Updated to match(es) played on 20 March 2025. Source: kooora
Rules for classification: 1) Points; 2) Goal difference; 3) Goals scored.

=== Group F ===
Pos	Team	Pld	W	D	L	GF	GA	GD	Pts	Qualification	OCS	USMO	RCOZ	SCCM
1	OC Safi	6	3	3	0	9	5	+4	12	Advance to Round of 16	—	1–1	1–0	3–2
2	USM Oujda	6	3	3	0	7	4	+3	12	Advance to Round of 16	1–1	—	0–0	1–0
3	RC Oued Zem	6	2	2	2	5	4	+1	8		1–1	0–1	—	1–0
4	SCC Mohammédia	6	0	0	6	5	13	−8	0		0–2	2–3	1–3	—

Updated to match(es) played on 20 March 2025. Source: kooora
Rules for classification: 1) Points; 2) Goal difference; 3) Goals scored.

=== Group G ===
Pos	Team	Pld	W	D	L	GF	GA	GD	Pts	Qualification	FUS	CJBG	DHJ	MCO
1	FUS Rabat	6	3	2	1	7	3	+4	11	Advance to Round of 16	—	1–0	2–0	1–1
2	CJ Ben Guerir	6	2	3	1	5	4	+1	9	Advance to Round of 16	2–1	—	1–1	2–1
3	Difaâ El Jadida	6	1	4	1	3	3	0	7		0–0	0–0	—	0–0
4	MC Oujda	6	0	3	3	2	7	−5	3		0–2	0–0	0–2	—

Updated to match(es) played on 20 March 2025. Source: kooora
Rules for classification: 1) Points; 2) Goal difference; 3) Goals scored.

=== Group H ===
Pos	Team	Pld	W	D	L	GF	GA	GD	Pts	Qualification	RCAZ	CODM	CAK	CAYB
1	RCA Zemamra	6	4	2	0	11	3	+8	14	Advance to Round of 16	—	4–0	1–0	1–0
2	COD Meknès	6	2	2	2	6	9	−3	8	Advance to Round of 16	3–3	—	1–0	2–1
3	CA Khénifra	6	1	3	2	2	2	0	6		0–0	0–0	—	2–0
4	CAY Berrechid	6	1	1	4	2	7	−5	4		0–2	1–0	0–0	—

Updated to match(es) played on 20 March 2025. Source: kooora
Rules for classification: 1) Points; 2) Goal difference; 3) Goals scored.

== Knockout phase ==
=== Round of 16 ===
A total of eight games were played on 2–4 June 2025.

Team 1	Score	Team 2
FUS Rabat	0–0 (5–4 p)	US Yacoub El Mansour
OC Safi	0–1	Wydad Fès
RCA Zemamra	1–2	Raja CA
Kénitra AC	0–0 (2–3 p)	COD Meknès
Olympique Dcheira	1–0	CJ Ben Guerir
Stade Marocain	1–2	Wydad AC
KAC Marrakech	2–2 (2–4 p)	Union de Touarga
RS Berkane	3–1	USM Oujda

=== Quarter-finals ===
The quarter-final matches were played on 10–11 June 2025.

Team 1	Score	Team 2
Union de Touarga	2–0	Wydad AC
Wydad Fès	1–0	RS Berkane
FUS Rabat	1–1 (3–4 p)	Olympique Dcheira
Raja CA	2–1	COD Meknès

=== Semi-finals ===
The semi-final matches were played on 18 June 2025.

Team 1	Score	Team 2
Olympique Dcheira	0–0 (6–5 p)	Raja CA
Union de Touarga	1–0	Wydad Fès

=== Third place play-off ===
The third place play-off was played on 24 June 2025.

Team 1	Score	Team 2
Wydad Fès	1–1 (2–4 p)	Raja CA

== Final ==
25 June 2025
20:00 UTC+1

Olympique Dcheira	2–1	Union de Touarga
Adjar 38'; Salaheddine 90+6'	Report	El Khalej 53'

Municipal Stadium, Berrechid

== See also ==
- 2024–25 Botola
- 2024–25 Moroccan Throne Cup
