= Rehamna Province =

Rehamna Province إقليم الرحامنة
- Province
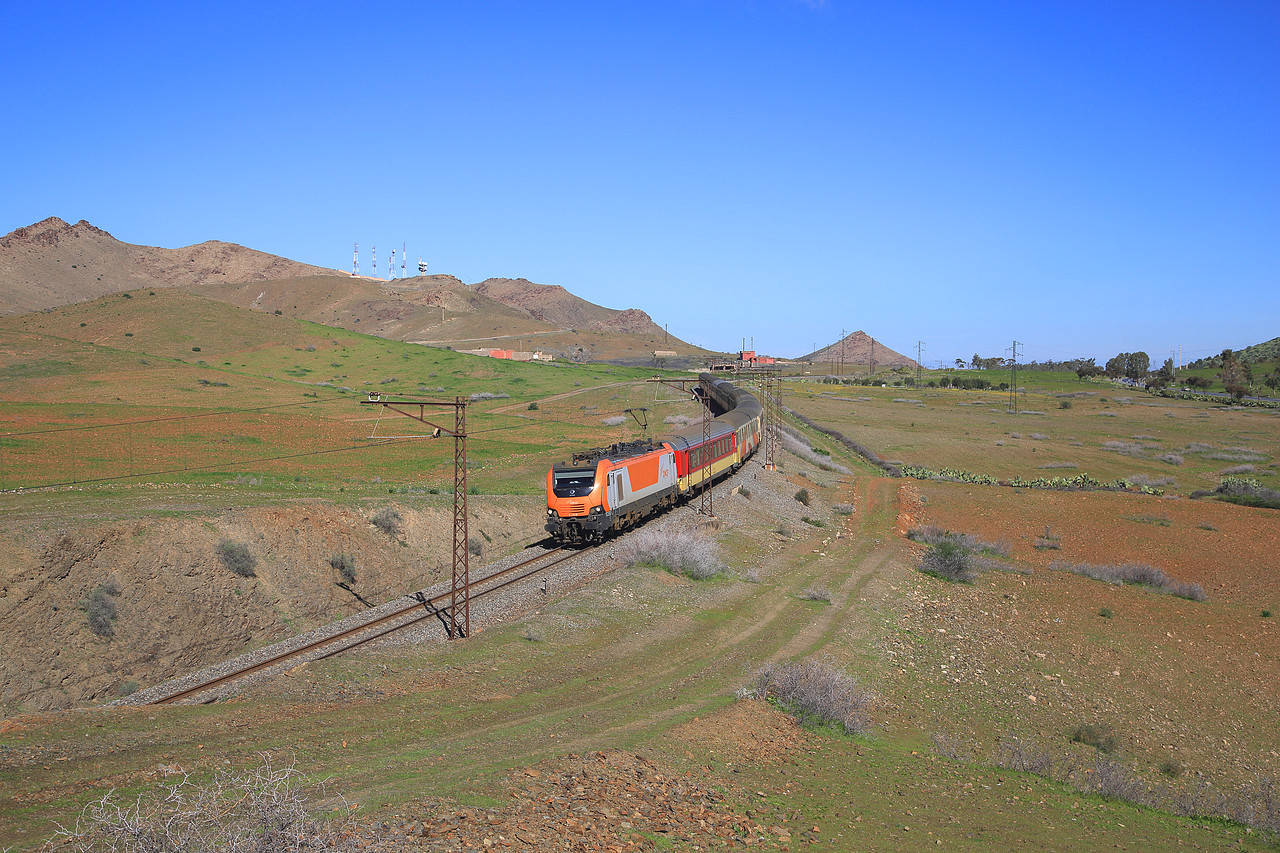
- Interactive map of Rehamna Province
- Coordinates: 32.2392°N 7.9581°W
- Country: Morocco
- Region: Marrakesh-Safi
- Capital: Benguerir

Area
  - Total: 20,986 km^{2} (8,103 sq mi)

Population (2024)
  - Total: 346,108
  - Density: 16.492/km^{2} (42.715/sq mi)
- Time zone: UTC+0 (GMT)

Rehamna (Arabic: الرحامنة) or Rhamna is a province in the Moroccan region of Marrakesh-Safi. Its population in 2024 was 346,108. The capital of the province is Benguerir.

== Subdivisions ==
The 23 rural communes are attached to 7 caidats, themselves part of 2 circles:

- circle of Rehamna
  - caidat of Oulad Tmim: Jaafra, Sidi Abdallah and Skoura Lhadra
  - caidat of Skhour: Sidi Ghanem, Sidi Mansour and Skhour Rehamna
  - caidat of Labrikiyne: Sidi Ali Labrahla, Oulad Hassoune Hamri and Labrikiyne
  - caidat of Tnine Bouchane: Oulad Aamer Tizmarine, Ait Hammou, Bouchane and Ait Taleb
- circle of Sidi Bou Othmane
  - caidat of Sidi Bou Othmane: Bourrous, Sidi Boubker and Jbilate
  - caidat of Louta: Nzalat Laadam, Lamharra and Oulad Imloul
  - caidat of Ras El Aïn: Akarma, Tlauh, Jaidate and Ras Ain Rhamna
