= Kalaat Sraghna Province =

Kalaat Sraghna Province إقليم قلعة السراغنة
- Province
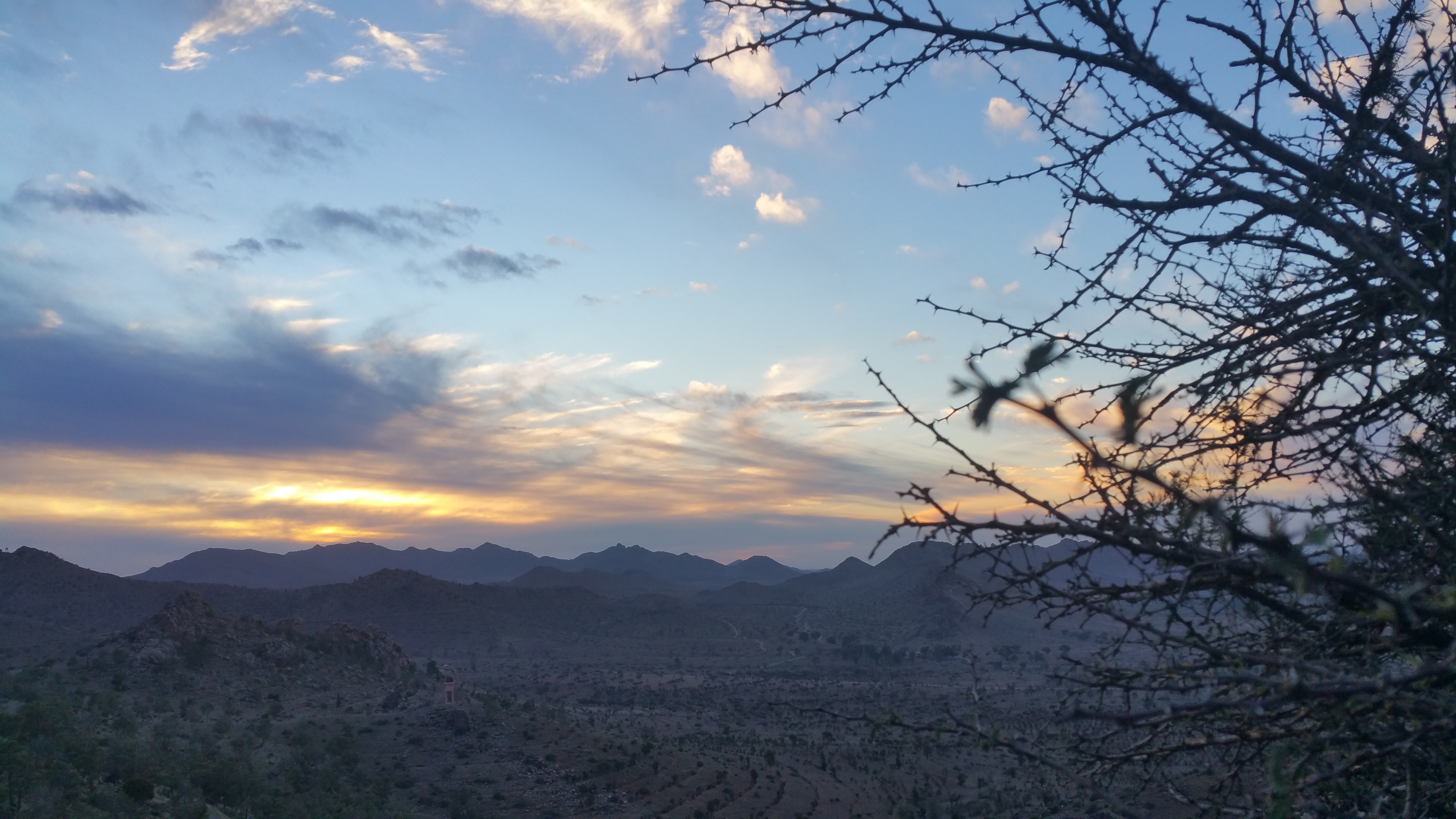
- Interactive map of Kalaat Sraghna Province
- Coordinates: 32°3′N 7°24′W
- Country: Morocco
- Region: Marrakesh-Safi
- Capital: Kalaat Sraghna

Area
  - Total: 4,214 km^{2} (1,627 sq mi)
- Elevation: 468 m (1,535 ft)

Population (2024)
  - Total: 560,075
- Time zone: UTC+0 (GMT)

Kelaat Sraghna (Arabic: إقليم قلعة السراغنة) is a province in the Moroccan economic region of Marrakesh-Safi. Its population in 2024 was 560,075. In 2009, its western half was separated to form Rehamna Province.

The economy of the province is primarily based on agriculture, particularly olive cultivation and sheep farming.

The major cities are:

- Kalaat Sraghna
- Tamallalt
- Laattaouia

== Subdivisions ==
The province is divided administratively into the following:

Name	Geographic code	Type	Households	Population (2004)	Foreign population	Moroccan population	Notes
Kalaat Sraghna	191.01.03.	Municipality	13722	68694	27	68667	
Laattaouia	191.01.05.	Municipality	3769	20237	0	20237	
Sidi Rahhal	191.01.07.	Municipality	1228	6352	1	6351	
Tamallalt	191.01.09.	Municipality	2137	12212	2	12210	
Chtaiba	191.03.01.	Rural commune	1246	7874	0	7874	
Eddachra	191.03.03.	Rural commune	1032	6754	0	6754	
El Aamria	191.03.05.	Rural commune	1337	8382	0	8382	
El Marbouh	191.03.07.	Rural commune	1294	7587	0	7587	
Errafiaya	191.03.09.	Rural commune	780	4559	0	4559	
Hiadna	191.03.11.	Rural commune	1402	9501	0	9501	
Lounasda	191.03.13.	Rural commune	1503	9568	0	9568	
Mayate	191.03.15.	Rural commune	1779	11504	0	11504	
Oulad Aamer	191.03.17.	Rural commune	926	6089	0	6089	
Oulad Bouali Loued	191.03.19.	Rural commune	933	6031	0	6031	
Oulad Cherki	191.03.21.	Rural commune	1019	7165	0	7165	
Oulad El Garne	191.03.23.	Rural commune	1069	6174	0	6174	
Oulad Massaoud	191.03.25.	Rural commune	749	4773	0	4773	
Oulad Msabbel	191.03.27.	Rural commune	852	5527	0	5527	
Oulad Sbih	191.03.29.	Rural commune	970	6131	0	6131	
Oulad Yaacoub	191.03.31.	Rural commune	1152	6497	1	6496	
Oulad Zarrad	191.03.33.	Rural commune	1744	11228	0	11228	
Sidi El Hattab	191.03.35.	Rural commune	1149	8191	0	8191	
Sidi Moussa	191.03.37.	Rural commune	1314	9260	0	9260	
Taouzint	191.03.39.	Rural commune	813	5111	0	5111	
Znada	191.03.41.	Rural commune	1530	8830	1	8829	
Assahrij	191.05.01.	Rural commune	2188	14165	0	14165	1732 residents live in the center, called Assahrij; 12433 residents live in rural areas.
Bouya Omar	191.05.03.	Rural commune	2142	13640	3	13637	
Choara	191.05.05.	Rural commune	1489	9577	0	9577	
Dzouz	191.05.07.	Rural commune	1479	9525	0	9525	
Fraita	191.05.09.	Rural commune	1759	10555	0	10555	
Jbiel	191.05.11.	Rural commune	1751	10852	0	10852	
Jouala	191.05.13.	Rural commune	1771	11373	0	11373	
Laatamna	191.05.15.	Rural commune	1697	10110	0	10110	
Laattaouia Ech-Chaybia	191.05.16.	Rural commune	673	3890	0	3890	
Loued Lakhdar	191.05.17.	Rural commune	1469	9362	0	9362	
M'Zem Sanhaja	191.05.19.	Rural commune	1359	9253	1	9252	
Ouargui	191.05.21.	Rural commune	1615	10113	0	10113	
Oulad Aarrad	191.05.23.	Rural commune	1002	6491	0	6491	
Oulad Khallouf	191.05.25.	Rural commune	1249	8064	0	8064	
Sidi Aissa Ben Slimane	191.05.27.	Rural commune	2795	17708	0	17708	
Sour El Aaz	191.05.29.	Rural commune	684	3910	0	3910	
Zemrane	191.05.31.	Rural commune	2477	15996	0	15996	
Zemrane Charqia	191.05.33.	Rural commune	4198	27415	1	27414	
