= Marrakesh-Safi =

Region of Morocco

Marrakesh-Safi Region جهة مراكش آسفي (Arabic) ⵜⴰⵎⵏⴰⴹⵜ ⵏ ⵎⵕⵕⴰⴽⵛ-ⴰⵙⴼⵉ (Standard Moroccan Tamazight)
- Region
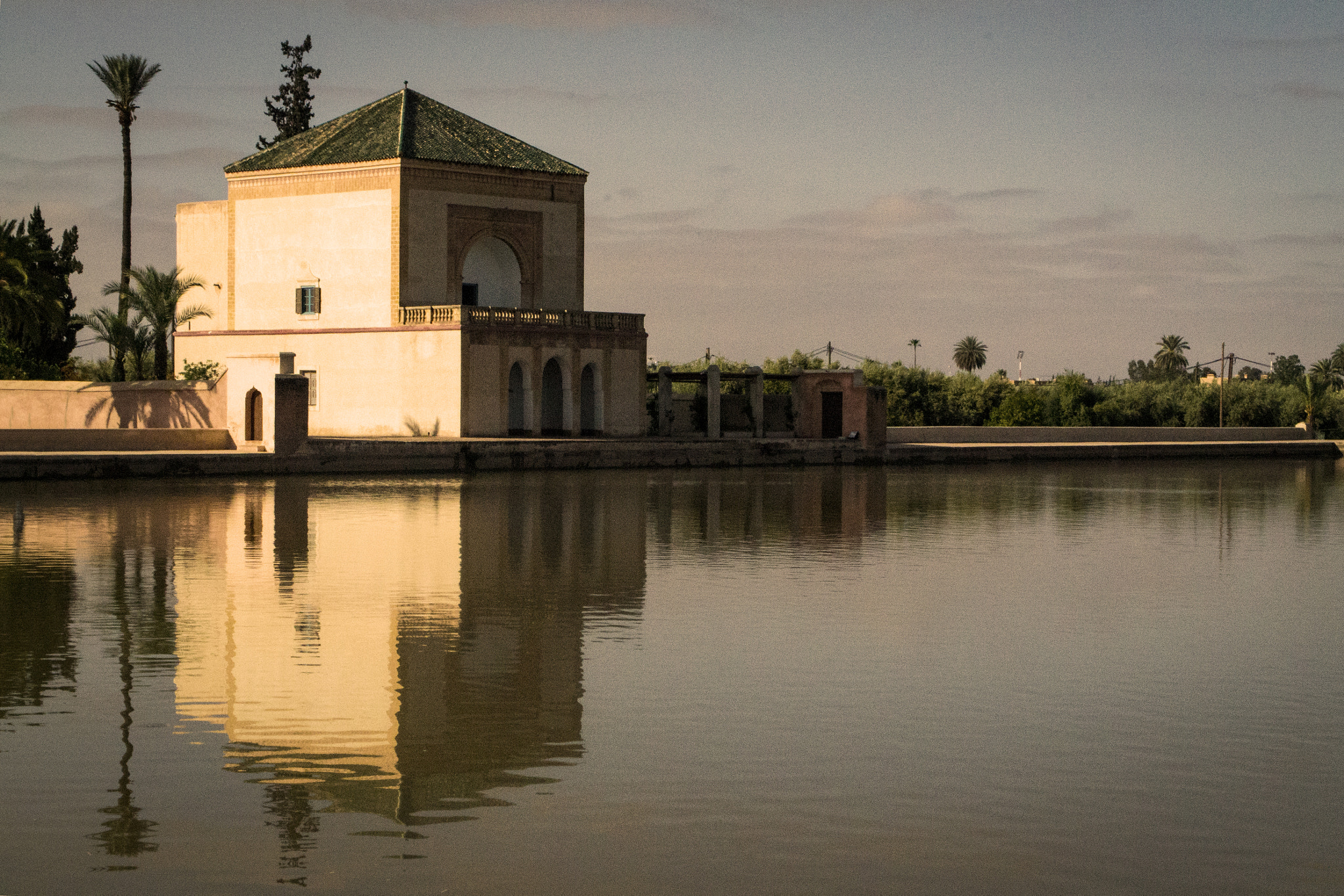

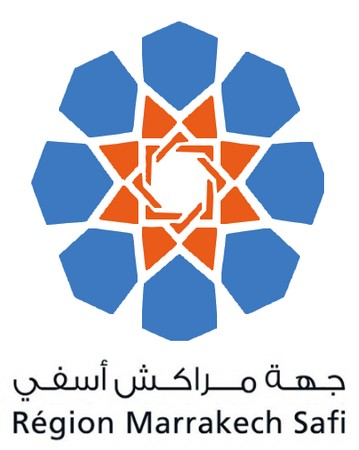
- Flag Seal

- Location in Morocco
- Coordinates: 31°37′N 8°0′W
- Country: Morocco
- Capital: Marrakesh

Government
  - Type: Governor–regional council
  - Wali: Khatib El Hebil
  - President: Samir Goudar (PAM)

Population (2024)
  - Total: 4,878,500
  - Rank: 3rd out of 12 regions
- Time zone: UTC+0 (GMT)

Marrakesh-Safi (Note: Arabic: مراكش آسفي, romanized: murrākuš āsafi Standard Moroccan Tamazight: ⵎⵕⵕⴰⴽⵛ-ⴰⵙⴼⵉ) is one of the twelve regions of Morocco. Its population in 2024 was 4,878,500. The capital is Marrakesh.

== History ==
Marrakesh-Asfi was formed in September 2015 by merging the old region of Marrakesh-Tensift-El Haouz with the provinces of Asfi and Youssoufia in Doukkala-Abda region.

In September 2023 the region was struck by a large magnitude 6.9 earthquake that reportedly left over 2,800 people dead and injured more than 3,000 others.

On 19 October 2025, Khatib El Hebil was appointed Wali of the Marrakesh-Safi region and Governor of the Marrakesh prefecture by King Mohammed VI, during a Council of Ministers meeting in Rabat.

== Government ==
=== Subdivisions ===
Provinces of Marrakesh-Safi

The region is made up of the following provinces and prefectures:

- Prefecture of Marrakesh
- Al Haouz Province
- Chichaoua Province
- El Kelâa des Sraghna Province
- Essaouira Province
- Rehamna Province
- Safi Province
- Youssoufia Province

=== Regional leadership ===
Wali of Marrakesh-Safi since 2015
Name	Duration	Under
Abdelfattah Lebjioui	2015–2017	King Mohammed VI
Mohamed Sabri (acting wali)	2017–2018	King Mohammed VI
Karim Kassi-Lahlou	2018–2023	King Mohammed VI
Farid Chourak	2023–2025	King Mohammed VI
Khatib El Hebil	2025–present	King Mohammed VI

Regional Council Presidents of Marrakesh-Safi since 2015
Name	Duration	Party	Under
Ahmed Akhchichine	2015–2021	PAM	King Mohammed VI
Samir Goudar	2021–present	PAM	King Mohammed VI
