= 2026–27 Raja CA season =

Raja CA
2026–27 season
- President: Jawad Ziyat
- Manager: Paco Jémez (until 2 November); Abdelkrim Jinani
- Stadium: Stade Mohammed V
- Botola: Pre-season
- Throne Cup: Round of 32
- CAF Confederation Cup: Second round
- Top goalscorer: League: Mathias Oyewusi (1); All: Mathias Oyewusi (2)
- Biggest win: 2–0 v. El-Kanemi Warriors (Home, 22 October 2026, CAF Champions League)
- Biggest defeat: 2–0 v. RS Berkane (Away, 1 November 2026, Botola)

The 2026–27 season is Raja Club Athletic's 78th season season in existence and the club's 70th consecutive season in the top flight of Moroccan football. In addition to the domestic league, they are also participating in this season's editions of the Throne Cup and the CAF Confederation Cup

== Before the season ==
=== New sporting direction ===
On 9 July 2026, Raja announced their new management structure under the leadership of the General sporting manager Rogério Matias. The former Portuguese international arrive after a four-year successful tenure as sporting director of Vitória Guimarães, achieving a historic European run and over €100 million of transfer revenus. He will rely on a strategic triumvirate: Silveira Ramos, former technical director of the Portuguese Football Federation, will oversee the Academy; Rui Pedro Amaro will take charge of the Scouting & Data department; while Moroccan coach Anwar Mghinia—fresh off a round-of-16 finish at the 2025 U17 Women's World Cup—will lead the Performance department.

== Players ==
=== First-team squad ===
Notes:

- Players and squad numbers last updated on 15 September 2026. Age as of 30 June 2027.
- Flags indicate national team as has been defined under FIFA eligibility rules. Players may hold more than one non-FIFA nationality.

No.	Name	Nat.	Position	Date of Birth (Age)	Signed from
Goalkeepers
1	El Mehdi Al Harrar	(Morocco)	GK	30 November 2000 (aged 26)	(Morocco) Chabab Mohammédia
12	Khalid Kbiri Alaoui	(Morocco)	GK	28 June 1996 (aged 31)	(Morocco) OC Safi
22	Saad Antra	(Morocco)	GK	18 August 2007 (aged 19)	(Morocco) Youth system
32	Yassine Zoubir	(Morocco)	GK	24 February 2002 (aged 25)	(Morocco) Youth system
Defenders
2	Marian Huja	(Portugal)	CB	5 August 1999 (aged 27)	(Romania) CFR Cluj
3	Chemseddine Knaidil	(Morocco)	LB	6 December 2002 (aged 24)	(Morocco) COD Meknès
4	Ismael Mokadem	(Morocco)	CB	26 July 1995 (aged 31)	(Saudi Arabia) Al Ula FC
5	Bouchaib Arrassi	(Morocco)	CB	6 January 2000 (aged 27)	(Morocco) Youth system
7	Mohamed Boulacsoute	(Morocco)	RB	23 September 1998 (aged 28)	(Morocco) Chabab Mohammédia
13	Badr Benoun (c)	(Morocco)	CB	30 September 1993 (aged 33)	Qatar SC
17	Ayoub El Amloud	(Morocco)	RB	8 April 1994 (aged 33)	(Bahrain) Al-Khaldiya
24	Amine Khammas	(Morocco)	LB	6 April 1999 (aged 28)	(Cyprus) Omonia Nicosia
Midfielders
6	Aymen Barkok	(Morocco)	CM	21 May 1998 (aged 29)	(Germany) Schalke 04
8	Ishak Zidani	(Morocco)	CM	25 February 2001 (aged 26)	(Morocco) RCA Zemamra
10	Felipinho	(Brazil)	AM / RW	7 January 2005 (aged 22)	(Brazil) Fluminense
16	Anas Benomar	(Morocco)	CM	5 April 2008 (aged 19)	(Morocco) Youth system
19	Othmane Chraibi	(Morocco)	DM	21 February 2003 (aged 24)	(France) FC Metz
23	Mohamed Al Makahasi	(Morocco)	CM	5 February 1995 (aged 32)	(Saudi Arabia) Al Wehda FC
30	Michael Agbekpornu	(Ghana)	DM	31 August 1998 (aged 28)	(Spain) Huesca
Forwards
9	Ismail Khafi	(Morocco)	ST	19 September 1995 (aged 31)	(Kuwait) Qadsia SC
11	Youness Dahmani	(Morocco)	LW	18 December 2000 (aged 26)	(Morocco) US Touarga
14	Younes Bakiz	(Denmark)	LW / AM	5 February 1999 (aged 28)	(Denmark) Silkeborg IF
18	Yahya Iguiz	(Morocco)	ST	23 December 2008 (aged 18)	(Morocco) Youth system
21	Adel Bettaieb	(Tunisia)	ST / LW	28 January 1997 (aged 30)	(Romania) Argeș Pitești
27	Sharara	(Jordan)	RW / LW	30 December 1997 (aged 29)	(Jordan) Al-Ramtha
45	Bilal Ould-Chikh	(Morocco)	RW	28 July 1997 (aged 29)	(Netherlands) FC Volendam
70	Mounaïm El Idrissy	(Morocco)	ST	10 February 1999 (aged 28)	(France) Troyes
77	Adam Ennafati	(Morocco)	LW / RW	29 June 1994 (aged 33)	(Morocco) AS FAR
99	Mathias Oyewusi	(Nigeria)	ST	2 February 1999 (aged 28)	(Ukraine) Kolos Kovalivka

== Transfers ==
=== Contract extensions ===
Date	Pos'	Player	Contract ends	Ref.
11 September 2026	MF	(Morocco) Anas Benomar	2029	

=== Transfers in ===
Date	Pos'	Player	Moving from	Fee	Ref.
30 June 2026	FW	(Morocco) Bilal Ould-Chikh	(Netherlands) FC Volendam	End of loan	–
30 June 2026	DF	(Morocco) Bouchaib Arrassi	Ararat-Armenia	End of loan	–
27 July 2026	DF	(Morocco) Chemseddine Knaidil	(Morocco) COD Meknès	€80 k	
29 July 2026	MF	(Morocco) Ishak Zidani	(Morocco) RCA Zemamra	€80 k	
7 August 2026	FW	(Morocco) Youness Dahmani	(Morocco) US Touarga	€650 k	
13 August 2026	FW	(Brazil) Felipinho	(Brazil) Fluminense	Free agent	
20 August 2026	DF	(Portugal) Marian Huja	(Romania) CFR Cluj	€350 k	
20 August 2026	MF	(Ghana) Michael Agbekpornu	(Spain) Huesca	Free agent	
2 September 2026	FW	(Morocco) Mounaïm El Idrissy	(France) Troyes	Free agent	
5 September 2026	FW	(Tunisia) Adel Bettaieb	(Romania) Argeș Pitești	Free agent	
13 September 2026	FW	(Denmark) Younes Bakiz	(Denmark) Silkeborg IF	Loan (€50 k (Note: Option to buy for €250,000 at the end of the season))	

=== Transfers out ===
Date	Pos'	Player	Moving to	Fee	Ref.
8 July 2026	FW	(Morocco) Mouad Dahak	End of loan	–	
8 July 2026	MF	(Guinea) Balla Moussa Conté	End of loan	–	
8 July 2026	MF	(Kosovo) Besar Halimi	End of contract	–	
8 July 2026	MF	(Morocco) Hilal Ferdaoussi	End of contract	–	
8 July 2026	DF	(Morocco) Abdelkarim Baadi	End of contract	–	
12 July 2026	MF	(Morocco) Sabir Bougrine	End of contract	–	
20 July 2026	DF	(Morocco) Abdellah Khafifi	End of contract	–	
14 August 2026	FW	(Morocco) Ayoub Maamouri	(Morocco) Kawkab Marrakesh	€55 k	
10 September 2026	DF	(Morocco) Mehdi Mchakhchekh	(Azerbaijan) Zirə FK	Undisclosed	
10 September 2026	FW	(Senegal) Pape Ousmane Sakho	Termination of contract	–	

== Pre-season and friendlies ==
The team will hold a training camp in Agadir for ten days starting 17 August 2026.

Win Draw Loss

Fixtures

10 August 2026 Friendly	Raja CA	8–0	JS Roches noires	Bouskoura
15:00	Shararah; Mchakhchekh; Maamouri; Oyewusi; Benoun; Boulacsoute	Report		Stadium: Raja CA Academy; Attendance: 0

15 August 2026 Friendly	Raja CA	7–0	Amal Daroua	Bouskoura
15:00	Laftah; Dahmani; Iguiz; Chraibi; Shararah	Report		Stadium: Raja CA Academy; Attendance: 0

19 September 2026 Friendly	Raja CA	1–0	US Amal Tiznit	Bouskoura
13:00	Chraibi 85'	Report		Stadium: Raja CA Academy; Attendance: 0

=== Mohamed Timoumi Tournament ===
3 September 2026 Friendly	Raja CA	1–0	RS Berkane	Rabat
20:00	Chraibi 88'	Report		Stadium: Moulay Hassan Stadium; Attendance: 0 Referee: Amine El Maataoui

6 September 2026 Friendly	WS Témara	1–0	Raja CA	Rabat
17:00	Khouidssi 67'	Report		Stadium: Moulay Hassan Stadium; Attendance: 0 Referee: Youssef Triki

9 September 2026 Friendly	Union Touarga	0–1	Raja CA	Rabat
20:30		Report	Sakho 44'	Stadium: Al Medina Stadium; Attendance: 0

== Competitions ==
=== Overview ===
Competition	First match	Last match	Starting round	Final position	Record							
Competition	First match	Last match	Starting round	Final position	Pld	W	D	L	GF	GA	GD	Win %
Botola	3 October 2026	TBD	Matchday 1	TBD	7	3	3	1	7	5	+2	42.86
Throne Cup	TBD	TBD	Round of 32	TBD	0	0	0	0	0	0	+0	—
Confederation Cup	17 October 2026	TBD	Second round	TBD	2	1	1	0	4	2	+2	50.00
Total					9	4	4	1	11	7	+4	44.44

Last updated: 8 November 2026
Source: Sofascore

=== Botola ===
==== Results summary ====
Overall								Home						Away					
Pld	W	D	L	GF	GA	GD	Pts	W	D	L	GF	GA	GD	W	D	L	GF	GA	GD
7	3	3	1	7	5	+2	12	2	1	0	4	1	+3	1	2	1	3	4	−1

Source: Competitive matches

==== Results by round ====
Round	1	2	3	4	5	6	7	8	9	10	11	12	13	14	15	16	17	18	19	20	21	22	23	24	25	26	27	28	29	30
Ground	H	A	A	H	A	A	H																							
Result	W	D	D	D	L	W	W																							
Position	6	5	5	6	8	5	3																							

Updated to match(es) played on 8 November 2026. Source: Competitive matches
A = Away; H = Home; W = Win; D = Draw; L = Loss

==== Matches ====
The league fixtures were released on 28 August 2026. The league is scheduled to start on 23 September.

3 October 2026 Round 2	Raja CA	1–0	RCA Zemamra	Casablanca
20:00	Chraibi 26'	Report		Stadium: Stade Mohammed V Attendance: 45000; Referee: Nabil Berkia

8 October 2026 Round 3	Maghreb de Fès	0–0	Raja CA	Meknès
20:00		Report	Chraibi (red card) 36'	Stadium: Honneur Stadium; Attendance: 15000; Referee: Mohamed Lahouidri

13 October 2026 Round 4	Fath Union Sport	1–1	Raja CA	Rabat
20:00	Bakhkhach 69'	Report	Bettaieb 20'	Stadium: Stade Moulay Hassan; Attendance: 2000; Referee: Said Boujidi

28 October 2026 Round 5	Raja CA	1–1	Hassania Agadir	Casablanca
18:00	Oyewusi 81'	Report	Azri 66'	Stadium: Berkane Municipal Stadium; Attendance: 2000; Referee: Azzedine Boulfaid

1 November 2026 Round 6	RS Berkane	2–0	Raja CA	Berkane
20:00	Mehri 29'; Labhiri 85'	Report		Stadium: Stade Mohammed V Attendance: 5000; Referee: Mohamed Jamlaoui

4 November 2026 Round 1	AS FAR	1–2	Raja CA	Rabat
20:00	El Fahli 27'	Report	Khafi 2'; * Ennafati 37'	Stadium: Moulay Abdellah Stadium; Attendance: 10000; Referee: Hamza Fareq

8 November 2026 Round 7	Raja CA	2–0	IR Tanger	Casablanca
20:00	Barkok 7' (pen.); El Amloud 45+6'	Report		Stadium: Stade Larbi Zaouli; Attendance: 5000; Referee: Mohamed El Baroudi

Round 8	WS Temara	–	Raja CA	Rabat
:				Stadium: TBC

Round 9	Raja CA	–	Difaâ Hassani El Jadidi	Casablanca
:				Stadium: Stade Mohammed V

Round 10	COD Meknès	–	Raja CA	Meknès
:				Stadium: Honneur Stadium

Round 11	Raja CA	–	Wydad AC	Casablanca
:				Stadium: Stade Mohammed V

Round 12	US Amal Tiznit	–	Raja CA	Agadir
:				Stadium: Stade Adrar

Round 13	Raja CA	–	Kawkab Marrakech	Casablanca
:				Stadium: Stade Mohammed V

Round 14	Union Touarga	–	Raja CA	Rabat
:				Stadium: Al Medina Stadium

Round 15	Raja CA	–	Moghreb Tetouan	Casablanca
:				Stadium: Stade Mohammed V

Round 16	Raja CA	–	AS FAR	Casablanca
				Stadium: Stade Mohammed V

Round 17	RCA Zemamra	–	Raja CA	Zemamra
:				Stadium: Stade Ahmed Choukri

Round 18	Raja CA	–	Maghreb de Fès	Casablanca
:				Stadium: Stade Mohammed V

Round 19	Raja CA	–	Fath Union Sport	Casablanca
:				Stadium: Stade Mohammed V

Round 20	Hassania Agadir	–	Raja CA	Agadir
:				Stadium: Stade Adrar

Round 21	Raja CA	–	RS Berkane	Casablanca
:				Stadium: Stade Mohammed V

Round 22	IR Tanger	–	Raja CA	Tangier
:				Stadium: Stade Ibn Batouta

Round 23	Raja CA	–	WS Temara	Casablanca
:				Stadium: Stade Mohammed V

Round 24	Difaâ Hassani El Jadidi	–	Raja CA	El Jadida
:				Stadium: Ben M'Hamed El Abdi Stadium

Round 25	Raja CA	–	COD Meknès	Casablanca
:				Stadium: Stade Mohammed V

Round 26	Wydad AC	–	Raja CA	Casablanca
:				Stadium: Stade Mohammed V

Round 27	Raja CA	–	US Amal Tiznit	Casablanca
:				Stadium: Stade Mohammed V

Round 28	Kawkab Marrakech	–	Raja CA	Marrakesh
:				Stadium: Marrakesh Stadium

Round 29	Raja CA	–	Union Touarga	Casablanca
:				Stadium: Stade Mohammed V

Round 30	Moghreb Tetouan	–	Raja CA	Tetouan
:				Stadium: Stade Saniat Rmel

=== Throne Cup ===
TBC Round of 32	Raja CA	v	TBC	TBC
TBC				Stadium: TBC

=== Confederation Cup ===
17 October 2026	El-Kanemi Warriors (Nigeria)	2–2	(Morocco) Raja CA	Ikenne
15:00 UTC+1	6'; 83'	Report	Sharara 23'; Oyewusi 60'	Stadium: Remo Stars Stadium; Attendance: 4000; Referee: Sulaiman Kamara (Sierra Leone)

22 October 2026	Raja CA (Morocco)	2–0	(Nigeria) El-Kanemi Warriors	Casablanca
20:00 UTC+1	Barkok 88'; Huja 90+5'	Report		Stadium: Stade Mohammed V Attendance: 40000; Referee: Yannick Kabanga Malala (DR Congo)

==== Group Stage ====
The group stage draw was held on 28 October 2026.

Pos	Team	Pld	W	D	L	GF	GA	GD	Pts	Qualification	AHL	RCA	ASK	CPA
1	(Egypt) Al Ahly	0	0	0	0	0	0	0	0	Advance to knockout stage	—	20 Dec	24 Jan	29 Nov
2	(Morocco) Raja CA	0	0	0	0	0	0	0	0	Advance to knockout stage	10 Jan	—	29 Nov	24 Jan
3	(Togo) ASKO Kara	0	0	0	0	0	0	0	0		6 Dec	17 Jan	—	10 Jan
4	(Angola) Primeiro de Agosto	0	0	0	0	0	0	0	0		17 Jan	6 Dec	20 Dec	—

First match(es) will be played: 27 November 2026. Source: CAF
Rules for classification: Group stage tiebreakers

27–29 November 2026 1	Raja CA (Morocco)	v	(Togo) ASKO Kara	Casablanca
--:-- UTC+1				Stadium: Stade Mohammed V

4–6 December 2026 2	Primeiro de Agosto (Angola)	v	(Morocco) Raja CA	Luanda
--:-- UTC+1				Stadium: França Ndalu Stadium

18–20 December 2026 3	Al Ahly (Egypt)	v	(Morocco) Raja CA	Cairo
--:-- UTC+2				Stadium: Cairo International Stadium

8–10 January 2027 4	Raja CA (Morocco)	v	(Egypt) Al Ahly	Casablanca
--:-- UTC+1				Stadium: Stade Mohammed V

15–17 January 2027 5	ASKO Kara (Togo)	v	(Morocco) Raja CA	Lomé
--:-- UTC+0				Stadium: Kégué Stadium

22–24 January 2027 6	Raja CA (Morocco)	v	(Angola) Primeiro de Agosto	Casablanca
--:-- UTC+1				Stadium: Stade Mohammed V

== Squad information ==
=== Goals ===
Includes all competitive matches. The list is sorted alphabetically by surname when total goals are equal.

Rank	Pos.	Player	Botola	Throne Cup	Confederation Cup	Total
1	FW	(Nigeria) Mathias Oyewusi	1	0	1	2
2	MF	(Morocco) Aymen Barkok	0	0	1	1
3	FW	(Morocco) Adam Ennafati	1	0	0	1
4	FW	(Tunisia) Adel Bettaieb	1	0	0	1
5	FW	(Morocco) Ismail Khafi	1	0	0	1
6	DF	(Morocco) Ayoub El Amloud	1	0	0	1
7	FW	(Jordan) Sharara	0	0	1	1
8	MF	(Morocco) Othmane Chraibi	1	0	0	1
9	DF	(Portugal) Marian Huja	0	0	1	1
10						
Own goals			0	0	0	0
Total			7	0	4	11

=== Assists ===
Rank	Pos.	Player	Botola	Throne Cup	Confederation Cup	Total
1	FW	(Morocco) Adam Ennafati	2	0	0	2
2	DF	(Morocco) Mohamed Boulacsoute	1	0	0	1
3	FW	(Nigeria) Mathias Oyewusi	0	0	1	1
4	FW	(Morocco) Ismail Khafi	1	0	0	1
5	FW	(Jordan) Sharara	0	0	1	1
6	DF	(Morocco) Bouchaib Arrassi	1	0	0	1
7						
8						
9						
10						
Total			5	0	2	7

=== Clean sheets ===
No.	Player	Botola	Throne Cup	Confederation Cup	Total
1	(Morocco) El Mehdi Al Harrar	3	0	0	3
32	(Morocco) Yassine Zoubir	0	0	1	1
Total		3	0	1	4
