= 2025–26 Raja CA season =

Raja CA
2025–26 season
- President: Jawad Ziyat
- Manager: Lassaad Chabbi (until 22 September); Fadlu Davids (until 12 June 2026); Nasreddine Nabi
- Stadium: Stade Mohammed V
- Botola: 3rd
- Throne Cup: Round of 16
- Top goalscorer: League: Adam Ennafati (6); All: Adam Ennafati (6)
- Average home league attendance: 27,431
- Biggest win: 4–1 v Fath Union Sport (Home, 26 April 2026, Botola)
- Biggest defeat: 2–0 v KAC Marrakesh (Away, 9 June 2026, Botola)
Home colours	Away colours

The 2025–26 season is Raja Club Athletic's 77th season in existence and the club's 69th consecutive season in the top flight of Moroccan football. In addition to the domestic league, they are also participating in this season's edition of the Throne Cup.

This is the first season since 2014–15 without Anas Zniti who joined Al Wasl on 14 January 2025, and the first since 2017–18 without Mohamed Zrida who joined Al-Ittihad Tripoli on 11 February 2025.

== Before the season ==
=== Elections ===
The club has set 7 July 2025, as the date for the general assembly to elect the new president and his committee. Three candidates are running for the presidency: Jawad Ziyat, Abdellah Biraouine, and Said Hasbane.

Ziyat is supported by the vast majority of supporters. During his first tenure between 2018 and 2020, he successfully turned the club around from a deep financial crisis and won three titles. Biraouine took over as interim president following Adil Hala's resignation in January 2025, while Said Hasbane faces stiff opposition due to his disastrous management of the club between 2016 and 2018. The meeting will be held as the club prepares to take a major step in its restructuring with the activation of its limited company (S.A.). Jawad Ziyat told Médias 24 that his first objective is to successfully launch the strategic partnership with Marsa Maroc. This project, unveiled at the end of May by the club's Advisory Council, foresees the emergence of a new key player: the Raja sports company, with a capital of 250 million dirhams (MDH), of which 150 MDH will be injected by Marsa Maroc over three seasons.

In exchange, the port operator would hold 60% of the capital for 10 years, while the Raja association would retain 40% through the in-kind contribution of its assets (senior team, training center, and brand rights). This structure aims for a profound professionalization of the club's governance, with an independent board of directors, a separation between sporting and administrative functions, and a multi-year roadmap inspired by European club standards. Ultimately, the objective is to triple the club's turnover, increasing it from 100 to 300 MDH per year, according to projections put forward by Jawad Ziyat.

On 7 July 2025, after an eight-hour general assembly, Jawad Ziyat and Abdellah Biraouine passed the first round with 67 and 40 votes respectively, against 35 for Said Hasbane. The second round was won by Jawad Ziyat with 91 votes against 43, so that he was officially designated as president of the club. The Raja Parliament also unanimously approved the activation of the club's sports society and the partnership project with Marsa Maroc.

=== Partnership with Marsa Maroc ===
On 2 August 2025, Jawad Ziyat and Driss Agoujjim, CFO of Marsa Maroc and President of Ports4Impact, signed a strategic partnership for the activation of Raja Club Athletic S.A., with the presence of Fouzi Lekjaa. Ports4Impact, the entity responsible for Marsa Maroc's CSR policy, acquired a 60% stake in Raja, for a contribution of MAD 150 million spread over three years, while the Raja CA association retained 40% of the shares.

In 1987, the Office d’exploitation des ports (ODEP), Marsa Maroc's predecessor, launched its sponsorship of Raja, which has become, over the years, a strong commitment renewed each year that been continued by Marsa Maroc ever since. Ports4Impact specifies that this operation is not aimed at financial profitability, but rather reflects a desire to extend this historic alliance and contribute to the club's reconstruction, beyond any profit-making considerations. Should any profits be generated, they will be reinvested in full into the club.

Ports4Impact's role will be focused exclusively on fields in which Marsa Maroc has proven expertise and where it could add value in terms of governance. As the majority shareholder of Raja Club Athletic S.A., Ports4Impact will appoint its president, who will be responsible for overseeing the club's institutional management activities. Sporting management will continue to be handled by the association through its own governing bodies.

=== Disputes resolution ===
On 18 August 2025, the club announced that it had settled all its local and international disputes, which had resulted in bans on the registration of new players for the 2025–26 season. The club stated that MAD 31 million had been mobilized to settle 36 cases, also including pre-disputes, formal notices and termination protocols.

== Coaching staff ==
Position	Staff
Head coach	(South Africa) Fadlu Davids
Assistant coach	(South Africa) Darian Wilken
Assistant coach	(Morocco) Hicham Aboucherouane
First-team goalkeeping coach	(South Africa) Wayne Sandilands
First-team fitness coach	(South Africa) Durell Butler
First-team fitness coach	(Morocco) Charafeddine Mezzour
Performance analyst	(South Africa) Mueez Kajee
Performance analyst	(Morocco) Salaheddine Laaniba
First-team doctor	(Morocco) Dr. Hakim Ait Lahcen
Head Physiotherapist	(Morocco) Mustapha Jazouli
Match delegate	(Morocco) Mustapha Tantaoui

== Players ==
=== First-team squad ===
Notes:

- Players and squad numbers last updated on 31 January 2026. Age as of 30 June 2026.
- Flags indicate national team as has been defined under FIFA eligibility rules. Players may hold more than one non-FIFA nationality.

No.	Name	Nat.	Position	Date of Birth (Age)	Signed from
Goalkeepers
1	El Mehdi Al Harrar	(Morocco)	GK	30 November 2000 (aged 25)	(Morocco) Chabab Mohammédia
12	Khalid Kbiri Alaoui	(Morocco)	GK	28 June 1996 (aged 30)	(Morocco) OC Safi
32	Yassine Zoubir	(Morocco)	GK	24 February 2002 (aged 24)	(Morocco) Youth system
Defenders
4	Ismael Mokadem	(Morocco)	CB	26 July 1995 (aged 30)	(Saudi Arabia) Al Ula FC
5	Abdellah Khafifi	(Morocco)	CB	19 February 1993 (aged 33)	(Qatar) Umm Salal
13	Badr Benoun	(Morocco)	CB	30 September 1993 (aged 32)	Qatar SC
33	Mehdi Mchakhchekh	(Morocco)	CB	23 February 2004 (aged 22)	(Morocco) Youth system
17	Ayoub El Amloud	(Morocco)	RB / LB	8 April 1994 (aged 32)	(Bahrain) Al-Khaldiya
7	Mohamed Boulacsoute	(Morocco)	RB / RW / LW	23 September 1998 (aged 27)	(Morocco) Chabab Mohammédia
2	Abdelkrim Baadi	(Morocco)	LB / RB	16 April 1996 (aged 30)	(Morocco) RS Berkane
24	Amine Khammas	(Morocco)	LB	6 April 1999 (aged 27)	(Cyprus) Omonia Nicosia
Midfielders
26	Balla Moussa Conté	(Guinea)	DM / CM	15 April 2004 (aged 22)	(Tanzania) Young Africans
19	Othmane Chraibi	(Morocco)	DM / CM	21 February 2003 (aged 23)	(France) FC Metz
8	Hilal Ferdaoussi	(Morocco)	DM / CM / AM	23 June 1999 (aged 27)	(Morocco) Moghreb Tétouan
23	Mohamed Al Makahasi	(Morocco)	CM / DM	5 February 1995 (aged 31)	(Saudi Arabia) Al Wehda FC
6	Aymen Barkok	(Morocco)	CM / AM / DM	21 May 1998 (aged 28)	(Germany) Schalke 04
30	Besar Halimi	(Kosovo)	AM / CM	12 December 1994 (aged 31)	(Poland) Śląsk Wrocław
34	Sabir Bougrine	(Morocco)	AM / CM	10 July 1996 (aged 29)	(Tunisia) Espérance de Tunis
77	Adam Ennafati	(Morocco)	AM / LW / RW	29 June 1994 (aged 32)	(Morocco) AS FAR
Forwards
11	Ayoub Maamouri	(Morocco)	LW / RW	1 December 2000 (aged 25)	(Morocco) Olympique Dcheira
21	Mouad Dahak	(Morocco)	LW / AM	22 July 2005 (aged 20)	(Morocco) US Touarga
23	Pape Ousmane Sakho	(Senegal)	LW / RW / AM	21 December 1996 (aged 29)	(France) Quevilly-Rouen
27	Sharara	(Jordan)	RW / LW	30 December 1997 (aged 28)	(Jordan) Al-Ramtha
9	Ismail Khafi	(Morocco)	ST	19 September 1995 (aged 30)	(Kuwait) Qadsia SC
99	Mathias Oyewusi	(Nigeria)	ST	2 February 1999 (aged 27)	(Ukraine) Kolos Kovalivka

=== Out on loan ===
As of 31 January 2026

Note: Flags indicate national team as defined under FIFA eligibility rules; some limited exceptions apply. Players may hold more than one non-FIFA nationality.

No.	Pos.	Nation	Player
—	FW	MAR	Bilal Ould-Chikh (at FC Volendam until 30 June 2026)
—	DF	MAR	Bouchaib Arrassi (at Ararat-Armenia until 30 June 2026)
—	DF	MAR	Karim El Achqer (at Raja Beni Mellal until 30 June 2026)
—	FW	MAR	Anouar Aalam (at Raja Beni Mellal until 30 June 2026)

== Transfers ==
=== Contract extensions ===
Date	Pos'	Player	Contract ends	Ref.
10 June 2025	DF	(Morocco) Mohamed Boulacsoute	30 June 2027	
11 June 2025	MF	(Morocco) Sabir Bougrine	30 June 2027	
26 June 2025	DF	(Morocco) Abdellah Khafifi	30 June 2026	
30 June 2025	FW	(Morocco) Adam Ennafati	30 June 2027	

=== Transfers in ===
Date	Pos'	Player	Moving from	Fee	Ref.
17 May 2025	DF	(Morocco) Badr Benoun	Qatar SC	Free agent	
5 June 2025	MF	(Nigeria) Moses Orkuma	(Tunisia) US Monastir	Free agent	
10 July 2025	FW	(Bolivia) Víctor Ábrego	(Bolivia) Nacional Potosí	End of loan	
13 July 2024	MF	(Morocco) Mohamed Al Makahasi	(Saudi Arabia) Al Wehda FC	Free agent	
17 July 2025	GK	(Morocco) Khalid Kbiri Alaoui	OC Safi	€100 k	
24 July 2025	FW	(Morocco) Bilal Ould-Chikh	(Netherlands) FC Volendam	Free agent	
29 July 2025	MF	(Morocco) Othmane Chraibi	(France) FC Metz	Free agent	
6 August 2025	FW	(Morocco) Mouad Dahak	US Touarga	Loan	
16 August 2025	FW	(Morocco) Ismail Khafi	(Kuwait) Qadsia SC	€250 k	
21 August 2025	DF	(Morocco) Ismael Mokadem	(Saudi Arabia) Al Ula FC	Free agent	
4 January 2026	FW	(Nigeria) Mathias Oyewusi	(Ukraine) Kolos Kovalivka	Undisclosed	
5 January 2026	FW	(Jordan) Sharara	(Jordan) Al-Ramtha	€50 k	
7 January 2026	MF	(Morocco) Aymen Barkok	(Germany) Schalke 04	Free agent	
22 January 2026	DF	(Morocco) Amine Khammas	(Cyprus) Omonia Nicosia	Undisclosed	
28 January 2026	MF	(Kosovo) Besar Halimi	(Poland) Śląsk Wrocław	Free agent	
31 January 2026	DF	(Morocco) Ayoub El Amloud	(Bahrain) Al-Khaldiya	Undisclosed	
31 January 2026	MF	(Guinea) Balla Moussa Conté	(Tanzania) Young Africans	Loan	

=== Transfers out ===
Date	Pos'	Player	Moving to	Fee	Ref.
14 May 2025	ST	(Morocco) Abderahmane Soussi	Released	–	
14 May 2025	MF	(Equatorial Guinea) Federico Bikoro	Released	–	
14 May 2025	DF	(Guinea) Yasser Baldé	End of contract	–	
22 May 2025	DF	(Morocco) Benaissa Benamar	Released	–	
26 May 2025	ST	(Morocco) Houssine Rahimi	(United Arab Emirates) Al Ain FC	Free agent	
19 July 2025	FW	(Morocco) Marouane Zila	Released	–	
22 July 2025	DF	(Tunisia) Hani Amamou	Released	–	
6 August 2025	MF	(Mauritania) Mouhsine Bodda	Released	–	
25 August 2025	DF	(Morocco) Zakaria Labib	JS Soualem	Undisclosed	
13 January 2026	DF	(Morocco) Bouchaib Arrassi	Ararat-Armenia	Loan	
16 January 2026	FW	(Morocco) Younes Najari	Released	–	
20 January 2026	MF	(Bolivia) Víctor Ábrego	Released	–	
21 January 2026	FW	(Nigeria) Moses Orkuma	Released	–	
21 January 2026	DF	(Morocco) Youssef Belammari	(Egypt) Al Ahly	€600 k	
30 January 2025	FW	(Morocco) Bilal Ould-Chikh	(Netherlands) FC Volendam	Loan	

== Pre-season and friendlies ==
On 14 July, the team flew to Agadir for a two-week preparation camp with a friendly game against Hassania Agadir. On 24 August, the squad headed to Tangier for a final camp.

On 29 November, Raja announces the schedule of Raja Saudi Tour 2025. This preparation coincides with the break imposed by the 2025 Africa Cup of Nations. On 7 December 2025, the team will fly to Saudi Arabia to play two friendly games against Al-Ahli and Al Wehda.

Win Draw Loss Fixtures

12 July 2025 Friendly	Raja CA	1–1	Widad Temara	Bouskoura
12:00	Khouidssi	Report		Stadium: Raja CA Academy; Attendance: 0

25 July 2025 Friendly	Hassania Agadir	1–3	Raja CA	Agadir
18:00	Goal	Report	Ennafati 41'; Najari 63'; Ábrego 80'	Stadium: Adrar Stadium; Attendance: 0

2 August 2025 Friendly	Raja CA	1–0	US Bejaad	Bouskoura
18:00	Najari 30'	Report		Stadium: Raja CA Academy; Attendance: 0

9 August 2025 Friendly	Raja CA	3–1	Kawkab Marrakech	Bouskoura
17:00	Khafifi 30'; Ábrego 39'; Najari 65'	Report	El Bahraoui 20'	Stadium: Raja CA Academy; Attendance: 0

14 August 2025 Friendly	RCA Zemamra	1–0	Raja CA	Berrechid
18:00		Report		Stadium: Stade Municipal de Berrechid; Attendance: 0

24 August 2025 Friendly	US Yacoub El Mansour	0–0	Raja CA	Rabat
18:00		Report		Stadium: Rabat Olympic Stadium; Attendance: 0

30 August 2025 Friendly	Union Touarga	2–1	Raja CA	Tangier
18:00		Report	Khafi 60' (pen.)	Stadium: Ibn Batouta Stadium; Attendance: 0

6 September 2025 Friendly	Raja CA	3–2	Kenitra AC	Bouskoura
17:00	Khafi 8'; Maamouri 15'; Khafifi (red card) 30'; Benoun 90'	Report		Stadium: Raja CA Academy; Attendance: 0

29 November 2025 Friendly	Raja CA	2–0	US Yacoub El Mansour	Bouskoura
12:00	Khafifi 25'; Dahak 62'	Report		Stadium: Raja CA Academy; Attendance: 0

8 December 2025 Friendly	Al Wehda (Saudi Arabia)	2–0	(Morocco) Raja CA	Mecca, Saudi Arabia
17:00		Report		Stadium: Al Wehda Stadium; Attendance: 0

12 December 2025 Friendly	Al-Ahli (Saudi Arabia)	1–2	(Morocco) Raja CA	Jeddah, Saudi Arabia
17:20	Millot 6'	Report	Ennafati 29'; Sakho 44'	Stadium: Prince Mohammed Abdullah Al-Faisal Stadium; Attendance: 5000

27 December 2025 Friendly	Raja CA	1–0	Olympique Dcheira	Berrechid
11:00	Mokadem 35'	Report		Stadium: Berrechid Municipal Stadium; Attendance: 0

3 January 2026 Friendly	Raja CA	3–0	Moghreb Tétouan	Berrechid
11:30	Dahak 30'; Iguiz 55'; Arrassi 71'	Report		Stadium: Berrechid Municipal Stadium; Attendance: 0

9 January 2026 Friendly	Difaâ Hassani El Jadidi	0–1	Raja CA	El Jadida
13:30		Report	Iguiz 70'	Attendance: 0

12 January 2026 Friendly	Raja CA	0–2	Maghreb AS	Bouskoura
12:00		Report	Benjdida	Stadium: Raja CA Academy; Attendance: 0

12 January 2026 Friendly	Raja CA	2–1	Maghreb AS	Bouskoura
14:00	Maamouri; Essaadi	Report	Seakanyeng	Stadium: Raja CA Academy; Attendance: 0

16 January 2026 Friendly	Raja CA	2–1	Ittihad Tanger	Bouskoura
12:00	Oyewusi; Sharara	Report	Goal	Stadium: Raja CA Academy; Attendance: 0

== Competitions ==
=== Overview ===
Competition	First match	Last match	Starting round	Final position	Record							
Competition	First match	Last match	Starting round	Final position	Pld	W	D	L	GF	GA	GD	Win %
Botola	13 September 2025	TBD	Matchday 1	TBD	30	16	8	6	39	19	+20	53.33
Throne Cup	16 May 2026	TBD	Round of 32	TBD	1	1	0	0	2	0	+2	100.00
Total					31	17	8	6	41	19	+22	54.84

Last updated: 5 July 2026
Source: Sofascore

=== Botola ===
==== Results summary ====
Overall								Home						Away					
Pld	W	D	L	GF	GA	GD	Pts	W	D	L	GF	GA	GD	W	D	L	GF	GA	GD
30	16	8	6	40	19	+21	56	9	4	2	20	6	+14	7	4	4	20	13	+7

Source: Competitive matches

==== Results by round ====
Round	1	2	3	4	5	6	7	8	9	10	11	12	13	14	15	16	17	18	19	20	21	22	23	24	25	26	27	28	29	30
Ground	A	H	A	H	A	H	A	H	A	H	A	H	H	A	H	H	A	H	A	H	A	H	A	H	A	H	A	A	H	A
Result	W	D	W	D	W	D	D	W	D	W	L	D	W	W	W	W	L	W	W	L	W	L	L	D	W	W	L	D	W	W
Position	2	3	1	2	1	3	1	2	2	2	3	2	3	1	1	2	3	3	1	2	1	3	4	5	4	3	4	4	4	3

Updated to match(es) played on 5 July 2026. Source: Competitive matches
A = Away; H = Home; W = Win; D = Draw; L = Loss

==== Matches ====
The league fixtures were released on 20 July 2025.

13 September 2025 Round 1	Fath Union Sport	0–2	Raja CA	Kenitra
18:00	Moutaraji (red card) 85'	Report	Ennafati 45+2' (pen.); Khafifi 54'	Stadium: Kenitra Municipal Stadium; Attendance: 5000; Referee: Achraf Berrada

17 September 2025 Round 2	Raja CA	0–0	AS FAR	Casablanca
20:00		Report		Stadium: Stade Mohammed V Attendance: 45000; Referee: Mohsine Sourdi

28 September 2025 Round 3	Difaâ Hassani El Jadidi	0–2	Raja CA	Zemamra
16:00		Report	Lemzaouri 15' (o.g.); Khafi 69'	Stadium: Stade Ahmed Choukri; Attendance: 5000; Referee: Nabil Berkia

3 October 2025 Round 4	Raja CA	1–1	Maghreb de Fès	Casablanca
20:00	Najari 79'	Report	Benjdida 90+10' (pen.)	Stadium: Stade Mohammed V Attendance: 10000; Referee: Hicham Tamsamani

25 October 2025 Round 6	Raja CA	1–0	Olympique Dcheira	Casablanca
18:00	Ennafati 17'	Report		Stadium: Stade Mohammed V Attendance: 35000; Referee: El Hanafi Essaadi

29 October 2025 Round 5	Wydad AC	0–0	Raja CA	Casablanca
20:00		Report		Stadium: Stade Mohammed V Attendance: 45000; Referee: Mohamed El Baroudi

4 November 2025 Round 8	Raja CA	1–0	Kawkab Marrakech	Casablanca
20:00	Maamouri 90+8' (pen.)	Report		Stadium: Stade Mohammed V Attendance: 45000; Referee: Hicham Tamsamani

25 January 2026 Round 9	Union Touarga	1–1	Raja CA	Rabat
18:00	Dahmani 54'	Report	Boulacsoute (red card) 44'; Oyewusi 56'	Stadium: Al Medina Stadium; Attendance: 4000; Referee: Hamza Fareq

1 February 2026 Round 10	Raja CA	3–0	RCA Zemamra	Casablanca
18:00	Ennafati 25' 86' (pen.); Khafi 70'	Report		Stadium: Stade Mohammed V Attendance: 40000; Referee: Mohamed El Baroudi

8 February 2026 Round 11	COD Meknès	1–0	Raja CA	Meknès
20:00	Chraibi 71' (o.g.)	Report	Ennafati (penalty missed)	Stadium: Honneur Stadium; Attendance: 15000; Referee: Mohamed Lahouidri

13 February 2026 Round 12	Raja CA	0–0	US Yacoub El Mansour	Casablanca
20:00		Report		Stadium: Stade Mohammed V Referee: Yassin Bouslime

22 February 2026 Round 13	Raja CA	2–0	IR Tanger	Casablanca
22:00	Khafifi 25'; Iguiz 90+7'	Report	El Ouadghiri (red card) 27'	Stadium: Stade Mohammed V Attendance: 35000; Referee: Nawfal Nachit

25 February 2026 Round 7	RS Berkane	1–1	Raja CA	Berkane
22:00	Chouiar 70'	Report	Khafi 19'	Stadium: Stade Mohammed V Attendance: 10000; Referee: Said Boujidi

1 March 2026 Round 14	Hassania Agadir	0–1	Raja CA	Agadir
22:00		Report	Oyewusi 14'	Stadium: Stade Adrar; Attendance: 15000; Referee: Mohamed El Baroudi

7 March 2026 Round 15	Raja CA	2–0	OC Safi	Casablanca
22:00	Khafifi 11'; Benoun (penalty missed); Boulacsoute 77'	Report	El Moudane (red card) 26'	Stadium: Stade Mohammed V Attendance: 45000; Referee: Hamza El Fareq

26 April 2026 Round 16	Raja CA	4–1	Fath Union Sport	Casablanca
18:00	Ennafati 13'; Sakho 41'; El Mahasni 57' (o.g.); Sharara 76'	Report	Faidi (red card) 88'	Stadium: Stade Mohammed V Attendance: 45000; Referee: Hicham Temsamani

30 April 2026 Round 17	AS FAR	2–1	Raja CA	Rabat
18:00	Hadraf 52'; Slim 65'	Report	Ennafati 78' (pen.)	Stadium: Prince Moulay Abdellah Stadium; Attendance: 40000; Referee: Azzedine Boulfaid

3 May 2026 Round 18	Raja CA	1–0	Difaâ Hassani El Jadidi	Casablanca
18:00	El Amloud 14'	Report	El Idrissi (yellow card) 75' (yellow-red card) 90+3'	Stadium: Stade Mohammed V Attendance: 0 Referee: Achraf Berrada

6 May 2026 Round 19	Maghreb de Fès	0–2	Raja CA	Fez
21:00		Report	Oyewusi 19'; El Amloud 53'	Stadium: Fez Stadium; Attendance: 45000; Referee: Amine El Maataoui

9 May 2026 Round 20	Raja CA	0–1	Wydad AC	Casablanca
20:00		Report	Bakasu 39'	Stadium: Stade Mohammed V Attendance: 0 Referee: Hamza El Fareq

26 May 2026 Round 21	Olympique Dcheira	0–1	Raja CA	Agadir
16:00		Report	Sharara 45+1'; Khafi (yellow card) 87' (yellow-red card) 90+4'	Stadium: Stade Adrar; Attendance: 1000; Referee: Nawfal Nachit

3 June 2026 Round 22	Raja CA	0–1	RS Berkane	Casablanca
21:00		Report	Bassène 76' (red card) 79'	Stadium: Stade Mohammed V Attendance: 45000; Referee: Mohamed El Baroudi

9 June 2026 Round 23	Kawkab Marrakech	2–0	Raja CA	Marrakesh
18:00	El Janati 78' (pen.); Sallami 90+1'	Report		Stadium: Marrakesh Stadium; Attendance: 30000

14 June 2026 Round 24	Raja CA	1–1	Union Touarga	Casablanca
16:00	Halimi 83'	Report	Bammou 57'	Stadium: Stade Mohammed V Attendance: 30000; Referee: Said Boujidi

17 June 2026 Round 25	RCA Zemamra	3–4	Raja CA	Zemamra
16:00	Zidani 27'; Tahiri 32'; Moutouali 90+2' (pen.)	Report	Bougrine 13'; Laftah 22'; El Amloud 65'; Halimi 87'	Stadium: Stade Ahmed Choukri; Attendance: 2000; Referee: Mouhcine Sourdy

21 June 2026 Round 26	Raja CA	2–1	COD Meknès	Casablanca
15:00	Barkok 43'; Sakho 81' (red card) 88'	Report	Bounaga (red card) 45'; Daoui 22'	Stadium: Stade Mohammed V Attendance: 30000; Referee: Yassin Bouslime

25 June 2026 Round 27	US Yacoub El Mansour	2–1	Raja CA	Rabat
18:00	Fati 45+3'; Mrabet 56'	Report	Oyewusi 10'	Stadium: Rabat Olympic Stadium; Attendance: 2000

28 June 2026 Round 28	IR Tanger	1–1	Raja CA	Tangier
18:00	El Ouadghiri 90+1'	Report	Khafifi 44' (pen.)	Stadium: Stade Ibn Batouta; Attendance: 2000

2 July 2026 Round 29	Raja CA	2–0	Hassania Agadir	Casablanca
18:00	El Amloud 80' (pen.); Iguiz 90+8'	Report		Stadium: Stade Mohammed V Attendance: 20000

5 July 2026 Round 30	OC Safi	0–2	Raja CA	Safi
18:00		Report	Khafifi 38'; Khafi 64'	Stadium: Stade El Massira; Attendance: 1000

=== Throne Cup ===
16 May 2026 Round of 32	Raja CA	2–0	JS Massira	Casablanca
19:00	Khafi 45'; Mchakhchekh 70'	Report		Stadium: Stade Mohammed V Attendance: 0 Referee: Salman Atif

Round of 16	Hassania Agadir	–	Raja CA	Agadir
:				Stadium: Stade Adrar

== Squad information ==
=== Goals ===
Includes all competitive matches. The list is sorted alphabetically by surname when total goals are equal.

Rank	Pos.	Player	Botola	Throne Cup	Total
1	FW	(Morocco) Adam Ennafati	6	0	6
2	FW	(Morocco) Ismail Khafi	4	1	5
3	DF	(Morocco) Abdellah Khafifi	5	0	5
4	FW	(Nigeria) Mathias Oyewusi	4	0	4
5	DF	(Morocco) Ayoub El Amloud	4	0	4
6	FW	(Jordan) Sharara	2	0	2
7	MF	(Kosovo) Besar Halimi	2	0	2
8	FW	(Senegal) Pape Ousmane Sakho	2	0	2
9	FW	(Morocco) Yahia Iguiz	2	0	2
10	MF	(Morocco) Sabir Bougrine	1	0	1
11	MF	(Morocco) Aymen Barkok	1	0	1
12	FW	(Morocco) Ayoub Maamouri	1	0	1
13	DF	(Morocco) Mohamed Boulacsoute	1	0	1
14	DF	(Morocco) Mehdi Mchakhchekh	0	1	1
15	FW	(Morocco) Azzedine Laftah	1	0	1
16	FW	(Morocco) Younes Najari	1	0	1
Own goals			2	0	2
Total			39	2	41

=== Assists ===
Rank	Pos.	Player	Botola	Throne Cup	Total
1	MF	(Morocco) Mohamed Makahasi	4	0	4
2	MF	(Morocco) Sabir Bougrine	4	0	4
3	FW	(Morocco) Adam Ennafati	3	0	3
4	MF	(Morocco) Aymen Barkok	2	0	2
5	DF	(Morocco) Ayoub El Amloud	2	0	2
6	FW	(Jordan) Sharara	2	0	2
7	DF	(Morocco) Mohamed Boulacsoute	1	0	1
8	DF	(Morocco) Abdellah Khafifi	1	0	1
9	DF	(Morocco) Amine Khammas	1	0	1
10	FW	(Morocco) Mouad Dahak	1	0	1
11	FW	(Morocco) Ismail Khafi	1	0	1
12	DF	(Morocco) Othmane Chraibi	1	0	1
13	MF	(Kosovo) Besar Halimi	0	1	1
14	FW	(Morocco) Bilal Ould-Chikh	1	0	1
Total			24	1	25

=== Clean sheets ===
No.	Player	Botola	Throne Cup	Total
1	(Morocco) El Mehdi Al Harrar	14	0	14
32	(Morocco) Yassine Zoubir	2	0	2
12	(Morocco) Khalid Kbiri Alaoui	0	1	1
Total		16	1	17
