= Jawad Ziyat =

Moroccan businessman, president of Raja CA

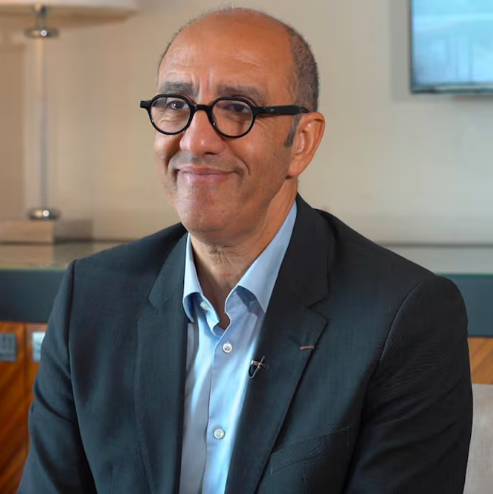
- Jawad Ziyat in 2025

President of Raja CA
- Incumbent
- Assumed office 7 July 2025
- Preceded by: Abdellah Biraouine
- In office 13 September 2018 – 14 December 2020
- Preceded by: Mohamed Aouzal
- Succeeded by: Rachid Andaloussi
- Born: Jawad Ziyat; 1967 (age 58–59); Rabat, Morocco
- Education: Joseph Fourier University; Supélec
- Occupations: Businessman, civil engineer, sports club president
- Known for: President of Raja CA
- Board member of: Chairman of Injaz Holding; Chairman of Jet4you (former); Deputy director of Addoha Group (former)

Jawad Ziyat (Arabic: جواد الزيات), born in Rabat in 1967, is a Moroccan businessman, CEO of Injaz Holding, and the president of football club Raja CA.

After completing his studies at Joseph Fourier University and Supélec, he began his career in 1991 at Procter & Gamble, before joining the Ministry of Tourism in 1997. In 2005, he chaired Jet4you, the country's first low-cost airline, before joining the board of directors of the Addoha Group in 2008. In 2016, he founded Injaz Holding.

He joined Raja CA as a member in 2005, joined Abdellah Rhallam's board in 2008, and then became vice-president of Abdesalam Hanat in 2010. He returned in 2018 to the interim committee headed by Mohamed Aouzal. He was unanimously elected on 13 September 2018. Under his presidency, the club won the Confederation Cup, the CAF Super Cup, and its first Botola in seven years. In 2019, the club announced a net profit of MAD 6 million, for the first time since 2015. Faced with financial difficulties related to the COVID-19 pandemic, he resigned in December 2020, replaced by Rachid Andaloussi.

In June 2025, Ziyat announced his candidacy for the presidency of Raja. He is bringing a structuring project to activate the Raja SA sports company, increase its budget through a strategic partnership with Marsa Maroc, and professionalize its governance. On 7 July 2025, he was elected president of the club.

== Early life and education ==
Jawad Ziyat was born in 1967 in Rabat to civil servant parents from Taza. He obtained his baccalaureate in 1985 at the Lycée Descartes, before moving to France where he obtained a master's degree in physics from the Joseph-Fourier University in Grenoble in 1989 followed by an engineering degree from the École supérieure d'électricité-Supélec in 1991.

== Career ==
=== Public sector ===
In 1991, Jawad Ziyat began his career as head of detergent production for the American multinational Procter & Gamble, managing 70 people and a budget of MAD 20 million, before moving into marketing, where he launched successful brands such as Pampers and Ace.

In November 1997, he was appointed Director of Development and Investments at the Ministry of Tourism, where he was responsible for leading structural projects aimed at strengthening the Kingdom's tourist appeal, where he participated in the "Vision 2010" strategy. He also served as vice-president of Agadir and Tangier Bay Development Companies between 1997 and 2005, and headed the negotiating committee with tour operators.

=== Jet4you and Addoha ===
In May 2005 he decided to return to the private sector. In August 2005, he was appointed Chairman of Jet4you's executive board, a newly created low-cost Moroccan airline. He was responsible for establishing and structuring this company in a highly competitive sector. Under his leadership, Jet4you enjoyed a rapid launch, with a strategy focused on democratizing air travel for Moroccans and connecting the country with several European destinations.

In 2008, he joined Addoha Group, one of Morocco's real estate giants, as managing director in charge of the Group's Luxury Business Unit. He held other management positions during a period of strong expansion in the real estate sector.

=== Businessman ===
In January 2016, he decided to branch out on his own, creating Injaz Holding Group. This company positions itself as a diversified player, operating in strategic consulting, project development and investment. This initiative reflects Jawad Ziyat's desire to capitalize on his experience to lead his own projects and support other organizations in their growth.

He partnered with two steel operators to create With Steel, a company specializing in metal construction. In two years, the company had already generated a revenue of MAD 20 million. His projects include the expansion of the factory of Pepsi in Bouskoura, the factory of Petit Forestier, a European leader in refrigeration, and the Fairmont Hotel in Rabat.

In May 2021, he co-founded the courier service VotreColis.ma with Ismael Belkhayat, the brother of Moncef Belkhayat, and Khalid Chami, chairman of the supervisory board of Société Générale Maroc.

In 2022, Jawad Ziyat got into real estate development by creating Orion 1091 with the CEO of Aveo Energie, Mehdi Abderrahmani Ghorfi. The two men are represented in the Orion 1091 board through Onyxam (1 share out of 1000), 50% owned by Injaz Holding, the other half being divided between Next Ventures and Artemis Invest, both under the umbrella of Ghorfi (999 shares).

== Raja CA ==
In 2005, he became a member of Raja Club Athletic. He joined Abdellah Rhallam's board in 2008 before becoming vice-president under Abdesalam Hanat in 2010. Raja won the 2010–11 Botola before Ziyat resigned.

=== First term ===
On 13 April 2018, following the resignation of Said Hasbane, he joined Mohamed Aouzal's interim committee. On 2 May 2018, Fathi Jamal was appointed sporting director. Their decisions were highly successful in the first months, with the reopening of the club's training center in the Oasis complex. In August, with the elective assembly scheduled for September 13, Ziyat was tipped to run for the club presidency with the support of the advisory council, better known as the « wise council ».

On 13 September, he became president of Raja Club Athletic and promised to continue the work of the interim committee. On 12 October, he announced the composition of his board of directors. On 2 December 2018, King Mohammed VI congratulated him in a phone call after Raja's win in the 2018 Confederation Cup final. On 29 March 2019, the Greens won their second African Super Cup.

Jawad Ziyat revealed his ambitions for the next season during his first summer transfer window. Mohsine Moutouali, Sanad Al Warfali, Fabrice Ngoma, Omar Arjoune, Ben Malango and Hamid Ahaddad were welcomed at the Oasis. The supporters also showed up; they broke the national record for the number of annual subscriptions with 13,000 units.

On 17 October 2019, the committee presented the financial report for the 2018–2019 season, which showed a positive net result of 6 million dirhams, for the first time since 2015. The club's members unanimously voted for the resolution authorizing the Ziyat committee to proceed with the creation of the public limited company in the form recommended by the Federation. In September 2020, the company was created, with the Raja CA association retaining its position as the main shareholder with 2,984 shares.

On 11 October 2020, Raja won its 12th Botola title in the final moments after an epic scenario.

On 5 November, Jawad Ziyat informed his board of his decision to resign for his position He explained this decision by the financial difficulties linked to the COVID-19 pandemic, which he was unable to manage. On December 14, he resigned, and Rachid Andaloussi succeeded him as interim president in accordance with Chapter 4 of the club's statutes.

In September 2024, as the club prepared to hold its next election meeting following the arrest of Mohamed Boudrika, Ziyat denied any intention of running for president. He told Le Site Info: "The real problem lies in the delay in implementing the sports society model. The association system is no longer suited to the management of Moroccan clubs. It is inconceivable that Raja should change its president every season. We must move to a new stage, open the door to investors, and develop a five or ten-year action plan." He added: "Raja's problem is primarily structural; maintaining the association system would cost Raja between 30 and MAD 40 million each season.".

=== Second term ===
On 26 June 2025, Jawad Ziyat officially announced his candidacy for the presidency of Raja CA, facing off against two other candidates, Abdellah Biraouine and Said Hasbane. The announcement was expected, as the club was preparing to take a major step in its restructuring with the activation of its S.A. company. He told Médias 24 that his first objective was to successfully launch the strategic partnership with Marsa Maroc. This project, unveiled at the end of May by the club's advisory council, foresees the rise of a new key player: the Raja sports company, with a capital of MAD 250 million, of which 150 million will be injected by Marsa Maroc. In exchange, the port operator would hold 60% of the capital for 10 years, while the Raja association would retain 40% through the in-kind contribution of its assets (senior team, training center, and brand rights). This structure aims for a profound professionalization of the club's governance, with an independent board of directors, a separation between sporting and administrative functions, and a multi-year roadmap inspired by European club standards. Ultimately, the goal is to triple the club's revenue, increasing it from 100 to 300 MAD million per year, according to projections put forward by Jawad Ziyat.

On 7 July 2025, Jawad Ziyat was elected the new president of Raja CA after more than eight hours of a general assembly marked by heated debates and palpable tensions, which was followed by more than 5 million viewers on streaming platforms, a record. In the first round, he collected 67 votes against 40 for Abdellah Biraouine and 35 for Said Hasbane, before winning the second round against Biraouine with 91 votes against 43. The Raja Parliament also unanimously voted to activate the Raja S.A. and the partnership project with Marsa Maroc. Ziyat took the stage to spoke briefly: "This is a new era for Raja, where success will be constant. And I promise you to place Raja on the African podium for a very long time."

On 2 August 2025, Jawad Ziyat and Driss Agoujjim, CFO of Marsa Maroc and President of Ports4Impact, signed a strategic partnership for the activation of Raja Club Athletic S.A., with the presence of Fouzi Lekjaa. Ports4Impact, the entity responsible for Marsa Maroc's CSR policy, acquired a 60% stake in Raja, for a contribution of MAD 150 million spread over three years, while the Raja CA association retained 40% of the shares. In 1987, the Office d’exploitation des ports (ODEP), Marsa Maroc's predecessor, launched its sponsorship of Raja, which has become, over the years, a strong commitment renewed each year that been continued by Marsa Maroc ever since. Ports4Impact specifies that this operation is not aimed at financial profitability, but rather reflects a desire to extend this historic alliance and contribute to the club's reconstruction, beyond any profit-making considerations. Should any profits be generated, they will be reinvested in full into the club. Ports4Impact's role will be focused exclusively on fields in which Marsa Maroc has proven expertise and where it could add value in terms of governance. As the majority shareholder of Raja Club Athletic S.A., Ports4Impact will appoint its president, who will be responsible for overseeing the club's institutional management activities. Sporting management will continue to be handled by the association through its own governing bodies.

On 18 August 2025, the club announced that it had settled all its local and international disputes, which had resulted in bans on the registration of new players for the 2025–26 season. The club stated that MAD 31 million had been mobilized to settle 36 cases, also including pre-disputes, formal notices and termination protocols.

== Honours ==
- Botola
  - 2019–20, runner-up 2018–19
- CAF Confederation Cup
  - 2018
- CAF Super Cup
  - 2019
