= Raja-Oasis Sports Complex =

Raja CA training centre

- المركب الرياضي الوازيس
- Oasis
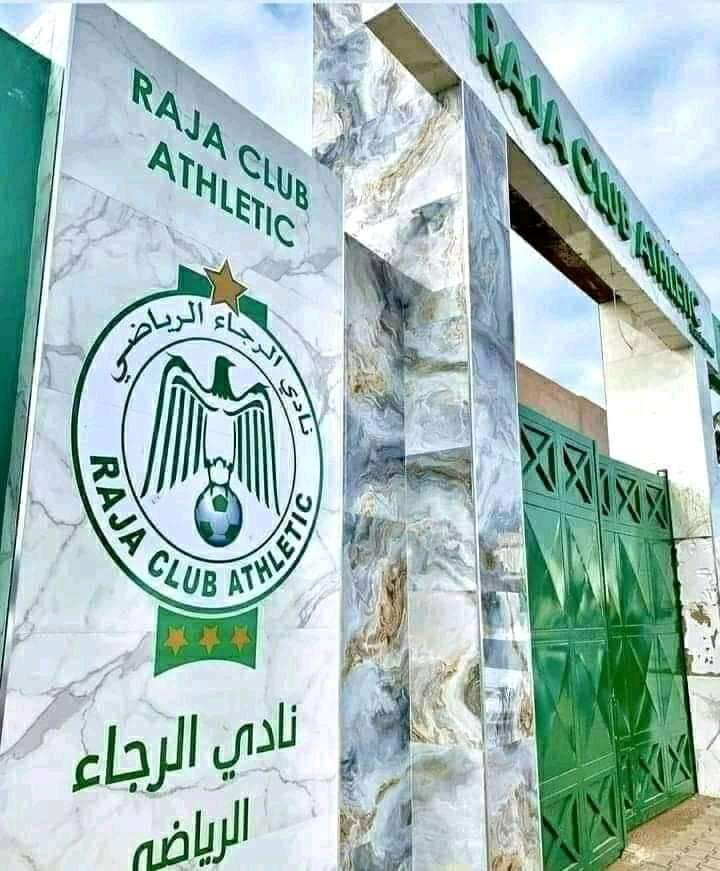
- Raja-Oasis Sports Complex, the training ground of Raja CA
- Interactive map of Raja-Oasis Sports Complex
- Location: Oasis, Casablanca
- Coordinates: 33.560851°N 7.649832°W
- Owner: Raja Club Athletic
- Type: Sports training facility
- Surface: Grass pitches (1); Synthetic turf (2)

Construction
- Built: 1929-1932
- Opened: 1932
- Renovated: 1981, 1993, 1999, 2004; 2010, 2018

Tenant
- Raja CA youth teams

The Raja-Oasis Sports Complex (or simply Oasis Complex) is the training ground and academy headquarters of Moroccan football club Raja Club Athletic. Opened in 1932, the complex is located southwest of Casablanca, in the Oasis neighborhood, about 24 km away from Mohammed V International Airport.

The complex includes the training centre for the first team, the women's team and the youth teams as well as the player-development centre in association with Raja CA Academy located in Bouskoura.

It was one of the first football centres to comply with international standards in Africa, and the first Moroccan academy to adopt the "sport-study" system that combine both football and education. It was chosen by the technical direction of the Royal Moroccan Football Federation as the best club training centre in 2021.

On 20 October 2023, the club announced the complete renovation of the Complex before 2025.

== History ==
The Raja-Oasis Sports Complex opened in 1932 under the name of the Stade de l'aviation in the Cité des sports (the current Oasis district), in Casablanca. This district included the Stade Père Jégo, the Stade de l'USA (Mohamed Benjelloun Complex now), the Stade de l'ASPTT and the Stade de l'Étoile de Casablanca.

During the French Protectorate, Raja CA had no permanent ground where to train, they used the Stade L'hwiyet (which means pony wall in Arabic) located in Avenue 2 Mars, the Stade Jrid or sometimes in the Stade de la Jeunesse, all located in Derb Sultan. The headquarters of the club was located in Grigouane, n°122 5th street, Derb Sultan.

The Stade de l'aviation was owned by USM Casablanca which moved from the Stade Philip, and built its own sports centre there where the first team and the other youth teams trained. After the dissolution of USM in 1957 and the liquidation of its assets, Raja gained the right to use the Complex thanks to Abdelkader Jalal and Boujemaâ Kadri, then Secretary-general of the club.

The complex will then be definitively acquired and named Raja-Oasis Sports Complex. When it was inaugurated, the stadium had a covered stand with a capacity of 4,000 seats as well as two pitches, one grass and one clay. The complex had the nickname "Zaouïa" because of the green color and the traditional Moroccan architecture of the gate. In its early years, the infrastructure was somewhat sketchy with mostly prefabricated buildings.

For more than twenty years, the complex was not modified until 1981 when a major renovation project was launched. The work lasted nearly two years and the complex reopened in 1983 during the presidency of Abdellah Ferdaous. After the 1981–82 Throne Cup won by Raja, the club decided to move from Derb Sultan to Oasis in 1983.

In 1993, the Complex will be modernized for the first time by Abdellah Rhallam, with the construction of many facilities including wall around the complex, a new gym, and a building for the management board.

Between 1992 and 1998, the club focused its strategy on the development of young players and went for the creation of a modern training centre. The construction began in 1998 and cost more than 1,6 million dirhams. The centre was officially inaugurated by Ahmed Ammor in 1999.

In 2009, floodlights were added to permit night training and to reinforce security around the complex. The following year, the training centre underwent improvements, and a new synthetic turf was added during an opening ceremony on 11 November 2010 with the Minister of Youth and Sports, Moncef Belkhayat, Mohamed Aouzal and Abdessalam Hanat, then president of the club.

== Facilities ==
=== Infrastructure ===
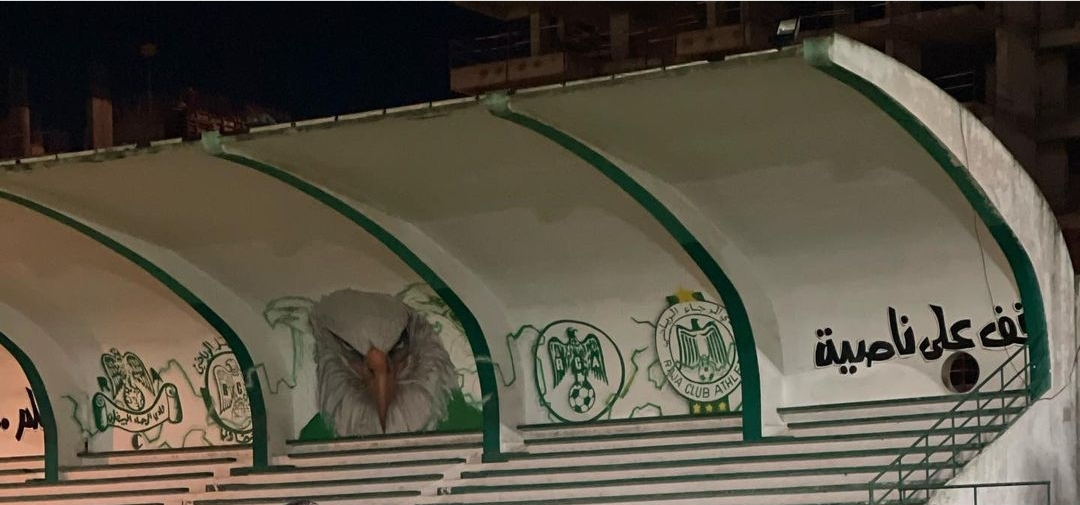
The stand A

During Abdelhamid Souiri term between 2004 and 2007, the training centre was renovated in 2004 under the supervision of architect Rachid Andaloussi, then a member of the board. The new development centre was divided into two floors, it consisted of 26 bedrooms, 2 equipped relaxation rooms, a gym, a classroom and a meeting room. The centre is also equipped with offices for managers, the director, the secretariat and the medical staff.

Two stands are available for supporters wishing to visit the complex or attend a match, one near the first pitch with a capacity of around 4000 seats, and the second next to the other two pitches that has a capacity of 5000. Supporters are allowed to attend practices on some special occasions.

But after years of neglect, the development centre will close during the 2013–14 season and it is finally Andaloussi who will once again take charge of its renovation which began in 2018 under the newly elected president, Jawad Ziyat. This renovation involved changing rooms, accommodation, catering, leisure and administrative facilities.

On 6 October 2019, the centre reopens its doors. The work took a year and cost over 1,6 million dirhams. The centre has been expanded to reach the capacity of 54 beds and the sports infrastructure dedicated to young footballers were developed.

After its opening in September 2022, Raja CA Academy began to host some youth teams in association with the Oasis complex.

On 20 October 2023, the club announced the complete renovation of the complex. This decision is assisted by the City Conseil project of the redevelopment of eight stadiums in Casablanca after Morocco gained the hosting of the 2025 Africa Cup of Nations and the 2030 World Cup.

=== Education ===
In 1999, Raja was the first Moroccan club to offer to its young players, that were chosen after selection, a sporting and educational program in Raja-Oasis Sports Complex. This education was provided by the Office for Skills Training and the Promotion of Work (OFPPT) thanks to a partnership with the club. The first generation consisted of 26 selected players, aged between 16 and 17. They had six hours of lessons and two hours of training a day. During the school holidays, they had to follow two training sessions a day.

In 2018, several agreements were signed with specialized establishments to ensure a quality school and sports project for the young athletes. Therefore, they benefit from a special status that allows them to practice football with flexible class schedule. They also benefit from permanent medical monitoring.

== Board ==
Development strategies of Raja have long been run by Abdelkader Jalal, a former Raja player between 1949 and 1954 and its main head of player development from 1950 until 1989, retiring only after an accident that occurred in 23 May and cost him his left hand.

After the opening of the development centre in 1999, the management was given to experienced coaches who were former Raja players like Fathi Jamal, Mhamed Fakhir or Mohamed Madih, in charge of physical preparation. Abdelhadi Belkorchi and Abdellatif Mejdoub were respectively in charge of equipment and boarding school master.

The function will then be occupied by several former players like Mohamed Nejmi, who will remain until July 2005. Abdellatif Jrindou held the position from 14 March 2021 to 21 September 2021.

The club annually allocates a budget of approximately 4 millions dirhams to the training centre, in order to provide for all the needs necessary for these players, supervised by a technical and administrative staff.

== Gallery ==
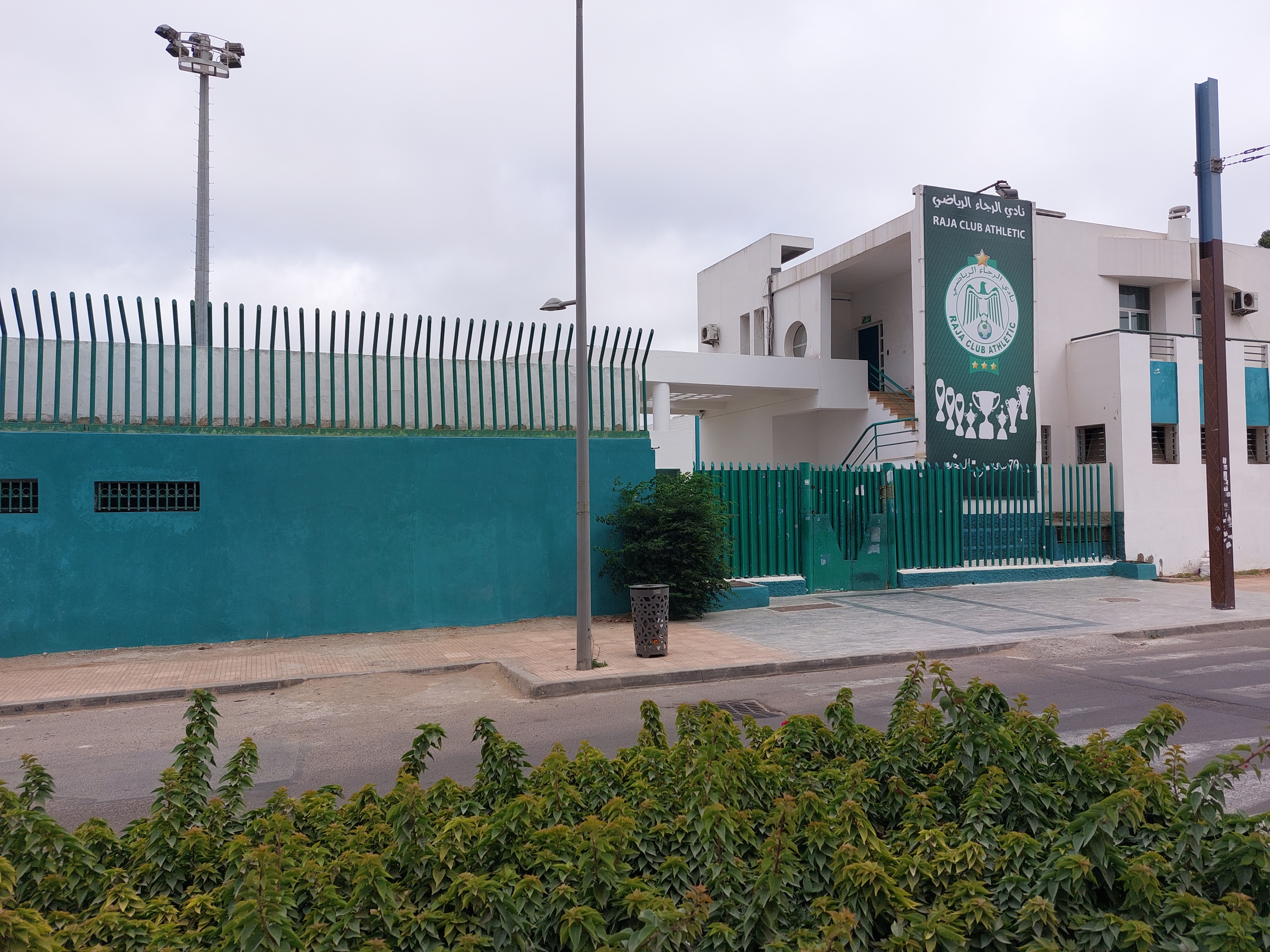
The main gate

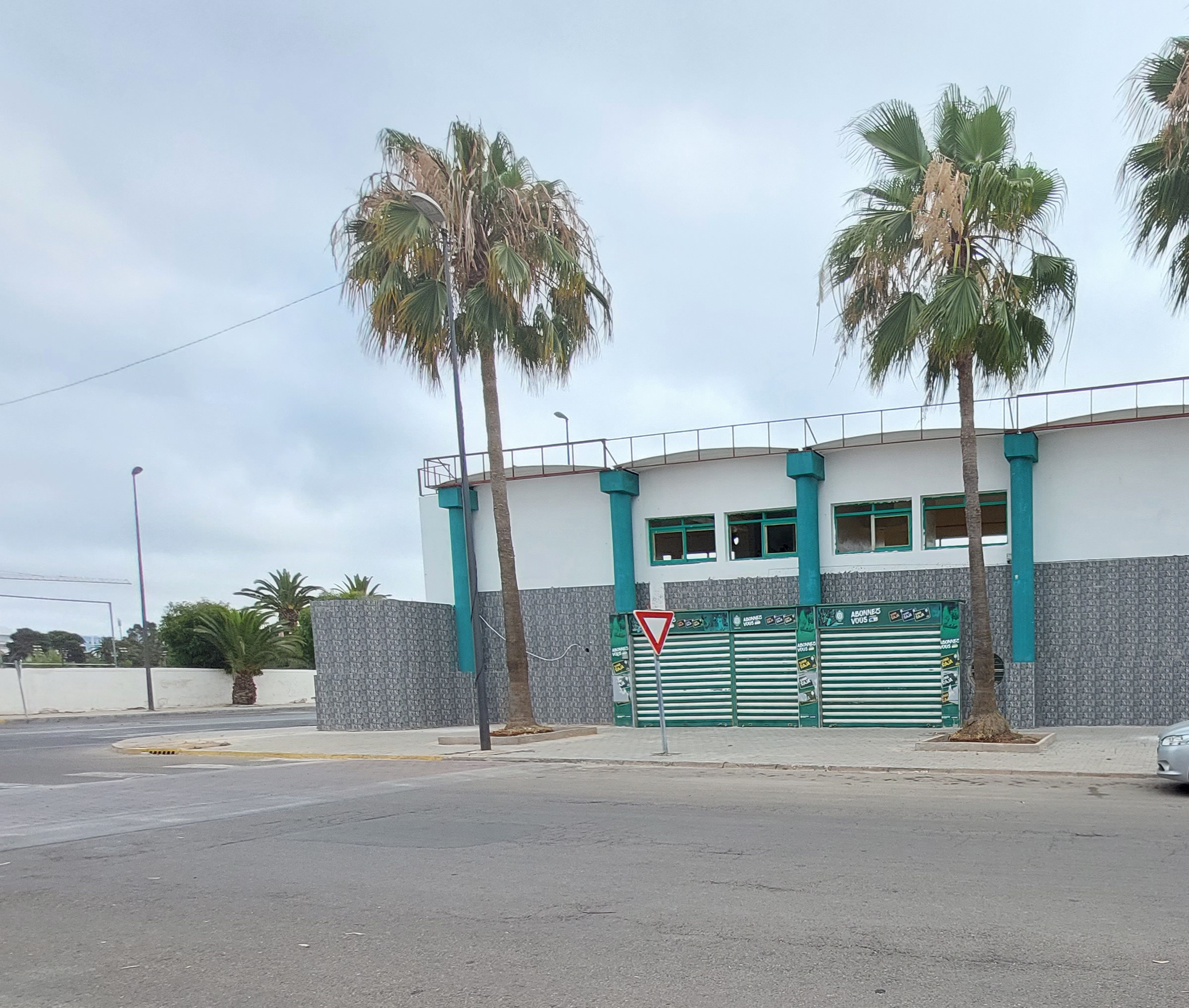
RajaStore.

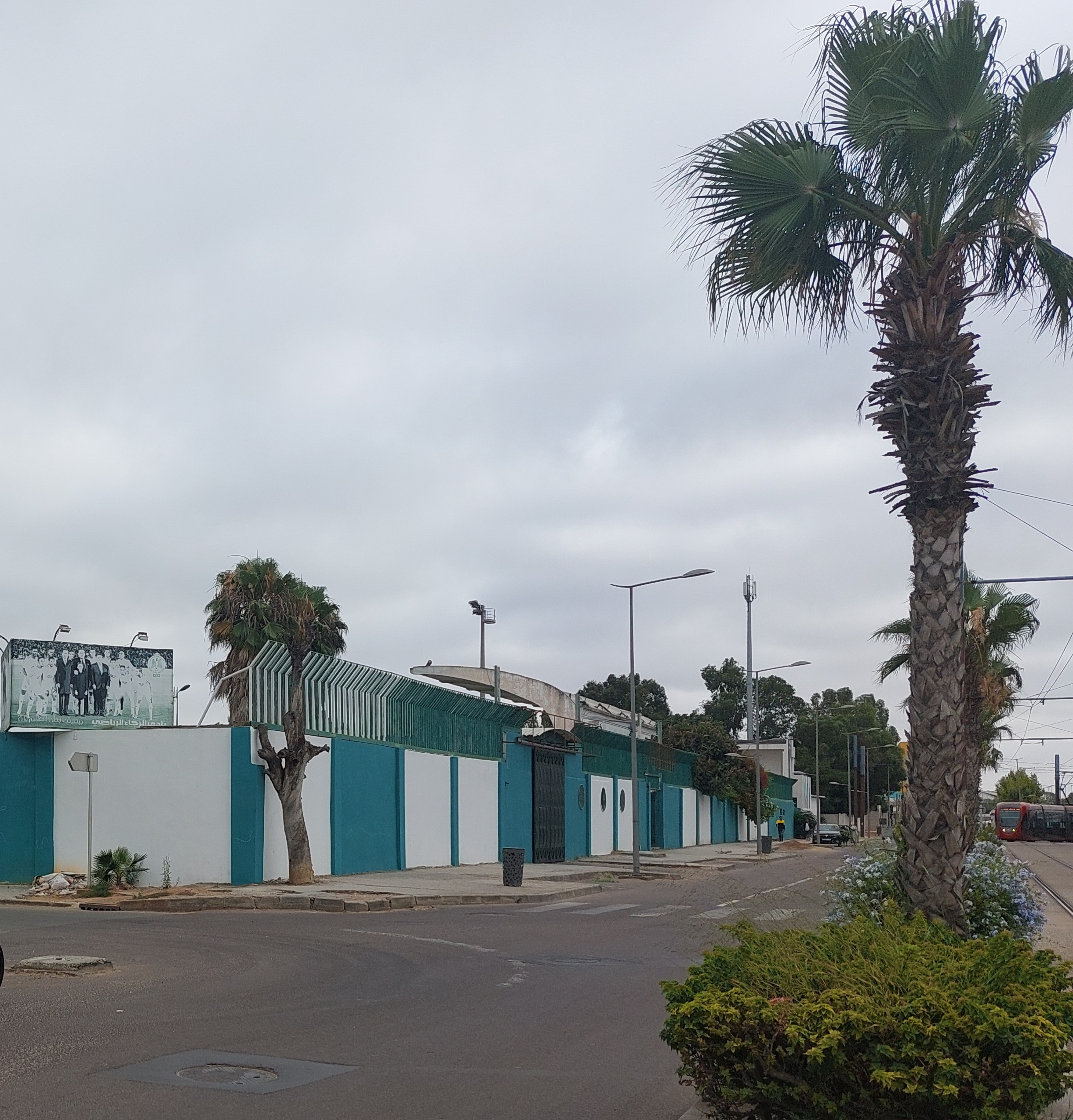
The Complex and the Tramway.

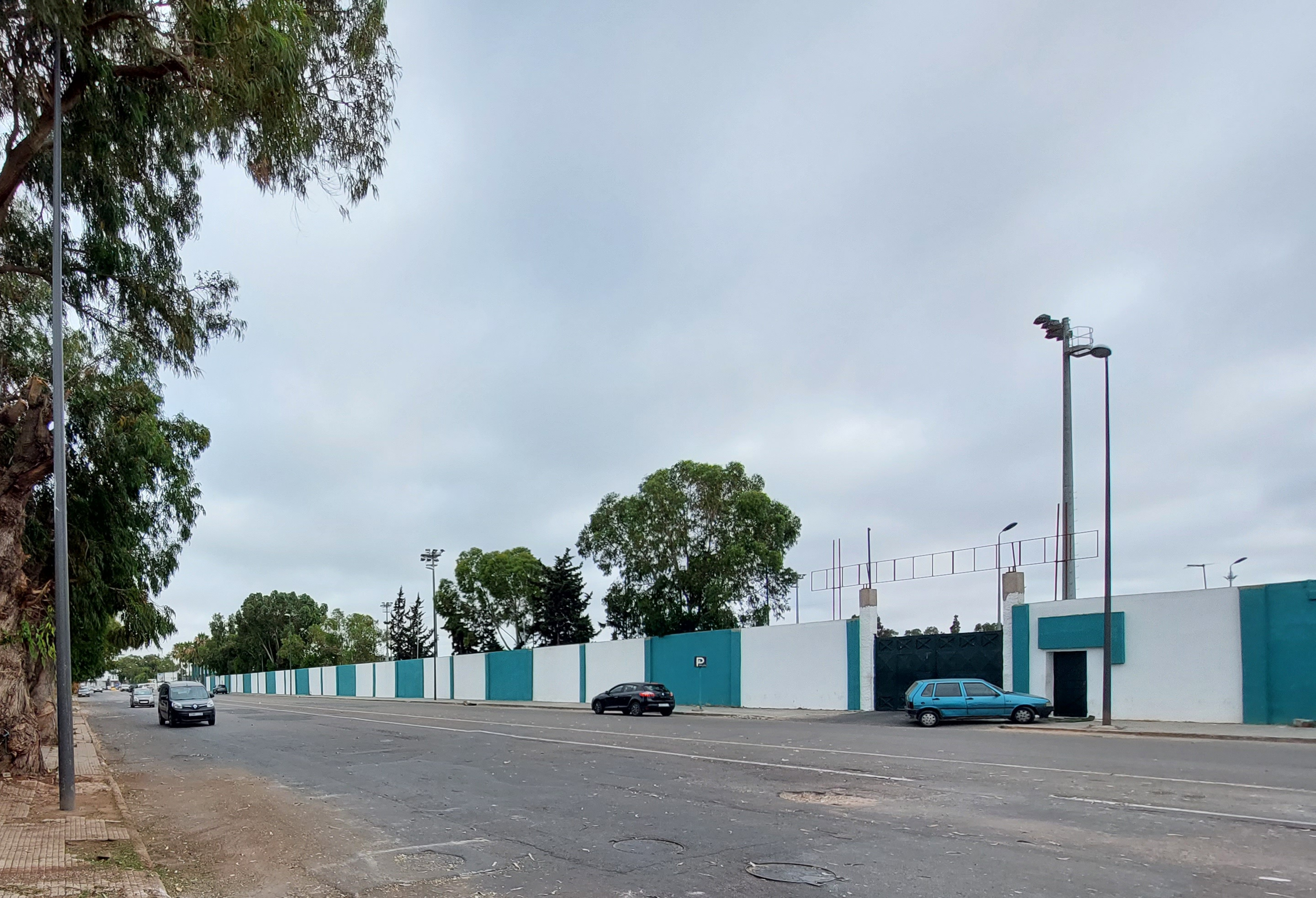
The west wall.

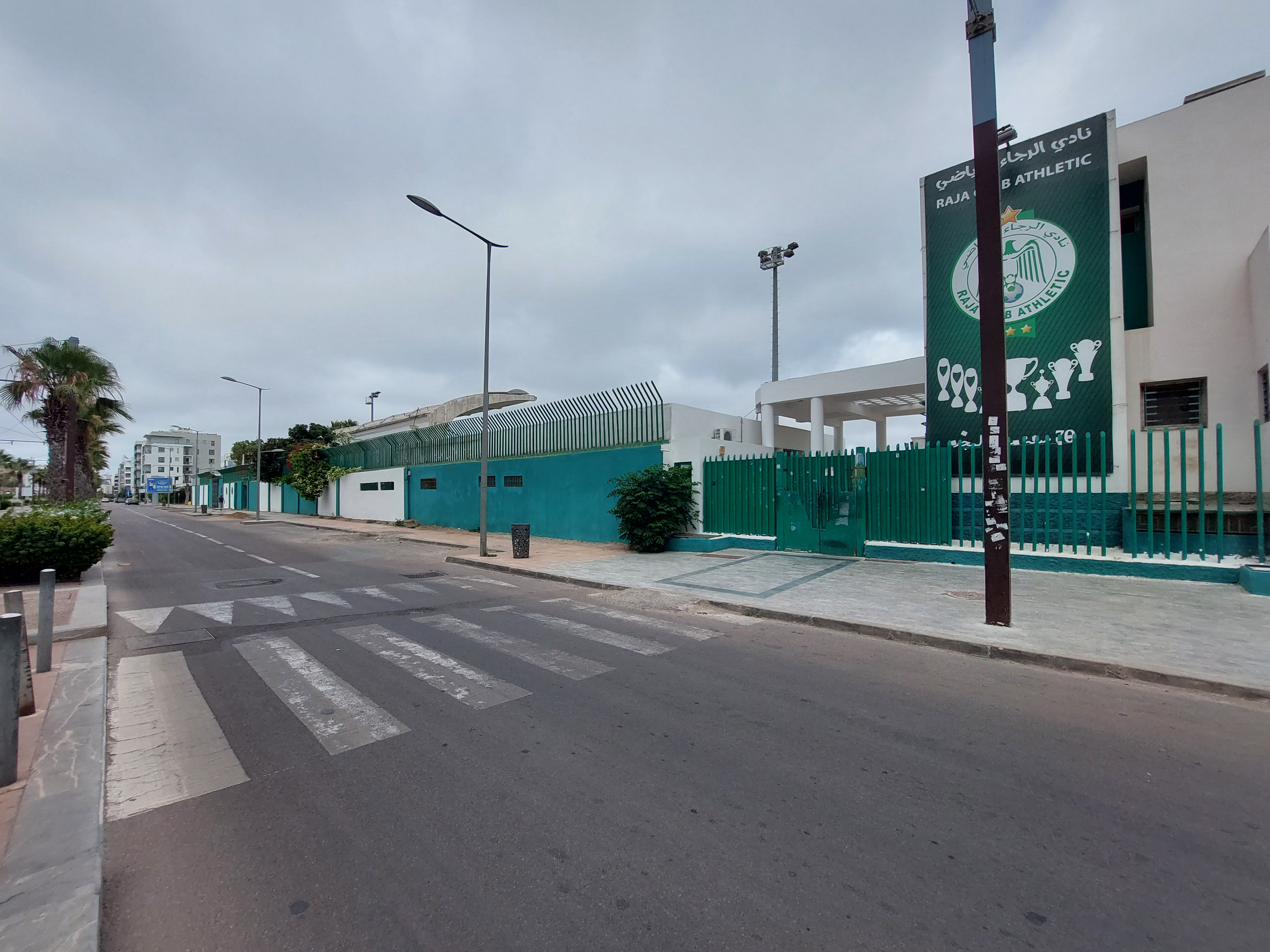
Boulevard Omar Al Khayam.
