= Bouchaib Arrassi =

Moroccan professional footballer

Personal information
- Full name: Bouchaib Arrassi
- Date of birth: 6 January 2000 (age 26)
- Place of birth: Casablanca, Morocco
- Height: 1.86 m (6 ft 1 in)
- Position: Centre-back

Team information
- Current team: Raja CA

Youth career
- –2019: Raja CA
- 2019–2021: SCC Mohammédia
- 2021–2022: Raja CA

Senior career*
Years	Team	Apps	(Gls)
2022–	Raja CA	55	(4)
2026	→ Ararat-Armenia (loan)	3	(0)

International career^{‡}
2024–	Morocco A'	5	(0)
- * Club domestic league appearances and goals as of 28 May 2026 ‡ National team caps and goals as of 14 January 2026

Bouchaib Arrassi (Arabic: بوشعيب عراسي; born 6 January 2000) is a Moroccan professional footballer who plays as a centre-back for Armenian club Ararat-Armenia on loan from Raja CA and the Morocco national team.

== Early life ==
Bouchaib Arrassi was born on 6 January 2000 in Hay Mohammadi, Casablanca. He joined the Academy of his favourite club Raja Club Athletic which was then located in the Oasis Complex.

In 2019, he joined the Chabab Mohammédia U23 team and quickly became a starting player and the team's captain.

== Club career ==
In August 2021, he returned to play with the U23 team of Raja CA that was playing, under Bouchaib El Moubarki, in the North West Group of the Amateurs 3 League, which is the fifth level of Moroccan football. At the end of its first season, the team was close to gain promotion but finished in third place.

After some good performances, Rachid Taoussi called Arrassi in June 2022 to the first team's training. On July 2, 2022, he made his professional debut against Maghreb AS on the last leg of the Botola (0-0).

On March 18, 2023, under Mondher Kebaier, he made his Champions League debut against Vipers SC in Tanzania (1-1).

On June 23, he was lined up alongside Jamal Harkass when he scored his first professional goal against DH El Jadida during the last day of the Botola.

On 28 July 2023, Arrassi played his first match in the Arab Cup of Champions Clubs against CR Belouizdad and scored the winning goal in the last minute.

On 14 January 2026, Armenian Premier League club Ararat-Armenia announced the signing of Arrassi from Raja CA on loan for the remainder of the season.

== International career ==
On 11 November 2024, he was summoned by Tarik Sektioui with the national A' team which brings together local players under 24, for a preparation training camp at the Mohammed VI Football Complex in Salé, from November 11 to 20.

On 23 July 2025, he was announced as one of Sektioui's players called up for the 2024 African Nations Championship, which will be played from 2 to 30 August 2025.

On 3 August 2025, the Atlas Lions began the group stage with a victory against Angola (2–0). However, they were surprisingly beaten by the host country, Kenya, by a score of 1–0. In a difficult situation, they bounced back against Zambia (goals from Hrimat, Lamlioui and Bougrine) and the DR Congo (goals from Hrimat and a brace from Lamliou). This success allowed the team to qualify for the quarter-finals where they eliminated the surprise of the tournament, Tanzania, by the narrowest of margins (1–0), in Dar es Salaam. In the semi-finals, the Moroccans faced the defending champions, Senegal. After a hard-fought match that ended 1–1 with a superb goal from Sabir Bougrine, Morocco won on penalties (5–3), thus reaching the final. On August 30, at the Nyayo National Stadium, the Atlas Lions won the title by beating Madagascar 3–2, thanks to a brace from Oussama Lamlioui.

== Honours ==
=== Player ===
Raja CA

- Botola Pro: 2023–24
- Moroccan Throne Cup: 2022–23

Ararat-Armenia

- Armenian Premier League: 2025–26

Morocco

- African Nations Championship: 2024
