= Raja CA Academy =

Raja CA training centre

Raja Club Athletic Academy
- أكاديمية الرجاء الرياضي
- Interactive map of Raja Club Athletic Academy
- Location: Bouskoura, Casablanca
- Coordinates: 33.4879806°N 7.7194149°W
- Owner: Raja Club Athletic
- Type: Sports training facility
- Surface: Grass pitches (3); Synthetic turf (6)

Construction
- Built: 2016–2021
- Opened: 22 September 2022
- Cost: $10 million
- Architect: RBM Architectes
- Builder: Urbagec

Tenants
- Raja CA first team and youth teams

Raja Club Athletic Academy (Raja CA Academy or simply Raja Academy) is the training ground and academy headquarters of Moroccan football club Raja Club Athletic. The construction was eventually completed in 2021, having been delayed due to the COVID-19 pandemic. In March 2022, Raja CA Academy hosted the first team first training and it officially opened its doors on 22 September 2022.

In addition to the first team facilities, it houses the club's academy structure that offers to its young footballers, in association with the Raja-Oasis Sports Complex, accommodation, education and a high-level football development.

Raja-Oasis Sports Complex was already one of the first centers to comply with international standards in Africa, and the first Moroccan academy to adopt the "sport-study" system that combine both football and education. It was chosen by the technical direction of the Royal Moroccan Football Federation as the best club training center in 2021.

== History ==
=== Inception ===
In December 2013, Raja CA took part in the FIFA Club World Cup for the second time. They overcome Auckland City, C.F Monterrey and Atlético Mineiro to qualify for the final, a stage never reached before by an Arab or North African team.

Raja eventually lost the final to Bayern Munich, but were cheered by their supporters and the media. Three days later, the team were decorated by Mohamed VI in the Royal Palace of Casablanca. During his reception, the King of Morocco communicates to club president Mohamed Boudrika his intention to offer them a 7,5 hectares land in Bouskoura.

=== Construction ===
In 24 December, the Committee of Land Price Determination set the price of the land at 50 dirhams/m^{2} (3,75 million dirhams). The King will purchase it for the club in order to build a football academy. In the same day, the Urban Agency of Casablanca gave its approval for the construction's beginning.

In early 2016, the Raja signed a partnership with the Ministry of Equipment, Transport and Logistics so the latter would take care of the academy's construction. The project was then entrusted to the Moroccan construction company Urbagec. Mohamed Reda Bennani from RBM Architects cabinet was also selected. However, some administrative issues and the club's financial crisis delayed the construction. On 3 June 2016, the construction began. A few months later, the club organized a formal ceremony with the presence of several personalities including Khalid Safir, Wali of Grand Casablanca and Faouzi Lekjaa, president of the Royal Moroccan Football Federation. After, the club decided to edit the initial construction plans, by removing the hotel in order to increase the academy's area and number of beds.

=== Inauguration ===
In March 2021, the construction were completed but the opening was constantly delayed due to the COVID-19 pandemic. On 8 March 2022, Raja's first team completed their training in the academy for the first time.

On 22 September 2022, the academy was inaugurated in the presence of a hundred guests including Fouzi Lekjaa and the Wali of the Casablanca-Settat region, Said Ahmidouch. Aziz El Badraoui pointed out that Raja CA has one of the best sports facilities in Africa. He also announced the construction of two additional grass pitches with a cost of 18 million dirhams.

On 21 October 2022, Frenchman Patrick Cordoba is appointed as head of training and director of the academy. He had just qualify with Morocco U17 women's national team for the 2022 U-17 Women's World Cup which will take place in India.

=== National training fund ===
On 13 August 2024, FRMF, OCP Group and TAQA MAROC signed an agreement for the creation of a National Training Fund, dedicated to the professionalization of training centers and the promotion of young talents. This partnership is based on the pooling of skills and resources of the three partners to strengthen training centers across the Kingdom, by providing them with modern infrastructure, efficient management and advanced technical expertise. The fund will be used to finance the training centers, and its management will be ensured by a specialized S.A., under the supervision of the National Technical Direction of the FRMF, chaired by Fathi Jamal. The eleven signatory clubs, including Raja CA, will now only be responsible for the A teams, while the S.A. will manage training, salaries, medical monitoring, food, etc. Ultimately, the club will pay a sum to the S.A. if the player signs a contract, or a percentage if the player is sold.

The federation states that each club must register a maximum of 20 players per age group and that "young players will be licensed by their respective clubs and will play in their respective colors." In addition, they must provide sports facilities, including pitches, locker rooms, and medical and fitness facilities. The goal is to provide players aged 10 to 23 with high-level training without neglecting their schooling, whether internally or externally. Technical support is provided by a training director and eight training coaches for each age group. The team also includes fitness coaches, goalkeeper coaches, video analysts, talent scouts, a sports doctor, physiotherapists, nurses, and sports equipment managers.

L'Opinion explains that this initiative is primarily aimed at addressing the lack of commitment and investment from clubs in this area, with a few exceptions. As a result, the lack of a talent pool forces clubs to constantly recruit players. The newspaper adds that this failure is mainly due to two reasons: the lack of skills of trainers and the financial situation of clubs. The TV rights distribution system is particularly criticized, because it allocates the same annual share to all clubs and automatically penalizes the big clubs even though their needs are greater.

== Facilities ==
=== Training center ===
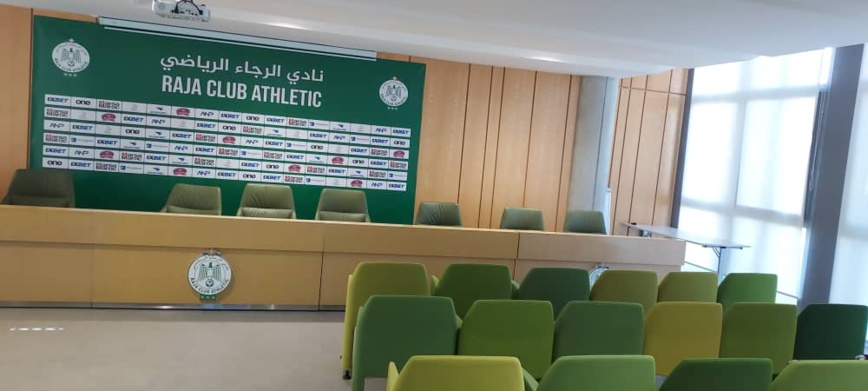
The conference room

Raja CA Academy is located in the city of Bouskoura, about twenty kilometers south of Casablanca. The facilities of the academy are subdivided into three poles: the sports pole, the educational pole and the administrative pole. These buildings are interconnected with bridges that overlook the courtyard.

The facilities were built for the first team and the youth teams competing in their respective championships (U17, U19, U21). The younger categories are trained at the Raja-Oasis Sports Complex. The academy is equipped with two natural grass pitches, a new generation synthetic turf and four mini-football pitches for younger players. The sports center has also a gym, a rehabilitation room, a medical center and a restaurant.

On 23 September 2023, the club announced the inauguration of a hotel which will accommodate the first team during their preparation camps.

=== The Academy ===
Since Abdelkader Jalal, a former Raja player between 1949 and 1954 and the club's main head of player development for almost 40 years, Raja has generally relied on its former players to coach youth teams, to conserve the club's football style.

Raja CA's youth teams are generally dominant in their national championships like in the 2014–15 season, when both U17 and U19 teams were crowned national champions. The reserve team (U21) no longer compete with their peers since their promotion to the D5 Championship (North-West group) in 2019. They finished in second position twice in a row, in 2019-20 and 2020–21 and came close to promotion to D4 under the management of Bouchaib El Moubarki.

The player development centre of Raja-Oasis Sports Complex, was one of the first in the Maghreb that matched with international standards, and the first to adopt the "sport-study" system in Morocco. In 2021, it was chosen by the technical direction of the Royal Moroccan Football Federation as the best club training center in 2021. Much of the structure of the Oasis Complex has been relocated and adapted to the academy. To apply the club's strategy, the academy has 45 rooms spread over 4 buildings. Building A is dedicated to first team players, while buildings B, C and D are for U17, U19 and U21 teams respectively. There are also ten bedrooms for the staff. In February 2023, the center was hosting 384 young footballers of all ages, including 2 Ivorians and 1 Guinean.

=== Sport and study ===
Raja-Oasis Sports Complex in Oasis
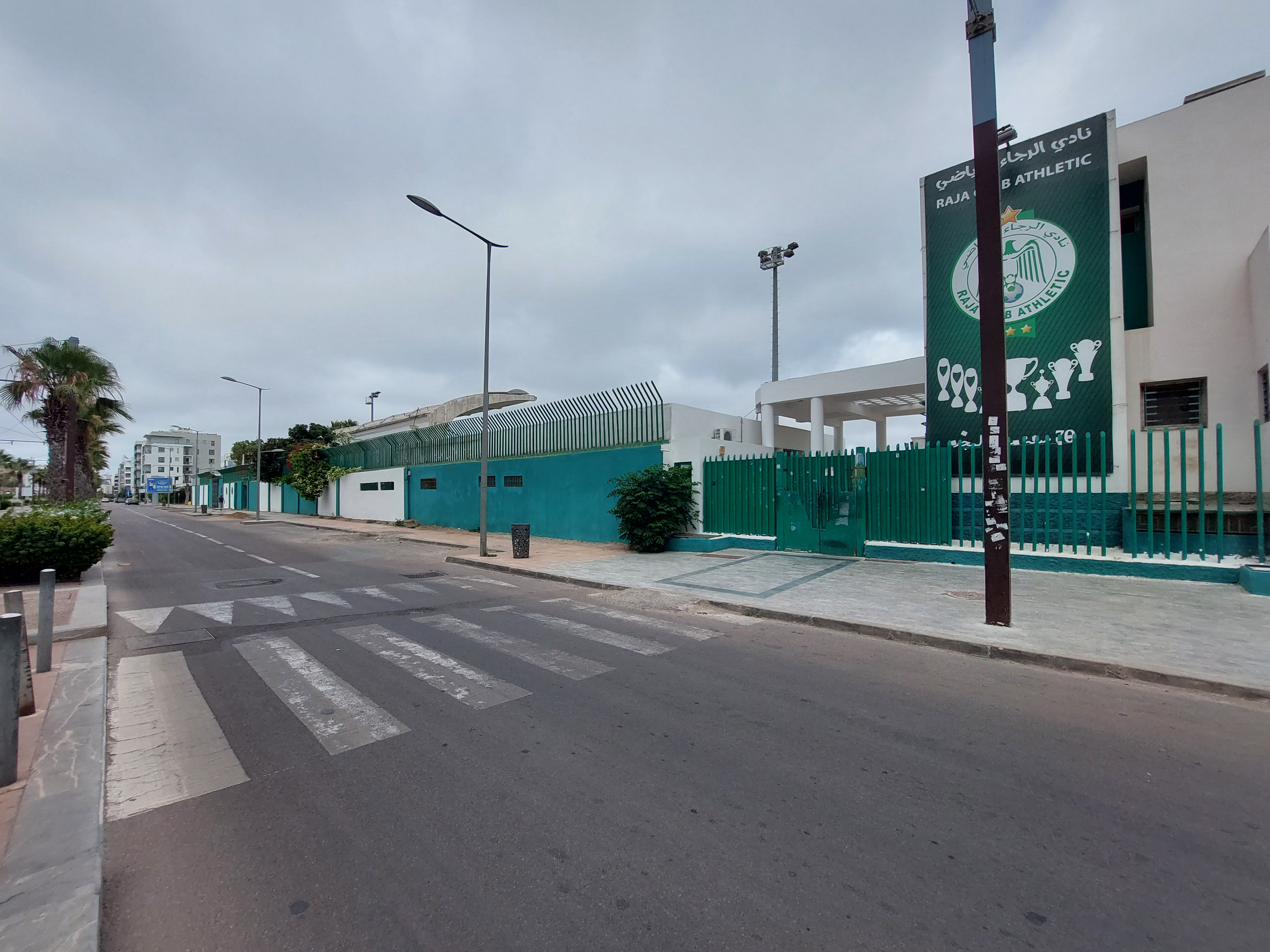

In 1999, Raja was the first Moroccan club to offer to its young players, chosen after selection, a sporting and educational program in Raja-Oasis Sports Complex. This education was provided by the Office for Skills Training and the Promotion of Work (OFPPT) thanks to a partnership with the club. The first generation formed consisted of 26 selected players, aged between 16 and 17. They had six hours of lessons and two hours of training a day. During the school holidays, they had to follow two training sessions a day.

In 2018, several agreements were signed with specialized establishments to ensure a quality school and sports project for the young athletes. Therefore, they benefit from a special status that allows them to practice football with flexible class schedule. They also benefit from permanent medical monitoring.

== Budget ==
At the beginning of construction, the expected cost (without the land cost) was estimated at 100 million dirhams.

Raja CA Academy cost breakdown
Structure	Budget (millions of dirhams)	Percentage
Royal Moroccan Football Federation	50 MDH	50%
Casablanca-Settat's regional council	20 MDH	20%
Direction générale des collectivités locales	20 MDH	20%
Raja Club Athletic	10 MDH	10%
