= Mehdi Mchakhchekh =

Moroccan footballer (born 2004)

Personal information
- Full name: Mehdi Mchakhchekh
- Date of birth: 23 February 2004 (age 22)
- Place of birth: Casablanca, Morocco
- Height: 1.83 m (6 ft 0 in)
- Position: Centre-back

Team information
- Current team: Zira FK
- Number: 33

Youth career
- –2019: Kenitra AC
- 2019–2024: Raja CA

Senior career*
Years	Team	Apps	(Gls)
2024–2026	Raja CA	32	(1)
2026–	Zira FK	0	(0)

International career^{‡}
2025–	Morocco A'	6	(0)
Medal record
Men's football
Representing Morocco
African Nations Championship
Winner	2024 Kenya-Tanzania-Uganda
- * Club domestic league appearances and goals as of 11 September 2026 ‡ National team caps and goals as of 27 August 2025

Mehdi Mchakhchekh (Arabic: مهدي المشخشخ; born 23 February 2004) is a Moroccan professional footballer who plays as centre–back for Zira FK and the Morocco national team.

== Early life ==
Mehdi Mchakhchekh began football at the Kenitra AC football academy at a young age.

In 2019, he joined Raja CA academy at the Oasis Complex and played with the U17 team. On 22 February 2022, he signed his first professional contract with the club.

On 8 July 2022, at the Boubker Amar Stadium, Raja won the U19 national championship. In 2023, he became the captain of the reserves team that took part in the fifth national division.

== Club career ==
On 3 August 2023, he made his professional debut in the final group stage match of 2023 Arab Club Champions Cup, under Josef Zinnbauer, starting against Al-Wahda (1–0 victory). He joined the preparation camp before the 2023–24 season and scored in a friendly match against RCA Zemamra.

On 13 December, he renewed his contract with the club until 2027.

On 6 January 2024, he played his second match with Raja CA, making his league debut against MC Oujda, replacing Yousri Bouzok in the last minute of regulation time (2–0 victory). At the end of the season, he won the championship, beating AS FAR.

On 30 January 2025, he made his starting debut against Olympique Safi at the Labi Zaouli Stadium (1–1 draw).

== International career ==
On 11 November 2024, he was called-up by Tarik Sektioui with the national A' team which brings together local players under 24, for a preparation training camp at the Mohammed VI Football Complex in Salé, from November 11 to 20.

On 1 June 2025, he was called-up by Tarik Sektioui with the national A' team (for players born in 2000 and over) which will carry out a preparation training camp at the Mohammed VI football complex from June 2 to 10. He was re-selected in July for the last gathering before the 2024 African Nations Championship scheduled for August 2025.

On 3 August 2025, the Atlas Lions began the group stage with a victory against Angola (2–0). However, they were surprisingly beaten by the host country, Kenya, by a score of 1–0. In a difficult situation, they bounced back against Zambia (goals from Hrimat, Lamlioui and Bougrine) and the DR Congo (goals from Hrimat and a brace from Lamliou). This success allowed the team to qualify for the quarter-finals where they eliminated the surprise of the tournament, Tanzania, by the narrowest of margins (1–0), in Dar es Salaam. In the semi-finals, the Moroccans faced the defending champions, Senegal. After a hard-fought match that ended 1–1 with a superb goal from Sabir Bougrine, Morocco won on penalties (5–3), thus reaching the final. On August 30, at the Nyayo National Stadium, the Atlas Lions won the title by beating Madagascar 3–2, thanks to a brace from Oussama Lamlioui.

== Honours ==
Morocco

- African Nations Championship: 2024

Raja CA

- Botola Pro: 2023–24
