= Mohammad Abu Zrayq =

Jordanian footballer

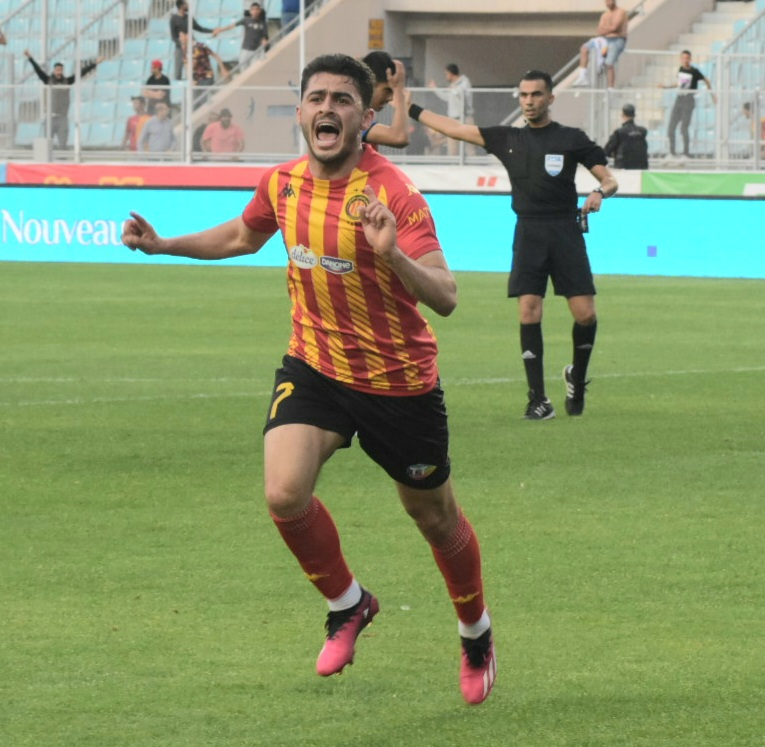
- Abu Zrayq in 2023

Personal information
- Full name: Mohammad Faisal Yousef Abu Zrayq
- Date of birth: 30 December 1997 (age 28)
- Place of birth: Ar-Ramtha, Jordan
- Height: 1.68 m (5 ft 6 in)
- Position: Winger

Team information
- Current team: Raja CA
- Number: 27

Youth career
- Al-Ramtha

Senior career*
Years	Team	Apps	(Gls)
2018–2022	Al-Ramtha	51	(16)
2019–2020	→ Al-Sailiya (loan)	11	(2)
2022	Al Ahli Tripoli	14	(4)
2022–2023	Espérance de Tunis	7	(2)
2023–2024	Al Ahli Tripoli	2	(0)
2024	Al Wehdat		
2024–2025	Al-Shorta	6	(1)
2025	Al-Hussein	9	(3)
2025–2026	Al-Ramtha	10	(4)
2026–	Raja CA	13	(2)

International career^{‡}
2019–	Jordan	40	(5)
Medal record
Representing Jordan
Men's football
FIFA Arab Cup
Runner-up	2025 Qatar	Team
- * Club domestic league appearances and goals as of 13 September 2026 ‡ National team caps and goals as of 15 December 2025

Mohammad Faisal Yousef Abu Zrayq (Arabic: محمد فيصل يوسف أبو زريق, born 30 December 1997), popularly known as Sharara (Arabic: شرارة), is a Jordanian professional footballer who plays as a winger for Botola Pro club Raja CA and the Jordan national team.

== Club career ==
He started his career for Al-Ramtha and was loaned to Al-Sailiya in the summer of 2019. On 9 January 2022, he joined Libyan club Al Ahli on a free transfer. On 15 August 2022, he joined Tunisian club Espérance de Tunis, in a three-year deal. On 3 December 2023, he made his return to Al Ahli for 3 months before joining hometown club Al Wehdat. On 30 July 2024, Sharara joined Iraq Stars League side Al-Shorta. On 30 January 2025, he joined Al-Hussein.

=== Return to Al-Ramtha ===
On 20 July 2025, Al-Ramtha announced the signing of Sharara on a one-year, free transfer from Al-Hussein.

=== Raja CA ===
On 5 January 2026, Sharara joined Botola Pro club Raja CA, after terminating his contract with Al-Ramtha.

== International career ==
Sharara played his first international match with the Jordan national team against Slovakia in a friendly match on 7 June 2019. He was named in Jordan's squad for the 2021 FIFA Arab Cup.

== Statistics ==
=== Club ===
As of match played 5 July 2026

Appearances and goals by club, season and competition
Club	Season	League			Cup (Note: Includes Moroccan Throne Cup.)		Continental		Total	
Club	Season	Division	Apps	Goals	Apps	Goals	Apps	Goals	Apps	Goals
Raja CA	2025–26	Botola Pro	13	2	1	0	—		14	2
Raja CA	Total		13	2	1	0	0	0	0	0
Career total			13	2	1	0	0	0	14	2

=== International ===
#	Date	Venue	Opponent	Score	Result	Competition
1.	1 February 2021	Theyab Awana Stadium, Dubai, United Arab Emirates	Tajikistan	1–0	2–0	Friendly
2.	28 May 2022	Suheim bin Hamad Stadium, Doha, Qatar	India	1–0	2–0	Friendly
3.	26 March 2024	Amman International Stadium, Amman, Jordan	Pakistan	7–0	7–0	2026 FIFA World Cup qualification
4.	9 September 2025	Amman International Stadium, Amman, Jordan	Dominican Republic	3–0	3–0	Friendly
5.	9 December 2025	Al Bayt Stadium, Al Khor, Qatar	Egypt	2–0	3–0	2025 FIFA Arab Cup
