= Marsa Maroc =

Moroccan ports operator

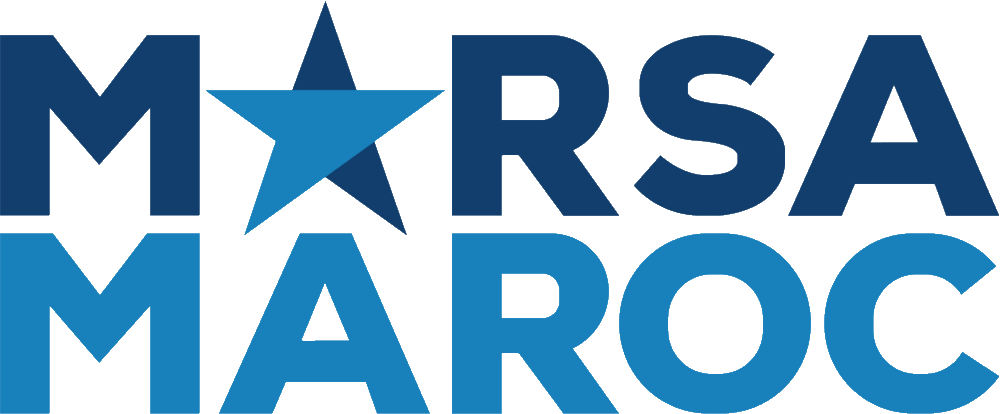
- Marsa Maroc logo
- Type: Public
- Traded as: CSE: MSA
- Industry: Port Management
- Founded: December 2006
- Headquarters: Casablanca, Morocco
- Number of locations: 34
- Key people: Mohammed ABDELJALIL (chairman executive board); Abdelaziz BOUAMRANI, Minister of Equipment and Transport (chairman supervisory board)
- Revenue: ▲DH 4.32 billion
- Number of employees: 2311 (2023)
- Website: marsamaroc.co.ma

Marsa Maroc is the main operator of ports in Morocco. Its legal status is a Société Anonyme (Plc.) with an Executive board chaired by Mohammed Abdeljalil and a supervisory board chaired by the Minister of Equipment and Transport. The official company name is Société d'Exploitation des Ports while Marsa Maroc is its trading name.

== History ==
The company was formed in December 2006 as part of the implementation of Law 15-02, which aimed to reform the Moroccan port sector. Prior to this restructuring, the Office d’Exploitation des Ports (ODEP), a state-owned company, was responsible for managing Morocco's ports. The reform created two separate entities: the Agence Nationale des Ports (ANP), which became the industry regulator, and the Société d'Exploitation des Ports, later branded as Marsa Maroc, which took over commercial port operations.

In 2007, the company officially adopted the trade name Marsa Maroc. Over 2007 and 2008, Marsa Maroc developed a set of strategic and business plans referred to as CAP15. These plans aimed at positioning the company for long-term growth by focusing on the development of container terminals in Moroccan ports and forming strategic partnerships in the bulk and oil sectors.

In June 2009, a significant milestone in the execution of the CAP15 strategy was reached when Marsa Maroc signed a 30-year concession agreement with the Tanger Med Special Agency (TMSA) concerning Container Terminal 4 (CT4) at the Tanger Med port. Under the agreement, Marsa Maroc committed to developing all superstructures and equipment required to operate the terminal. CT4 is designed as a multi-user facility with a 2,250,000 TEU capacity, 1,200 meters of quay, and a water depth of 16 meters.

Another milestone followed in the Port of Casablanca in 2009. On 29 March 2010, King Mohammed VI presided over the groundbreaking of a terminal dedicated to processing and storing vehicles. This project, with an investment of 168 million dirhams, included a 75,000 m^{2} covered facility capable of handling 5,000 units.

On 22 December 2011, King Mohammed VI inaugurated the new deep-water commercial port at Jorf Lasfar, located on the Atlantic coast south of El Jadida.

== Key figures ==
The company manages nine ports that are situated in Morocco. It has a registered share capital of 733.956.000 MAD, a turnover of 1952 million MAD and a global traffic of 35.5 million tons. By the end of 2011 it had 2,247 staff.

== The managed ports ==
Marsa Maroc operates 9 ports in Morocco.

The ports are:

=== Dakhla ===
The port of Dakhla is a relative small port with main products being liquid bulk and fish. It employs 22 people and the traffic volume was 311,000 tons.
It offer 300 meter of quays with 8 meter depth, 2 mobile cranes and facilities for the fishing fleet. The manager of the port of Dakhla doesn't report directly to the chairman of the Executive board, but reports to the manager of the Port of Laâyoune:

=== Laâyoune ===
Laâyoune or El Aaiún port is operated by Marsa Maroc. The port offers 3 terminals: Quay 1,2 and 4.

- Quay 1: is 150 meter long with a managed depth of 6,15 meter and has 9900 m^{2} land area. Quay 1 is used for hydro-carbons and sand.
- Quay 2: is 145 meter long and is 6.15 meter deep. The land-area is 5600 m^{2} and offers facilities for containers and hydrocarbons.
- Quay 4: is 276 meter long and 6.15 meter deep. Its main goal is processing of minerals and fishing

=== Agadir ===
The port of Agadir has 4 terminals/quays. Its total turnover is 3 million tons and over 127,000 containers. It offers employment to 230 staff. The four quays/terminals are:

- Container Quay: 280 meter long, 10½ meter deep. It has 3 container cranes with 100t capacity and one with 120 t.
- Eastern Quay: 510 meter long, 10½ meter deep and one Ro-Ro terminal (160 meter long). The main goods for this terminal are citrus-fruits, vegetables, coal and wood.
- Mineral terminal: This terminal offers facilities for the export of minerals. It has a single quay of 160 meter long and 15 meter deep.
- Cruise Terminal: This quay also offer 160 meter berthing space with 15 meter depth. Besides two bridges for (dis)embarking it offers all facilities needed to handle cruise/passenger ships.

=== Safi ===
The port of Safi has an annual turnover of 2.6 million tons, 148 members of staff and has 3 terminals. The main products handled in this port are: sulfur, barytes, zinc and carbon

- Commercial Quay: 448 meter long with a depth from 8½–9½ m. Land storage: 14.400 m^{2} and 6700 m^{2} covered area. Equipment for this quay are: two cranes on rails (40 t), 7 fixed cranes and one mobile crane (6 t. each) and two grasshoppers with a capacity of 250 resp. 550 ton/hour. The main products in this terminal is dry bulk including zinc, pet coke, clinker, barite.
- Rive: 386 meter quay with a depth between 10½ and 12 meter. Land-storage area of 21.000 m^{2}. It offers two gantry cranes of 28 and 19 t. The major product of the Rive terminal is sulfur.
- Northern Quay: 184 meter quay length with a depth between 9½ and 11 meter. Land-storage area of 4820 m^{2}. There is one 19t gantry crane and the main product is caustic soda

=== Jorf Lasfar ===
The Jorf Lasfar port is close to the city of El Jadida. The port was originally built to export phosphates and other minerals. Today it mainly handles solid and liquid bulk goods where the most important products include oil, scrap-metals and fertilizers. It has 139 staff. The port has 3 terminals:

- Commercial Pier: 250 meter long, water-depths between 5¼-12½ meter. It has 3 berths, one of them with a ro-ro bridge of 100 t. It has 3 cranes on rails (38 - 40 t capacity) and 2 mobile cranes of 40t. Other equipment includes: forklifts, tractors, mobile hoppers and a range of shovels.
- Oil Terminal: 60 meter dock with 15,6 meter depth. Loading equipment includes: LPG arm with a capacity of 880 m^{3}/h, diesel and kerosine arms with a capacity of 1300 m^{3}/h each. The terminal handles butane and propane LPG and liquid hydrocarbons (diesel, kerosine, gasoline)
- Polyvalent terminal: 314 meter dock with 12½ meter depth. Two mobile cranes of 63 t. each and two mobile hoppers of 120m^{3}. This is a general cargo terminal.

Cap Blanc du Nord, the lighthouse at the entrance of the port, is known to be not reliable, with its light occasionally going out.

=== Casablanca ===
The Port of Casablanca is one of the largest artificial ports in the world. The port has 4 terminals with a total turnover of 9,6 million tons of cargo, 600.000 TEU. It offers employment to 1200 people and the main products handled by the port are: ores, steel products, sugar, wood and derivatives. The goods are transported as containers, dry-bulk or Ro-Ro.
The four terminals are

- Eastern Container Terminal: 600 meter long, 12 meter deep, 4 berths. Land storage area: 60 hectare. The terminal has 8 gantry cranes, two of them are 'post-Panamax'. The terminal has a capacity of processing 650.000 tue.
- Ro-Ro terminal: the ro-ro terminal offers two 100t cranes and is 8 meter deep. There is a storage capacity of 5000 units and there are 13 Ro-Ro tractors of 60 ton.
- Multi-purpose terminal: the terminal offers 1500 meter quay with water-depths between 9 and 10½ meter in 12 berths. It has a covered storage area of 14.000 m^{2} and 60.000m^{2} land area. Cargo handling is done using 4 cranes of 38 t, 32 quay cranes with a capacity between 6 t and 25 t and 5 mobile cranes. Other general equipment includes: 106 forklifts, 20 tractors between 40 and 60 tons, hydroelectric grapples, hoppers 7 weight bridges. The main cargos handled in this terminal includes: steel, sugar, wood, animal-feed and oil-seeds.
- Ore Terminal: 390 meter quay with water-depths between 9.15 and 10,5 meter. Land area is 2,5 hectare. There are two ore-gantry cranes of 14t and 16t. Another 6 rail cranes of 6 t capacity complete the cargo-handling equipment for the ore terminal. Besides ore the terminal also handles scrap metals.

=== Mohammedia ===
The port of Mohammedia has a turnover of 12 million tons and offers employment to 130 people. The port specializes in liquid bulk goods or petro-chemicals. The port is divided in two main terminals:

- Petrochemical terminal: The terminal has two posts A and B. The dock is 580 meter long with a depth up to 17 meter. It has a loading platform that is 23 meter long and 73 meter wide. It has an extensive network of pipes to load and unload liquid petrochemicals with 12 (un)loading systems with flexible pipes. To support docking it has two tugboats of 6000 hp each.
- Internal terminal: The 'internal' terminal has 3 quays with 340 quay length and a depth between 6 and 6,70 meter. It has a covered storage area of 13.000m^{2}. It has extensive (un)loading equipment and pipe-network to handle a range of liquid petrochemicals.

=== Tanger Med ===
Tanger-Med is a port in the Mediterranean, some 40 km East of the city of Tanger. The port started operation in 2007 and by volume it is to become the largest port in the Mediterranean as well as the largest port of Africa. Since the opening in 2007 - with an initial capacity of 3,5 million containers and reaching its maximum capacity of 8,5 million by 2015 the port has grown over the years, with a serious setback in 2011 when it was hit by several strikes. Besides the container terminal other important usage are the ferry connections to Spain and the export of cars via a large plant of Renault: between January and August 2013 some 86000 Renault vehicles as well as 15000 cars of other makes were exported via Tanger Med

Marsa Maroc operates the 'general cargo' terminal in Tanger Med. Other terminals are operated by 3rd parties under long-term contracts with Marsa. The terminal operated by Marsa employs 74 people and has a turnover of 300.000 ton. The terminal offers 568 meter quays with a water-depth between 12 and 15 meter. A storage hangar of 5000 m^{2} is available on 9,3 ha terrain. Two mobile cranes with capacities of 45 and 63 tons and 17 forklifts are available to handle cereals and general heavy goods.

=== Nador Port ===
The easternmost port managed by Marsa Maroc is Nador Port. This port, which shares the piers and lagoon of the (larger) port of the Spanish enclave Melilla. The port is actually located in Beni Ansar, 10 km. East of Nador city. The port has three terminals:

- Terminal 2: 700 meter quay with 13 meter depth and 300 meter with 10 meter depth. 14,7 ha storage area. There are four cranes on rails with capacity between 38 and 43 tons and three cranes of 10 t. Main cargo is dry bulk, coal and minerals.
- Passenger Terminal: 680 meter quay in 4 berthing docks with ro-ro bridge at the bow and overhead pedestrian bridges allowing safe embarking/disembarking of pedestrians without crossing any cars (dis)embarking at the same time. The bridges connect to a large (3500m^{2}) reception hall with waiting area and customs clearance handling. And the car waiting area offers 8000m^{2}shaded area for cars waiting to board the ships. (Most departures are in the late afternoon, while arrivals are mainly very early in the morning). The ferry terminal offers regular services to Almeria (Spain) and Sète in France.
- Hydrocarbon Quay: 100 meter quay with a water-depth of 13 meters. Products processed by this terminal are gasonline and butane.

From the offices of the Port of Nador Marsa Maroc also manages Gare Maritime de Al Hoceima which (only) consists of a lobby of 1,500 m2 and 2,700 m2 of shaded surfaces. No maritime equipment is managed by Marsa Maroc in Al Hoceima.

== Organisation ==
Marsa Maroc has two governing bodies: the Supervisory Board and the Executive board. The latter is responsible for the daily operations. The chairman of the Executive board is Mr. Mohammed Abdeljualil. The company has two 'organisation models': one 'general' one where responsibilities and reporting is based on function and a 2nd organisation model is based on the ports under Marsa management. The 'core management' consists of the chairman and four managers:

- mr. Mahjoub Bayri - responsible for the Tanger Med development
- mr. Yousef Benvani - development manager
- mr. Mustafa Sahabi - finance manager
- mr. Rachid Hadi - operational manager for the Port of Casablanca

Another 6 manager for issues like human-resources, IT, legal, technical etc. also report to the Chair of the Executive board.

Besides this organisational chart based on function there are also managers for each port under Marsa operation who report directly to mr. Mohammed Abdeljualil (except for the port of Dakhla, as that is seen as a division of the port of Laâyoune)

== Services ==
Besides managing the port itself and making the loading equipment available Marsa Maroc also offer additional services to ships using its ports. These services include:

- Pilotage in all ports except Casablanca and Jorf-Lasfar where this is offered by another provider
- Towing
- Mooring assistance
- re-fueling

On top of these 'vessel related services' Marsa Maroc can also offer additional services in relation to the handling of the goods. In cooperation with Marsa Maroc customers can agree on additional services when handling their cargo

== Annual Reports ==
As a Plc the company publishes its annual reports in Arabic, French and English and in co-operation with the ANP (Agence National de Ports) it also publishes detailed information on the turnover. These figures are detailed on both type of product and on the port/location. These last reports are not available in English but are published in France. The most recent report is the ANP report over 2012
