= Khalid Kbiri Alaoui =

Moroccan footballer (born 1996)

Personal information
- Date of birth: 28 June 1996 (age 30)
- Place of birth: Fez, Morocco
- Height: 1.92 m (6 ft 4 in)
- Position: Goalkeeper

Team information
- Current team: Raja CA
- Number: 1

Youth career
- 2010–2016: Maghreb de Fès

Senior career*
Years	Team	Apps	(Gls)
2016–2019	Maghreb de Fès	1	(0)
2019–2020	Raja Beni Mellal	11	(0)
2020–2021	Maghreb de Fès	8	(0)
2021–2022	JS Soualem	9	(0)
2022–2025	Olympique Safi	82	(0)
2025–	Raja CA	8	(0)

International career^{‡}
2013	Morocco U17		
- * Club domestic league appearances and goals as of 13 September 2026 ‡ National team caps and goals as of 22 July 2025

Khalid Kbiri Alaoui (Arabic: خالد كبيري العلوي; born 28 June 1996) is a Moroccan professional footballer who plays as a goalkeeper for Botola club Raja CA. He began his career with Maghreb de Fès and has since played for several Moroccan clubs, including Raja Beni Mellal, JS Soualem, and Olympique Safi, where he helped them win their first-ever major trophy, the 2024–25 Throne Cup. In 2025, he joined Raja CA.

== Early life ==
Born on 28 June 1996 in Fez, he joined the Maghreb de Fès academy in 2010, demonstrating strong potential as a goalkeeper

== Club career ==
=== Maghreb de Fès ===
He was promoted to the first team in 2016 under coach Tarik Sektioui, as the club had just been relegated to Botola 2. On 18 November 2016, as third-choice keeper, he was part of the squad that won the 2016 Throne Cup.

On 9 April 2017, he made his continental debut in the 2017 CAF Confederation Cup second round against Fath US.

=== Beni Mellal and Soualem ===
In July 2019, he moved to Raja Beni Mellal, a club that assured its relegation to Botola 2 during long before the season ended.

On 30 November 2020, he returned to Maghreb de Fès. On 4 December 2020, he made his Botola debut in a 2–1 win over AS FAR under coach Abdellatif Jrindou. He competed for the starting spot with Mohammed Amine El Bourkadi and Aymane Majid, finishing the season with eight league appearances.

In August 2021, he mutually terminated his contract and joined JS Soualem. He quickly established himself under coach Redouane El Haimer but was later sidelined due to contract renewal disagreements.

=== Olympique Safi ===
On 13 July 2022, Khalid signed a two-year deal with Olympique Club de Safi. In his first season, he appeared in 17 matches, and during the 2023–24 season, he played 29 out of 30 league games, conceding only 20 goals. He was honored as the third-best goalkeeper of the season by the UMFP, behind Anas Zniti and Mehdi Benabid. In June 2024, he renewed his contract for two additional years and became team captain. In the 2024–25 season, he made 29 league appearances, conceded 27 goals, and kept 10 clean sheets.

On 29 June 2025, OC Safi defeated RS Berkane on penalties to win the 2024–25 Throne Cup, their first-ever title. Alaoui played a decisive role in this success, making three crucial saves, including two in the penalty shootout. He received the trophy from Prince Moulay Rachid.

=== Raja CA ===
On 17 July 2025, Khalid moved to Raja CA on a three-year deal, after the club has triggered his release clause.

== International career ==
In 2013, he was called up to the Moroccan under-17 national team. On 2 September 2018, he was called up by Jamal Sellami to join the local A' selection for a preparation training camp in El Jadida from 3 to 9 September.

== Honours ==
Maghreb Fès

- Throne Cup: 2016

OC Safi

- Throne Cup: 2024–25
