= Ayoub Maamouri =

Moroccan footballer (born 2000)

Personal information
- Date of birth: 1 December 2000 (age 25)
- Place of birth: Drargua, Morocco
- Height: 1.70 m (5 ft 7 in)
- Position: Forward

Team information
- Current team: Raja CA
- Number: 24

Youth career
- 2016–2017: ASC Tikiouine
- 2017–2019: ASF Agadir Futsal
- 2019–2020: Olympique Dcheira

Senior career*
Years	Team	Apps	(Gls)
2020–2024	Olympique Dcheira		
2024–	Raja CA	32	(5)

International career^{‡}
2025–	Morocco A'	4	(0)
- * Club domestic league appearances and goals as of 15 November 2025 ‡ National team caps and goals as of 30 March 2025

Ayoub Maamouri (Arabic: أيوب معموري; born 1 December 2000) is a Moroccan professional footballer who plays as a forward for Botola side Raja CA.

== Early life ==
Ayoub Maamouri was born on 1 December 2000 in the little town of Drargua in western Morocco, situated in the suburban area of Agadir. In 2016, he joined the football school of AS Chabab Tikiouine.

In 2017, he joined AS Faucon Agadir, the city's best futsal club, where he played for two years and won several trophies. He was called up several times to the U17 and U19 national futsal teams.

== Club career ==
=== Olympique Dcheira ===
In 2019, he returned to football and got into the Olympique Dcheira reserves before reaching the first team the following year under manager Abdelkarim Jinani, making his professional debut in Botola Pro2. The team had its best season ever and narrowly missed promotion, finishing third, two points behind Maghreb AS.

In 2020–21, the team finished fourth then third the following season. Maamouri finished as his team's top scorer at the end of the 2023–24 season.

=== Raja CA ===
On 27 August 2024, he signed a three–year contract with Raja CA for a transfer fee of €80,000. On 29 September, Maamouri made his debut for the Greens against Olympique Safi, coming on as a substitute in the 88th minute (2–3 victory).

On 22 December, in his first start against Chabab Mohammedia, he scored his first goal after providing his first assist (3–0 victory).

== International career ==
On 15 March 2025 he was called up by Tarik Sektioui with the national A' team which gather local players under 24. They completed a preparation camp at the Mohammed VI Complex before playing twice against Guinea (2–0 victory; 0–0 draw).
