= Mathias Oyewusi =

Nigerian footballer (born 1999)

Personal information
- Full name: Mathias Kehinde Oyewusi
- Date of birth: 2 February 1999 (age 27)
- Place of birth: Jos, Nigeria
- Height: 1.84 m (6 ft 0 in)
- Position: Forward

Team information
- Current team: Raja CA
- Number: 99

Senior career*
Years	Team	Apps	(Gls)
2018	Ankaran	4	(3)
2019–2020	Bilje	28	(16)
2020–2021	Gorica	28	(3)
2022–2023	Žalgiris	53	(28)
2024–2025	Valenciennes	40	(8)
2025–2026	Kolos Kovalivka	12	(1)
2026–	Raja CA	20	(4)
- * Club domestic league appearances and goals as of 29 July 2026

Mathias Kehinde Oyewusi (born 2 February 1999) is a Nigerian professional footballer who plays as a forward for Botola Pro club Raja CA.

== Early life ==
Oyewusi joined a Nigerian youth academy at the age of seventeen.

== Career ==
In 2023, Oyweusi signed for French side Valenciennes.

== Style of play ==
Oyewusi mainly operates as a forward and has been described as "endowed with a very good capacity for acceleration."

== Personal life ==
Oyewusi is the son of a Nigerian footballer. His twin brother is also a footballer
