= Oasis (Casablanca) =

Quartier of Casablanca, Morocco

Coordinates: 33°33′N 7°38′W

Oasis is a quartier of Casablanca, Morocco.
