= Abdellah Khafifi =

Moroccan footballer (born 1993)

Personal information
- Date of birth: February 19, 1993 (age 33)
- Place of birth: Oujda, Morocco
- Height: 1.83 m (6 ft 0 in)
- Position: Centre-back

Team information
- Current team: Maghreb Fes
- Number: 5

Senior career*
Years	Team	Apps	(Gls)
2015–2022	Mouloudia Oujda	120	(6)
2022–2023	Umm Salal	27	(3)
2023–2026	Raja CA	94	(8)
2026–	Maghreb Fes	0	(0)

International career^{‡}
2020	Morocco A'	1	(0)
- * Club domestic league appearances and goals as of 13 September 2026 ‡ National team caps and goals as of 8 June 2024

Abdellah Khafifi (Arabic: عبد الله خفيفي; born 19 February 1993) is a Moroccan professional footballer who plays as a centre-back for Botola club Maghreb Fes and the Morocco national team.

Khafifi has spent seven years with Mouloudia Oujda, having signed with their senior team in 2017.

== Honours ==
Raja CA

- Botola Pro: 2023–24
- Moroccan Throne Cup: 2022–23
