= Aymen Barkok =

Moroccan footballer

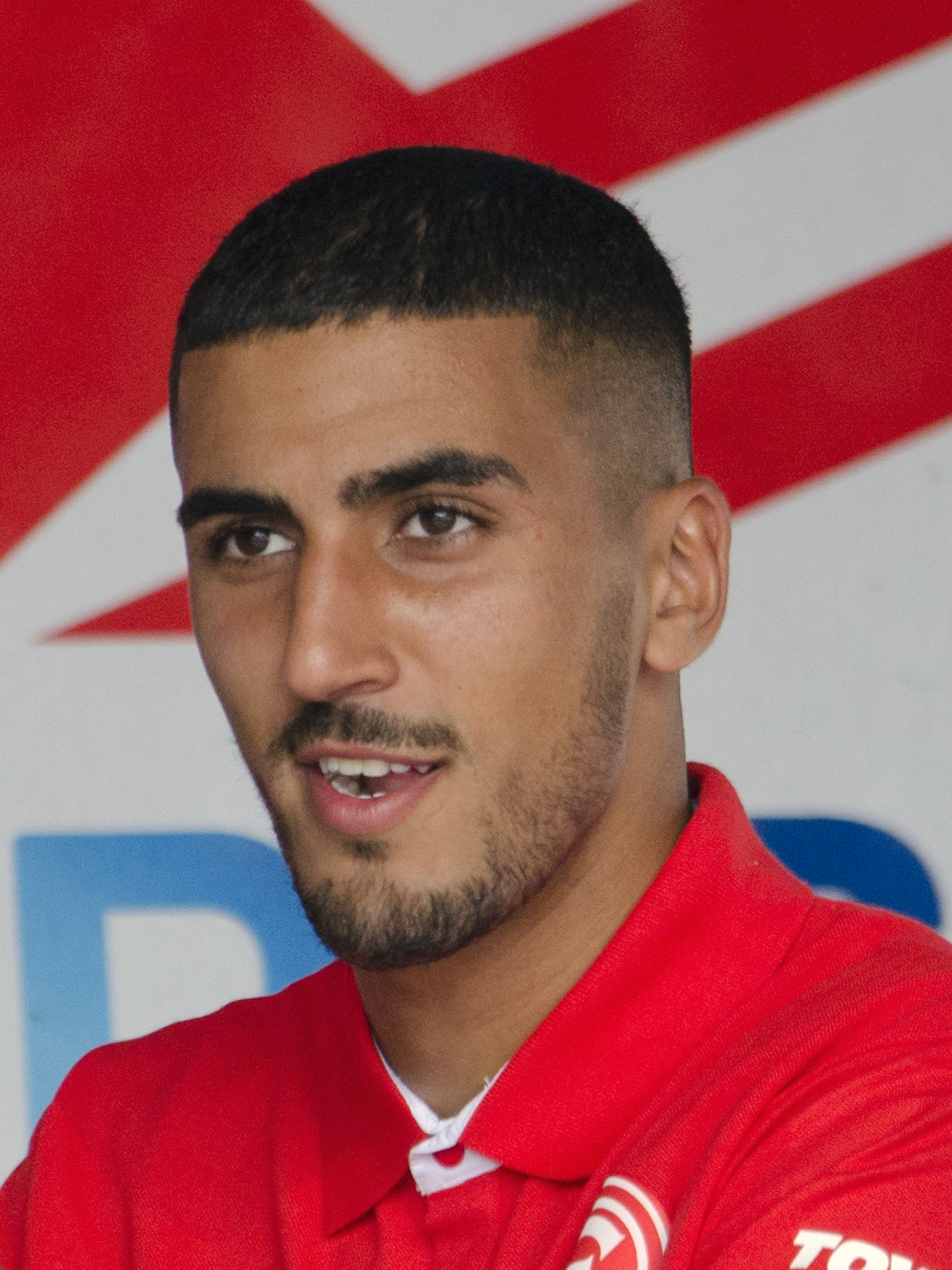
- Barkok in August 2019

Personal information
- Date of birth: 21 May 1998 (age 28)
- Place of birth: Frankfurt, Germany
- Height: 1.88 m (6 ft 2 in)
- Position: Midfielder

Team information
- Current team: Raja CA
- Number: 6

Youth career
- 2003–2009: SG Praunheim
- 2009–2011: Rot-Weiss Frankfurt
- 2011–2013: Kickers Offenbach
- 2013–2016: Eintracht Frankfurt

Senior career*
Years	Team	Apps	(Gls)
2016–2022	Eintracht Frankfurt	58	(4)
2018–2020	→ Fortuna Düsseldorf (loan)	15	(0)
2018–2020	→ Fortuna Düsseldorf II (loan)	9	(5)
2022–2025	Mainz 05	40	(1)
2022	Mainz 05 II	1	(0)
2024	→ Hertha BSC (loan)	12	(1)
2025	Schalke 04	6	(0)
2026–	Raja CA	19	(1)

International career^{‡}
2014	Germany U16	1	(0)
2014	Germany U17	2	(0)
2017	Germany U19	6	(2)
2017–2018	Germany U20	6	(0)
2017	Germany U21	1	(0)
2020–	Morocco	18	(1)
- * Club domestic league appearances and goals as of 13 September 2026 ‡ National team caps and goals as of 10 December 2022

Aymen Barkok (Arabic: أيمن برقوق; born 21 May 1998) is a professional footballer who plays as a central or attacking midfielder for Botola Pro club Raja CA. Born in Germany, he plays for the Morocco national team.

== Club career ==
On 20 October 2016, Barkok, previously playing with the under-19s, signed his first professional contract with Frankfurt, lasting until 2020.

Barkok made his professional debut for Eintracht Frankfurt in the Bundesliga on 20 November 2016 in an away match against Werder Bremen, coming on for Mijat Gaćinović in the 75th minute. Barkok went on to score the winning goal for Frankfurt in the final minute of the game, with the match finishing as a 2–1 victory.

On 19 May 2018, Barkok joined Bundesliga newcomers Fortuna Düsseldorf on loan for the 2018–19 season.

On 31 January 2022, Mainz 05 announced that Barkok signed a three-year contract with the club, beginning on 1 July 2022. On 18 January 2024, Barkok moved on loan to Hertha BSC until the end of the season.

On 3 February 2025, Barkok signed a contract with 2. Bundesliga club Schalke 04 until the end of the season.

On 7 January 2026, Aymen Barkouk signed a two-and-a-half-year contract with Raja CA, a move he considers a major step in his professional career. He stated his determination to give his all to defend the club's colors and meet the expectations of its supporters. He will be playing outside of Germany for the first time in his career.

== International career ==
Barkok was born in Germany. He is a former youth international for Germany. He switched allegiances to represent Morocco national team. He debuted for them in a friendly 3–1 win over Senegal on 9 October 2020.

Barkok participated in the 2017 UEFA European Under-19 Championship, 2017–18 Under 20 Elite League and 2021 Africa Cup of Nations.

== Career statistics ==
=== Club ===
As of 28 May 2025

Club	Season	League			Cup		Europe		Total	
Club	Season	Division	Apps	Goals	Apps	Goals	Apps	Goals	Apps	Goals
Eintracht Frankfurt	2016–17	Bundesliga	18	2	1	0	—		19	2
Eintracht Frankfurt	2017–18	Bundesliga	9	0	1	0	—		10	0
Eintracht Frankfurt	2020–21	Bundesliga	26	2	2	0	—		28	2
Eintracht Frankfurt	2021–22	Bundesliga	5	0	1	0	1 (Note: Appearance(s) in UEFA Europa League)	0	7	0
Eintracht Frankfurt	Total		58	4	5	0	1	0	64	4
Fortuna Düsseldorf (loan)	2018–19	Bundesliga	12	0	1	0	—		13	0
Fortuna Düsseldorf (loan)	2019–20	Bundesliga	3	0	2	0	—		5	0
Fortuna Düsseldorf (loan)	Total		15	0	3	0	—		18	0
Fortuna Düsseldorf II (loan)	2018–19	Regionalliga	3	1	—		—		3	1
Fortuna Düsseldorf II (loan)	2019–20	Regionalliga	6	4	—		—		6	4
Fortuna Düsseldorf II (loan)	Total		9	5	—		—		9	5
Mainz 05	2022–23	Bundesliga	23	0	3	1	—		26	1
Mainz 05	2023–24	Bundesliga	13	1	1	0	—		14	1
Mainz 05	2024–25	Bundesliga	4	0	0	0	—		4	0
Mainz 05	Total		40	1	4	1	—		44	2
Mainz 05 II	2022–23	Regionalliga	1	0	—		—		1	0
Hertha BSC (loan)	2023–24	2. Bundesliga	12	1	1	0	—		13	1
Schalke 04	2024–25	2. Bundesliga	6	0	—		—		6	0
Career total			141	11	13	1	1	0	155	12

=== International ===
Appearances and goals by national team and year
National team	Year	Apps	Goals
Morocco
Morocco	2020	4	0
Morocco	2021	10	1
Morocco	2022	4	0
Total		18	1

== Honours ==
Eintracht Frankfurt

- DFB-Pokal: 2017–18
- UEFA Europa League: 2021–22

Germany U20

- Under 20 Elite League: 2017–18

Individual

- Fritz Walter Medal U19 Silver: 2017
