= Bouskoura =

Bouskoura بو سكورة ⴱⵓⵙⴽⵓⵔⴰ
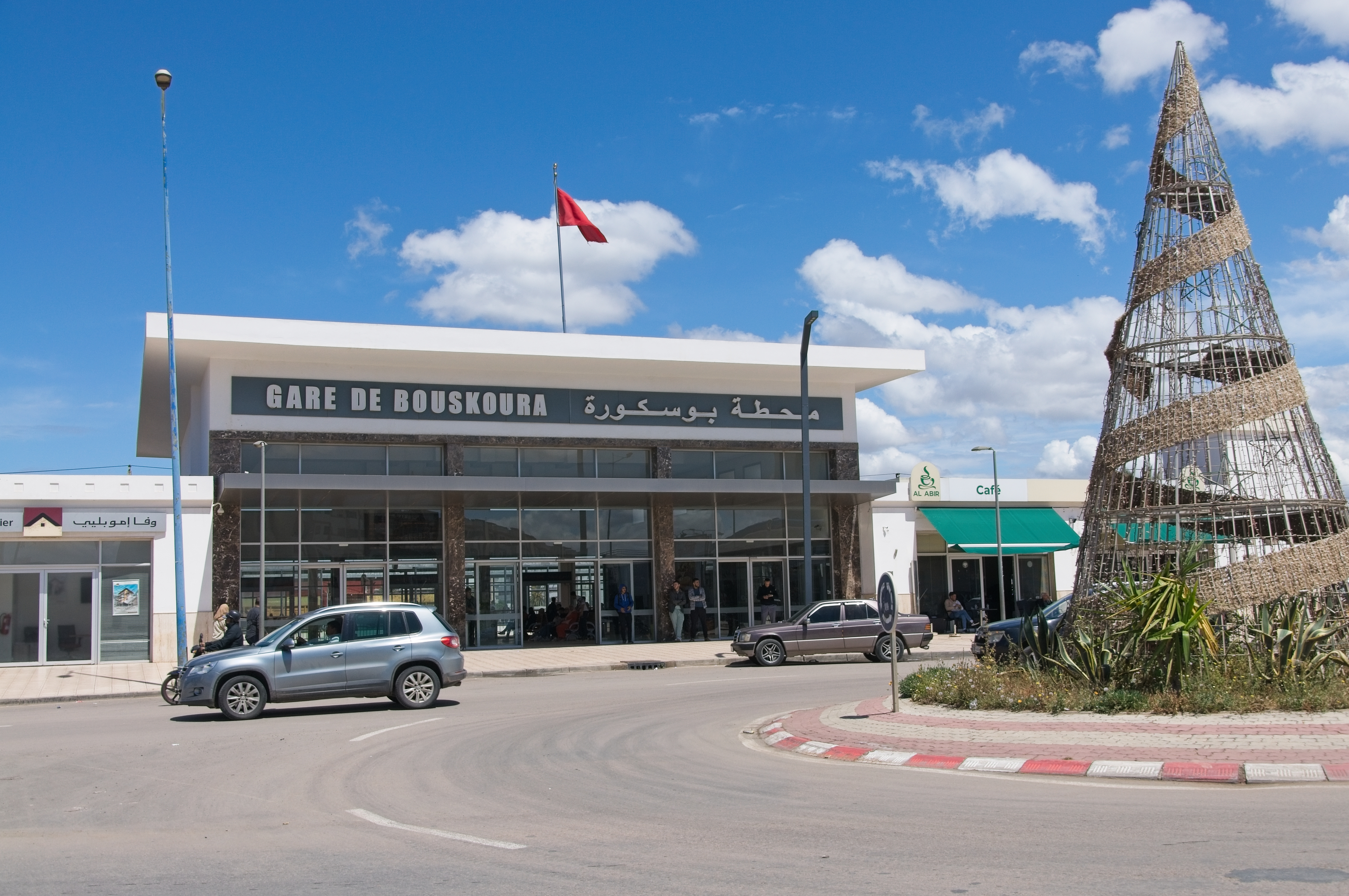
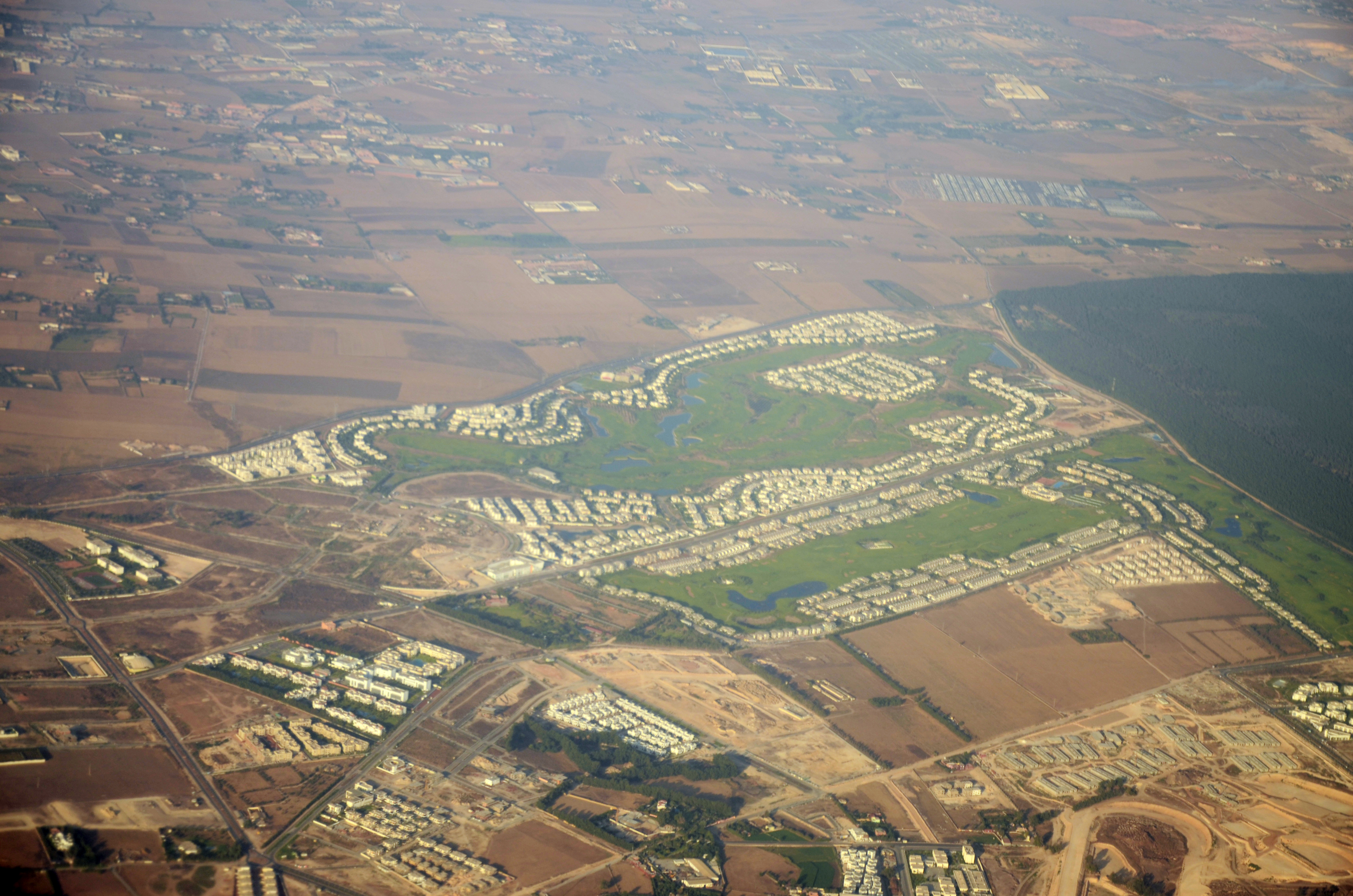
- Interactive map of Bouskoura
- Coordinates: 33°26′56″N 7°38′55″W
- Country: Morocco
- Region: Casablanca-Settat
- Province: Nouaceur

Area
  - Total: 97 sq mi (250 km^{2})
  - Land: 97 sq mi (250 km^{2})

Population (2024)
  - Total: 200,359
  - Density: 1,430/sq mi (554/km^{2})
- Time zone: UTC+0 (GMT)

Bouskoura (Arabic: بو سكورة, romanized: bū skūra) is a city in Morocco, situated in the suburban area of Casablanca. In year 2024 it had a population of 200,359 inhabitants. It has an important industrial zone.
