= 2026–27 Botola Pro 2 =

Association football league championship in Morocco

Botola Pro 2
- Season: 2026-27
- Dates: 26 September 2025 - TBD 2027
- Matches: 56
- Goals: 125 (2.23 per match)
- Biggest home win: OC Khouribga 4-0 CA Khénifra (3 October 2026); IZ Khemisset 4-0 SCC Mohammedia (7 November 2026)
- Biggest away win: JS Soualem 1-4 Olympic Dcheira (18 October 2026)
- Highest scoring: CA Khénifra 4-2 OC Safi (24 October 2026)
- Longest winning run: IZ Khemisset; US Yacoub Mansour (3 games each)
- Longest unbeaten run: US Yacoub Mansour (6 games)
- Longest winless run: US Boujaâd; SCC Mohammedia (7 games each)
- Longest losing run: JS Soualem; SCC Mohammedia (3 games each)
- All statistics correct as of 10 November 2026.

The 2026–27 Botola Pro 2, also known as Botola Pro 2 Inwi for sponsorship reasons, or just Botola 2, is the 65th season of the second division of the Moroccan football league.

The fixtures were released on 28 August 2026, and the season began on 26 September 2026, with four matches being played that day.

== Teams ==
A total of 16 teams will contest this league, with 11 maintained from the previous edition, 2 teams promoted from the 2025-26 National Amateur and 3 teams relegated from the 2025-26 Botola Pro.

=== Team changes ===
The following teams will change division after the 2025–26 season:

▲ Promoted from 2025-26 National Amateur	▼ Relegated from 2025–26 Botola Pro	▲ Promoted to 2026-27 Botola Pro	▼ Relegated to 2026-27 National Amateur
IZ Khemisset; OC Khouribga	Olympic Dcheira (Via Playoffs); US Yacoub Mansour; OC Safi	MA Tetouan; WS Temara; US Amal Tiznit (Via Playoffs)	Raja Beni Mellal; RAC Casablanca

=== Team Locations ===
Locations of the 2026–27 Botola Pro 2 teams
Sahara
Locations of the 2026-27 Botola Pro 2 teams

Team name	Acronym	Location	Stadium	Capacity
CA Khenifra	CAK	Khenifra	Municipal Stadium	10,000
CJ Ben Guerir	CJBG	Ben Guerir	Municipal Stadium	3,000
IZ Khemisset	IZK	Khemisset	18 November Stadium	10,000
JS Massira	JSM	Laayoune	Stade Moulay Rachid	5,000
JS Soualem	JSS	Soualem	Municipal Stadium (Berrechid)	5,000
Kenitra AC	KAC	Kenitra	Municipal Stadium	28,000
MC Oujda	MCO	Oujda	Honor Stadium	30,000
OC Khouribga	OCK	Khouribga	Phosphate Stadium	10,000
OC Safi	OCS	Safi	Stade El Massira	15,000
Olympic Dcheira	OD	Dcheira	Stade Ahmed Fana	5,000
Stade Marocain	SM	Rabat	Stade Ahmed-Chhoude	5,000
SCC Mohammedia	SCCM	Mohammedia	El Bachir Stadium	10,000
US Boujaâd	USB	Bejaad	Stade Abdelghani Mansouri	1,500
USM Oujda	USMO	Oujda	Municipal Stadium	10,000
US Yacoub Mansour	USYM	Rabat	Olympic Stadium	21,000
Wydad Fez	WAF	Fez	Stade Hassan-II	10,000

	Regions of Morocco	Number of teams	Teams
1	Rabat-Sale-Kenitra	4	IZ Khemisset, Kenitra AC, Stade Marocain and US Yacoub Mansour
2	Beni Mellal-Khenifra	3	CA Khenifra, OC Kouribga and US Boujaad
3	Casablanca-Settat	2	JS Soualem and SCC Mohammedia
3	Marrakech-Safi	2	CG Ben Guerir and OC Safi
3	Oriental	2	MC Oujda and USM Oujda
6	Fes-Meknes	1	Wydad Fez
6	Laayoune-Sakia El Hamra	1	JS Massira
6	Souss-Massa	1	Olympic Dcheira

== League table ==
Pos	Team	Pld	W	D	L	GF	GA	GD	Pts	Qualification or relegation
1	Olympic Dcheira	7	5	1	1	12	5	+7	16	Promotion to 2027–28 Botola Pro
2	IZ Khemisset	7	5	1	1	12	5	+7	16	Promotion to 2027–28 Botola Pro
3	Wydad Fez	7	5	1	1	14	6	+8	16	Qualification to promotion playoffs
4	US Yacoub Mansour	7	4	2	1	9	5	+4	14	Qualification to promotion playoffs
5	Stade Marocain	7	4	1	2	8	6	+2	13	
6	USM Oujda	7	3	3	1	8	8	0	12	
7	OC Khouribga	7	2	3	2	10	6	+4	9	
8	Kenitra AC	7	2	3	2	4	4	0	9	
9	OC Safi	7	2	3	2	7	8	−1	9	
10	MC Oujda	7	2	2	3	9	11	−2	8	
11	JS Massira	7	2	2	3	7	8	−1	8	
12	CJ Ben Guerir	7	2	1	4	7	8	−1	7	
13	JS Soualem	7	1	2	4	4	10	−6	5	Qualification to relegation playoffs
14	US Boujaâd	7	0	4	3	5	10	−5	4	Qualification to relegation playoffs
15	CA Khenifra	7	1	1	5	7	13	−6	4	Relegation to 2027–28 Amateur National
16	SCC Mohammedia	7	0	2	5	2	12	−10	2	Relegation to 2027–28 Amateur National

Updated to match(es) played on 10 November 2026. Source: FRMF.ma
Rules for classification: 1) Points; 2a) Head-to-head goal difference if they are two teams with equal points; 2b) Overall goal difference if they are more than two teams with equal points; 3) Number of wins; 4) Goals scored; 5) Play-off between involved teams if necessary.
Source: FRMF Competition ruleset: Article 53.2

== Results ==
Home \ Away	CAK	CJBG	IZK	JSM	JSS	KAC	MCO	OCK	OCS	OD	SM	SCCM	USB	USMO	USYM	WAF
Chabab Atlas Khenifra	—	-	-	-	-	-	-	-	-	-	-	-	-	-	-	-
Chabab Ben Guerir	-	—	-	-	-	-	-	-	-	-	-	-	-	-	-	-
IZ Khemisset	-	-	—	-	-	-	-	-	-	-	-	-	-	-	-	-
JS Massira	-	-	-	—	-	-	-	-	-	-	-	-	-	-	-	-
JS Soualem	-	-	-	-	—	-	-	-	-	-	-	-	-	-	-	-
Kenitra AC	-	-	-	-	-	—	-	-	-	-	-	-	-	-	-	0–1
Mouloudia Oujda	-	-	-	-	-	-	—	-	-	-	-	-	-	-	-	-
Olympic Khouribga	-	-	-	-	-	-	-	—	-	-	-	-	-	-	-	-
Olympic Safi	-	-	-	-	-	-	-	-	—	-	-	-	-	-	-	-
Olympic Dcheira	-	-	-	-	-	-	-	1–0	-	—	-	-	-	-	-	-
Stade Marocain	-	-	-	-	-	-	-	-	-		—	-	-	-	-	-
SCC Mohammedia	-	-	-	-	-	-	-	-	-	-	-	—	-	-	-	-
US Boujaad	-	-	-	-	-	-	-	-	0–0	-	-	-	—	-	-	-
USM Oujda	-	-	-	-	-	-	-	-	-	-	-	-	-	—	-	-
US Yacoub El Mansour	-	-	-	-	-	-	-	-	-	-	-	2–0	-	-	—	-
Wydad Fez	-	-	-	-	-	-	-	-	-	-	-	-	-	-	-	—

Updated to match(es) played on 26 September 2026. Source: FRMF.ma
Legend: Blue = home team win; Yellow = draw; Red = away team win.
For upcoming matches, an "a" indicates there is an article about the rivalry between the two participants.

== See also ==
- 2026–27 Botola Pro
