= 2026–27 Botola Pro =

Moroccan football league season

Botola Pro
- Season: 2026–27
- Dates: 24 September 2026 – TBD 2027
- Matches: 55
- Goals: 122 (2.22 per match)
- Top goalscorer: Imad Riahi; Abderrazak Ennakouss (6 goals each)
- Biggest home win: DH Jadida 4–1 MA Tétouan (17 Oct 2026)
- Biggest away win: DH Jadida 2–6 COD Meknes (26 Sep 2026)
- Highest scoring: DH Jadida 2–6 COD Meknes (26 Sep 2026)
- Longest winning run: KAC Marrakech (3 games)
- Longest unbeaten run: KAC Marrakech (7 games)
- Longest winless run: MA Tétouan; RCA Zemamra (7 games each)
- Longest losing run: WS Temara; MA Tétouan (4 games each)
- All statistics correct as of 9 November 2026.

The 2026–27 Botola Pro, also known as Botola Pro Inwi for sponsorship reasons, is the 70th season of the Botola Pro, the highest tier football league of Morocco. The fixtures were released on 28 August 2026, and the season began on 24 September 2026.

MAS Fez are the defending champions, and MA Tétouan, WS Témara and US Amal Tiznit are the three newly promoted teams.

== Summary ==
=== Developments ===
The 2026–27 season introduced several changes to the financial and administrative framework of the Botola Pro. The prize money for the champions was increased from MAD 6 million to MAD 10 million, while the prizes for the teams finishing second through fourth were also increased. For clubs finishing from fifth to sixteenth, a new merit-based system was introduced, with financial incentives linked in part to sporting performance and the development and integration of young players. The league also introduced a digital system to monitor the playing time of players under the age of 21 through the electronic match sheet, with additional financial incentives for clubs that give greater opportunities to young players.

The league retained its 16-team format for the 2026–27 season despite proposals to expand the competition to 20 clubs. In addition, the LNFP adopted a medical-joker system for the season, allowing clubs to replace players in cases of medically confirmed injuries under specified conditions. Promotion to the top division was also made subject to compliance with the league's licensing requirements, including infrastructure, administrative management and financial conditions, rather than sporting performance alone.

== Teams ==
A total of 16 teams will contest this league, including 13 from the previous edition and 3 teams promoted from the 2025-26 Botola Pro 2.

=== Team changes ===
The following teams will change division after 2025–26 Botola Pro:

▲ Promoted from 2025–26 Botola Pro 2	▼ Relegated from 2025–26 Botola Pro
MA Tétouan (after a year); WS Temara (first time); US Amal Tiznit (first time)	US Yacoub Mansour (after a year); OC Safi (after 22 years); Olympic Dcheira (after a year)

=== Stadium and locations ===
Team name	Acronym	Location	Stadium	Capacity
AS FAR	ASFAR	Rabat	Prince Moulay Abdellah Stadium	69,000
COD Meknes	CODM	Meknes	Honneur Stadium	20,000
DH Jadida	DHJ	El Jadida	El Abdi Stadium	10,000
FUS Rabat	FUS	Rabat	Moulay Hassan Stadium	22,000
HUS Agadir	HUSA	Agadir	El Bachir Stadium (Note: Adrar Stadium was under construction.)	10,000
IR Tanger	IRT	Tangier	Grand Stadium	75,000
MAS Fez	MAS	Fez	El Bachir Stadium (Note: Fez Stadium was closed or was under construction.)	20,000
KAC Marrakech	KACM	Marrakesh	El Harti Stadium (Note: Marrakesh Stadium is under construction.)	10,000
MA Tétouan	MAT	Tétouan	Saniat Rmel Stadium	7,000
Raja CA	RCA	Casablanca	Mohammed V Stadium	45,891
RCA Zemamra	RCAZ	Zemamra	Ahmed Choukri Stadium	2,500
RS Berkane	RSB	Berkane	Berkane Municipal Stadium	15,000
US Amal Tiznit	USAT	Tiznit	Berrechid Municipal Stadium (Note: Their home stadium does not meet requiments.)	10,000
UTS Rabat	UTS	Rabat	Al Medina Stadium	18,000
Wydad AC	WAC	Casablanca	Mohammed V Stadium	45,891
WS Temara	WST	Temara	Rabat Olympic Stadium (Note: Their home stadium does not meet requiments.)	21,000

	Regions of Morocco	Number of teams	Teams
1	Casablanca-Settat	4	DH Jadida, Raja CA, RCA Zemamra, Wydad AC
1	Rabat-Salé-Kénitra	4	AS FAR, FUS Rabat, UTS Rabat, WS Temara
3	Fez-Meknes	2	COD Meknes, MAS Fez
3	Souss-Massa	2	HUS Agadir, US Amal Tiznit
3	Tangier-Tétouan-Al Hoceima	2	IR Tanger, MA Tétouan
6	Marrakesh-Safi	1	KAC Marrakech
6	Oriental	1	RS Berkane

Locations of the 2026–27 Botola Pro teams

=== Personnel and kits ===
Team	Head coach	Captain	Kit manufacturer	Shirt sponsors (front)
AS FAR	(Portugal) Pedro Gonçalves	TBD	(Germany) Puma	
COD Meknes	(Portugal) Jorge Paixão	(Morocco) Adnane Berdad	(Morocco) AB Sport	Biougnach
DH El Jadida	(Portugal) Ricardo Chéu	(Morocco) Marouane Lemzaouri	(Germany) Jako	OCP, Mazagan
FUS Rabat	(Portugal) Ricardo Formosinho	(Morocco) Amine El Msane	(Spain) Joma	Novec, Cosumar
HUS Agadir	(Morocco) Hilal Et-Tair	(Morocco) Badreddine Abyir	(Germany) Puma	Afriquia
IR Tanger	(Algeria) Abdelhak Benchikha	(Morocco) Mohamed Saoud	(Spain) Joma	Tanger Med
KAC Marrakech	(Morocco) Youssef Safri	(Morocco) Mohamed Jemjami	(Morocco) AB Sport	Visit Marrakech, Pickalbatros
MAS Fez	(Morocco) Amine El Karma	(Morocco) Salaheddine Chihab	(United States) Nike	TGCC, VitrA
MA Tétouan	(Morocco) Barae Jroundi	TBD	(Morocco) Comba Sport	Tanger Med
Raja CA	(Morocco) Abdelkrim Jinani	(Morocco) Badr Benoun	(England) Umbro	Changan, Nor'Dar, Marsa Maroc, Pare-Brise Express
RCA Zemamra	(Morocco) Youssef Anis	(Morocco) Zakaria Bahrou	(Morocco) Bang Sports	IGASERG, BH Medical Groupe
RS Berkane	(Cape Verde) Bubista	(Morocco) Munir Mohamedi	(Morocco) Bang Sports	Thé Dahmiss, Viva, National Gaz
US Amal Tiznit	(Morocco) Abderrahim Chkilit	(Morocco) Abderrahmane Bifinzi	(Morocco) Bang Sports	Garcia, Kayna, Nor'Dar
UTS Rabat	(Morocco) Abdel Zamrat	(Morocco) Redouan Ait Lamkadem	(Italy) Macron	
WS Temara	(Morocco) Abdessalam Benjelloun	TBD	(Morocco) Bang Sports	
Wydad AC	(Tunisia) Nasreddine Nabi	TBD	(Italy) Kappa	Ingelec

=== Managerial changes ===
Teams	Outgoing manager	Manner of departure	Date of vacancy	Position in table	Incoming manager	Date of appointment
Wydad AC	(Morocco) Adil Hermach (caretaker)	End of Caretaker role	5 July 2026	Pre-season	(Portugal) Paulo Sérgio	26 July 2026
COD Meknes	(Morocco) Mohamed Aziz (Caretaker)	End of Caretaker role	5 July 2026	Pre-season	(Portugal) Jorge Paixão	26 July 2026
AS FAR	(Portugal) Alexandre Santos	Signed by Kuwait SC	7 July 2026	Pre-season	(Portugal) Pedro Gonçalves	9 July 2026
KAC Marrakech	(Morocco) Hicham Dmiai	End of contract	11 July 2026	Pre-season	(Morocco) Reda Hakam	12 July 2026
MAS Fez	(Spain) Pablo Franco	End of contract	14 July 2026	Pre-season	(Portugal) Rui Almeida	16 July 2026
DH El-Jadida	(Portugal) Rui Almeida	Signed by MAS Fez	16 July 2026	Pre-season	(Portugal) Ricardo Chéu	17 July 2026
RS Berkane	(Tunisia) Mouin Chaâbani	Signed by Tunisia	17 July 2026	Pre-season	(Cape Verde) Bubista	4 August 2026
KAC Marrakech	(Morocco) Reda Hakam	Mutual consent	17 July 2026	Pre-season	(Morocco) Youssef Safri	21 July 2026
FUS Rabat	(Morocco) Said Chiba	End of Contract	23 July 2026	Pre-season	(Portugal) Ricardo Formosinho	27 July 2026
UTS Rabat	(Morocco) Mimoun Moukhtari	End of Contract	12 August 2026	Pre-season	(Italy) Guglielmo Arena	12 August 2026
Raja CA	(Tunisia) Nasreddine Nabi	Mutual consent	31 August 2026	Pre-season	(Spain) Paco Jémez	31 August 2026
MA Tétouan	(Morocco) Abdelkrim Jinani	End of Contract	4 September 2026	Pre-season	(Morocco) Amine El Karma	5 September 2026
Wydad AC	(Portugal) Paulo Sérgio	Sacked	20 October 2026	9th	(Tunisia) Nasreddine Nabi	23 October 2026
RCA Zemamra	(Morocco) Mehdi Mrani Alaoui	Sacked	27 October 2026	16th	(Morocco) Youssef Anis	29 October 2026
Raja CA	(Spain) Paco Jémez	Sacked	2 November 2026	13th	(Morocco) Abdelkrim Jinani	4 November 2026
MAS Fez	(Portugal) Rui Almeida	Sacked	4 November 2026	8th	(Morocco) Amine El Karma	5 November 2026
MA Tétouan	(Morocco) Amine El Karma	Mutual agreement	4 November 2026	15th	(Morocco) Barae Jroundi	14 November 2026
UTS Rabat	(Italy) Guglielmo Arena	Terminated	19 November 2026	9th	(Morocco) Abdel Zamrat	19 November 2026

== League table ==
Pos	Team	Pld	W	D	L	GF	GA	GD	Pts	Qualification or relegation
1	KAC Marrakech	7	5	1	1	10	6	+4	16	Qualification for Champions League
2	COD Meknes	7	4	2	1	10	4	+6	14	Qualification for Champions League
3	Wydad AC	7	4	2	1	9	3	+6	14	Qualification for Confederation Cup
4	Raja CA	7	3	3	1	7	5	+2	12	
5	AS FAR	6	3	2	1	9	5	+4	11	
6	MAS Fez	7	3	2	2	6	5	+1	11	
7	IR Tanger	7	3	1	3	8	9	−1	10	
8	HUS Agadir	7	2	3	2	14	12	+2	9	
9	UTS Rabat	7	2	2	3	4	6	−2	8	
10	DH El Jadida	7	2	2	3	14	16	−2	8	
11	FUS Rabat	7	2	2	3	4	5	−1	8	
12	RS Berkane	6	1	5	0	6	4	+2	8	
13	US Amal Tiznit	7	2	1	4	8	12	−4	7	Qualification to relegation play-offs
14	WS Temara (Note: 1 point deduction)	7	2	1	4	5	7	−2	6	Qualification to relegation play-offs
15	MA Tétouan	7	0	3	4	2	10	−8	3	Relegation to Botola Pro 2
16	RCA Zemamra	7	0	2	5	6	13	−7	2	Relegation to Botola Pro 2

Updated to match(es) played on 9 November 2026. Source: FRMF.ma
Rules for classification: 1) Points; 2a) Head-to-head goal difference if they are two teams with equal points; 2b) Goal difference if they are more than two teams with equal points; 3) Number of wins; 4) Goals scored; 5) Play-off between involved teams.

== Results ==
Home \ Away	MAS	RSB	RCA	ASFAR	WAC	DHJ	IRT	FUS	CODM	KACM	RCAZ	HUSA	UTS	MAT	WST	USAT
MAS Fez	—	0–0 (Note: Played in Mohammedia)	0–0 (Note: Played in Meknes)					1–0 (Note: Played in Mohammedia)			2–1					
RS Berkane		—	2–0								2–2					
Raja CA			—				2–0				1–0	1–1				
AS FAR			1–2	—		3–1	2–0								1–0	
Wydad AC					—				0–0					1–0	3–0 (Note: The Wydad AC v WS Temara match originally finished as a 1–3 win for WS Temara. However, on 7 November 2026, the LNFP awarded the match as a 3–0 win to Wydad as WS Temara fielded the ineligible player Imad Babassa.)	1–1
DH El Jadida					0–2	—			2–6				1–1	4–1		
IR Tanger	2–1						—				1–0			1–1		
FUS Rabat			1–1					—				1–0				0–1
COD Meknes				0–0					—	0–1			1–0			
KAC Marrakech					2–1	1–1	2–1			—		2–3				
RCA Zemamra								0–1			—	2–5			1–1	
HUS Agadir	1–2 (Note: Played in Mohammedia)	2–2 (Note: Played in Mohammedia)		2–2 (Note: Played in Mohammedia)								—				
UTS Rabat		0–0			0–1			2–1					—			0–2
MA Tétouan		0–0						0–0	0–1					—	0–3	
WS Temara	1–0									0–1			0–1		—	
US Amal Tiznit						2–5 (Note: Played in Mohammedia)	1–3 (Note: Played in Mohammedia)		1–2 (Note: Played in Berrechid)	0–1 (Note: Played in Berrechid)						—

Updated to match(es) played on 9 November 2026. Source: FRMF.ma
Legend: Blue = home team win; Yellow = draw; Red = away team win.
For upcoming matches, an "a" indicates there is an article about the rivalry between the two participants.

== Season statistics ==
As of 9 November 2026

=== Top scorers ===
Rank	Player	Club	Goals
1	(Morocco) Imad Riahi	HUS Agadir	6
1	(Morocco) Abderrazak Ennakouss	DH El Jadida	6
3	(Morocco) Youssef El Fahli	AS FAR	5
3	(Morocco) Zakaria Essalhi	US Amal Tiznit	5
5	(Republic of the Congo) Silvère Ganvoula	Wydad AC	4
5	(Morocco) Saleh Al Sellami	KAC Marrakech	4

=== Hat-tricks ===
Player	For	Against	Result	Date
(Morocco) Abderrazak Ennakouss^{4}	DH El Jadida	US Amal Tiznit	2–5 (A)	10 October 2026

=== Clean sheets ===
Rank	Player	Club	Clean sheets
1	(Morocco) Anas Zniti	COD Meknes	4
2	(Morocco) Munir El Kajoui	RS Berkane	3
2	(Morocco) El Mehdi Al Harrar	Raja CA	3
2	(Morocco) Amine El Ouaad	KAC Marrakech	3
2	(Morocco) Ahmed Reda Tagnaouti	AS FAR	3
2	(Morocco) Ayoub Lakred	FUS Rabat	3
2	(Morocco) Salaheddine Chihab	MAS Fez	3

=== Discipline ===
==== Player ====
- Most yellow cards: 4
  - (Morocco) Achraf Harmach (MAS Fez)
  - (Morocco) Noureddine Oussama (MAS Fez)
  - (Morocco) Ayoub El Khaffi (DH El-Jadida)
- Most red cards: 1
  - 12 players

==== Club ====
- Most yellow cards: 26
  - DH El-Jadida
- Fewest yellow cards: 10
  - RCA Zemamra
- Most red cards: 2
  - KAC Marrakech
- Fewest red cards: 0
  - 6 clubs

== See also ==
- 2026–27 Botola Pro 2
- 2026–27 CAF Champions League
- 2026–27 CAF Confederation Cup
