= 2025–26 Botola Pro 2 =

Association football league championship in Morocco

Botola 2
- Season: 2025-26
- Dates: 27 September 2025 - 5 July 2026 (Regular Season); 17-22 July 2026 (Play-offs)
- Champions: Moghreb Tetouan (7th title)
- Promoted: Moghreb Tetouan; Wydad Temara; US Amal Tiznit (via play-offs)
- Relegated: Racing Casablanca; Raja Beni Mellal
- Matches: 240
- Goals: 474 (1.98 per match)
- Biggest home win: Chabab Ben Guerir 4–0 Chabab Atlas Khenifra (28 March 2026); Chabab Atlas Khenifra 4–0 Mouloudia Oujda (2 May 2026); US Boujaad 4-0 Racing Casablanca (5 July 2026)
- Biggest away win: 0-3 (5 Times)
- Highest scoring: SCC Mohammedia 4-3 Kenitra AC (5 July 2026)
- Longest winning run: Stade Marocain; 5 matches
- Longest unbeaten run: Amal Tiznit; 18 matches
- Longest winless run: Raja Beni Mellal; 14 matches
- Longest losing run: Stade Marocain; USM Oujda; 4 matches

The 2025–26 Botola Pro 2, also known as Botola Pro 2 Inwi for sponsorship reasons, or just Botola 2, was the 66th season of Botola 2, the second division of the Moroccan football league.

Competition began on the 27th of September 2025, and, due to organizational issues regarding the match calendar, ended on the 5th July 2026, with the playoffs happening from the 17th to the 22nd of July 2026, even with the 2026 FIFA World Cup happening at the same time.

== Teams ==
A total of 16 teams contested this league, featuring 10 from the previous edition, 3 teams promoted from the 2024-25 Amateur National League and 3 teams relegated from the 2024-25 Botola Pro.

The following teams changed division in the previous season:

| ▲ Promoted from 2024–25 Amateur National | ▼ Relegated from 2024–25 Botola Pro | ▲ Promoted to 2025-26 Botola Pro | ▼ Relegated to 2025-26 Amateur National |
|---|---|---|---|
| Wydad Temara; US Amal Tiznit; US Boujaad (via play-offs) | JS Soualem (via play-offs); Moghreb Tetouan; SCC Mohammedia | Kawkab Marrakech; US Yacoub El Mansour; Olympic Dcheira (via play-offs) | Youssoufia Berrechid (via play-offs); Rapid Oued Zem; Olympic Khouribga |

=== Team Locations ===
Locations of the 2026–27 Botola 2 teams
Sahara
Locations of the 2026-27 Botola 2 teams

=== Stadiums ===
| Team name | Acronym | Location | Stadium | Capacity |
|---|---|---|---|---|
| Chabab Atlas Khenifra | CAK | Khenifra | Municipal Stadium (Khenifra) | 10,000 |
| Chabab Ben Guerir | CJBG | Ben Guerir | Municipal Stadium (Ben Guerir) | 3,000 |
| JS Massira | JSM | Laayoune | Moulay Rachid Stadium | 5,000 |
| JS Soualem | JSS | Soualem | Municipal Stadium (Berrechid) | 5,000 |
| Kenitra AC | KAC | Kenitra | Municipal Stadium (Kenitra) | 15,000 |
| MA Tetouan | MAT | Tetouan | Saniat Rmel Stadium | 7,000 |
| Mouloudia Oujda | MCO | Oujda | Honneur Stadium (Oujda) | 30,000 |
| Racing Casablanca | RAC | Casablanca | Père Jégo Stadium | 10,000 |
| Raja Beni Mellal | RBM | Beni Mellal | Honneur stadium (Beni Mellal) | 12,000 |
| SCC Mohammedia | SCCM | Mohammedia | El Bachir Stadium | 15,000 |
| Stade Marocain | SM | Rabat | Ahmed-Chhoude Stadium | 5,000 |
| US Amal Tiznit | USAT | Tiznit | El Massira Stadium (Tiznit) | 4,000 |
| US Boujaad | USB | Bejaad | Abdelghani Mansouri Stadium | 1,500 |
| US Musulmane d'Oujda | USMO | Oujda | Municipal Stadium (Oujda) | 10,000 |
| Wydad Fes | WAF | Fes | Hassan-II Stadium | 10,000 |
| Wydad Temara | WST | Temara | Yacoub El Mansour Stadium | 5,000 |

=== By Region ===
| | Regions of Morocco | Number of teams | Teams |
|---|---|---|---|
| 1 | Beni Mellal-Khenifra | 3 | CA Khenifra, Raja Beni Mellal and US Boujaad |
| 1 | Rabat-Sale-Kenitra | 3 | Kenitra AC, Stade Marocain and Wydad Temara |
| 1 | Casablanca-Settat | 3 | Racing Casablanca, JS Soualem and SCC Mohammedia |
| 4 | Oriental | 2 | MC Oujda and USM Oujda |
| 5 | Fes-Meknes | 1 | WA Fes |
| 5 | Laayoune-Sakia El Hamra | 1 | JS Massira |
| 5 | Marrakech-Safi | 1 | CG Ben Guerir |
| 5 | Souss-Massa | 1 | US Amal Tiznit |
| 5 | Tanger-Tetouan-Al Hoceima | 1 | Moghreb Tetouan |

== League table ==
| Pos | Team | Pld | W | D | L | GF | GA | GD | Pts | Qualification or relegation |
|---|---|---|---|---|---|---|---|---|---|---|
| 1 | Moghreb Tetouan (C, P) | 30 | 14 | 11 | 5 | 33 | 22 | +11 | 53 (Note: Head-to-head goal differnce: MAT +2; WST -2) | Promotion to 2026–27 Botola Pro |
| 2 | Wydad Temara (P) | 30 | 13 | 14 | 3 | 36 | 26 | +10 | 53 | Promotion to 2026–27 Botola Pro |
| 3 | Amal Tiznit (O, P) | 30 | 10 | 16 | 4 | 36 | 26 | +10 | 46 | Qualification to promotion playoffs |
| 4 | JS Massira | 30 | 11 | 11 | 8 | 29 | 21 | +8 | 44 | Qualification to promotion playoffs |
| 5 | Chabab Atlas Khenifra | 30 | 11 | 10 | 9 | 26 | 24 | +2 | 43 | |
| 6 | JS Soualem | 30 | 10 | 12 | 8 | 37 | 35 | +2 | 42 | |
| 7 | Stade Marocain | 30 | 11 | 8 | 11 | 23 | 24 | −1 | 41 | |
| 8 | Wydad Fez | 30 | 9 | 11 | 10 | 34 | 30 | +4 | 38 | |
| 9 | US Musulmane d'Oujda | 30 | 9 | 10 | 11 | 29 | 30 | −1 | 37 (Note: Ranked ahead of Mouloudia Oujda and Chabab Ben Guerir on overall goal differnce) | |
| 10 | Mouloudia Oujda | 30 | 8 | 13 | 9 | 35 | 38 | −3 | 37 (Note: Tied on overall goal difference and number of wins. Mouloudia Oujda was ranked higher for having scored more goals.) | |
| 11 | Chabab Ben Guerir | 30 | 8 | 13 | 9 | 25 | 28 | −3 | 37 | |
| 12 | SCC Mohammedia | 30 | 9 | 9 | 12 | 25 | 37 | −12 | 36 (Note: Head-to-head goal difference: SCCM +2, KAC -2) | |
| 13 | Kenitra AC (O) | 30 | 8 | 12 | 10 | 35 | 36 | −1 | 36 | Qualification to relegation playoffs |
| 14 | US Boujaad (O) | 30 | 7 | 14 | 9 | 25 | 22 | +3 | 35 | Qualification to relegation playoffs |
| 15 | Raja Beni Mellal (R) | 30 | 7 | 11 | 12 | 25 | 32 | −7 | 32 | Relegation to 2026–27 Amateur National |
| 16 | Racing Casablanca (R) | 30 | 3 | 9 | 18 | 21 | 43 | −22 | 18 | Relegation to 2026–27 Amateur National |

Updated to match(es) played on 13 August 2026. Source: FRMF
Rules for classification: 1) Points; 2a) Head-to-head goal difference if they are two teams with equal points; 2b) Overall goal difference if they are more than two teams with equal points; 3) Number of wins; 4) Goals scored; 5) Play-off between involved teams if necessary.
Source: FRMF Competition ruleset: Article 53.2
(C) Champions; (O) Play-off winners; (P) Promoted; (R) Relegated

== Results ==
| Home \ Away | CAK | CJBG | JSM | JSS | KAC | MAT | MCO | RAC | RBM | SM | SCCM | USAT | USB | USMO | WAF | WST |
|---|---|---|---|---|---|---|---|---|---|---|---|---|---|---|---|---|
| Chabab Atlas Khenifra | — | 2–0 | 1–0 | 1–1 | 2–1 | 0–1 | 4–0 | 1–0 | 0–0 | 1–0 | 1–0 | 0–1 | 2–0 | 1–2 | 1–1 | 1–1 |
| Chabab Ben Guerir | 4–0 | — | 0–0 | 1–3 | 1–0 | 1–1 | 1–1 | 1–0 | 1–1 | 1–0 | 0–0 | 1–0 | 0–0 | 2–1 | 1–0 | 1–2 |
| JS Massira | 3–0 | 2–0 | — | 3–0 | 1–1 | 0–0 | 1–1 | 2–1 | 3–1 | 1–0 | 1–0 | 1–1 | 0–0 | 1–0 | 3–2 | 0–0 |
| JS Soualem | 0–1 | 1–1 | 0–0 | — | 2–2 | 0–0 | 1–1 | 0–0 | 1–1 | 1–2 | 1–1 | 1–1 | 1–0 | 2–0 | 1–0 | 1–2 |
| Kenitra AC | 1–1 | 1–1 | 1–0 | 1–2 | — | 2–2 | 1–0 | 3–1 | 3–1 | 1–0 | 0–1 | 2–1 | 2–1 | 0–0 | 0–2 | 1–2 |
| Moghreb Tetouan | 2–1 | 2–1 | 1–1 | 0–1 | 1–1 | — | 1–0 | 0–0 | 2–0 | 1–0 | 1–0 | 3–1 | 1–0 | 2–0 | 0–0 | 1–1 |
| Mouloudia Oujda | 1–0 | 1–1 | 1–0 | 1–1 | 1–1 | 1–3 | — | 1–1 | 1–1 | 3–0 | 0–0 | 1–1 | 0–3 | 2–1 | 1–1 | 0–1 |
| Racing Casablanca | 0–1 | 0–1 | 1–2 | 2–3 | 0–2 | 0–2 | 3–0 | — | 1–0 | 0–1 | 2–0 | 2–2 | 0–2 | 0–3 | 0–0 | 1–1 |
| Raja Beni Mellal | 3–0 (Note: Match awarded to Raja Beni Mellal due to the presence on the pitch of Chabab Atlas Khenifra head coach Chakib Jbar, who was suspended from this match for yellow card accumulation.) | 0–0 | 1–0 | 1–2 | 1–0 | 2–0 | 3–2 | 1–0 | — | 0–0 | 2–0 | 1–1 | 0–0 | 0–0 | 1–2 | 1–1 |
| Stade Marocain | 0–0 | 2–0 | 1–0 | 1–2 | 1–1 | 2–2 | 1–3 | 1–1 | 1–0 | — | 3–0 | 0–1 | 0–0 | 1–0 | 2–0 | 0–1 |
| SCC Mohammedia | 0–3 | 1–0 | 1–3 | 2–2 | 4–3 | 1–0 | 2–4 | 1–0 | 1–0 | 0–1 | — | 3–1 | 1–1 | 1–0 | 0–3 | 1–1 |
| Amal Tiznit | 0–0 | 3–1 | 1–0 | 2–1 | 2–1 | 0–0 | 1–1 | 2–2 | 2–0 | 3–0 | 1–1 | — | 0–0 | 2–0 | 2–0 | 0–0 |
| US Boujaad | 0–0 | 2–1 | 0–0 | 1–0 | 1–1 | 2–0 | 0–1 | 4–0 | 2–1 | 0–1 | 0–0 | 1–1 | — | 2–2 | 1–1 | 2–2 |
| US Musulmane d'Oujda | 1–1 | 1–1 | 1–1 | 3–2 | 1–1 | 3–0 | 0–3 | 3–1 | 3–0 | 0–1 | 1–1 | 0–0 | 1–0 | — | 1–0 | 0–0 |
| Wydad Fez | 1–0 | 1–1 | 3–0 | 1–2 | 2–0 | 0–1 | 2–2 | 2–2 | 1–1 | 0–0 | 0–1 | 2–2 | 1–0 | 2–0 | — | 2–3 |
| Wydad Temara | 0–0 | 1–1 | 1–0 | 3–2 | 1–1 | 1–3 | 2–1 | 1–0 | 2–1 | 1–1 | 2–1 | 1–1 | 2–0 | 0–1 | 0–1 | — |

Updated to match(es) played on 5 July 2026. Source: FRMF
Legend: Blue = home team win; Yellow = draw; Red = away team win.
For upcoming matches, an "a" indicates there is an article about the rivalry between the two participants.

== Promotion/relegation play-offs ==
The teams finishing 3rd and 4th faced off against 14th and 13th from Botola Pro, respectively, while the teams finishing 13th and 14th faced off against 4th and 3rd from National Amateur, respectively.

Botola Pro 1 Vs Botola Pro 2

18 July 2026
15:00

| US Amal Tiznit | 0 - 0 | Olympic Dcheira |
|---|---|---|
| Koumah (red card) 86' | Report |

El Abdi Stadium, El Jadida

21 July 2026
19:00

| Olympic Dcheira | 1 - 1 | US Amal Tiznit |
|---|---|---|
| El Khafi 58' | Report | Essalhi 66' |

Municipal Stadium, Berrechid

1-1 on aggregate. US Amal Tiznit won on Away Goals and got promoted to the 2026-27 Botola Pro, while Olympic Dcheira got relegated to the 2026-27 Botola 2.

17 July 2026
20:00

| JS Massira | 1 - 1 | UTS Rabat |
|---|---|---|
| El Filal 9' (P) | Report | Arjoune 65' |

El Bachir Stadium, Mohammedia

21 July 2026
19:00

| UTS Rabat | 3 - 0 | JS Massira |
|---|---|---|
| Walid Rhailouf 85'; Omar Arjoune 90'; Mohamed Fouzair 90+6' | Report |

Al Medina Stadium, Rabat

UTS Rabat won 4-1 on Aggregate. Therefore, both teams remain in their respective divisions.

Botola Pro 2 Vs Amateur National

18 July 2026
19:00

| Rapid Oued Zem | 0 - 1 | US Boujaad |
|---|---|---|
| | Report | Lahyane 45+1' (o.g.) |

Municipal Stadium, Oued Zem

22 July 2026
19:00

| US Boujaad | 4 - 1 | Rapid Oued Zem |
|---|---|---|
| Hafidi 12' 85'; Essabiri 53'; Dahr 77' (o.g.) | Report | Bel Morel 83' |

Complexe OCP, Khouribga
Referee: Mohammed Lahouidri

US Boujaad won 5-1 on aggregate. Therefore, both teams remain in their respective divisions.

18 July 2026
19:00

| AS Mansouria | 0 - 0 | Kenitra AC |
|---|---|---|
| | Report |

El Bachir Stadium, Mohammedia
Referee: Hicham Temensani

22 July 2026
19:00

| Kenitra AC | 2 - 0 | AS Mansouria |
|---|---|---|
| Sabile 60'; Naji 65' | Report |

Ben M'Hamed El Abdi Stadium, El Jadida
Referee: Azzedine Aboulfaid

KAC won 2-0 on aggregate. Therefore, both teams remain in their respective divisions.

== See also ==
- 2025-26 Botola Pro
