= 2024–25 Botola Pro =

Moroccan football league season

Botola Pro
- Season: 2024–25
- Dates: 30 August 2024 – 31 May 2025
- Champions: RS Berkane (1st title)
- Relegated: JS Soualem (via play-offs); MA Tétouan; SCC Mohammédia
- CAF Champions League: RS Berkane; AS FAR
- CAF Confederation Cup: Wydad AC; OC Safi (throne cup winner)
- Matches: 240
- Goals: 555 (2.31 per match)
- Top goalscorer: Youssef El Fahli (11 goals)
- Biggest away win: SCC Mohammédia 0–6 Raja CA (12 May 2025)
- Highest scoring: SCC Mohammédia 0–6 Raja CA (12 May 2025); Fath US 5–1 COD Meknès (23 December 2024)
- Longest winning run: RS Berkane (6 matches)
- Longest unbeaten run: RS Berkane (25 matches)
- Longest winless run: SCC Mohammédia (30 matches)
- Longest losing run: SCC Mohammédia (10 matches)
- All statistics correct as of 31 May 2025.

The 2024–25 Botola Pro, also known as Botola Pro Inwi for sponsorship reasons, was the 68th season of the Botola, the highest tier football league of Morocco. Raja CA were the defending champions, and COD Meknès and Difaâ El Jadidi were the two newly promoted teams. Wydad drew the highest average home attendance with 23,880, followed by Raja with 22,120.

The fixtures were released on Friday 10 August at 21:00 UTC. The summer transfer window opened on Monday 1 July 2024 and closed at 22:59 UTC on Thursday 19 September 2024. The winter window opened on Wednesday 1 January 2025 and closed at 23:00 on Friday 31 January 2025.

== Teams ==
A total of 16 teams contested the league, including 14 sides from the 2023–24 season and 2 promoted teams from 2023–24 Botola Pro 2.

=== Stadium and locations ===
Locations of the 2024–25 Botola teams

Team name	Acronym	Location	Stadium	Capacity
AS FAR	ASFAR	Rabat	Prince Moulay Abdellah Stadium	45,000
COD Meknès	CODM	Meknès	Honneur Stadium	20,000
Difaâ El Jadidi	DHJ	El Jadida	Stade El Abdi	10,000
Fath Union Sport	FUS	Rabat	Stade Moulay Hassan	12,000
Hassania Agadir	HUSA	Agadir	Stade Adrar	45,480
IR Tanger	IRT	Tanger	Stade Ibn Batouta	65,000
JS Soualem	JSS	Soualem	Stade Municipal de Berrechid	5,000
Maghreb de Fès	MAS	Fez	Fez Stadium	45,000
Moghreb Tétouan	MAT	Tétouan	Saniat Rmel	10,000
Olympic Safi	OCS	Safi	Stade El Massira	15,000
Raja CA	RCA	Casablanca	Mohammed V Stadium	45,891
RCA Zemamra	RCAZ	Zemamra	Stade Ahmed Choukri	5,000
RS Berkane	RSB	Berkane	Berkane Municipal Stadium	15,000
Chabab Mohammédia	SCCM	Mohammédia	Stade El Bachir	15,000
Union de Touarga	UTS	Rabat	Stade Moulay Hassan	12,000
Wydad AC	WAC	Casablanca	Mohammed V Stadium	45,891

=== Personnel and kits ===
Team	Head coach	Captain	Kit manufacturer	Shirt sponsors (front)
AS FAR	(Portugal) Alexandre Santos	(Morocco) Mohamed Rabie Hrimat	(Germany) Uhlsport	
COD Meknès	(Morocco) Abdellatif Jrindou	(Morocco) Mouhcine Rabja	(Morocco) AB Sport	Biougnach, InterPub^{1}, Dante^{2}
DH El Jadidi	(Portugal) Rui Almeida	(Morocco) Youssef Aguerdoum	(Germany) Jako	TGCC, Mazagan
FUS Rabat	(Morocco) Saïd Chiba	(Morocco) El Mehdi El Bassil	(Germany) Uhlsport	Novec, Cosumar^{3}, LafargeHolcim Maroc^{1}
HUS Agadir	(Morocco) Abdelhadi Sektioui	(Morocco) Yassine Rami	(Morocco) Bang Sports	Afriquia, Skoda^{1}, Moov'up^{2}
IR Tanger	(Morocco) Hilal Et-tair	(Morocco) Nouaman Aarab	(Morocco) Gloria Sport	Tanger-Med
JS Soualem	(Morocco) Redouane El Haimer	(Morocco) Jad Assouab	(Morocco) Bang Sports	MARSBET, Asta
Maghreb AS	(Germany) Tomislav Stipić	(Morocco) Achraf Harmach	(Italy) Kappa	TGCC, Asta^{1}
MA Tétouan	(Morocco) Jamaleddine Drideb	(Morocco) Zaid Krouch	(Morocco) Comba Sport	Tanger-Med, Cafés Carrion^{1}, Municipality of Tetouan^{2}
OC Safi	(Morocco) Amine El Karma	(Morocco) Mohamed El Mourabit	(Morocco) Bang Sports	Fitco, ocstore.ma^{1}
Raja CA	(Tunisia) Lassaad Chabbi	(Morocco) Anas Zniti	(England) Umbro	1xBet, Kayna, Sofac^{3}, Nor'Dar, Marsa Maroc^{1}, Anker^{2}^{3}
RCA Zemamra	(Morocco) Mohamed Amine Benhachem	(Morocco) Abdelkhalek Ahmidouch	(Morocco) Bang Sports	IGASER
RS Berkane	(Tunisia) Mouin Chaâbani	(Burkina Faso) Issoufou Dayo	(Morocco) Bang Sports	Thé Dahmiss, GoldVision^{1}, National Gaz^{1}
SCC Mohammédia	(Morocco) Redouane Derdouri	(Morocco) Abdelhak Assal	(Morocco) Chabab	Sabera Plast
US Touarga	(Morocco) Abdelouahed Zamrat	(Morocco) Achraf Harmach	(Italy) Macron	
Wydad AC	(South Africa) Rhulani Mokwena	(Morocco) Jamal Harkass	(Italy) Macron	Ingelec, Boule d'Or^{1}, Sama Immobilier^{1}, Alitkane^{2}

1. On the back of shirt.
2. On the sleeves.
3. On the shorts.
Additionally, referee kits are made by Puma.

== Managerial changes ==
Teams	Outgoing manager	Manner of departure	Date of vacancy	Position in table	Incoming manager	Date of appointment
Fath US	(Morocco) Jamal Sellami	End of contract	22 June 2024	Pre-season	(Morocco) Saïd Chiba	23 July 2024
COD Meknès	(Morocco) Abdelaziz Dnibi	End of contract	23 June 2024	Pre-season	(Tunisia) Abdelhay Ben Soltane	9 July 2024
Wydad AC	(Morocco) Aziz Ben Askar	End of contract	23 June 2024	Pre-season	(South Africa) Rhulani Mokwena	11 July 2024
OC Safi	(Morocco) Adil Serraj (interim)	End of caretaker spell	27 June 2024	Pre-season	(Morocco) Amine El Karma	27 June 2024
MAS Fez	(Tunisia) Abdelhay Ben Soltane	Mutual consent	June 2024	Pre-season	(Italy) Guglielmo Arena	28 July 2024
AS FAR	(Tunisia) Nasreddine Nabi	End of contract	3 July 2024		(Poland) Czesław Michniewicz	13 July 2024
Raja CA	(Germany) Josef Zinnbauer	Mutual consent	22 July 2024		(Bosnia and Herzegovina) Rusmir Cviko	25 July 2024
SCC Mohammédia	(Morocco) Noureddine Ziyati	Sacked	August 2024		(Morocco) Redouane Derdouri	August 2024
Moghreb Tétouan	(Morocco) Abdellatif Jrindou	Mutual consent	17 August 2024		(Croatia) Dalibor Starčević	18 August 2024
Raja CA	(Bosnia and Herzegovina) Rusmir Cviko	Sacked	28 September 2024		(Morocco) Abdelkrim Jinani (interim)	28 September 2024
Raja CA	(Morocco) Abdelkrim Jinani (interim)	End of caretaker spell	9 October 2024		(Portugal) Ricardo Sá Pinto	10 October 2024
AS FAR	(Poland) Czesław Michniewicz	Mutual consent	15 October 2024		(France) Hubert Velud	16 October 2024
Difaâ El Jadidi	(Portugal) Jorge Paixão	Mutual consent	13 October 2024		(Morocco) Zakaria Aboub	13 October 2024
Moghreb Tétouan	(Croatia) Dalibor Starčević	Mutual consent	13 October 2024		(Morocco) Aziz El Amri	15 October 2024
COD Meknès	(Tunisia) Abdelhay Ben Soltane	Sacked	2 December 2024	14th	(Morocco) Abdellatif Jrindou	4 December 2024
Moghreb Tétouan	(Morocco) Aziz El Amri	Sacked	21 December 2024	15th	(Morocco) Mohamed Lakhal (interim)	21 December 2024
Raja CA	(Portugal) Ricardo Sá Pinto	Mutual consent	20 December 2024	6th	(Morocco) Hafid Abdessadek (interim)	20 December 2024
MAS Fez	(Italy) Guglielmo Arena	Mutual consent	24 December 2024	7th	(Morocco) Akram Roumani	22 January 2025
Moghreb Tétouan	(Morocco) Mohamed Lakhal (interim)	End of caretaker spell	6 January 2025	15th	(Morocco) Mohammed Benchrifa	6 January 2025
Difaâ El Jadidi	(Morocco) Zakaria Aboub	Sacked	21 January 2025	10th	(Portugal) Rui Almeida	26 January 2025
Raja CA	(Morocco) Hafid Abdessadek	Mutual consent	5 February 2025	8th	(Tunisia) Lassaad Chabbi	5 February 2025
AS FAR	(France) Hubert Velud	Mutual consent	5 February 2025	3rd	(Portugal) Alexandre Santos	8 February 2025
Moghreb Tétouan	(Morocco) Mohammed Benchrifa	Mutual consent	19 February 2025	15th	(Morocco) Jamaleddine Drideb	19 February 2025
MAS Fez	(Morocco) Akram Roumani	Mutual consent	18 February 2025	6th	(Germany) Tomislav Stipić	5 March 2025

== League table ==
Pos	Team	Pld	W	D	L	GF	GA	GD	Pts	Qualification or relegation
1	RS Berkane (C)	30	21	7	2	49	14	+35	70	Qualification for Champions League
2	AS FAR	30	16	9	5	48	24	+24	57	Qualification for Champions League
3	Wydad AC	30	14	12	4	45	27	+18	54	Qualification for Confederation Cup
4	FUS Rabat	30	14	8	8	53	26	+27	50	
5	Raja CA	30	12	12	6	38	25	+13	48	
6	RCA Zemamra	30	14	5	11	34	29	+5	47	
7	MAS Fès	30	12	10	8	34	29	+5	46	
8	Olympic Safi	30	12	10	8	37	33	+4	46	Qualification for Confederation Cup (Note: Olympic Safi qualified for the CAF Confederation Cup by winning the 2024–25 Moroccan Throne Cup.)
9	Difaâ El Jadidi	30	11	9	10	36	42	−6	42	
10	IR Tanger	30	9	10	11	35	37	−2	37	
11	COD Meknès	30	9	9	12	27	44	−17	36	
12	Union de Touarga	30	8	11	11	29	34	−5	35	
13	Hassania Agadir (O)	30	9	5	16	31	38	−7	32	Qualification to relegation play-offs
14	JS Soualem (R)	30	6	7	17	21	42	−21	25	Qualification to relegation play-offs
15	MA Tétouan (R)	30	5	8	17	25	40	−15	23	Relegation to Botola 2
16	SCC Mohammédia (R)	30	0	4	26	13	71	−58	4	Relegation to Botola 2

Source: FRMF.ma
Rules for classification: 1) Points; 2a) Head-to-head goal difference if they are two teams with equal points; 2b) Goal difference if they are more than two teams with equal points; 3) Number of wins; 4) Goals scored; 5) Play-off between involved teams.
(C) Champions; (O) Play-off winners; (R) Relegated

== Promotion/relegation play-offs ==
24 May 2025
17:00

Olympique Dcheira	1–2	JS Soualem
	Report

Ahmed Fanna Stadium, Dcheira El Jihadia
30 May 2025
16:00

JS Soualem	0–3	Olympique Dcheira
	Report

Berrechid Municipal Stadium, Berrechid

Olympique Dcheira won 4–2 on aggregate.

25 May 2025
17:00

Raja Beni Mellal	0–0	Hassania Agadir
	Report

Phosphate Stadium, Khouribga
31 May 2025
16:00

Hassania Agadir	1–0	Raja Beni Mellal
	Report

Adrar Stadium, Agadir

Hassania Agadir won 1–0 on aggregate.

== See also ==
- 2024–25 CAF Champions League
- 2024–25 CAF Confederation Cup
- 2024–25 Moroccan Women's Championship
- 2024–25 Moroccan Throne Cup
- 2024–25 Excellence Cup
- 2025 FIFA Club World Cup

== Attendances ==
Club	Average attendance
Wydad	23,880
Raja	22,120
AS FAR	22,119
CODM	6,512
IR Tanger	5,150
FUS	5,124
OC Safi	4,732
Difaâ El-Jadidi	4,320
HUSA	4,100
JS Soualem	4,298
MA Tétouan	3,547
RS Berkane	3,217
MAS	2,875
Union de Touarga	2,900
RCA Zemamra	2,450
SCC Mohammédia	1,482
