= 2011–12 Botola Pro =

Moroccan football league season

Botola Pro
- Season: 2011–12
- Champions: MA Tétouan (1st title)
- Relegated: IZ Khemisset; JS Massira
- Champions League: MA Tétouan; FUS Rabat
- Confederation Cup: Wydad AC; FAR Rabat (cup runner-up)
- Matches: 240
- Goals: 526 (2.19 per match)
- Top goalscorer: Karl Max Barthelemy (17 goals)
- Biggest home win: CR Al-Hoceima 5–0 HUS Agadir (25 September 2011)
- Biggest away win: 3 goals (5 times)
- Highest scoring: Raja CA 5–2 Kenitra AC

The 2011–12 Botola Pro is the 55th season of the Moroccan Top League, but the 1st under its new format of Moroccan Pro League. It began on Friday 19 August 2011 with MAS Fes beating HUS Agadir 2–0. Raja CA are the holders of the title. MA Tétouan won the 2011–12 Botola Pro, after defeating the runner-up FUS Rabat in the last game of the season at Stade Moulay Abdellah, Rabat. Both teams were pushing for the title until the last game. It was the first time in history of the Botola Pro that a team from the north of the country wins it.

== Overview ==
=== Stadiums and locations ===
Team	Location	Stadium	Capacity	Previous Season
JS Massira	Laayoune	Stade Cheikh Laaghdef	25,000	
CR Al-Hoceima	Al Hoceima	Stade Mimoun Al Arsi	12,000	
COD Meknes	Meknès	Stade d'Honneur	20,000	2010–2011 Botola 2 Champions (Promoted)
Difaa El Jadida	El Jadida	Stade El Abdi	6,000	
AS FAR	Rabat	Stade Moulay Abdellah	52,000	
FUS Rabat	Rabat	Stade Moulay Abdellah	52,000	
HUS Agadir	Agadir	Stade Al Inbiaâte	5,000	
IZ Khemisset	Khemisset	Stade du 18 novembre	10,000	2010–2011 Botola 2 Runners-Up (Promoted)
Kenitra AC	Kenitra	Stade Municipal de Kénitra	15,000	
MAS Fez	Fez	Fez Stadium	45,000	2010–2011 Botola Runners-Up
MA Tétouan	Tétouan	Stade Saniat Rmel	11,000	
OC Safi	Safi	Stade El Massira	7,000	
OC Khouribga	Khouribga	Stade OCP	5,000	
Raja CA	Casablanca	Stade Mohamed V	67,000	2010–2011 Botola Champions
Wydad Fes	Fez	Fez Stadium	45,000	
Wydad AC	Casablanca	Stade Mohamed V	67,000	

Source: Soccerway.com

== League table ==
Pos	Team	Pld	W	D	L	GF	GA	GD	Pts	Qualification or relegation
1	MA Tétouan (C)	30	17	10	3	41	13	+28	61	Qualification for 2013 CAF Champions League
2	FUS Rabat	30	16	9	5	32	16	+16	57	Qualification for 2013 CAF Champions League
3	Wydad AC	30	13	12	5	32	18	+14	51	Qualification for 2013 CAF Confederation Cup (Note: AS FAR qualified for the 2013 CAF Confederation Cup as the 2012 Moroccan Throne Cup runner-up since winners Raja CA participated in the 2012–13 UAFA Club Cup.)
4	Raja CA	30	14	9	7	34	24	+10	51	participation in the UAFA Club Cup
5	Difaa El Jadida	30	13	9	8	35	27	+8	48	
6	MAS Fes	30	10	11	9	35	26	+9	41	
7	AS FAR	30	10	11	9	32	29	+3	41	Qualification for 2013 CAF Confederation Cup
8	OC Safi	30	9	9	12	34	43	−9	36	
9	CR Al-Hoceima	30	8	9	13	31	27	+4	35 (Note: CRA 2 points added.)	
10	OC Khouribga	30	8	11	11	27	32	−5	35	
11	COD Meknes	30	10	6	14	19	26	−7	35 (Note: MEK 1 point deducted.)	
12	Kenitra AC	30	7	14	9	29	40	−11	35	
13	HUS Agadir	30	8	11	11	22	31	−9	33 (Note: HUSA 2 points deducted.)	
14	Widad Fez	30	7	9	14	26	39	−13	30	
15	JS Massira (R)	30	7	7	16	24	42	−18	28	Relegation to Botola Pro 2
16	IZ Khemisset (R)	30	5	9	16	12	32	−20	24	Relegation to Botola Pro 2

Updated to match(es) played on 27 May 2012. Source: goalzz.com
Rules for classification: 1) points; 2) goal difference; 3) number of goals scored.
(C) Champions; (R) Relegated

== Season statistics ==
=== Top scorers ===
As of 27 May 2012.

Rank	Player	Club	Goals
1	(Chad) Karl Max Barthélémy	Difaa El Jadida	17
2	(Morocco) Aziz Jounaid	AS FAR	15
2	(Morocco) Abderrazak Hamdallah	OC Safi	15
4	(Morocco) Hamza Abourazzouk	MAS Fes	11
5	(Morocco) Badr Kachani	FUS Rabat	10
6	(Morocco) Zakaria Hadraf	Difaa El Jadida	8
6	(Morocco) Abdeladim Khadrouf	MA Tétouan	8
6	(Morocco) Yassine Salhi	Raja CA	8
6	(Morocco) Abdessamad El Mobarky	CR Al-Hoceima	8
10	(Morocco) Brahim El Bahri	FUS Rabat	7
10	(Morocco) Abdelkarim Benhania	MA Tétouan	7
10	(Morocco) Zaid Krouch	MA Tétouan	7
10	(Morocco) Abderrazak El Mnasfi	MA Tétouan	7
10	(Cameroon) Arnaud Nsemen	CR Al-Hoceima	7
10	(Morocco) Bilal Biat	Kenitra AC	7

== See also ==
- 2011–12 Botola Pro 2
