= Botola Pro =

Moroccan association football league

- Organising body: Royal Moroccan Football Federation; Ligue Nationale de Football Professionnel
- Founded: 1915; 111 years ago (under the rule of the USFSA); 1922; 104 years ago (under the rule of the LMFA); 1956; 70 years ago (under the rule of the FRMF)
- Country: Morocco
- Confederation: CAF
- Number of clubs: 16 (since 1988)
- Level on pyramid: 1
- Relegation to: Botola Pro 2
- Domestic cup(s): Throne Cup; Excellence Cup
- International cup(s): CAF Champions League; CAF Confederation Cup
- Current champions: MAS Fez (5th title) (2025–26)
- Most championships: Wydad AC (22 titles)
- Most appearances: Abdelmajid Dolmy (760)
- Top scorer: Ahmed Faras (125)
- Broadcaster: SNRT (Arryadia)
- Website: frmf.ma
- Current: 2026–27 Botola Pro

Botola Pro, (Note: Arabic: البطولة الوطنية الإحترافية, romanized: al-Buṭūla al-Waṭaniyya al-Iḥtirāfiyya, lit. 'Professional National Championship') officially known as Botola Pro Inwi for sponsorship reasons, is a professional association football league in Morocco and the top tier of the Moroccan football league system. Organized by the Ligue Nationale de Football Professionnel (LNFP), under the authority of the Royal Moroccan Football Federation (FRMF), the league features 16 clubs and operates on a system of promotion and relegation with Botola Pro 2.

The Botola Pro season runs from August to May, with each of the 16 teams playing 30 matches (facing every other team twice, once at home and once away), totaling 240 matches per season. Most games are scheduled for Saturday and Sunday afternoons, while others are played on weekday evenings. The league is currently sponsored by Inwi. From 2015 to 2019, it was known as Botola Maroc Telecom due to its previous sponsorship agreement with Maroc Telecom.

The LNFP was officially established in 2015 by the FRMF to oversee the organization and development of professional football in Morocco, including the Botola Pro. This reform aimed to enhance the management of the domestic league and take advantage of growing commercial and broadcasting opportunities. Moroccan sports channel Arryadia holds the rights to broadcast Botola Pro matches, contributing to the league's media presence and revenue generation.

The Moroccan top-flight league has produced the second-highest number of CAF Champions League titles, with three Moroccan clubs having won seven African trophies in total. It has also produced the highest number of CAF Confederation Cup titles, with five Moroccan clubs having won seven African confederation trophies.

The current champions are MAS Fez, who won their 5th titles in the 2025–26 season.

== History ==
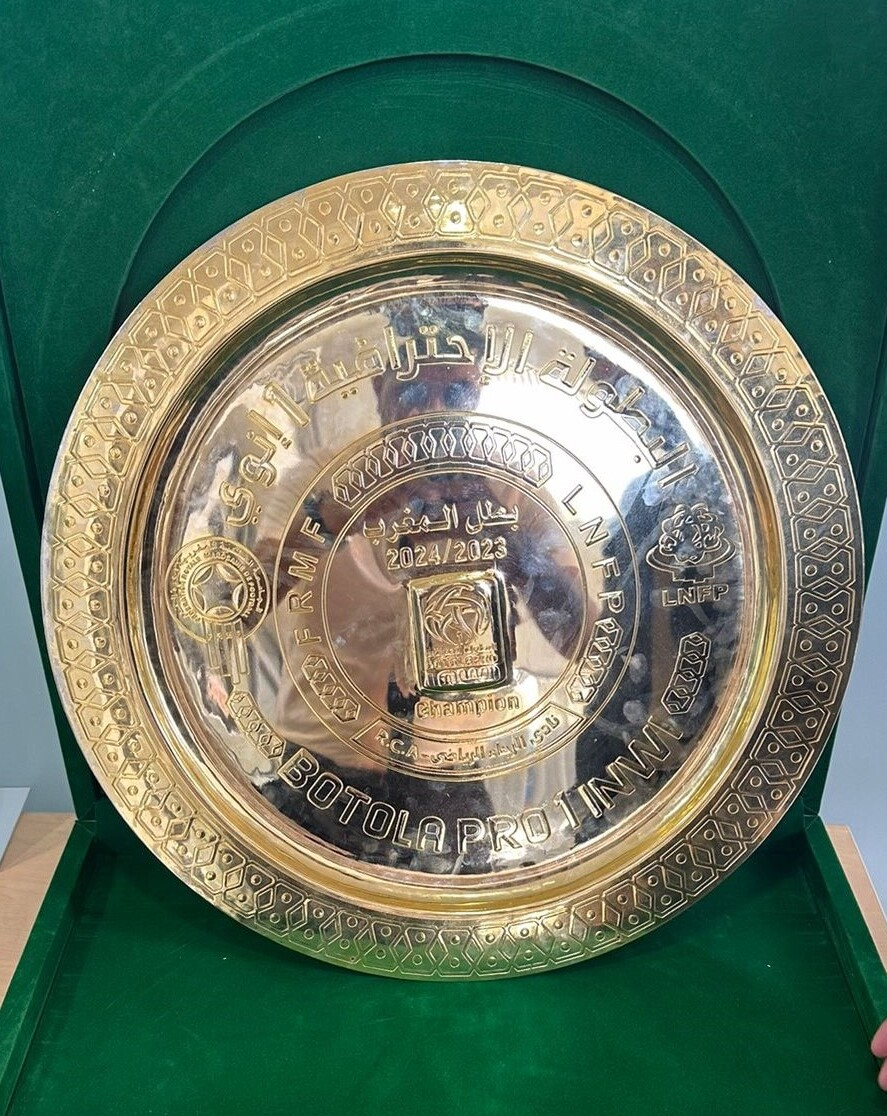
Botola Pro Trophy

The Moroccan Football Championship was launched in the Sultanate on 11 June 1915. Organised by the Moroccan football league. The new organisation under the Royal Moroccan Football Federation took place in January 1957, Wydad AC was crowned as the 1956–57 season champion, for its sixth title. In the following season, the KAC Marrakech club was crowned, and then the following two seasons were crowned by the youth star and Kénitra AC.

=== The start of the great rivalry (1960–1970) ===
AS FAR dominated the championship for four consecutive seasons despite the competition being played by strong teams, namely MAS Fes and KAC Marrakech, where the Askari Club was able to enter history as the first club to achieve four consecutive titles in the years (1961–1964). Then in the 1964–1965 season, MAS Fes won its first title, then Wydad AC won the league title in the 1965–1966 season, which is the beginning of the competition between Raja CA and Wydad AC in the tournament, where the derby was repeated due to the public entering the stadium which ended with Raja winning 2–1; But when it was replayed, it ended in a 0–0 draw, and thus Wydad AC won the championship by one point over Raja CA.

=== New champions (1971–1995) ===
New teams were able to crown the championship title during this period, including RS Settat, RAC Casablanca, Raja Beni Mellal, MC Oujda, SCC Mohammédia, and others that had previously been crowned as Wydad, who won the league for three consecutive seasons. Kenitra was able to obtain the championship in the 1973–1972 season in a dramatic way in a season known as the famous case of the Car Dial Fez, where it noticed the survival of Wydad from going down to the second national division due to the cancellation of the interview of MAS Fes with Wydad AC in the last round due to a malfunction in the bus that was carrying the players of Maghreb Fez, which automated a loss for fez and Wydad got 4 points, Kénitra AC won the league.

MAS Fes was able to add two more titles to its treasury at this stage. Kénitra AC managed to win two successive titles, while CO Casablanca won their first title, and the competition was strong between Wydad AC and the AS FAR, where the Military Club won three titles, bringing the total of its titles to 10 to hang its first star, and then Wydad was able to win four titles, bringing its total titles to 15. While the KAC Marrakech club was satisfied with its second title only, while another new competitor appeared, Raja CA, which won its first title in the 1987–1988 season.

=== Raja's glory (1995–2002) ===
In the seven seasons between 1995 and 2002, Raja CA arose quickly making it one of the most supported club in Morocco, as it managed to obtain the championship for six consecutive seasons in a golden period during which a generation of excellent players appeared. This period coincided with the emergence of Raja CA on the scene International in the African Champions League and Club World Cup. Appearing in 3 CAF Champions League Final winning 2 but losing the 2002 CAF Champions League Final and ending 7th in the 2000 FIFA Club World Championship.

=== New champions (2002–2011) ===
HUS Agadir managed to win the championship twice in a row, despite the competition from the two poles of the economic capital. After that, the tournament became more exciting between the two poles of Casablanca, Wydad AC and AS FAR as the tournament was not decided until the last two rounds or the last round. FAR and Wydad Casablanca won two titles, while OC Khouribga won its first title in its history. While Raja CA continued the race to try to catch up with Wydad and the Army, as it won three titles, bringing its total to ten titles, to be the third team to suspend the ten titles. Botola was placed third as the best African league of the world of the first decade (2001-2010) by IFFHS.

=== The start of Botola Pro (2011–present) ===
In light of the league's strength, it was necessary for the Moroccan League to move Moroccan football from the abyss to professionalism, so the first professional season was 2011–12 which was crowned by the MA Tétouan club for the first time in its history. Raja CA managed to win the title in the 2012–13 season, then followed by MA Tétouan in the 2013–14 Botola Pro. In the 2014–15 season, Wydad AC returned after 5 years again to win the 18th title in its history. FUS Rabat also won the 2015–16 season title for the first time in its history, while Wydad AC won the 2016–17 Botola League title for the 19th time in its history. In 2017–18, IR Tanger managed to win their 1st league title in its history. On 4 October 2020, the FRMF introduced the Virtual Offside Line in Botola. Botola has been ranked in the top 40 world's strongest national league of the decade by International Federation of Football History & Statistics. On 25 May 2021, Botola was placed third as the best African league of the world of the second decade (2011-2020) by IFFHS. On 27 December 2022, The President of the National League stated that the winter transfer market will depend on the financial status of the clubs and to resolve all standing disputes related to player contracts, as well as the technical and medical staff of the clubs. Since 2018, Botola has been ranked top 3 strongest African leagues by IFFHS.

== Competition format ==
There are 16 clubs in the Botola Pro. During the course of a season (from August to May) each club plays the others twice (a double round-robin system), once at their home stadium and once at that of their opponents', for 30 games. Teams receive three points for a win and one point for a draw. No points are awarded for a loss. Teams are ranked by total points, then goal difference, and then goals scored. If still equal, teams are deemed to occupy the same position. If there is a tie for the championship, for relegation, or for qualification to other competitions, a play-off match at a neutral venue decides rank.

Champion and runner-up participate in the African Champions League. The third-place team and Coupe du Trône winner qualify to participate in the African Confederation Cup.

=== Promotion and relegation ===
A system of promotion and relegation exists between the Botola Pro and the Botola Pro 2. The two lowest placed teams in the Botola Pro are relegated to the Botola Pro 2, and the top two teams from the Botola Pro 2 promoted to the Botola Pro.

Number of clubs in Botola Pro throughout the years
Period (in years)	No. of clubs
1915–37	8 clubs
1937–39	10 clubs
1939–41	27 clubs (4 groups) + playoffs
1941–42	10 clubs
1942–45	27 clubs (4 groups) + playoffs
1945–46	27 clubs (2 groups) + playoffs
1946–56	14 clubs
1956–58	16 clubs
1958–66	14 clubs
1966–67	16 clubs
1967–68	18 clubs
1968–80	16 clubs
1980–81	20 clubs
1981–82	18 clubs
1982–85	16 clubs
1985–86	20 clubs
1986–87	24 clubs (2 groups) + playoffs
1987–88	18 clubs
1988–2024	16 clubs
2024–present	16 clubs + relegations playoffs

== Sponsorship ==
Since 2020, inwi has been the official sponsor of the Botola for a 15 million dirham per year contract.

Period	Sponsor	Brand
2011–2015	No sponsor	Botola Pro
2015–2019	Maroc Telecom	Botola Maroc Telecom
2019–2020	No sponsor	Botola Pro 1
2020–present	Inwi	Botola Pro 1 Inwi

== Broadcasting rights ==
In September 2007, the SNRT Group (Al Aoula, 2M TV and Arryadia) paid 225 million dirhams for the rights to broadcast the following three seasons of the Botola.

Throughout the week, every game played in the Botola is broadcast live by at least one TV channel.

== Botola clubs in Africa ==
The Botola is currently second in the CAF 5-year ranking of African leagues, after being first for the past three years. This ranking is based on the performances of domestic clubs in African competitions over a five-year period.

Raja CA and Wydad AC have been in the top ten most successful clubs in African football in terms of total African trophies. These two clubs, along with AS FAR and MAS Fes, are four of the most successful teams in African competition history. HUS Agadir, OC Khouribga, DH El-jadida and FUS Rabat are the joint fourth-most participating Moroccan team in the Champions League with MAS Fes — after Raja CA, Wydad AC and AS FAR. AS FAR is the first Moroccan club to win an international cup after defeating AS Bilima in the 1985 African Cup of Champions Clubs Finals.

Moroccan Clubs are the most titled in the CAF Confederation Cup with 8 titles and the second most titled Clubs in the CAF Champions League and CAF Super Cup. AS FAR became the first Moroccan club to play back-to-back finals in the African Confederation Cup winning the 2005 Confederation Cup and losing the 2006 Confederation Cup.

Club	CAF Champions League	CAF Confederation Cup	CAF Super Cup	African Cup Winners' Cup (defunct)	CAF Cup (defunct)	Afro-Asian Club Championship (defunct)	Clubs Titles
Raja CA	3 (1989, 1997, 1999)	2 (2018, 2021)	2 (2000, 2019)	—	1 (2003)	1 (1998)	9
Wydad AC	3 (1992, 2017, 2022)	—	1 (2018)	1 (2002)	—	1 (1993)	6
RS Berkane	—	3 (2020, 2022, 2025)	1 (2022)	—	—	—	4
FAR Rabat	1 (1985)	1 (2005)	—	—	—	—	2
MAS Fez	—	1 (2011)	1 (2012)		—	—	2
Kawkab Marrakech	—	—	—	—	1 (1996)	—	1
FUS Rabat	—	1 (2010)	—	—	—	—	1
Total	7	8	5	1	2	2	25

=== Qualification for African competitions ===
==== Association ranking for the 2026–27 CAF club season ====
The association ranking for the 2026–27 CAF Champions League and the 2026–27 CAF Confederation Cup will be based on results from each CAF club competition from 2021–22 to the 2025–26 season with the 2025–26 season currently underway.

Legend

- CL: CAF Champions League
- CC: CAF Confederation Cup
- **Associations in bold** are still active in 2025–26 CAF club competitions
Associations ranked 1–12 are eligible to enter two teams in each CAF club competition.

Rank			Association	2021–22 (× 1)		2022–23 (× 2)		2023–24 (× 3)		2024–25 (× 4)		2025–26 (× 5)		Total
2026	2025	Mvt	Association	CL	CC	CL	CC	CL	CC	CL	CC	CL	CC	Total
1	1	—	Egypt	7	4	8	2.5	7	7	10	4	6	6	190
2	2	—	Morocco	9	5	8	2	2	4	5	5	9	5	162
3	4	+1	Algeria	7	1	6	5	2	3	5	5	3	8	140
4	3	-1	South Africa	5	4	4	3	4	1.5	9	3	6	2	127.5
5	5	—	Tanzania	0	2	3	4	6	0	2	4	3	1.5	80.5
6	6	—	Tunisia	5	1	4	2	6	1	3	0.5	4	0	73

==== Historical rankings since 2011 ====
Legend

- Associations ranked 1–12 and eligible to enter two teams in each CAF club competition.
- — No rank (0 Points)

Association	Rank (points)																
Association	2011	2012	2013	2014	2015	2016	2017	2018	2018–19	2019–20	2020–21	2021–22	2022–23	2023–24	2024–25	2025-26	2026-27
Morocco	8 (20)	7 (27)	4 (62)	5 (53)	4 (44)	7 (29)	7 (24)	6 (41)	4 (84)	2 (153)	1 (190)	1 (183)	1 (194)	1 (180)	2 (148)	2 (142)	2 (162)

== Club ranking for the 2026–27 CAF club season ==
The club ranking is used for seeding in the CAF Champions League and the CAF Confederation Cup.Pending equality in ranking points, the team receiving more points in the most recent season is considered as the higher-ranked team.

The club ranking for the 2026–27 CAF Champions League and the 2026–27 CAF Confederation Cup is to be based on results from each CAF club competition from the 2021–22 to the 2025–26 seasons.

Legend

Club is still active in 2025-26 CAF Champions League
Club is still active in 2025-26 CAF Confederation Cup

Rank	Club	2021–22 (× 1)	2022–23 (× 2)	2023–24 (× 3)	2024–25 (× 4)	2025–26 (× 5)	Total
1	(South Africa) Mamelodi Sundowns	3	4	4	5	6	73
2	(Egypt) Al Ahly	5	6	6	4	3	66
3	(Tunisia) Espérance de Tunis	3	4	5	3	4	58
4	(Morocco) RS Berkane	5	0	4	5	4	57
5	(Algeria) USM Alger	0	5	3	2	5	52

8	(Morocco) ASFAR Rabat	0	2	0	3	5	41

13	(Morocco) Wydad AC	6	5	2	0	2	32

21	(Morocco) Raja CA	3	3	0	2	0	17
22	(Morocco) Olympic Safi	0	0	0	0	3	15

== Clubs ==
=== 2026-2027 season ===
Club	City	Stadium	Capacity
COD Meknès	Meknes	Honneur Stadium	12,000
DH El-Jadida	El Jadida	Ben M'Hamed El Abdi Stadium	10,000
AS FAR	Rabat	Prince Moulay Abdellah Stadium	69,500
FUS Rabat	Rabat	Moulay El Hassan Stadium	22,000
HUS Agadir	Agadir	Adrar Stadium	45,480
IR Tangier	Tangier	Tangier Grand Stadium	75,000
MAS	Fez	Fez Stadium	45,000
MA Tétouan	Tétouan	Saniat Rmel Stadium	7,000
Raja CA	Casablanca	Mohammed V Stadium	45,000
RCA Zemamra	Zemamra	Ahmed Choukri Stadium	3,000
RS Berkane	Berkane	Berkane Municipal Stadium	10,000
KAC Marrakech	Marrakesh	Marrakesh Stadium	45,000
US Amal Tiznit	Tiznit	El Bachir Stadium (Mohammedia)	10,000
UTS Rabat	Rabat	Al Medina Stadium	18,000
WS Témara	Temara	Rabat Olympic Stadium (Rabat)	21,000
Wydad AC	Casablanca	Mohammed V Stadium	45,000

=== Stadium and locations ===
Locations of the 2026–27 Botola teams

== Stadiums ==
=== Current stadiums ===
Tanger	Rabat	Casablanca	Agadir	Marrakesh
Ibn Batouta Stadium	Prince Moulay Abdellah Stadium	Stade Mohammed V	Adrar Stadium	Marrakesh Stadium
Capacity: 75,000	Capacity: 68,000	Capacity: 45,000	Capacity: 45,480	Capacity: 45,240
Fes	Rabat	Rabat	Rabat	Mohammedia
Fez Stadium	Moulay Hassan Stadium	Rabat Olympic Stadium	Al Medina Stadium	El Bachir Stadium
Capacity: 45,000	Capacity: 22,000	Capacity: 21,000	Capacity: 18,000	Capacity: 15,000
Berkane	Meknes	El Jadida	Tétouan	Zemamra
Berkane Municipal Stadium	Honneur Stadium	Ben M'Hamed El Abdi Stadium	Saniat Rmel Stadium	Ahmed Choukri Stadium
Capacity: 15,000	Capacity: 12,000	Capacity: 10,000	Capacity: 7,000	Capacity: 2,500

=== Other stadiums ===
Safi	Marrakesh	Khemisset	Kenitra	Khouribga
El Massira Stadium	El Harti Stadium	18 November Stadium	Municipal Stadium	Phosphate Stadium
Capacity: 8,000	Capacity: 10,000	Capacity: 5,000	Capacity: 28,000	Capacity: 10,000
Berrechid
Municipal Stadium
Capacity: 5,000

== List of champions ==
=== Performance by club ===
Rank	Club	Winners	Seasons
1	Wydad AC	22	1947–48, 1948–49, 1949–50, 1950–51, 1954–55, 1956–57, 1965–66, 1968–69, 1975–76, 1976–77, 1977–78, 1985–86, 1989–90, 1990–91, 1992–93, 2005–06, 2009–10, 2014–15, 2016–17, 2018–19, 2020–21, 2021–22
2	Raja CA	13	1987–88, 1995–96, 1996–97, 1997–98, 1998–99, 1999–00, 2000–01, 2003–04, 2008–09, 2010–11, 2012–13, 2019–20, 2023–24
3	AS FAR	13	1960–61, 1961–62, 1962–63, 1963–64, 1966–67, 1967–68, 1969–70, 1983–84, 1986–87, 1988–89, 2004–05, 2007–08, 2022–23
4	MAS Fes	5	1964–65, 1978–79, 1982–83, 1984–85, 2025–26
5	Kenitra AC	4	1959–60, 1972–73, 1980–81, 1981–82
6	RAC Casablanca	3	1944–45, 1953–54, 1971–72
6	Stade Marocain	3	1927–28, 1930–31, 1943–44
8	MA Tétouan	2	2011–12, 2013–14
8	HUS Agadir	2	2001–02, 2002–03
8	KAC Marrakech	2	1957–58, 1991–92
11	RS Berkane	1	2024–25
11	IR Tanger	1	2017–18
11	FUS Rabat	1	2015–16
11	OC Khouribga	1	2006–07
11	COD Meknès	1	1994–95
11	CO Casablanca	1	1993–94
11	SCC Mohammédia	1	1979–80
11	MC Oujda	1	1974–75
11	Raja Beni Mellal	1	1973–74
11	RS Settat	1	1970–71
11	EJS Casablanca	1	1958–59

=== By city ===
City	Championships	Clubs
Casablanca	40	Wydad AC (22), Raja CA (13), Racing Casablanca (3), Olympique Casablanca (1), Étoile de Casablanca (1)
Rabat	17	AS FAR (13), Stade Marocain (3), FUS Rabat (1)
Fez	5	MAS Fes (5)
Kenitra	4	Kénitra AC (4)
Marrakesh	2	KAC Marrakech (2)
Agadir	2	HUS Agadir (2)
Tétouan	2	MA Tétouan (2)
Khouribga	1	OC Khouribga (1)
Settat	1	RS Settat (1)
Tangier	1	IR Tanger (1)
Oujda	1	MC Oujda (1)
Meknes	1	COD Meknès (1)
Mohammedia	1	SCC Mohammédia (1)
Beni Mellal	1	Raja Beni Mellal (1)
Berkane	1	RS Berkane (1)

=== By region ===
Region	Championships	Clubs
Casablanca-Settat	42	Wydad AC (22), Raja CA (13), Racing Casablanca (3), Olympique Casablanca (1), Étoile de Casablanca (1), RS Settat (1), SCC Mohammédia (1)
Rabat-Salé-Kénitra	21	AS FAR (13), Kénitra AC (4), Stade Marocain (3), FUS Rabat (1)
Fez-Meknes	6	MAS Fes (5), COD Meknès (1)
Tangier-Tetouan-Al Hoceima	3	MA Tétouan (2), IR Tanger (1)
Marrakesh-Safi	2	KAC Marrakech (2)
Souss-Massa	2	HUS Agadir (2)
Béni Mellal-Khénifra	2	OC Khouribga (1), Raja Beni Mellal (1)
Oriental	2	MC Oujda (1), RS Berkane (1)

== Performance comparison since 2011 ==
Performance comparison of top teams since 2011.

Teams	11–12	12–13	13–14	14–15	15–16	16–17	17–18	18–19	19–20	20–21	21–22	22–23	23–24	24–25	25–26
WAC	3	4	6	1	2	1 (Note: Participated also in the Arab Cup.)	2	1	2	1	1	2	5	3	5
RCA	4	1	2	8	5	3	6	2	1	2	2	5	1	5	3
ASFAR	7	2	7	11	4	6	8	14	6	3	3	1	2	2	4
MAT	1	5	1	4	6	12	11	13	7	16	-	13	9	15	-
FUS	2	6	3	5	1	7	4	9	4	10	5	3	7	4	8
IRT	-	-	-	-	3	5	1	5	14	8	13	14	12	10	7
DHJ	5	9	5	7	13	2	5	8	11	11	8	16	-	9	6
OCK	10	13	14	2	12	11	12	11	15	-	10	15	-	-	-
RSB	-	7	9	9	7	4	9	7	3	4	6	6	3	1	2
HUSA	12	10	8	6	8	8	3	3	8	6	12	7	10	13	12
MAS	6	3	14	10	16 (Note: Despite relegation, MAS qualified for the Confederation Cup as Throne Cup winners.)	-	-	-	-	7	4	10	11	7	1
KACM	-	-	4	3	14	13	14	15	-	-	-	-	-	-	10
OCS	8	12	11	12	9	9	7	4	13	11	7	4	6	8	16
League champions Champions League; Confederation Cup; Arab Cup; Relegation

== All-time Botola Pro table (since 2011) ==
The all-time Botola Pro table is an overall record of all match results, points, and goals of every team that has played in Botola Pro since its new format inception in 2011.

All-time Botola Pro table (2011–)
Pos	Team	S	Pts	GP	W	D	L	GF	GA	GD	1st	2nd	3rd	4th	5th	T	Debut	Since/ Last App	Best
1	Wydad AC	15	829	450	232	133	85	647	375	+272	5	4	2	1	2	14	2011–12	2011–12	1
2	Raja CA	15	816	450	225	141	84	650	368	+282	3	4	2	1	3	13	2011–12	2011–12	1
3	AS FAR	15	737	450	195	152	103	606	421	+185	1	3	2	2	–	8	2011–12	2011–12	1
4	FUS Rabat	15	689	450	179	152	119	514	399	+115	1	1	2	3	2	9	2011–12	2011–12	1
5	RS Berkane	14	651	420	165	156	99	476	365	+111	1	1	2	2	–	5	2012–13	2012–13	1
6	HUS Agadir	15	565 (Note: HUSA deducted 2 points due to the involvement of 4 foreign players against CRA in 2011/12 Season)	450	140	145	165	476	517	−41	–	–	2	–	–	2	2011–12	2011–12	3
7	DH Jadida	14	562	420	138	148	134	448	448	0	–	1	–	–	3	4	2011–12	2024–25	2
8	OC Safi	15	562	450	133	163	154	443	512	−69	–	–	–	2	–	2	2011–12	2025–26	4
9	MA Tétouan	13	517	390	128	133	129	416	421	−5	2	–	–	1	1	4	2011–12	2026–27	1
10	MAS Fès	11	439	330	100	139	91	349	319	+30	1	–	1	1	–	3	2011–12	2020–21	1
11	IR Tanger	11	426	330	107	105	118	323	359	−36	1	–	1	–	2	4	2015–16	2015–16	1
12	OC Khouribga	11	383 (Note: OCK deducted 2 points because of two matches being awarded against them in 2013/14 season)	330	93	110	127	325	387	−62	–	1	–	–	–	1	2011–12	2022–23	2
13	CR Al Hoceima	8	265 (Note: 2 points were added to CRA in 2011/12 season because of HUSA's inclusion of 4 foreign players against them. And in 2013/14 season 1 point deducted because of one match being awarded against them)	240	64	72	104	216	294	−78	–	–	–	–	–	–	2011–12	2018–19	8
14	KAC Marrakech	7	256	210	63	67	80	210	230	−20	–	–	1	1	–	2	2013–14	2025–26	3
15	MC Oujda	7	244	210	59	67	84	215	261	−46	–	–	–	–	2	2	2015–16	2023–24	5
16	Kenitra AC	6	185	180	41	62	77	151	222	−71	–	–	–	–	–	–	2011–12	2016–17	11
17	RCA Zemamra	5	184	150	48	40	62	168	182	−14	–	–	–	–	–	–	2019–20	2020–21	8
18	RC Oued Zem	5	172	150	40	52	58	132	167	−35	–	–	–	–	–	–	2017–18	2021–22	9
19	CAY Berrechid	5	154	150	36	46	68	138	206	−68	–	–	–	–	–	–	2018–19	2023–24	6
20	UTS Rabat	4	146	120	35	41	44	131	147	−16	–	–	–	1	–	1	2022–23	2022–23	4
21	COD Meknès	4	133 (Note: CODM deducted 1 point after the masses rioted in front of MAS 2011/12 season)	120	33	34	53	94	143	−49	–	–	–	–	–	–	2011–12	2024–25	10
22	SCC Mohammédia	5	129	150	29	42	79	112	204	−92	–	–	–	–	–	–	2020–21	2024–25	9
23	JS Soualem	4	124 (Note: JSS deducted 3 points Because his coach Mohamed El Sebki was on the bench of his club without being legally qualified, in the match he won against US Touarga 1–0 in the 2023/24 season)	120	32	31	57	120	166	−46	–	–	–	–	–	–	2021–22	2024–25	9
24	CA Khénifra	3	95	90	21	32	37	79	103	−24	–	–	–	–	–	–	2014–15	2017–18	10
25	WA Fes	3	89	90	19	32	39	74	113	−39	–	–	–	–	–	–	2011–12	2013–14	11
26	IZ Khemisset	2	51	60	10	21	29	38	72	−34	–	–	–	–	–	–	2011–12	2014–15	16
27	Raja Beni Mellal	2	36	60	5	21	34	35	84	−49	–	–	–	–	–	–	2012–13	2019–20	16
28	US Yacoub Mansour	1	30	30	7	9	14	34	44	−10	–	–	–	–	–	–	2025–26	2025–26	15
29	Olympique Dcheira	1	30	30	7	9	14	29	40	−11	–	–	–	–	–	–	2025–26	2025–26	14
30	AS Sale	1	29	30	6	11	13	25	33	−8	–	–	–	–	–	–	2013–14	2013–14	15
31	JS Massira	1	28	30	7	7	16	24	42	−18	–	–	–	–	–	–	2011–12	2011–12	15
32	JS Kasba Tadla	1	28	30	7	7	16	25	47	−22	–	–	–	–	–	–	2016–17	2016–17	15
33	RAC Casablanca	1	17	30	3	8	19	23	54	−32	–	–	–	–	–	–	2017–18	2017–18	16
34	US Amal Tiznit	1	–	30	–	–	–	–	–	–	–	–	–	–	–	–	2026–27	2026–27	–
34	WS Temara	1	–	30	–	–	–	–	–	–	–	–	–	–	–	–	2026–27	2026–27	–

League or status for 2026–27 season
Botola Pro
Botola Pro 2
Amateur National
Amateurs I
Amateurs II
Regional Leagues
Club no longer exists

== Player records ==
=== Most goals (since 2011) ===
The table shows the Botola Pro top scorers since its new format inception in 2011. The table is accurate as of the end of the 2025–26 season.

Boldface indicates a player still active in Botola Pro1. Italics indicates a player still active outside Botola Pro1.

Rank	Player	Club(s)	Years active	Goals
1	(Morocco) Mouhcine Iajour	Wydad AC (5), Raja CA (53), MA Tétouan (12), RS Berkane (9)	2011–2015, 2017–2019, 2020–21	79
2	(Morocco) Zakaria Hadraf	DH Jadidi (52), Raja CA (10), RS Berkane (5), RCA Zemamra (5)	2011–2019, 2020–2024	72
3	(Morocco) Mehdi Naghmi	AS FAR (41), IR Tanger (22), MC Oujda (3)	2011–2020, 2022	66
4	(Morocco) **Abdelilah Hafidi**	Raja CA (50)	2011–2021, 2023–2024, 2026–	50
4	(Morocco) **Brahim El Bahraoui**	OC Safi (13), Fath US (7), RC Oued Zem (16), RS Berkane (14)	2011–	50
4	(Morocco) **Youssef El Fahli**	HUS Agadir (14), RS Berkane (16), **AS FAR** (20)	2017–	50
7	(Ivory Coast) **Lamine Diakite**	DH Jadidi (4), **Fath US** (11), MC Oujda (21), AS FAR (13)	2014–	49
7	(Morocco) **Adam Ennaffati**	Fath US (7), OC Khouribga (5), MC Oujda (7), AS FAR (6), **Raja CA** (24),	2014–2021, 2022–	49
9	(Morocco) Abdessamad El Mobarky	CR Al Hoceima (35), RS Berkane (1), RCA Zemamra (12)	2011–2021	48
10	(Morocco) Reda Hajhouj	Wydad AC (15), OC Khouribga (21), Fath US (11)	2014–2017, 2017–2018, 2020–2022, 2024–2025	47
10	(Morocco) **Oussama Lamlioui**	SCC Mohammédia (22), **RS Berkane** (25)	2020–	47
10	(Morocco) **Hamid Ahaddad**	DH Jadidi (17), Raja CA (16), Fath US (9), MAS Fes (4), **HUS Agadir** (1)	2015–2018, 2019–2020, 2021–2025, 2026–	47

The historical top scorer of the competition is Ahmed Faras with 127 goals.

== See also ==
- Sport in Morocco
- Moroccan Football League (LMFA) (1922–1956)
