= 2014–15 Botola Pro =

Moroccan football league season

Botola
- Season: 2014–15
- Champions: Wydad Casablanca
- Relegated: Chabab Atlas Khénifra; Ittihad Khemisset
- Champions League: Wydad Casablanca; Olympique Khouribga
- Confederation Cup: Kawkab Marrakech; FUS Rabat
- Matches: 240
- Goals: 493 (2.05 per match)
- Top goalscorer: Malick Evouna (16 goals)
- Biggest home win: KACM 4–0 HUSA; DHJ 4–0 MAS; FUS 4–0 OCS; WAC 4-0 KACM; FAR 4-0 CRA
- Biggest away win: CRA 0–4 FAR
- Highest scoring: HUSA 5–3 RCA

The 2014–15 Botola was the 58th season of the Moroccan Top League and the 4th under its new format of Moroccan Pro League.

== Teams locations ==
Locations of the 2014–15 Botola teams

Team	Home city	Stadium	Capacity
Chabab Atlas Khénifra	Khenifra	Stade Municipal	5,000
Chabab Rif Al Hoceima	Al Hoceima	Stade Mimoun Al Arsi	12,000
Difaâ El Jadidi	El Jadida	Stade El Abdi	10,000
AS FAR Club	Rabat	Stade Moulay Abdellah	65,000
Fath Union Sport	Rabat	Stade de FUS	15,000
Hassania Agadir	Agadir	Stade Adrar	45,480
Ittihad Khemisset	Khemisset	Stade du 18 novembre	10,000
KAC Kénitra	Kenitra	Stade Municipal (Kenitra)	15,000
Kawkab Marrakech	Marrakesh	Marrakesh Stadium	45,240
MAS Fez	Fez	Fez Stadium	45,000
Moghreb Tétouan	Tétouan	Saniat Rmel	15,000
Olympic Safi	Safi, Morocco	Stade El Massira	10,000
Olympique Khouribga	Khouribga	Complexe OCP	10,000
Raja Casablanca	Casablanca	Stade Mohamed V	67,000
RSB Berkane	Berkane	Stade Municipal	15,000
Wydad Casablanca	Casablanca	Stade Mohamed V	67,000

== League table ==
Pos	Team	Pld	W	D	L	GF	GA	GD	Pts	Qualification or relegation
1	Wydad Casablanca (C)	30	16	11	3	48	21	+27	59	Qualification for 2016 CAF Champions League
2	Olympique Khouribga	30	16	8	6	29	17	+12	56	Qualification for 2016 CAF Champions League
3	Kawkab Marrakech	30	13	8	9	31	26	+5	47	Qualification for 2016 CAF Confederation Cup (Note: FUS Rabat qualified for the CAF Confederation Cup as runners-up of the 2015 Moroccan Throne Cup to Olympique Khouribga, who have qualified for the 2016 CAF Champions League.)
4	Moghreb Tétouan	30	11	12	7	36	29	+7	45	
5	FUS Rabat	30	11	12	7	34	28	+6	45	Qualification for 2016 CAF Confederation Cup
6	Hassania Agadir	30	10	10	10	42	46	−4	40	
7	Difaâ El Jadidi	30	10	9	11	26	23	+3	39	
8	Raja Casablanca	30	9	11	10	37	34	+3	38	
9	RSB Berkane	30	6	18	6	25	24	+1	36	
10	Maghreb Fès	30	8	12	10	34	35	−1	36	
11	AS FAR Club	30	7	13	10	31	26	+5	34	
12	Olympic Safi	30	8	10	12	20	35	−15	34	
13	KAC Kénitra	30	8	9	13	25	29	−4	33	
14	Chabab Rif Hoceima	30	7	11	12	26	43	−17	32 (Note: Chabab Rif Hoceima ahead on head-to-head record: Chabab Atlas Khénifra 0-1 Chabab Rif Hoceima (week 11), Chabab Rif Hoceima 1-1 Chabab Atlas Khénifra (week 26))	
15	Chabab Atlas Khénifra (R)	30	8	8	14	23	37	−14	32	Relegation to Botola 2
16	Ittihad Khemisset (R)	30	5	12	13	26	40	−14	27	Relegation to Botola 2

Updated to match(es) played on 24 May 2015. Source: Botola Pro
Rules for classification: 1) points; 2) goal difference; 3) number of goals scored.
(C) Champions; (R) Relegated

== Season statistics ==
=== Top goalscorers ===
As of 24 May 2015.

Rank	Player	Club	Goals
1	(Gabon) Malick Evouna	Wydad AC	16
2	(Morocco) Mouhcine Iajour	Raja CA	12
3	(Morocco) Mehdi Naghmi	AS FAR	11
4	(Morocco) Abdelilah Hafidi	Raja CA	8
4	(Morocco) Mourad Batna	Fath US	8
6	(Mali) Yahya Coulibaly	IZ Khemisset	7
6	(Morocco) Ibrahim Bezghoudi	OC Khouribga	7
6	(Morocco) Zakaria Hadraf	DH Jadida	7
6	(Morocco) Abdelghani Mouaoui	OC Safi	7
10	(Morocco) Ayoub Nanah	DH Jadida	6
10	(Mali) Mamadou Sidibé	OC Khouribga	6
10	(Morocco) Reda Hajhouj	Wydad AC	6
10	(Ivory Coast) Bakare Kone	Wydad AC	6
10	(Morocco) Mohamed Ounajem	CA Khénifra	6
10	(Morocco) Ismail El Haddad	HUS Agadir	6
10	(Morocco) Abdelhafid Lirki	HUS Agadir	6
10	(Brazil) Luiz Jeferson Escher	KAC Marrakech	6
10	(Morocco) Ismail El Hadaoui	IZ Khemisset	6

== Annual awards ==
The Royal Moroccan Football Federation, in coordination with the LNFP ( Ligue Nationale du Football Professionnel) and the UMFP (Union Marocaine des Footballeurs Professionnels), organized the 1st edition of the "Stars' Night" in honor of the players and coaches who were distinguished during the 2014/2015 season.

Award	Winner	Club
Manager of the Season	(Wales) John Toshack	Wydad AC
Player of the Season	(Morocco) Mourad Batna / (Morocco) Mouhcine Iajour	Fath US / MA Tétouan
Goalkeeper of the Season	(Morocco) Mohammed Amine El Bourkadi	OC Khouribga
Foreign Player of the Season	(Ivory Coast) Bakare Kone	Wydad AC

== See also ==
- 2014–15 GNF 2
