= Viva Records =

Viva Records may refer to:

- Viva Records (U.S.), subsidiary of Snuff Garrett Records
- Viva Records (Philippines), a Philippine record label

== See also ==
- Viva (disambiguation)
