= Abdelkrim Jinani =

Moroccan football manager (born 1973)

Personal information
- Date of birth: 2 September 1973 (age 53)
- Place of birth: Casablanca, Morocco
- Height: 1.87 m (6 ft 2 in)
- Position: Forward

Team information
- Current team: Raja CA (manager)

Youth career
- –1992: Tihad AS

Senior career*
Years	Team	Apps	(Gls)
1992–1995	Tihad AS		
1995–1996	Tihad SC		
1996–1997	Raja CA	21	(12)
1997–1998	Stade Rennais	3	(0)
1998	→ Stade Lavallois (loan)	10	(1)
1998–1999	→ Shenzhen Pingan (loan)		
1999	SR Delémont	11	(3)
1999–2000	Yverdon-Sport		
2000–2001	Raja CA		
2001–2002	Al Mokawloon Al Arab		

International career
1990–1991	Morocco U20		
1995–1996	Morocco	1	(2)

Managerial career
- 2017–2018: Olympique Dcheira (assistant)
- 2018–2021: Olympique Dcheira
- 2021–2022: RC Oued Zem
- 2022–2023: Hassania Agadir (assistant)
- 2023: DH El Jadida
- 2024: Raja CA (assistant)
- 2024: Raja CA (interim)
- 2025: Al Dhahra SC
- 2026: Moghreb Tétouan
- 2026–: Raja CA
- * Club domestic league appearances and goals

Abdelkrim Jinani (Arabic: عبد الكريم الجناني, born 2 September 1973) is a Moroccan professional football manager and former player who played as a forward. He is the current manager of Raja CA.

Abdelkrim Jinani began his career at Tihad AS before joining Tihad SC in 1995, then moving to Raja CA in January 1997. In six months, he won the 1996–97 Botola and took part in Raja's victorious campaign in the 1997 Champions League. In 1997, he joined Stade Rennais, before playing for Stade Lavallois, Shenzhen Pingan and several Swiss clubs. In 2000, he returned to Raja for one final season. With the Atlas Lions, he earned one cap in 1996, scoring a brace against Armenia.

Abdelkrim Jinani began his managerial career in 2017 at Olympique Dcheira, where he became head coach in 2018, before managing RC Oued Zem, Hassania Agadir and Difaâ Hassani El Jadidi. In 2024, he joined Raja CA as assistant coach, then briefly served as interim head coach before joining the Libyan club Al Dhahra. Appointed manager of Moghreb Tetouan in 2026, he won the Botola 2 title and secured promotion. In November 2026, he became the manager of Raja.

== Club career ==
=== Raja CA ===
Abdelkarim Jinani was born on 2 September 1973 in Casablanca and grew up in Bournazel, Moulay Rachid. He joined the youth academy of Tihad AS before making his first-team debut in 1992. In 1995, he joined Tihad Sportif Club (Régies des tabacs), where he played for one and a half seasons.

During the 1996–97 winter transfer window, he joined Raja Club Athletic as a replacement for Salaheddine Bassir, who had moved to the Saudi club Al-Hilal. On 27 February, he made his debut against Olympique Khouribga at the Stade Mohamed V (0–0), in the group stage of the 1997 Arab Super Cup, held in Casablanca. He scored his first goal against Al-Faisaly in the same competition.

In the Botola, he opened his account against JS Massira, netting one of the two goals, the other was scored by Mustapha Moustawdae (2–1). On 22 March, he scored his first goal in the Champions League against SONACOS in Diourbel (0–2). He scored again in the next round against Mbilinga FC (3–0). On 11 May, he scored his only goal in the Casablanca derby after an assist from Jonas Ogandaga (2–2).

On 15 June 1997, led by Alexandru Moldovan, the Greens beat Hassania Agadir to secure their second consecutive league title (4–1, with a brace from Jinani and one goal each from Abdelilah Fahmi and Abdelkarim Nazir).

His last appearance before leaving for France came on 1 July 1997 against Kawkab de Marrakech (1–1, goal by Youssef Rossi).

=== Rennes and move to Switzerland ===
In the summer of 1997, Abdelkrim Jinani was transferred to Stade Rennais, a Division 1 club, along with Youssef Rossi. It was the most expensive transfer in the history of the Botola at that time (€1.25 million). Billed by some supporters as the new Jean-Pierre Papin, he made his debut on 2 August 1997 in an away match against Toulouse FC, which ended in defeat. However, his first performances were not up to expectations, and Jinani played only three matches for the Breton club.

In January 1998, he was loaned to the Division 2 side Stade Lavallois. He played nine matches there and scored once. Still under contract with Stade Rennais, he was loaned in June 1998 to the Chinese club Shenzhen Pingan, for six months. At the end of his loan, he returned to Europe, this time in the Swiss Ligue nationale B with SR Delémont, then in the top flight with Yverdon Sport.

=== Return to Raja ===
In November 2000, he returned to Raja during the winter transfer window. He came on as a substitute away against Fath US, then scored a goal against COD Meknès in the Meknes Honor Stadium. This was his last goal for Raja.

== International career ==
In 1990 and 1991, he was called up several times to the Morocco under-20 national team for training camps.

On 17 January 1996, he recorder his only match for the Morocco national team, in a friendly against Armenia at the Stade Jules-Ladoumègue, and scored a brace (6–0 win).

== Coaching career ==
Abdelkrim Jinani began his coaching career in March 2017, joining Botola Pro2 side Olympique Dcheira, as the assistant coach. After assisting Khalil Boudraa and then Abdellatif Jrindou, he became head coach in May 2018. Under his leadership, the team gradually established itself among the league's most competitive sides and regularly finished in the upper half of the table, notably on the podium, playing attractive football. He left his post in July 2021, after more than four years at the club.

On 28 November 2021, he signed an eighteen-month contract with Rapide Oued Zem, replacing the Tunisian Mounir Chebil. His task was avoid the relegation zone. Despite encouraging results, the team struggled to recover and Jinani left on 3 April 2022. In July 2022, he joined Hassania Agadir as the assistant to Marcos Paquetá. He continued his work alongside Abdelhadi Sektioui, who subsequently took charge. He left the club at the end of the 2022–23 season. On 5 July 2023, Jinani replaced Abderrahim Taleb as the head coach of Difaâ Hassani El Jadidi. The Doukkala club, which was relegated the previous season after nearly two decades in the top flight, relied on him to return to the Botola Pro. However, his spell was short-lived: he left his post in early December 2023.

On 25 July 2024, Abdelkrim Jinani returned to Raja, this time as assistant coach to Rusmir Cviko. After his sacking on 26 September, Jinani was put in charge on an interim basis. He led the Greens in three matches, winning all of them, before the arrival of Ricardo Sá Pinto on 10 October. On 30 January 2025, Jinani signed with the Libyan club Al Dhahra until the end of the season. On 12 March 2026, he took over Moghreb Tétouan, replacing Khalid Fouhami, while the club was competing for promotion to the top flight. He won the title and secured a place in the top flight for the coming season. However, on 4 September 2026, this spell came to an end before the start of the season, following a mutual agreement between the two parties.

On 30 October 2026, Jinani made another return to Raja, where he was appointed assistant coach to Paco Jémez, whose side had made a poor start to the season. Two days after the defeat to RS Berkane, the club sacked the Spaniard on 2 November. Jinani was then put in charge on an interim basis. He led the Greens to two victories, against AS FAR (1–2) and Ittihad Tanger (2–0). On 12 November, Raja confirmed him as head coach until the end of the season and tasked him with forming his technical staff.

== Honours ==
=== Player ===
Raja CA

- Botola: 1996–97

=== Manager ===
Moghreb Tetouan

- Botola 2: 2025–26
