= Victoria-Vanuatu Physician Project =

Canadian non-governmental organization

The Victoria-Vanuatu Physician Project (ViVa) was a Canadian non-governmental organization of physicians and their families from Victoria, British Columbia, Canada. For 24 years it supplied a medical doctor to the island of Tanna, Vanuatu.

== History ==
In 1990, CUSO International approached the James Bay Community Project in the city of Victoria, British Columbia, Canada, with the objective of creating a professional and cultural connection between Canada and another Pacific Rim country. After consultation with the Victoria Medical Society and the Government of the Republic of Vanuatu, it was decided to start a project that would provide medical doctors for rural Vanuatu.In 1991, a memorandum of understanding (MOU) was signed between the Government of the Republic of Vanuatu and the Victoria Doctors Association, later renamed the Victoria-Vanuatu Physician Project (also Society or Association) or ViVa for short. The job description was for 6-month postings as Medical Superintendent of Tafea province, stationed at Lenakel Hospital on the island of Tanna. In 1994, CUSO International assisted the ViVa organization in establishing itself as an independent Canadian non-profit society with registered charity status and the MOU was revised.

From 1991 to 2015, ViVa provided continuous physician coverage for Tafea province. As Medical Superintendent, the ViVa doctor's responsibilities included inpatient and outpatient care at Lenakel Hospital, minor surgeries and obstetrics, and regular visits to the nine Tafea provincial health outposts. In 2014 ViVa could no longer recruit enough Victoria physicians to sustain the project. At the same time, ni-Van (native Vanuatu) medical student graduates were returning from training in Cuba and China and would soon be available for placement around the country. ViVa gave 6-months written notice to the Government of Vanuatu of its intention to terminate the project. The Vanuatu Ministry of Health developed a transitional medical staffing plan to provide a rotation of ni-Van doctors to the Island.

On the 13th of March, 2015, six weeks after the last ViVa doctor left Vanuatu, the country was struck by Cyclone Pam, a Category 5 hurricane. The hospital and many homes were damaged or destroyed. ViVa changed its mandate to humanitarian relief and raised CAN$ 150,000 for rebuilding. Over the next 3 years, ViVa worked, from a distance, with the Australian Rotary Club of Port Macquarie (District 9650), New South Wales, and the Vanuatu National Disaster Management Office to use this money to renovate and repair the Lenakel Hospital and staff housing. Funds were exhausted and repairs completed in 2018. In March 2019, the Victoria-Vanuatu Physician Association revoked its charity status with the Canadian Revenue Agency and dissolved as a society.

== Administration ==
ViVa was a voluntary organization of physicians with no employees. Funds raised were used to subsidize return travel costs for the ViVa doctor and family, maintain and replace the doctor's motor vehicle as needed, and to purchase some medical equipment. The Government of Vanuatu provided housing, work visas, medical licensure, and salary (local scale) for each new doctor.

Most ViVa doctors were general practitioners with at least 3 years of clinical experience recruited from the greater Victoria area or elsewhere in British Columbia. Some Victoria specialist physicians provided advanced-skills training. A minimum 7-day crossover period allowed the incoming doctor and family to live and work on Tanna with the outgoing doctor and family.
