= Viva =

Viva may refer to:

== Companies and organisations ==
- Viva (network operator), a Dominican mobile network operator
- Viva Energy, an Australian petroleum company
- Viva Entertainment, a Philippine media company
- Viva Films, a Philippine film company
- Viva Media, an interactive entertainment company based in New York City
- Viva Records (Philippines), a Philippine record label
- Viva Records (U.S.), subsidiary of Snuff Garrett Records
- Viva! (organisation), a British animal rights group, which focuses on promoting veganism
- Vision with Values (branded as ViVa), political party in Guatemala
- Victoria-Vanuatu Physician Project (branded as ViVa), a Canadian organization that sends doctors to Vanuatu
- Voices In Vital America, a Vietnam War–era advocacy group

== Film ==
- Viva (2007 film), a 2007 film directed by Anna Biller
- Viva (2015 film), a 2015 Irish film directed by Paddy Breathnach

== Magazines ==
- Viva (American magazine), an adult woman's magazine that premiered in 1973
- Viva (Canadian magazine), a magazine focusing on holistic medicine that premiered in 2004
- Viva (Dutch magazine), a Dutch weekly magazine for women that premiered in 2012
- Viva!, Polish biweekly magazine

== Music ==
=== Bands ===
- Viva (band), an Indian pop girl group
- Viva, a 1990s British band, part of the Romo movement

=== Albums ===
- Viva (Bananarama album), 2009
- Viva (La Düsseldorf album) or the title song, 1978
- Viva! (Roxy Music album), 1976
- Viva (Xmal Deutschland album), 1987
- Viva!, by Jimsaku, 1992

=== Songs ===
- "Viva!", a song by Bond

== Radio ==
- Viva (Sirius XM), a channel on the Sirius XM Radio network
- Viva 963, a former UK radio channel

== Television ==
=== Channels and networks ===
- Viva (Brazil), a Brazilian TV channel owned by Globosat
- Viva (Canadian TV channel), later known as Oprah Winfrey Network
- Television channels and programming block operated by Viva Communications in the Philippines
  - Pinoy Box Office, a film channel launched in 1996, formerly known as Viva Cinema until 2003
- Viva Cinema, former name of Viva TV, a Philippine channel
- Viva (Israeli TV channel), an Israeli television channel
- VIVA Media, a German music television network
  - Viva (UK & Ireland), a former music and entertainment channel
  - VIVA Austria, German music and entertainment channel
  - VIVA Germany, music network which was available throughout Europe
  - VIVA Poland, later MTV Music (Poland), a music and entertainment channel
- Viva Nicaragua, a Nicaraguan television channel

== Transportation ==
=== Airlines ===
- Viva (airline), a Mexican airline
- Viva Air, a Spanish airline taken over by flag carrier Iberia
- Viva Air Colombia
- Viva Air Dominicana
- Viva Air Perú
- Viva Macau

=== Automobiles ===
- Chevrolet Viva, a Russian subcompact sedan
- Perodua Viva, a Malaysian supermini hatchback
- Vauxhall Viva, a British compact car
- Daewoo Lacetti, a Korean compact car, sold in Australia and New Zealand as the Holden Viva
- Opel Karl, a German supermini hatchback, sold in the United Kingdom and Ireland as the Vauxhall Viva

=== Transit systems ===
- Viva Rapid Transit, a bus transit system in Ontario, Canada

== Games ==
- Viva!: Revolution in Mexico, a 1975 board wargame that simulates the Mexican Revolution.

== Other ==
- IBM ViVA, Virtual Vector Architecture by IBM
- Viva (actress) (born 1938), American actress, writer and Andy Warhol model
- Viva Backus, a Peruvian brand of soft drink
- Viva, Iran, a village in Mazandaran Province
- Viva Kerala, a professional football club based in Kerala, India
- Viva Palestina, a British-based registered charity to the Gaza Strip
- Viva Piñata, a computer game for the Xbox 360 games console
- Viva (interjection), an expression meaning "long live"
- Viva World Cup, an international football tournament organized by the NFB
- Viva, short form of viva voce, another name for an oral exam
- Viva, a diminutive of the Russian first names:
  - male first name Aviv
  - female first name Aviva
- VIVA, a brand name of heavy-duty paper towels owned by Kimberly-Clark
- Viva, a brand of BSH Hausgeräte
- ViVa, a 1931 collection by E. E. Cummings
- Viva, a fictional character in the 2023 film Trolls Band Together
- Viva JKT48, a 2014 Indonesian film series

== See also ==
- Viva voce (disambiguation)
