= Stade Jules-Ladoumègue =

Stade Jules-Ladoumègue may refer to:

- Stade Jules-Ladoumègue (Massy), a stadium in Paris
- Stade Jules-Ladoumègue (Paris), a stadium in Paris
- Stade Jules-Ladoumègue (Romorantin-Lanthenay), a stadium in Romorantin-Lanthenay
- Stade Jules-Ladoumègue (Vitrolles), a stadium in Vitrolles
