= US Amal Tiznit =

Moroccan football club

Amal Tiznit
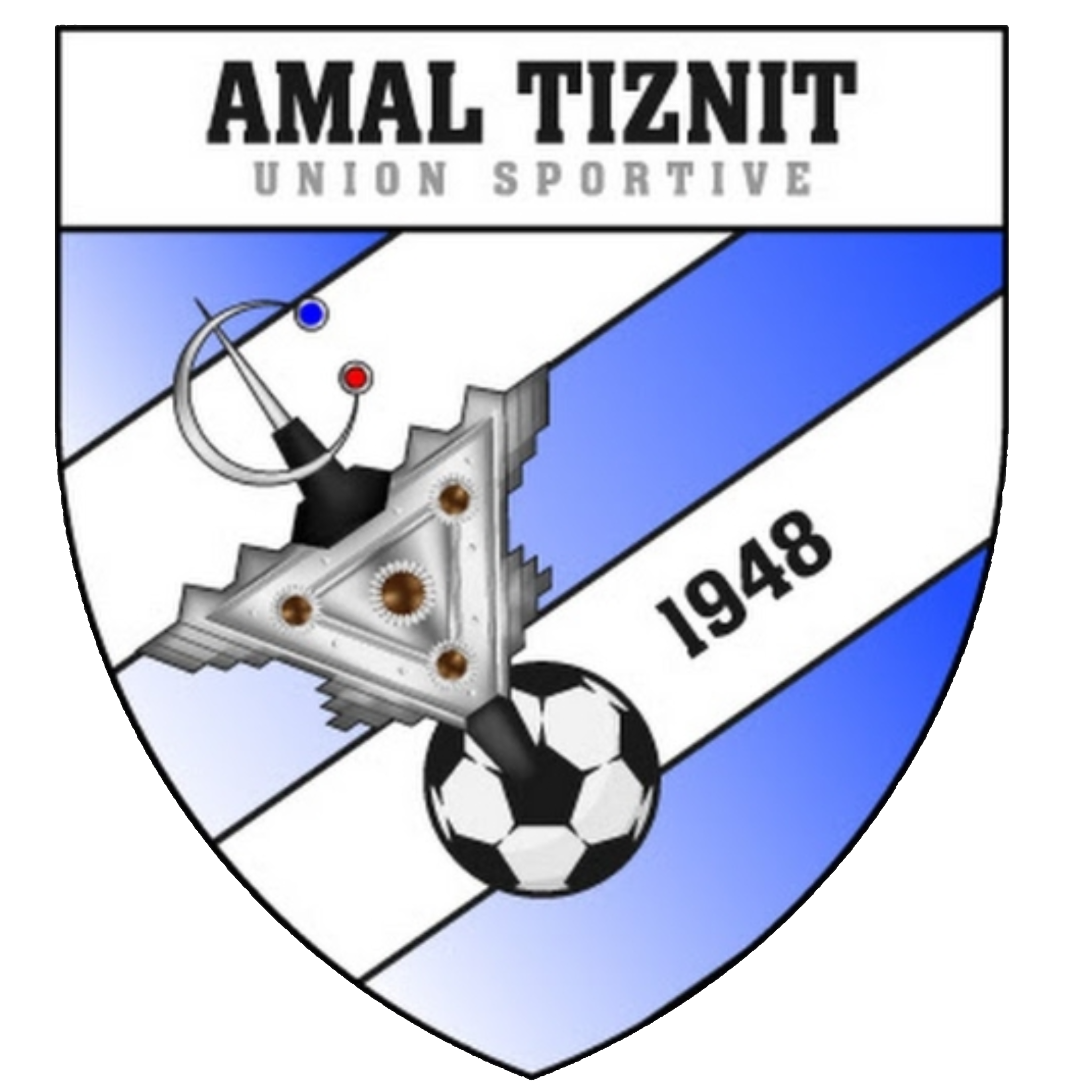
- Full name: Union Sportive Amal Tiznit
- Founded: 1948; 78 years ago
- Ground: Stade El Massira
- Capacity: 4,000
- Manager: Abderrahim Chkilit
- League: Botola Pro
- 2025–26: Botola Pro 2, 3rd of 16 (promoted via play-off)

Union Sportive Amal Tiznit (Tamazight: ⵜⴰⵎⵓⵏⵜ ⵜⴰⵡⵏⵏⵓⵏⵜ ⴰⵎⴰⵍ ⵜⵉⵣⵏⵉⵜ) (Arabic: الإتحاد الرياضي أمل تيزنيت) is a Moroccan football club from Tiznit founded in 1948 and currently playing in the Botola Pro.

== History ==
Amal Tiznit is a Moroccan football club based in the city of Tiznit, in the Souss-Massa region. The club has spent most of its history competing in the second or third division before earning a historic promotion to the top flight in 2026.

On 21 July 2026, the club secured a historic promotion to the top flight of Moroccan football for the first time in its history after a 1–1 draw, earning promotion to the Botola Pro.

On 24 September 2026, The club made its debut in a 3–1 loss against IR Tangier, with the clubs first-ever goal scored in the league by Soufiane El Azhari. Their first ever-victory came in their next match, in the second round of the 2026–27 Botola Pro, in which they defeated FUS Rabat 1–0 to claim their first 3 points.
