= US Boujaâd =

Moroccan football club

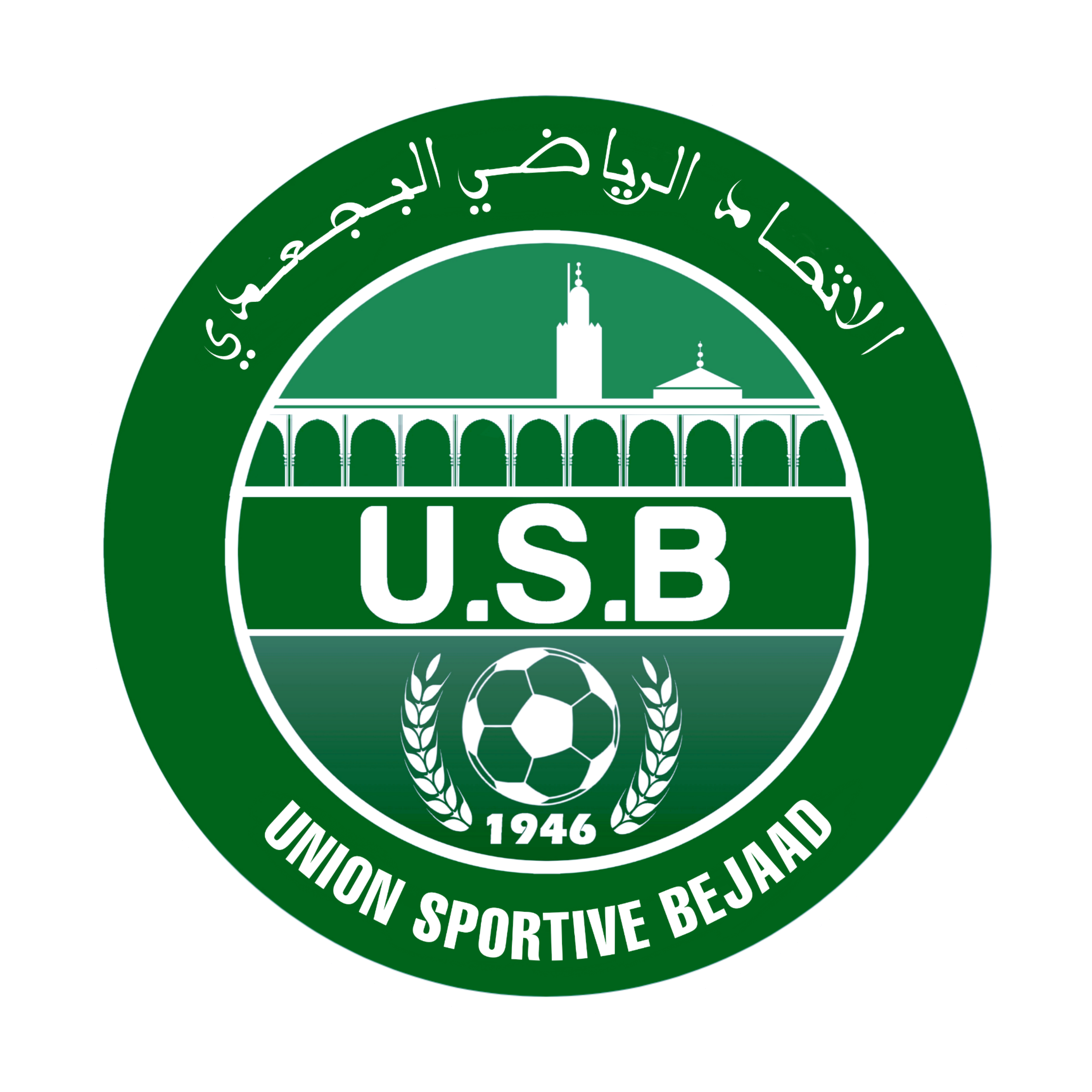
- Full name: Union Sportive Boujaâd
- Nickname: USB
- Founded: 1946; 80 years ago
- League: Botola Pro 2
- 2025–26: Botola Pro 2, 14th of 16

Union Sportive Boujaâd is a Moroccan football club founded in 1946 in Bejaâd of Khouribga Province. currently playing in the Botola Pro 2.
