= Akram Roumani =

Moroccan footballer (born 1978)

Personal information
- Full name: Akram Roumani
- Date of birth: 1 April 1978 (age 48)
- Place of birth: Fes, Morocco
- Height: 1.80 m (5 ft 11 in)
- Position: Defender

Youth career
- Maghreb Fez

Senior career*
Years	Team	Apps	(Gls)
1996–2000	Maghreb Fez		
2000–2007	Racing Genk	104	(2)
2005–2007	→ RBC Roosendaal (loan)	30	(0)
2007–2009	FUS Rabat		

International career
2000–2004	Morocco	13	(0)
- * Club domestic league appearances and goals as of 11:17, 31 July 2006 (UTC)

Akram Roumani (born 1 April 1978) is a Moroccan former footballer who played as a defender. He has played for the Morocco national football team on 13 occasions.

He started his career with Maghreb Fez (MAS Fes) in the Moroccan league, and was transferred to KRC Genk in 2000, for whom he made over 100 appearances.

He helped Genk win the Belgian title in 2002, only their second ever title.

Roumani was loaned to RBC Roosendaal for the 2005/06 season.

Roumani played for Morocco at the 2000 Olympics, and was in the squad for the 2002 African Nations Cup.
