= Abdessamad El Mobarky =

Moroccan footballer (born 1981)

Personal information
- Date of birth: 1 January 1981 (age 45)
- Place of birth: Casablanca, Morocco
- Height: 1.68 m (5 ft 6 in)
- Position: Midfielder

Team information
- Current team: Renaissance Zemamra
- Number: 21

Senior career*
Years	Team	Apps	(Gls)
2009–2011	Moghreb Tétouan	15	(2)
2011–2017	CR Al Hoceima	136	(34)
2017–2019	RS Berkane	34	(2)
2019–	Renaissance Zemamra	45	(12)

International career
2013–2016	Morocco	10	(2)
- * Club domestic league appearances and goals as of 27 July 2021

Abdessamad El Mobarky (Arabic: عبد الصمد المباركي; born 1 January 1981) is a Moroccan professional footballer who plays as a midfielder for Chabab Rif Al Hoceima.

== International career ==
In January 2014, coach Hassan Benabicha invited El Mobarky to be a part of the Morocco squad for the 2014 African Nations Championship. He helped the team to top group B after drawing with Burkina Faso and Zimbabwe and defeating Uganda. The team was eliminated from the competition at the quarter-finals after losing to Nigeria.
