= JS Soualem =

Moroccan football club

- Full name: Jeunesse Sportive Soualem
- Founded: 1984; 42 years ago
- Ground: Berrechid Municipal Stadium
- Capacity: 2,000
- Manager: Redouane El Haimer
- League: Botola Pro 2
- 2025–26: Botola Pro 2, 6th of 16
| Home colours | Away colours |

Jeunesse Sportive Soualem (Arabic: الشباب الرياضي السالمي) known as Chabab Riadi Salmi, is a Moroccan football club currently playing in the Botola Pro 2. The club is located in the town of Soualem.

== Season 2021/2022 ==
Jeunesse Sportive Soualem started its first season on first division with 2 wins against AS FAR (3–0) and MAS (3–0).
