= WS Témara =

Association football club in Morocco

Widad Témara
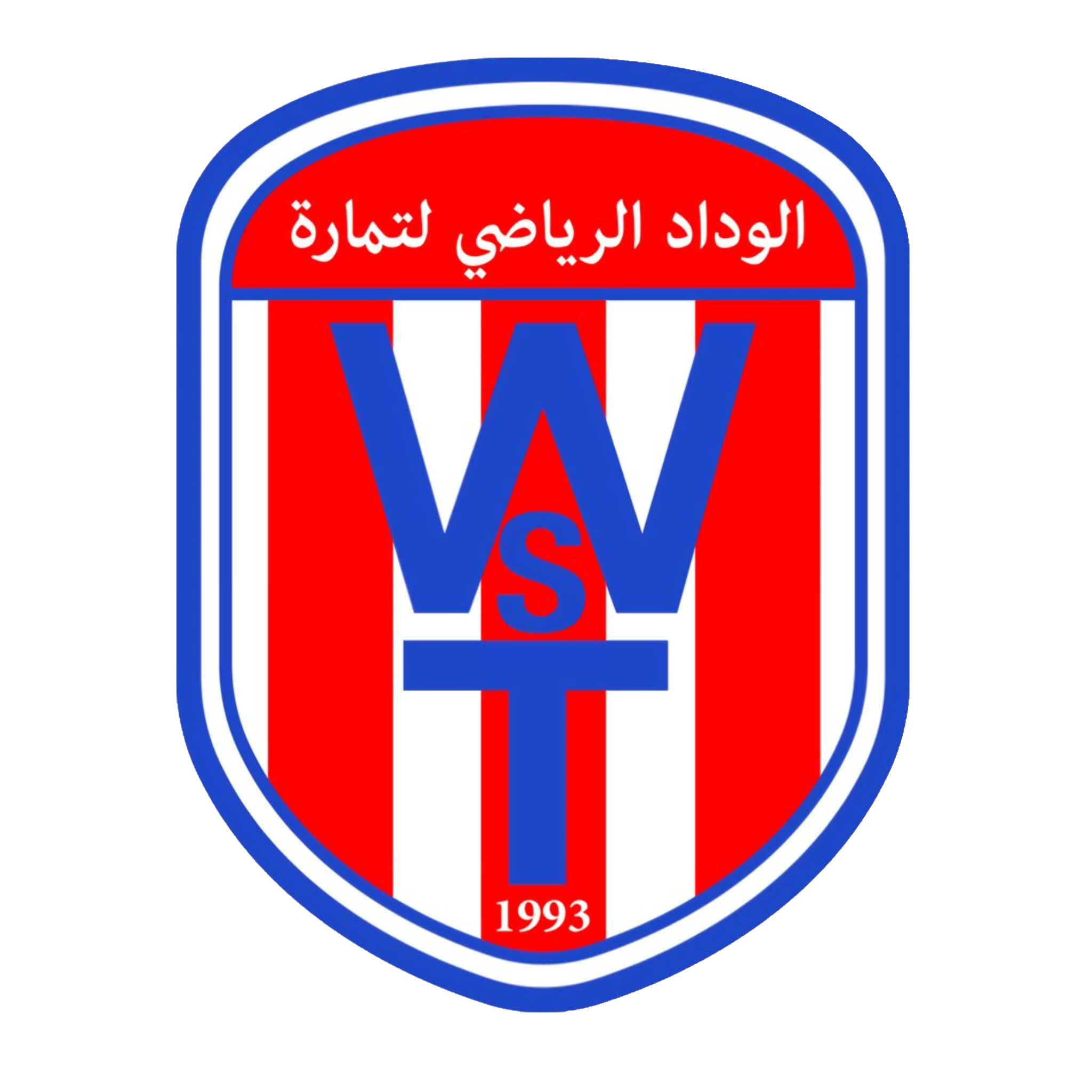
- Full name: Wydad Sportif de Temara
- Founded: 1993
- Ground: Stade Yacoub El Mansour
- Capacity: 5,000
- Manager: Abdessalam Benjelloun
- League: Botola Pro
- 2025–26: Botola Pro 2, 2nd of 16 (promoted)
- Website: widad-temara.com
Home colours	Away colours

Widad Sportive de Temara is a Moroccan football club currently playing in the Botola Pro. The club was founded in 1993 and is located in the town of Temara. Stade Yacoub El Mansour, which has a seating capacity of 5,000, is their home.

== History ==
On 20 June 2026, Widad Temara guaranteed promotion to the top flight after a 2-1 victory against Raja Beni Mellal.

On 26 September 2026, Widad Temara made their debut in the Botola Pro. In their first match against Wydad AC, Widad Temara won 3-1 after a penalty scored by Akram khouidssi followed by a brace from othman sabri, thus claiming their first victory in their first-ever appearance in the league.
