= US Yacoub El Mansour =

Moroccan football club

Union Yacoub El Mansour
- Full name: Union Sportive Yacoub El Mansour
- Nickname: USYM
- Founded: 17 July 1989; 37 years ago
- Ground: Rabat Olympic Stadium
- Capacity: 21,000
- Chairman: Mehdi Bensaid
- Manager: Mehdi Jabry
- League: Botola Pro 2
- 2025–26: Botola Pro, 15th of 16 (relegated)
- Website: usym.ma
Home colours	Away colours	Third colours

Union Sportive Yacoub El Mansour (Arabic: الاتحاد الرياضي يعقوب المنصور), commonly known as US Yacoub El Mansour or USYM, is a Moroccan football club based in the Yacoub El Mansour district of Rabat.

== History ==
On 18 May 2025, USYM secured promotion to Botola Pro for the first time in the club’s history with a goalless draw against Kawkab de Marrakech in the final round of Botola Pro D2. They finished the season second with 51 points.

This accomplishment was described as the culmination of a long-term, ambitious strategy focused on youth development and team-building beginning years prior.

Earlier, on 15 May 2025, the club moved into direct promotion position after a decisive 3–1 home victory over Rapide Club d’Oued-Zem, standing on the brink of their historic achievement.

Ahead of their maiden season in the top flight, USYM strengthened its squad by signing six new players on 21 July 2025, signaling ambition to compete strongly among Morocco's elite.

On 1 November 2025, USYM recorded their first-ever victory in the Botola, defeating RCA Zemamra 2–0 at the 6 November Stadium in Khemisset.

== Honours ==
- Botola Pro 2
  - Runner-up: 2024–25
- National
  - Winners (2): 2003–04, 2023–24
