= Had Soualem =

Coordinates: 33.41°N 7.84°W

Soualem
- Rural commune and town
- Had Soualem
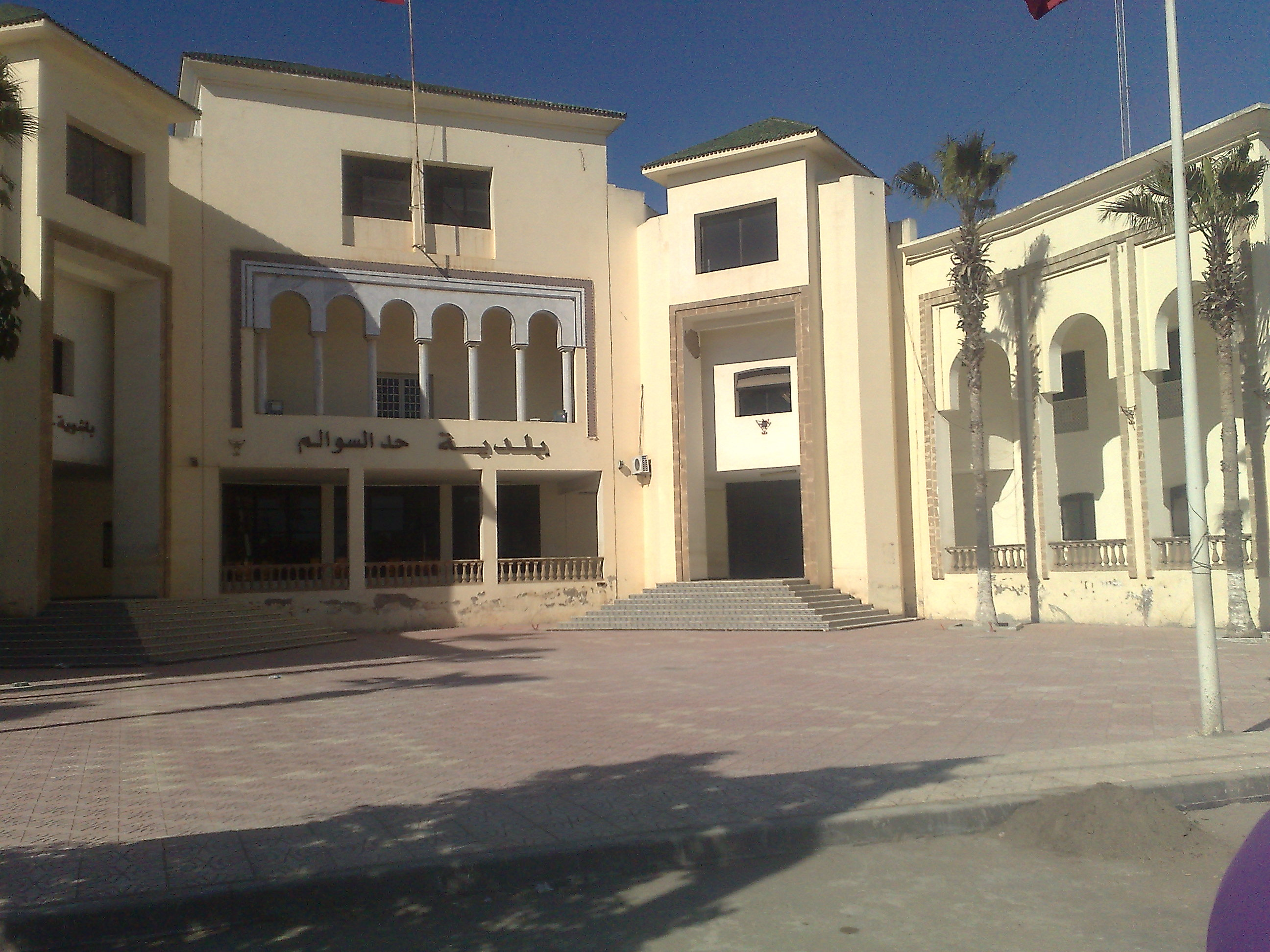
- بلدية حد السوالم -Municipalité de Had Soualem
- Country: Morocco
- Region: Casablanca-Settat
- Province: Berrechid

Population (2024)
  - Total: 74,762
- Time zone: UTC+0 (GMT)
- Postal code: 26402

Soualem is a town in Berrechid Province, Casablanca-Settat, Morocco. In the 2024 Moroccan census the commune recorded a population of 74,762 people . According to the 2014 census it had a population of 36,765.

Had Soualem is known for its rapid growth and proximity to Casablanca, it has become a dynamic hub for commerce and residential life. However, its development has brought both opportunities and challenges.

== Population Growth ==
Had Soualem has witnessed a significant increase in population, rising from 36,765 in 2014 to 74,762 in 2024, according to the Moroccan census. This growth is largely driven by its appeal as a residential area for those working in Casablanca, thanks to its affordability and location along key transportation routes.

== Culture ==
High-quality meat and "Choua" : One of Had Soualem's defining features is the exceptional quality of its meat. The town is widely recognized for its traditional choua (barbecue), attracting visitors from nearby cities to enjoy fresh, flavorful cuts. Restaurants and local butchers in Had Soualem take pride in offering some of the best meat in the region.

Souk Al-Had: Every Sunday, Had Soualem comes alive with its vibrant Souk Al-Had. This weekly market is a central part of the town's identity, offering everything from fresh produce and high-quality meat to household goods and traditional items. It is not just a shopping destination but also a social and cultural gathering point for residents and visitors alike.

== Challenges ==
Health Challenges: With the rapid population increase, healthcare facilities have struggled to keep up. The town faces a shortage of hospitals, clinics, and specialized medical services, making it challenging for residents to access timely care.

Security Concerns: Like many rapidly urbanizing areas, Had Soualem faces security challenges, including petty crimes and vandalism. While authorities have made efforts to improve security, there is still a need for police presence and community initiatives to ensure safety for residents.

Lack of Gardens or Public Spaces: Despite its growth, Had Soualem lacks essential public spaces such as parks or gardens where citizens can relax, socialize, or simply enjoy nature. This has been a frequent concern among residents who feel the town needs green spaces to enhance quality of life.
