= 18 November Stadium =

Sports venue in Khemisset, Morocco

Coordinates: 33°49′04″N 6°04′35″W

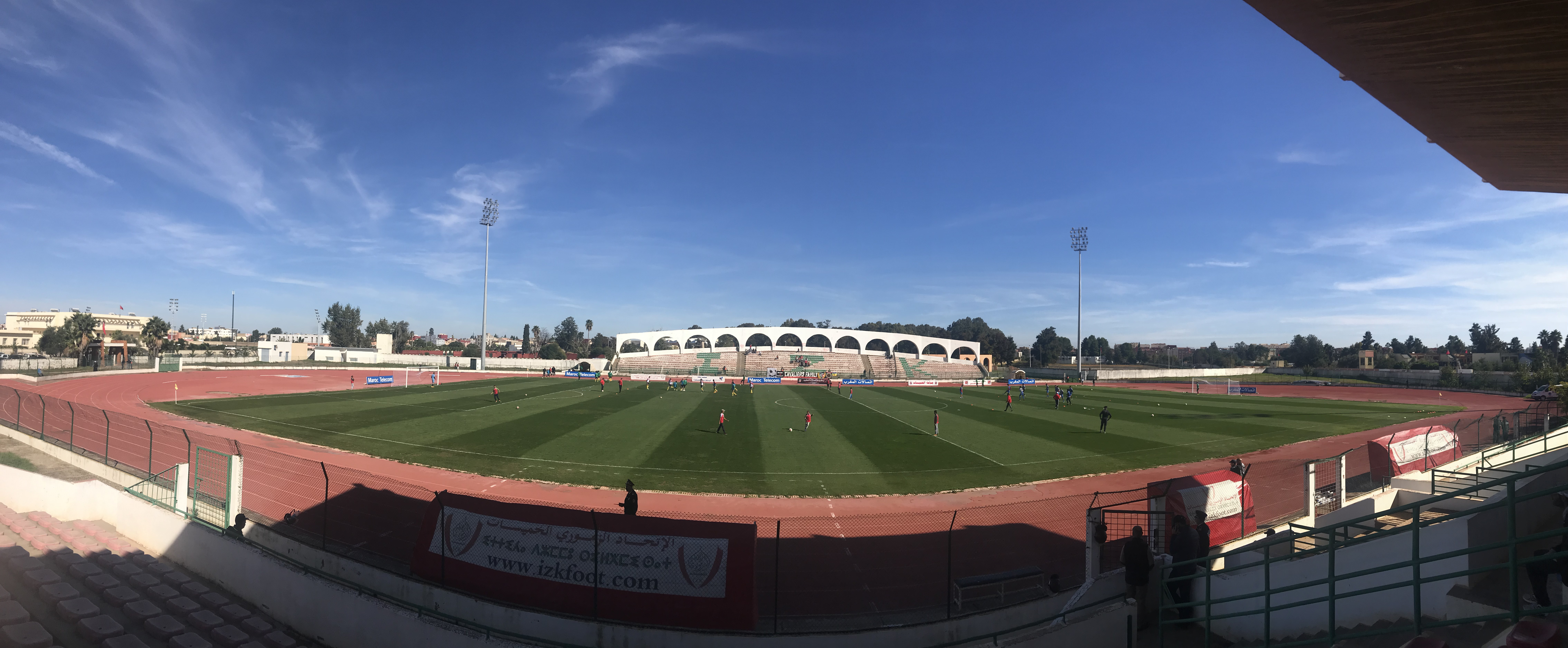
- Interactive map of 18 November Stadium
- Owner: City of Khemisset
- Capacity: 5,000
- Surface: Grass

Tenants
- IZ Khemisset; UTS Rabat (2024-2025)

18 November Stadium is a multi-use stadium in Khemisset, Morocco. It is used mostly for football matches and hosts the home games of IZ Khemisset. The stadium holds 5,000 people.
