= El Bachir Stadium =

Multi-purpose stadium in Rabat, Morocco

Coordinates: 33°41′44″N 7°23′57″W

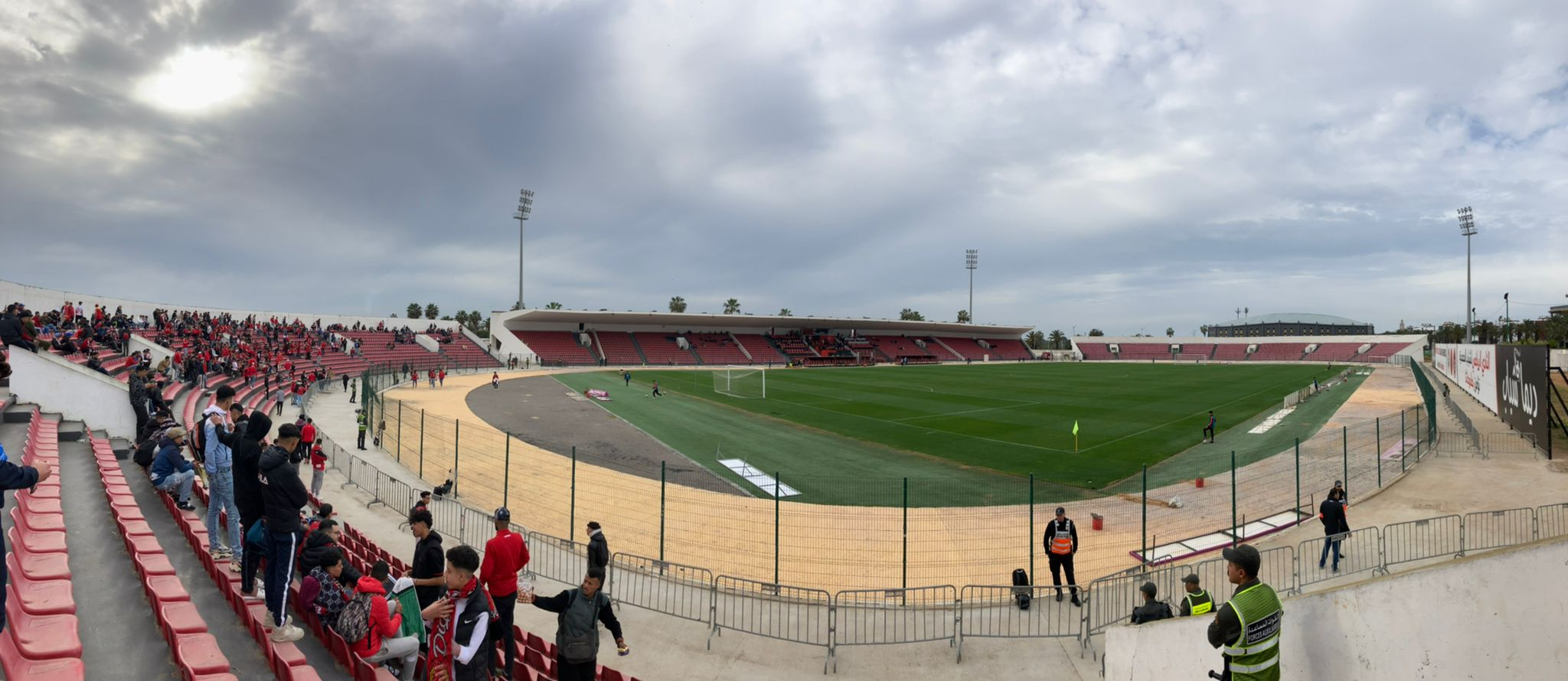
- Interactive map of El Bachir Stadium
- Former names: Stade Municipal de Mohammédia (1954–1959)
- Location: Mohammedia, Morocco
- Owner: Mohammedia Municipality
- Capacity: 10,000
- Surface: Grass
- Field size: 100 m × 70 m

Construction
- Opened: 1954
- Renovated: 2019

Tenant
- SCC Mohammédia (1954–present)

El Bachir Stadium (Arabic: ملعب البشير), is a multi-use stadium in Mohammedia, Morocco, built in 1954. It is currently used mostly for football matches. The stadium holds up to 10,000 people.

The stadium bore the name "Bachir" after Chabab Mohammedia's player during the 1950s and 1960s, Sir Abdessalam Bachir, a promising player who died in a tragic accident. The area of the official stadium with the stands is 11 hectares, while the annexed stadium area takes three hectares, and there is the third area that will soon be inaugurated as a sports hall.

The construction of Bachir Stadium dates back to the late Prince Moulay AbdAllah, the brother of the late King Hassan II, who used to visit the city of Mohammedia. The stadium was then small, its terraces were of wood and its capacity ranges from 600 to 700 spectators.

After a fall accident side of the stands in 1961, concrete bleachers were built. Grass was later on planted on the pitch in 1964.

SCC Mohammédia, the most popular club in the city, is hosting its matches in Bachir Stadium. Union de Mohammédia is now hosting its Amateur league matches in Alia Stadium located in the eastern side of the city.
