= Ben M'Hamed El Abdi Stadium =

Stadium in El Jadida, Morocco

Coordinates: 33°14′30″N 8°29′36″W

Ben M'Hamed El Abdi stadium
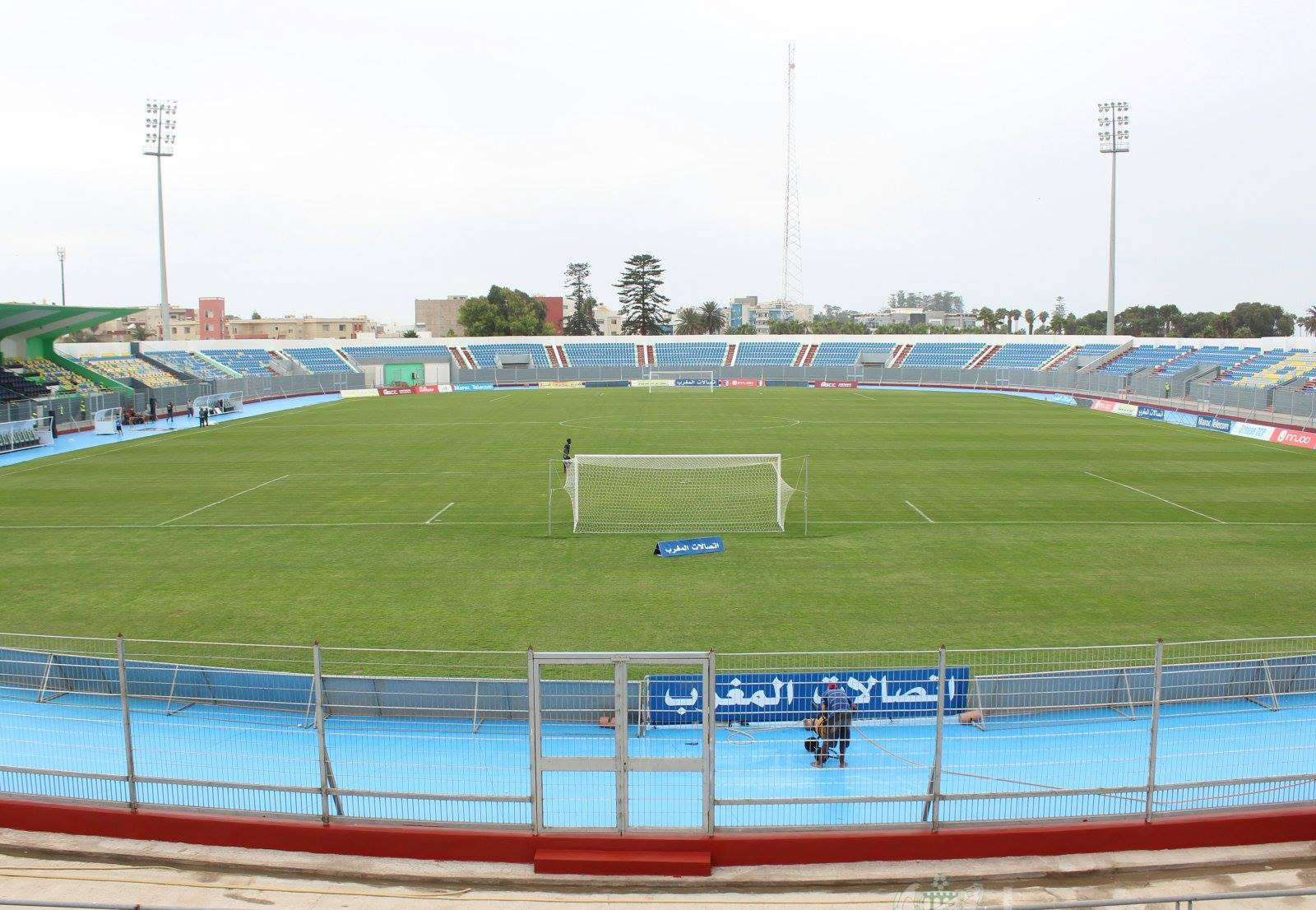
- Interactive map of Ben M'Hamed El Abdi stadium
- Full name: Ben M'Hamed El Abdi stadium
- Former names: Stade Mazagan; Stade Archambault (Archambaud or Archam baud)
- Address: 6GR4+HJX; El Jadida; Morocco
- Location: El Jadida, Morocco
- Owner: Difaa El Jadida
- Operator: Difaa El Jadida
- Capacity: 15,000
- Surface: Grass

Construction
- Renovated: 2017
- Expanded: 2009

Tenant
- DH El-Jadidi

Ben M'Hamed El Abdi Stadium is a multi-use stadium in El Jadida, Morocco. It is currently used mostly for football matches and hosts the home games of Difaa El Jadida. The stadium holds 15,000 people. It was named in honour of Ben M'Hamed El Abdi, the greatest player of Difaa El Jadida.
