= Phosphate Stadium =

Football stadium in Morocco

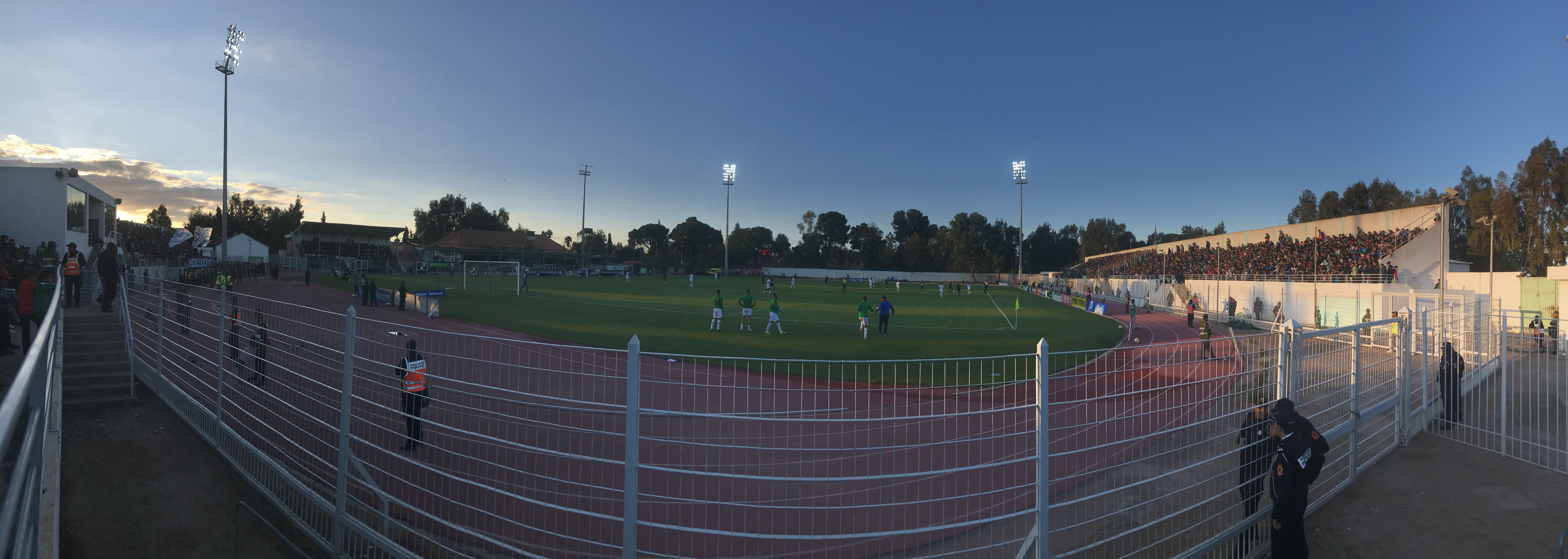
- Interactive map of Phosphate Stadium
- Location: Khouribga, Morocco
- Coordinates: 32°52′41″N 6°54′27″W
- Capacity: 10,000

Tenant
- Olympique Khouribga

Phosphate Stadium is a multi-use stadium in Khouribga, Morocco. It is currently used mostly for football matches and hosts the home games of Olympique Khouribga. The stadium holds 10,000 people.
