= 2020–21 Botola Pro =

Moroccan football league season

Botola Inwi
- Season: 2020–21
- Dates: 4 December 2020 – 28 July 2021
- Champions: Wydad AC; 21st title
- Relegated: MA Tétouan; RCA Zemamra
- Champions League: Wydad AC; Raja CA
- Confederation Cup: AS FAR; RS Berkane
- Matches: 240
- Goals: 540 (2.25 per match)
- Top goalscorer: Ayoub El Kaabi (18 goals)
- Biggest home win: MC Oujda 4-0 DH Jadidi (14 March 2021); Wydad AC 4-0 RS Berkane (2 May 2021)
- Biggest away win: Fath US 0-3 MC Oujda (16 May 2021); CAY Berrechid 0-3 MA Tétouan (27 May 2021); IR Tanger 0-3 Raja CA (16 June 2021)
- Highest scoring: Hassania Agadir 3–5 Wydad AC (13 June 2021)
- Longest winning run: 5 matches Wydad AC
- Longest unbeaten run: 15 matches Wydad AC
- Longest winless run: 10 matches SCC Mohammédia
- Longest losing run: 5 matches RCA Zemamra
- All statistics correct as of 01 August 2021.

The 2020–21 Botola Pro, also known as Botola Pro Inwi for sponsorship reasons, is the 64th season of the Premier League and the 10th under its new format of Moroccan Pro League, the top Moroccan professional league for association football clubs, since its establishment in 1956.

Raja Casablanca came into the season as defending champions of the 2019–20 season. Chabab Mohammédia and Maghreb de Fès entered as the two promoted teams from the 2019–20 Botola 2.

The season began on 4 December 2020 and ended on 28 July 2021.

Wydad AC are crowned champions of this edition three rounds before the end of the tournament with a record of 21 Botola.

== Teams ==
=== Stadium and locations ===
Locations of the 2020–21 Botola teams

Team	Location	Stadium	Capacity
CAYB	Berrechid	Stade Municipal	8,000
DHJ	El Jadida	Stade El Abdi	15,000
FAR	Rabat	Stade Moulay Abdellah	65,000
FUS	Rabat	Stade Moulay Hassan	12,000
HUSA	Agadir	Stade Adrar	45,480
IRT	Tanger	Stade Ibn Batouta	45,000
MAS	Fes	Fez Stadium	45,000
MAT	Tétouan	Saniat Rmel	15,000
MCO	Oujda	Honneur Stadium	35,000
OCS	Safi	Stade El Massira	15,000
RCA	Casablanca	Stade Mohamed V	67,000
RCAZ	Zemamra	Stade Municipal	5,000
RCOZ	Oued Zem	Stade Municipal	8,000
RSB	Berkane	Stade Municipal	15,000
SCCM	Mohammédia	Stade El Bachir	11,000
WAC	Casablanca	Stade Mohamed V	67,000

=== Personnel and kits ===
Teams	Managers	Captain	Kit manufacturer	Shirt sponsor
AS FAR	(Belgium) Sven Vandenbroeck	(Morocco) Jalal Daoudi	(Spain) Joma	
CAY Berrechid	(Morocco) Abderrahim Nejjar	(Morocco) Mourad Kaaouach	(Morocco) Bang Sports	Dalaa, Ould Bouazza, Alitkane, Or Blanc, Tiger^{1}, Alghalla^{1}, Samir^{2}, Campak^{2}
DH Jadida	(Algeria) Abdelhak Benchikha	(Morocco) El Mehdi Karnass	(Germany) Jako	Ozone, Radio Mars, TGCC^{1}
Fath US	(Senegal) Demba Mbaye	(Morocco) El Mehdi El Bassil	(Germany) Uhlsport	Novec, LafargeHolcim Maroc^{1}
HUS Agadir	(Morocco) Reda Hakam	(Morocco) Yassine Rami	(Italy) Legea	Afriquia, Souss-Massa, Agadir, Skoda^{1}, jaouda^{1}, AtlantaSanad^{2}^{3}, Joly^{3}, Moov'up^{3}
IR Tanger	(Morocco) Driss El Mrabet	(Morocco) Nouaman Aarab	(Morocco) Gloria	Tanger-Med, Experience Majorel^{1}
Maghreb AS	(Tunisia) Fathi Al-Jabal	(Morocco) Anass Azim	(Morocco) Mexxess	Ozone, GoldVision^{1}, Aïn Ifrane^{2}
MA Tétouan	(Spain) Toni Cosano	(Morocco) Adil El Hassnaoui	(Morocco) Bang Sports	Tanger-Med, Radio Mars, Halib Titawen^{1}
MC Oujda	(France) Bernard Casoni	(Morocco) Abdellah Khafifi	(Morocco) Bang Sports	Dari^{1}
OC Safi	(Belgium) Faouzi Jamal	(Morocco) Ahmed Bessak	(Morocco) Bang Sports	Fitco
Raja CA	(Tunisia) Lassaad Chabbi	(Morocco) Mouhcine Moutouali	(Italy) Legea	OLA Energy, Nor'Dar, Sofac^{3}, MarsaMaroc^{1}, Atlanta Sanad^{2}^{3}
RCA Zemamra	(Morocco) Mohamed Alaoui Ismaili	(Morocco) Brahim Nekkach	(Morocco) Bang Sports	Itqan, Igaser, Sahel et Sahara^{1}, SomaSteel^{2}
RC Oued Zem	(Morocco) Fouad Sahabi	(Morocco) Mourad Hibour	(Morocco) Bang Sports	
RS Berkane	(Democratic Republic of the Congo) Florent Ibengé	(Morocco) Mohamed Aziz	(Morocco) Bang Sports	Thé Dahmiss, GoldVision^{1}, Afriquia^{1}
SCC Mohammédia	(Morocco) Mohamed Fakhir	(Morocco) Ayoub Adila	(Morocco) Chabab	S.C.C.M, Vittel^{2}
Wydad AC	(Tunisia) Faouzi Benzarti	(Morocco) Salaheddine Saidi	(Italy) Macron	Ingelec, Or Blanc^{1}, Hyundai^{2}^{3}, Alitkane^{3}

1. On the back of shirt.
2. On the sleeves.
3. On the shorts.
Additionally, referee kits are made by Puma.

=== Managerial changes ===
Teams	Outgoing manager	Manner of departure	Date of vacancy	Incoming manager	Date of appointment
Moghreb Tétouan	(Morocco) Jamal Drideb	22 September 2020	End of contract	(Serbia) Zoran Manojlović	22 September 2020
Moghreb Tétouan	(Serbia) Zoran Manojlović	Resigned	12 October 2020	(Spain) Juan José Maqueda	22 October 2020
Mouloudia Oujda	(Algeria) Abdelhak Benchikha	End of contract	12 October 2020	(Morocco) Abdeslam Ouaddou	14 October 2020
Difaâ El Jadidi	(Morocco) Jamal Amanallah	End of contract	12 October 2020	(Algeria) Abdelhak Benchikha	19 October 2020
Rapide Oued Zem	(Tunisia) Mounir Chebil	Contract termination	15 October 2020	(Morocco) Youssef Fertout	26 October 2020
Nahdat Zemamra	(Tunisia) Otmane El Assas	End of tenure as caretake	26 October 2020	(Morocco) Mohamed Alaoui Ismaili	26 October 2020
IR Tanger	(Spain) Juan Pedro Benali	Contract termination	5 November 2020	(Morocco) Driss El Mrabet	5 November 2020
Hassania Agadir	(Morocco) Mustapha Ouchrif	Contract termination	12 November 2020	(Tunisia) Mounir Chebil	12 November 2020
Wydad Casablanca	(Argentina) Miguel Ángel Gamondi	Resigned	15 November 2020	(Tunisia) Faouzi Benzarti	15 November 2020
Moghreb Tétouan	(Spain) Juan José Maqueda	Contract termination	23 December 2020	(Morocco) Jamal Drideb (interim)	23 December 2020
AS FAR	(Morocco) Abderrahim Talib	Contract termination	29 December 2020	(Morocco) Adil Serraj (interim)	29 December 2020
Nahdat Zemamra	(Morocco) Mohamed Alaoui Ismaili	Contract termination	5 January 2021	(Morocco) Khalid Fouhami	7 January 2021
Moghreb Tétouan	(Morocco) Jamal Drideb (interim)	End of tenure as caretake	7 January 2021	(Morocco) Younes Ben Lahmar	7 January 2021
AS FAR	(Morocco) Adil Serraj (interim)	End of tenure as caretake	9 January 2021	(Belgium) Sven Vandenbroeck	9 January 2021
Mouloudia Oujda	(Morocco) Abdeslam Ouaddou	End of contract	9 January 2021	(France) Bernard Casoni	16 January 2021
Maghreb de Fès	(Morocco) Abdellatif Jrindou	End of contract	23 February 2021	(Argentina) Miguel Ángel Gamondi	25 February 2021
Moghreb Tétouan	(Morocco) Younes Ben Lahmar	End of tenure as caretake	24 February 2021	(Morocco) Jamal Drideb	24 February 2021
Rapide Oued Zem	(Morocco) Youssef Fertout	Sacked	24 February 2021	(Morocco) Azzeddine Belkbir (interim)	24 February 2021
Nahdat Zemamra	(Morocco) Khalid Fouhami	Contract termination	1 March 2021	(Morocco) Mohamed Alaoui Ismaili	4 March 2021
RS Berkane	(Morocco) Tarik Sektioui	Resigned	6 March 2021	(Spain) Juan Pedro Benali	18 March 2021
Hassania Agadir	(Tunisia) Mounir Chebil	Contract termination	8 March 2021	(Morocco) Reda Hakam	8 March 2021
Rapide Oued Zem	(Morocco) Azzeddine Belkbir (interim)	End of tenure as caretake	4 April 2021	(Morocco) Fouad Sahabi	4 April 2021
Raja CA	(Morocco) Jamal Sellami	Resigned	7 April 2021	(Morocco) Mohamed Bekkari (interim)	7 April 2021
Raja CA	(Morocco) Mohamed Bekkari (interim)	End of tenure as caretake	13 April 2021	(Tunisia) Lassaad Chabbi	13 April 2021
FUS Rabat	(Morocco) Mustapha El Khalfi	Resigned	26 April 2021	(Senegal) Demba Mbaye	26 April 2021
Maghreb de Fès	(Argentina) Miguel Ángel Gamondi	Mutual consent	28 April 2021	(Morocco) Aziz Slimani (interim)	28 April 2021
Olympic Safi	(Morocco) Abdelhadi Sektioui	Resigned	10 May 2021	(Morocco) Chiba Said (interim)	12 May 2021
Maghreb de Fès	(Morocco) Aziz Slimani (interim)	End of tenure as caretake	15 May 2021	(Tunisia) Fathi Al-Jabal	15 May 2021
SCC Mohammédia	(Morocco) Mohamed Amine Benhachem	Mutual consent	16 May 2021	(Morocco) Rachid Rokki (interim)	16 May 2021
SCC Mohammédia	(Morocco) Rachid Rokki (interim)	End of tenure as caretake	7 June 2021	(Morocco) Mohamed Fakhir	7 June 2021
RS Berkane	(Spain) Juan Pedro Benali	Mutual consent	23 June 2021	(France) David Boulengi (interim)	23 June 2021
RS Berkane	(France) David Boulengi (interim)	End of tenure as caretake	5 July 2021	(Democratic Republic of the Congo) Florent Ibengé	5 July 2021
Olympic Safi	(Morocco) Chiba Said (interim)	End of tenure as caretake	5 July 2021	(Belgium) Faouzi Jamal	8 July 2021
Moghreb Tétouan	(Morocco) Jamal Drideb	Mutual consent	15 July 2021	(Spain) Toni Cosano	15 July 2021

=== Foreign players ===
All teams are allowed to register up to five foreign players, but can only use up to three players on the field at the same time.

Club	Player 1	Player 2	Player 3	Player 4	Player 5
AS FAR	(Ivory Coast) Joseph Guédé Gnadou	(Cape Verde) Diney	(Democratic Republic of the Congo) Yannick Bangala Litombo	(Mali) Aboubacar Toungara	
Chabab Mohammédia	(Benin) Hintan Bakum	(Ivory Coast) Hervé Guy	(Gabon) Loïc Nze	(Mali) Youssouf Traoré	(Yemen) Ahmed Al-Sarori
Difaâ El Jadidi	(Cameroon) Meke Meyenga	(Republic of the Congo) Stanislas Dua Ankira	(Democratic Republic of the Congo) Dieumerci Amale	(Democratic Republic of the Congo) Jonathan Ifunga Ifasso	(Kenya) Masoud Juma
FUS Rabat	(Ivory Coast) Cedric Elysée Kodjo	(Cameroon) Jean-Joseph Kombous	(Libya) Mohamed Anis Saltou		
Hassania Agadir	(Burkina Faso) Patrick Malo	(Senegal) Bakary Mané	(Senegal) Malick Cisse		
IR Tanger	(Democratic Republic of the Congo) Mukoko Batezadio	(Gabon) Axel Meye	(Gabon) Stévy Nzambé	(Senegal) Youssoupha Konaté	
Maghreb de Fès	(Ivory Coast) Franck Guiza	(Ivory Coast) Oumar Camara	(Democratic Republic of the Congo) Nelson Munganga	(Mali) Abdoulaye Diarra	(Nigeria) Alimi Sikiru
Moghreb Tétouan	(Cameroon) Innocent Assana	(Senegal) Mame Gueye	(Tanzania) Shaaban Idd Chilunda		
Mouloudia Oujda	(Algeria) Abdellah El Moudene	(Ivory Coast) Lamine Diakité	(Mali) Demba Camara	(Mali) Yacouba Sylla	(Senegal) Ricky Ngatchou
Nahdat Berkane	(Burkina Faso) Issoufou Dayo	(Burkina Faso) Alain Traoré	(Burkina Faso) Djibril Ouattara		
Nahdat Zemamra	(Republic of the Congo) Carof Bakoua	(Gabon) Abdou Atchabao	(Gabon) Grace Obiang	(Guinea) Amadou Oury Barry	
Olympic Safi	(Brazil) Cláudio	(Brazil) Polaco	(Brazil) Robert William	(Ivory Coast) Thierry Kassi	
Raja Casablanca	(Burkina Faso) Soumaïla Ouattara	(Democratic Republic of the Congo) Ben Malango	(Democratic Republic of the Congo) Fabrice Ngoma	(Libya) Sanad Al Warfali	
Rapide Oued Zem	(Burkina Faso) Aliou Chitou	(Ivory Coast) Jean-Baptiste Nangui	(Ivory Coast) Nilmar Mondésir Blé	(Mali) Ibrahim Sangaré	
Wydad Casablanca	(Ivory Coast) Cheick Comara	(Libya) Muaid Ellafi	(Nigeria) Michel Babatunde	(Tanzania) Simon Msuva	
Youssoufia Berrechid	(Tanzania) Nickson Kibabage	(Uganda) Patrick Kaddu			

== League table ==
Pos	Team	Pld	W	D	L	GF	GA	GD	Pts	Qualification or relegation
1	Wydad AC (C)	30	20	7	3	58	26	+32	67	Qualification for Champions League
2	Raja CA	30	17	8	5	48	26	+22	59	Qualification for Champions League
3	AS FAR	30	14	9	7	39	29	+10	51	Qualification for Confederation Cup
4	RS Berkane	30	13	6	11	37	36	+1	45	Qualification for Confederation Cup
5	Mouloudia Oujda	30	12	6	12	38	35	+3	42	
6	Hassania Agadir	30	9	10	11	23	24	−1	37	
7	Maghreb de Fès	30	7	15	8	30	34	−4	36 (Note: Head-to-head: Maghreb de Fès: 4 points, IR Tanger: 1 point.)	
8	IR Tanger	30	10	6	14	29	36	−7	36	
9	FUS Rabat	30	8	11	11	32	36	−4	35 (Note: Head-to-head: FUS Rabat: 11 points, Chabab Mohammédia: 9 point, Olympic Safi: 7 point, Difaâ El Jadidi: 5 point.)	
10	Chabab Mohammédia	30	7	14	9	26	25	+1	35	
11	Olympic Safi	30	8	11	11	30	41	−11	35	
12	Difaâ El Jadidi	30	9	8	13	32	40	−8	35	
13	Rapide Oued Zem	30	7	12	11	28	36	−8	33 (Note: Head-to-head: Rapide Oued Zem: 4 points, Youssoufia Berrechid: 1 point.)	
14	Youssoufia Berrechid	30	7	12	11	23	33	−10	33	
15	Moghreb Tétouan (R)	30	6	14	10	36	43	−7	32	Relegation to Botola 2
16	Nahdat Zemamra (R)	30	7	9	14	31	40	−9	30	Relegation to Botola 2

Source: FRMF.ma
Rules for classification: 1) Points; 2a) Head-to-head goal difference if they are two teams with equal points; 2b) Goal difference if they are more than two teams with equal points; 3) Number of wins; 4) Goals scored; 5) Play-off between involved teams.
(C) Champions; (R) Relegated

== Results ==
Home \ Away	CAYB	DHJ	FAR	FUS	HUSA	IRT	MAS	MAT	MCO	OCS	RCA	RCAZ	RCOZ	RSB	SCCM	WAC
CAY Berrechid	—	0–1	1–1	2–1	0–0	1–0	1–1	0–3	0–1	0–0	1–0	1–1	1–1	1–0	0–1	0–1
DH Jadidi	2–3	—	1–0	3–1	1–0	0–0	1–2	2–2	2–2	0–1	0–0	1–0	1–1	3–1	0–0	0–1
AS FAR	3–2	1–0	—	0–0	0–2	2–1	3–2	2–3	1–0	0–0	1–1	2–1	1–1	3–1	1–1	0–0
Fath US	1–2	1–1	2–1	—	0–0	0–1	0–1	2–1	0–3	2–1	3–3	1–2	0–0	3–1	2–0	0–0
HUS Agadir	2–1	2–0	0–1	0–0	—	0–1	1–1	1–1	1–0	2–0	0–0	1–0	3–1	1–2	0–0	3–5
IR Tanger	2–0	0–1	1–2	1–2	1–1	—	0–0	1–1	1–2	1–0	0–3	2–0	0–1	0–2	0–1	3–2
Maghreb AS	1–1	1–3	2–1	1–1	0–0	2–1	—	0–0	2–1	1–2	2–3	2–2	2–1	2–0	1–1	0–1
MA Tétouan	0–0	2–2	0–0	2–2	2–1	1–0	0–0	—	0–1	1–3	2–3	3–0	1–1	2–3	0–2	2–2
MC Oujda	3–1	4–0	1–2	0–1	1–0	0–0	3–0	1–2	—	3–2	0–2	1–2	0–0	0–1	3–2	0–2
OC Safi	1–1	4–3	0–3	0–1	1–0	1–1	1–1	0–0	0–0	—	2–2	2–2	2–1	0–0	1–1	2–1
Raja CA	1–1	2–0	3–2	1–1	0–1	2–0	1–0	4–1	3–0	2–0	—	1–0	3–2	0–1	1–0	1–2
RCA Zemamra	0–0	1–0	0–2	1–0	1–0	4–1	1–1	3–0	3–4	1–2	1–1	—	1–1	0–2	1–1	1–2
RC Oued Zem	2–0	0–2	0–0	2–1	0–1	1–2	0–0	2–1	1–1	2–1	0–2	3–2	—	1–3	3–2	0–1
RS Berkane	1–1	2–0	1–2	3–2	1–0	1–2	1–1	1–1	3–1	3–0	0–1	2–0	0–0	—	1–1	0–2
SCC Mohammédia	0–1	2–0	0–2	0–0	0–0	1–2	1–1	0–0	0–1	3–0	1–2	1–0	0–0	2–0	—	1–1
Wydad AC	2–0	4–2	2–0	3–2	3–0	2–4	2–0	4–2	1–1	3–1	2–0	0–0	2–0	4–0	1–1	—

Updated to match(es) played on 28 July 2021. Source: Goalzz
Legend: Blue = home team win; Yellow = draw; Red = away team win.
For upcoming matches, an "a" indicates there is an article about the rivalry between the two participants.

=== Positions by round ===
The table lists the positions of teams after each week of matches.

Team ╲ Round	1	2	3	4	5	6	7	8	9	10	11	12	13	14	15	16	17	18	19	20	21	22	23	24	25	26	27	28	29	30
Wydad AC	3	2	5	3	2	1	1	2	2	1	1	1	1	1	1	1	1	1	1	1	1	1	1	1	1	1	1	1	1	1
Raja Casablanca	7	5	2	1	1	2	2	1	1	2	2	2	2	2	2	2	2	2	2	2	2	2	2	2	2	2	2	2	2	2
ASFAR	12	15	10	10	11	10	8	7	4	3	3	3	4	3	3	3	3	3	3	3	3	3	3	3	3	3	3	3	3	3
RS Berkane	2	4	3	6	3	3	3	3	8	9	12	9	6	7	7	6	7	7	9	9	11	5	7	10	6	4	4	4	4	4
Mouloudia Oujda	9	11	15	16	16	16	16	15	11	7	5	5	8	9	6	7	6	6	5	6	5	8	6	4	4	5	5	5	5	5
Hassania Agadir	13	12	11	14	12	14	11	9	9	5	4	6	3	4	4	5	4	4	4	5	8	9	9	8	5	6	7	9	10	6
Maghreb de Fès	5	7	7	5	6	5	5	4	6	6	11	12	12	6	9	12	9	8	11	12	12	12	13	11	10	7	6	6	6	7
IR Tanger	6	3	1	2	4	4	7	10	5	8	6	7	5	5	5	4	5	5	7	4	4	4	4	5	7	9	10	8	7	8
SCC Mohammédia	1	1	4	4	5	6	9	8	10	12	8	8	10	12	11	10	10	11	14	14	14	14	14	12	12	12	13	10	8	9
Fath Union Sport	8	6	8	8	8	11	13	12	12	13	9	10	13	10	8	9	12	9	6	9	9	10	10	9	11	11	12	12	13	10
Difaâ Hassani El Jadidi	11	14	13	15	15	15	10	11	14	14	14	14	16	14	14	14	14	14	12	10	10	11	11	13	13	13	9	7	9	11
Olympic Club de Safi	4	8	6	7	7	7	4	5	3	4	7	4	7	8	10	8	8	10	10	8	7	6	8	6	8	8	11	11	11	12
Rapide Oued Zem	10	10	14	13	14	13	15	14	15	15	15	16	15	16	15	15	15	15	13	13	13	15	12	15	15	16	14	14	12	13
Youssoufia Berrechid	15	13	12	11	13	9	6	6	7	11	10	11	9	11	13	13	13	13	15	15	15	13	15	14	14	14	16	16	15	14
Moghreb Tétouan	14	9	9	9	10	8	12	13	13	10	13	13	11	13	12	11	11	12	8	7	6	7	5	7	9	10	8	13	14	15
Renaissance Zemamra	16	16	16	12	9	12	14	16	16	16	16	15	14	15	16	16	16	16	16	16	16	16	16	16	16	15	15	15	16	16

Leader and CAF Champions League
CAF Champions League
CAF Confederation Cup
Relegation to Botola 2

Source: Botola

== Season statistics ==
=== Top goalscorers ===
As of 28 July 2021

Rank	Player	Club	Goals
1	(Morocco) Ayoub El Kaabi	Wydad AC	18
2	(Democratic Republic of the Congo) Ben Malango	Raja CA	16
3	(Morocco) Soufiane Rahimi	Raja CA	14
4	(Gabon) Axel Méyé	IR Tanger	12
5	(Morocco) Salaheddine Benyachou	OC Safi	9
5	(Morocco) El Mehdi El Bassil	Fath US	9
7	(Morocco) Alaeddine Ajaraie	Maghreb AS	8
7	(Morocco) Oussama Lamlioui	SCC Mohammédia	8
7	(Morocco) Youssef El Fahli	HUS Agadir	8
7	(Guinea) Demba Camara	MC Oujda	8

=== Hat-tricks ===
Player	For	Against	Result	Date	Round
(Morocco) Salaheddine Benyachou^{4}	OC Safi	DH El Jadidi	4–3 (H)	5 December 2020	1
(Morocco) Ayoub El Kaabi	Wydad AC	DH El Jadidi	4–2 (H)	9 June 2021	17

(H) – Home; (A) – Away
^{4} – Player scored four goals.

=== Clean Sheets ===
As of 28 July 2021

Rank	Player	Club	Clean sheets
1	(Morocco) Ahmed Reda Tagnaouti	Wydad AC	14
2	(Morocco) Anas Zniti	Raja CA	13
3	(Morocco) Ayoub Lakred	AS FAR	11
4	(Morocco) Abderahmane El Houasli	HUS Agadir	9
4	(Morocco) Yahia El Filali	MA Tétouan	9
4	(Morocco) Soufiane Barrouhou	DH Jadidi	9
7	(Morocco) Mehdi Ouaya	RC Oued Zem	8
8	(Morocco) Marouane Fakhr	MC Oujda	7
8	(Morocco) Mohamed Boujad	CAY Berrechid	7
8	(Morocco) Mehdi Harrar	SCC Mohammédia	7
8	(Morocco) Hamza Hamiani Akbi	RS Berkane	7

=== Scoring ===
- First goal of the season:
  (Morocco) Salaheddine Icharane for Chabab Mohammédia against Moghreb Tétouan (4 December 2020)
- Last goal of the season:
  (Morocco) Ayoub Mallouki for Hassania Agadir against Difaâ El Jadidi (28 July 2021)

=== Discipline ===
As of 28 July 2021

==== Player ====
- Most yellow cards: 10
  - (Morocco) Ayoub Qasmi (MC Oujda)
- Most red cards: 2
  - (Morocco) El Mehdi Karnass (DH Jadida)
  - (Morocco) Larbi Naji (RS Berkane)
  - (Morocco) Yassine Rami (HUS Agadir)
  - (Morocco) Hicham Taik (CAY Berrechid)
  - (Morocco) Hamza Semmoumy (MC Oujda)
  - (Burkina Faso) Issoufou Dayo (RS Berkane)
  - (Morocco) Salaheddine Bahi (MC Oujda)
  - (Morocco) Karim El Bounagate (OC Safi)
  - (Morocco) Anas El Asbahi (IR Tanger)
  - (Morocco) Abdelkhalek Hamidouch (RCA Zemamra)
  - (Morocco) Ayoub Gaadaoui (OC Safi)

==== Club ====
- Most yellow cards: 74
  - MC Oujda
- Most red cards: 9
  - RS Berkane
- Fewest yellow cards: 42
  - Raja CA
- Fewest red cards: 1
  - AS FAR

== Annual awards ==
The UMFP (Union Marocaine des Footballeurs Professionnels), in partnership with the Royal Moroccan Football Federation, organized the Night of Stars Award in its 7th edition, which celebrated the brilliants of the Botola Pro for the 2020/21 season.

Award	Winner	Club
Manager of the Season	(Tunisia) Faouzi Benzarti	Wydad AC
Player of the Season	(Morocco) Soufiane Rahimi	Raja CA
Foreign Player of the Season	(Republic of the Congo) Ben Malango	Raja CA
Promising Player of the Season	(Morocco) Salaheddine Benyachou	OC Safi
Goalkeeper of the Season	(Morocco) Anas Zniti	Raja CA
Defender of the Season	(Morocco) Achraf Dari	Wydad AC
Midfielder of the Season	(Morocco) Yahya Jabrane	Wydad AC
Forward of the Season	(Morocco) Ayoub El Kaabi	Wydad AC
Club of the Season	Wydad AC	

Team of the Season
Goalkeeper	(Morocco) Anas Zniti (Raja CA)			
Defence	(Morocco) Mohamed Chibi (IR Tanger)	(Morocco) Marouane Hadhoudi (Raja CA)	(Morocco) Achraf Dari (Wydad AC)	(Morocco) Hamza El Moussaoui (MA Tétouan)
Midfield	(Morocco) Mohamed Ounajem (Zamalek SC)	(Morocco) Mohamed Hrimat (FAR Rabat)	(Morocco) Yahya Jabrane (Wydad AC)	(Morocco) Soufiane Rahimi (EJS Casablanca)
Attack	(Republic of the Congo) Ben Malango (Raja CA)		(Morocco) Ayoub El Kaabi (Wydad AC)	

== See also ==
- 2019–20 Moroccan Throne Cup
- 2020–21 Botola 2
- 2020–21 Moroccan Amateur National Championship
- 2020–21 CAF Champions League
- 2020–21 CAF Confederation Cup
- 2020–21 Moroccan Women's Championship Division One
- 2020–21 Moroccan Women's Championship Division Two
- 2019–20 Moroccan Women's Throne Cup
