= Marouane Hadhoudi =

Moroccan footballer (born 1992)

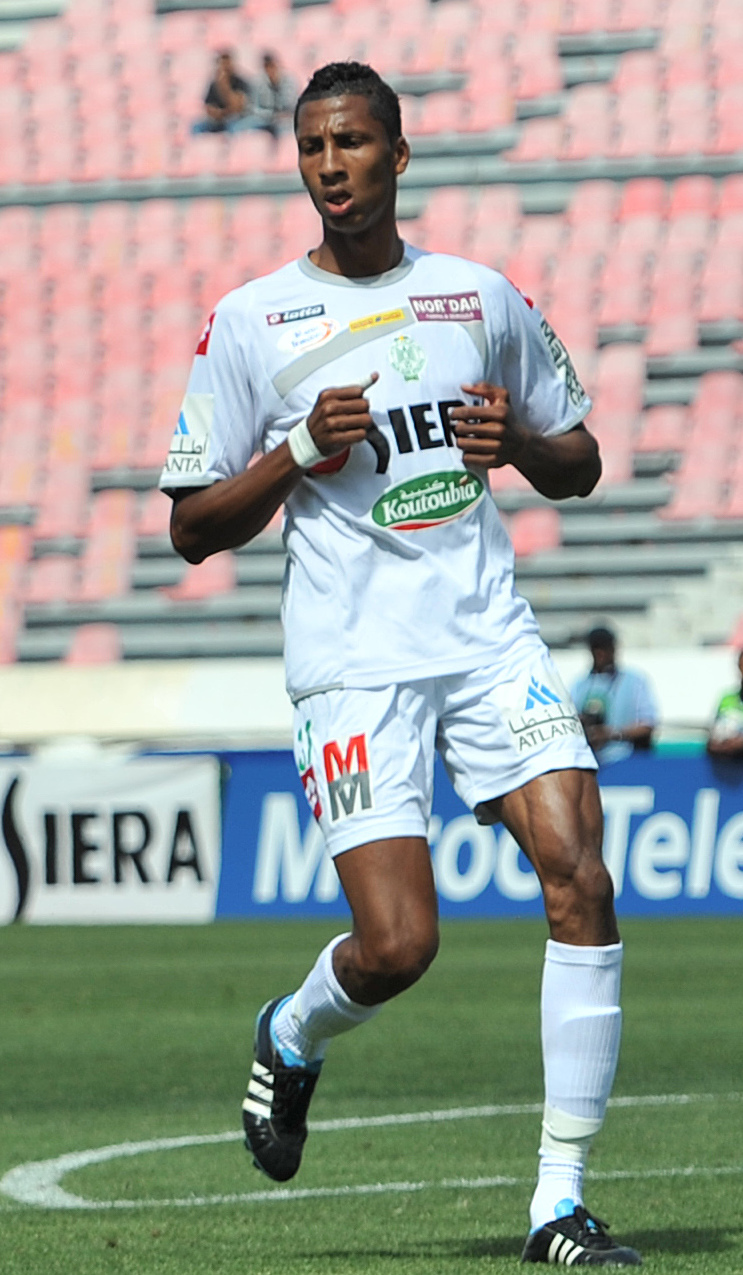
- Hadhoudi playing for Raja CA in 2012

Personal information
- Date of birth: 13 February 1992 (age 34)
- Place of birth: Casablanca, Morocco
- Height: 1.90 m (6 ft 3 in)
- Position: Centre-back

Team information
- Current team: Sabah
- Number: 24

Youth career
- 2003–2011: Raja CA

Senior career*
Years	Team	Apps	(Gls)
2011–2013	Raja CA	1	(0)
2012–2013	→ Racing AC (loan)	19	(0)
2013–2014	Chabab Rif Al Hoceima	7	(0)
2014–2015	RS Berkane	3	(0)
2015–2020	Difaâ El Jadida	122	(2)
2020–2023	Raja CA	109	(6)
2023–	Sabah	14	(0)

International career
2020–	Morocco A'	7	(0)
Medal record
Representing Morocco
African Nations Championship
Winner	2018
- * Club domestic league appearances and goals as of 26 May 2024

Marouane Hadhoudi (Arabic: مروان الهدهودي; born 13 February 1992) is a Moroccan professional footballer who plays as a centre-back for Sabah in the Azerbaijan Premier League and the Morocco national team.

== Early life ==
Marouane Hadhoudi was born on 13 February 1992 in the district of Derb Sultan, Casablanca. Being a fan of Raja Club Athletic from an early age, he used to go to Stade Mohammed V to support his favorite team. He joined the club's academy in 2003.

== Club career ==
=== Debut ===
On 29 April 2012, Hadhoudi made his senior debut against JS Massira on the end of the 2011-12 season in a 4–1 win. Next season, he joined Racing AC on a one-year loan. He left Raja CA in 2013 to join Chabab Rif Al Hoceima. He played the 2014–15 season for RS Berkane.

=== Difaâ El Jadida ===
On 18 August 2015, Difaâ Hassani El Jadidi rolled up Hadhoudi for three seasons. On 13 September, he made his debut against RS Berkane replacing Jawad El Omari at the end of the game. He started the next match against Wydad AC (2–1 defeat).

On 9 September 2016, he scored his first professional goal against Amal Souk Sabt in the first round of the 2016 Throne Cup (victory 3 -0). The Doukkali club will continue its course before being eliminated in the semi-finals against Olympique Club de Safi. On 4 December, Hadhoudi renewed his contract until the end of the 2019–20 season.

Difaâ will finish the championship in second position to secure a place in the Champions League for the second time in its history. On 21 February 2018, Hadhoudi played his first match in African competitions against Sport Bissau e Benfica in the preliminary round of the 2018 CAF Champions League (draw 0-0). On 2 September 2019, he delivered his first assist, in a 2–1 defeat to Olympique de Khouribga on week 17 of the League. On 22 February 2020, he scored his first goal in the Botola in a 1–1 draw against Ittihad Tanger following a cross from Jonathan Ifunga Ifasso.

=== Raja Club Athletic ===
On 9 September 2020, Raja announced the arrival of Marouane Hadhoudi who signed a 3-year contract. The player is a product of the club's academy before he left in 2013. On 10 December at Stade Mohammed V, he played his first game with Raja CA since his return against Rapide Oued Zem (3–2 win).

In July 2021, he achieved the 2021 CAF Confederation Cup after defeating JS Kabylie 2–1 in the final. Raja lost the 2021 CAF Super Cup against Al Ahly SC in penalties.

== International career ==
In January 2018, Hadhoudi was selected by Jamal Sellami to participate in the 2018 African Nations Championship scheduled in Morocco. The Atlas Lions will achieve a faultless course and will win the title by beating the Nigeria in the final (4–0).

== Honours ==
Raja CA

- Arab Champions League: 2020
- CAF Confederation Cup: 2021
- Botola runner-up: 2020-21, 2021-22
- CAF Super Cup runner-up: 2021

Difaâ El Jadida

- Botola runner-up: 2016-17
- Coupe du Trône runner-up: 2017

Morocco

- African Nations Championship: 2018

Individual

- Botola Team of the Season: 2020–21
