= 2019–20 Botola Pro =

Moroccan football league season

Botola
- Season: 2019–20
- Dates: 14 September 2019 – 11 October 2020
- Champions: Raja CA; 12th title
- Relegated: OC Khouribga; R Beni Mellal
- Champions League: Raja CA; Wydad AC
- Confederation Cup: RS Berkane
- Matches: 240
- Goals: 524 (2.18 per match)
- Top goalscorer: Brahim El Bahraoui (16 goals)
- Biggest home win: RCA Zemamra 5–0 RS Berkane (15 January 2020)
- Biggest away win: OC Khouribga 0–4 Wydad AC (12 November 2019); CAY Berrechid 0–4 RC Oued Zem (29 December 2019)
- Highest scoring: RC Oued Zem 5–3 IR Tanger (10 October 2020)
- Longest winning run: 4 matches DH Jadidi; RS Berkane; AS FAR; Fath US
- Longest unbeaten run: 11 matches RS Berkane
- Longest winless run: 18 matches R Beni Mellal
- Longest losing run: 7 matches R Beni Mellal
- All statistics correct as of 11 October 2020.

The 2019–20 Botola, is the 63rd season of the Premier League and the 9th under its new format of Moroccan Pro League, the top Moroccan professional league for association football clubs, since its establishment in 1956.

Wydad Casablanca came into the season as defending champions of the 2018–19 season. Nahdat Zemamra and Raja Beni Mellal entered as the two promoted teams from the 2018–19 Botola 2.

The season started on 14 September 2019, and was scheduled to end on 1 July 2020. However, the season was suspended in March 2020, due to COVID-19 pandemic in Morocco, then resumed in July and ended in 11 October 2020.

== Teams ==
=== Stadium and locations ===
Locations of the 2019–20 Botola teams

Team	Location	Stadium	Capacity
AS FAR	Rabat	Stade Moulay Abdellah	65,000
Difaâ El Jadidi	El Jadida	Stade El Abdi	15,000
Fath Union Sport	Rabat	Stade Moulay Hassan	12,000
Hassania Agadir	Agadir	Stade Adrar	45,480
IR Tanger	Tanger	Stade Ibn Batouta	45,000
Moghreb Tétouan	Tétouan	Saniat Rmel	15,000
Mouloudia Oujda	Oujda	Honneur Stadium	35,000
Nahdat Berkane	Berkane	Stade Municipal	15,000
Nahdat Zemamra	Zemamra	Stade Municipal	5,000
Olympic Safi	Safi	Stade El Massira	15,000
Olympique Khouribga	Khouribga	Complexe OCP	10,000
Raja Beni Mellal	Beni Mellal	Honneur Stadium	15,000
Raja Casablanca	Casablanca	Stade Mohamed V	67,000
Rapide Oued Zem	Oued Zem	Stade Municipal	8,000
Wydad Athletic Club	Casablanca	Stade Mohamed V	67,000
Youssoufia Berrechid	Berrechid	Stade Municipal	8,000

=== Number of teams by regions ===
	Regions of Morocco	Number of teams	Teams
1	Casablanca-Settat	5	CAY Berrechid, DH Jadidi, Raja CA, RCA Zemamra and Wydad AC
2	Béni Mellal-Khénifra	3	OC Khouribga, R Beni Mellal and RC Oued Zem
3	Oriental	2	MC Oujda and RS Berkane
3	Rabat-Salé-Kénitra	2	AS FAR and Fath US
3	Tanger-Tetouan-Al Hoceima	2	IR Tanger and MA Tétouan
6	Marrakech-Safi	1	OC Safi
6	Souss-Massa	1	HUS Agadir

=== Personnel and kits ===
Teams	Managers	Kit manufacturer	Shirt sponsor
Association sportive des FAR	(Morocco) Abderrahim Talib	Joma	
Difaâ El Jadidi	(Morocco) Jamal Amanallah	Jako	innjoo, Radio Mars, TGCC
FUS Rabat	(Morocco) Mustapha El Khalfi	Uhlsport	Emaar, Novec^{1}, LafargeHolcim^{2}
Hassania Agadir	(Morocco) Mustapha Ouchrif	Legea	Afriquia, Skoda, Souss-Massa
IR Tanger	(Spain) Juan Pedro Benali	Gloria sport	Renault, APM Terminals, Tanger-Med, ONDA, STG telecom^{2}, RCI Finance Maroc^{3}
Moghreb Tétouan	(Morocco) Jamal Drideb	Bang Sports	Halib Titawen, Al Omrane^{1}, Radio Mars^{2}
Mouloudia Oujda	(Algeria) Abdelhak Benchikha	Bang Sports	
Nahdat Berkane	(Morocco) Tarik Sektioui	Bang Sports	Souiri, Gold Vision^{1}, Afriquia^{1}
Nahdat Zemamra	(Morocco) Otmane El Assas	Bang Sports	Itqan, Igaser, Sté. du Sahel et Sahara^{1}, SomaSteel^{2}
OC Khouribga	(Morocco) Abdelaziz Kerkache	Bang Sports	OCP
Olympic Safi	(Morocco) Abdelhadi Sektioui	Bang Sports	Fitco
Raja Beni Mellal	(Morocco) Mohamed Madihi	Bang Sports	
Raja Casablanca	(Morocco) Jamal Sellami	Legea	Siera, OLA Energy, Nor'Dar, MarsaMaroc^{1}, Atlanta Assurances^{2}^{3}
Rapide Oued Zem	(Tunisia) Mounir Chebil	Bang Sports	Morih
Wydad Casablanca	(Spain) Juan Carlos Garrido	Macron	Ingelec, Or Blanc^{1}, Hyundai^{2}^{3}, Alitkane^{3}
Youssoufia Berrechid	(Morocco) Abderrahim Nejjar	Bang Sports	Dalaa, Ould Bouazza, Itqan, Tiger^{1}, Samir^{2}

1. On the back of shirt.
2. On the sleeves.
3. On the shorts.
Additionally, referee kits are made by Adidas.

=== Managerial changes ===
Teams	Outgoing manager	Manner of departure	Date of vacancy	Incoming manager	Date of appointment
Nahdat Zemamra	(Morocco) Mohamed Borji	End of contract	5 May 2019	(Morocco) Youssef Fertout	5 May 2019
AS FAR	(Spain) Carlos Alós Ferrer	Contract termination	10 June 2019	(Morocco) Abderrahim Talib	18 June 2019
Mouloudia Oujda	(Morocco) Abdelaziz Kerkache	Contract termination	11 June 2019	(Algeria) Abdelhak Benchikha	12 June 2019
Ittihad Tanger	(Morocco) Abdelouahed Belqassem	Contract termination	26 June 2019	(Algeria) Nabil Neghiz	26 June 2019
Wydad Casablanca	(Tunisia) Faouzi Benzarti	Contract termination	4 July 2019	(Serbia) Zoran Manojlovic	16 July 2019
Moghreb Tétouan	(Morocco) Tarik Sektioui	Sacked	23 July 2019	(Spain) Ángel Viadero	1 August 2019
Olympic Safi	(Morocco) Hicham Dmii	Resigned	29 July 2019	(Morocco) Mohamed Guisser	31 July 2019
Nahdat Berkane	(Morocco) Mounir Jaouani	Sacked	2 September 2019	(Morocco) Tarik Sektioui	19 September 2019
Rapide Oued Zem	(Morocco) Hassan Benabicha	Contract termination	26 October 2019	(Tunisia) Mounir Chebil	14 November 2019
Ittihad Tanger	(Algeria) Nabil Neghiz	Contract termination	26 October 2019	(Morocco) Abdelouahed Belqassem (interim)	26 October 2019
Raja Casablanca	(France) Patrice Carteron	Sacked	11 November 2019	(Morocco) Jamal Sellami	11 November 2019
Ittihad Tanger	(Morocco) Abdelouahed Belqassem (interim)	End of tenure as caretaker	19 November 2019	(Morocco) Hicham Dmii	19 November 2019
Hassania Agadir	(Argentina) Miguel Ángel Gamondi	Sacked	20 November 2019	(Morocco) Mohamed Fakhir	20 November 2019
Raja Beni Mellal	(Morocco) Mourad Fellah	Contract termination	26 November 2019	(Morocco) Aziz El Amri	30 November 2019
OC Khouribga	(Morocco) Rachid Taoussi	Resigned	29 November 2019	(Tunisia) Ahmad Al-Ajlani	19 December 2019
Nahdat Zemamra	(Morocco) Youssef Fertout	Sacked	16 December 2019	(Morocco) Mohamed Borji (interim)	16 December 2019
Difaâ El Jadidi	(Morocco) Ezzaki Badou	Contract termination	23 December 2019	(Algeria) Abdelkader Amrani	28 December 2019
Youssoufia Berrechid	(Morocco) Said Sediki	Contract termination	31 December 2019	(Tunisia) Ferid Chouchane	3 January 2020
Nahdat Zemamra	(Morocco) Mohamed Borji (interim)	End of tenure as caretaker	1 January 2020	(Morocco) Saïd Chiba	1 January 2020
Raja Beni Mellal	(Morocco) Aziz El Amri	Contract termination	10 January 2020	(Morocco) Mohamed Madihi	10 January 2020
Wydad Casablanca	(Serbia) Zoran Manojlovic	Contract termination	13 January 2020	(France) Sébastien Desabre	21 January 2020
Hassania Agadir	(Morocco) Mohamed Fakhir	Sacked	21 January 2020	(Morocco) Mustapha Ouchrif	31 January 2020
FUS Rabat	(Morocco) Walid Regragui	Contract termination	22 January 2020	(Morocco) Mustapha El Khalfi	22 January 2020
IR Tanger	(Morocco) Hicham Dmii	Contract termination	26 January 2020	(Spain) Juan Pedro Benali	26 January 2020
Wydad Casablanca	(France) Sébastien Desabre	Contract termination	25 February 2020	(Spain) Juan Carlos Garrido	25 February 2020
Moghreb Tétouan	(Spain) Ángel Viadero	Sacked	27 February 2020	(Morocco) Jamal Drideb	28 February 2020
Olympic Safi	(Morocco) Mohamed Guisser	Contract termination	3 March 2020	(Morocco) Abdelhadi Sektioui	7 March 2020
Youssoufia Berrechid	(Tunisia) Ferid Chouchane	Resigned	6 March 2020	(Morocco) Omar Azmani	6 March 2020
Difaâ El Jadidi	(Algeria) Abdelkader Amrani	Contract termination	19 May 2020	(Morocco) Jamal Amanallah	19 May 2020
Youssoufia Berrechid	(Morocco) Omar Azmani	Sacked	20 August 2020	(Morocco) Abderrahim Nejjar	20 August 2020
OC Khouribga	(Tunisia) Ahmad Al-Ajlani	Resigned	27 August 2020	(Morocco) Abdelaziz Kerkache	27 August 2020
Nahdat Zemamra	(Morocco) Saïd Chiba	Sacked	22 September 2020	(Morocco) Otmane El Assas (interim)	23 September 2020

== League table ==
Pos	Team	Pld	W	D	L	GF	GA	GD	Pts	Qualification or relegation
1	Raja Casablanca (C, Q)	30	17	9	4	43	23	+20	60	Qualification for Champions League
2	Wydad Casablanca (Q)	30	17	8	5	52	28	+24	59	Qualification for Champions League
3	RS Berkane (Q)	30	15	12	3	35	23	+12	57	Qualification for Confederation Cup
4	FUS Rabat	30	13	10	7	39	30	+9	49	
5	Mouloudia Oujda	30	12	12	6	35	28	+7	48	
6	AS FAR	30	12	9	9	45	34	+11	45	
7	Moghreb Tétouan	30	10	10	10	30	27	+3	40	
8	Hassania Agadir	30	9	9	12	34	38	−4	36 (Note: Head-to-head: Hassania Agadir: 8 points, Rapide Oued Zem 5 points, Youssoufia Berrechid 2 points.)	
9	Rapide Oued Zem	30	9	9	12	30	30	0	36	
10	Youssoufia Berrechid	30	10	6	14	33	44	−11	36	
11	Difaâ El Jadidi	30	8	11	11	26	28	−2	35	
12	Nahdat Zemamra	30	8	10	12	40	41	−1	34	
13	Olympic Safi	30	6	15	9	25	34	−9	33	
14	IR Tanger	30	7	11	12	20	36	−16	32	
15	Olympique Khouribga (R)	30	6	10	14	24	38	−14	28	Relegation to Botola 2
16	Raja Beni Mellal (R)	30	1	9	20	13	42	−29	12	Relegation to Botola 2

Updated to match(es) played on 11 October 2020. Source: frmf.ma
Rules for classification: 1) Points; 2) Head-to-head points; 3) Head-to-head goal difference; 4) Goal difference; 5) Goals scored; 6) Fair-play points; 7) Play-off.
(C) Champions; (Q) Qualified for the phase indicated; (R) Relegated

== Results ==
Home \ Away	CAYB	DHJ	FAR	FUS	HUSA	IRT	MAT	MCO	OCK	OCS	RBM	RCA	RCAZ	RCOZ	RSB	WAC
CAY Berrechid	—	1–0	2–4	1–1	3–1	3–0	1–1	1–1	1–0	1–0	2–0	3–2	1–2	0–4	0–0	3–2
DH Jadidi	2–1	—	1–1	1–2	1–2	1–1	2–0	0–0	1–0	1–1	1–0	0–0	2–1	1–1	0–0	0–1
AS FAR	0–1	1–3	—	1–2	1–1	4–1	2–1	1–1	1–1	0–0	1–0	1–0	5–2	2–0	0–1	1–1
Fath US	1–0	2–1	2–4	—	1–0	1–0	1–0	2–1	1–0	5–2	1–1	0–1	1–1	3–1	1–1	1–2
HUS Agadir	2–0	2–1	2–1	2–1	—	2–1	1–1	0–1	1–2	2–2	1–0	0–2	1–1	0–1	0–1	1–1
IR Tanger	2–0	0–0	1–1	2–1	0–0	—	1–0	0–0	1–1	1–2	1–0	1–4	0–0	0–0	1–1	0–2
MA Tétouan	2–0	2–1	2–0	1–0	1–2	0–0	—	4–0	2–1	1–1	0–0	0–0	1–0	1–0	0–0	1–1
MC Oujda	3–1	1–1	0–2	2–1	2–1	1–0	1–0	—	3–0	1–0	1–1	2–2	2–1	1–0	0–1	1–1
OC Khouribga	4–1	1–0	0–1	1–1	0–0	0–1	2–2	1–4	—	1–1	1–0	1–2	1–0	0–0	0–1	0–4
OC Safi	1–0	1–0	1–1	0–0	2–0	0–0	0–0	2–2	1–1	—	1–0	0–0	1–3	1–0	0–1	1–2
R Beni Mellal	0–2	0–0	0–3	2–2	1–3	0–1	0–2	1–2	0–0	0–0	—	1–2	2–2	1–0	0–1	1–2
Raja CA	2–0	3–1	2–1	0–2	2–1	0–1	1–0	1–1	2–1	2–0	2–0	—	3–1	1–0	2–2	1–0
RCA Zemamra	3–2	1–2	1–2	1–1	2–2	1–0	1–2	1–0	0–0	1–1	1–1	1–2	—	2–0	5–0	1–2
RC Oued Zem	0–0	1–0	2–2	0–0	2–1	5–3	2–1	0–0	0–1	3–1	3–1	0–0	2–1	—	0–0	1–2
RS Berkane	1–1	1–1	2–1	0–1	1–1	2–0	4–1	1–0	3–1	1–1	1–0	2–2	1–2	2–1	—	2–1
Wydad AC	3–1	0–1	1–0	1–1	3–2	4–0	2–1	1–1	3–2	4–1	3–0	0–0	1–1	2–1	0–1	—

Updated to match(es) played on 11 October 2020. Source: Goalzz
Legend: Blue = home team win; Yellow = draw; Red = away team win.
For upcoming matches, an "a" indicates there is an article about the rivalry between the two participants.

== Season statistics ==
=== Top goalscorers ===
As of 11 October 2020

Rank	Player	Club	Goals
1	(Morocco) Brahim El Bahraoui	RC Oued Zem	16
2	(Morocco) Noah Sadaoui	MC Oujda	12
2	(Morocco) Karim El Berkaoui	HUS Agadir	12
4	(Ivory Coast) Joseph Guédé Gnadou	AS FAR	10
4	(Morocco) Soufiane Rahimi	Raja CA	10
4	(Morocco) Reda Hajhouj	OC Khouribga	10
4	(Morocco) Mohamed Aziz	RS Berkane	10
4	(Morocco) Abdessamad El Mobarky	RCA Zemamra	10
9	(Morocco) Hamid Ahaddad	Raja CA	9
9	(Cameroon) Jean Joseph Kombous	Fath US	9

=== Hat-tricks ===
Player	For	Against	Result	Date	Round
(Morocco) Ismail Khafi	MC Oujda	OC Khouribga	4–1 (A)	29 November 2019	8
(Morocco) Reda Hajhouj	OC Khouribga	CAY Berrechid	4–1 (H)	21 December 2019	10
(Morocco) Mohamed Aziz	RS Berkane	OC Khouribga	3–1 (H)	2 January 2020	9
(Morocco) Brahim El Bahraoui^{4}	RC Oued Zem	IR Tanger	5–3 (H)	10 October 2020	30

(H) – Home; (A) – Away
^{4} – Player scored four goals.

== Attendances ==
No.	Club	Average
1	Wydad	25,305
2	Raja	20,000
3	MC Oujda	19,486
4	AS FAR	17,000
5	IRT	11,944
6	MAT	8,750
7	Safi	7,250
8	HUSA	6,714
9	Khouribga	6,438
10	Renaissance de Berkane	6,438
11	Rapide Oued Zem	5,063
12	Difaâ El-Jadida	4,714
13	RCA Zemamra	4,500
14	Youssoufia Berrechid	3,625
15	FUS	2,400
16	Raja Beni Mellal	2,281

Note: As of December 2019, Raja and Wydad were already the Botola clubs with the highest average home attendances.

== See also ==
- 2019 Moroccan Throne Cup
- 2019–20 Botola 2
- 2019-20 CAF Champions League
- 2019-20 CAF Confederation Cup
- 2019–20 Arab Club Champions Cup
- Royal Moroccan Football Federation
