= 2020–21 Moroccan Amateur National Championship =

Moroccan football league championship

Amateur National
- Season: 2020–21

The 2020–21 Amateur National Championship is for 3 divisions of the Moroccan football league. Those championships are managed by the LNFA "Ligue nationale du football amateur".

== National ==
National
- Season: 2020–21

=== League table ===
Pos	Team	Pld	W	D	L	GF	GA	GD	Pts	Qualification or relegation
1	USM Oujda (C, P)	0	0	0	0	0	0	0	0	Promoted to Botola Pro 2
2	JS Massira (P)	0	0	0	0	0	0	0	0	Promoted to Botola Pro 2
3	FR Nador	0	0	0	0	0	0	0	0	
4	COD Meknès	0	0	0	0	0	0	0	0	
5	Wydad Serghini	0	0	0	0	0	0	0	0	
6	AS Mansouria	0	0	0	0	0	0	0	0	
7	US Sidi Kacem	0	0	0	0	0	0	0	0	
8	CSM Ouarzazate	0	0	0	0	0	0	0	0	
9	CM Dakhla	0	0	0	0	0	0	0	0	
10	JS Kasba Tadla	0	0	0	0	0	0	0	0	
11	US Témara	0	0	0	0	0	0	0	0	
12	Rachad Bernoussi	0	0	0	0	0	0	0	0	
13	OC Youssoufia	0	0	0	0	0	0	0	0	
14	Chabab M'rirt	0	0	0	0	0	0	0	0	
15	CSH Tarrast (R)	0	0	0	0	0	0	0	0	Relegation to Amateurs I
16	CR Al-Hoceima (Note: 1 Point deduction.) (R)	0	0	0	0	0	0	0	−1	Relegation to Amateurs I

Updated to match(es) played on unknown. Source: LNFA
Rules for classification: 1) Points; 2a) Head-to-head goal difference if they are two teams with equal points; 2b) Goal difference if they are more than two teams with equal points; 3) Number of wins; 4) Goals scored; 5) Play-off between involved teams.
(C) Champions; (P) Promoted; (R) Relegated

== Amateurs I ==
Amateurs I North
- Season: 2020-21

=== League table ===
Pos	Team	Pld	W	D	L	GF	GA	GD	Pts	Qualification or relegation
1	FUS Rabat U23 (C, P)	30	15	8	7	46	43	+3	53	Promoted to Amateur Division Nationale
2	Nasma Sportif Settat	30	14	9	7	40	25	+15	51	
3	Fath Wislan Meknes	30	13	9	8	34	25	+9	48	
4	Amal Belksiri	30	13	8	9	49	32	+17	47	
5	Étoile de Casablanca	30	11	13	6	42	35	+7	46	
6	Union Salé	30	10	13	7	36	30	+6	43	
7	Wafa Sportif Driouch	30	11	10	9	33	28	+5	43	
8	Hassania Lazari Oujda	30	12	7	11	33	31	+2	43	
9	Wafaa Fez	30	8	13	9	37	42	−5	37	
10	ASO Formation Professionnelle	30	8	12	10	26	25	+1	36	
11	Fath Casablanca	30	7	14	9	33	35	−2	35	
12	Mouloudia Missour	30	9	8	13	45	48	−3	35	
13	Hassania Benslimane	30	8	11	11	30	38	−8	35	
14	Difâa Hamrya de Khénifra	30	8	8	14	28	41	−13	32	
15	Renaissance Martil (R)	30	6	11	13	30	44	−14	29	Relegation to Amateur Division II
16	Wydad Sefrou (R)	30	6	8	16	31	51	−20	26	Relegation to Amateur Division II

Updated to match(es) played on 4 July 2021. Source: LNFA
Rules for classification: 1) Points; 2a) Head-to-head goal difference if they are two teams with equal points; 2b) Goal difference if they are more than two teams with equal points; 3) Number of wins; 4) Goals scored; 5) Play-off between involved teams.
(C) Champions; (P) Promoted; (R) Relegated

Amateurs I South
- Season: 2020-21

=== League table ===
Pos	Team	Pld	W	D	L	GF	GA	GD	Pts	Qualification or relegation
1	Ittifaq Marrakech	30	18	6	6	42	21	+21	60	Promoted to Amateur Division Nationale
2	Mouloudia Assa	30	17	8	5	39	18	+21	59	
3	Olympique Marrakech	30	14	10	6	41	26	+15	52	
4	Najah Souss Agadir	30	12	10	8	49	31	+18	46	
5	Union Aït Melloul	30	11	12	7	38	25	+13	45	
6	Amal Souk Sebt	30	13	5	12	37	30	+7	44	
7	Chabab Houara	30	10	12	8	32	28	+4	42	
8	AJS Boujdour	30	11	9	10	29	30	−1	42	
9	Nojom Awsred	30	9	12	9	42	45	−3	39	
10	Mouloudia Laayoune	30	11	6	13	35	40	−5	39	
11	Adrar Souss	30	9	11	10	26	26	0	38	
12	Mouloudia Tarfaya	30	9	9	12	31	32	−1	36	
13	Mouloudia de Marrakech	30	10	6	14	30	40	−10	36	
14	Rajaa Agadir	30	8	11	11	35	45	−10	35	
15	Olympique Phosboucraa (R)	30	6	4	20	18	56	−38	22	Relegation to Amateur Division II
16	Club Municipal Laayoune (R)	30	3	7	20	19	50	−31	16	Relegation to Amateur Division II

Updated to match(es) played on 10 July 2021. Source: LNFA
Rules for classification: 1) Points; 2a) Head-to-head goal difference if they are two teams with equal points; 2b) Goal difference if they are more than two teams with equal points; 3) Number of wins; 4) Goals scored; 5) Play-off between involved teams.
(R) Relegated

== Amateurs II ==
Amateurs II Northeast
- Season: 2020-21

=== League table ===
Pos	Team	Pld	W	D	L	GF	GA	GD	Pts	Qualification or relegation
1	Qods Taza (C, P)	30	20	5	5	51	28	+23	65	Promoted to Amateur Division I
2	Club Sportif Fnideq	30	14	11	5	42	27	+15	53	
3	Renaissance Zaio	30	14	10	6	45	26	+19	52	
4	Amal Aroui	30	13	7	10	37	26	+11	46	
5	Tihad Chaouen	30	13	7	10	37	34	+3	46	
6	Ajax Tanger	30	12	5	13	46	45	+1	41	
7	Chabab Kawakeb Fes	30	10	9	11	38	42	−4	39	
8	Chabab Larache	30	10	9	11	31	31	0	39	
9	Club Riyadi Ifran	30	10	8	12	35	39	−4	38	
10	Chabab Seloun	30	9	11	10	27	32	−5	38	
11	Hassania Guercif	30	9	9	12	38	43	−5	36	
12	Club de Kasr Lakbir	30	8	10	12	32	37	−5	34	
13	Club Toulal	30	7	13	10	30	36	−6	34	
14	Union Sportif Taounat	30	8	9	13	34	37	−3	33	
15	Amal Sidi Hrazem	30	9	3	18	26	48	−22	30	Relegation to Regional Leagues
16	Club Sportif Azrou	30	7	8	15	32	50	−18	29	Relegation to Regional Leagues

Updated to match(es) played on 4 July 2021. Source: LNFA
Rules for classification: 1) Points; 2a) Head-to-head goal difference if they are two teams with equal points; 2b) Goal difference if they are more than two teams with equal points; 3) Number of wins; 4) Goals scored; 5) Play-off between involved teams.
(C) Champions; (P) Promoted

Amateurs II Northwest
- Season: 2020-21

=== League table ===
Pos	Team	Pld	W	D	L	GF	GA	GD	Pts	Qualification or relegation
1	Union Yacoub el Mansour (C, P)	30	21	3	6	49	22	+27	66	Promoted to Amateur Division I
2	Raja Casablanca U23	30	17	4	9	46	30	+16	55	
3	Wafaa Wydad Casablanca	30	14	12	4	35	19	+16	54	
4	Youssoufia Rabat	30	15	5	10	52	38	+14	50	
5	Chabab Hassani	30	12	10	8	43	34	+9	46	
6	Renaissance El Gara	30	12	7	11	36	38	−2	43	
7	Association Shabab Almostoqbal	29	12	7	10	30	28	+2	43	
8	FAR U23	29	11	9	9	35	30	+5	42	
9	AWF Oulad Ziane	30	10	10	10	33	32	+1	40	
10	Amal Sidi Rahal	30	11	6	13	29	37	−8	39	
11	Renaissance Settat	30	11	6	13	25	30	−5	39	
12	USD Meknes	30	10	6	14	30	32	−2	36	
13	SCC Roches Noires Casablanca	30	8	10	12	33	32	+1	34	
14	US Sidi Maarouf	30	9	3	18	21	47	−26	30	
15	FC Casablanca	30	6	8	16	30	46	−16	26	Relegation to Regional Leagues
16	MAS Fez U23 (R)	30	5	4	21	20	52	−32	19	Relegation to Regional Leagues

Updated to match(es) played on 4 July 2021. Source: LNFA
Rules for classification: 1) Points; 2a) Head-to-head goal difference if they are two teams with equal points; 2b) Goal difference if they are more than two teams with equal points; 3) Number of wins; 4) Goals scored; 5) Play-off between involved teams.
(C) Champions; (P) Promoted; (R) Relegated

Amateurs II South
- Season: 2020-21

=== League table ===
Pos	Team	Pld	W	D	L	GF	GA	GD	Pts	Qualification or relegation
1	US Amal Tiznit (C, P)	29	17	11	1	54	21	+33	62	Promoted to Amateur Division I
2	Mouloudia Jorf	29	16	5	8	51	38	+13	53	
3	US Bejaâd	29	13	10	6	43	27	+16	49	
4	Union Azilal	29	13	9	7	25	20	+5	48	
5	Kasbat Mzar	29	13	9	7	32	23	+9	48	
6	Ittihad Fkih Ben Salah	29	12	8	9	32	26	+6	44	
7	Fath Sidi Bennour	29	12	6	11	34	28	+6	42	
8	Raja Ben Guerir	29	11	7	11	36	34	+2	40	
9	Najm Anza	29	10	7	12	32	35	−3	37	
10	Wifak Safi	29	10	6	13	27	41	−14	36	
11	CS Kasbah Tamlalt	29	7	14	8	39	42	−3	35	
12	Fath Inezgane	29	7	12	10	32	29	+3	33	
13	Union Taroudant	29	8	6	15	31	48	−17	30	
14	DHJ U23	29	6	11	12	21	22	−1	29	
15	CS Sidi Smail (R)	29	6	5	18	32	54	−22	23	Relegation to Regional Leagues
16	Chabab Tata (R)	29	5	6	18	30	63	−33	21	Relegation to Regional Leagues

Updated to match(es) played on 30 June 2021. Source: LNFA
Rules for classification: 1) Points; 2) Head-to-head points; 3) Head-to-head goal difference; 4) Goal difference; 5) Goals scored; 6) Fair-play points; 7) Play-off.
(C) Champions; (P) Promoted; (R) Relegated

Amateurs II Sahara
- Season: 2020-21

=== League table ===
Pos	Team	Pld	W	D	L	GF	GA	GD	Pts	Qualification or relegation
1	Mostaqbal El Marsa	25	13	6	6	38	19	+19	45	Promoted to Amateur Division I
2	Club el Argoub Dakhla	25	12	7	6	27	15	+12	43	
3	Union Assa Zag	25	11	8	6	24	17	+7	41	
4	Chabab Akhfennir	25	11	7	7	28	25	+3	40	
5	Najma Tarfaya	25	10	9	6	32	25	+7	39	
6	Majd Laayoune	25	9	10	6	28	28	0	37	
7	Chabab Saguia el-Hamra	25	8	10	7	27	25	+2	34	
8	CF Foum el Oued	25	8	9	8	22	22	0	33	
9	Hawzat Smara	25	7	10	8	32	30	+2	31	
10	Nahdat Tan-Tan	25	8	6	11	25	28	−3	30	
11	Mouloudia Naïla	25	8	6	11	29	37	−8	30	
12	Jawhara Guelmim	25	7	6	12	25	28	−3	27	
13	Rachad Laayoune	25	6	9	10	19	29	−10	27	
14	Club Municipal El Ouatia (R)	25	2	7	16	18	46	−28	13	Relegation to Regional Leagues

Updated to match(es) played on 30 June 2021. Source: LNFA
Rules for classification: 1) Points; 2) Head-to-head points; 3) Head-to-head goal difference; 4) Goal difference; 5) Goals scored; 6) Fair-play points; 7) Play-off.
(R) Relegated

== See also ==
- 2020–21 Botola
- 2020–21 Botola 2
