= Robert Moreno =

Spanish football manager

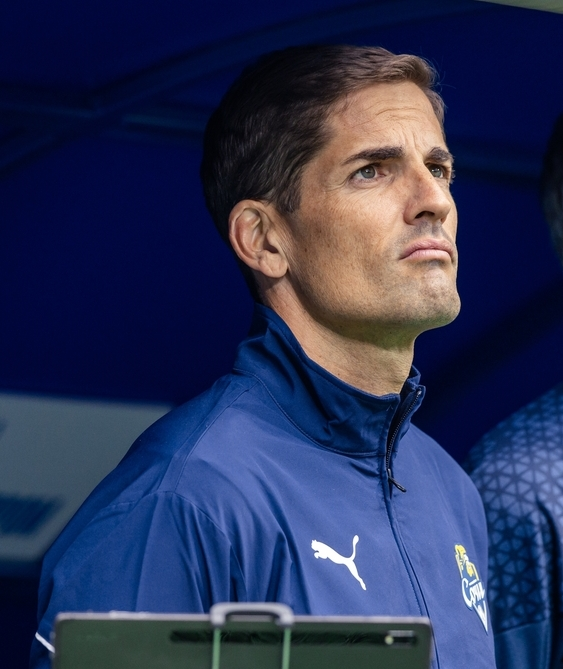
- Moreno as manager of Sochi in 2024

Personal information
- Full name: Robert Moreno González
- Date of birth: 19 September 1977 (age 49)
- Place of birth: L'Hospitalet de Llobregat, Spain

Team information
- Current team: South Korea (caretaker)

Youth career
- Years: Team
- Tecla Sala

Managerial career
- 2003–2004: PB Collblanc
- 2006–2007: Castelldefels
- 2007–2008: Damm
- 2019: Spain
- 2019–2020: Monaco
- 2021–2022: Granada
- 2023–2025: Sochi
- 2026–: South Korea (caretaker)

Robert Moreno González (born 19 September 1977) is a Spanish football manager. He currently is the interim manager of the South Korea national football team.

He worked in youth and amateur football before becoming assistant to Luis Enrique at various clubs and the Spain national team. In 2019, Moreno succeeded his mentor as manager of the national team and qualified for UEFA Euro 2020 before Luis Enrique returned to his post. He later managed Monaco in Ligue 1, Granada in La Liga, and Sochi in the Russian Premier League.

== Coaching career ==
=== Early career ===
Born in L'Hospitalet de Llobregat, Barcelona, Catalonia, Moreno played as a central defender for his hometown side, La Florida CF. He started developing interest for coaching at the age of just 14, when his physical education teacher asked him to help in classes. At the age of 16, he started managing La Florida's Alevín squad, along with Antonio Camacho.

Moreno started his professional coaching career in 2003, after being the youngest to receive the title of manager in the country, when he took charge of Penya Blaugrana Collblanc. From there he went to L'Hospitalet, Marianao Poblet, Castelldefels and Damm, managing their youth sides. In 2006, he also took over Castelldefels' first team, but was sacked in March of the following year.

After working as a scout for Barcelona during the 2010–11 season, Moreno worked as assistant manager under Luis Enrique at Roma (2011–2012), Celta (2013–2014) and Barcelona (2014–2017). For the 2017–18 season, he assisted Juan Carlos Unzué at Celta, prior to rejoining Luis Enrique for the Spain national team in July 2018.

=== Spain national team ===
On 26 March 2019, Moreno was in charge of the national team in a 2–0 win against Malta after Luis Enrique had to leave due to personal problems. He was also in charge during the following two matches, against the Faroe Islands and Sweden.

After three matches in charge of Spain on an interim basis, Moreno was appointed the team's head coach on 19 June 2019, after Luis Enrique's resignation due to his daughter's illness. He signed a contract until the end of UEFA Euro 2020. Only five months later, Moreno resigned and was replaced by his predecessor Luis Enrique despite an unbeaten record and qualifying for UEFA Euro 2020. Luis Enrique dismissed Moreno from his coaching staff and called him "disloyal" and "over ambitious" for wanting to manage Spain at Euro 2020.

=== Monaco ===
On 28 December 2019, Moreno was named as the new manager of Ligue 1 side Monaco, replacing Leonardo Jardim. A week later, he won his first match 2–1 at home to Reims in the last 64 of the Coupe de France. On 12 January, in his first league match, the team from the principality drew 3–3 at leaders Paris Saint-Germain.

Having finished the season in ninth place, and thus missing out on European qualification, Moreno was sacked on 18 July 2020.

=== Granada ===
On 18 June 2021, La Liga club Granada announced Moreno as the side's new head coach on a two-year contract. He drew 0–0 at Villarreal on his debut on 16 August.

On 6 March 2022, Moreno was sacked by the Andalusians, after six defeats in the last seven matches.

=== Sochi ===
On 15 December 2023, Moreno was hired by the Russian Premier League club Sochi. The club was at the bottom of the table at the time. Despite the results improving somewhat under Moreno's helm, Sochi was relegated on 18 May 2024.

On 27 May 2024, Sochi and Moreno extended their contract for three additional seasons. On 31 May 2025, Sochi won the promotion play-offs 4–3 on aggregate against Pari Nizhny Novgorod and was promoted back to the Russian Premier League. However, Moreno did not manage Sochi in the second leg of the play-offs after losing the first leg with the score of 1–2 at home. He did not arrive to the second-leg game "for family reasons", according to the club, leading to the speculation that he had been fired. On 12 June 2025, Moreno stated that he would return to Sochi to prepare the team for its return to the Premier League.

On 2 September 2025, Moreno left Sochi by mutual consent after the club only gained 1 point in the first 7 games upon their return into the top tier. Former general director of the club Andrei Orlov alleged that Moreno used ChatGPT to prepare for matches; Moreno maintained that he only used the software for translation.

=== South Korea National Team ===
On 1 September 2026, Moreno was appointed as the interim manager of South Korea, with a short-term contract that includes through six international matches scheduled until the 27th of November.

== Managerial statistics ==
As of match played 17 November 2026

Managerial record by team and tenure
Team	Nat	From	To	Record								Ref
Team	Nat	From	To	G	W	D	L	GF	GA	GD	Win %	Ref
Spain	(Spain)	26 March 2019	19 November 2019	9	7	2	0	29	4	+25	77.78	
Monaco	(France)	28 December 2019	19 July 2020	13	5	3	5	18	21	−3	38.46	
Granada	(Spain)	18 June 2021	6 March 2022	29	6	10	13	35	44	−9	20.69	
Sochi	(Russia)	15 December 2023	31 August 2025	62	21	21	20	98	83	+15	33.87	
South Korea	(South Korea)	1 September 2026	Present	6	3	1	2	9	7	+2	50.00	
Total				119	42	37	40	189	159	+30	35.29	—
