= Àlex Cano =

Spanish footballer

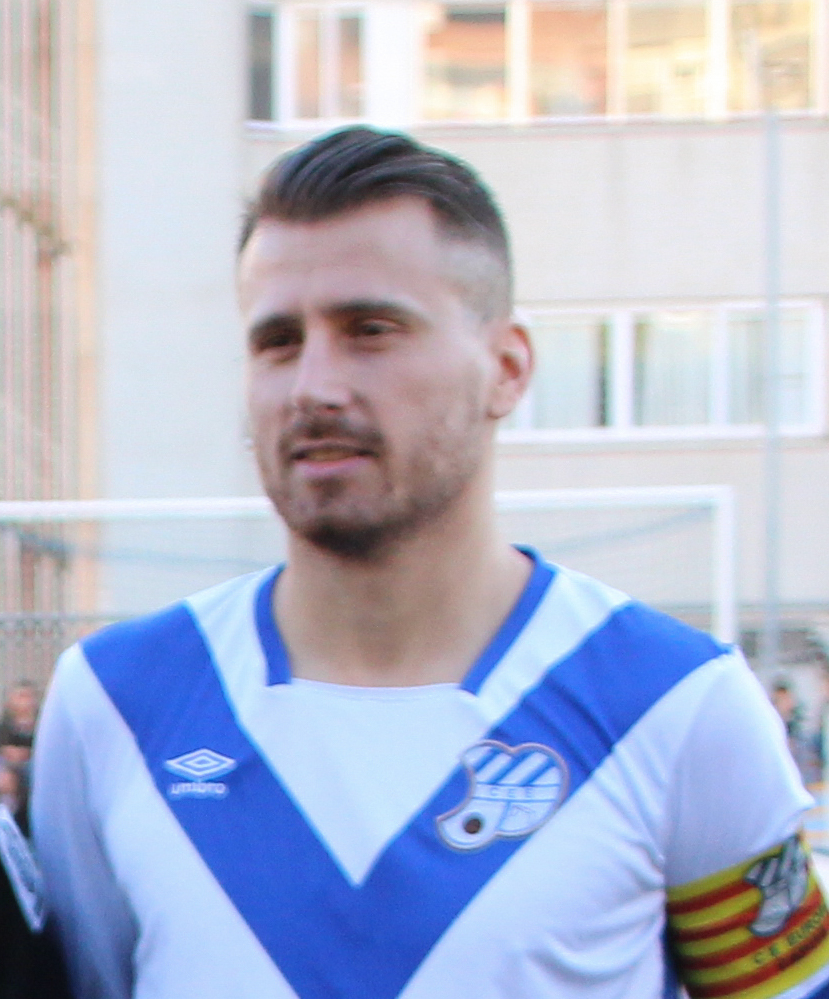
- Cano as a Europa player in 2020

Personal information
- Full name: Alejandro Cano Jiménez
- Date of birth: 7 March 1988 (age 38)
- Place of birth: Barcelona, Spain
- Height: 1.84 m (6 ft 0 in)
- Position: Centre-back

Team information
- Current team: Europa
- Number: 4

Youth career
- Barcelona
- Hospitalet
- 2005–2007: Cornellà

Senior career*
Years	Team	Apps	(Gls)
2007–2008	Cornellà		
2008–2009	Marianao Poblet		
2009–	Europa	484	(66)

International career^{‡}
2025–	Catalonia	1	(0)
- * Club domestic league appearances and goals as of 25 May 2026 ‡ National team caps and goals as of 18 November 2025

Alejandro "Àlex" Cano Jiménez (born 7 March 1988) is a Spanish professional footballer who plays as a centre-back for CE Europa, which he captains. He is also the highest appearance-maker of the club's history.

== Club career ==
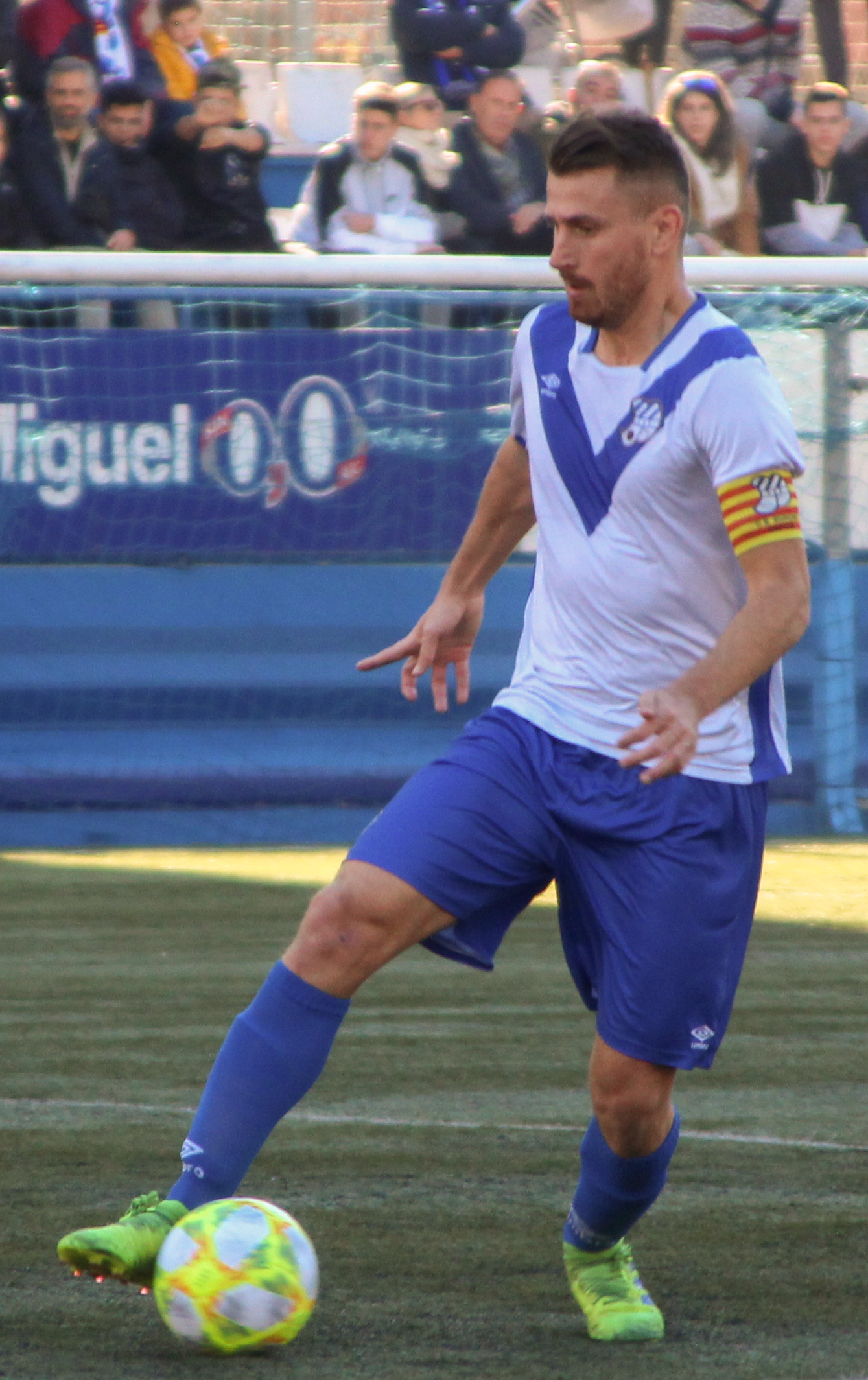
Cano playing for Europa in 2020

Born in Barcelona, Catalonia, Cano played for FC Barcelona, CE L'Hospitalet and UE Cornellà as a youth, making his senior debut with the latter in 2007, in Primera Catalana. In January 2008, he moved to CD Marianao Poblet, before signing for CE Europa in July 2009.

At Europa, Cano subsequently became a first-choice, and was appointed team captain in October 2013. He helped the club to win the Copa Catalunya in 2015, and reached 400 matches for them on 7 February 2022.

On 13 March 2022, Cano reached 403 matches with the shirt of the Escapulats, becoming their highest-ever appearance maker. On 17 March 2025, he reached 500 official matches with the club, and finished the season with eight goals in 30 appearances overall as the club achieved promotion to Primera Federación.

== International career ==
On 14 November 2025, Cano and his brother were called up to the Catalonia national team for a friendly against Palestine. He made his international debut four days later, playing the entire second half in the 2–1 win at the Estadi Olímpic Lluís Companys.

== Personal life ==
Cano comes from a family of footballers: his younger brothers Carlos and Jordi are also footballers, with the former being a forward and the latter being a winger. Àlex and Jordi play together at Europa, and Àlex faced both his brothers (at the time at Prat) in September 2017, in a match where all three brothers scored.

== Honours ==
Europa

- Copa Catalunya: 2015
