= Toni Cosano =

Spanish football manager

Personal information
- Full name: António Cosano Cantos
- Date of birth: 28 March 1977 (age 49)
- Place of birth: L'Hospitalet de Llobregat, Spain

Managerial career
- Years: Team
- 1999–2003: Hospitalet (youth)
- 2003–2005: Santa Eulàlia (youth)
- 2005–2006: Espanyol (youth)
- 2006–2007: Hospitalet (youth)
- 2007–2008: Sant Andreu (youth)
- 2009–2011: Europa (youth)
- 2011–2013: Mataró (youth)
- 2014–2016: Marianao Poblet
- 2017–2018: Petro de Luanda (youth)
- 2019–2021: Petro de Luanda
- 2021: Moghreb Tétouan

António "Toni" Cosano Cantos (born 28 March 1977) is a Spanish football manager.

== Career ==
Cosano started his managerial career with the youth academy of Spanish fifth division side ACF Santa Eulàlia. After that, he was appointed scout of Espanyol in the Spanish La Liga. After that, Cosano was appointed manager of Spanish sixth division club Marianao Poblet. In 2013, he was almost appointed youth manager of FC KHT in South Korea. In 2019, Cosano was appointed manager of Angolan team Petro de Luanda, where he said, "there are people who pay a man to do a ritual in which he assures him that he is going to score a goal. I know of footballers who have gone bankrupt going from healer to healer. Some assure them that they will not be injured if they are paid periodically. It is dirty and shabby, I know of players who do not go to the doctor or the physiotherapist. And if they go, it is because the club forces them. They go to the healer to recover."

In July 2021, he was appointed manager of MAT in Morocco, and got sacked in September 2021 after the bad results at the start of the 2021-2022 Botola 2 season.
