= Ivan Zhekiu =

Ukrainian footballer (born 1957)

Personal information
- Full name: Ivan Hryhorovych Zhekiu
- Date of birth: January 19, 1957 (age 69)
- Place of birth: Biliaivka, Ukrainian SSR
- Height: 1.76 m (5 ft 9 in)
- Position: Goalkeeper

Senior career*
Years	Team	Apps	(Gls)
1975–1981	Chornomorets Odesa	97	(0)
1982–1983	SC Odesa	81	(0)
1984–1986	Dinamo Minsk	90	(0)
1987–1989	Chornomorets Odesa	23	(0)
1990–1995	Difaâ Hassani El Jadidi		
- * Club domestic league appearances and goals

Ivan Hryhorovych Zhekiu (Ukrainian: Іван Григорович Жекю; born 19 January 1957) is a Soviet and Ukrainian former footballer who played as a goalkeeper.

== Early life ==
Zhekiu is a native of Odesa, Ukraine.

== Career ==
Zhekiu played for Belarusian side FC Dinamo Minsk, where he played in the UEFA Cup.

== Personal life ==
After retiring from professional football, Zhekiu lived in Minsk, Belarus.
