= Yassine El Ouatki =

French footballer (born 1998)

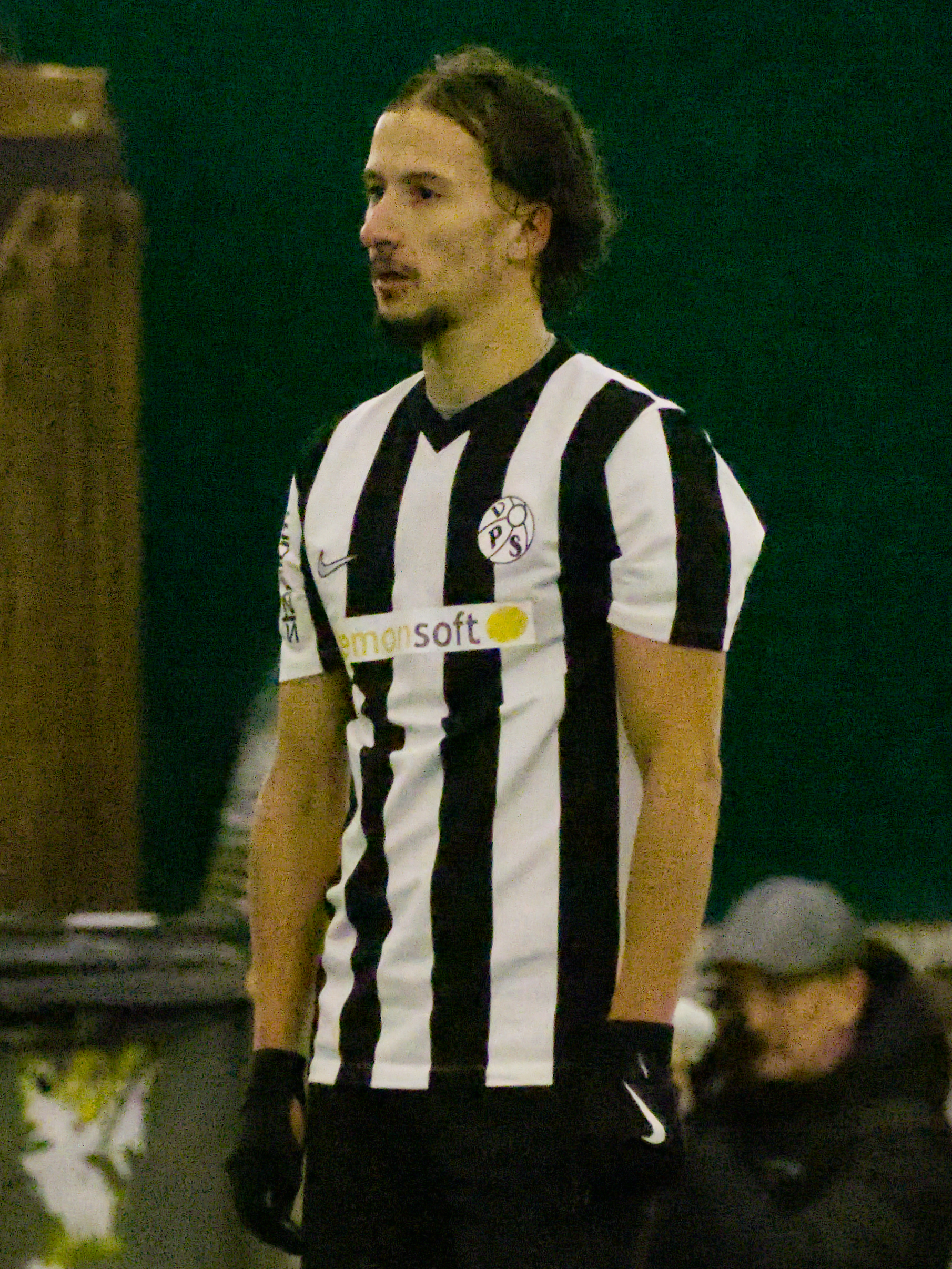
- El Ouatki with VPS in 2026

Personal information
- Date of birth: 10 November 1998 (age 27)
- Place of birth: France
- Height: 1.84 m (6 ft 0 in)
- Position: Central midfielder

Team information
- Current team: Al-Ahly Benghazi
- Number: 20

Youth career
- –2016: Le Havre
- 2016–2017: Rouen
- 2017–2019: PSG

Senior career*
Years	Team	Apps	(Gls)
2019–2023	PSG B	57	(2)
2023	Varbergs BoIS	19	(0)
2024	NSÍ Runavík	9	(0)
2025–2026	VPS	26	(2)
2026-	Al-Ahly Benghazi	0	(0)
- * Club domestic league appearances and goals as of 10 March 2026

Yassine El Ouatki (born 10 November 1998) is a French professional footballer who plays as a midfielder for Libyan Premier League club Al-Ahly Benghazi.

== Career ==
El Ouatki made his senior debut with PSG B reserve team in the French fifth-tier National 3 in 2019. He played with the team until 2023, when he moved to Sweden and signed with Varbergs BoIS in Allsvenskan. He left the club at the end of the season after the relegation.

In June 2024, he joined NSÍ Runavík in the Faroe Islands Premier League.

On 5 November 2024, El Ouatki signed with Finnish Veikkausliiga club Vaasan Palloseura (VPS) until the end of 2026 with a one-year option.

== Personal life ==
Born and raised in France, El Ouatki is of Moroccan descent.

== Career statistics ==
As of 10 March 2026

Appearances and goals by club, season and competition
Club	Season	League			National cup (Note: Includes Svenska Cupen and Suomen Cup)		League cup		Total	
Club	Season	Division	Apps	Goals	Apps	Goals	Apps	Goals	Apps	Goals
Paris Saint-Germain B	2019–20	National 3	15	2	–		–		15	2
Paris Saint-Germain B	2020–21	National 3	6	0	–		–		6	0
Paris Saint-Germain B	2021–22	National 3	24	0	–		–		24	0
Paris Saint-Germain B	2022–23	National 3	12	0	–		–		12	0
Paris Saint-Germain B	Total		57	2	0	0	0	0	57	2
Varbergs BoIS	2023	Allsvenskan	19	0	2	0	–		21	0
NSÍ Runavík	2024	Faroe Islands Premier League	9	0	0	0	–		9	0
VPS	2025	Veikkausliiga	26	2	4	0	5	1	35	3
VPS	2026	Veikkausliiga	0	0	0	0	2	0	2	0
VPS	Total		26	2	4	0	7	1	37	3
Al-Ahly Benghazi	2025–26	Libyan Premier League	0	0	0	0	–		0	0
Career total			111	4	6	0	5	1	122	5
