= Robertinho =

Robertinho is a Portuguese nickname for the name Roberto. Notable people with the name include:

- Robertinho Silva (born 1941), Brazilian jazz drummer
- Robertinho do Recife (born 1953), Brazilian guitarist and composer
- Robertinho (footballer, born 1960), full name Roberto Oliveira Gonçalves do Carmo, Brazilian football manager and former striker
- Robertinho (footballer, born 1988), full name Roberto Soares Anghinetti, Brazilian football winger

== See also ==
- Roberto
