= Robert William =

Brazilian footballer

Personal information
- Full name: Robert William de Souza Ribeiro
- Date of birth: 9 May 1992 (age 34)
- Place of birth: Espírito Santo, Brazil
- Height: 1.78 m (5 ft 10 in)
- Position: Forward

Team information
- Current team: União Frederiquense

Youth career
- –2009: Treviso
- 2009–2010: Lecce
- 2010–2011: ChievoVerona
- 2011–2012: San Paolo

Senior career*
Years	Team	Apps	(Gls)
2013	Resende	0	(0)
2013	Guarani	0	(0)
2014	Madureira	0	(0)
2014	Real Noroeste	0	(0)
2015	Barra Mansa	0	(0)
2015	Rio Branco-ES		
2015–2016	Al-Shabiba Mazraa		
2016	Espírito Santo		
2016	Rondoniense		
2017	Rio Branco-VN	0	(0)
2017	Hercílio Luz	0	(0)
2018	Bento Gonçalves	0	(0)
2018	Operário Mafra	0	(0)
2018	Ozone	7	(8)
2018	Minerva Punjab	0	(0)
2019	Bento Gonçalves		
2019	Barra		
2020–	União Frederiquense	0	(0)
2020	→ Bento Gonçalves (loan)	0	(0)
- * Club domestic league appearances and goals as of 18:28, 4 April 2019 (UTC)

Robert William de Souza Ribeiro (born 9 May 1992), commonly known as Robert William, is a Brazilian footballer who currently plays as a forward for União Frederiquense.

== Career statistics ==
=== Club ===
As of 28 October 2018.

Club	Season	League			Cup		Continental		Other		Total	
Club	Season	Division	Apps	Goals	Apps	Goals	Apps	Goals	Apps	Goals	Apps	Goals
Resende	2013	Série D	0	0	1 (Note: Appearances in Copa do Brasil)	0	–		6 (Note: Appearances in Campeonato Carioca)	2	7	2
Guarani	2013	Série C	0	0	0	0	–		0	0	0	0
Madureira	2014	Série C	0	0	0	0	–		9	1	9	1
Real Noroeste	2014	–			2	1	–		0	0	2	1
Barra Mansa	2015	–			0	0	–		3	0	3	0
Rio Branco-VN	2017	Série D	0	0	0	0	–		12 (Note: Appearances in Campeonato Capixaba Série B)	1	12	1
Hercílio Luz	2017	–			0	0	–		13 (Note: Appearances in Campeonato Catarinense Série B)	0	13	0
Esportivo	2018	–			0	0	–		10 (Note: Appearances in Campeonato Gaúcho Série B)	1	10	1
Operário Mafra	2018	–			0	0	–		8	0	8	0
Ozone	2018–19	I-League 2nd Division	7	8	0	0	–		3 (Note: Appearances in I-League 2nd Division playoffs)	2	10	10
Minerva Punjab	2018–19	I-League 2nd Division	0	0	0	0	–		0	0	0	0
Esportivo	2019	–			0	0	–		12	0	12	0
Career total			7	8	3	1	0	0	76	7	86	16
