= Salaheddine Icharane =

French professional footballer

Personal information
- Date of birth: 21 June 1997 (age 29)
- Place of birth: Morocco
- Position: Forward

Youth career
- 2018: Chabab Mohamedia

Senior career*
Years	Team	Apps	(Gls)
2019	Chabab Mohamedia	23	(3)
- * Club domestic league appearances and goals as of 22:14, 16 December 2020 (UTC)

Salaheddine Icharane is a Moroccan professional footballer who plays as a forward. His first year in the super Moroccan league scored one goal and two goals in the Moroccan cup. He has become the favorite around his teammates for this season among the others.
