= Cédric Elysée Kodjo =

French professional footballer

Personal information
- Full name: Cédric Elysée Kodjo
- Date of birth: 25 February 1993 (age 33)
- Place of birth: Niali Gribouo, Ivory Coast
- Position: Defensive midfielder

Team information
- Current team: FUS Rabat
- Number: 24

Youth career
- 2020: SEWE Sport

Senior career*
Years	Team	Apps	(Gls)
2020	FUS Rabat	8	(0)

International career^{‡}
2015	Ivory Coast	1	(0)
- * Club domestic league appearances and goals as of 19:19, 28 August 2021 (UTC) ‡ National team caps and goals as of 14:19, 23 December 2020 (UTC)

Cédric Elysée Kodjo is an Ivorian professional footballer who plays as a forward.
