= Abdelhak Benchikha =

Algerian football manager (born 1963)

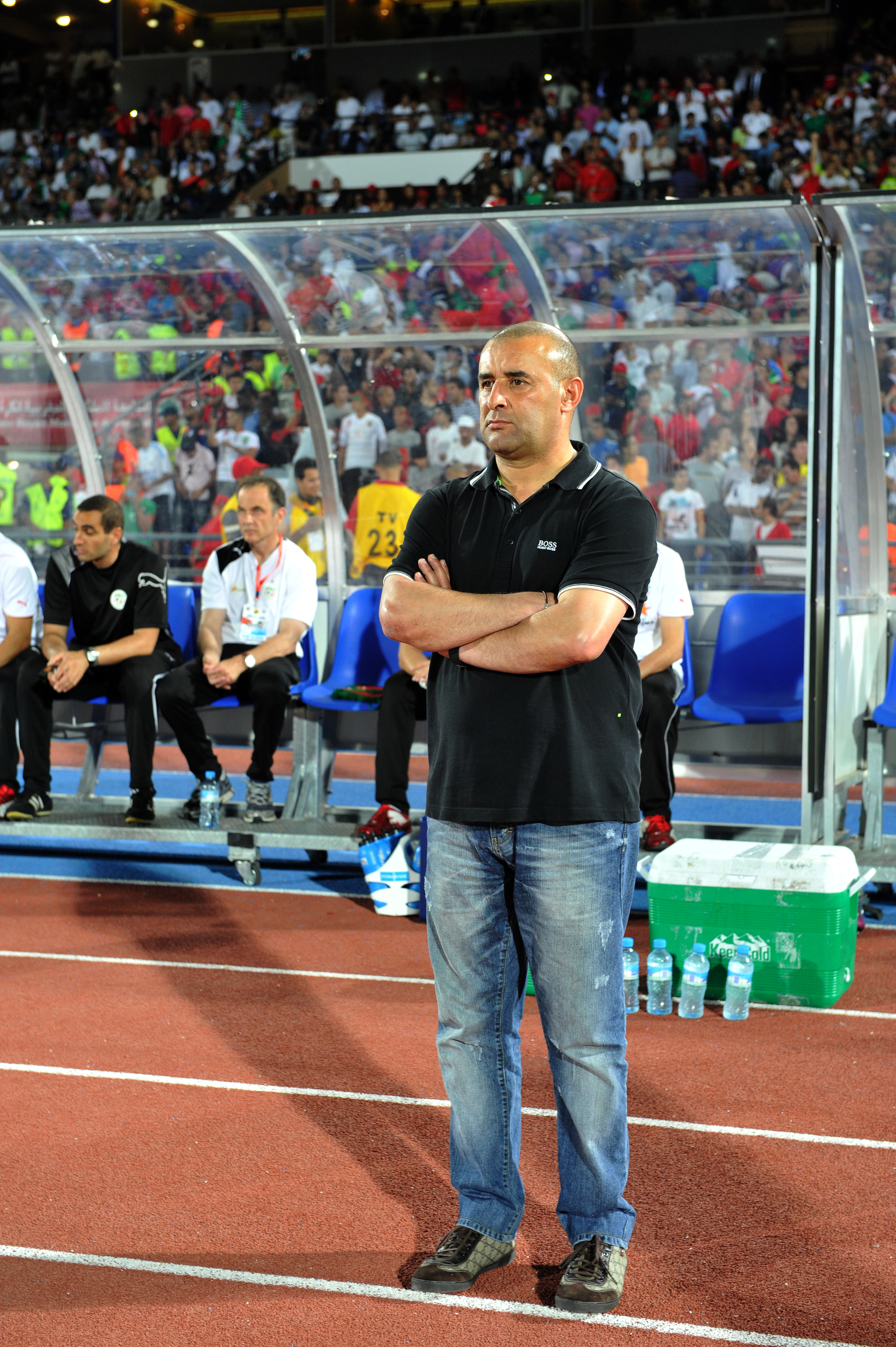
- Benchikha in 2011

Personal information
- Date of birth: 22 November 1963 (age 62)
- Place of birth: Bordj Bou Arréridj, Algeria

Team information
- Current team: IR Tanger (manager)

Youth career
- USM Alger

Senior career*
Years	Team	Apps	(Gls)
- MC Alger
- JS Bordj Ménaïel
- JS El Biar
1991–1994	ES Zarzis		

Managerial career
- 2001: MC Alger
- 2001–2002: Algeria U23
- 2002: CA Bordj Bou Arréridj
- 2005: CR Belouizdad
- 2005–2006: Umm Salal
- 2006–2007: ES Zarzis
- 2007–2009: Club Africain
- 2009–2010: Algeria A' / Algeria U23
- 2010–2011: Algeria
- 2011–2012: MC Alger
- 2011–2012: Club Africain
- 2013–2014: DH El Jadida
- 2014: Raja CA
- 2014–2015: Al-Ittihad Kalba
- 2015–2017: IR Tanger
- 2017: Raja CA
- 2017: MA Tétouan
- 2018: ES Sétif
- 2018–2019: Al-Ittihad Tripoli
- 2019–2020: Mouloudia Oujda
- 2020–2022: DH El Jadida
- 2022: RS Berkane
- 2022–2023: USM Alger
- 2023–2024: Simba Sports Club
- 2024–2025: JS Kabylie
- 2025–2026: USM Alger
- 2026–: IR Tanger
- * Club domestic league appearances and goals

Abdelhak Benchikha (Arabic: عبد الحق بن شيخة; born 22 November 1963) is an Algerian football coach and former player. He is current manager of Botola Pro club IR Tanger.

== Personal life ==
Benchikha was born on 22 November 1963 in the Soustarah neighborhood of Algiers.

His family is originally from the village of Sidi Abderrahmane in the commune of Timezrit, Boumerdès Province.

== Managerial career ==
Benchikha began his managerial career coach with CR Belouizdad, where he helped win the league title two consecutive seasons (2000 and 2001). He then briefly coached MC Alger and the Algerian Under-23 national team before returning to CR Belouizdad in the later part of the 2004–05 season. Benchikha then moved to Qatar and joined Umm-Salal Sports Club, which was playing in the second division. In his only season with the club, he helped it gain promotion to the top flight. The following season, he joined the Tunisian side ES Zarzis.

=== Club Africain ===
On 13 June 2007 Benchikha signed a one-year contract with Tunisian side Club Africain. In his first season with the club, he led them to the league title for the first time in 12 years, beating out Etoile du Sahel by just 2 points in the final standings. Just a few months later, he followed that up with a triumph in the 2008 North African Cup of Champions beating Moroccan club FAR Rabat in the final. In March 2009, the club offered him an extension but Benchikha chose to leave the club.

=== Algeria A' ===
On 10 June 2009, Benchikha was appointed as coach of the Algeria A' national football team and the Algerian Under-23 national team. He qualified the A' national team to the 2011 African Nations Championship, after beating Libya 2–2 on the away goals rule.

=== Algeria National Team ===
On 13 September 2010, Benchikha was appointed as coach of the Algerian national team on a permanent basis, following the resignation Rabah Saâdane. On 5 June 2011, a day after losing 4–0 in a 2012 Africa Cup of Nations qualifier against Morocco, Benchikha resigned from his position.

=== Club-hopping tenure ===
On 5 October 2011, Benchikha resigned from his position as manager of MC Alger.

On 17 December 2011, Benchikha signed an 18-month contract with Tunisian Ligue Professionnelle 1 side Club Africain, returning to the club which he led to the 2008 league title. However, on 20 April 2012, a mutual agreement was reached by the club and Benchikha to terminate his contract.

He later had short spells in different countries, in which he managed Difaâ El Jadidi, Raja Casablanca, IR Tanger, Moghreb Tétouan, Mouloudia Oujda, DH El Jadida and RS Berkane in Morocco, Al-Ittihad Kalba in the United Arab Emirates, ES Sétif in Algeria and Al-Ittihad Tripoli in Libya.

=== USM Alger ===
On 25 December 2022, Benchikha contracted with USM Alger for a year and a half succeeding Boualem Charef, with Farid Zamiti assistant and Farid Belmellat coach of the goalkeepers. On 13 March 2023, in the late match against HB Chelghoum Laïd in the Ligue 1, USM Alger supporters in the 37th minute of the second half left the stands in protest against the club administration. After the end of the match Benchikha stated that he did not understand the anger of the supporters and that he Satisfied with the performance of his players, especially since in a month they played eight matches. Benchikha set a goal, which is to win the CAF Confederation Cup, and his career was good, with his experience and the way he treated his players. Benchikha said after the match against ASEC Mimosas in the semi-finals that it is the time to win the CAF Confederation Cup title for the first time.

In the final against Young Africans, Benchikha managed to win his first title in Algeria and the first continental title in the history of USM Alger. After the derby match against CR Belouizdad, Benchikha stated that the players after winning the CAF Confederation Cup went on vacation and that some players decided to leave. Benchikha said that he is comfortable and that if he can compete for titles he will stay or prefer to stay in his home. On 16 July 2023, Benchikha announced after the end of the Ligue 1 that he would remain in the club despite the offers he had received from clubs outside the country. Benchikha said that he started recruiting and that there were players who agreed with them to sign and others who renewed their contracts. On 15 September 2023, Benchikha won the CAF Super Cup title for the second consecutive season after winning against Al Ahly, it is the second African title that he presented to USM Alger in three months. On 9 October 2023 Abdelhak Benchikha submitted his resignation from his position, according to the official page on Facebook. The reason was that he was subjected to insults at the entrance to the Omar Hamadi Stadium. Later via video, Benchikha denied this and said that he resigned for sporting and professional reasons.

=== Simba SC ===
On 24 November 2023, Benchikha signed as Simba SC head coach replacing Robertinho, penning a contract for a year and a half. On 27 April 2024 Benchikha won the Tanzania FA Cup title against the NBC Premier League runner-up Azam. For his first season with the Tanzanians won the FA Cup and reached the quarter-finals of the CAF Champions League losing to the title holders Al Ahly. The next day, Simba SC announced in a press release that Benchikha and his Algerian assistants, Kamel Boudjenane and Farid Zemiti, have decided to leave the club for family reasons. In a video published by the club's networks, Benchikha thanked the supporters, the staff and all of Simba SC.

=== JS Kabylie ===
On 30 June 2024, replacing the coaching duo of Djilali Bahloul and Rabah Bensafi, Benchikha was appointed head coach of JS Kabylie, a role he held until 3 January 2025 when he resigned in front of journalists after an Algerian Cup game, citing fan hostility as the reason. By resigning from his position as head coach of JSK, even though he had the support of his management, he abandoned the club, in the middle of the season. He was under contract with JS Kabylie until the end of the 2025–26 season. On 6 January 2025, the president of JS Kabylie, El Hadi Ould Ali responded to Benchikha in a press release where he said he deplored the way in which Benchikha announced his resignation but especially the justification of this to a supposed isolated incident involving a supporter. After Benchikha's resignation from JSK, the Kabyle club signed German coach Josef Zinnbauer, on 20 January 2025. With Zinnbauer, JS Kabylie finished second in the 2024–25 Algerian Ligue 1, qualifying for the 2025–26 CAF Champions League.

=== Modern Future FC ===
On 14 February 2025, Benchikha became the new coach of the Egyptian first division club, Modern Future FC. On 2 June 2025, after he saved Modern Future FC from relegation, the Egyptian club announced the departure of the team's coach.

=== USM Alger for the second time ===
On August 12, 2025, USM Alger officially announced the appointment of Abdelhak Benchikha as head coach for a one-year term. He succeeds Mohamed Lacet, whose contract was not renewed. Benchikha is making his return to the “Red and Black” bench, having already led the team in 2023 to a historic double: the CAF Confederation Cup and the CAF Super Cup, won against Egypt’s Al Ahly. « Benchikha is one of the iconic figures in the club’s history, having guided our team to great success. We welcome him back to the Union family and wish him every success in leading the team to further titles »,” read USMA’s statement. On 27 January 2026, Benchikha left the club after terminating his contract with the club by mutual consent.

=== Ittihad Tanger (2026– ) ===
On 10 March 2026, Abdelhak Benchikha was reportedly set to become the head coach of Ittihad Tanger. The appointment had not yet been officially confirmed by the club at the time of the reports.

== Honours ==
=== Manager ===
Umm Salal

- Qatari Second Division: 2005–06

Club Africain

- Tunisian Ligue Professionnelle 1: 2007–08
- North African Cup of Champions: 2008

Difaâ d'El Jadida

- Moroccan Throne Cup: 2013

RS Berkane

- CAF Super Cup: 2022

USM Alger

- CAF Confederation Cup: 2022–23
- CAF Super Cup: 2023

Simba SC

- Tanzania FA Cup: 2024

== Managerial statistics ==
As of match played 9 October 2023

Team	Nat	From	To	Record				
Team	Nat	From	To	P	W	D	L	Win %
Club Africain	(Tunisia)	11 June 2008		30	22	6	2	73.33
Algeria A'	(Algeria)			13	7	4	2	53.85
Algeria	(Algeria)	13 September 2010	5 June 2011	4	1	1	2	25.00
MC Alger	(Algeria)	1 September 2011	5 October 2011	6	3	1	2	50.00
Club Africain	(Tunisia)	17 December 2011	20 April 2012	0	0	0	0	—
Difaâ Hassani El Jadidi	(Morocco)	20 July 2013		43	20	16	7	46.51
Raja Casablanca	(Morocco)	4 June 2014	25 September 2014	7	4	1	2	57.14
Ittihad Kalba FC	(United Arab Emirates)	24 October 2014		16	9	1	6	56.25
IR Tanger	(Morocco)	2 June 2015	18 April 2017	54	24	22	8	44.44
Moghreb Tétouan	(Morocco)	6 September 2017		14	7	1	6	50.00
ES Sétif	(Algeria)	28 December 2017	25 April 2018	17	6	4	7	35.29
Al-Ittihad Club	(Libya)	13 July 2013	2 March 2019	11	8	1	2	72.73
MC Oujda	(Morocco)	12 June 2019		30	12	12	6	40.00
Difaâ Hassani El Jadidi	(Morocco)	20 October 2020	30 June 2022	48	17	18	13	35.42
RS Berkane	(Morocco)	10 August 2022	11 November 2022	11	3	3	5	27.27
USM Alger	(Algeria)	25 December 2022	9 October 2023	34	12	9	13	35.29
Career Total				338	155	100	83	45.86
