= Hassan Moumen =

Moroccan football coach

Managerial career
- Years: Team
- 2008–????: FUS de Rabat
- 2009–2010: Morocco

Hassan Moumen is a Moroccan football coach who was appointed manager of the Moroccan national side in July 2009. Moumen also managed Moroccan club side FUS de Rabat.
