= Shaban Idd Chilunda =

Tanzanian professional footballer

Shaaban Chilunda
Personal information
- Full name: Shaaban Idd Chilunda
- Date of birth: 20 June 1998 (age 28)
- Place of birth: Tandahimba, Tanzania
- Height: 1.78 m (5 ft 10 in)
- Position: Striker

Team information
- Current team: Simba
- Number: 30

Youth career
- Own
- 2012–2016: Azam

Senior career*
Years	Team	Apps	(Gls)
2016–2020	Azam		
2018–2019	→ Tenerife (loan)	3	(0)
2019	→ Izarra (loan)	7	(0)
2020–2021	Moghreb Tétouan	19	(2)
2022	Azam		
2023–	Simba		

International career^{‡}
2018–2021	Tanzania	7	(0)
- * Club domestic league appearances and goals as of 21:20, 10 August 2023 (UTC) ‡ National team caps and goals as of 21:20, 10 August 2023 (UTC)

Shaaban Idd Chilunda (born 20 June 1998) is a Tanzanian professional footballer who plays for Simba as a striker.

== Club career ==
Born in Tandahimba, Chilunda joined Azam FC's youth setup in 2012. He made his first-team debut in 2016, and on 9 July 2018, he scored four times in a 4–2 home win against Rayon Sports FC for the year's Kagame Interclub Cup; he also scored the opener in a 2–1 final win against Simba SC.

On 7 August 2018, Chilunda agreed to a two-year loan deal with Spanish Segunda División side CD Tenerife, after a trial period. He made his professional debut thirteen days later, coming on as a late substitute for Filip Malbašić in a 1–1 away draw against Gimnàstic de Tarragona.
