= Adil Serraj =

Moroccan footballer

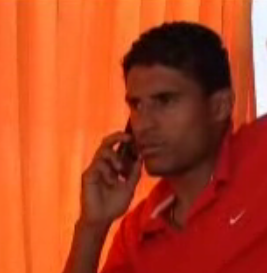

Personal information
- Date of birth: 26 August 1979 (age 47)
- Place of birth: Casablanca, Morocco
- Height: 1.71 m (5 ft 7 in)
- Position: Defender

Team information
- Current team: Nahdat Berkane

Youth career
- 1992–1998: Raja Casablanca

Senior career*
Years	Team	Apps	(Gls)
1998–2000	Raja Casablanca		
2000–2001	Chabab Mohammédia		
2001–2003	FUS Rabat		
2003–2004	Wydad Casablanca		
2004–2009	FAR Rabat		
2009–2010	Kawkab Marrakech	24	(0)
2010–2011	FAR Rabat	16	(0)
2011–2013	COD Meknès		
2013–	Nahdat Berkane	34	(0)

International career
2008	Morocco	1	(0)
- * Club domestic league appearances and goals

Adil Serraj (born 26 August 1979) is a Moroccan footballer who currently plays for Renaissance de Berkane. He usually plays as defender.

== Career ==
Serraj began playing football for the Raja Casablanca youth sides under manager Abdesalam Serraj, his father and former Raja player. He joined Raja's first team in 1998, making his debut in a league match against FAR Rabat. Adil would win the 1999 Moroccan first division, 1999 CAF Champions League and 2000 CAF Super Cup with Raja. The club qualified for the 2000 FIFA Club World Cup in Brazil, and Serraj was a member of the squad but did not play.

Looking for more playing time, he joined Chabab Mohammédia, but left the club after just two months. He spent the next two seasons with FUS Rabat, but after the club was relegated from the first division in 2003, he joined Wydad Casablanca.

He next joined FAR Rabat, and helped the club win the CAF Cup in 2005.
