= Jonathan Ifunga Ifasso =

DR Congolese footballer

Personal information
- Full name: Jonathan Ifunga Ifasso
- Date of birth: 10 March 1999 (age 27)
- Place of birth: Kinshasa, DR Congo
- Height: 1.72 m (5 ft 8 in)
- Position: Midfielder

Team information
- Current team: DC Motema Pembe

Senior career*
| Years | Team | Apps | (Gls) |
| 2017–2018 | Dauphins Noirs | | |
| 2018–2019 | Nyuki | | |
| 2019–2021 | DHJ | 23 | (1) |
| 2022-2023 | AS Simba | | |
| 2023 | Rayon Sports | | |
| 2023-2024 | Al-Hilal SC | | |
| 2025- | DC Motema Pembe | | |

International career^{‡}
| 2020– | DR Congo | 1 | (0) |
- * Club domestic league appearances and goals as of 12 March 2021 ‡ National team caps and goals as of 12 March 2021

Jonathan Ifunga Ifasso (born 10 March 1999) is a Congolese professional footballer who plays as a midfielder for DHJ. He represents the DR Congo national team.

== Career ==
Ifasso began his senior career with Dauphins Noirs and Nyuki in his native Congo. He transferred to DHJ in Morocco in 2019.

== International career ==
Ifasso debuted with the DR Congo national team in a 3–0 friendly loss to Burkina Faso on 9 October 2020.
