= Jean-Joseph Kombous Njock =

Cameroonian footballer

Jean-Joseph Kombous
Personal information
- Full name: Jean-Joseph Kombous Njock
- Date of birth: 19 April 1995 (age 31)
- Place of birth: Yaoundé, Cameroon
- Height: 1.69 m (5 ft 7 in)
- Position: Forward

Team information
- Current team: Kawkab AC Marrakech

Senior career*
| Years | Team | Apps | (Gls) |
| 2014–2018 | Cotonsport Garoua | | |
| 2018–2019 | KAC Kenitra | | |
| 2019–2021 | FUS Rabat | 45 | (9) |
| 2021–2023 | Union Touarga Sport | | |
| 2023– | Kawkab AC Marrakech | | |

International career
| 2016 | Cameroon | 1 | (0) |
- * Club domestic league appearances and goals as of 18 April 2020

Jean-Joseph Kombous Njock is a Cameroonian footballer who plays as a forward for Kawkab AC Marrakech.
