= Abderrahim Talib =

Moroccan footballer and manager

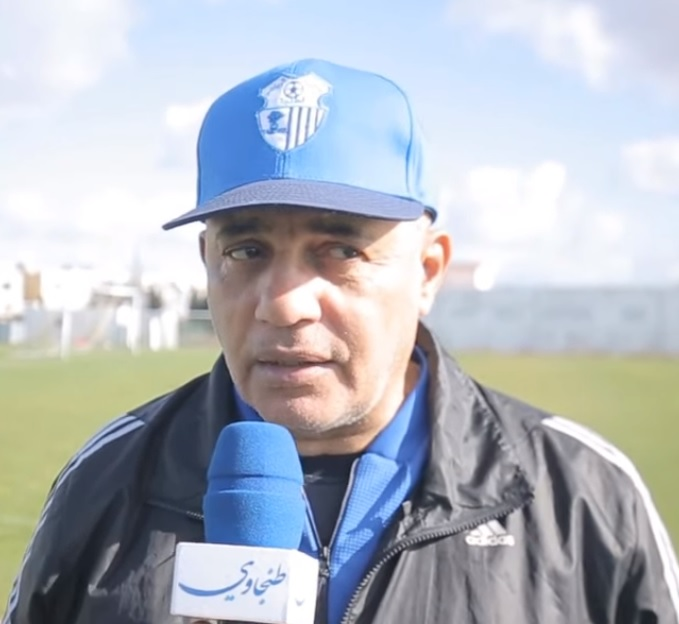
- Taleb in 2019

Personal information
- Date of birth: September 10, 1955 (age 71)
- Place of birth: Casablanca, Morocco

Team information
- Current team: APR F.C. (manager)

Managerial career
- Years: Team
- 2007–2009: Moghreb Tétouan
- 2009–2011: Wydad de Fès
- 2011–2012: COD Meknès
- 2012–2013: RSB Berkane
- 2013: Wydad Casablanca
- 2014: Wydad de Fès
- 2014–2015: RSB Berkane
- 2016–2018: DHJ
- 2019: IR Tanger
- 2019–2020: AS FAR
- 2020–2021: TAS Casablanca
- 2021–2022: Olympic Safi
- 2023: DHJ
- 2025–: APR F.C.

Abderrahim Talib (Arabic: عبد الرحيم طاليب; born 10 September 1955 in Casablanca) is a Moroccan football manager and former player.
