= CD Marianao Poblet =

Spanish football club

Marianao Poblet
- Full name: Club Deportivo Marianao Poblet
- Founded: 1994
- Ground: Municipal de Marianao, Barcelona, Spain
- Capacity: 1,500
- Chairman: José Rodríguez
- League: Segona Catalana – Group 3
- 2024–25: Segona Catalana – Group 3, 8th of 16
Home colours	Away colours

Club Deportivo Marianao Poblet is a Spanish football club located in Sant Boi de Llobregat, Barcelona, Spain. Founded in 1994, it currently plays in Segona Catalana – Group 3. The team's colors are red and black.

== History ==
Founded in 1994 after the merger of UD Marianao (founded in 1976) and CF Poblet (founded in 1991), the new club was named CD Marianao Poblet. In 2004, the club achieved promotion to the Primera Catalana after buying the place of CE L'Hospitalet Atlètic.

== Season to season ==
Season	Tier	Division	Place	Copa del Rey
1994–95	7	1ª Terr.	8th	
1995–96	7	1ª Terr.	5th	
1996–97	7	1ª Terr.	10th	
1997–98	7	1ª Terr.	14th	
1998–99	8	2ª Terr.	1st	
1999–2000	7	1ª Terr.	8th	
2000–01	7	1ª Terr.	1st	
2001–02	6	Pref. Terr.	10th	
2002–03	6	Pref. Terr.	12th	
2003–04	6	Pref. Terr.	17th	
2004–05	5	1ª Cat.	19th	
2005–06	6	Pref. Terr.	3rd	
2006–07	6	Pref. Terr.	10th	
2007–08	6	Pref. Terr.	1st	
2008–09	5	1ª Cat.	5th	
2009–10	5	1ª Cat.	18th	
2010–11	6	Pref. Terr.	15th	
2011–12	6	2ª Cat.	11th	
2012–13	6	2ª Cat.	1st	
2013–14	5	1ª Cat.	17th	

Season	Tier	Division	Place	Copa del Rey
2014–15	6	2ª Cat.	5th	
2015–16	6	2ª Cat.	9th	
2016–17	6	2ª Cat.	8th	
2017–18	6	2ª Cat.	13th	
2018–19	6	2ª Cat.	13th	
2019–20	6	2ª Cat.	9th	
2020–21	6	2ª Cat.	8th	
2021–22	7	2ª Cat.	4th	
2022–23	7	2ª Cat.	7th	
2023–24	8	2ª Cat.	6th	
2024–25	8	2ª Cat.	8th	
2025–26	8	2ª Cat.		
