= Difaâ Hassani El Jadidi =

Moroccan football club

Difaâ El Jadidi
- Full name: Difaâ Hassani El Jadidi
- Founded: 1 June 1956; 70 years ago
- Ground: El Abdi Stadium
- Capacity: 8,000
- Chairman: Abdelatif Moktarid
- Manager: Ricardo Chéu
- League: Botola Pro
- 2025–26: Botola Pro, 6th of 16
- Website: dhjfoot.com
| Home colours | Away colours | Third colours |

Difaâ Hassani El Jadidi (Arabic: الدفاع الحسني الجديدي) is a Moroccan football club based in El Jadida. They are currently playing in the Botola Pro.

== Home stadium ==
DHJ play their home games at the Stade El Abdi.

== Crest ==
Former logo

Present logo

== Kit ==
The historical kit of Difaa El Jadida

== Honours ==
- Moroccan Championship
  - Runners-up (3): 1975–76, 2008–09, 2016–17
- Moroccan Cup
  - Winners (1): 2013
  - Runners-up (4): 1977, 1985, 1986, 2017

== Performance in CAF competitions ==
- CAF Champions League: 1 appearance

2010 – First Round
2018 – Group stage

- CAF Confederation Cup: 1 appearance

2011 – Second Round of 16
2014 – Second Round of 16

- CAF Cup Winners' Cup: 1 appearance

1986 – Quarter-finals

== Current squad ==
As of 1 October 2026

Note: Flags indicate national team as defined under FIFA eligibility rules; some limited exceptions apply. Players may hold more than one non-FIFA nationality.

| No. | Pos. | Nation | Player |
|---|---|---|---|
| 2 | DF | MAR | Oussama Benchchaoui |
| 3 | DF | MAR | Hamza Malki |
| 5 | MF | MAR | Reda Ech-Chgraoui |
| 6 | MF | MAR | Brahim Bouzidi |
| 7 | MF | MAR | Imad Sabik |
| 8 | MF | MAR | Ayoub El Khafi |
| 9 | FW | SEN | Romuald Dacosta |
| 10 | MF | MAR | Mouad Mouchtanim |
| 11 | MF | MAR | Omar Hmamouch |
| 13 | DF | MAR | Aymen Riyane |
| 14 | DF | MAR | Mohamed Bentarcha |
| 15 | MF | FRA | Yassine El Ouatki |
| 16 | GK | MAR | Ayoub Ait Wahmane |
| 17 | FW | MAR | Abderrazak Ennakouss |

| No. | Pos. | Nation | Player |
|---|---|---|---|
| 18 | MF | MTN | Moctar El Hacen |
| 19 | MF | MAR | Houdaifa Jamaäne |
| 20 | DF | MLI | Boulkassoum Diarra |
| 22 | MF | MAR | Mohamed Hilali |
| 23 | DF | MAR | Soufiane Abaaziz |
| 24 | DF | MAR | Zakaria Oubraim |
| 30 | GK | MTN | Babacar Niasse |
| 55 | FW | SEN | Papa Diallo |
| 70 | MF | ANG | Megue |
| 77 | FW | SEN | Ibra Lo |
| 88 | MF | MAR | Youssef Michte |
| 99 | MF | MAR | Achraf Al Idrissi |
| — | FW | MAR | Abdellah Farah |
| — | DF | MAR | Anas Moulhami |

== Former players ==
- (Belarus) Ivan Zhekiu

== Managers ==
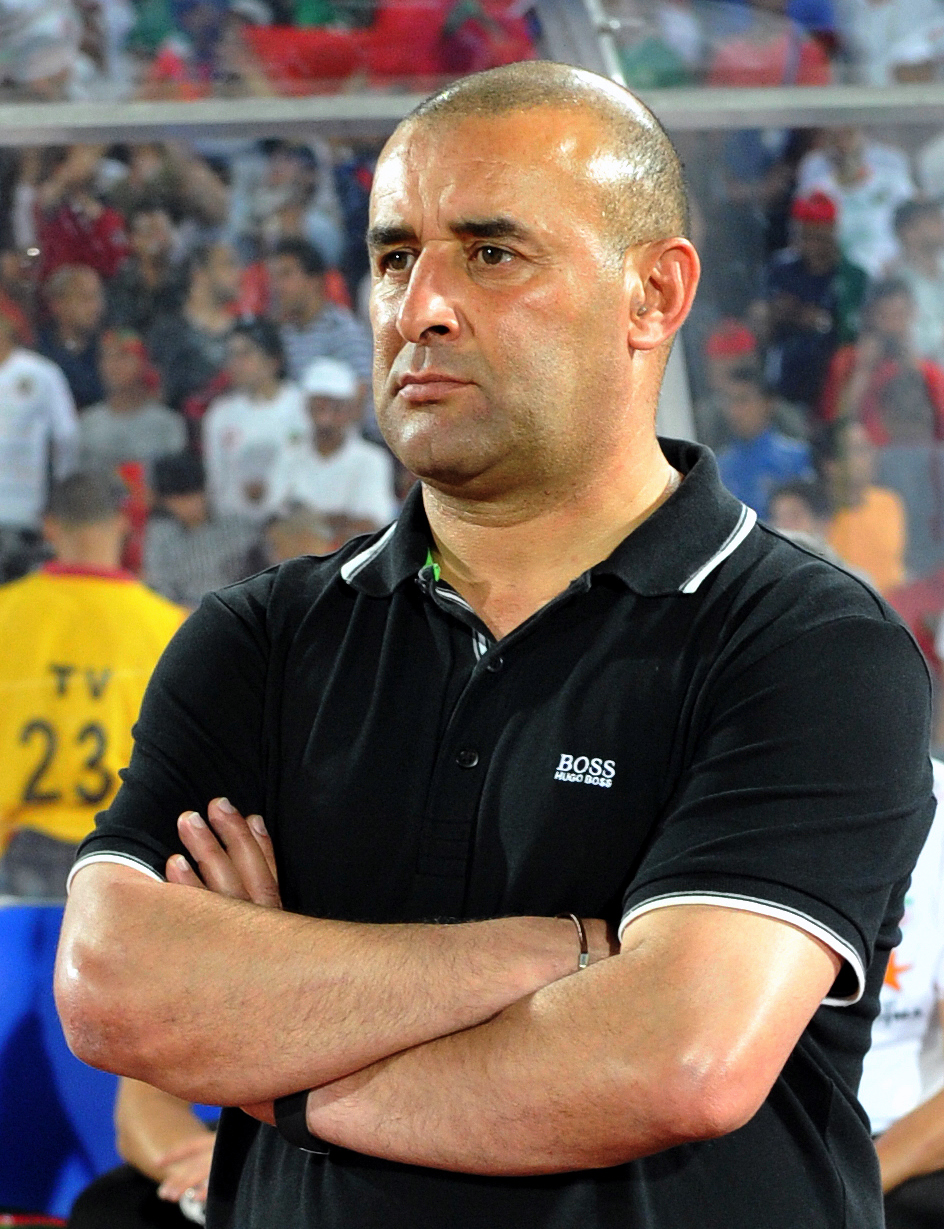
Abdelhak Benchikha managed the Difaâ El Jadidi in two spells.

- (France) Jules Accorsi (1989–91), (1995–96)
- (France) Jean-Christian Lang (2006–08)
- (France) François Bracci (2008)
- (France) Denis Lavagne (July 1, 2008 – June 30, 2009)
- (Morocco) Jaouad Milani (March 12, 2011 – Jan 2, 2013)
- (Morocco) Hassan Moumen (Jan 4, 2013 – April 28, 2013)
- (Algeria) Abdelhak Benchikha (July 8, 2013 – May 29, 2014)
- (Egypt) Hassan Shehata (June 4, 2014–14)
- (Egypt) Tarek Mostafa (2014–15)
- (Morocco) Abderrahim Taleb (2016–2018)
- (France) Hubert Velud (2018–2019)
- (Morocco) Ezzaki Badou (2019)
- (Algeria) Abdelhak Benchikha (2020–2022)
- (Tunisia) Lassaad Chabbi (2022–2023)
- (Morocco) Abderrahim Taleb (2023)
- (Morocco) Abdelkrim Jinani (2023)
- (Portugal) Jorge Paixão (2023–)
