= 2024–25 Raja CA season =

Raja CA
2024–25 season
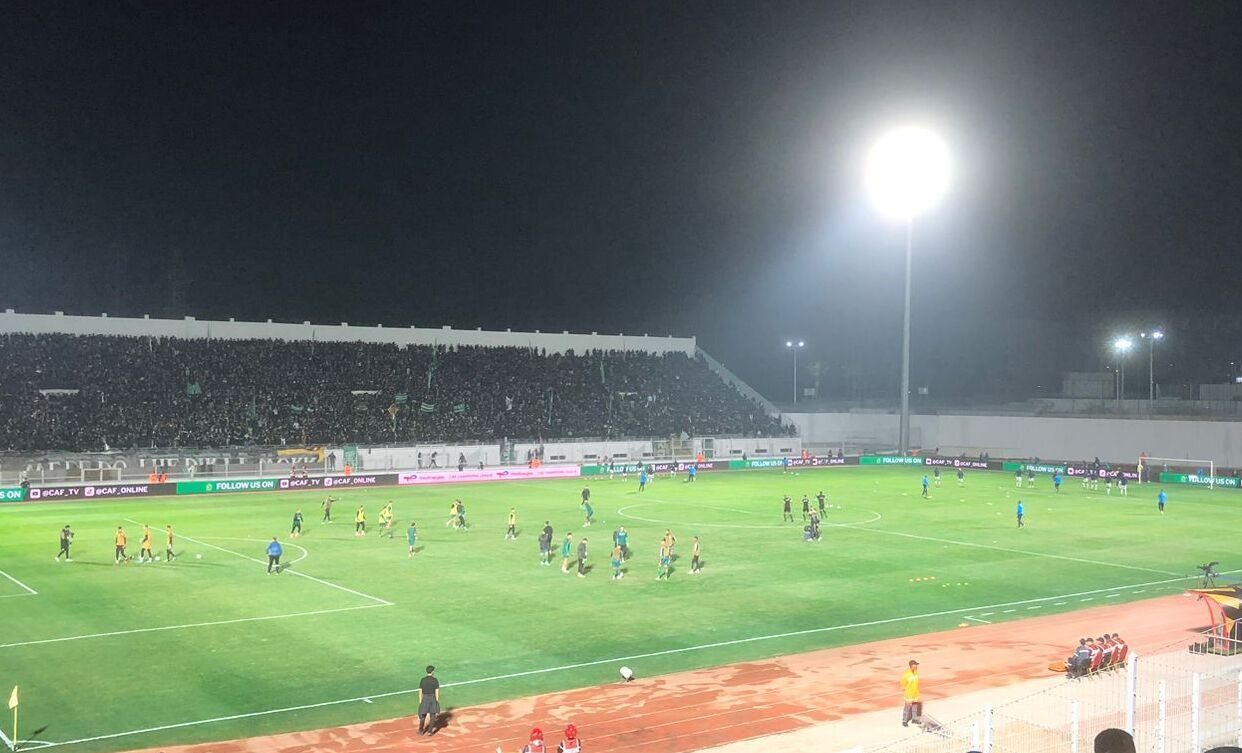
- Champions league match against Mamelodi Sundowns at Larbi Zaouli Stadium, on 4 January 2025
- President: Adil Hala (until 27 January); Abdellah Birouaine (interim)
- Manager: Rusmir Cviko (until 28 September); Abdelkrim Jinani (interim, from 28 September to 9 October); Ricardo Sá Pinto (from 10 October to 20 December); Hafid Abdessadek (interim, from 20 December to 4 January); Lassaad Chabbi
- Stadium: Stade Larbi Zaouli (until 12 April); Stade Mohammed V
- Botola: 7th
- Throne Cup: Round of 16
- Excellence Cup: Third place
- Champions League: Group stage
- Top goalscorer: League: Houssine Rahimi (11); All: Adam Ennafati (13)
- Average home league attendance: 22,120
- Biggest win: 0–6 v SCC Mohammédia (Away, 12 May 2025, Botola)
- Biggest defeat: 3–1 v Ittihad Tanger (Away, 25 September 2024, Botola)
Home colours	Away colours	Third colours

The 2024–25 season is Raja Club Athletic's 76th season in existence and the club's 68th consecutive season in the top flight of Moroccan football. In addition to the domestic league, they are also participating in this season's editions of the Throne Cup and Champions League. Following the renovation of Stade Mohammed V, Raja played all home fixtures at Stade Larbi Zaouli at 25,000 capacity, until 12 April 2025 when Raja played the Derby in Stade Mohammed V.

Raja CA kicked off the season with a 1–2 win over AS GNN in the first round of the 2024–25 CAF Champions League.

== Players ==
=== First-team squad ===
Players and squad numbers last updated on 19 September 2024.

Note: Flags indicate national team as has been defined under FIFA eligibility rules. Players may hold more than one non-FIFA nationality.

No.	Name	Nat.	Position	Date of birth (age)	Signed from
Goalkeepers
1	Anas Zniti	(Morocco)	GK	28 October 1988 (aged 36)	(Morocco) AS FAR
12	El Mehdi Al Harrar	(Morocco)	GK	30 November 2000 (aged 24)	(Morocco) Chabab Mohammédia
32	Yassine Zoubir	(Morocco)	GK	24 February 2002 (aged 23)	(Morocco) Youth system
Defenders
5	Abdellah Khafifi	(Morocco)	CB	19 February 1993 (aged 32)	(Qatar) Umm Salal
4	Hani Amamou	(Tunisia)	CB	16 September 1997 (age 29)	(Tunisia) ES Tunis
28	Bouchaib Arrassi	(Morocco)	CB	6 January 2000 (aged 25)	(Morocco) Youth system
33	Mehdi Mchakhchekh	(Morocco)	CB	23 February 2004 (aged 21)	(Morocco) Youth system
16	Benaissa Benamar	(Morocco)	CB	7 April 1997 (aged 28)	(Netherlands) FC Volendam
23	Yasser Baldé	(Guinea)	CB	12 January 1993 (aged 32)	(Thailand) Ratchaburi FC
27	Mohamed Boulacsoute	(Morocco)	RB / RW / LW	23 September 1998 (aged 26)	(Morocco) Chabab Mohammédia
17	Youssef Belammari	(Morocco)	LB / LM	20 September 1998 (aged 26)	(Morocco) Fath US
3	Zakaria Labib	(Morocco)	LB	28 February 2003 (aged 22)	(Morocco) Youth system
2	Abdelkrim Baadi	(Morocco)	LB / RB	16 April 1996 (aged 29)	(Morocco) RS Berkane
Midfielders
6	Mouhsine Bodda	(Mauritania)	CM / DM	18 July 1997 (aged 27)	(Mauritania) FC Nouadhibou
18	Federico Bikoro	(Equatorial Guinea)	CM / DM	17 March 1996 (aged 29)	(Tunisia) Club Africain
19	Mohamed Zrida	(Morocco)	CM / AM / LM	1 February 1999 (aged 26)	(Morocco) Youth system
8	Hilal Ferdaoussi	(Morocco)	DM / CM / AM	23 June 1999 (aged 26)	(Morocco) Moghreb Tétouan
34	Sabir Bougrine	(Morocco)	AM / CM	10 July 1996 (aged 28)	(Tunisia) Espérance de Tunis
77	Adam Ennafati	(Morocco)	AM / LW / RW	29 June 1994 (aged 31)	(Morocco) AS FAR
Forwards
26	Yousri Bouzok	(Algeria)	RW / LW	18 August 1996 (aged 28)	(Algeria) Paradou AC
20	Marouane Zila	(Morocco)	LW / RW	13 June 1997 (aged 28)	(Morocco) Chabab Mohammédia
21	Pape Ousmane Sakho	(Senegal)	LW / RW / AM	21 December 1996 (aged 28)	(France) Quevilly-Rouen
24	Ayoub Maamouri	(Morocco)	LW / RW	1 December 2000 (aged 24)	(Morocco) Olympique Dcheira
40	Younes Najari	(Morocco)	RW / LW	6 February 1996 (aged 29)	(Kuwait) Al-Salmiya SC
11	Nawfel Zerhouni	(Morocco)	ST / RW / LW	25 September 1995 (aged 29)	(Saudi Arabia) Al-Hazem
9	Houssine Rahimi	(Morocco)	ST	4 February 2002 (aged 23)	(Morocco) Youth system
29	Abderahmane Soussi	(Morocco)	ST	30 January 2003 (aged 22)	(Cyprus) Akritas Chlorakas

=== New contracts ===
Date	Position	No.	Player	Ref.
20 July 2024	MF	71	(Ivory Coast) Hervé Guy	

== Transfers ==
=== In ===
Date	Pos'	Player	Moving from	Fee	Ref.
6 June 2024	GK	(Morocco) El Mehdi Al Harrar	SCC Mohammédia	Free agent	
6 June 2024	MF	(Morocco) Hilal Ferdaoussi	MA Tétouan	Free agent	
30 June 2024	FW	(Morocco) Houssine Rahimi	JS Soualem	End of loan	
4 July 2024	DF	(Morocco) Abdelkrim Baadi	RS Berkane	Free agent	
21 July 2024	DF	(Tunisia) Hani Amamou	(Tunisia) ES Tunis	Free agent	
23 August 2024	MF	(Mauritania) Mouhsine Bodda	(Mauritania) FC Nouadhibou	Free agent	
24 August 2024	MF	(Equatorial Guinea) Federico Bikoro	(Tunisia) Club Africain	Free agent	
24 August 2024	FW	(Senegal) Pape Ousmane Sakho	(France) Quevilly-Rouen	Free agent	
27 August 2024	FW	(Morocco) Ayoub Maamouri	Olympique Dcheira	€80 k	
19 September 2024	DF	(Morocco) Benaissa Benamar	(Netherlands) FC Volendam	Free agent	
19 September 2024	DF	(Guinea) Yasser Baldé	(Thailand) Ratchaburi FC	Free agent	
19 September 2024	FW	(Morocco) Abderahmane Soussi	(Cyprus) Akritas Chlorakas	Free agent	
19 September 2024	FW	(Morocco) Younes Najari	(Kuwait) Al-Salmiya SC	Free agent	

=== Out ===
Date	Pos'	Player	Moving to	Fee	Ref.
15 May 2024	MF	(Morocco) Zakaria El Wardi	Unattached	Released	
2 June 2024	MF	(South Africa) Haashim Domingo	(South Africa) Cape Town City	Released	
30 June 2024	FW	(Algeria) Riad Benayad	(Tunisia) Espérance de Tunis	End of loan	
30 June 2024	MF	(Morocco) El Mehdi Moubarik	(United Arab Emirates) Al Ain FC	End of loan	
8 July 2024	FW	(Morocco) Abdellah Farah	US Touarga	Released	
12 July 2024	FW	(Bolivia) Víctor Ábrego	(Bolivia) C.A. Nacional Potosí	Loan	
20 July 2024	DF	(Morocco) Ismael Mokadem	(Saudi Arabia) Al Ula FC	€747 k	
27 July 2024	FW	(Morocco) El Mehdi Maouhoub	(Russia) Dynamo Moscow	€1,8 million	
10 August 2024	MF	(Morocco) Mohamed Al Makahasi	(Saudi Arabia) Al Wehda FC	Free agent	
27 September 2024	MF	(Ivory Coast) Hervé Guy	Unattached	Released	
27 September 2024	MF	(Guinea) Ahmadou Camara	(United Arab Emirates) Khor Fakkan Club	€350 k	
14 January 2025	GK	(Morocco) Anas Zniti	(United Arab Emirates) Al Wasl	Released	
11 February 2025	MF	(Morocco) Mohamed Zrida	(Libya) Al-Ittihad Tripoli	€500 k	
13 February 2025	FW	(Morocco) Nawfel Zerhouni	(Libya) Al-Ittihad Tripoli	€400 k	

== Pre-season and friendlies ==
On 4 July 2024, Raja CA announces its preparation schedule for the 2024–25 season. On 23 July, the team will fly to Tunisia where it will spend ten days before playing a friendly match against CA Bizertin. Finally, the preparation will end in Morocco with a match against Al Aïn FC.

3 August 2024 Friendly	CA Bizertin (Tunisia)	1–1	(Morocco) Raja CA	Tabarka, Tunisia
17:00	Jemmali 59'		Rahimi 49'	Attendance: 0

10 August 2024 Friendly	Raja CA (Morocco)	0–0	(United Arab Emirates) Al Ain FC	Casablanca
18:00		Report		Stadium: Stade Larbi Zaouli; Attendance: 0

25 August 2024 Friendly	Raja CA	2–0	Rachad Bernoussi	Casablanca
12:00	Rahimi	Report		Stadium: Raja CA Academy; Attendance: 0

Win Draw Loss Fixtures

== Competitions ==
=== Overview ===
Competition	First match	Last match	Starting round	Final position	Record							
Competition	First match	Last match	Starting round	Final position	Pld	W	D	L	GF	GA	GD	Win %
Botola	31 August 2024	12 May 2025	Matchday 1	5th	30	12	12	6	38	25	+13	40.00
Throne Cup	29 March 2025	5 April 2025	Round of 32	Round of 16	2	1	0	1	5	4	+1	50.00
Excellence Cup	4 September 2024	24 June 2025	Group stage	Third place	10	5	3	2	12	10	+2	50.00
CAF Champions League	17 August 2024	19 January 2025	First round	Group stage	10	5	3	2	15	8	+7	50.00
Total					52	23	18	11	70	47	+23	44.23

Last updated: 24 June 2025
Source: Sofascore

=== Botola ===
==== League table ====
Pos	Team	Pld	W	D	L	GF	GA	GD	Pts	Qualification or relegation
3	Wydad AC	30	14	12	4	45	27	+18	54	Qualification for Confederation Cup
4	FUS Rabat	30	14	8	8	53	26	+27	50	
5	Raja CA	30	12	12	6	38	25	+13	48	
6	RCA Zemamra	30	14	5	11	34	29	+5	47	
7	MAS Fès	30	12	10	8	34	29	+5	46	

Source: FRMF.ma
Rules for classification: 1) Points; 2a) Head-to-head goal difference if they are two teams with equal points; 2b) Goal difference if they are more than two teams with equal points; 3) Number of wins; 4) Goals scored; 5) Play-off between involved teams.

==== Results summary ====
Overall								Home						Away					
Pld	W	D	L	GF	GA	GD	Pts	W	D	L	GF	GA	GD	W	D	L	GF	GA	GD
30	12	12	6	38	25	+13	48	7	7	1	18	8	+10	5	5	5	20	17	+3

Source: Competitive matches

==== Results by round ====
Round	1	2	3	4	5	6	7	8	9	10	11	12	13	14	15	16	17	18	19	20	21	22	23	24	25	26	27	28	29	30
Ground	H	A	A	H	H	A	H	A	H	A	H	A	H	H	A	A	H	A	H	A	H	A	H	A	H	A	H	A	H	A
Result	L	L	W	W	W	L	D	D	D	D	D	W	W	W	L	L	D	L	D	W	W	D	D	W	D	D	W	D	W	W
Position	10	12	10	8	1	6	8	7	10	10	10	7	6	4	5	6	6	7	8	7	7	6	7	7	7	8	7	7	7	5

Updated to match(es) played on 12 May 2025. Source: Competitive matches
A = Away; H = Home; W = Win; D = Draw; L = Loss

==== Matches ====
30 August 2024 Round 1	Raja CA	0–1	RS Berkane	Casablanca
17:00		Report	El Mourabit 70'	Stadium: Stade Larbi Zaouli; Attendance: 10000; Referee: Mohamed El Baroudi

25 September 2024 Round 2	IR Tanger	3–1	Raja CA	Tetouan
18:00	El Harrak 4' 10'; Ghabra 44'	Report	Bouzok 79'	Stadium: Stade Saniat Rmel; Attendance: 0 Referee: Said Boujidi

29 September 2024 Round 4	OC Safi	2–3	Raja CA	Safi
18:00	Lamirat 32'; Samake 40'; El Bahraoui (red card) 85'	Report	Bouzok 20' 72' (pen.); Belammari 90'	Stadium: Stade El Massira; Attendance: 15000; Referee: Mohamed Lahouidri

2 October 2024 Round 3	Raja CA	1–0	Fath Union Sport	Casablanca
18:00	Bahsain 61' (o.g.)	Report		Stadium: Stade Larbi Zaouli; Attendance: 10000; Referee: Youssef Triki

6 October 2024 Round 5	Raja CA	2–0	RCA Zemamra	Casablanca
18:00	Boulacsoute 54'; Zerhouni 59'	Report		Stadium: Stade Larbi Zaouli; Attendance: 15000; Referee: Mohsine Sourdi

18 October 2024 Round 6	JS Soualem	2–1	Raja CA	Berrechid
20:00	Razko 63'; El Khaloui 90+2'	Report	Zrida 50'	Stadium: Stade Municipal de Berrechid; Attendance: 8000; Referee: Soulimane Atifi

22 October 2024 Round 7	Raja CA	0–0	AS FAR	Casablanca
20:00	Rahimi (penalty missed) 90+10'	Report		Stadium: Stade Larbi Zaouli; Attendance: 15000; Referee: Hicham Tamsamani

25 October 2024 Round 8	Maghreb de Fès	0–0	Raja CA	Fez
18:00		Report	Bikoro (red card) 45+3'	Stadium: Stade Hassan-II; Attendance: 5000; Referee: Achraf Berrada

2 November 2024 Round 9	Raja CA	0–0	COD Meknès	Casablanca
16:00		Report		Stadium: Stade Larbi Zaouli; Attendance: 15000; Referee: Abdelmouanim Baslam

9 November 2024 Round 10	Moghreb Tétouan	0–0	Raja CA	Tétouan
20:00		Report		Stadium: Stade Saniat Rmel; Attendance: 10000; Referee: Nawfal Nachit

22 November 2024 Round 11	Raja CA	1–1	Wydad AC	Casablanca
18:00	Sakho 54'	Report	Rayhi 79'	Stadium: Stade Larbi Zaouli; Attendance: 0 Referee: Karim Sabri

1 December 2024 Round 12	Hassania Agadir	1–3	Raja CA	Agadir
16:00	Kati 13'	Report	Ennafati 35' 90+1'; Najari 56'	Stadium: Stade Adrar; Attendance: 0 Referee: Azzedine Boulfaid

19 December 2024 Round 13	Raja CA	2–1	Union Touarga	Casablanca
20:00	Najari 64'; Ennafati 69'; Boulacsoute (yellow card) 62' (yellow-red card) 87'	Report	Essahel 33'	Stadium: Stade Larbi Zaouli; Attendance: 10000; Referee: Said Boujidi
Note: The match was rescheduled to this date due to Raja CA's match in the CAF Champions League

22 December 2024 Round 15	Raja CA	3–0	SCC Mohammédia	Casablanca
16:00	Ennafati 26' (pen.) 36'; Maamouri 60'			Stadium: Stade Larbi Zaouli; Attendance: 10000; Referee: Zouhir Kadim

25 December 2024 Round 14	Difaâ Hassani El Jadidi	2–0	Raja CA	El Jadida
20:00	Fatine 45+1'; Sahd 85'	Report		Stadium: Ben M'Hamed El Abdi Stadium; Attendance: 0 Referee: Hicham Tamsamani
Note: The match was rescheduled to this date due to Raja CA's match in the CAF Champions League

29 December 2024 Round 16	RS Berkane	2–0	Raja CA	Berkane
20:00	Khairi 9'; Dayo (pen.), 81'	Report		Stadium: Stade Municipal de Berkane; Attendance: 10000; Referee: Mohsine Sourdy

23 January 2025 Round 17	Raja CA	1–1	IR Tanger	Casablanca
18:00	Baadi 90+4'	Report	Bakkali 72'	Stadium: Stade Larbi Zaouli; Attendance: 10000; Referee: Hicham Tamsamani

26 January 2025 Round 18	Fath Union Sport	2–1	Raja CA	Mohammedia
20:00	Laalaoui 59'; Maouloua 84'	Report	Rahimi 42'	Stadium: Stade Bachir; Attendance: 0 Referee: Hamza Fareq

30 January 2025 Round 19	Raja CA	1–1	OC Safi	Casablanca
18:00	Rahimi 40'	Report	Qassaq 78'	Stadium: Stade Larbi Zaouli; Attendance: 10000; Referee: Azzedine Boulfaid

9 February 2025 Round 20	RCA Zemamra	1–2	Raja CA	Zemamra
16:00	Farah 77'	Report	Rahimi 3'; Ennafati 90+8' (pen.)	Stadium: Stade Ahmed Choukri; Attendance: 5000; Referee: Mohamed El Baroudi

15 February 2025 Round 21	Raja CA	2–0	JS Soualem	Casablanca
20:00	Rahimi 43'; Ennafati 90+7' (pen.)	Report		Stadium: Stade Larbi Zaouli; Attendance: 15000; Referee: Achraf Berrada

23 February 2025 Round 22	AS FAR	0–0	Raja CA	Kenitra
18:00		Report		Stadium: Kenitra Municipal Stadium; Attendance: 10000; Referee: Mohsine Sourdy

28 February 2025 Round 23	Raja CA	0–0	Maghreb de Fès	Casablanca
17:00		Report		Stadium: Stade Larbi Zaouli; Attendance: 15000; Referee: Abderrahim Errakhiz

10 March 2024 Round 24	COD Meknès	1–2	Raja CA	Meknès
22:00	Goulouss 46'	Report	Maamouri 61'; Rahimi 88'	Stadium: Honneur Stadium; Attendance: 20000; Referee: Said Bouzidi

16 March 2024 Round 25	Raja CA	1–1	Moghreb Tétouan	Casablanca
22:00	Rahimi 17'	Report	Darai 62'	Stadium: Stade Larbi Zaouli; Attendance: 15000; Referee: Azzedine Boulfaid

12 April 2025 Round 26	Wydad AC	1–1	Raja CA	Casablanca
20:00	Rayhi 18' (pen.)	Report	Rahimi 27'	Stadium: Stade Mohammed V Referee: Jalal Jiyed

23 April 2025 Round 27	Raja CA	1–0	Hassania Agadir	Casablanca
20:00	Rahimi 72'	Report	Ami (red card) 45+4'	Stadium: Stade Mohammed V Attendance: 15000; Referee: Amine El Maataoui

4 May 2025 Round 28	Union Touarga	0–0	Raja CA	Khemisset
20:00		Report		Stadium: 18 November Stadium; Attendance: 2000; Referee: Said Boujidi

8 May 2025 Round 29	Raja CA	3–2	Difaâ Hassani El Jadidi	Casablanca
20:00	Maamouri 14'; Boulacsoute 45+5'; Ennafati 73'	Report	Arbidi 39'; Majji 75'	Stadium: Stade Mohammed V Attendance: 8000; Referee: Abderrahim Errakhiz

12 May 2025 Round 30	SCC Mohammédia	0–6	Raja CA	Mohammedia
20:00		Report	Ennafati 39'; Belammari 45+4'; Rahimi 52' 63' 83'; Maamouri 54'	Stadium: Stade El Bachir; Attendance: 2000; Referee: Mohamed Tounssi

=== Throne Cup ===
29 March 2025 Round of 32	Raja CA	4–2	Raja Beni Mellal	Casablanca
22:00	Ennafati 2'; Bougrine 9'; Soussi 79'; Arrassi 90+9'	Report	Salhi 16'; Brighite 90+2'	Stadium: Stade Mohamed V Attendance: 15000; Referee: Nawfal Nachit

5 April 2025 Round of 16	USM Oujda	2–1 (a.e.t.)	Raja CA	Oujda
21:00	Aklidou 25'; Hamdaoui (red card) 113'; El Hmidi 117'	Report	Ennafati 72' (pen.); Boulacsoute (red card) 44'	Stadium: Honor Stadium; Attendance: 10000; Referee: Abdelmounaim Baslam

=== Excellence Cup ===
The Excellence Cup is a newly created competition by the National Professional Football League (LNFP). It is open to all the clubs from the two first divisions of the 2024–25 season. Its objectives are the integration and development of young players, the gradual recovery after the breaks and the maintenance of competition during the league's interruptions.

The clubs are required to register at least 10 U23 players on the match sheet and play at least 6 U23 players throughout the match. The competition begins with a group stage consisting of eight groups of four teams. The first two teams qualify for the elimination phase which is played in a two-legged format and begins with the round of 16.

==== Group stage ====
Groupe A ranking
Pos	Team	Pld	W	D	L	GF	GA	GD	Pts
1	Kénitra AC	6	3	2	1	9	4	+5	11
2	Raja CA	6	3	1	2	7	7	0	10
3	Olympique Khouribga	6	2	1	3	9	11	-2	7
4	Moghreb Tétouan	6	1	2	3	4	7	-3	5

4 September 2024	Raja CA U21	2–2	Kénitra AC	Casablanca
18:00	Laftah 40' (pen.); El Hamdaoui 78'	Report	Dadsi 29' 76'	Stadium: Stade Larbi Zaouli; Attendance: 3000; Referee: Ayoub Charhabil

7 September 2024	Olympique Khouribga	2–0	Raja CA U21	Khouribga
18:00	Zoubid 9' (o.g.); El Gaadaoui 32'	Report	Farid (red card) 52'	Stadium: Phosphate Stadium; Attendance: 3000; Referee: Abderrahim Errakhiz

9 October 2024	Moghreb Tétouan	0–1	Raja CA	Tétouan
20:00	Karmoun (red card) 37'	Report	Najari 14'	Stadium: Saniat Rmel Stadium; Attendance: 3000; Referee: Hassan Zgarha

13 October 2024	Kénitra AC	0–1	Raja CA	Kénitra
20:00	Likramme (red card) 28'; Khouidssi (red card) 74'	Report	Soussi 10'	Stadium: Kenitra Municipal Stadium; Attendance: 5000; Referee: Amine El Maataoui

2 February 2025	Raja CA	2–3	Olympique Khouribga	Casablanca
17:00	Aalam 4'; Nachet 90+10' (pen.)	Report	Essafi 27'; Kassou 52'; El Gaadaoui 90+5'	Stadium: Larbi Zaouli Stadium; Attendance: 2000

20 March 2025	Raja CA	1–0	Moghreb Tétouan	Casablanca
22:00	Laftah 65'	Report		Stadium: Larbi Zaouli Stadium; Attendance: 0

==== Knock-out stage ====
2 June 2025 Round of 16	RCA Zemamra	1–2	Raja CA	Zemamra
20:00	Gourad 44'	Report	Laftah 39'; Nachet 76' (pen.)	Stadium: Stade Ahmed Choukri; Attendance: 1000

11 June 2025 Quarter-final	Raja CA	2–1	COD Meknès	Casablanca
20:00	Nachet 43' (pen.), 59'	Report	Hammi 13'	Stadium: Stade Larbi Zaouli; Attendance: 3000

18 June 2025 Semi-final	Olympique Dcheira	0–0 (6–5 p)	Raja CA	Khemisset
19:00		Report		Stadium: 18 November Stadium

24 June 2025 Third place play-off	Wydad de Fès	1–1 (2–4 p)	Raja CA	Safi
19:00	Aanane 90+9'	Report	Azrour 79'	Stadium: Stade El Massira

=== CAF Champions League ===
==== Qualifying rounds ====
The draw of the qualifying rounds was held on 11 July 2024.

===== First round =====
17 August 2024	AS GNN (Niger)	1–2	(Morocco) Raja CA	Niamey
16:00 UTC+1	Jules 38' (pen.)	Report	Bougrine 22'; Zila 64'	Stadium: Stade Général Seyni Kountché; Referee: Godfrey Nkhakananga (Malawi)

24 August 2024	Raja CA (Morocco)	5–0	(Niger) AS GNN	Casablanca
20:00 UTC+1	Zrida 28'; Zerhouni 33'; Boulacsoute 45+2'; Ennafati 54'; Bougrine 67'	Report		Stadium: Stade Larbi Zaouli; Attendance: 10000; Referee: Abdoulaye Manet (Guinea)

===== Second round =====
15 September 2024	Samartex (Ghana)	2–2	(Morocco) Raja CA	Accra
15:00 UTC+1	Ephson 37', 44'	Report	Zrida 19' (yellow card) 70' (yellow-red card) 90+4'; Boulacsoute 63'	Stadium: Accra Sports Stadium; Attendance: 3000; Referee: Jelly Alfred Chavani (South Africa)

21 September 2024	Raja CA (Morocco)	2–0	(Ghana) Samartex	Casablanca
20:00 UTC+1	Zila 40'; Zerhouni 88'	Report		Stadium: Larbi Zaouli Stadium; Attendance: 15000; Referee: Messie Nkounkou (Congo)

==== Group stage ====
The group stage draw was held on 7 October 2024.

Group B

Pos	Team	Pld	W	D	L	GF	GA	GD	Pts	Qualification	FAR	MSFC	RCA	MUN
1	(Morocco) AS FAR	6	2	4	0	8	4	+4	10	Advance to knockout stage	—	1–1	1–1	2–0
2	(South Africa) Mamelodi Sundowns	6	2	3	1	5	4	+1	9	Advance to knockout stage	1–1	—	1–0	0–0
3	(Morocco) Raja CA	6	2	2	2	4	5	−1	8		0–2	1–0	—	1–0
4	(Democratic Republic of the Congo) AS Maniema Union	6	0	3	3	3	7	−4	3		1–1	1–2	1–1	—

Source: CAF
Rules for classification: Group stage tiebreakers

26 November 2024	Raja CA (Morocco)	0–2	(Morocco) AS FAR	Larbi Zaouli Stadium, Casablanca
20:00 UTC+1	Bougrine (penalty missed) 75	Report	Hammoudan 41'; Aït Ouarkhane 90+7'	Attendance: 15000; Referee: Issa Sy (Senegal)

7 December 2024	AS Maniema Union (Democratic Republic of the Congo)	1–1	(Morocco) Raja CA	Stade des Martyrs, Kinshasa
14:00 UTC+1	Bakasu 79'	Report	Najari 17'	Attendance: 5000; Referee: Mahmood Ismail (Sudan)

15 December 2024	Mamelodi Sundowns (South Africa)	1–0	(Morocco) Raja CA	Loftus Versfeld Stadium, Pretoria
15:00 UTC+2	Rayners 65'	Report		Attendance: 10000; Referee: Pierre Atcho (Gabon)

4 January 2025	Raja CA (Morocco)	1–0	(South Africa) Mamelodi Sundowns	Larbi Zaouli Stadium, Casablanca
20:00 UTC+1	Benamar 45+2'; Zila (yellow card) 80' (yellow-red card) 81'	Report	(red card) 40' Aubaas; (red card) 90+5' Mudau	Attendance: 15000; Referee: Abdel Aziz Mohamed Bouh (Mauritania)

11 January 2025	AS FAR (Morocco)	1–1	(Morocco) Raja CA	Honneur Stadium, Meknes
20:00 UTC+1	Zniti 40' (o.g.)	Report	Zerhouni 77' (pen.)	Attendance: 10000; Referee: Mohamed Maarouf (Egypt)

19 January 2025	Raja CA (Morocco)	1–0	(Democratic Republic of the Congo) AS Maniema Union	Larbi Zaouli Stadium, Casablanca
17:00 UTC+1	Ennafati 45+5' (pen.)	Report		Attendance: 15000; Referee: Andofetra Rakotojaona (Madagascar)

== Squad information ==
=== Goals ===
Includes all competitive matches. The list is sorted alphabetically by surname when total goals are equal.

Rank	Pos.	Player	Botola	Throne Cup	Excellence Cup	Champions League	Total
1	AM	(Morocco) Adam Ennafati	9	2	0	2	13
2	FW	(Morocco) Houssine Rahimi	11	0	0	0	11
3	DF	(Morocco) Mohamed Boulacsoute	2	0	0	2	4
4	FW	(Morocco) Ayoub Maamouri	4	0	0	0	4
5	FW	(Morocco) Younes Najari	2	0	1	1	4
6	FW	(Morocco) Nawfel Zerhouni	1	0	0	3	4
7	FW	(Morocco) Mansour Nachet	0	0	4	0	4
8	AM	(Morocco) Sabir Bougrine	0	1	0	2	3
9	FW	(Algeria) Yousri Bouzok	3	0	0	0	3
10	MF	(Morocco) Mohamed Zrida	1	0	0	2	3
11	FW	(Morocco) Azzeddine Laftah	0	0	3	0	3
12	DF	(Morocco) Youssef Belammari	2	0	0	0	2
13	FW	(Morocco) Marouane Zila	0	0	0	2	2
14	FW	(Morocco) Abderahmane Soussi	0	1	1	0	2
15	FW	(Senegal) Pape Ousmane Sakho	1	0	0	0	1
16	DF	(Morocco) Benaissa Benamar	0	0	0	1	1
17	DF	(Morocco) Abdelkrim Baadi	1	0	0	0	1
18	DF	(Morocco) Bouchaib Arrassi	0	1	0	0	1
19	FW	(Morocco) Anouar Aalam	0	0	1	0	1
20	FW	(Morocco) Oussama El Hamdaoui	0	0	1	0	1
21	DF	(Morocco) Abdellah Azrour	0	0	1	0	1
Own goals			1	0	0	0	1
Total			38	5	12	15	70

=== Assists ===
Rank	Pos.	Player	Botola	Throne Cup	Excellence Cup	Champions League	Total
1	AM	(Morocco) Adam Ennafati	7	1	0	1	9
2	FW	(Morocco) Nawfel Zerhouni	3	0	0	4	7
3	DF	(Morocco) Youssef Belammari	3	0	0	3	6
4	AM	(Morocco) Sabir Bougrine	4	0	0	2	6
5	FW	(Morocco) Ayoub Maamouri	4	2	0	0	6
6	DF	(Morocco) Mohamed Boulacsoute	2	0	0	1	3
7	FW	(Algeria) Yousri Bouzok	2	0	0	1	3
8	FW	(Senegal) Pape Ousmane Sakho	3	0	0	0	3
9	MF	(Morocco) Mohamed Zrida	2	0	0	0	2
10	DF	(Morocco) Abdelkrim Baadi	0	1	0	0	1
11	FW	(Morocco) Younes Najari	1	0	0	0	1
12	MF	(Ivory Coast) Hervé Guy	0	0	0	1	1
13	FW	(Morocco) Karim Ouhammou	0	0	1	0	1

=== Clean sheets ===
No.	Player	Botola	Throne Cup	Excellence Cup	Champions League	Total
12	(Morocco) El Mehdi Al Harrar	9	0	1	1	11
1	(Morocco) Anas Zniti	4	0	0	3	7
Total		13	0	1	4	18
