= 2023–24 Raja CA season =

Raja CA
2023–24 season
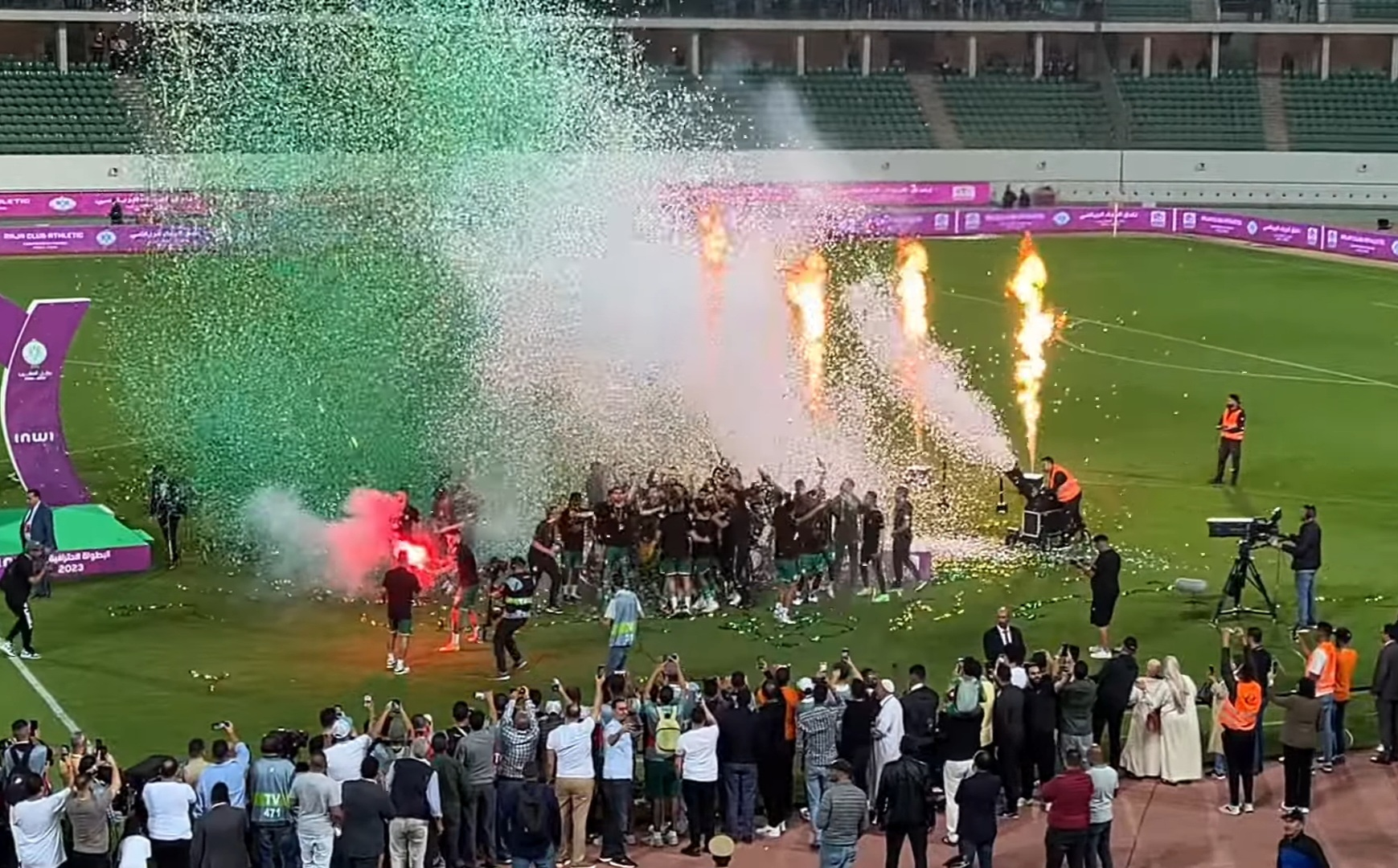
- Raja CA players celebrating their undefeated Botola title
- President: Mohamed Boudrika
- Manager: Josef Zinnbauer
- Stadium: Stade Mohammed V (until 6 November 2023); Stade Municipal de Berrechid (since 9 December 2023)
- Botola: 1st
- Throne Cup: Winners
- Arab Club Champions Cup: Quarter-finals
- Top goalscorer: League: Yousri Bouzok (14); All: Yousri Bouzok (16)
- Biggest win: 6–1 vs IR Tanger, Botola, 28 December 2023
- Biggest defeat: 3–1 vs Al Nassr, Arab Club Champions Cup, 6 August 2023
Home colours	Away colours	Third colours

The 2023–24 season was Raja Club Athletic's 75th season in existence and the club's 67th consecutive season in the top flight of Moroccan football. In addition to the domestic league, they also participated in the season's editions of the Throne Cup and Arab Club Champions Cup. For the majority of the season, the club's matches were played at Stade Municipal de Berrechid due to the renovation of Stade Mohammed V for the 2025 Africa Cup of Nations.

Raja CA kicked off the season with a 2–1 win over CR Belouizdad in the first group stage of the 2023 Arab Club Champions Cup. On 14 June 2024, after a 0–3 win against MC Oujda in the last round, Raja were crowned champions ending the season without a single defeat – the first team ever to do so in the history of the league and breaking the record of points (72). On July 1, Raja beat AS FAR once again in the Throne Cup final to secure the third domestic double of its history.

== Coaching staff ==
Position	Staff
Head coach	(Germany) Josef Zinnbauer
1st Assistant coach	(South Africa) Fadlu Davids
2nd Assistant coach	(South Africa) Darian Wilken
First-team goalkeeping coach	(Ivory Coast) Stephan Loboué
First-team fitness coach	(Tunisia) Omar Benounis
Video Analyst	(Switzerland) Marc Chervaz
Performance Analyst	(South Africa) Mueez Kajee
Club doctor	(Morocco) Dr. Hakim Ait Lahcen
Head Physiotherapist	(Morocco) Mustapha Jazouli
Match delegate	(Morocco) Mustapha Tantaoui

== Players ==
=== First-team squad ===
Players and squad numbers last updated on 31 January 2024.
Note: Flags indicate national team as has been defined under FIFA eligibility rules. Players may hold more than one non-FIFA nationality.

No.	Name	Nat.	Position	Date of Birth (Age)	Signed from
Goalkeepers
1	Anas Zniti	(Morocco)	GK	28 October 1988 (aged 35)	(Morocco) AS FAR
32	Yassine Zoubir	(Morocco)	GK	24 February 2002 (aged 22)	(Morocco) Youth system
22	Mohamed Baayou	(Morocco)	GK	11 January 1993 (aged 31)	(Morocco) AS FAR
Defenders
5	Abdellah Khafifi	(Morocco)	CB	19 February 1993 (aged 31)	(Qatar) Umm Salal
4	Ismael Mokadem	(Morocco)	CB	26 July 1995 (aged 28)	(Morocco) Renaissance Berkane
28	Bouchaib Arrassi	(Morocco)	CB	6 January 2000 (aged 24)	(Morocco) Youth system
33	Mehdi Mchakhchekh	(Morocco)	CB	23 February 2004 (aged 20)	(Morocco) Youth system
27	Mohamed Boulacsoute	(Morocco)	RB / RW / LW	23 September 1998 (aged 25)	(Morocco) Chabab Mohammédia
17	Youssef Belammari	(Morocco)	LB / LM	20 September 1998 (aged 25)	(Morocco) Fath US
3	Zakaria Labib	(Morocco)	LB	28 February 2003 (aged 20)	(Morocco) Youth system
Midfielders
6	El Mehdi Moubarik	(Morocco)	DM / CM	22 January 2001 (aged 23)	(United Arab Emirates) Al Ain FC
30	Ahmadou Camara	(Guinea)	DM / CM	1 August 2003 (aged 20)	(Morocco) Youth system
19	Mohamed Zrida	(Morocco)	CM / AM / LM	1 February 1999 (aged 25)	(Morocco) Youth system
10	Zakaria El Wardi	(Morocco)	DM / CM / AM	17 August 1998 (aged 25)	(Egypt) Zamalek SC
23	Mohamed Al Makahasi	(Morocco)	CM / DM	5 February 1995 (aged 29)	(Morocco) Moghreb Tétouan
31	Haashim Domingo	(South Africa)	AM / CF	13 August 1995 (aged 28)	(South Africa) Mamelodi Sundowns
34	Sabir Bougrine	(Morocco)	AM / CM	10 July 1996 (aged 27)	(Tunisia) Espérance de Tunis
77	Adam Ennafati	(Morocco)	AM / LW / RW	29 June 1994 (aged 30)	(Morocco) AS FAR
71	Hervé Guy	(Ivory Coast)	DM / CM	17 September 1991 (aged 32)	(Morocco) Fath US
Forwards
11	Nawfel Zerhouni	(Morocco)	RW / LW / ST	25 September 1995 (aged 27)	(Saudi Arabia) Al-Hazem
26	Yousri Bouzok	(Algeria)	RW / LW	18 August 1996 (aged 27)	(Algeria) Paradou AC
97	Marouane Zila	(Morocco)	LW / RW	13 June 1997 (aged 27)	(Morocco) Chabab Mohammédia
49	El Mehdi Maouhoub	(Morocco)	ST	5 June 2003 (aged 21)	(Morocco) Fath US
21	Víctor Ábrego	(Bolivia)	ST / LW	11 February 1997 (aged 27)	(Bolivia) Universitario de Vinto
9	Riad Benayad	(Algeria)	ST	2 November 1996 (aged 27)	(Tunisia) Espérance de Tunis

=== New contracts ===
Date	Position	No.	Player	Ref.
4 June 2023	MF	18	(Togo) Roger Aholou	
12 July 2023	GK	1	(Morocco) Anas Zniti	
23 August 2023	FW	26	(Algeria) Yousri Bouzok	
2 September 2023	DF	27	(Morocco) Mohamed Boulacsoute	
8 September 2023	GK	89	(Morocco) Marouane Fakhr	

== Transfers ==
=== In ===
Date	Pos '	Player	Moving from	Fee	Ref.
21 June 2023	AM	(South Africa) Haashim Domingo	(South Africa) Mamelodi Sundowns	Undisclosed	
21 June 2023	DF	(Morocco) Abdellah Khafifi	(United Arab Emirates) Umm Salal	Free agent	
2 July 2023	MF	(Morocco) Youssef Belammari	Fath US	Free agent	
18 July 2023	AM	(Morocco) Adam Ennafati	AS FAR	Free agent	
22 July 2023	FW	(Morocco) Nawfel Zerhouni	(Saudi Arabia) Al-Hazem F.C.	Undisclosed	
18 August 2023	GK	(Morocco) Mohamed Baayou	AS FAR	Free agent	
21 August 2023	FW	(Iraq) Aymen Hussein	(United Arab Emirates) Al Jazira	Undisclosed	
29 August 2023	AM	(Morocco) Sabir Bougrine	(Tunisia) Espérance de Tunis	Free agent	
31 August 2023	FW	(Morocco) El Mehdi Maouhoub	Fath US	$300k	
7 September 2023	FW	(Morocco) Marouane Zila	SCC Mohammédia	Free agent	
1 July 2023	FW	(Algeria) Mehdi Boukassi	(Finland) FC Haka	End of loan	
1 July 2023	MF	(Morocco) Abdelhay El Forsy	OC Safi	End of loan	
1 July 2023	FW	(Gabon) Axel Méyé	OC Safi	End of loan	
1 July 2023	GK	(Algeria) Gaya Merbah	IR Tanger	End of loan	
1 July 2023	DF	(Morocco) Mohamed Souboul	IR Tanger	End of loan	
1 July 2023	DF	(Morocco) Oussama Soukhane	Difaâ El Jadidi	End of loan	
1 July 2023	FW	(Morocco) Abdellah Farah	Difaâ El Jadidi	End of loan	
1 July 2023	FW	(The Gambia) Gibril Sillah	JS Soualem	End of loan	
1 July 2023	GK	(Morocco) Youssef Lahouizi	JS Soualem	End of loan	
1 July 2023	DF	(Morocco) Mohamed Naim	JS Massira	End of loan	
19 December 2023	FW	(Bolivia) Víctor Ábrego	(Bolivia) Universitario de Vinto	Undisclosed	
19 December 2023	MF	(Ivory Coast) Hervé Guy	Fath US	Free agent	
13 January 2024	DF	(Morocco) Anouar Tamoun	AS FAR	Undisclosed	
16 January 2024	DF	(Morocco) Zakaria Labib	JS Soualem	End of loan	

=== Out ===
Date	Pos '	Player	Moving to	Fee	Ref.
28 May 2023	MF	(Algeria) Abdelraouf Benguit	(Algeria) CR Belouizdad	Released	
28 June 2023	FW	(The Gambia) Gibril Sillah	(Tanzania) Azam FC	$100k	
30 June 2023	FW	(Morocco) Hamza Khabba	(Kuwait) Al-Arabi SC	End of loan	
10 July 2023	FW	(Morocco) Nawfel Zerhouni	(Saudi Arabia) Al-Hazem F.C.	End of loan	-
10 July 2023	DF	(Morocco) Marouane Hadhoudi	(Azerbaijan) Sabah FC	End of contract	
10 July 2023	MF	(Morocco) Abdelilah Hafidi	Unattached	End of contract	-
23 July 2023	DF	(Morocco) Mohamed Ali Manali	Unattached	Released	-
25 July 2023	DF	(Morocco) Mohamed Nahiri	Unattached	End of contract	
25 July 2023	FW	(Morocco) Zakaria Hadraf	Unattached	Released	
25 July 2023	DF	(Morocco) Oussama Soukhane	Fath US	Released	
26 July 2023	FW	(Morocco) Zakaria Habti	Unattached	Released	-
31 July 2023	GK	(Algeria) Gaya Merbah	IR Tanger	$400k	
12 August 2023	DF	(Morocco) Mahmoud Bentayg	(France) AS Saint-Étienne	$600k	
13 August 2023	DF	(Morocco) Walid Sabbar	Unattached	End of contract	
17 August 2023	DF	(Morocco) Abdelilah Madkour	RS Berkane	End of contract	
18 August 2023	GK	(Morocco) Marouane Fakhr	Unattached	Released	
18 August 2023	GK	(Morocco) Amir El Haddaoui	Unattached	Released	
18 August 2023	GK	(Morocco) Youssef Lahouizi	Unattached	Released	
27 August 2023	FW	(Morocco) Soufiane Benjdida	(Belgium) Standard de Liège	Undisclosed	
28 August 2023	DF	(Morocco) Jamal Harkass	Unattached	Released	
7 September 2023	DF	(Morocco) Ayoub Chaboud	MA Tétouan	Undisclosed	
3 October 2023	FW	(Iraq) Aymen Hussein	Al-Quwa Al-Jawiya	Released	
24 December 2023	DF	(Morocco) Abdessamad Badaoui	Unattached	Released	
27 December 2023	MF	(Togo) Roger Aholou	(Tunisia) Espérance de Tunis	Released	
31 December 2023	DF	(Morocco) Mohamed Souboul	(France) SC Bastia	$200k	
31 January 2024	GK	(Morocco) Marouane Fakhr	RCA Zemamra	Released	

=== Loans in ===
Start date	End date	Pos '	Player	Moving from	Fee	Ref.
18 August 2023	End of season	MF	(Morocco) El Mehdi El Moubarik	(United Arab Emirates) Al Ain FC	None	
31 January 2024	End of season	FW	(Algeria) Riad Benayad	(Tunisia) Espérance de Tunis	None	

=== Loans out ===
Start date	End date	Pos '	Player	Moving to	Fee	Ref.
2 September 2023	End of season	MF	(Morocco) Abdelhay El Forsy	RCA Zemamra	None	
7 September 2023	End of season	FW	(Morocco) Abdellah Farah	MA Tétouan	None	
7 September 2023	End of season	MF	(Morocco) Taha El Achbili	CAY Berrechid	None	
8 September 2023	End of season	DF	(Morocco) Zakaria Labib	JS Soualem	None	
8 September 2023	End of season	FW	(Morocco) Houssine Rahimi	JS Soualem	None	

== Pre-season and friendlies ==
Win Draw Loss Fixtures

21 July 2023 Friendly	Al-Sadd SC (Qatar)	2–2	(Morocco) Raja CA	Al Rayyan, Qatar
17:00 UTC+1	Al Haydos 28'; Bounedjah 32'	Report	Khafifi 53'; Bouzok 68'	Stadium: Jassim bin Hamad Stadium; Attendance: 10000

20 August 2023 Friendly	Raja CA	1–0	RCA Zemamra	Casablanca, Morocco
12:00 UTC+1	Mchakhchekh 38'			Stadium: Raja CA Academy; Attendance: 0

13 October 2023 Friendly	Raja CA	2–0	RCA Zemamra	Casablanca, Morocco
15:00 UTC+1	Domingo; Zrida			Stadium: Raja CA Academy; Attendance: 0

18 October 2023 Friendly	Raja CA	2–0	Tihad AS	Casablanca, Morocco
15:00 UTC+1	Ennafati; Zila			Stadium: Stade Larbi Zaouli; Attendance: 0

21 October 2023 Friendly	Raja CA	3–2	IR Tanger	Casablanca, Morocco
15:00 UTC+1	Ennafati; Zerhouni; Al Makahasi			Stadium: Stade Larbi Zaouli; Attendance: 0

23 January 2024 Friendly	Al-Ahli (Saudi Arabia)	0–1	(Morocco) Raja CA	Dubai, UAE
15:00		Report	Zerhouni 76'	Attendance: 0

26 January 2024 Dubai Challenge Cup	Zamalek (Egypt)	2–2 (4–2 p)	(Morocco) Raja CA	Dubai, UAE
15:00	Hamdy 2'; Shikabala 6'	Report	Zerhouni 67' (pen.); Bouzok 88' (pen.)	Stadium: Al-Maktoum Stadium; Attendance: 7000; Referee: Sultan Mohamed Saleh
	Penalties
			(penalty missed) Mokadem; (penalty scored) Ennafati; (penalty scored) Zrida; (penalty missed) Bouzok

28 January 2024 Dubai Challenge Cup	Wuhan Three Towns (China)	0–1	(Morocco) Raja CA	Dubai, UAE
13:00		Report	Maouhoub 28' (pen.)	Stadium: Al-Maktoum Stadium; Attendance: 1000

== Competitions ==
=== Overview ===
Competition	First match	Last match	Starting round	Final position	Record							
Competition	First match	Last match	Starting round	Final position	Pld	W	D	L	GF	GA	GD	Win %
Botola	28 August 2023	14 June 2024	Matchday 1	Winners	30	21	9	0	52	15	+37	70.00
Throne Cup	30 March 2024	1 July 2024	Round of 32	Winners	5	5	0	0	13	6	+7	100.00
Arab Club Champions Cup	28 July 2023	6 August 2023	Group stage	Quarter-finals	4	3	0	1	6	4	+2	75.00
Total					39	29	9	1	71	25	+46	74.36

Last updated: 1 July 2024
Source: Sofascore

=== Botola ===
==== League table ====
Pos	Team	Pld	W	D	L	GF	GA	GD	Pts	Qualification or relegation
1	Raja CA (C, Q)	30	21	9	0	52	15	+37	72	Qualification for Champions League
2	AS FAR (Q)	30	22	5	3	65	22	+43	71	Qualification for Champions League
3	RS Berkane (Q)	30	14	10	6	38	23	+15	52	Qualification for Confederation Cup
4	Union de Touarga (Q)	30	12	8	10	36	33	+3	44 (Note: Union de Touarga finished ahead of Olympic Safi and Wydad AC on head-to-head points: Union de Touarga 7, Olympic Safi 6, Wydad AC 4)	Qualification for Confederation Cup
5	Olympic Safi	30	11	11	8	29	26	+3	44	

Source: FRMF.ma
Rules for classification: 1) Points; 2a) Head-to-head goal difference if they are two teams with equal points; 2b) Goal difference if they are more than two teams with equal points; 3) Number of wins; 4) Goals scored; 5) Play-off between involved teams.
(C) Champions; (Q) Qualified for the phase indicated

==== Results summary ====
Overall								Home						Away					
Pld	W	D	L	GF	GA	GD	Pts	W	D	L	GF	GA	GD	W	D	L	GF	GA	GD
30	21	9	0	52	15	+37	72	14	1	0	30	5	+25	7	8	0	22	10	+12

Source: Competitive matches

==== Results by round ====
Round	1	2	3	4	5	6	7	8	9	10	11	12	13	14	15	16	17	18	19	20	21	22	23	24	25	26	27	28	29	30
Ground	A	H	A	H	A	H	A	H	A	H	H	A	H	A	H	H	A	H	A	H	A	H	A	H	A	A	H	A	H	A
Result	W	D	D	W	D	W	D	W	D	W	W	D	W	W	W	W	D	W	D	W	D	W	W	W	W	W	W	W	W	W
Position	1	4	4	2	5	4	4	3	2	1	2	2	1	1	1	1	1	1	2	1	2	2	2	2	2	2	2	2	1	1

Updated to match(es) played on 14 June 2024. Source: Competitive matches
A = Away; H = Home; W = Win; D = Draw; L = Loss

==== Matches ====
27 August 2023 Round 1	Youssoufia Berrechid	1–3	Raja CA	Berrechid
19:15	El Hamzaoui 3'	Report	Zerhouni 37'; El Wardi 47' 82'	Stadium: Stade Municipal de Berrechid; Attendance: 5000; Referee: Mohamed El Houidri

3 September 2023 Round 2	Raja CA	2–2	FAR Rabat	Casablanca
17:00	Bouzok 22' (pen.) 33'; Khafifi (red card) 36'	Report	Hrimat 29' (pen.); Habti 80' (yellow card) 81' (yellow-red card) 90+5'	Stadium: Stade Mohammed V Attendance: 45000; Referee: Redouane Jiyed

17 September 2023 Round 3	Maghreb de Fès	1–1	Raja CA	Fez
19:15	Aina 63'	Report	Arrassi 72'	Stadium: Fez Stadium; Attendance: 25000; Referee: Daki Reddad

24 September 2023 Round 4	Raja CA	1–0	Union Touarga	Casablanca
19:15	Bouzok 84'	Report		Stadium: Stade Mohammed V Attendance: 30000; Referee: Hamza Fareq

1 October 2023 Round 5	Hassania Agadir	1–1	Raja CA	Agadir
16:00	Bouzok 56'	Report	Bakhkhach 29'	Stadium: Stade Adrar; Attendance: 5000; Referee: Samir Guezzaz

8 October 2023 Round 6	Raja CA	1–0	Moghreb Tétouan	Casablanca
20:30	Ennafati 53'	Report	Moudden (red card) 51'	Stadium: Stade Mohammed V Attendance: 40000; Referee: Nabil Benrkia

28 October 2023 Round 7	OC Safi	2–2	Raja CA	Marrakesh
18:15	Yechou 52'; El Bahraoui 83'	Report	Makahasi 49'; Badaoui 90+6'	Stadium: Marrakesh Stadium; Attendance: 0 Referee: Youssef Triki

6 November 2023 Round 8	Raja CA	2–0	Fath Union Sport	Casablanca
17:00	Ennafati 3' 64'	Report		Stadium: Stade Mohammed V Attendance: 0 Referee: Redouane Jiyed

11 November 2023 Round 9	JS Soualem	0–0	Raja CA	Mohammedia
18:15		Report		Stadium: Stade El Bachir; Attendance: 10000; Referee: Mohamed El Baroudi

26 November 2023 Round 10	Raja CA	1–0	SCC Mohammédia	El Jadida
15:00	Zerhouni 64' (pen.)	Report		Stadium: Stade El Abdi; Attendance: 2000; Referee: Mohamed Lahouidri

9 December 2023 Round 11	Raja CA	2–1	RCA Zemamra	Berrechid
15:00	Bougrine 39'; Zerhouni 45+3'	Report	Bahrou 30'	Stadium: Stade Municipal de Berrechid; Attendance: 3000; Referee: Yassine Bouslim

24 December 2023 Round 12	RS Berkane	1–1	Raja CA	Berkane
18:00	Zerhouni 18'	Report	Fahli 87'	Stadium: Stade Municipal de Berkane; Attendance: 10000; Referee: Hamza Fareq

28 December 2023 Round 13	Raja CA	6–1	IR Tanger	Berrechid
16:00	Zerhouni 3' 62' 73'; Bouzok 16' 28' 69'	Report	Khafi 88'	Stadium: Stade Municipal de Berrechid; Attendance: 3000

3 January 2024 Round 14	Wydad AC	0–2	Raja CA	Mohammedia
16:00			Ait Brayem 51' (o.g.); Zrida 65'	Stadium: Stade El Bachir; Attendance: 0 Referee: Jalal Jayid

6 January 2024 Round 15	Raja CA	2–0	MC Oujda	Berrechid
18:00	Bougrine 64'; Maouhoub 90+1'	Report		Stadium: Stade Municipal de Berrechid; Attendance: 0 Referee: Mohamed Baroudi

8 February 2024 Round 16	Raja CA	2–0	Youssoufia Berrechid	Berrechid
16:00	Belammari 10'; Maouhoub 90+1'	Report		Stadium: Stade Municipal de Berrechid; Attendance: 0 Referee: Hamza Fareq

11 February 2024 Round 17	FAR Rabat	1–1	Raja CA	Kenitra
16:00	Orebonye 77'	Report	Igamane 10' (o.g.)	Stadium: Stade municipal de Kenitra; Attendance: 8000; Referee: Daki Reddad

14 February 2024 Round 18	Raja CA	1–0	Maghreb de Fès	Berrechid
18:00	Ennafati 35'; Maouhoub (yellow card) 37' (yellow-red card) 45+1'			Stadium: Stade Municipal de Berrechid; Attendance: 8000; Referee: Mohamed Lahouidri

17 February 2024 Round 19	Union Touarga	0–0	Raja CA	Rabat
20:00		Report		Stadium: Stade Moulay Hassan; Attendance: 4000; Referee: Hicham Tamsamani

20 February 2024 Round 20	Raja CA	2–0	Hassania Agadir	Berrechid
16:00	Maouhoub 45+1'; Maouhoub 76'	Report		Stadium: Stade Municipal de Berrechid; Attendance: 8000; Referee: Abderrahim Errakhiz

24 February 2024 Round 21	Moghreb Tétouan	1–1	Raja CA	Tétouan
18:00	Goulouss 84'	Report	Maouhoub 7'	Stadium: Stade Saniat Rmel; Attendance: 15000; Referee: Youssef Triki

3 March 2024 Round 22	Raja CA	1–0	OC Safi	Berrechid
18:00	Benayad 84'	Report		Stadium: Stade Municipal de Berrechid; Attendance: 0 Referee: Daki Reddad

10 March 2024 Round 23	Fath Union Sport	0–1	Raja CA	Rabat
17:00		Report	Maouhoub 28'	Stadium: Stade Moulay Hassan; Attendance: 2000; Referee: Hamza Fareq

16 March 2024 Round 24	Raja CA	3–1	JS Soualem	Berrechid
22:00	Maouhoub 44'; Bouzok 83'; Ennafati 90+6'	Report	Rahimi 90+2'	Stadium: Stade Municipal de Berrechid; Attendance: 0 Referee: Bouchra Karboubi

14 April 2024 Round 25	SCC Mohammédia	0–2	Raja CA	Mohammedia
21:00		Report	Maouhoub 3'; Bouzok 63'	Stadium: Stade El Bachir; Attendance: 1000; Referee: Daki Reddad

21 April 2024 Round 26	RCA Zemamra	1–2	Raja CA	Zemamra
21:00	Khoutari 51'	Report	Ennafati 1'; Boulacsoute 76'	Stadium: Stade Ahmed Choukri; Attendance: 0 Referee: Youssef Triki

24 May 2024 Round 27	Raja CA	3–0	RS Berkane	Berrechid
19:00	Bouzok 31' 68'; Khafifi 82'	Report		Stadium: Stade Municipal de Berrechid; Attendance: 6000; Referee: Hamza Fareq

28 May 2024 Round 28	IR Tanger	1–2	Raja CA	Tétouan
19:00	Bouzok 74' (pen.); Benayad 85'	Report	Khafi 57'	Stadium: Stade Saniat Rmel; Attendance: 0 Referee: Bouchra Karboubi

2 June 2024 Round 29	Raja CA	1–0	Wydad AC	Berrechid
18:00	Ennafati 90+2'	Report	Aboulfath (yellow card) 90+3' (yellow-red card) 90+4'; Bouhra (red card) 90+4'	Stadium: Stade Municipal de Berrechid; Attendance: 0 Referee: Karim Sabri

14 June 2024 Round 30	MC Oujda	0–3	Raja CA	Oujda
18:00		Report	Khafifi 34'; Bouzok 45+1' (pen.) 64' (pen.)	Stadium: Honneur Stadium; Attendance: 20000; Referee: Hamza Fareq

=== Throne Cup ===
30 March 2024 Round of 32	Raja CA	2–0	OC Safi	Berrechid
22:00	Ferhani 73' (o.g.); Mokadem 90'	Report		Stadium: Stade Municipal de Berrechid; Attendance: 10000; Referee: Hicham Tamsamani

6 April 2024 Round of 16	SCC Mohammédia	0–1	Raja CA	Mohammedia
22:00		Report	Belammari 42'	Stadium: Stade El Bachir; Attendance: 5000; Referee: Mohamed El Baroudi

11 May 2024 Quarter-finals	Hassania Agadir	2–4	Raja CA	Agadir
17:00	Boukhanfer 7'; El Belghiti 89'	Report	Maouhoub 10'; Bèye 25' (o.g.); Ennafati 45'; Zerhouni 73'	Stadium: Stade Adrar; Attendance: 5000; Referee: Hicham Tamsamani

25 June 2024 Semi-finals	Raja CA	4–3 (a.e.t.)	MC Oujda	Agadir
20:00	Zerhouni 20' 29'; Benayad 109' 120'	Report	Anouar 9' 98' (pen.); Faidi 70'	Stadium: Stade Adrar; Attendance: 25000; Referee: Mohsine Sourdi

1st July 2024 Final	AS FAR	1–2	Raja CA	Agadir
17:00	Zouhzouh 29'	Report	Bouzok 5'; Boulacsoute 79'	Stadium: Stade Adrar; Attendance: 25000; Referee: Redouane Jiyed

=== Arab Club Champions Cup ===
==== Group stage ====
Pos	Team	Pld	W	D	L	GF	GA	GD	Pts	Qualification
1	(Morocco) Raja CA	3	3	0	0	5	1	+4	9	Advance to knockout stage
2	(United Arab Emirates) Al-Wahda	3	2	0	1	4	3	+1	6	Advance to knockout stage
3	(Algeria) CR Belouizdad	3	0	1	2	3	5	−2	1	
4	Kuwait SC	3	0	1	2	2	5	−3	1	

Source: UAFA

28 July 2023 1	CR Belouizdad (Algeria)	1–2	(Morocco) Raja CA	Abha, Saudi Arabia
14:00 UTC+1	Hadded 10'	Report	Bouzok 58' (pen.); Arrassi 90+4'	Stadium: Prince Sultan bin Abdul Aziz Stadium, Abha; Attendance: 5000; Referee: Ali Sabah (Iraq)

31 July 2023 2	Raja CA (Morocco)	2–0	Kuwait SC	Abha, Saudi Arabia
18:00 UTC+1	Rahimi 52'; Zrida 63'	Report		Stadium: Prince Sultan bin Abdul Aziz Stadium, Abha; Attendance: 3000; Referee: Amin Omar (Egypt)

3 August 2023 3	Al-Wahda (United Arab Emirates)	0–1	(Morocco) Raja CA	Abha, Saudi Arabia
14:00 UTC+1		Report	El Wardi 26'	Stadium: Prince Sultan bin Abdul Aziz Stadium, Abha; Attendance: 3000; Referee: Mohammed Al Hoaish (Saudi Arabia)

==== Knockout phase ====
6 August 2023 Quarter-finals	Raja CA (Morocco)	1–3	(Saudi Arabia) Al Nassr	Abha, Saudi Arabia
16:00 UTC+1	Madu 41' (o.g.)	Report	Ronaldo 19'; S. Al-Ghannam 29'; Fofana 38'	Stadium: Prince Sultan bin Abdul Aziz Stadium, Abha; Attendance: 25000; Referee: Mahmoud El Banna (Egypt)

== Squad information ==
As of match played 1 July 2024

=== Goals ===
Includes all competitive matches. The list is sorted alphabetically by surname when total goals are equal.

Rank	Pos.	Player	Botola	Throne Cup	Arab Champions Cup	Total
1	FW	(Algeria) Yousri Bouzok	14	1	1	16
2	FW	(Morocco) Nawfel Zerhouni	7	3	0	10
3	FW	(Morocco) El Mehdi Maouhoub	8	1	0	9
4	AM	(Morocco) Adam Ennafati	7	1	0	8
5	FW	(Algeria) Riad Benayad	2	2	0	4
6	MF	(Morocco) Zakaria El Wardi	2	0	1	3
7	AM	(Morocco) Sabir Bougrine	2	0	0	2
8	DF	(Morocco) Youssef Belammari	1	1	0	2
9	MF	(Morocco) Mohamed Zrida	1	0	1	2
10	DF	(Morocco) Bouchaib Arrassi	1	0	1	2
11	DF	(Morocco) Abdellah Khafifi	2	0	0	2
12	DF	(Morocco) Mohamed Boulacsoute	1	1	0	2
13	MF	(Morocco) Mohamed Al Makahasi	1	0	0	1
14	DF	(Morocco) Ismael Mokadem	0	1	0	1
15	FW	(Morocco) Houssine Rahimi	0	0	1	1
16	DF	(Morocco) Abdessamad Badaoui	1	0	0	1
Own goals			2	2	1	5
Total			52	13	6	71

=== Assists ===
Rank	Pos.	Player	Botola	Throne Cup	Arab Champions Cup	Total
1	FW	(Algeria) Yousri Bouzok	8	2	0	10
2	AM	(Morocco) Adam Ennafati	4	1	0	5
3	AM	(Morocco) Sabir Bougrine	4	1	0	5
4	DF	(Morocco) Youssef Belammari	4	1	0	5
5	FW	(Morocco) Nawfel Zerhouni	3	1	1	5
6	FW	(Morocco) Mohamed Boulacsoute	2	1	1	4
7	MF	(Morocco) Mohamed Zrida	3	0	0	3
8	MF	(Morocco) Mohamed Al Makahasi	1	1	0	2
9	FW	(Morocco) El Mehdi Maouhoub	2	0	0	2
10	DF	(Morocco) Zakaria Labib	0	0	1	1
Total			31	8	3	42

=== Hat-tricks ===
Player	Against	Competition	Minutes	Score after goals	Result	Date
(Morocco) Nawfel Zerhouni	(Morocco) Ittihad Tanger	Botola	3', 62', 73'	1–0, 4–0, 6–0	6–1 (H)	28 December 2023
(Algeria) Yousri Bouzok	(Morocco) Ittihad Tanger	Botola	16', 28', 68'	2–0, 3–0, 5–0	6–1 (H)	28 December 2023

=== Clean sheets ===
No.	Player	Botola	Throne Cup	Arab Champions Cup	Total
1	(Morocco) Anas Zniti	17	2	1	20
89	(Morocco) Marouane Fakhr	0	0	1	1
Total		17	2	2	21
