= Football at the 2017 Jeux de la Francophonie =

2017 Football Tournament at the Jeux de la Francophonie.
Tournament details
- Host country: Ivory Coast
- City: Abidjan
- Dates: 21–30 July 2017
- Teams: 16 (from 16 associations)
- Venues: 2 (in 1 host city)

Final positions
- Champions: Morocco (2nd title)
- Runners-up: Ivory Coast
- Third place: Mali
- Fourth place: DR Congo

Tournament statistics
- Matches played: 28
- Goals scored: 62 (2.21 per match)

The football tournament at the 2017 Jeux de la Francophonie took place from 21 to 30 July in Abidjan, Ivory Coast. The organization of the football competition has been considered to be a fiasco by some participating countries. The tournament was supposed to follow the FIFA tiebreaker rules. However, the organizing committee decided to change the rules in the midst of the competition in favour of Ivory Coast, thus eliminating Guinea from the group stage. Due to these changes, D.R. Congo also qualified for the semifinals instead of Quebec. Also in the semifinals, Mali delegation protested the referee's call of a frivolous penalty that won the game for the hosts Ivory Coast.

== Participants ==
- Burkina Faso
- Congo
- Ivory Coast
- Cameroon
- DR Congo
- France
- Gabon (withdrew)
- Guinea
- Haiti
- Lebanon
- Morocco
- Mali
- Mauritius
- Niger
- Quebec
- Senegal

== Draw ==
The draw was carried out on 23 February 2017.

Prior to the draw, teams were divided in pools.

Pool 1	Ivory Coast; Morocco; Congo; France	Pool 2	Senegal; Quebec; Cameroon; Burkina Faso
Pool 3	Lebanon; Mali; Mauritius; DR Congo	Pool 4	Haiti; Guinea; Niger; Gabon

== Squads ==
Players must be born on or after 1 January 1997.

== Group stage ==
=== Tiebreakers ===
The ranking of each team in each group will be determined as follows:

1. Greatest number of points obtained in group matches
2. Greatest number of points obtained in direct confrontation
3. Goal difference in all group matches
4. Greatest number of goals scored in all group matches

=== Group A ===
Pos	Team	Pld	W	D	L	GF	GA	GD	Pts	Qualification
1	Ivory Coast (H)	3	2	0	1	5	3	+2	6	Advance to knockout stage
2	Guinea	3	2	0	1	6	5	+1	6	
3	Burkina Faso	3	1	1	1	3	3	0	4	
4	Lebanon	3	0	1	2	2	5	−3	1	

Rules for classification: Group stage tiebreakers
(H) Hosts
21 July 2017
09:00
Match 1

Guinea	3–2	Ivory Coast
Toure 26', 77'; Cisse 42'	Report	Loba 16'; Meleke 89'

Stade Robert Champroux, Abidjan
Referee: Samir Guezzaz (Morocco)
21 July 2017
09:00
Match 2

Burkina Faso	1–1	Lebanon
Cissé 33'	Report	El Shoum 89'

Parc des sports de Treichville, Abidjan
Referee: Issa Sy (Senegal)

23 July 2017
17:00
Match 9

Ivory Coast	1–0	Burkina Faso
Loba 74'	Report

Stade Robert Champroux, Abidjan
Referee: Kokou N'Tale (Togo)
23 July 2017
17:00
Match 10

Lebanon	1–2	Guinea
Mehanna 62'	Report	Bah 40'; A. Camara 87'

Parc des Sports de Treichville, Abidjan
Referee: Daouda Gomno (Niger)

25 July 2017
14:00
Match 17

Ivory Coast	2–0	Lebanon
W. Ta Bi 32'; Loba 69'	Report

Stade Robert Champroux, Abidjan
Referee: Yannick Kabanga Malala (DR Congo)
25 July 2017
14:00
Match 18

Burkina Faso	2–1	Guinea
Cissé 13', 85'	Report	F. Soumah 52'

Parc des Sports de Treichville, Abidjan
Referee: Gaoussou Kané (Mali)

=== Group B ===
Pos	Team	Pld	W	D	L	GF	GA	GD	Pts	Qualification
1	Mali	3	1	2	0	3	0	+3	5	Advance to knockout stage
2	Cameroon	3	1	2	0	2	0	+2	5	
3	Congo	3	1	1	1	4	3	+1	4	
4	Niger	3	0	1	2	1	7	−6	1	

Rules for classification: Group stage tiebreakers
21 July 2017
13:00
Match 3

Niger	1–4	Congo
Haïnikoye 38'	Report	Massala Maleke 30'; Nguessi Ondama 34'; Nkaya 43'; Ondongo 47'

Stade Robert Champroux, Abidjan
Referee: Kouassi Frédéric Biro (Ivory Coast)
21 July 2017
13:00
Match 4

Cameroon	0–0	Mali
	Report

Parc des Sports de Treichville, Abidjan
Referee: Jean Ouatarra (Burkina Faso)

23 July 2017
14:00
Match 11

Congo	0–2	Cameroon
	Report	Nguidjol 11'; Mountala 90+2'

Stade Robert Champroux, Abidjan
Referee: Roland Danon (Ivory Coast)
23 July 2017
14:00
Match 12

Mali	3–0	Niger
D. Traoré 44'; M. Traoré 47'; Kane 80'	Report

Parc des Sports de Treichville, Abidjan
Referee: Yannick Kabanga Malala (DR Congo)

25 July 2017
17:00
Match 19

Congo	0–0	Mali
	Report

Stade Robert Champroux, Abidjan
Referee: Kokou N'Tale (Togo)
25 July 2017
17:00
Match 20

Cameroon	0–0	Niger
	Report

Parc des Sports de Treichville, Abidjan
Referee: Samir Guezzaz (Morocco)

=== Group C ===
Pos	Team	Pld	W	D	L	GF	GA	GD	Pts	Qualification
1	Morocco	3	2	1	0	11	0	+11	7	Advance to knockout stage
2	Senegal	3	2	1	0	8	1	+7	7	
3	Mauritius	3	1	0	2	4	13	−9	3	
4	Gabon	3	0	0	3	0	9	−9	0	Withdrew

Rules for classification: Group stage tiebreakers
22 July 2017
14:00
Match 5

Gabon	0–3 (Forfeited)	Morocco

Stade Robert Champroux, Abidjan
22 July 2017
14:00
Match 6

Senegal	5–1	Mauritius
Niang 19', 65'; Ba 47'; Djitte 51'; Diop 73'	Report	Jolicoeur 54'

Parc des Sports de Treichville, Abidjan
Referee: Daouda Gomno (Niger)

24 July 2017
17:00
Match 13

Morocco	0–0	Senegal
	Report

Stade Robert Champroux, Abidjan
Referee: Juste Kokolo (Congo)
24 July 2017
17:00
Match 14

Mauritius	3–0 (Forfeited)	Gabon

Parc des Sports de Treichville, Abidjan

26 July 2017
14:00
Match 21

Morocco	8–0	Mauritius
Kiyine 5', 56'; Nassik 41', 60', 83'; Boutouil 66'; Hannouri 88', 90+1'	Report

Stade Robert Champroux, Abidjan
Referee: Roland Danon (Ivory Coast)
26 July 2017
14:00
Match 22

Senegal	3–0 (Forfeited)	Gabon

Stade Robert Champroux, Abidjan

=== Group D ===
Pos	Team	Pld	W	D	L	GF	GA	GD	Pts	Qualification
1	DR Congo	3	2	0	1	3	2	+1	6	Advance to knockout stage
2	Quebec	3	2	0	1	3	4	−1	6	
3	France	3	1	1	1	5	3	+2	4	
4	Haiti	3	0	1	2	2	4	−2	1	

Rules for classification: Group stage tiebreakers
22 July 2017
17:00
Match 7

Haiti	1–1	France
Guillaume 82'	Report	Mroivili 80'

Stade Robert Champroux, Abidjan
Referee: Hadi Salameh (Lebanon)
22 July 2017
17:00
Match 8

Quebec	1–0	DR Congo
Wiethaeuper-Balbinotti 36'	Report

Parc des Sports de Treichville, Abidjan
Referee: Gaoussou Kané (Mali)

24 July 2017
14:00
Match 15

France	3–0	Quebec
Karraoui 31', 63'; Mehadji 33'	Report

Stade Robert Champroux, Abidjan
Referee: Issa Sy (Senegal)
24 July 2017
14:00
Match 16

DR Congo	1–0	Haiti
Nzembele 83'	Report

Parc des Sports de Treichville, Abidjan
Referee: Ousmane Camara (Guinea)

26 July 2017
17:00
Match 23

France	1–2	DR Congo
Nkada 85'	Report	Zola 54'; Lusuki 87'

Stade Robert Champroux, Abidjan
Referee: Kouassi Frédéric Biro (Ivory Coast)
26 July 2017
17:00
Match 24

Quebec	2–1	Haiti
Bobe 58', 90+1'	Report	Jeudy 53'

Parc des Sports de Treichville, Abidjan
Referee: Juste Kokolo (Congo)

== Knockout stage ==
=== Semi-finals ===
28 July 2017
Match 25

Ivory Coast	2–1	Mali
Diaby 18'; Loba 79' (pen.)	Report	Camara 45+6'

Stade Félix Houphouet-Boigny, Abidjan
Referee: Daouda Gomno (Niger)

28 July 2017
Match 26

Morocco	1–0	DR Congo
Hannouri 84'	Report

Stade Félix Houphouet-Boigny, Abidjan
Referee: Kokou N'Tale (Togo)

=== Third-place playoff ===
30 July 2017
Match 27

Mali	2–1	DR Congo
Touré 9'; N'Diaye 90+1'	Report	Balongo 37'

Stade Félix Houphouet-Boigny, Abidjan
Referee: Hadi Salameh (Lebanon)

=== Final ===
30 July 2017
Match 28

Ivory Coast	1–1 (a.e.t.)	Morocco
Kassi 64'	Report	Kiyine 8'
Penalties
Loba (penalty scored); Sanogo (penalty scored); Niangbo (penalty scored); Meleke (penalty scored); Ta Bi (penalty scored); Diaby (penalty scored); Kassi (penalty missed)	6–7	El Mourabit (penalty scored); El Wardi (penalty scored); Gaddarine (penalty scored); Bari (penalty scored); Kiyine (penalty scored); Bach (penalty scored); Boutouil (penalty scored)

Stade Félix Houphouet-Boigny, Abidjan
Referee: Issa Sy (Senegal)

== Medalists ==
Event	Gold	Silver	Bronze
Men's under-20	Morocco; El Mehdi Benabid; Hamza El Kaouakibi; Achraf Dari; Abdelmounaim Boutouil; Badr Gaddarine; Anas Bach; Youssef Belammari; Fahd Difi; Bilal Bari; Mohamed El Mourabit; Zakaria Nassik; El Mehdi Agdai; Achraf Laadoul; Zakaria El Wardi; Zakaria Azoud; Hamza Hannouri; Sofian Kiyine; Hamza Dezza; Othman Fadiz	Ivory Coast; Moussa Baba Bamba; Junior Yeo; Koffi Habib Ande; Aboubacar Kouyaté; Willy Braciano Ta Bi; Ulrich Meleke; Ali Sanogo; Trazié Thomas Zai; Aké Arnaud Loba; Anderson Niangbo; Thierry Kassi; Koffi Dakoi; Hamed Junior Traorè; El Hadje Moustapha Danté; Razack Cissé; Kouya Mabea; Souleymane Diaby; Moustapha Camara	Mali; Alkalifa Coulibaly; Mamadou Sacko; Djémoussa Traoré; Fode Konaté; Mamadi Fofana; Mohamed Camara; Hadji Dramé; Abdoulaye Dabo; El Bilal Touré; Abdou Salam Ag Jiddou; Mamadou Traoré; Cheick Doucouré; Siaka Sidibé; Abdoulaye Diaby; Youssouf Koita; Mamadou Samake; Ibrahim Kane; Lassana N'Diaye; Dramane Traoré
