= Mohamed Boulacsoute =

Moroccan professional footballer

Personal information
- Date of birth: 23 September 1998 (age 28)
- Place of birth: Marrakesh, Morocco
- Height: 1.79 m (5 ft 10 in)
- Positions: Right-back; winger

Team information
- Current team: Raja CA
- Number: 7

Youth career
- 2014–2017: Youssoufia Berrechid
- 2017: Kawkab Marrakech

Senior career*
Years	Team	Apps	(Gls)
2017–2019	Kawkab Marrakech	32	(3)
2019–2022	SCC Mohammédia	43	(3)
2022–	Raja CA	123	(9)

International career^{‡}
2018–2021	Morocco U-23	2	(0)
2025–	Morocco A'	13	(0)
Medal record
Men's football
Representing Morocco
African Nations Championship
Winner	2024 Kenya-Tanzania-Uganda
FIFA Arab Cup
Winner	2025 Qatar	Team
- * Club domestic league appearances and goals as of 13 September 2026 ‡ National team caps and goals as of 21 December 2025

Mohamed Boulacsoute (Arabic: محمد بولكسوت; born 23 September 1998) is a Moroccan professional footballer who plays as a right-back or winger for Botola club Raja CA and the Morocco national team.

He began his footballing career at the Youssoufia Berrechid training center before joining Kawkab Marrakech in 2017 where he played directly with the first team and established himself as a regular player the following year. In 2019, he signed with Chabab Mohammédia and secured promotion to Botola Pro1. In 2022, he signed with Raja Club Athletic with whom he won the historic invincible-double in the 2023–24 season, an unprecedented achievement in the history of Moroccan football.

== Early life ==
Mohamed Boulacsoute was born on 23 September 1998 in Marrakesh. He began his footballing career with the youngsters of Youssoufia Berrechid.

== Career ==
In 2017, he began his professional career with Kawkab Marrakech, the biggest football club of his hometown.

He made his Botola debut during the 2017-18 season. He played seven league games.

During the 2018–19 season, he established himself as a starting player and played 26 league games and scored two goals. The team was relegated to Botola 2.

On 20 August 2019, Boulacsoute joined Chabab Mohammédia and helped the team to earn promotion to Botola at the end of the 2019–20 season.

On 15 July 2022, he signed a three-year contract with Raja Club Athletic after the end of his contract. On 6 January 2023, he received his first start against the Ittihad Tanger (3–0 victory).

On 14 June 2024, after a 0–3 win against MC Oujda in the last round, Raja were crowned champions ending the season without a single defeat – the first team ever to do so in the history of the league and breaking the record of points. On 1 July, Raja beat AS FAR once again in the Throne Cup final to secure the third domestic double of its history, and Boulacsoute scored the winning goal in the 79 minute.

== International career ==
On 29 December 2018, Mohamed Boulacsoute was called up with the Moroccan U-23 team for two friendly games confrontation against Gambia U23, on 6 and 9 January 2019 in Banjul.

In February 2019, he participated in a preparation camp with from 3 to 6 February 2019 in Rabat.

On 23 July 2025, he was announced among the list of players called up by Tarik Sektioui to take part in the 2024 African Nations Championship.

On 3 August 2025, the Atlas Lions began the group stage with a victory against Angola (2–0). However, they were surprisingly beaten by the host country, Kenya, by a score of 1–0. In a difficult situation, they bounced back against Zambia (goals from Hrimat, Lamlioui and Bougrine) and the DR Congo (goals from Hrimat and a brace from Lamliou). Starting from the match against Zambia, Boulacsoute would not miss a single minute of the competition. In the quarter-finals, the team eliminated the surprise of the tournament, Tanzania, by the narrowest of margins (1–0), in Dar es Salaam. In the semi-finals, the Moroccans faced the defending champions, Senegal. After a hard-fought match that ended 1–1 with a superb goal from Sabir Bougrine, Morocco won on penalties (5–3), thus reaching the final. On 30 August, at the Nyayo National Stadium, the Atlas Lions won the title by beating Madagascar 3–2, thanks to a brace from Oussama Lamlioui.

== Honours ==
Raja CA

- Botola Pro: 2023–24
- Moroccan Throne Cup: 2022–23

Morocco A'

- African Nations Championship: 2024
- FIFA Arab Cup: 2025
