= El Mehdi Al Harrar =

Moroccan footballer (born 2000)

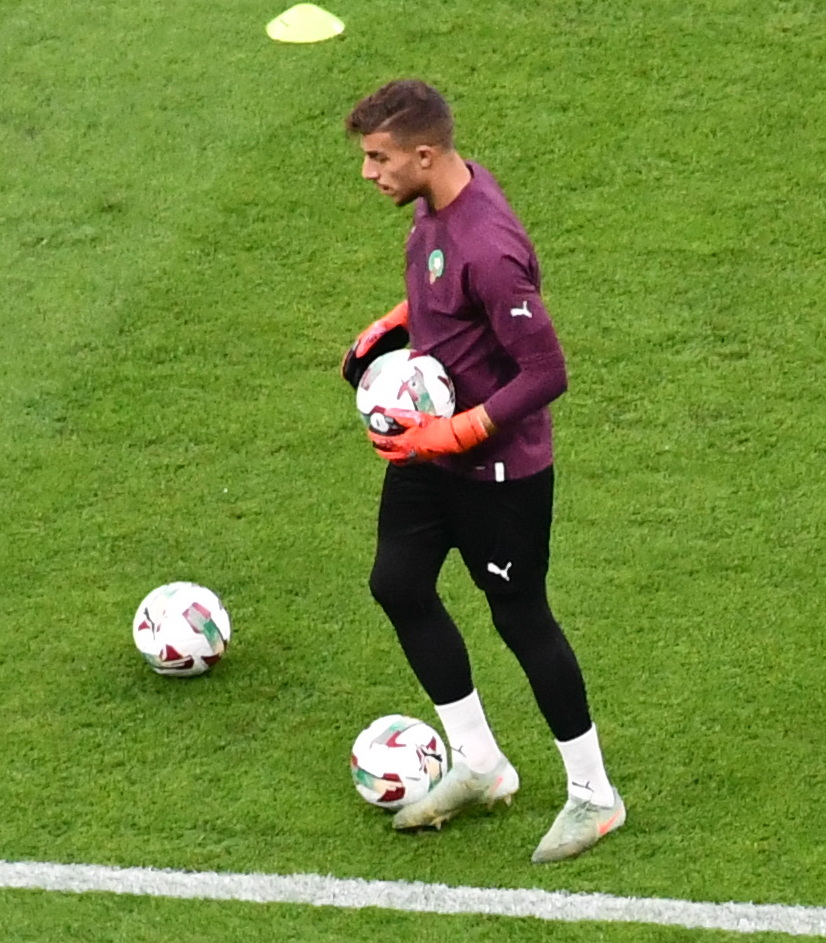

Personal information
- Full name: El Mehdi Al Harrar
- Date of birth: 30 November 2000 (age 25)
- Place of birth: Casablanca, Morocco
- Height: 1.92 m (6 ft 4 in)
- Position: Goalkeeper

Team information
- Current team: Raja CA
- Number: 12

Youth career
- –2019: SCC Mohammédia

Senior career*
Years	Team	Apps	(Gls)
2019–2024	SCC Mohammédia	34	(0)
2024–	Raja CA	44	(0)

International career^{‡}
2024–	Morocco A'	10	(0)
2025–	Morocco	7	(0)
Medal record
Men's football
Representing Morocco
Africa Cup of Nations
Winner	2025 Morocco
African Nations Championship
Winner	2024 Kenya-Tanzania-Uganda
- * Club domestic league appearances and goals as of 13 September 2026 ‡ National team caps and goals as of 26 August 2025

El Mehdi Al Harrar (Arabic: المهدي الحرار; born 30 November 2000) is a Moroccan professional footballer who plays as a goalkeeper with Botola side Raja CA and the Morocco national team.

He started playing football with Chabab Mohammédia academy before reaching the first team in 2019. He played there for five years and won the Botola Pro2 in 2019–20. In 2024, he joined Raja CA and established himself after the departure of club captain Anas Zniti.

== Club career ==
=== Chabab Mohammédia ===
El Mehdi Al Harrar is a product of Chabab Mohammedia's youth system.

In 2019, he joined the first team at the age of 19 under the direction of Marco Simone. The Italian manager was dismissed after nine games, he was replaced by Bernard Rodriguez then by Mohamed Amine Benhachem, the club managed despite this instability to be crowned champion of Botola Pro2, synonymous with accession to the first division.

On 4 December 2020, he made his Botola debut against Moghreb de Tétouan at Moulay Abdallah Stadium (0–2 win). During his four years in Mohammédia, Al Harrar was in competition with Youssef El Motie for the starting position, then after the latter's departure, with Soufiane Barrouhou.

=== Raja CA ===
In April 2024, it was announced in the press that El Mehdi Al Harrar had reached an agreement with Raja Club Athletic to join them in the summer, while his contract with Chabab Mohammédia was coming to the end.

In July, Raja CA officially announced the recruitment of the goalkeeper who signed a three-year contract. He declared that he had finally fulfilled his dream of playing for the club of his childhood.

On October 9, he played his first match with the Greens against Moghreb de Tétouan in the third match of the Excellence Cup (0–1 win).

== International career ==
On 11 November 2024, he was called up by Tarik Sektioui with the national A' team which brings together local players under 24, for a preparation training camp at the Mohammed VI Football Complex in Salé, from November 11 to 20.

On 23 July 2025, he was announced as one of Sektioui's players called up for the 2024 African Nations Championship.

On 3 August 2025, the Atlas Lions began the group stage with a victory against Angola (2–0). However, they were surprisingly beaten by the host country, Kenya, by a score of 1–0. In a difficult situation, they bounced back against Zambia (goals from Hrimat, Lamlioui and Bougrine) and the DR Congo (goals from Hrimat and a brace from Lamliou). This success allowed the team to qualify for the quarter-finals where they eliminated the surprise of the tournament, Tanzania, by the narrowest of margins (1–0), in Dar es Salaam. In the semi-finals, the Moroccans faced the defending champions, Senegal. After a hard-fought match that ended 1–1 with a superb goal from Sabir Bougrine, Morocco won on penalties (5–3), thus reaching the final. On August 30, at the Nyayo National Stadium, the Atlas Lions won the title by beating Madagascar 3–2, thanks to a brace from Oussama Lamlioui. Having played every possible minute, Al Harrar is cited among the architects of this success.

On 28 August 2025, he received his first call-up from Walid Regragui to join the Atlas Lions, to face Niger and Zambia in the new Prince Moulay Abdellah stadium, and qualify to the 2026 World Cup. He was listed as the third goalkeeper behind Yassine Bounou and Munir El Kajoui. Along with Youssef Belammari, he was called-up while still in Nairobi to play the African Nations Championship.

On 11 December 2025, Al Harrar was called up to the Morocco squad for the 2025 Africa Cup of Nations.

== Honours ==
Chabab Mohammédia

- Botola Pro 2: 2019–20

Morocco A'

- African Nations Championship: 2024

Morocco

- Africa Cup of Nations: 2025
