= Youssef Belammari =

Moroccan footballer (born 1998)

- Belammari with Morocco in 2026

Personal information
- Date of birth: 20 September 1998 (age 28)
- Place of birth: Casablanca, Morocco
- Height: 1.80 m (5 ft 11 in)
- Positions: Left-back; left midfielder

Team information
- Current team: Al Ahly
- Number: 20

Youth career
- –2017: FUS Rabat

Senior career*
| Years | Team | Apps | (Gls) |
| 2017–2023 | FUS Rabat | 121 | (8) |
| 2023–2026 | Raja CA | 65 | (4) |
| 2026– | Al Ahly | 0 | (0) |

International career^{‡}
| 2018 | Morocco U20 | 3 | (0) |
| 2018–2019 | Morocco U23 | 2 | (1) |
| 2024– | Morocco | 18 | (0) |
Medal record
Men's football
Representing Morocco
Africa Cup of Nations
| Winner | 2025 Morocco |
African Nations Championship
| Winner | 2024 Kenya-Tanzania-Uganda |
Jeux de la Francophonie
| Winner | 2017 Ivory Coast |
- * Club domestic league appearances and goals as of 24 January 2026 ‡ National team caps and goals as of 7 June 2026

Youssef Belammari (Arabic: يُوسُف بَلْعُمَرِيّ; born 20 September 1998) is a Moroccan professional footballer who plays as a left-back for Egyptian Premier League club Al Ahly and the Morocco national team.

He began his football career by joining the youth teams of Fath Union Sports when he was aged 10. In 2017, he was called up to the first team but he did not fully establish himself until the 2019–20 season. In 2023, he signed with Raja Club Athletic with whom he won the historic invincible-double in the 2023–24 season, an unprecedented achievement in the history of Moroccan football.

== Club career ==
=== Fath US ===
Born in Casablanca on 20 September 1998, Youssef Belammari arrived at Fath Union Sports's youth system at a young age. In early 2017, he joined the first team's squad under Walid Regragui.

On 5 April 2017, he made his professional debut against Raja CA in 2016–17 Botola (2–0 loss).

On 28 May, he made his first starting debut against Moghreb Tetouan (1–1 draw). On 27 August 2017, he scored his first professional goal against Mouloudia d'Oujda in the first round of the 2017 Throne Cup (1–1 draw).

=== Raja CA ===
On 2 July 2023, he signed a three-year deal with Raja CA and became the club's third summer signing of the season.

On 27 August 2023, he made his debut with the Greens against Youssoufia Berrechid on the opening match of the season (1–3 win). Slowed down a bit by an ankle injury the he got during a training session, it was against the same opponent on 8 February 2024, that he scored his first goal (2–0 win).

On 14 June 2024, after a 0–3 win against MC Oujda in the last round, Raja were crowned champions ending the season without a single defeat – the first team ever to do so in the history of the league and breaking the record of points. On July 1, Raja beat AS FAR once again in the Throne Cup final to secure the third domestic double of its history, and Belammari made a decisive tackle in the final minutes of the match.

Belammari strongly kicked-off the 2024–25 season with one goal and three assists in the first eight games. The team also qualifies to the Champions League's group stage.

== International career ==
In October 2017, he received his first call-up to the Morocco U20 squad by Mark Wotte. He played one friendly game against Italy U21 and two other against France U20. In October 2018, he played two friendly games against Algeria with the Moroccan U23 team.

In August 2022, Belammari was called up by Hussein Ammouta to the National A' team for a training camp between 1st and 6 August. The Atlas Lions played a friendly tournament in Austria against Qatar and Jamaica.

On 7 October 2024, he received his first call-up with the first team from Walid Regragui, as a reinforcement to replace Noussair Mazraoui, who was out due to injury. The goal of this gathering is a double confrontation against Central African Republic, counting for the 2025 Africa Cup of Nations qualifications.

On 23 July 2025, he was announced among the list of players called up by Tarik Sektioui to take part in the 2024 African Nations Championship. On 28 August 2025, he was included in the squad-list selected to face Niger and Zambia in the new Prince Moulay Abdellah stadium, and qualify to the 2026 World Cup. Along with El Mehdi Al Harrar, he was selected while still in Nairobi to play in the final of the African Nations Championship.

On 3 August 2025, the Atlas Lions began the group stage with a victory against Angola (2–0). However, they were surprisingly beaten by the host country, Kenya, by a score of 1–0. In a difficult situation, they bounced back against Zambia (goals from Hrimat, Lamlioui and Bougrine) and the DR Congo (goals from Hrimat and a brace from Lamliou). This success allowed the team to qualify for the quarter-finals where they eliminated the surprise of the tournament, Tanzania, by the narrowest of margins (1–0), in Dar es Salaam. In the semi-finals, the Moroccans faced the defending champions, Senegal. After a hard-fought match that ended 1–1 with a superb goal from Sabir Bougrine, Morocco won on penalties (5–3), thus reaching the final. On August 30, at the Nyayo National Stadium, the Atlas Lions won the title by beating Madagascar 3–2, thanks to a brace from Oussama Lamlioui.

On 11 December 2025, Belammari was called up to the Morocco squad for the 2025 Africa Cup of Nations.

On 26 May 2026, Belammari was selected in the 26-man squad for the 2026 FIFA World Cup.

== Honours ==
Raja CA

- Botola Pro: 2023–24
- Moroccan Throne Cup: 2022–23

Morocco U20

- Jeux de la Francophonie: 2017

Morocco A'

- African Nations Championship: 2024

Morocco

- Africa Cup of Nations: 2025
