= Ulrich Meleke =

Ivorian footballer

Personal information
- Date of birth: 24 May 1999 (age 27)
- Place of birth: Abidjan, Ivory Coast
- Height: 1.79 m (5 ft 10 in)
- Positions: Centre-back; defensive midfielder

Team information
- Current team: Gaziantep
- Number: 6

Youth career
- –2018: SO Armée

Senior career*
Years	Team	Apps	(Gls)
2018–2019	Ekenäs IF	15	(1)
2018	→ Hapoel Tel Aviv (loan)	0	(0)
2018–2019	→ Hapoel Bnei Lod (loan)	32	(1)
2020	KPV	18	(0)
2021	Botoșani	12	(0)
2021–2022	CFR Cluj	0	(0)
2021–2022	→ Voluntari (loan)	29	(0)
2022–2023	Voluntari	32	(0)
2023–2026	Al Bataeh	69	(3)
2026–	Gaziantep	7	(0)

International career
2016	Ivory Coast U17	3	(0)
2017–2018	Ivory Coast U20	10	(0)
- * Club domestic league appearances and goals as of 11 October 2026

Ulrich Meleke (born 24 May 1999) is an Ivorian professional footballer who plays as a central defender for Turkish Süper Lig club Gaziantep.

== Career statistics ==
=== Club ===
As of 27 May 2024

Club	Season	League			Cup		Continental		Other		Total	
Club	Season	Division	Apps	Goals	Apps	Goals	Apps	Goals	Apps	Goals	Apps	Goals
Ekenäs IF	2018	Ykkönen	15	1	—		—		—		15	1
Hapoel Tel Aviv (loan)	2018–19	Israeli Premier League	0	0	—		—		0	0	0	0
Hapoel Bnei Lod (loan)	2018–19	Liga Leumit	32	1	1	0	—		—		33	1
KPV	2020	Ykkönen	18	0	4	0	—		—		22	0
Botoșani	2020–21	Liga I	12	0	—		—		—		12	0
CFR Cluj	2021–22	Liga I	0	0	—		0	0	—		0	0
Voluntari (loan)	2021–22	Liga I	29	0	4	0	—		—		33	0
Voluntari	2022–23	Liga I	33	0	3	0	—		—		36	0
Al Bataeh	2023–24	UAE Pro League	23	0	—		—		2 (Note: Appearance(s) in UAE League Cup)	0	25	0
Career Total			162	2	12	0	0	0	2	0	176	2

== Honours ==
Voluntari

- Cupa României runner-up: 2021–22

Ivory Coast U20

- Toulon Tournament runner-up: 2017
