= Hilal Ferdaoussi =

Moroccan footballer (born 1999)

Personal information
- Date of birth: 23 June 1999 (age 27)
- Place of birth: Tetouan, Morocco
- Height: 1.77 m (5 ft 10 in)
- Position: Midfielder

Team information
- Current team: Raja CA
- Number: 8

Youth career
- –2020: Moghreb Tétouan

Senior career*
Years	Team	Apps	(Gls)
2020–2024	Moghreb Tétouan	61	(3)
2025–	Raja CA	32	(0)

International career^{‡}
2020	Morocco U-23		
- * Club domestic league appearances and goals as of 5 February 2026 ‡ National team caps and goals as of 20 August 2025

Hilal Ferdaoussi (Arabic: هلال الفردوسي; born 23 June 1999) is a Moroccan professional footballer who plays as a midfielder for Botola side Raja CA.

== Early life ==
Hilal Ferdaoussi was born on 23 June 1999 in Tetouan. While still young, he joined the Moghreb Tétouan football academy under the direction of Abdelouahed Benhsain, future manager of the first team.

== Club career ==
On 15 December 2018, he made his professional debut under Abdelouahed Benhsain against Chbaba Rif Al Hoceima in the 12th round of Botola (4–1 victory). At the end of the 2020–21 season, the club was relegated to the second division for the first time since 2005. Ferdaoussi then established himself in midfield and helped his team immediately return to the Botola by comfortably winning the league.

The 2022–23 season was the breakthrough season, as Ferdaoussi secured a starting spot in Abdellatif Jrindou's team throughout the first half of the season. On 18 October 2022, he provided his first assist against RS Berkane (2–2 draw). In January 2023, he broke a metatarsal bone against Olympique Khouribga, which interrupted his momentum and kept him out of the pitch for five months.

On 23 September 2023, he scored the first goal of his professional career against Chabab Mohammédia at El Bachir Stadium.

On 12 July 2024, Raja CA announced the signing of Hilal Ferdaoussi, who signed a three-year contract.

On 29 September, he made his debut for the Greens against Olympique Safi in the league (a 3–2 victory). On 26 November, he made his Champions League debut against AS FAR.

== International career ==
In September 2020, he was called up by Bernard Simondi with the national under-23 team for a preparation camp at the Mohammed VI Football Complex from 13 to 23 September.

== Honours ==
Moghreb Tétouan

- Botola Pro2: 2021–22
