= Pape Ousmane Sakho =

Senegalese footballer (born 1996)

Personal information
- Date of birth: 21 December 1996 (age 29)
- Place of birth: Rufisque, Senegal
- Height: 1.73 m (5 ft 8 in)
- Position: Winger

Team information
- Current team: Raja CA
- Number: 21

Senior career*
Years	Team	Apps	(Gls)
2016–2017	Diambars		
2017–2019	Mbour Petite-Côte		
2019–2020	Noisy Le Grand FC	1	(0)
2020–2021	Teungueth		
2021–2023	Simba SC		
2023	Quevilly-Rouen B	6	(0)
2023–2024	Quevilly-Rouen	3	(0)
2024–	Raja CA	42	(3)

International career^{‡}
2023	Senegal	1	(0)
- * Club domestic league appearances and goals as of 13 September 2026 ‡ National team caps and goals as of 02:49, 15 September 2023 (UTC)

Pape Ousmane Sakho (born 21 December 1996) is a Senegalese professional footballer who plays as a winger for Botola club Raja CA.

== Club career ==
Sakho began his career at Diambars in his native Senegal. In 2021, he signed for Tanzanian club Simba, where he "established himself as one of the most exciting wingers based in Africa". In July 2022, Sakho won the CAF Goal of the Year award for an acrobatic goal in a CAF Confederation Cup game against ASEC Mimosas in February 2022.

On 24 July 2023, Sakho signed for Ligue 2 club Quevilly-Rouen on a three-year contract. Simba SC reportedly received a transfer fee of €750,000.

On 24 August 2024, Sakho signed a two-year contract with Raja CA.

== International career ==
On 17 June 2023, Sakho made his debut for Senegal in a 1–1 draw against Benin in the Africa Cup of Nations qualification.

== Honours ==
Teungueth

- Senegal Ligue 1: 2020–21

Individual

- CAF Goal of the Year: 2022
