= Marouane Zila =

French professional footballer

Personal information
- Date of birth: 13 June 1997 (age 29)
- Place of birth: Casablanca, Morocco
- Height: 1.83 m (6 ft 0 in)
- Position: Right winger

Team information
- Current team: Raja CA
- Number: 20

Youth career
- –2019: Tihad AS

Senior career*
Years	Team	Apps	(Gls)
2019–2020	Tihad AS	6	(1)
2020–2023	SCC Mohammédia	37	(1)
2021–2022	→ Hassania Agadir (loan)	11	(0)
2023–	Raja CA	47	(2)
- * Club domestic league appearances and goals as of 11 April 2025 ‡ National team caps and goals as of 20 March 2024

Marouane Zila (Arabic: مروان زيلا; born 13 June 1997) is a Moroccan professional footballer who plays as a Right winger or attacking midfielder for Botola club Raja CA.

== Club career ==
Marouane Zila is a product of Tihad AS's youth system, before making his professional debut there and winning the Moroccan Cup in the 2019–20 season after a final against Hassania Agadir.

In October 2020, he joined SCC Mohammédia before being loaned for a season to Hassania Agadir.

On 7 September 2023, he signed a three-year contract with Raja CA under the leadership of coach Josef Zinnbauer. During that season, the team won the domestic double while remaining undefeated.

== International career ==
In December 2019, he received his first call-up to the A' national team, being called by Hussein Ammouta for the preparations for the 2020 African Nations Championship in Cameroon. He was ultimately not selected in the final list of participants in the competition.

== Honours ==
Raja CA

- Botola: 2023–24
- Throne Cup: 2024

Tihad AS

- Throne Cup: 2019
