= Abderahmane Soussi =

Moroccan footballer

Personal information
- Date of birth: 30 January 2003 (age 23)
- Place of birth: Anderlecht, Belgium
- Height: 1.80 m (5 ft 11 in)
- Position: Forward

Team information
- Current team: Mornar

Youth career
- –2020: RWDM47

Senior career*
Years	Team	Apps	(Gls)
2020–2021	RWDM47	0	(0)
2020–2021	→ Union SG (loan)	3	(0)
2021–2023	Antwerp	16	(0)
2023–2024	Akritas Chlorakas	12	(2)
2024–2025	Raja CA	21	(2)
2025–2026	Al-Dhafra	16	(1)
2026–	Mornar	0	(0)

International career^{‡}
2022–	Morocco U20	2	(0)
- * Club domestic league appearances and goals as of 11 April 2025 ‡ National team caps and goals as of 04:30, 3 May 2022 (UTC)

Abderahmane Soussi (born 30 January 2003) is a Moroccan professional football player who plays as a forward for Montenegrin First League side Mornar. Born in Belgium, he is a youth international for Morocco.

== Club career ==
On 3 June 2021, he signed a three-year professional contract with Antwerp.

He made his Belgian First Division A debut for Antwerp on 25 July 2021 in a game against Mechelen.

On 19 September 2024, Soussi signed a two-year contract with Raja CA.

On 24 September 2025, Soussi signed a two-year contract with Al-Dhafra.

== International career ==
Born in Belgium, Soussi is of Moroccan descent. He was called up to a pair of friendlies with the Morocco U20s against Spain U20s in April 2022.
