= Willy Ta Bi =

Ivorian footballer (1999–2021)

Personal information
- Full name: Willy Braciano Ta Bi
- Date of birth: 5 December 1999
- Place of birth: Divo, Ivory Coast
- Date of death: 23 February 2021 (aged 21)
- Height: 1.79 m (5 ft 10 in)
- Position: Defensive midfielder

Senior career*
Years	Team	Apps	(Gls)
2015–2017	Moossou		
2017–2019	ASEC Mimosas		
2019–2021	Atalanta	0	(0)

International career
- Ivory Coast U17
- Ivory Coast U20
2017	Ivory Coast	1	(0)
- * Club domestic league appearances and goals

Willy Braciano Ta Bi (5 December 1999 – 23 February 2021) was an Ivorian professional footballer who played as a defensive midfielder. He made one senior appearance for the Ivory Coast national team in 2017.

== Club career ==
Born in Divo, Ta Bi played club football for Moossou, ASEC Mimosas and Atalanta.

== International career ==
Ta Bi made one appearance for the Ivory Coast senior team in 2017, and also represented them at under-17 and under-20 levels. He captained the national youth team and appeared at the 2017 Francophone Games.

== Death ==
Ta Bi died on 23 February 2021, aged 21, from liver cancer.
