= Abdelkrim Baadi =

Moroccan footballer

Personal information
- Full name: Abdelkrim Baadi
- Date of birth: 14 April 1996 (age 30)
- Place of birth: Agadir, Morocco
- Height: 1.73 m (5 ft 8 in)
- Position: Leftback

Team information
- Current team: Raja CA

Senior career*
Years	Team	Apps	(Gls)
2017–2020	Hassania Agadir	53	(1)
2020–2024	RS Berkane	71	(0)
2024–	Raja CA	32	(1)

International career^{‡}
2019–	Morocco	1	(0)
- * Club domestic league appearances and goals as of 5 February 2026 ‡ National team caps and goals as of 31 March 2019

Abdelkrim Baadi (Arabic: عبد الكريم باعدي; born 14 April 1996) is a Moroccan professional footballer who plays as a leftback for Raja CA and the Morocco national football team.

== Club career ==
Baadi started his career playing for HUSA. In October 2020, he joined RS Berkane.

== International career ==
Baadi made his professional debut for the Morocco national football team in a 0–0 tie with Malawi on 22 March 2019, in a 2019 Africa Cup of Nations qualification match.
