= El Mehdi Maouhoub =

Moroccan footballer (born 2003)

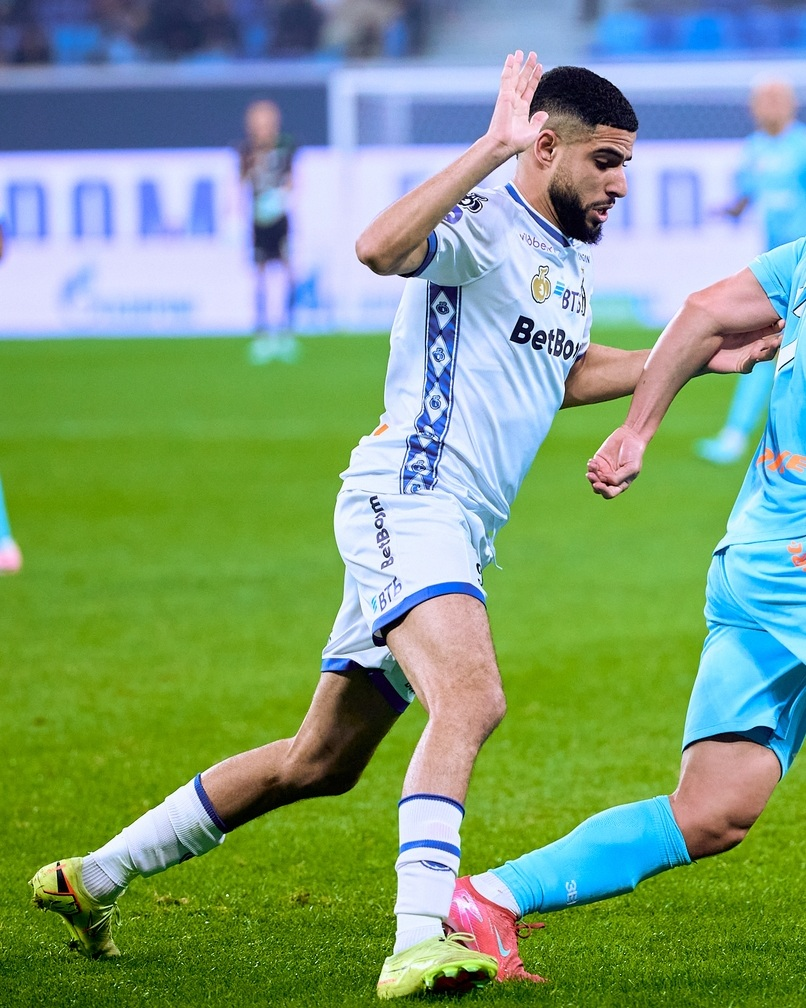
- Maouhoub with Dynamo Moscow in 2025

Personal information
- Date of birth: 5 June 2003 (age 23)
- Place of birth: Casablanca, Morocco
- Height: 1.86 m (6 ft 1 in)
- Position: Forward

Team information
- Current team: Dubai United (on loan from Dynamo Moscow)

Senior career*
Years	Team	Apps	(Gls)
2021–2023	Fath Union Sport	34	(3)
2023	→ JS Soualem (loan)	12	(7)
2023–2024	Raja CA	19	(8)
2024–	Dynamo Moscow	35	(5)
2026–	→ Dubai United (loan)	0	(0)

International career^{‡}
2019	Morocco U17	1	(0)
2021–2022	Morocco U20	8	(1)
2024	Morocco Olympic	7	(2)
Medal record
Men's football
Representing Morocco
Olympic Games
Bronze medal – third place	2024 Paris	Team
- * Club domestic league appearances and goals as of 22 March 2026 ‡ National team caps and goals as of 8 August 2024

El Mehdi Maouhoub (Arabic: المهدي موهوب; born 5 June 2003) is a Moroccan professional footballer who plays as a forward for Emirati club Dubai United on loan from the Russian club Dynamo Moscow.

He started his professional career with Fath Union Sport at the age of 17. In January 2023, he went on a six month-loan to JS Soualem where he scored 7 goals in 12 games. His then realized his childhood dream when he joined Raja CA in the summer of 2023 and won a historic undefeated domestic double. In 2024, he joined the Russian side Dynamo Moscow.

== Early life ==
Maouhoub was born in 2003 in Casablanca, Morocco. He started playing football at the age of six. After playing for Fath Union Sport academy for many years, El Mehdi Maouhoub made his senior debut at under the coaching of Mustapha El Khalfi at the age of 17 years and 10 months.

== Club career ==
=== Fath US ===
After playing for Fath Union Sport academy for many years, El Mehdi Maouhoub made his senior debut at under the coaching of Mustapha El Khalfi at the age of 17 years and 10 months.

On 4 April 2024, he made his first appearance in Botola against Maghreb AS replacing El Mehdi El Moubarik in the second half (1–1). The newly appointed manager Demba Mbaye gave him more minutes and ultimately started him on 12 May against Raja CA in Stade Mohammed-V where he played 90 minutes (1–1).

One week later, he finally scored his first professional goal against Ittihad Tanger (2–1 win).

=== Loan to JS Soualem ===
After a disappointing start of the 2022–23 season where he played once in 14 matches, he was loaned to Jeunesse Soualem for the remaining six months of the season. On 28 January 2023, he scored in his debut against Ittihad Tanger.

He finished the season with 7 goals in 12 matches.

=== Raja CA ===
He signed a three-year contract with Raja CA during the 2023 summer. He played his first match on 17 September 2023 against Maghreb AS and scored his first goal with the club on 6 January 2024 in Berrechid against MC Oujda. On 14 February 2024, he was expelled against the Maghreb AS, just before half-time, for having collected two yellows.

On 20 February 2024, for his 10th match with the "Greens", he contributed to the victory of his team by scoring a brace against Hassania Agadir.

=== Dynamo Moscow ===
On 23 August 2024, Maouhoub signed a five-year contract with Russian Premier League club Dynamo Moscow. The transfer fee was reported as €1,8 million.

He made his debut for Dynamo on 28 August 2024 in a Russian Cup 5–1 victory over Krylia Sovetov Samara.

On his league debut on 1 September 2024 against Orenburg he converted a penalty kick for his first Dynamo goal. In his third league game on 22 September 2024, an Oldest Russian derby game against Spartak Moscow, he was sent off 6 minutes after coming off the bench and getting booked twice, for arguing with a referee and diving. On 24 October 2024, he scored his first career hat-trick in a 6–3 Russian Cup victory over Krylia Sovetov. On 12 March 2025 in a Russian Cup game against CSKA Moscow, he was sent off for the second time in the 2024–25 season for recklessly attacking CSKA goalkeeper Vladislav Torop.

On 10 August 2026, Maouhoub was loaned to Dubai United in the United Arab Emirates for one season, with an option to buy.

== International career ==
El Mehdi Maouhoub competed in the UNAF qualifications for the 2021 U-20 Africa Cup of Nations with the Moroccan national U20 team. During this tournament, El Mehdi scored against Algeria but was sanctioned by the UNAF for an unsportsmanlike gesture after the goal. Morocco nevertheless qualified for the final phase.

He therefore competed in the final phase of the CAN in February 2021. Competition at the end of which, Morocco is eliminated at the quarter-final by Tunisia on penalty. Maouhoub plays all the matches of the tournament, organized in Mauritania.

On 4 July 2024, he was selected by Tarik Sektioui in the final 18 player-list of the Moroccan U23 team to take part in the 2024 Summer Olympics. He converted a penalty-kick against the United States U23 team in the quarter-finals clash.

== Career statistics ==
As of match played 22 March 2026

Appearances and goals by club, season and competition
Club	Season	League			Cup		Total	
Club	Season	Division	Apps	Goals	Apps	Goals	Apps	Goals
Fath Union Sport	2020–21	Botola	13	2	0	0	13	2
Fath Union Sport	2021–22	Botola	20	1	2	0	22	1
Fath Union Sport	2022–23	Botola	1	0	1	0	2	0
Fath Union Sport	Total		34	3	3	0	37	3
JS Soualem (loan)	2022–23	Botola	12	7	—		12	7
Raja CA	2023–24	Botola	19	8	5	1	24	9
Dynamo Moscow	2024–25	Russian Premier League	19	3	5	5	24	8
Dynamo Moscow	2025–26	Russian Premier League	16	2	5	1	21	3
Dynamo Moscow	Total		35	5	10	6	45	11
Career total			100	23	18	7	118	30

== Honours ==
Morocco U23

- Summer Olympics bronze medal: 2024
