= Zakaria Labib =

Moroccan footballer (born 2003)

Personal information
- Date of birth: 28 February 2003 (age 23)
- Place of birth: Casablanca, Morocco
- Height: 1.80 m (5 ft 11 in)
- Position: Left-back

Team information
- Current team: JS Soualem
- Number: 3

Youth career
- –2022: Raja CA

Senior career*
Years	Team	Apps	(Gls)
2022–2025	Raja CA	17	(0)
2023–2024	→ JS Soualem (loan)	11	(0)
2025–	JS Soualem	0	(0)

International career^{‡}
2020	Morocco U17	2	(0)
2022	Morocco U20	7	(1)
2023–	Morocco U23	9	(0)
2024–	Morocco A'	4	(0)
Medal record
Representing Morocco
U-23 Africa Cup of Nations
Winner	2023 Morocco
- * Club domestic league appearances and goals as of 26 August 2025 ‡ National team caps and goals as of 9 February 2024

Zakaria Labib (Arabic: زكريا لبيب; born 28 February 2003) is a Moroccan professional footballer who plays as a left-back for Botola club JS Soualem.

== Club career ==
Labib was born on 28 February 2003 in Casablanca. At an early age, he joined Raja Club Athletic's youth system in the Oasis complex.

On 15 July 2023, Raja reached the Throne Cup final against RS Berkane, who won this match in extra time at the Moulay Abdellah Stadium (1–0 loss).

== International career ==
Labib received his first call-up to the Morocco U17 team in 2020. In 2022, he was called up to the National U20 team and played some friendly games against Romania (2-2 draw), Sudan (4–2 win) and Palestine (1–0 win).

On 9 June 2023, he was one of only four Botola players to appear on Issame Charaï's final list that will play the 2023 U-23 Africa Cup of Nations in Morocco. Their group included Guinea, Ghana and Congo. Absent from the opening match against Guinea (victory, 2–1), he replaced Oussama El Azzouzi against Ghana and qualified for the semi-finals after a 5–1 victory. He didn't play against Mali and the Moroccans won on penalties after a 2–2 draw and qualified for the 2024 Olympic Games. Atlas Lions won the final against Egypt thanks to Oussama Targhalline's late winner (victory, 2–1). The team was congratulated by King Mohammed VI for their achievement.

== Honours ==
Raja CA

- Botola Pro: 2023–24
- Moroccan Throne Cup: 2022–23

Morocco U23

- U-23 Africa Cup of Nations: 2023
