= 2019–20 Botola 2 =

Botola 2
- Season: 2019–20
- Promoted: Chabab Mohammédia; Maghreb de Fès
- Relegated: Sidi Kacem; Chabab Rif Al Hoceima

The 2019–20 Botola 2 is the 58th season of Botola 2, the second division of the Moroccan football league.

== Teams ==
- AS Salé
- Chabab Atlas Khénifra
- Chabab Ben Guerir
- Chabab Mohammédia
- Chabab Rif Al Hoceima
- Ittihad Khemisset
- KAC Kénitra
- Kawkab Marrakech
- Maghreb de Fès
- Olympique Dcheira
- Racing de Casablanca
- Riadi Salmi
- Sidi Kacem
- Tihad Casablanca
- Widad Témara
- Wydad de Fès

== League table ==
Pos	Team	Pld	W	D	L	GF	GA	GD	Pts	Qualification or relegation
1	Chabab Mohammédia	30	14	9	7	38	26	+12	51	Promotion to the Botola
2	Maghreb de Fès	30	13	13	4	40	25	+15	50	Promotion to the Botola
3	Olympique Dcheira	30	13	9	8	44	33	+11	48	
4	Racing de Casablanca	30	10	16	4	27	18	+9	46	
5	Riadi Salmi	30	12	9	9	25	21	+4	45	
6	Widad Témara	30	9	14	7	31	31	0	41	
7	Wydad de Fès	30	9	13	8	29	27	+2	40	
8	Chabab Atlas Khénifra	30	10	9	11	27	33	−6	39	
9	KAC Kénitra	30	8	12	10	30	33	−3	36 (Note: Head-to-head points: KAC Kénitra 4, Ittihad Khemisset 1)	
10	Ittihad Khemisset	30	9	9	12	40	43	−3	36	
11	Tihad Casablanca	30	8	11	11	29	34	−5	35	Qualification to Confederation Cup by winning Throne Cup
12	Chabab Ben Guerir	30	7	12	11	26	32	−6	33 (Note: Head-to-head points: Chabab Ben Guerir 7, Kawkab Marrakech 5, AS Salé 4)	
13	Kawkab Marrakech	30	7	12	11	28	31	−3	33	
14	AS Salé	30	6	15	9	26	31	−5	33	
15	Sidi Kacem	30	6	14	10	29	35	−6	32	Relegation to the Amateur National Championship
16	Chabab Rif Al Hoceima	30	6	9	15	24	40	−16	27	Relegation to the Amateur National Championship

Source: Soccerway
Rules for classification: 1) Points; 2) Head-to-head points; 3) Head-to-head goal difference; 4) Goal difference; 5) Goals scored; 6) Fair-play points; 7) Play-off.

== See also ==
- 2019–20 Botola
