= Houssine Rahimi =

Moroccan footballer (born 2002)

Personal information
- Date of birth: 4 February 2002 (age 24)
- Place of birth: Casablanca, Morocco
- Height: 1.87 m (6 ft 2 in)
- Position: Forward

Team information
- Current team: Al Ain
- Number: 13

Youth career
- 2012–2021: Raja CA

Senior career*
| Years | Team | Apps | (Gls) |
| 2021–2025 | Raja CA | 51 | (11) |
| 2022 | → RC Oued Zem (loan) | 6 | (1) |
| 2023–2024 | → JS Soualem (loan) | 21 | (4) |
| 2025– | Al Ain | 16 | (4) |

International career^{‡}
| 2021– | Morocco U23 | 3 | (0) |
| 2022– | Morocco A' | 3 | (0) |
- * Club domestic league appearances and goals as of 16 March 2026 ‡ National team caps and goals as of 30 March 2025

Houssine Rahimi (Arabic: حُسَيْن رَحِيمِيّ, romanized: Ḥusayn Raḥīmī; born 4 February 2002) is a Moroccan professional footballer who plays as a forward for UAE Pro League side Al Ain. He is the brother of former Raja and current Morocco player Soufiane Rahimi.

== Early life ==
Houssine Rahimi was born on 4 February 2002 in the family house in the Raja-Oasis Sports Complex. He's the youngest son of Mohamed Rahimi also known as Youaari, famous for being the main kit man of Raja Club Athletic during over 40 years.

== Club career ==
Like his two older brothers, Rahimi joined the club's academy at a young age and started to play with the U23 team in 2019.

On 16 February 2021, he signed a five-year contract (until 2026) at the same time as his brother Soufiane before joining the first team trainings.

On 10 September 2021, he made his professional debut under Lassaad Chabbi against Youssoufia Berrechid and scored the winning goal (1–0).

On 17 October, Houssine Rahimi scored the opener against LPRC Oiliers during the second round of the Champions League (2-0). He became the youngest goalscorer of the club's history in the Champions League aging 19 years and 8 months.

On 11 January 2022, he joined Rapide Oued Zem on loan until the end of the season. On 15 February 2022, he played made his debut against Wydad AC (defeat, 2–0). At the end of the season, he returns to his club and ends the year as vice-champion of Morocco.

On 28 July 2023, Rahimi played his first match in the Arab Cup of Champions Clubs against CR Belouizdad. Three days later, he scored the opener against Kuweit SC in a 2–0 victory that qualified Raja CA for the quarter-finals.

In June 2025, Rahimi signed a four-year contract with UAE Pro League side Al Ain, where he joined his brother, Soufiane Rahimi.

== International career ==
On 26 July 2021, Rahimi received his first call up to the Morocco U21 squad for a preparation camp. In October 2021, he appeared in Hicham Dmiai list for a camp at the Maâmora Sports Center in Salé from 4 to 12 October.

On 21 December 2022, he received his first call-up from Houcine Ammouta to the Morocco A' team for a friendly against Senegal A', as part of the preparations for 2022 African Nations Championship scheduled in Algeria. Unfortunately, the defending champions were unable to defend their title due to political tensions with Algerian authorities who refused to allow the squad to take a direct flight from Rabat to Constantine via their flag carrier sponsor, Royal Air Maroc.
