= List of Moroccan Throne Cup finals =

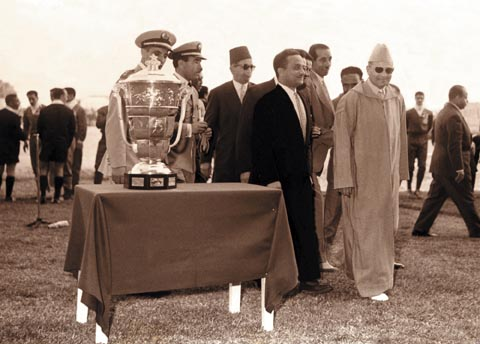
- The King of Morocco, Mohammed V, and Wydad AC president, El-Hajj Mohamed Benjelloun Touimi, in the 1959 Throne Cup final
- Organiser(s): Royal Moroccan Football Federation
- Founded: 1956; 70 years ago
- Region: Morocco
- Qualifier for: CAF Confederation Cup
- Current champions: Olympic Club Safi (1st title)
- Most championships: AS FAR (12 titles)

The Moroccan Throne Cup or officially the Throne Cup (Arabic: كأس العرش) is a knockout football tournament in Moroccan football, organized by the Royal Moroccan Football Federation, the governing body of the sport in Morocco. The reigning champions are Olympic Club Safi, who won their first-ever title in the 2023–24 season.

As of 2025, 19 clubs have won the Throne Cup. The record for the most wins is held by AS FAR, with 12 titles. The cup has been won in consecutive times at least once by five teams: MC Oujda, KAC Marrakech, Wydad AC, AS FAR and RS Berkane.

== Results ==
=== Under the Rule of the Ligue de la Libre (1945–1955) ===
Date	Winners	Result	Runners-up	Venues
18 November 1946	Majd Casablanca	--	Chabab Rabat	Stade Municipal, Rabat
18 November 1947	Majd Casablanca	--	Takaddoum Fès	Stade du Mechouar Saïd
20 November 1948	Moghreb de Casablanca	2–2 / --*	Nahda de Rabat	Stade du Parc des Sports
21 November 1949	Mohammedia de Rabat	--	Moghreb de Casablanca	Stade Olympique
26 November 1950	Rachad de Casablanca	1–0	Union de Casablanca	Stade de l'Union
19 November 1951	Nasr de Rabat	--	Wifaq de Casablanca	Stade Municipal
16 November 1952	Youssoufia de Rabat	3–2	Etoile de Fès	Stade Municipal, Rabat
1953–1954	Finale non jouée (renommée Coupe de la Libération)			
1954–1955	Finale non jouée			
1955	Ben M'sik Casablanca	1–1	AS Salé	

=== Under the Rule of the Royal Moroccan Football Federation (1956–present, Post-Independence) ===
Key
	Match decided via who scored first
	Match went to extra time
	Match decided via a penalty shoot-out after extra time
	Winning team won the Double (League title and Throne Cup)
	Team from outside the top tier of the Moroccan football league system
(#)	Number of trophy won by club

No.	Season	Winner	Score	Runner-up	Venue	Ref
1	1956–57	MC Oujda (1)	1–1 (Note: Both teams tied in the number of times Corner kicks were played. MC Oujda won the title due to scoring first.)	Wydad AC	Mohammed V Stadium, Casablanca	
2	1957–58	MC Oujda (2)	2–1	Wydad AC	Mohammed V Stadium, Casablanca	
3	1958–59	AS FAR (1)	1–0	MC Oujda	Mohammed V Stadium, Casablanca	
4	1959–60	MC Oujda (3)	1–0	Fath Union Sport	Mohammed V Stadium, Casablanca	
5	1960–61	Kénitra AC (1)	1–0	Wydad AC	Mohammed V Stadium, Casablanca	
6	1961–62	MC Oujda (4)	1–0	KAC Marrakech	Mohammed V Stadium, Casablanca	
7	1962–63	KAC Marrakech (1)	3–2 (a.e.t.)	Hassania Agadir	Mohammed V Stadium, Casablanca	
8	1963–64	KAC Marrakech (2)	3–2	Wydad AC	Mohammed V Stadium, Casablanca	
9	1964–65	KAC Marrakech (3)	3–1	Raja CA	Mohammed V Stadium, Casablanca	
10	1965–66	COD Meknès (1)	2–0	MAS Fès	Mohammed V Stadium, Casablanca	
11	1966–67	Fath Union Sport (1)	2–0	RS Settat	Mohammed V Stadium, Casablanca	
12	1967–68	Racing Casablanca (1)	1–0 (a.e.t.)	Raja CA	Mohammed V Stadium, Casablanca	
13	1968–69	Renaissance Settat (1)	2–1 (a.e.t.)	Kénitra AC	Mohammed V Stadium, Casablanca	
14	1969–70	Wydad AC (1)	1–0	RS Settat	Mohammed V Stadium, Casablanca	
15	1970–71	AS FAR (2)	1–1 (a.e.t.) (8–7 p)	Maghreb Fez	Mohammed V Stadium, Casablanca	
16	1971–72	The final between SCC Mohammédia and AS Douanes was not played, due to 1972 Moroccan coup attempt.				
17	1972–73	Fath Union Sport (2)	3–2	IZ Khemisset	Al Inbiâate Stadium, Agadir	
18	1973–74	Raja CA (1)	1–0	Maghreb Fez	Mohammed V Stadium, Casablanca	
19	1974–75	SCC Mohammédia (2)	2–0	US Sidi Kacem	Mohammed V Stadium, Casablanca	
20	1975–76	Fath Union Sport (3)	1–0	Kénitra AC	Marchan Stadium, Tangier	
21	1976–77	Raja CA (2)	1–0 (a.e.t.)	Difaâ Hassani El Jadidi	FUS Stadium, Rabat	
22	1977–78	Wydad AC (2)	3–0	Renaissance Kénitra	Saniat Rmel Stadium, Tétouan	
23	1978–79	Wydad AC (3)	2–1	SCC Mohammédia	Mohammed V Stadium, Casablanca	
24	1979–80	Maghreb Fez (1)	1–0	US Sidi Kacem	Stade Roches Noires, Casablanca	
25	1980–81	Wydad AC (4)	2–1	COD Meknès	Prince Moulay Abdellah Stadium, Rabat	
26	1981–82	Raja CA (3)	1–0	Renaissance Kénitra	Mohammed V Stadium, Casablanca	
27	1982–83	CLAS (1)	1–1 (a.e.t.) (5–4 p)	Raja CA	Mohammed V Stadium, Casablanca	
28	1983–84	AS FAR (3)	1–0	Renaissance Kénitra	Mohammed V Stadium, Casablanca	
29	1984–85	AS FAR (4)	3–0	Difaâ Hassani El Jadidi	Prince Moulay Abdellah Stadium, Rabat	
30	1985–86	AS FAR (5)	3–1	Difaâ Hassani El Jadidi	Prince Moulay Abdellah Stadium, Rabat	
31	1986–87	KAC Marrakech (4)	4–0	RS Berkane	Mohammed V Stadium, Casablanca	
32	1987–88	Maghreb Fez (2)	0–0 (a.e.t.) (4–2 p)	AS FAR	Prince Moulay Abdellah Stadium, Rabat	
33	1988–89	Wydad AC (5)	2–0	Olympique Khouribga	Prince Moulay Abdellah Stadium, Rabat	
34	1989–90	Olympique Casablanca (2)	0–0 (a.e.t.) (4–2 p)	AS FAR	Prince Moulay Abdellah Stadium, Rabat	
35	1990–91	KAC Marrakech (5)	2–1	Kénitra AC	Prince Moulay Abdellah Stadium, Rabat	
36	1991–92	Olympique Casablanca (3)	1–0	Raja CA	El Harti Stadium, Marrakesh	
37	1992–93	KAC Marrakech (6)	1–0	Maghreb Fez	Prince Moulay Abdellah Stadium, Rabat	
38	1993–94	Wydad AC (6)	1–0	Olympique Khouribga	Mohammed V Stadium, Casablanca	
39	1994–95	Fath Union Sport (4)	2–0	Olympique Khouribga	Prince Moulay Abdellah Stadium, Rabat	
40	1995–96	Raja CA (4)	1–0 (a.e.t.)	AS FAR	Hassan II Stadium, Fez	
41	1996–97	Wydad AC (7)	1–0 (a.e.t.)	KAC Marrakech	Prince Moulay Abdellah Stadium, Rabat	
42	1997–98	Wydad AC (8)	2–1	AS FAR	Prince Moulay Abdellah Stadium, Rabat	
43	1998–99	AS FAR (6)	1–0 (a.e.t.)	SCC Mohammédia	Prince Moulay Abdellah Stadium, Rabat	
44	1999–2000	Majd Al-Madina (1)	1–1 (a.e.t.) (8–7 p)	RS Settat	Prince Moulay Abdellah Stadium, Rabat	
45	2000–01	Wydad AC (9)	1–0 (g.g.)	Maghreb Fez	Prince Moulay Abdellah Stadium, Rabat	
46	2001–02	Raja CA (5)	2–0	Maghreb Fez	Prince Moulay Abdellah Stadium, Rabat	
47	2002–03	AS FAR (7)	1–0	Wydad AC	Prince Moulay Abdellah Stadium, Rabat	
48	2003–04	AS FAR (8)	0–0 (a.e.t.) (3–0 p)	Wydad AC	Prince Moulay Abdellah Stadium, Rabat	
49	2004–05	Raja CA (6)	0–0 (a.e.t.) (5–4 p)	Olympique Khouribga	Prince Moulay Abdellah Stadium, Rabat	
50	2005–06	Olympique Khouribga (1)	1–0	Hassania Agadir	Prince Moulay Abdellah Stadium, Rabat	
51	2006–07	AS FAR (9)	1–1 (a.e.t.) (5–3 p)	CR Bernoussi	Fez Stadium, Fez	
52	2007–08	AS FAR (10)	1–0 (a.e.t.)	Maghreb Fez	Prince Moulay Abdellah Stadium, Rabat	
53	2008–09	AS FAR (11)	1–1 (a.e.t.) (5–4 p)	Fath Union Sport	Prince Moulay Abdellah Stadium, Rabat	
54	2009–10	Fath Union Sport (5)	2–1	Maghreb Fez	Prince Moulay Abdellah Stadium, Rabat	
55	2010–11	Maghreb Fez (3)	1–0	COD Meknès	Prince Moulay Abdellah Stadium, Rabat	
56	2011–12	Raja CA (7)	0–0 (a.e.t.) (5–4 p)	AS FAR	Prince Moulay Abdellah Stadium, Rabat	
57	2012–13	Difaâ Hassani El Jadidi (1)	0–0 (a.e.t.) (5–4 p)	Raja CA	Prince Moulay Abdellah Stadium, Rabat	
58	2013–14	Fath Union Sport (6)	2–0	RS Berkane	Prince Moulay Abdellah Stadium, Rabat	
59	2014–15	Olympique Khouribga (2)	0–0 (a.e.t.) (4–1 p)	Fath Union Sport	Ibn Batouta Stadium, Tangier	
60	2016	Maghreb Fez (4)	2–1 (a.e.t.)	Olympic Safi	Sheikh Mohamed Laghdaf Stadium, Laayoune	
61	2017	Raja CA (8)	1–1 (a.e.t.) (3–1 p)	Difaâ Hassani El Jadidi	Prince Moulay Abdellah Stadium, Rabat	
62	2018	RS Berkane (1)	2–2 (a.e.t.) (3–2 p)	Wydad Fès	Prince Moulay Abdellah Stadium, Rabat	
63	2019	Tihad AS (1)	2–1	Hassania Agadir	Honor Stadium, Oujda	
64	2019–20	AS FAR (12)	3–0	MA Tétouan	Adrar Stadium, Agadir	
65	2020–21	RS Berkane (2)	0–0 (a.e.t.) (3–2 p)	Wydad AC	Prince Moulay Abdellah Stadium, Rabat	
66	2021–22	RS Berkane (3)	1–0 (a.e.t.)	Raja CA	Prince Moulay Abdellah Stadium, Rabat	
67	2022–23	Raja CA (9)	2–1	AS FAR	Adrar Stadium, Agadir	
68	2023–24	Olympic Safi (1)	1–1 (a.e.t.) (6–5 p)	RS Berkane	Fez Stadium, Fez	

== Results by team ==
Throne Cups by club (%)
1. AS FAR – 12 (17.6%)
2. Wydad AC – 9 (13.2%)
3. Raja CA – 9 (13.2%)
4. Fath Union Sport – 6 (8.82%)
5. KAC Marrakech – 6 (8.82%)
6. Maghreb of Fez – 4 (5.88%)
7. MC Oujda – 4 (5.88%)
8. Other clubs – 18 (26.5%)

Club	Wins	Runners-up	Total finals	Winning%	Winning years	Loss%	Runner-up years
AS FAR	12	6	18	66.67%	1959, 1971, 1984, 1985, 1986, 1999, 2003, 2004, 2007, 2008, 2009, 2020	33.33%	1988, 1990, 1996, 1998, 2012, 2023
Wydad AC	9	7	16	56.25%	1970, 1978, 1979, 1981, 1989, 1994, 1997, 1998, 2001	43.75%	1957, 1958, 1961, 1964, 2003, 2004, 2021
Raja CA	9	6	15	60%	1974, 1977, 1982, 1996, 2002, 2005, 2012, 2017, 2023	40%	1965, 1968, 1983, 1992, 2013, 2022
Fath Union Sport	6	3	9	66.67%	1967, 1973, 1976, 1995, 2010, 2014	33.33%	1960, 2009, 2015
KAC Marrakech	6	2	8	75%	1963, 1964, 1965, 1987, 1991, 1993	25%	1962, 1997
Maghreb Fez	4	8	12	33.33%	1980, 1988, 2011, 2016	66.67%	1966, 1971, 1974, 1993, 2001, 2002, 2008, 2010
MC Oujda	4	1	5	80%	1957, 1958, 1960, 1962	20%	1959
RS Berkane	3	3	6	50%	2018, 2021, 2022	50%	1987, 2014, 2024
Olympique Casablanca	3	—	3	100%	1983, 1990, 1992	0%	—
Olympique Khouribga	2	4	6	33.33%	2006, 2015	66.67%	1989, 1994, 1995, 2005
SCC Mohammédia	2	2	4	50%	1972, 1975	50%	1979, 1999
Difaâ Hassani El Jadidi	1	4	5	20%	2013	80%	1977, 1985, 1986, 2017
Kénitra AC	1	3	4	25%	1961	75%	1969, 1976, 1991
RS Settat	1	3	4	25%	1969	75%	1967, 1970, 2000
COD Meknès	1	2	3	33.33%	1966	66.67%	1981, 2011
Racing Casablanca	1	1	2	50%	1968	50%	1972
Olympic Safi	1	1	2	50%	2024	50%	2016
Majd Al-Madina	1	—	1	100%	2000	0%	—
Tihad AS	1	—	1	100%	2019	0%	—
Hassania Agadir	—	3	3	0%	—	100%	1963, 2006, 2019
Renaissance Kenitra	—	3	3	0%	—	100%	1978, 1982, 1984
US Sidi Kacem	—	2	2	0%	—	100%	1975, 1980
IZ Khemisset	—	1	1	0%	—	100%	1973
CR Bernoussi	—	1	1	0%	—	100%	2007
Wydad Fès	—	1	1	0%	—	100%	2018
MA Tétouan	—	1	1	0%	—	100%	2020

=== By city ===
City	Titles	Clubs
Casablanca	24	Wydad AC (9); Raja CA (9); Olympique Casablanca (3); Racing Casablanca (1); Majd Al-Madina (1); Tihad AS (1)
Rabat	18	AS FAR (12); Fath Union Sport (6)
Marrakesh	6	KAC Marrakech (6)
Fez	4	Maghreb Fez (4)
Oujda	4	MC Oujda (4)
Berkane	3	RS Berkane (3)
Khouribga	2	Olympique Club Khouribga (2)
Mohammedia	2	SCC Mohammédia (2)
Settat	1	RS Settat (1)
El Jadida	1	Difaâ Hassani El Jadidi (1)
Kenitra	1	Kénitra AC (1)
Meknes	1	COD Meknès (1)
Safi	1	Olympic Safi (1)
