= List of Wydad AC seasons =

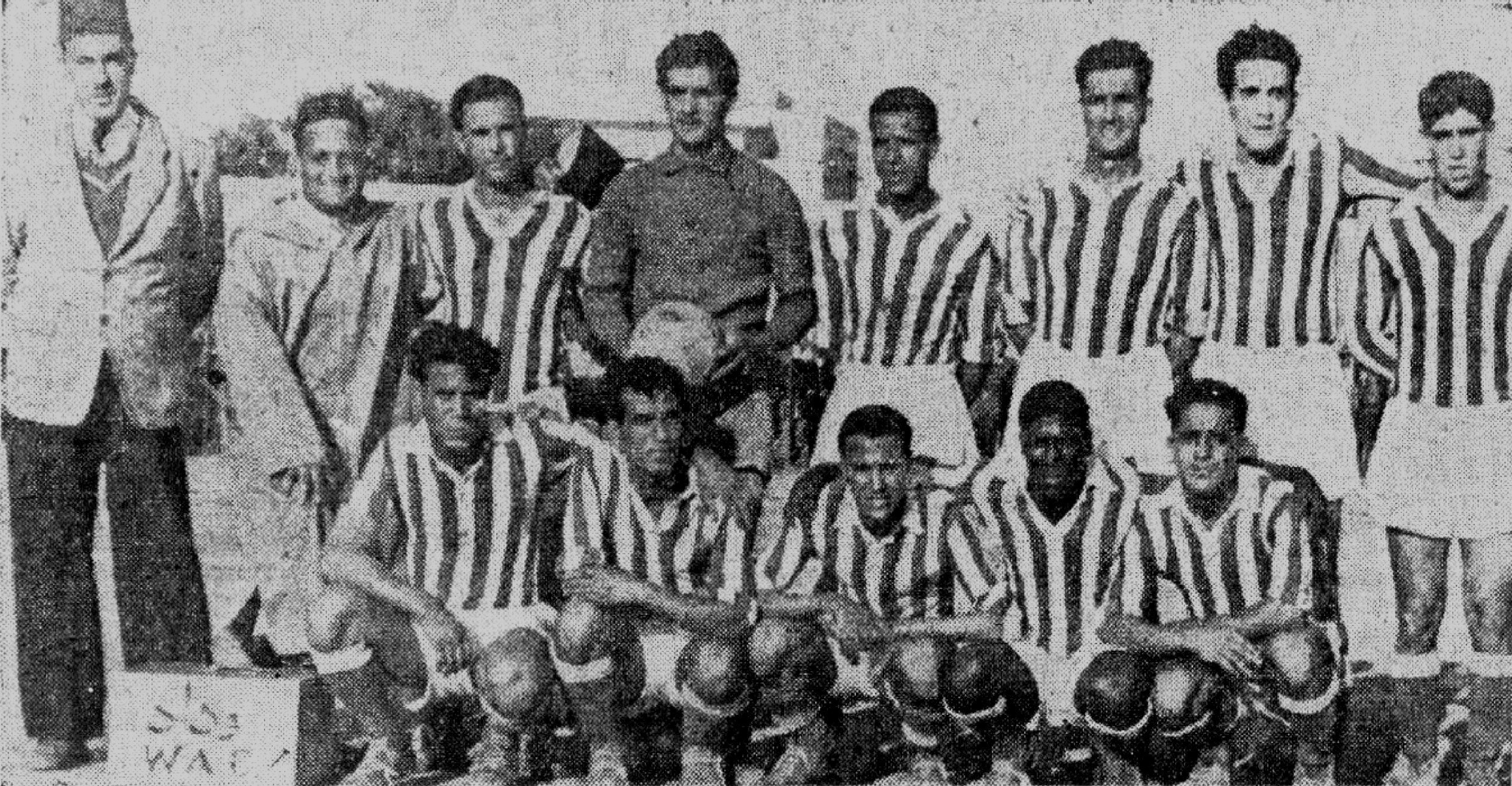
Wydad AC during 1949–50 season

Wydad Athletic Club (Arabic: نادي الوداد الرياضي, Arabic pronunciation: [naːdiː‿l.widaːd arrːiyːadˤiː]), is a Moroccan sports club based in Casablanca. Wydad AC is best known for its professional football team that competes in Botola, the top tier of the Moroccan football league system. They are one of three clubs to have never been relegated from the top flight.

Domestically, Wydad has won a record of 22 Moroccan league titles, 9 Moroccan Throne Cup and one Independence Cup, becoming the most titled club in Morocco. In continental, international and regional competitions, the club has won three CAF Champions Leagues, one African Cup Winners' Cup, one CAF Super Cup, one Afro-Asian Club Championship, one Mohammed V Cup, one Arab Club Champions Cup, one Arab Super Cup, three North African Championship and one North African Cup.

== Key ==
Key to divisions and league record:

- Pld = Matches played
- W = Matches won
- D = Matches drawn
- L = Matches lost
- GF = Goals for
- GA = Goals against
- GD = Goal difference
- Pts = Points
- Pos = Final position

Key to rounds:

- R1 = First round
- R2 = Second round
- POF = Play-off round
- R32 = Round of 32
- R16 = Round of 16
- GS = Group stage
- QF = Quarter-finals
- SF = Semi-finals

Key to colours and symbols:

1st place/winner
2nd place/runner-up
Promoted
Reached next stage of competition
Top goalscorer in the League

== List of seasons ==
Correct as of the end of the 2024–25 season. (Note: From 1956–57 until 1994–95, two points were awarded for a win, and one for a draw. From the 1995–96 season onwards, three points have been awarded for a win.)

Season	League											Moroccan Throne Cup	Continental		Other		Top scorer(s) (Note: Only league goals are counted.)	
Season	Division	Pld	W	D	L	GF	GA	GD	Pts	Pos	Playoffs	Moroccan Throne Cup	Competition	Result	Competition	Result	Player(s)	Goals
1939–40	Critérium de guerre (Groupe Chaouia) (Note: Due to the outbreak of World War II coinciding with Wydad’s first season, the Moroccan Football League (LMFA) decided, in order to reduce team travel, to change the league system by abolishing the two-division format and having all teams play in regional groups. The top-placed teams in each group qualified for a knockout playoff stage. The league was played under this system for six seasons: 1939–40, 1940–41, and from 1942–43 to 1945–46.)	18	11	2	5	48	21	+27	40	3rd	RU	–	—	–	–			
1940–41	Critérium de guerre (Groupe Chaouia)	18	11	1	6	49	22	+27	41	3rd	POF	–	—	–	–			
1941–42	Division de Promotion (Groupe Centre) (Note: After the LMFA decided to restore the championship to its normal format (the two-division system) in the 1941–42 season, it relied on the results of the 1938–39 season (the last season played under the normal format) to organize the teams into the two divisions. Since Wydad had not been among the participating teams at that time, it competed in the Promotion Division (second tier), like any new club that had to start in the lowest division.)	?	?	?	?	?	?	?	?	1st	W	–	—	–	North African Cup	R2		
1942–43	~~Division d'Honneur~~ (Note: As in the previous season, the 1942–43 league season began under its normal format (the two-division system). However, after four rounds had been played, and due to the Allied-occupation of Morocco in November 1942, the LMFA once again decided to restart the league using the regional group system, as had been the case in the 1939–40 and 1940–41 seasons. The league continued under this system for four consecutive seasons until 1945–46.)	~~4~~	~~3~~	~~1~~	~~0~~	~~11~~	~~1~~	~~+10~~	~~11~~	~~1st~~	–	–	—	–	–			
1942–43	Critérium de guerre (Groupe Chaouia)	?	?	?	?	?	?	?	?	5th	RU	–	—	–	–			
1943–44	Critérium de guerre (Groupe Chaouia)	?	?	?	?	?	?	?	?	?		–	—	–	–			
1944–45	Critérium de guerre (Groupe Chaouia)	18	?	?	?	?	?	+27	43	3rd	QF	–	—	–	–			
1945–46	Critérium de guerre (Groupe Sud)	22	19	2	1	54	14	+40	62	1st	RU	–	—	–	–			
1946–47	Division d'Honneur	26	14	3	9	57	32	+25	57	5th	–	–	—	–	North African Cup	R3	Abdesselem	13
1947–48	Division d'Honneur	18	14	2	2	47	20	+27	48	1st	–	–	—	–	North African Cup	W	Abdesselem	12
1947–48	Division d'Honneur	18	14	2	2	47	20	+27	48	1st	–	–	—	–	North African Cup	R4	Abdesselem	12
1948–49	Division d'Honneur	22	18	3	1	62	14	+48	61	1st	–	–	—	–	North African Cup	W	Abdesselem	21
1949–50	Division d'Honneur	22	17	4	1	61	16	+46	60	1st	–	–	—	–	North African Cup	W	Driss	20
1949–50	Division d'Honneur	22	17	4	1	61	16	+46	60	1st	–	–	—	–	North African Cup	R16	Driss	20
1950–51	Division d'Honneur	22	12	8	2	40	18	+22	54	1st	–	–	—	–	North African Cup	SF	Abdesselem	11
1950–51	Division d'Honneur	22	12	8	2	40	18	+22	54	1st	–	–	—	–	North African Cup	RU	Abdesselem	11
1951–52	Division d'Honneur	22	12	8	2	34	19	+15	54	2nd	–	–	—	–	North African Cup	R32	Abdesselem Driss Bouarif	5
1952–53	Division d'Honneur	22	12	1	9	37	32	+5	47	4th	–	–	—	–	North African Cup	RU	Driss	7
1953–54	Division d'Honneur	22	7	10	5	23	26	+4	48	5th	–	–	—	–	North African Cup	R32	(France) Gomez	10
1954–55	Division d'Honneur	22	11	6	5	30	18	+12	50	1st	–	–	—	–	North African Cup	RU	(France) Gomez	6
1954–55	Division d'Honneur	22	11	6	5	30	18	+12	50	1st	–	–	—	–	North African Cup	R16	(France) Gomez	6
1955–56	No national competitions were played in 1955–56 season due to political conflicts during the French Protectorate										–	–	—	–	North African Cup	R32	–	–
1956–57 (Note: First season under the rule of Royal Moroccan Football Federation which replaced the Moroccan Football League (LMFA))	Division Nationale I	30	18	7	5	51	23	+28	73	1st	–	RU	—	–	North African Cup	—	(France) Gomez	15
1957–58	Division Nationale I	28	15	11	2	34	16	+18	69	2nd	–	RU	—	–	North African Cup	—		
1958–59	Division Nationale I	26	12	8	6	50	22	+28	58	2nd	–	R16	—	–	North African Cup	—	(Morocco) Khalfi	21
1959–60	Division Nationale I	24	10	9	5	28	20	+8	53	4th	–	QF	—	–	North African Cup	—		
1960–61	Division Nationale I	26	9	9	8	30	25	+5	53	7th	–	RU	—	–	North African Cup	—		
1961–62	Division Nationale I	26	10	8	8	29	26	+3	54	6th	–	R16	—	–	North African Cup	—		
1962–63	Division Nationale I	26	8	10	8	26	22	+4	52	6th	–	SF	—	–	North African Cup	—		
1963–64	Division Nationale I	26	7	12	7	26	26	0	52	6th	–	RU	—	–	North African Cup	—	(Morocco) Khalfi	9
1964–65	Division Nationale I	26	9	10	7	27	21	+6	54	5th	–	QF	—	–	North African Cup	—		
1965–66	Division Nationale I	26	11	9	6	26	18	+8	57	1st	–	R16	—	–	North African Cup	—	(Morocco) Khalfi	6
1966–67	Division Nationale I	30	9	16	5	35	23	+12	64	4th	–	QF	—	–	Mohammed V Cup	4th	(Morocco) Zahid	13
1967–68	Division Nationale I	34	12	11	11	34	29	+5	69	8th	–	R16	—	–	—			
1968–69	Division Nationale I	30	16	11	3	34	17	+17	73	1st	–	R32	—	–	—		(Algeria) Abbès	10
1969–70	Division Nationale I	30	11	11	8	23	17	+6	63	5th	–	W	—	–	Mohammed V Cup	4th		
1969–70	Division Nationale I	30	11	11	8	23	17	+6	63	5th	–	W	—	–	Maghreb Champions Cup	3rd		
1970–71	Division Nationale I	30	8	14	8	17	20	−3	60	7th	–	R32	—	–	Maghreb Cup Winners Cup	3rd		
1971–72	Division Nationale I	30	13	12	5	39	26	+13	68	2nd	–	R16	—	–	—		(Morocco) Samrhouni	6
1972–73	Division Nationale I	30	10	10	10	22	22	0	61	9th	–	R32	—	–	—			
1973–74	Division Nationale I	30	8	15	7	20	20	0	61	5th	–	SF	—	–	—			
1974–75	Division Nationale I	30	9	13	8	25	27	−2	61	9th	–	R32	—	–	—			
1975–76	Division Nationale I	30	17	9	4	52	22	+30	73	1st	–	R16	—	–	—		(Morocco) Lecheheb	16
1976–77	Division Nationale I	30	14	11	5	50	27	+23	69	1st	–	QF	—	–	Mohammed V Cup	4th		
1977–78	Division Nationale I	30	16	13	1	42	20	+22	75	1st	–	W	—	–	Mohammed V Cup	3rd	(Morocco) Cherif	16
1978–79	Division Nationale I	30	14	9	7	33	26	+7	67	3rd	–	W	—	–	Mohammed V Cup	W		
1979–80	Division Nationale I	30	12	13	5	38	25	+13	67	2nd	–	R16	—	–	—			
1980–81	Division Nationale I	38	17	9	12	44	32	+12	81	4th	–	W	—	–	—			
1981–82	Division Nationale I	34	12	15	7	41	31	+10	73	2nd	–	R16	—	–	—			
1982–83	Division Nationale I	30	9	18	3	31	19	+12	66	3rd	–	R16	—	–	—			
1983–84	Division Nationale I	30	11	10	9	30	29	+1	62	5th	–	R32	—	–	—			
1984–85	Division Nationale I	30	14	13	3	31	13	+18	71	4th	–	R16	—	–	—		(Morocco) M'jidou	11
1985–86	Division Nationale I	38	23	9	6	55	16	+39	93	1st	–	R32	—	–	—		(Morocco) Fakhreddine	15
1986–87	Division Nationale I (Group A)	22	10	6	6	35	15	+20	48	4th	–	R32	African Cup of Champions Clubs	R2	—		(Morocco) Nader	13
1986–87	Division Nationale I (Championship Playoff)	8	1	5	2	7	6	+1	15	6th	–	R32	African Cup of Champions Clubs	R2	—		(Morocco) Nader	13
1987–88	Division Nationale I	30	14	10	10	41	30	+11	72	4th	–	SF	—		—			
1988–89	Division Nationale I	30	10	13	7	37	26	+11	63	5th	–	W	—		Arab Club Champions Cup	W		
1989–90	Division Nationale I	30	15	12	3	45	21	+24	72	1st	–	R16	—		—		(Morocco) Nader	18
1990–91	Division Nationale I	30	18	6	6	35	21	+14	72	1st	–	QF	African Cup of Champions Clubs	QF	—		(Senegal) Ndao	12
1991–92	Division Nationale I	30	12	10	8	32	19	+13	64	3rd	–	R16	African Cup of Champions Clubs	W	Arab Super Cup	W		
1992–93	Division Nationale I	30	16	10	4	51	29	+22	72	1st	–	QF	CAF Super Cup	RU	Afro-Asian Club Championship	W	(Morocco) Fertout	18
1992–93	Division Nationale I	30	16	10	4	51	29	+22	72	1st	–	QF	African Cup of Champions Clubs	R2	Afro-Asian Club Championship	W	(Morocco) Fertout	18
1993–94	Division Nationale I	30	10	12	3	38	15	+23	66**	2nd	–	W	African Cup of Champions Clubs	R2	—			
1994–95	Division Nationale I	30	11	13	6	24	18	+6	65	5th	–	R16	—		—			
1995–96	Division Nationale I	30	13	8	9	36	27	+9	47	3rd	–	QF	—		—		(Morocco) Loumari	15
1996–97	Division Nationale I	30	14	11	5	47	21	+26	53	2nd	–	W	—		—			
1997–98	GNF 1	30	14	9	7	33	18	+15	51	3rd	–	W	African Cup Winners' Cup	SF	—		(Senegal) Mbaye	7
1998–99	GNF 1	30	14	10	6	46	27	+19	52	4th	–	R16	CAF Cup	RU	—			
1999–2000	GNF 1	30	14	12	4	37	18	+19	54	2nd	–	R16	CAF Cup	R2	—			
2000–01	GNF 1	30	8	17	5	34	25	+9	40**	7th	–	W	CAF Cup	QF	—		(Morocco) Benchrifa	8
2001–02	GNF 1	30	18	8	4	38	12	+26	62	2nd	–	R16	African Cup Winners' Cup	W	—		(Morocco) Benchrifa	10
2002–03	GNF 1	30	13	13	4	25	15	+10	52	3rd	–	RU	CAF Super Cup	RU	—		(Morocco) Raji	6
2002–03	GNF 1	30	13	13	4	25	15	+10	52	3rd	–	RU	African Cup Winners' Cup	SF	—		(Morocco) Raji	6
2003–04	GNF 1	30	12	13	5	19	8	+11	49	4th	–	RU	CAF Confederation Cup	POF	—		(Morocco) Raji (Morocco) Madihi	3
2004–05	GNF 1	30	12	14	4	32	14	+18	50	3rd	–	R32	—		Arab Champions League	QF	(Morocco) Benchrifa	6
2005–06	GNF 1	30	17	10	3	33	16	+17	61	1st	–	R16	—		Arab Champions League	QF	(Morocco) Sarsar	7
2006–07	GNF 1	30	11	14	5	30	20	+10	47	4th	–	SF	CAF Champions League	R2	—		(Morocco) Ajraoui	7
2006–07	GNF 1	30	11	14	5	30	20	+10	47	4th	–	SF	CAF Confederation Cup	POF	—		(Morocco) Ajraoui	7
2007–08	GNF 1	30	10	12	8	28	23	+5	42	7th	–	R16	—		Arab Champions League	RU	(Morocco) Bidoudane	7
2008–09	GNF 1	30	13	11	6	26	17	+9	50	4th	–	QF	—		Arab Champions League	RU	(Morocco) Bidoudane	6
2009–10	Botola 1	30	15	9	6	36	22	+14	54	1st	–	R16	—		—		(Republic of the Congo) Mouithys	10
2010–11	Botola 1	30	13	12	5	31	18	+13	51	3rd	–	SF	CAF Champions League	RU	North African Cup of Champions	SF	(Republic of the Congo) Ondama	9
2011–12	Botola Pro 1	30	13	12	5	32	18	+14	51	3rd	–	SF	CAF Confederation Cup	GS	—		(Morocco) Iajour (Morocco) Houassi	5
2012–13	Botola Pro 1	30	13	9	8	31	22	+9	48	4th	–	QF	CAF Confederation Cup	R2	—		(Republic of the Congo) Ondama (Republic of the Congo) Mouithys (Ivory Coast) Anderson	5
2013–14	Botola Pro 1	30	10	13	7	34	29	+5	43	6th	–	R16	—		—		(Gabon) Evouna	8
2014–15	Botola Pro 1	30	16	11	3	48	21	+27	59	1st	–	R16	—		—		(Gabon) Evouna	16
2015–16	Botola Pro 1	30	16	8	6	34	19	+15	56	2nd	–	R16	CAF Champions League	SF	—		(Morocco) Hajhouj	9
2016–17	Botola Pro 1	30	19	9	2	50	24	+26	66	1st	–	R16	CAF Champions League	W	—		(Liberia) Jebor	19
2017–18	Botola Pro 1	30	14	9	7	44	26	+18	51	2nd	–	SF	CAF Champions League	W	FIFA Club World Cup	Fifth place	(Morocco) Nahiri	9
2017–18	Botola Pro 1	30	14	9	7	44	26	+18	51	2nd	–	SF	CAF Champions League	QF	FIFA Club World Cup	Fifth place	(Morocco) Nahiri	9
2018–19	Botola Pro 1	30	17	8	5	56	30	+26	59	1st	–	R32	CAF Champions League	RU	Arab Champions League	R2	(Nigeria) Babatunde	8
2019–20	Botola Pro 1	30	17	8	5	52	28	+24	59	2nd	–	SF	CAF Champions League	SF	Arab Champions League	R2	(Morocco) Jabrane (Democratic Republic of the Congo) Kasengu	8
2020–21	Botola Pro 1	30	20	7	3	58	26	+32	67	1st	–	RU	CAF Champions League	SF	—		(Morocco) El Kaabi	18
2021–22	Botola Pro 1	30	19	6	5	46	24	+22	63	1st	–	SF	CAF Champions League	W	—		(Republic of the Congo) Mbenza	16
2022–23	Botola Pro 1	30	19	9	2	47	21	+26	66	2nd	–	R32	CAF Super Cup	RU	FIFA Club World Cup	R2	(Senegal) Sambou	13
2022–23	Botola Pro 1	30	19	9	2	47	21	+26	66	2nd	–	R32	CAF Champions League	RU	FIFA Club World Cup	R2	(Senegal) Sambou	13
2023–24	Botola Pro 1	30	12	8	10	31	27	+4	44	6th	–	R16	African Football League	RU	Arab Champions League	GS	(Nigeria) Ade Oguns	6
2023–24	Botola Pro 1	30	12	8	10	31	27	+4	44	6th	–	R16	CAF Champions League	GS	Arab Champions League	GS	(Nigeria) Ade Oguns	6
2024–25	Botola Pro 1	30	14	12	4	45	27	+18	54	3rd	–	–	—	—	FIFA Club World Cup	GS	Rayhi	11
