= List of IR Tanger seasons =

Football club historical record

The Moroccan football club Ittihad Tanger (IR Tanger), since its foundation in 1983, has played in the first and second divisions of the Botola league. It came top of the league for the first time in 2017–18. The club has three times reached the semifinals of the Moroccan Throne Cup.

== League and cup ==
Season	League									Top league scorer(s)		Moroccan Cup
Season	Div.	Pld	W	D	L	GF	GA	Pts	Pos.	Player(s)	Goals	Moroccan Cup
1983-84	Botola 2											
1984-85	Botola 2											Round of 16
1985-86	Botola 2											?
1986-87	Botola 2								2nd			?
1987-88	Botola	34	12	9	13	29	27	67	8th			?
1988-89	Botola	30	10	11	9	25	25	61	8th			?
1989-90	Botola	30	12	12	6	33	22	66	2nd			Round of 16
1990-91	Botola	30	12	9	9	41	39	63	3rd			?
1991-92	Botola	30	9	9	12	30	41	57	13th			?
1992-93	Botola	30	11	9	10	21	22	61	7th			?
1993-94	Botola	30	8	12	10	26	29	58	12th			Quarter-finals
1994-95	Botola	30	4	18	8	15	23	56	13th			?
1995-96	Botola	30	4	6	20	13	36	18	16th	(Morocco) Mohamed Khoubach	5	Semi-finals
1996-97	Botola 2								2nd			?
1997-98	Botola	30	5	8	17	19	36	23	16th			?
1998-99	Botola 2	30	11	8	11	38	29	41	6th			Round of 16
1999-2000	Botola 2	30	14	5	11	41	34	47	4th			Round of 32
2000-01	Botola 2	30	17	9	4	52	22	60	1st	(Morocco) Ahmed Charkaoui	24	Quarter-finals
2001-02	Botola	30	6	13	11	27	35	31	14th	(Morocco) Ahmed Charkaoui		Round of 32
2002-03	Botola	30	7	9	14	22	38	30	15th			Round of 32
2003-04	Botola	30	7	13	10	15	19	34	12th			Round of 32
2004-05	Botola	30	6	15	9	19	28	33	14th	(Senegal) Ousmane Diop	7	Round of 32
2005-06	Botola	30	6	11	13	22	29	29	14th	(Morocco) Réda Amghar	8	Round of 32
2006-07	Botola	30	5	11	14	21	30	26	15th	(Morocco) Mehdi Arrafi	7	Semi-finals
2007-08	Botola 2	30	10	12	8	19	18	42	5th			Round of 32
2008-09	Botola 2	34	8	20	7	27	26	44	9th			Round of 32
2009-10	Botola 2	36	10	12	14	28	33	42	13th	(Morocco) Ibrahim Ouchrif	9	5th Round
2010-11	Botola 2	34	9	13	12	28	33	40	11th	(Morocco) Younes Fathi & (Morocco) Hamza Laaroussi Flihi	5	Round of 32
2011-12	Botola 2	30	6	16	8	21	26	34	13th	(Morocco) Younes Fathi	6	5th Round
2012-13	Botola 2	30	8	9	13	27	34	33	13th	(Morocco) Bilal Danguir	7	5th Round
2013-14	Botola 2	30	12	12	6	33	21	48	3rd	(Morocco) Ahmed Hammoudan	12	Round of 32
2014-15	Botola 2	30	13	15	2	22	11	54	1st	(Morocco) Badr Zaki Nacer & (Guinea) Aboubacar Kourouma	4	Round of 32
2015-16	Botola	30	14	8	8	36	23	50	3rd	(Ivory Coast) Hervé Guy	7	Quarter-finals
2016-17	Botola	30	12	9	9	33	25	45	5th	(Morocco) Ahmed Hammoudan	6	Semi-finals
2017-18	Botola	30	14	10	6	34	23	52	1st	(Morocco) Mehdi Naghmi	13	Round of 16
2018–19	Botola	30	9	13	8	27	30	40	5th	(Morocco) Mehdi Naghmi	9	Round of 16
2019–20	Botola	30	7	11	12	20	36	32	14th	(Morocco) Sofian El Moudane	4	Quarter-finals
2020–21	Botola	30	10	6	14	29	36	36	8th	(Gabon) Axel Méyé	12	Round of 16
2021–22	Botola	30	8	9	13	31	41	33	13th	(Gabon) Axel Méyé	12	Round of 16
2022–23	Botola	30	8	5	17	23	39	29	14th	(Morocco) Sofian El Moudane	5	Round of 16
2023–24	Botola	30	7	12	11	29	38	33	12th	(Morocco) Ismail Khafi	13	Round of 32
2024–25	Botola	30	9	10	11	35	37	37	10th	(Morocco) Ali El Harrak & (Morocco) Hamza El Wasti	7	Round of 32
2025–26	Botola	30	9	12	9	27	31	39	7th	(Morocco) Haitam El Bahja	8	

- 27 seasons in Botola
- 16 seasons in Botola 2

== African competitions ==
As of match played 19 January 2019

Competition	Pld	W	D	L	GF	GA	GD
CAF Champions League	4	2	1	1	2	2	0
CAF Confederation Cup	8	4	1	3	10	9	+1
Total	12	6	2	4	12	11	+1

Year	Competition	Round	Opponent	Home	Away	Aggregate
2017	CAF Confederation Cup	PR	(Niger) AS Douanes	1–0	2–1^{f}	3–1
2017	CAF Confederation Cup	1R	(Guinea) AS Kaloum	3–0	0–1^{f}	3–1
2017	CAF Confederation Cup	PO	(Guinea) Horoya AC	3–2	0–2^{f}	3–4
2018–19	CAF Champions League	PR	(Chad) Elect-Sport FC	1–0^{f}	0–0	1–0
2018–19	CAF Champions League	1R	(Algeria) JS Saoura	1–0	0–2^{f}	1–2
2018–19	CAF Confederation Cup	PO	(Egypt) Zamalek SC	0–0^{f}	1–3	1–3

^{f} First leg.

Notes

- PR: Preliminary round
- 1R: First round
- PO: Play-off round

== Arab competitions ==
As of match played 24 August 2019

Competition	Pld	W	D	L	GF	GA	GD
Arab Club Champions Cup	3	2	0	1	9	3	+6

Year	Competition	Round	Opponent	Score	Position
2019–20	Arab Club Champions Cup	PR	(Bahrain) Riffa SC	0–2	2nd
2019–20	Arab Club Champions Cup	PR	(Iraq) Al-Zawraa SC	3–0	2nd
2019–20	Arab Club Champions Cup	PR	(Somalia) Horseed FC	1–6	2nd

Notes

- PR: Preliminary round
