= Moroccan Super Cup =

- Founded: 1957
- Abolished: 1975
- Region: Morocco
- Teams: 2
- Last champions: SCC Mohammédia (1 title)
- Most championships: AS FAR (4 titles)

The Moroccan Super Cup was a one-match football tournament that was held at the end of each season between the Botola Pro champions and the Throne Cup winners.

== History ==
This cup was initially called the Federal Cup and then later bore the name of the Youth Cup, and it was supervised by the Royal Moroccan Football Federation. The first edition of this cup was played in the 1956–57 season, and it was played for four consecutive seasons, then it stopped 10 years for unknown reasons, to return again in the 1974–75 season, and this season's match was delayed to March of the year 1976 to be held in the city of Laayoune on the occasion of the Green March, which noticed SCC Mohammédia winning the last edition of this cup.

== Results of the finals ==
Year	Botola Champions	Result	Moroccan Throne Cup Winners	Venue
1957	Wydad AC	6–2	Mouloudia Oujda	Casablanca
1958	Kawkab Marrakech	0–1	Mouloudia Oujda	Marrakesh
1959	Étoile de Casablanca	0–2	AS FAR	Casablanca
1960	KAC Kénitra	1–0	Mouloudia Oujda	Kenitra
1961	AS FAR	1–0	KAC Kénitra	Rabat
1962	AS FAR	5–3	Mouloudia Oujda	Kenitra
1963	AS FAR	4–1	Kawkab Marrakech	Rabat
1964	AS FAR	0–1	Kawkab Marrakech	Marrakesh
1965	MAS Fès	2–1	Kawkab Marrakech	Fez
1966	Wydad AC	3–2	COD Meknès	Casablanca
1967–1974	Not play			
1975	Mouloudia Oujda	0–1	SCC Mohammédia	Laayoune

== Performance by club ==
Club	Winners	Winning years
AS FAR	4	1959, 1961, 1962, 1963
Wydad AC	2	1957, 1966
Mouloudia Oujda	1	1958
KAC Kénitra	1	1960
Kawkab Marrakech	1	1964
MAS Fès	1	1965
SCC Mohammédia	1	1975
