= 1981–82 Moroccan Throne Cup =

Tournament details
- Country: Morocco

Final positions
- Champions: Raja Club Athletic
- Runners-up: Renaissance de Kénitra

The 1981–82 season of the Moroccan Throne Cup was the 26th edition of the tournament.

Raja Club Athletic won the cup, beating Renaissance de Kénitra 1–0 in the final, played at the Stade Mohammed V in Casablanca. Raja Club Athletic won the competition for the third time in their history.

== Tournament ==
=== Last 16 ===
Team 1	Team 2	Result
Wydad Athletic Club	KAC Kénitra	1–2
Raja Club Athletic	Rachad Bernoussi	2–1
Maghreb de Fès	FAR de Rabat	1–0
CODM Meknès	Renaissance de Berkane	2–1
Renaissance de Settat	Renaissance de Kénitra	2–3
Kawkab Marrakech	Mouloudia Club d'Oujda	0–2
Union de Sidi Kacem	AS Salé	2–0
Chabab Meknès	Chabab Mohammédia	1–4

=== Quarter-finals ===
Team 1	Team 2	Result
CODM Meknès	Renaissance de Kénitra	0–2
Raja Club Athletic	KAC Kénitra	1–0
Maghreb de Fès	Mouloudia Club d'Oujda	1–0
Union de Sidi Kacem	Chabab Mohammédia	0–1

=== Semi-finals ===
Team 1	Team 2	Result
Maghreb de Fès	Renaissance de Kénitra	2–3
Raja Club Athletic	Chabab Mohammédia	4–0

=== Final ===
The final featured the winners of the two semi-finals, Raja Club Athletic and Renaissance de Kénitra, on 14 March 1982 at the Stade Mohammed V in Casablanca.

1981–82 Moroccan Throne Cup
14 March 1982
Final

Raja Club Athletic	1–0	Renaissance de Kénitra
	Report

Stade Mohammed V, Casablanca
Referee: Hassan Chafai
