= 1997–98 Moroccan Throne Cup =

Tournament details
- Country: Morocco

Final positions
- Champions: Wydad Athletic Club

The 1997–98 season of the Moroccan Throne Cup was the 42nd edition of the competition.

Wydad Athletic Club won the cup, beating FAR de Rabat 1–0 in the final, played at the Prince Moulay Abdellah Stadium in Rabat. Wydad Athletic Club won the competition for the eighth time in their history.

== Tournament ==
=== Last 32 ===
==== Northern Group ====
Team 1	Team 2	Result
Maghreb de Fès	CODM Meknès	0–0
Fath Union Sport	FAR de Rabat	0–1
Wydad de Fès	AS Salé	2–2
Chabab Atlas Khénifra	Union de Mohammédia	1–0
Chabab Mohammédia	Sporting de Salé	1–0
Chabab Rif Al Hoceima	Mouloudia Club d'Oujda	1–1
KAC Kénitra	Amal Club de Belksiri	3–0
Ittihad Khemisset	Ittihad Tanger	0–2

==== Southern Group ====
Team 1	Team 2	Result
Olympic Club de Safi	JS Massira	1–0
Chabab Hay Hassani	Raja Club Athletic	0–3
Wydad Athletic Club	Tihad Sportif Casablanca	2–1
Nakl de Casablanca	Hassania d'Agadir	0–0
Racing de Casablanca	Kawkab Marrakech	0–1
Wydad Kelaat Sraghna	Olympique de Khouribga	1–2
TAS de Casablanca	Raja de Beni Mellal	2–0
Difaâ Hassani El Jadidi	Renaissance de Settat	1–1

=== Last 16 ===
Team 1	Team 2	Result
Difaâ Hassani El Jadidi	Mouloudia d'Oujda	2–0
Maghreb de Fès	KAC Kénitra	1–2
FAR de Rabat	Hassania d'Agadir	2–1
Wydad Athletic Club	Kawkab Marrakech	3–1
Raja Club Athletic	Chabab Atlas Khénifra	5–0
Olympique de Khouribga	Olympic Club de Safi	3–0
Wydad de Fès	Chabab Mohammédia	0–2
Ittihad Tanger	TAS de Casablanca	0–1

=== Quarter-finals ===
Team 1	Team 2	Result
TAS de Casablanca	Olympique de Khouribga	1–2
Raja Club Athletic	Wydad Athletic Club	0–1
FAR de Rabat	KAC Kénitra	1–0
Difaâ Hassani El Jadidi	Chabab Mohammédia	2–1

=== Semi-finals ===
Team 1	Team 2	Result
Wydad Athletic Club	Difaâ Hassani El Jadidi	1–0
FAR de Rabat	Olympique de Khouribga	1–0

=== Final ===
The final was played between the two winning semi-finalists, Wydad Athletic Club and FAR de Rabat, on 11 July 1999 at the Prince Moulay Abdellah Stadium in Rabat. Due to an interruption, the final was played very late.

1997–98 Moroccan Throne Cup Final
11 July 1999

Wydad Athletic Club	2–1	FAR de Rabat
	Report

Prince Moulay Abdellah Stadium, Rabat
Referee: Said Belqola
