= Mohamed Timoumi =

Moroccan footballer (born 1960)

Personal information
- Date of birth: 25 August 1960 (age 66)
- Place of birth: Rabat, Morocco
- Height: 1.75 m (5 ft 9 in)
- Position: Attacking midfielder

Senior career*
| Years | Team | Apps | (Gls) |
| 1978–1982 | US Touarga | | |
| 1982–1986 | AS FAR | | |
| 1986–1987 | Murcia | 29 | (2) |
| 1987–1989 | KSC Lokeren | 31 | (5) |
| 1989–1990 | OC Khouribga | | |
| 1990–1993 | Al-Suwaiq | | |
| 1993–1994 | CO Casablanca | | |
| 1994–1995 | AS FAR | | |

International career
| 1979–1990 | Morocco | 63 | (10) |
Medal record
Men's football
Representing Morocco
Africa Cup of Nations
| Third place | 1980 Nigeria |
- * Club domestic league appearances and goals

Mohamed Timoumi (Arabic: محمد التيمومي; born 15 January 1960) is a Moroccan former footballer who played as an attacking midfielder. He was named African Footballer of the Year in 1985, and was the last player to win this award while playing club football in an African country. In 2006, he was selected by CAF as one of the best 200 African football players of the last 50 years.

== Career ==
Timoumi took part in the 1986 FIFA World Cup in Mexico. At club level, he won the CAF Champions League with FAR Rabat, the biggest Moroccan football club of his era. He also competed for Morocco at the 1984 Summer Olympics.

Timoumi played at a young age for the team of the Union of Touarga, where he was the youngest player. It was there where he was first noticed by the observers and experts of Moroccan football.

His burgeoning talent led him to join one of the biggest Moroccan clubs: FAR Rabat, with whom he won the CAF Champions League in 1985.

In 1985, his talent exploded despite a fracture during the FAR Rabat match against the Egyptian team Zamalek in the semifinals. During this year, Timoumi was, in the unanimous opinion of the international sports press, the star of Africa. He also received the African Ballon d'Or.

A year later, he participated in the final phase of the 1986 World Cup in Mexico. In Mexico City, he was considered one of the most important elements of the Moroccan selection. Morocco ranked first in its group with 0 defeats and a resounding victory against Portugal 3–1. This result allowed Morocco to be the first African and Arab country to reach the round of 16 of the FIFA World Cup.

== Career statistics ==
=== International ===
Scores and results list Morocco's goal tally first, score column indicates score after each Morocco goal.

List of international goals scored by Mohamed Timoumi
| No. | Date | Venue | Opponent | Score | Result | Competition |
|---|---|---|---|---|---|---|
| 1 | 25 February 1980 | Stade Mohammed V, Casablanca, Morocco | Senegal | 1–0 | 2–3 | Friendlies |
| 2 | 22 June 1980 | Dakar, Senegal | Senegal | 1–0 | 1-0 | 1982 FIFA World Cup qualification |
| 3 | 22 January 1985 | Cochin, India | Algeria | 1–0 | 4-0 | Nehru Cup |
| 4 | 26 January 1985 | Cochin, India | South Korea | 1–2 | 2-2 | Nehru Cup |
| 5 | 28 July 1985 | Casablanca, Morocco | Egypt | 1–0 | 2-0 | 1986 FIFA World Cup qualification |
| 6 | 22 January 1985 | Mohammédia, Morocco | Somalia | 1–0 | 3-0 | 1985 Pan Arab Games |
| 7 | 10 August 1985 | Casablanca, Morocco | Mauritania | 1–0 | 3-0 | 1985 Pan Arab Games |
| 8 | 6 October 1985 | Rabat, Morocco | Libya | 2–0 | 3-0 | 1986 FIFA World Cup qualification |
| 9 | 23 April 1986 | Belfast, Northern Ireland | Northern Ireland | 1–0 | 1-2 | Friendlies |
| 10 | 25 June 1989 | Lusaka, Zambia | Zambia | 1–0 | 1-2 | 1990 FIFA World Cup qualification |

== Honours ==
AS FAR

- Botola Pro: 1984
- Moroccan Throne Cup: 1984, 1985
- CAF Champions League: 1985

Morocco

- Mediterranean Games: 1983
- Africa Cup of Nations third place: 1980
- Pan Arab Games runner-up: 1985
- Nehru Cup third place: 1985

Individual

- African Footballer of the Year: 1985
- Moroccan Footballer of the Year: 1985
- CAF Champions League Player of the Tournament: 1985
- African Footballer of the 20th century: 30th place
- IFFHS All-time Morocco Men's Dream Team
