= 1985–86 Moroccan Throne Cup =

Tournament details
- Country: Morocco

Final positions
- Champions: FAR de Rabat

The 1985–86 season of the Moroccan Throne Cup was the 30th edition of the competition.

FAR de Rabat won the cup, beating Difaâ Hassani El Jadidi 3–1 in the final, played at the Prince Moulay Abdellah Stadium in Rabat. FAR de Rabat won the tournament for the fifth time in their history.

== Tournament ==
=== Last 16 ===
Team 1	Team 2	Result
Fath Union Sport	Renaissance de Berkane	1–2
Union de Sidi Kacem	ISC Casablanca	3–1
KAC Kénitra	Tihad Sakia Hamra	3–0
Maghreb de Fès	AS Salé	3–1
CODM Meknès	Union de Mohammédia	1–2
Kawkab Marrakech	Renaissance de Kénitra	1–0
Mouloudia Club d'Oujda	Difaâ Hassani El Jadidi	1–2
FAR de Rabat	Raja Club Athletic	2–0

=== Quarter-finals ===
Team 1	Team 2	Result
Union de Mohammédia	KAC Kénitra	0–1
Difaâ Hassani El Jadidi	Kawkab Marrakech	0–0; 5–4 (pens)
ISC Casablanca	FAR de Rabat	1–3
Maghreb de Fès	Renaissance de Berkane	1–0

=== Semi-finals ===
Team 1	Team 2	Result
FAR de Rabat	KAC Kénitra	5–3
Maghreb de Fès	Difaâ Hassani El Jadidi	0–1

=== Final ===
The final was between the two winning semi-finalists, FAR de Rabat and Difaâ Hassani El Jadidi, on 4 September 1986 at the Prince Moulay Abdellah Stadium in Rabat.

1985–86 Moroccan Throne Cup
4 September 1986
Final

FAR de Rabat	3–1	Difaâ Hassani El Jadidi
	Report

Prince Moulay Abdellah Stadium, Rabat
Referee: Omar Aboulkacim
