= 1971–72 Moroccan Throne Cup =

Tournament details
- Country: Morocco

Final positions
- Champions: Chabab Mohammédia; Racing de Casablanca

The 1971–72 season of the Moroccan Throne Cup was the 16th edition of the competition.

The two finalists, Chabab Mohammédia and Racing de Casablanca, were both declared winners in the final. Chabab Mohammédia and Racing de Casablanca both won the title for the first time in their history.

== Tournament ==
=== Last 16 ===
Team 1	Team 2	Result
Renaissance de Settat	Kawkab Marrakech	2–1
KAC Kénitra	Hassania d'Agadir	1–1; 4–5 (pens)
Mouloudia Club d'Oujda	Raja Club Athletic	3–1
Raja de Beni Mellal	Chabab Mohammédia	1–2
Difaâ Hassani El Jadidi	Fath Union Sport	1–0
Tihad Sportif Casablanca	Rapide Oued Zem	1–1; 4–3(pens)
Renaissance de Kénitra	Olympique de Boujniba	1–2
Racing de Casablanca	Wydad Athletic Club	1–1; 3–2 (pens)

=== Quarter-finals ===
Team 1	Team 2	Result
Racing de Casablanca	Renaissance de Settat	1–1; 4–3 (pens)
TAS de Casablanca	Olympique de Boujniba	2–2; 2–4 (pens)
Mouloudia Club d'Oujda	Chabab Mohammédia	1–0; 2–3 (pens)
Difaâ Hassani El Jadidi	Maghreb de Fès	1–1; 5–4 (pens)

=== Semi-finals ===
Team 1	Team 2	Result
Chabab Mohammédia	Difaâ Hassani El Jadidi	1–1; 4–2 (pens)
Racing de Casablanca	Olympique de Boujniba	6–1

=== Final ===
The final between the two winning semi-finalists, Chabab Mohammédia and Racing de Casablanca, did not take place, and both clubs were declared winners in 1972.

Moroccan Throne Cup
Final

Chabab Mohammédia	Final not played–0	Racing de Casablanca
	Report
