= Abderrahim Saïdi =

Moroccan football manager

Personal information
- Date of birth: June 2, 1983 (age 43)
- Place of birth: Oulfa, Casablanca, Morocco
- Height: 1.70 m (5 ft 7 in)
- Position: Winger

Team information
- Current team: MC Oujda (head coach)

Youth career
- 1996–2004: Wydad AC

Senior career*
| Years | Team | Apps | (Gls) |
| 2004–2009 | Wydad AC | 82 | (19) |
| 2009–2011 | MA Tétouan | | |
| 2011–2012 | RS Berkane | | |
| 2012–2013 | Wydad de Fès | 21 | (3) |
| 2013–2014 | KAC Marrakech | | |
| 2014–2015 | CR Al Hoceima | | |
| 2015–2016 | MC Oujda | | |
| 2016–2017 | IZ Khemisset | | |
| 2017–2019 | CJ Ben Guerir | | |

Managerial career
- 2021–2025: CJ Ben Guerir
- 2025–2026: Olympique Dcheira
- 2026–: MC Oujda
- * Club domestic league appearances and goals

Abderrahim Saïdi (born 2 June 1983) is a Moroccan football coach and former professional footballer who played as a winger. Saïdi is the current coach of Mouloudia Club d'Oujda, which currently plays in Botola Pro 2, the second highest division of Moroccan football.

== Early life ==
Saïdi was born in 1983 in Oulfa, Casablanca, Morocco. He joined Wydad AC's academy in 1996.

== Playing career ==
Saïdi began his playing career with Wydad AC, first participating with its senior team in 2004.

== Managerial career ==
He was previously the head coach of CJ Ben Guerir. He succeeded Hicham Louissi as the head coach of Olympique Dcheira in June 2025. His contract with Olympique Dcheira was mutually terminated in March 2026. He was appointed head coach of Mouloudia Club d'Oujda on 26 August 2026.
