= 1987–88 Moroccan Throne Cup =

Tournament details
- Country: Morocco

Final positions
- Champions: Maghreb de Fès

The 1987–88 season of the Moroccan Throne Cup was the 32nd edition of the competition.

Maghreb de Fès won the cup, beating FAR de Rabat 4–2 on penalties after a 0–0 draw in the final, played at the Prince Moulay Abdellah Stadium in Rabat. Maghreb de Fès won the tournament for the second time in their history.

== Competition ==
=== Last 16 ===
Team 1	Team 2	Result
Maghreb de Fès	Olympique de Casablanca	1–0
Olympique de Khouribga	FAR de Rabat	1–2
Kawkab Marrakech	CODM Meknès	1–0
Difaâ Hassani El Jadidi	Tihad Sportif Casablanca	2–0
Fath Union Sport	Chabab Mohammédia	1–0
Union de Sidi Kacem	KAC Kénitra	0–3
Renaissance de Kénitra	Raja Club Athletic	0–5
Olympic Club de Safi	Wydad Athletic Club	1–2

=== Quarter-finals ===
Team 1	Team 2	Result
Difaâ Hassani El Jadidi	Wydad Athletic Club	0–1
Fath Union Sport	FAR de Rabat	0–1
Raja Club Athletic	Maghreb de Fès	0–0; 3–5 (pens)
Kawkab Marrakech	KAC Kénitra	2–1

=== Semi-finals ===
Team 1	Team 2	Result
Wydad Athletic Club	Maghreb de Fès	1–2
Kawkab Marrakech	FAR de Rabat	3 –4

=== Final ===
The final was played between the two winning semi-finalists, Maghreb de Fès and FAR de Rabat, on 11 September 1988 at the Prince Moulay Abdellah Stadium in Rabat.

1987–88 Moroccan Throne Cup Final
Maghreb de Fès	FAR de Rabat
0 (5)	0 (3)
- http://www.goalzz.com/main.aspx?c=1666
- Date: September 11, 1988
- Venue: Prince Moulay Abdellah Stadium, Rabat
- Referee: Mohamed Jayed
