= Ahmed Qessab =

Moroccan footballer

Personal information
- Date of birth: April 15, 1981 (age 45)
- Place of birth: Marrakesh, Morocco
- Height: 1.70 m (5 ft 7 in)
- Position: Defender

Youth career
- ?–2000: Kawkab Marrakech

Senior career*
Years	Team	Apps	(Gls)
2000–2011	Kawkab Marrakech		
- * Club domestic league appearances and goals as of April 16, 2009

Ahmed Qessab (born 15 April 1981) is a Moroccan footballer who played as a defender. He is currently without a team and has spent his entire career at Kawkab Marrakech in the Botola.
