= 2010 Moroccan Throne Cup =

Tournament details
- Country: Morocco
- Dates: April 2010 – November 2010

Final positions
- Champions: Fath Union Sport

The 2010 season of the Moroccan Throne Cup was the 54th edition of the competition.

The cup was won by Fath Union Sport, who beat Maghreb de Fès in the final.

== Preliminary rounds ==
The preliminary rounds began in April 2010 and finished in August 2010. There were four rounds consisting of all teams from the amateur league, and teams from the second division of the professional league (from the 3rd round onwards).

=== 4th round ===
The fourth and final preliminary round took place between 7 and 9, and featured 32 teams from the 3rd and 2nd division of the Moroccan football championship:

Team 1	Team 2	Result
Ittihad Fkih Ben Salah	Racing Casablanca	1–0
US Mohammedia	FC Azza Azaq	5–1
Youssoufia Berrechid	Tihad Casablanca	2–1
Chabab Houara	Chabab Benguerir	2–1
Union Sidi Kacem	Ittihad Tanger	1–2
Wifaq Tenjdad	Chabab Darouich	1–0
Association Al Mansouria	Chabab Rif Al Hoceima	1 – 1 (1–4 pens)
Raja Al Hoceima	Chabab Atlas Khénifra	1–4
Hassania Bensergao	Chabab Kasba Tadla	0–3
Chabab Larache	US Temara	0–3
Club de Kasr Lakbir	CODM Meknès	0–2
Chabab Mohammedia	Amal Tiznit	2–0
Rachad Bernoussi	Renaissance Settat	1–0
Mouloudia Oujda	US Y. Al Mansour Rabat	4–0
Fath Riadi Nador	Stade Marocain	0–1
Rapide Oued Zem	Nouaceur Ouled Salah	0–1

== Last 32 ==
The last 32 of the competition played between 13 and 19.

== Final phases ==
=== Last 16 ===
The last 16 of the competition played between 5 and 15.

5 September 2010
22h15 UTC

Difaâ Hassani El Jadidi	0–0	AS Salé

Stade El Abdi, El Jadida
Referee: bouchaib al hrach
7 September 2010
22h15 UTC

Fath Union Sport	1–0 (a.e.t.)	Olympique de Khouribga

Prince Moulay Abdellah Stadium, Rabat

8 September 2010
15:30 UTC

Mouloudia d'Oujda	0–1	Moghreb Tétouan

Honneur Stadium, Oujda

8 September 2010
15:30 UTC

Hassania d'Agadir	0–2	Stade Marocain

Stade Al Inbiaate, Agadir

8 September 2010
22:15 UTC

Raja de Casablanca	1–1 (a.e.t.)	Chabab Mohammedia
Penalties
Penalty scored Penalty missed	3–4	Penalty scored

Stade Mohammed V, Casablanca

9 September 2010
22:15 UTC

Maghreb de Fès	1–1 (a.e.t.)	FAR de Rabat
Penalties
Penalty scored	7–6	Penalty scored Penalty missed

Fez Stadium, Fès

14 September 2010
16:00 UTC

KAC Kénitra	0–0 (a.e.t.)	CODM de Meknès
Penalties
Penalty scored	4–2	Penalty scored Penalty missed

Stade Municipal, Kénitra
Attendance: 12,000

15 September 2010
16:00 UTC

Youssoufia Berrechid	2–2 (a.e.t.)	Olympic Club de Safi
Penalties
Penalty scored Penalty missed	4–5	Penalty scored

Stade municipal de Berrechid, Berrechid

=== Quarter-finals ===
The quarter finals took place on 8 and 10 October 2010.

8 October 2010
15:00 UTC

Chabab Mohammedia	0–0 (a.e.t.)	Fath Union Sport
Penalties
Penalty scored Penalty missed	3–5	Penalty scored

Stade El Bachir, Mohammedia

8 October 2010
20:00 UTC

Maghreb de Fès	1–0	Stade Marocain

Fez Stadium, Fès

10 October 2010
15:00 UTC

KAC Kénitra	0–0 (a.e.t.)	Moghreb Tétouan
Penalties
Penalty scored	5–4	Penalty scored Penalty missed

Stade Municipal, Kénitra

10 October 2010
19:00 UTC

Olympic Club de Safi	0–0 (a.e.t.)	Difaâ d'El Jadida

Stade El Massira, Safi, Morocco

== Semi-finals ==
The semi-finals took place on 6.

6 November 2010
15:00 UTC

Maghreb de Fès	1–1 (a.e.t.)	KAC Kénitra
Penalties
Penalty scored	3–2	Penalty scored Penalty missed

Stade El Massira, Safi, Morocco

6 November 2010
18:00 UTC

Fath Union Sport	1–0	Difaâ d'El Jadida

Stade Mohammed V, Casablanca

== Final ==
The final of the 2009–2010 Moroccan Throne Cup took place on 25 in Rabat.

25 November 2010
16:45 UTC

Maghreb de Fès	1–2	Fath Union Sport

Prince Moulay Abdellah Stadium, Rabat

== Winner ==
Winner of the Moroccan Throne Cup 2009–2010
Fath Union Sport
5th title

=== Prize Fund ===
- Total prize fund: 3.5 million MAD,
- Winner: 1.5 million MAD,
- Finalist (2nd place) : 1 million MAD,
- Semi-finalists (3rd and 4th places): 0.5 Million MAD each.

== See also ==
- 2009–10 Botola
