= 1990–91 Moroccan Throne Cup =

Tournament details
- Country: Morocco

Final positions
- Champions: Kawkab Marrakech

The 1990–91 season of the Moroccan Throne Cup was the 35th edition of the competition.

Kawkab Marrakech won the cup, beating KAC Kénitra 2–1 in the final, played at the Prince Moulay Abdellah Stadium in Rabat. Kawkab Marrakech won the competition for the fifth time in their history.

== Competition ==
=== Last 16 ===
| Team 1 | Team 2 | Result |
|---|---|---|
| Kawkab Marrakech | Fath Union Sport | 4–1 |
| Raja de Beni Mellal | Mouloudia Club d'Oujda | 2–3 |
| Hilal de Nador | TAS de Casablanca | 2–4 |
| Raja Club Athletic | Crédit agricole Rabat | 2–0 |
| Wydad Athletic Club | Olympique de Casablanca | 2–0 |
| Maghreb de Fès | Renaissance de Settat | 3–2 |
| Chabab Mohammédia | KAC Kénitra | 0–1 |
| Olympique de Khouribga | FAR de Rabat | 0–1 |

=== Quarter-finals ===
| Team 1 | Team 2 | Result |
|---|---|---|
| Kawkab Marrakech | Mouloudia Club d'Oujda | 2–1 |
| KAC Kénitra | Raja Club Athletic | 2–1 |
| Wydad Athletic Club | TAS de Casablanca | 1–2 |
| Maghreb de Fès | FAR de Rabat | 2–1 |

=== Semi-finals ===
| Team 1 | Team 2 | Result |
|---|---|---|
| Kawkab Marrakech | Tihad Sportif Casablanca | 1–0 |
| Maghreb de Fès | KAC Kénitra | 1–2 |

=== Final ===
The final took place between the two winning semi-finalists, Kawkab Marrakech and KAC Kénitra, at the Prince Moulay Abdellah Stadium in Rabat.

1990–91 Moroccan Throne Cup
Final

| Kawkab Marrakech | 2–1 | KAC Kénitra |

Prince Moulay Abdellah Stadium, Rabat
Referee: Mustapha Zhar
