= Youssef Lemrini =

Moroccan footballer and manager

Personal information
- Date of birth: January 1, 1960 (age 66)
- Place of birth: Sale, Morocco

Team information
- Current team: Renaissance Sportive de Berkane

Managerial career
- Years: Team
- 2012–2013: COD Meknès
- 2013: Olympic Club de Safi
- 2013–: Renaissance Sportive de Berkane

Youssef Lemrini (born 1 January 1960 in Sale, Morocco) is a Moroccan football manager and former player.

== Clubs ==
Mouloudia Club Lakouablia
