= 1965–66 Moroccan Throne Cup =

Tournament details
- Country: Morocco

Final positions
- Champions: COD Meknès (1st title)
- Runners-up: MAS Fez

The 1965–66 season of the Moroccan Throne Cup was the tenth edition of the competition.

The clubs from Division 1 did not enter until the round of 16, while the clubs from lower divisions played preliminary rounds. Teams played one-legged matches. Until the quarter-finals, in case of a draw, the match would be replayed at the opponents' ground, but from the quarter-finals, a penalty shoot-out took place.

COD Meknès beat Maghreb de Fès 2–0 in the final, which was played at the Stade d'honneur in Casablanca. COD Meknès won the title for the first time.

== Tournament ==
The final took place between the two winning semi-finalists, COD Meknès and MAS Fez, on 12 June 1966 at the Stade d'honneur in Casablanca. The match was refereed by Mohamed Benjelloun. It was the first final for both rival clubs from Saïss. COD Meknès won the Saïss derby 2–0 thanks to goals from Bouazza ( 10'), and Hamidouch ( 62'). It was the first title for COD Meknès in the competition, and the first defeat in the final for Maghreb AS.
