= 1986–87 Moroccan Throne Cup =

Tournament details
- Country: Morocco

Final positions
- Champions: Kawkab Marrakech

The 1986–87 season of the Moroccan Throne Cup was the 31st edition of the competition.

Kawkab Marrakech won the cup, beating Renaissance de Berkane 4–0 in the final, played at the Stade Mohamed V in Casablanca. Kawkab Marrakech won the competition for the fourth time in their history.

== Tournament ==
=== Last 16 ===
Team 1	Team 2	Result
Union de Touarga	Mouloudia Club d'Oujda	1–2
Rachad Bernoussi	Renaissance de Berkane	2–3
Hilal de Nador	Union de Sidi Kacem	3–4
US Musulmane d'Oujda	Fath Union Sport	3–1
ASFA	FAR de Rabat	0–2
Chabab Mohammédia	Raja de Beni Mellal	3–0
Renaissance de Settat	AS Salé	1–0
Kawkab Marrakech	Hassania d'Agadir	3–0

=== Quarter-finals ===
Team 1	Team 2	Result
US Musulmane d'Oujda	Union de Sidi Kacem	1–0
Chabab Mohammédia	FAR de Rabat	0–1
Renaissance de Settat	Renaissance de Berkane	0–3
Kawkab Marrakech	Mouloudia Club d'Oujda	1–0

=== Semi-finals ===
Team 1	Team 2	Result
US Musulmane d'Oujda	Renaissance de Berkane	1–2
Kawkab Marrakech	FAR de Rabat	0–0; 8–7 (pens)

=== Final ===
The final featured the two winning semi-finalists, Kawkab Marrakech and Renaissance de Berkane, on 7 September 1987 at the Stade Mohamed V in Casablanca.

1986–87 Moroccan Throne Cup
7 September 1987
Final

Kawkab Marrakech	4–0	Renaissance de Berkane
	Report

Stade Mohamed V, Casablanca
Referee: Hassan Najachi
