= 2025–26 Botola Pro =

Moroccan football league season

Botola Pro
- Season: 2025–26
- Dates: 25 September 2025 – 5 July 2026; 17–21 July 2026 (Play-off)
- Champions: Maghreb Fez (5th title)
- Relegated: Olympic Dcheira (via play-offs); US Yacoub Mansour; Olympic Safi
- CAF Champions League: Maghreb Fez; RS Berkane
- CAF Confederation Cup: Raja CA; AS FAR
- Top goalscorer: Soufiane Benjdida (20 Goals)
- Biggest home win: Maghreb Fez 4–0 Olympic Safi (2 Nov 2025); Maghreb Fez 4–0 Hassania Agadir (29 Apr 2025)
- Biggest away win: Olympic Dcheira 0–5 Wydad AC (21 Feb 2026)
- Highest scoring: UTS Rabat 3–4 Wydad AC (8 Mar 2026); RS Berkane 4-3 UTS Rabat (7 May 2026); RCA Zemamra 3-4 Raja CA (17 June 2026)
- Longest winning run: RS Berkane (5 games)
- Longest unbeaten run: AS FAR (28 games)
- Longest winless run: UTS Rabat (16 games)
- Longest losing run: Wydad AC (7 games)
- All statistics correct as of 5 July 2026.

The 2025–26 Botola Pro, also known as Botola Pro Inwi for sponsorship reasons, was the 69th season of the Botola Pro, the highest tier football league of Morocco. Competition started on the 25th of September 2025.

RS Berkane were the defending champions, having won their maiden title in the previous season.

This season was marked by organizational issues regarding the match calendar, causing the end of the regular season to only happen on the 5th of July 2026, even with the 2026 FIFA World Cup happening at the same time.

Maghreb Fez were crowned champions on the 5th of July 2026, clinching their 5th league title by defeating Olympic Dcheira 2-0. This triumph ends a 41-year title drought, with their previous title dating back to the 1984-85 season.

== Teams ==
A total of 16 teams contest the league, including 13 sides from the 2024–25 season and 3 promoted teams from 2024–25 Botola Pro 2.

The following teams changed division in the previous season:

▲ Promoted from 2024–25 Botola Pro 2	▼ Relegated from 2024–25 Botola Pro
Kawkab Marrakech (after 8 years); US Yacoub El Mansour (First time); Olympic Dcheira (via play-offs, first time)	JS Soualem (via play-offs, after 4 years); Moghreb Tetouan (after 3 years); SCC Mohammedia (after 5 years)

=== Stadium and locations ===
Locations of the 2025–26 Botola teams

Team name	Acronym	Location	Stadium	Capacity
AS FAR	ASFAR	Rabat	Prince Moulay Abdellah Stadium	69,000
COD Meknès	CODM	Meknès	Honneur Stadium	20,000
DH Jadida	DHJ	El Jadida	Ben M'Hamed El Abdi Stadium	10,000
FUS Rabat	FUS	Rabat	Moulay Hassan Stadium	22,000
HUS Agadir	HUSA	Agadir	Adrar Stadium	45,480
IR Tanger	IRT	Tangier	Ibn Batouta Stadium	75,000
MAS Fez	MAS	Fez	Fez Stadium	45,000
KAC Marrakech	KACM	Marrakesh	Marrakesh Stadium	45,240
OC Safi	OCS	Safi	El Massira Stadium	10,000
Olympique Dcheira	OD	Dcheira El Jihadia	Adrar Stadium	45,480
Raja CA	RCA	Casablanca	Mohammed V Stadium	45,891
RCA Zemamra	RCAZ	Zemamra	Ahmed Choukri Stadium	2,500
RS Berkane	RSB	Berkane	Berkane Municipal Stadium	15,000
US Yacoub El Mansour	USYM	Rabat	Rabat Olympic Stadium	21,000
UTS Rabat	UTS	Rabat	Al Medina Stadium	18,000
Wydad AC	WAC	Casablanca	Mohammed V Stadium	45,891

=== Personnel and kits ===
Team	Head coach	Captain	Kit manufacturer	Shirt sponsors (front)
AS FAR	(Portugal) Alexandre Santos	(Morocco) Mohamed Rabie Hrimat	(Germany) Uhlsport	
COD Meknès	(Morocco) Mohamed Aziz (Caretaker)	(Morocco) Adnane Berdad	(Morocco) AB Sport	Biougnach, InterPub^{1}, Dante^{2}
DH El Jadidi	(Portugal) Rui Almeida	(Morocco) Marouane Lemzaouri	(Germany) Jako	TGCC, Mazagan
FUS Rabat	(Morocco) Saïd Chiba	(Morocco) Mouad Bahsain	(Germany) Uhlsport	Novec, Cosumar, LafargeHolcim Maroc^{1}
HUS Agadir	(Morocco) Hilal Et-Tair	(Morocco) Badreddine Abyir	(Italy) Macron	Afriquia, Moov'up^{2}
IR Tanger	(Algeria) Abdelhak Benchikha	(Morocco) Mohamed Saoud	(Spain) Joma	Tanger-Med
KAC Marrakech	(Morocco) Hicham Dmiai	(Morocco) Mohamed Jemjami	(Morocco) AB Sport	Visit Marrakech, Pickalbatros
MAS Fez	(Spain) Pablo Franco	(Morocco) Salaheddine Chihab	(Germany) Uhlsport	TGCC, Daiko^{1}, Ingelec^{1}, VitrA^{3}
OC Safi	(Morocco) Mounir Jaouani	(Mali) Abdoulaye Diarra	(Morocco) Bang Sports	
Olympique Dcheira	(Morocco) Bouchaib El Moubarki	(Morocco) Ayoub Benaadi	(Morocco) Bang Sports	Afriquia Gaz, Atay Diwan^{1}, Continental^{1}, Vivalu^{2}
Raja CA	(Tunisia) Nasreddine Nabi	(Morocco) Badr Benoun	(England) Umbro	Changan, Kayna, Sofac^{3}, Nor'Dar, Marsa Maroc^{1}, Pare-Brise Express^{2}^{3}
RCA Zemamra	(Morocco) Mehdi Mrani Alaoui	(Morocco) Zakaria Bahrou	(Morocco) Bang Sports	IGASERG, BH Medical Groupe
RS Berkane	(Tunisia) Mouin Chaâbani	(Morocco) Munir Mohamedi	(Morocco) Bang Sports	Thé Dahmiss, Viva^{1}, National Gaz^{1}
UTS Rabat	(Morocco) Mimoun Mokhtari	(Morocco) Redouan Ait Lamkadem	(Italy) Macron	
US Yacoub El Mansour	(Morocco) Mehdi El Jabri	(Morocco) Jalal-Eddine El Khfiyef	(Morocco) Avanchi	CAT+, Smalter^{1}, Guichet^{2}
Wydad AC	(Morocco) Adil Hermach (Caretaker)	(Morocco) Nordin Amrabat	(Italy) Kappa	Ingelec, Or Blanc^{1}

1. On the back of shirt.
2. On the sleeves.
3. On the shorts.
Additionally, referee kits are made by Puma.

== Managerial changes ==
Teams	Outgoing manager	Manner of departure	Date of vacancy	Position in table	Incoming manager	Date of appointment
HUS Agadir	(Morocco) Abdelhadi Sektioui	End of contract	5 June 2025	Pre-season	(Comoros) Amir Abdou	5 June 2025
Raja CA	(Tunisia) Lassaad Chabbi	Mutual consent	22 September 2025	5th	(South Africa) Fadlu Davids	22 September 2025
KAC Marrakech	(Morocco) Rachid Taoussi	Sacked	30 September 2025	16th	(Morocco) Hicham Dmiai	3 October 2025
OC Safi	(Morocco) Amine El Karma	Sacked	4 October 2025	8th	(Morocco) Taoufik Simmou (Caretaker)	4 October 2025
RCA Zemamra	(Morocco) Redouane El Haimeur	Sacked	10 October 2025	15th	(Morocco) Mehdi Mrani Alaoui (Caretaker)	14 October 2025
OC Safi	(Morocco) Taoufik Simmou (Caretaker)		31 October 2025	9th	(Morocco) Zakaria Aboub	3 November 2025
IR Tanger	(Morocco) Hilal Et-Tair	Sacked	18 November 2025	9th	(Spain) Pepe Mel	2 December 2025
RCA Zemamra	(Morocco) Mehdi Mrani Alaoui (Caretaker)		1 January 2026	10th	(Morocco) Mohamed Fakhir	1 January 2026
OC Safi	(Morocco) Zakaria Aboub	Sacked	21 February 2026	16th	(Tunisia) Chokri Khatoui	24 February 2026
RCA Zemamra	(Morocco) Mohamed Fakhir	Sacked	25 February 2026	13th	(Morocco) Mehdi Mrani Alaoui	25 February 2026
HUS Agadir	(Comoros) Amir Abdou	Signed by Burkina Faso	1 March 2026	9th	(Morocco) Hilal Et-Tair	10 March 2026
IR Tanger	(Spain) Pepe Mel	Contract Terminated	10 March 2026	12th	(Algeria) Abdelhak Benchikha	11 March 2026
UTS Rabat	(Morocco) Abdelouahed Zamrat	Sacked	13 March 2026	14th	(Morocco) Mimoun Mokhtari	13 March 2026
Wydad AC	(Morocco) Mohamed Amine Benhachem	Mutual consent	24 March 2026	2nd	(France) Patrice Carteron	25 March 2026
Olympique Dcheira	(Morocco) Abderrahim Essaidi	Sacked	31 March 2026	10th	(Morocco) Mourad Erraji	1 April 2026
Wydad AC	(France) Patrice Carteron	Sacked	30 April 2026	4th	(Morocco) Mohammed Benchrifa	1 May 2026
Olympique Dcheira	(Morocco) Mourad Erraji		14 May 2026	13th	(Morocco) Bouchaib El Moubarki	20 May 2026
COD Meknes	(Morocco) Abdelaziz Dnibi	Sacked	25 May 2026	8th	(Morocco) Mohamed Aziz (Caretaker)	25 May 2026
OC Safi	(Tunisia) Chokri Khatoui	Sacked	2 June 2026	16th	(Morocco) Mounir Jaouani	4 June 2026
Raja CA	(South Africa) Fadlu Davids	Sacked	11 June 2026	5th	(Tunisia) Nasreddine Nabi	12 June 2026
Wydad AC	(Morocco) Mohammed Benchrifa	Sacked	22 June 2026	5th	(Morocco) Adil Hermach (Caretaker)	25 June 2026

== League table ==
Pos	Team	Pld	W	D	L	GF	GA	GD	Pts	Qualification or relegation
1	Maghreb Fez (C)	30	16	11	3	40	17	+23	59	Qualification for Champions League
2	RS Berkane	30	16	9	5	44	27	+17	57	Qualification for Champions League
3	Raja CA	30	16	8	6	39	19	+20	56	Qualification for Confederation Cup (Note: Since the 2024-25 Throne Cup was postponed until the following season, it's spot in the CAF Confederation Cup was given to the 4th placed team.)
4	AS FAR	30	13	16	1	45	22	+23	55	Qualification for Confederation Cup
5	Wydad AC	30	13	4	13	39	33	+6	43	
6	DH El Jadida	30	9	13	8	30	34	−4	40	
7	Ittihad Tanger	30	9	12	9	27	31	−4	39	
8	FUS Rabat	30	9	10	11	31	36	−5	37	
9	Kawkab Marrakech	30	8	12	10	27	26	+1	36 (Note: Head-to-head Goal Difference: KACM +2, CODM -2)	
10	COD Meknes	30	9	9	12	24	33	−9	36	
11	RCA Zemamra	30	8	9	13	28	37	−9	33 (Note: Tied on head-to-head Goal Difference and number of wins. RCAZ was ranked ahead for having scored more goals.)	
12	Hassania Agadir	30	8	9	13	27	39	−12	33	
13	UTS Rabat (O)	30	6	13	11	32	40	−8	31	Qualification to relegation play-offs
14	Olympic Dcheira (R)	30	7	9	14	29	40	−11	30 (Note: Head-to-head Goal Difference: OD +1, USYM -1)	Qualification to relegation play-offs
15	US Yacoub Mansour (R)	30	7	9	14	34	44	−10	30	Relegation to Botola Pro 2
16	Olympic Safi (R)	30	3	13	14	24	42	−18	22	Relegation to Botola Pro 2

Updated to match(es) played on 21 July 2026. Source: FRMF
Rules for classification: 1) Points; 2a) Head-to-head goal difference if they are two teams with equal points; 2b) Goal difference if they are more than two teams with equal points; 3) Number of wins; 4) Goals scored; 5) Play-off between involved teams if necessary.
Source: FRMF Competitions ruleset: Article 54.2
(C) Champions; (O) Play-off winners; (R) Relegated

== Results ==
Home \ Away	ASFAR	CODM	DHJ	FUS	HUSA	IRT	KACM	MAS	OCS	OD	RCA	RCAZ	RSB	USYM	UTS	WAC
AS FAR	—	3–0	2–1	1–0	3–0	1–1	2–0	0–0	1–1	3–2	2–1	0–0	0–0	2–0	2–2	2–1
COD Meknes	3–2	—	0–1	2–0	0–0	1–0	1–0	0–0	1–0	2–1	1–0	1–2	0–1	1–0	1–1	1–3
DH El Jadida	0–4	0–0	—	1–0	2–2	2–2	1–1	0–0	1–1	2–2	0–2	2–1	1–3	2–1	1–0	1–0
FUS Rabat	1–1	1–0	0–0	—	1–2	1–1	1–1	1–1	2–1	0–2	0–2	3–2	2–1		1–1	1–0
Hassania Agadir	2–3	0–0	2–1	0–0	—	1–1	1–1	0–2	2–1	0–3	0–1	1–1	1–0	2–0	1–0	1–2
Ittihad Tanger	0–0	2–1	1–1	0–3	1–1	—	0–0	1–1	1–1	1–2	1–1	1–0	1–0	2–1	1–1	2–1
Kawkab Marrakech	0–0	3–1	0–0	2–0	2–1	0–2	—	0–0	1–1	2–1	2–0	1–2	1–2	2–1	3–0	0–0
Maghreb Fez	0–0	0–0	2–1	4–2	4–0	0–1	1–1	—	4–0	2–0	0–2	2–0	1–2	2–1	1–0	1–0
Olympic Safi	0–3	2–2	1–2	1–1	1–0	0–2	1–0	1–2	—	0–0	0–2	1–3	1–1	0–1	1–1	1–2
Olympic Dcheira	1–1	1–1	0–1	1–1	0–1	2–0	2–1	0–2	1–1	—	0–1	0–1	0–4	1–1	1–2	0–5
Raja CA	0–0	2–1	1–0	4–1	2–0	2–0	1–0	1–1	2–0	1–0	—	3–0	0–1	0–0	1–1	0–1
RCA Zemamra	0–0	1–2	0–0	1–1	0–0	1–0	1–1	1–2	1–1	0–0	3–4	—	1–2	2–1	0–1	1–0
RS Berkane	2–2	2–0	2–1	1–0	2–1	1–0	0–1	1–1	0–0	2–1	1–1	1–0	—	3–3	4–3	2–0
US Yacoub El Mansour	2–2	1–1	2–2	1–3	2–1	1–2	2–1	1–2	1–3	0–1	2–1	2–0	1–1	—	1–2	1–1
UTS Rabat	1–1	2–0	1–2	0–2	0–2	1–0	0–0	0–1	1–1	1–1	1–1	1–2	2–2	1–1	—	3–4
Wydad AC	1–2	2–0	1–1	1–2	3–2	2–0	1–0	0–1	1–0	1–3	0–0	3–1	1–0	2–1	1–2	—

Updated to match(es) played on 5 July 2026. Source: FRMF (Overriden by the 26-27 Season) Flashscore
Legend: Blue = home team win; Yellow = draw; Red = away team win.
For upcoming matches, an "a" indicates there is an article about the rivalry between the two participants.

== Promotion/relegation play-offs ==
The teams finishing 14rd and 13th faced off against 3rd and 4th from Botola Pro 2, respectively.

18 July 2026
15:00

US Amal Tiznit	0 - 0	Olympic Dcheira
Koumah (red card) 86'	Report

El Abdi Stadium, El Jadida

21 July 2026
19:00

Olympic Dcheira	1 - 1	US Amal Tiznit
El Khafi 58'	Report	Essalhi 66'

Municipal Stadium, Berrechid

US Amal Tiznit won on Away Goals.

17 July 2026
20:00

JS Massira	1 - 1	UTS Rabat
El Filal 9' (P)	Report	Arjoune 65'

El Bachir Stadium, Mohammedia

21 July 2026
19:00

UTS Rabat	3 - 0	JS Massira
Walid Rhailouf 85'; Omar Arjoune 90'; Mohamed Fouzair 90+6'	Report

Al Medina Stadium, Rabat

UTS Rabat won 4-1 on Aggregate.

== See also ==
- 2025–26 Botola Pro 2
- 2025–26 CAF Champions League
- 2025–26 CAF Confederation Cup
