= 1957–58 Moroccan Throne Cup =

Tournament details
- Country: Morocco
- Dates: 1957–58

Final positions
- Champions: Mouloudia Club d'Oujda (2nd title)
- Runner-up: Wydad Athletic Club

The 1957–58 season of the Moroccan Throne Cup was the second edition of the competition.

The teams played one-legged matched. In case of a draw, the matches were to be replayed at the home of the other team.

Mouloudia Club d'Oujda won the cup, beating Wydad Athletic Club 2–1 in the final, played at Stade d'honneur in Casablanca. Mouloudia Club d'Oujda won the cup for the second time, beating the same team in the final.

== Tournament ==
The final took place between the winners of the two semi-finals, Mouloudia Club d'Oujda and Wydad Athletic Club, on 16 November 1957 at the Stade d'honneur in Casablanca. The match was refereed by "Corcoles". MC Oujda beat Wydad AC for the second consecutive time in the final, after a draw in the previous year led to Oujda being awarded the title after scoring first.

Mouloudia Club d'Oujda beat Wydad AC in the final for the second time. However, it was the Casablancans who opened the scoring through Mohamed Khalfi ( 7'), but the Oujdis soon equalised through Jebbari ( 13'). With the match level, it was MCO who took advantage through a goal by Chellal ( 84'), which won them the title. It was their second consecutive victory against MC Oujda in the competition.

== Sources ==
- Rsssf.com
