= 1989–90 Moroccan Throne Cup =

1989–9 Moroccan Throne Cup
Tournament details
- Country: Morocco

Final positions
- Champions: Olympique de Casablanca

The 1989–90 season of the Moroccan Throne Cup was the 34th edition of the competition.

Olympique de Casablanca won the cup, beating FAR de Rabat 4–2 on penalties after a 0–0 draw in the final, played at the Prince Moulay Abdellah Stadium in Rabat. Olympique de Casablanca won the competition for the first time in their history.

== Competition ==
=== Last 16 ===
Team 1	Team 2	Result
Najah Souss	Difaâ Hassani El Jadidi	0–2
Union de Sidi Kacem	Amal Club de Belksiri	2–0
Raja Club Athletic	Fath Union Sport	1–0
Maghreb de Fès	Ittihad Khemisset	1–2
FAR Rabat	Chabab Mohammédia	3–0
Olympique de Khouribga	Renaissance de Settat	2–1
KAC Kénitra	Tihad Sportif Casablanca	4–1
Olympique de Casablanca	AS Salé	1–0

=== Quarter-finals ===
Team 1	Team 2	Result
Union de Sidi Kacem	Difaâ Hassani El Jadidi	1–0
Raja Club Athletic	FAR de Rabat	0–4
KAC Kénitra	Olympique de Khouribga	0–1
Olympique de Casablanca	Ittihad Khemisset	3–1

=== Semi-finals ===
Team 1	Team 2	Result
Olympique de Casablanca	Olympique de Khouribga	0–0; 5–3 (pens)
Union de Sidi Kacem	FAR de Rabat	0–4

=== Final ===
The final took place between the two winning semi-finalists, Olympique de Casablanca and FAR de Rabat, on 18 September 1990 at the Prince Moulay Abdellah Stadium in Rabat.

1989–90 Moroccan Throne Cup
18 September 1990
Final

Olympique de Casablanca	0–0	FAR de Rabat
Penalties
	4-2

Prince Moulay Abdellah Stadium, Rabat
Referee: Hassan Chafai
