= 1956–57 Moroccan Throne Cup =

Tournament details
- Country: Morocco
- Dates: 1956–1957

Final positions
- Champions: Mouloudia Club d'Oujda (1st title)
- Runners-up: Wydad Athletic Club

The 1956 – 57 season of the Moroccan Throne Cup was the first edition of the competition.

The teams played one-legged matches. In case of a draw, a penalty shoot-out took place.

Mouloudia Club d'Oujda beat Wydad Athletic Club in the final, after a draw (1 – 1). The Royal Moroccan Football Federation decided that the team that scored first would win the title. The final took place at Stade Marcel Cerdan in Casablanca.

The final took place between the winners of the two semi-finals, Mouloudia Club d'Oujda and Wydad Athletic Club, on 16 November 1957 at the Stade Marcel Cerdan in Casablanca, with 30,000 spectators. MC Oujda opened the scoring through Français Braizat ( 42'). Wydad equalised in the second half through a penalty from the Frenchman Patrice Mayet 60' (pen.). The match was refereed by Boubker Lazrak. The teams were as follows:

- MCO : Assaban, Restoy, Belkheir, Boutaleb, Larabi, Kaouachi, Madani, Sabi, Belaïd, Braizat, Charef.
- WAC : Benjilali, Messaoud, Tibari, Lahbib, Kadmiri, Mustapha 1, Bel Hassan, Azhar, Mustapha 2, Gomez, Mayet.

Mouloudia Club d'Oujda won the title at the expense of Wydad AC, despite the score finishing as a draw (1 – 1), as the Royal Moroccan Football Federation had decided that the team to score first would win the title. King Mohammed V of Morocco and the former President of Wydad Athletic Club, Mohamed Benjelloun Touimi, were present at the final and presented the cup to the winners, MC Oujda.

== Sources ==
- Rsssf.com
