= 1992–93 Moroccan Throne Cup =

Tournament details
- Country: Morocco

Final positions
- Champions: Kawkab Marrakech

The 1992–93 season of the Moroccan Throne Cup was the 37th edition of the competition.

Kawkab Marrakech won the cup, beating Maghreb de Fès 1–0 in the final, played at the Prince Moulay Abdellah Stadium in Rabat. Kawkab Marrakech won the competition for the sixth time in their history.

== Competition ==
=== Last 16 ===
Team 1	Team 2	Result
Kawkab Marrakech	Najm Riadi Marrakech	3 - 2
Raja de Beni Mellal	Maghreb de Fès	0 - 1
Difaâ Hassani El Jadidi	Union de Sidi Kacem	1 - 0
Olympique de Casablanca	Raja Club Athletic	0 - 1
Raja d'Agadir	Ittihad Tanger	2 - 0
USP Police	Ittihad Fès	1 - 0
Wydad Athletic Club	Fath Union Sport	3 - 1
Olympique de Khouribga	FAR de Rabat	1 - 0

=== Quarter finals ===
Team 1	Team 2	Result
Kawkab Marrakech	Difaâ Hassani El Jadidi	2 - 0
Wydad Athletic Club	Raja Club Athletic	1 - 2
USP Police	Olympique de Khouribga	0 - 2
Ittihad Tanger	Maghreb de Fès	0 - 1

=== Semi-finals ===
Team 1	Team 2	Result
Kawkab Marrakech	Raja Club Athletic	3 - 1
Maghreb de Fès	Olympique de Khouribga	2 - 2; 4 - 2 (pens)

=== Final ===
The final took place between the two winning semi-finalists, Kawkab Marrakech and KAC Kénitra, on 16 December 1993 at the Prince Moulay Abdellah Stadium in Rabat.

1992–93 Moroccan Throne Cup Final
16 December 1993

Kawkab Marrakech	1–0	Maghreb de Fès
	Report

Prince Moulay Abdellah Stadium, Rabat
Referee: Miloud Bouchikhi
