= 1977–78 Moroccan Throne Cup =

1977–78 1977–78 Moroccan Throne Cup
Tournament details
- Country: Morocco

Final positions
- Champions: Wydad Athletic Club

The 1977–78 season of the Moroccan Throne Cup was the 22nd edition of the competition.

Wydad Athletic Club won the cup, beating Renaissance de Kénitra 3–0 in the final, played at the Stade Saniat Rmel in Tetouan. Wydad Athletic Club won the competition for the second time in their history.

== Competition ==
=== Last 16 ===
Team 1	Team 2	Result
Crédit agricole Rabat	AS Salé	1–2
Chabab Mohammédia	Amal Club de Belksiri	5–2
Union de Mohammédia	Difaâ Hassani El Jadidi	1–2
Wydad Athletic Club	TAS de Casablanca	1–0
Renaissance de Kénitra	Renaissance de Settat	2–1
Fath Union Sport	Maghreb de Fès	0–1
Amal Belksiri	Difaâ Hassani El Jadidi	1–2
Wydad de Fès	Raja d'Agadir	1–0

=== Quarter-finals ===
Team 1	Team 2	Result
Chabab Mohammédia	Raja d'Agadir	1–0
AS Salé	Difaâ Hassani El Jadidi	1–2
Renaissance de Kénitra	FAR de Rabat	3–1
Wydad Athletic Club	Maghreb de Fès	2–0

=== Semi-finals ===
Team 1	Team 2	Result
Wydad Athletic Club	Difaâ Hassani El Jadidi	2–1
Renaissance de Kénitra	Chabab Mohammédia	1–0

=== Final ===
The final took place between the winners of the two semi-finals, Wydad Athletic Club and Renaissance de Kénitra, on 16 July 1978 at Stade Saniat Rmel in Tanger.

Moroccan Throne Cup Final 1978
16 July 1978

Wydad Athletic Club	3–0	Renaissance de Kénitra

Stade Saniat Rmel, Tetouan
Referee: Mohamed Bahou
