= 1993–94 Moroccan Throne Cup =

Tournament details
- Country: Morocco

Final positions
- Champions: Wydad Athletic Club

The 1993–94 season of the Moroccan Throne Cup was the 38th edition of the competition.

Wydad Athletic Club won the cup, beating Olympique de Khouribga 1–0 in the final, played at the Stade Mohamed V in Casablanca. Wydad Athletic Club won the competition for the 6th time in their history.

== Competition ==
=== Last 16 ===
Team 1	Team 2	Result
Wydad Athletic Club	USP Police	2–1
Maghreb de Fès	Racing de Casablanca	4–1
Olympique de Khouribga	CSE	3–0
Renaissance de Settat	ASFA	1–0
Kawkab Marrakech	Difaâ Hassani El Jadidi	1–1; 4–3
Mouloudia Club d'Oujda	Wydad de Fès	1–0
Olympique de Casablanca	Union Yacoub El Mansour	2–1
Fath Union Sport	FAR de Rabat	1–2

=== Quarter-finals ===
Team 1	Team 2	Result
Renaissance de Settat	Olympique de Khouribga	0–1
Wydad Athletic Club	Maghreb de Fès	2–1
FAR de Rabat	Mouloudia Club d'Oujda	2–0
Kawkab Marrakech	Olympique de Casablanca	2–1

=== Semi-finals ===
Team 1	Team 2	Result
Wydad Athletic Club	FAR de Rabat	1-0
Kawkab Marrakech	Olympique de Khouribga	0–3

=== Final ===
The final took place between the two winning semi-finalists, Wydad Athletic Club and Olympique de Khouribga, on 29 September 1994 at the Stade Mohamed V in Casablanca.

1993–94 Moroccan Throne Cup Final
29 September 1994

Wydad Athletic Club	1–0	Olympique de Khouribga
	Report

Stade Mohamed V, Casablanca
Referee: Yahya Hadqa
