= 1962–63 Moroccan Throne Cup =

Tournament details
- Country: Morocco

Final positions
- Champions: Kawkab Marrakech (1st title)
- Runners-up: Hassania Agadir

The 1962–63 season of the Moroccan Throne Cup was the 7th edition of the competition.

The teams played one-legged matches. In case of a draw, there was either a penalty shoot-out, or a replay at the opponents' ground.

Kawkab Marrakech beat Hassania Agadir 3–2 in the final, played at the Stade d'honneur in Casablanca. Kawkab Marrakech won the title for the first time in their history.

== Tournament ==
The final took place between the two winners of the semi-finals, Kawkab Marrakech and Hassania Agadir, on 9 June 1963 at the Stade d'honneur in Casablanca. The match was refereed by Mohamed Bellefkih. KAC Marrakech faced their southern neighbours, Hassania Agadir. It was the first final for Hassania Agadir, and the second for KAC Marrakech. The match featured a notable comeback. Hassania Agadir opened the scoring through Lahcen Chicha ( 10'), followed by a goal from Hama ( 17)'. KAC Marrakech came back with a goal before half-time through Moulay Lahcen Zidane ( 40'). After a tight second half, the players from Marrakech scored an equaliser through Abdelkrim Zaidani, known as Krimou, at the very end of the match, in stoppage time ( 97'). When extra time was played, the golden goal rule was used. Krimou scored a golden goal ( 119'), to give KAC Marrakech their first title in the competition.

== Sources ==
- Rsssf.com
