= 1983–84 Moroccan Throne Cup =

Tournament details
- Country: Morocco

Final positions
- Champions: FAR de Rabat

The 1983–84 season of the Moroccan Throne Cup was the 28th edition of the competition.

FAR de Rabat won the cup, beating Renaissance de Kénitra 1–0 in the final, played at the stade Mohamed V in Casablanca. FAR de Rabat won the cup for the third time in their history.

== Tournament ==
=== Last 16 ===
Team 1	Team 2	Result
Union de Mohammédia	Raja Club Athletic	0–1
Difaâ Hassani El Jadidi	Renaissance de Berkane	1–0
Rapide Oued Zem	Youssoufia Berrechid	1–0
Maghreb de Fès	Difaâ Aïn Sebaâ	0–1
CODM Meknès	Amal Club de Belksiri	1–0
Ittihad de Tanger	Renaissance de Kénitra	0–3
AS Salé	Fath Union Sport	0–2
FAR de Rabat	KAC Kénitra	3–1

=== Quarter-finals ===
Team 1	Team 2	Result
Difaâ Hassani El Jadidi	Renaissance de Kénitra	0–1
Raja Club Athletic	Rapide Oued Zem	1–2
Difaâ Aïn Sebaâ	CODM Meknès	0–0; 4–3 (pens)
FAR de Rabat	Fath Union Sport	1–0

=== Semi-finals ===
Team 1	Team 2	Result
FAR de Rabat	Difaâ Aïn Sebaâ	3–1
Rapide Oued Zem	Renaissance de Kénitra	4–5

=== Final ===
The final took place between the two winning semi-finalists, FAR de Rabat and Renaissance de Kénitra, on 8 July 1984 at the Stade Mohamed V in Casablanca.

1983–84 Moroccan Throne Cup
8 July 1984
Final

FAR de Rabat	1–0	Renaissance de Kénitra
	Report

Stade Mohamed V, Casablanca
Referee: Abdelali Naciri
