= 1984–85 Moroccan Throne Cup =

Tournament details
- Country: Morocco

Final positions
- Champions: FAR de Rabat

The 1984–85 season of the Moroccan Throne Cup was the 29th edition of the competition.

FAR de Rabat won the competition, beating Difaâ Hassani El Jadidi 3–0 in the final, played at the Prince Moulay Abdellah Stadium in Rabat. FAR de Rabat won the cup for the fourth time in their history.

== Tournament ==
=== Last 16 ===
Team 1	Team 2	Result
FAR de Rabat	Wydad de Fès	2–0
Difaâ Hassani El Jadidi	Fath Union Sport	1–0
Sidi Yahya Gharb	Renaissance de Kénitra	0–1
Hassania d'Agadir	Mouloudia Club d'Oujda	0–1
Maghreb de Fès	Raja de Beni Mellal	4–0
Renaissance de Settat	Wydad Athletic Club	2–0
Kawkab Marrakech	Raja Club Athletic	1–0
KAC Kénitra	AS Salé	0–1

=== Quarter-finals ===
Team 1	Team 2	Result
FAR de Rabat	Renaissance de Kénitra	3–0
Maghreb de Fès	Mouloudia Club d'Oujda	1–0
Kawkab Marrakech	Difaâ Hassani El Jadidi	0–1
Renaissance de Settat	AS Salé	1–0

=== Semi-finals ===
Team 1	Team 2	Result
FAR de Rabat	Maghreb de Fès	2–1
Renaissance de Settat	Difaâ Hassani El Jadidi	0–1

=== Final ===
The final took place between the winners of the two semi-finals, FAR de Rabat and Difaâ Hassani El Jadidi, on 16 January 1986 at the Prince Moulay Abdellah Stadium in Rabat.

1984–85 Moroccan Throne Cup
16 January 1986
Final

FAR de Rabat	3–0	Difaâ Hassani El Jadidi
	Report

Prince Moulay Abdellah Stadium, Rabat
Referee: Mohamed Bahou
