= 1963–64 Moroccan Throne Cup =

Tournament details
- Country: Morocco

Final positions
- Champions: Kawkab Marrakech (2nd title)
- Runners-up: Wydad Athletic Club

The 1963–64 season of the Moroccan Throne Cup was the 8th edition of that football competition.

In case of draws, either a penalty shoot-out or the match would be replayed at the opponents' ground.

Kawkab Marrakech beat Wydad Athletic Club 3–2 in the final, played at the Stade d'honneur in Casablanca. Kawkab Marrakech won the cup for the second time, and the second time in a row.

== Tournament ==
The final took place between the two winning semi-finalists, Kawkab Marrakech and Wydad Athletic Club, on 28 June 1964 at the Stade d'honneur in Casablanca. The match was refereed by Salih Mohamed Boukkili. It was the fourth final for Wydad AC, who had never won the competition, and the third for KAC Marrakech, who were in their third final, and second consecutive. The club had won their first title the previous season. KAC Marrakech scored the first couple of goals, thanks to Abdelkrim Zaidani, known as Krimou ( 35'), and an og from Lahcen ( 54' (o.g.)). Wydad responded with a goal from Bouzidi ( 56'), and an equaliser from Mohamed Khalfi ( 66'). However, the Casablancan comeback was in vain, thanks to KAC Marrakech scoring a final goal through Khaldi ( 87'). It was the second consecutive win for Kawkab Marrakech in the competition, and the fourth defeat for Wydad, who were yet to win a title.

== Sources ==
- Rsssf.com
