= 1990–91 Moroccan Division Nationale I =

Moroccan football league season

Division Nationale I
- Season: 1990–91
- Champions: Wydad Casablanca (9th title)

The 1990–91 Division Nationale I is the 35th season of the Moroccan Premier League. Wydad Casablanca are the holders of the title.
