= 1994–95 Moroccan Throne Cup =

Tournament details
- Country: Morocco

Final positions
- Champions: Fath Union Sport

The 1994–95 season of the Moroccan Throne Cup was the 39th edition of the competition.

Fath Union Sport won the cup, beating Olympique de Khouribga 2–0 in the final, played at the Prince Moulay Abdellah Stadium in Rabat. Fath Union Sport won the competition for the fourth time in their history.

== Tournament ==
=== Last 16 ===
Team 1	Team 2	Result
CA	USY	1–0
ASFA	Wydad Athletic Club	0–0; 4–2 (pens)
Olympique de Khouribga	KAC Kénitra	1–0
Ittihad Tanger	Moghreb de Tetouan	2–1
Rachad Bernoussi	ASMF	1–1; 4–3
Raja de Beni Mellal	Renaissance de Settat	0–0; 4–3 (pens)
Wydad de Fès	Chabab Mohammédia	1–0
Fath Union Sport	Raja de Casablanca	5–1

=== Quarter-finals ===
Team 1	Team 2	Result
Fath Union Sport	Rachad Bernoussi	2–1
Olympique de Khouribga	Wydad de Fès	1–0
Ittihad Tanger	ASFA	2–1
Raja de Beni Mellal	CA	2–0

=== Semi-finals ===
Team 1	Team 2	Result
Fath Union Sport	Raja de Beni Mellal	2–1
Ittihad Tanger	Olympique de Khouribga	0–1

=== Final ===
The final took place between the two winning semi-finalists, Fath Union Sport and Olympique de Khouribga, on 18 July 1995 at the Prince Moulay Abdellah Stadium in Rabat.

1994–95 Moroccan Throne Cup Final
18 July 1995

Fath Union Sport	2–0	Olympique de Khouribga
	Report

Prince Moulay Abdellah Stadium, Rabat
Referee: Mohamed Bahar
