= RS Berkane =

Association football club in Morocco

- Full name: Renaissance Sportive de Berkane النهضة الرياضية البركانية
- Nickname: The Orange Boys
- Founded: 21 May 1938; 88 years ago
- Ground: Berkane Municipal Stadium
- Capacity: 15000
- President: Hakim Benabdellah
- Coach: Bubista
- League: Botola Pro
- 2025–26: Botola Pro, 2nd of 16
- Website: rsb-football.com
Home colours	Away colours	Third colours

Renaissance Sportive de Berkane (Arabic: نادي النهضة البركانية), commonly referred to as RS Berkane, is a Moroccan professional football club based in Berkane. It competes in the Botola Pro, the top flight of Moroccan football.

Founded on 21 May 1938 and renamed in 1978, RS Berkane has traditionally worn an orange home kit since its inception. The club is primarily known for its football section. Over time, RS Berkane has become an established participant in Moroccan domestic competitions and continental African tournaments.

In domestic competitions, the club has won the Moroccan league title once and the Moroccan Throne Cup on three occasions. At the continental level, RS Berkane has won four trophies: three CAF Confederation Cup titles and one CAF Super Cup. The club is among the most successful Moroccan teams of the 21st century and is the third most decorated Moroccan club in African competitions.

== History ==
=== Founding and early years ===
The club was founded in 1938 under the name of Association Sportive de Berkane. In 1953, a team driven by nationalism was created; it was called Union Sportive Musulmane de Berkane (USMB). But this did not last, after a crisis that broke out in 1955.

In 1959–1960, the Union Sportive Musulmane de Berkane was relegated to the 3rd division. In 1962–1963, it contested the play-off match to move up to the 2nd division. The first meeting was between Union Sportive Musulmane de Berkane, against Wydad de Fès. Berkane was promoted to the top division.

In 1966 it was renamed Union Sportive de Berkane and, in the same year, a new club was founded under the name of Chabab Riadhi de Berkane.

In 1971, both teams merged to make Renaissance Sportive de Berkane (Nahdat Berkane). This merger was beneficial for the club; it entered the 1st division in 1977–78.

In 1986, Berkane reached the final for the first time in their history after defeating MC Oujda 2–1 in the semi-final. On 7 September 1987, Berkane lost the 1986 Throne Cup final, after a 4–0 defeat by Kawkab Marrakech.

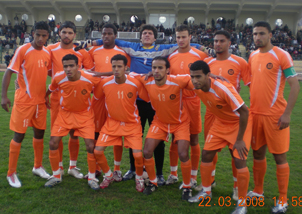
Berkane in 2007

=== Return to the Botola ===
The RSB regained its spot in the first Moroccan division in 2012, under the presidency of Fouzi Lekjaa, who ran the club since 2009.

In 2014, Berkane reached the final for the second time, after a 2–0 victory against Maghreb de Fès. On 18 November, Berkane lost the final after a 2–0 loss against FUS Rabat.

=== First success ===
In 2018, RS Berkane won its first ever title, the Moroccan Throne Cup after defeating Wydad de Fès In penalties.

Berkane have been making steady progress over the years, culminating with their first continental silverware. After their Confederation Cup campaign ended at the quarter-final stage in 2018, they went further in 2019 and lost the final to Zamalek SC. In the semi-final, Berkane defeated CS Sfaxien 3–2 on aggregate, reaching the final of the CAF Confederation Cup for the first time.

In August 2019, after a decade at the helm, Fouzi Lekjaa stepped down as president of RS Berkane, marking the end of an era of transformative leadership. Following his resignation, Hakim Ben Abdellah was appointed as the new president, ushering in a new chapter for the club's administration.

=== Hakim Ben Abdellah era (2019–present) ===
In 2020, Renaissance Sportive De Berkane was crowned Confederation Cup champions, clinching their first continental title in their history. The club beat Egyptians Pyramids 1–0 in the final game at Moulay Abdallah Stadium in Rabat. In the semi-final, Berkane defeated countrymates Hassania Agadir 2–1both scored by Mohamed Aziz.

In the 2022 CAF Confederation Cup, Berkane qualified to the knockout stages after finishing top in the group stages winning three matches, drawing one and losing two. They defeated Al Masry in the Quarter-finals after an away goal ruled in their favor. In the Semi-final, they faced TP Mazembe, which ended in a 4–2 victory on aggregate. On 20 May 2022, Berkane defeated Orlando Pirates F.C. on penalties to win their second African title. With this win, Berkane will play in the first-ever all-Moroccan CAF Super Cup against 2021–22 CAF Champions League winners, Wydad AC. On 28 July 2022, Berkane defeated Wydad in penalties in the 2020–21 Moroccan Throne Cup to win its second domestic title.

On 11 September 2022, Berkane defeated Wydad 2–0 to win its first ever CAF Super Cup. They failed to qualify for the 2023 CAF Confederation Cup. However, following a poor start to the season, Abdelhak Benchikha was sacked in November 2022 after three months officially in charge, with Berkane in 13th place in the table.

On 12 September 2023, Berkane announced the club will contribute MAD 500 thousand to efforts related to the "Al Haouz Earthquake".

In the 2023–24 CAF Confederation Cup, Berkane qualified to the knockout stages after finishing top in the group stages winning four matches and drawing two. They defeated Abu Salim in the Quarter-finals. In the first leg of the semi-final, Berkane was awarded a 3–0 victory after the match was abandoned due to the confiscation of Berkane jerseys by the Algerian security forces at Houari Boumediene Airport in Algiers because of the presence of the Moroccan map along with its disputed Southern Provinces. On 1 May, CAF confirmed the qualification of Berkane to the CAF Confederation Cup final. In the final, they lost the title to Zamalek SC, despite a 2–2 draw, due to the away goal advantage.

The 2024–25 season marked the most successful campaign in Berkane's history, as the club clinched its first-ever Botola title, secured their third CAF Confederation Cup title, and capped off the historic run by reaching the Throne Cup final. However, they were defeated in the final, missing the chance to complete a historic treble. Their league triumph also earned them a place in the CAF Champions League for the first time, where they will compete in the 2025–26 season, and in their debut appearance they impressively reached the semi-finals before being narrowly defeated 2–1 by fellow domestic rivals from the same country.

== Grounds ==
The Stade Municipal de Berkane, located in the city of Berkane in eastern Morocco, has been the home stadium for the team since 2014. With a seating capacity of 10,000 spectators, the stadium underwent significant improvements in 2017 when a natural lawn replaced the synthetic turf that was initially installed. Notably, the stadium gained recognition when it hosted the first leg of the CAF Confederation Cup between RS Berkane and Zamalek SC on 19 May 2019. Today, the venue is not only used for local matches, including the Botola Pro but also for international games, such as the CAF Confederation Cup.

Apart from its seating area, the stadium features several essential facilities, including a foyer, a hall of honor, a doping control room, a nursing room, two clothes warehouses, sanitary facilities, and a meeting room for referees. The playing field is covered with artificial grass that incorporates natural fibers.

== Performance in CAF competitions ==
- CAF Champions league: 1 appearance

2026 – Semi-finals

- CAF Confederation Cup: 9 appearances

2015 – First round
2018 – Quarter-finals
2019 – Runners-up
2020 – Winners
2021 – Group stage
2022 – Winners
2023 – Play-off round
2024 – Runners-up
2025 – Winners

- CAF Super Cup 3 appearances

2021 – Runners-up
2022 – Winners
2025 – Runners-up

== Honours ==
Type	Competition	Titles	Winning seasons	Runners-up
Domestic	Botola Pro	1	2024–25	1982–83, 2025–26
Domestic	Moroccan Throne Cup	3	2018, 2020–21, 2021–22	1986–87, 2013–14, 2024–25
Domestic	Botola Pro 2	1	1976–77	1979–80, 2011–12
Continental	CAF Confederation Cup	3	2019–20, 2021–22, 2024–25	2018–19, 2023–24
Continental	CAF Super Cup	1	2022	2021, 2025

- record

=== Doubles and Trebles ===
- International Trebles
  - Moroccan Throne Cup, CAF Confederation Cup and CAF Super Cup (1): 2022
- International Doubles
  - Botola Pro, CAF Confederation Cup (1): 2025

=== Awards ===
- "UMFP" Moroccan Team of the Year: 2025

== Current squad ==
As of 16 September 2026

Note: Flags indicate national team as defined under FIFA eligibility rules; some limited exceptions apply. Players may hold more than one non-FIFA nationality.

No.	Pos.	Nation	Player
1	GK	MAR	Munir Mohamedi (captain)
3	DF	MAR	Mohamed Aymen Sadil
4	DF	TUN	Oussama Haddadi
5	DF	MAR	Jamal Harkass
6	MF	MAR	Youssef Aït Bennasser
7	MF	MLI	Soumaila Sidibe
8	MF	MAR	Ayoub Khairi
9	FW	MAR	Oussama Lamlioui
10	FW	CPV	Ryan Mendes
11	FW	MAR	Youssef Mehri
12	GK	MAR	Mehdi Miftah
13	DF	MAR	Adil Tahif
14	MF	FRA	Rayane Aabid
15	MF	MAR	Abdelghafour Lamirat

No.	Pos.	Nation	Player
17	MF	MAR	Yassine Labhiri
18	MF	MAR	Mohamed Amine Essahel (on loan from Union Touarga)
19	DF	MAR	Hamza El Moussaoui
20	DF	MAR	Haytam Manaout
22	GK	MAR	Youssef El Motie
23	FW	MAR	Mounir Chouiar
24	FW	MAR	Youness El Kaabi
26	MF	FRA	Omar El Manssouri
27	DF	MAR	Ismaël Kandouss
29	MF	FRA	Zinédine Machach
32	MF	MAR	Mohamed Ouyahia
33	DF	MAR	Et-Tayeb Boukhriss
35	MF	MAR	Reda Hajji

== Coaching staff ==
Position	Staff
Head coach	(Cape Verde) Bubista
Assistant coach	(Cape Verde) Humberto Bettencourt
Goalkeeper coach	(Cape Verde) Bera

== Managers ==
- (Algeria) Djilali Abdi (1991 – 1992)
- (Algeria) Abdelkader Sennour (1996 – 1997)
- (Algeria) Salah Badache (2007 – 2008)
- (France) Bertrand Marchand (16 October 2012 – 17 June 2013)
- (Switzerland) Umberto Barberis (1 July 2013 – 30 October 2013)
- (Morocco) Youssef Lemrini (30 October 2013 – 30 June 2017)
- (Morocco) Mounir Jaouani (1 July 2017 – 2019)
- (Morocco) Tarik Sektioui (2019 – 2021)
- (Morocco) Juan Pedro Benali (2021 – 2021)
- (Democratic Republic of the Congo) Florent Ibengé (July 2021 – 11 September 2022)
- (Algeria) Abdelhak Benchikha (10 August 2022 – 11 November 2022)
- (Morocco) Amine El Karma (11 November 2022 – 11 February 2024)
- (Tunisia) Mouin Chaâbani (12 February 2024 – 17 July 2026)
- (Cape Verde) Bubista (3 August 2026 – present)

== Presidents ==
- (Morocco) Fouzi Lekjaa (2009 – August 2019)
- (Morocco) Hakim Ben Abdellah (August 2019 – present)
