= Tihad Sportif Casablanca =

Moroccan football club

- Full name: Tihad Sportif Casablanca
- Founded: 1936
- Dissolved: 2003 (merged with FUS Rabat)
Home colours	Away colours

Tihad Sportif Casablanca was a Moroccan football club that was founded in 1936 and disbanded in 2003 following the merger with FUS Rabat. The club still survive in other sports sections, notably including basketball and volleyball.
