= AS Salé (football) =

Moroccan football club

- Full name: Association Sportive de Salé de Football
- Nickname: Pirates of Salé
- Founded: 1928
- Stadium: Boubker Ammar Stadium
- President: Karim Ouaabi
- Manager: Mohamed Moujamir
- League: Amateur Division One (D4)

Association Sportive de Salé, commonly known as AS Salé or ASS, is a Moroccan football club based in Salé. The club was founded in 1928 and has won four Moroccan second division titles.

The club played in the top flight during the 1970s and again between 2003 and 2014, finishing third in the 2003–04 season and taking part in the Arab Club Champions Cup in 2004. Following successive relegations in 2024 and 2025, it currently plays in Amateur Division One, the fourth tier of Moroccan football.

== History ==
=== Football in Salé under the French protectorate ===
Several clubs were active in Salé during the colonial period, including Club Athlétique Militaire de Salé, authorised in November 1916, Club Sportif de Salé, recorded in 1928, Union Sportive Musulmane de Rabat-Salé, Étoile Sportive de Salé, recorded in 1935, and Jeunesse Sportive Musulmane de Salé, recorded in 1936.

=== Origins and foundation ===
The foundation of the club is not documented unambiguously by the available sources. The club itself gives the year 1928. According to a tradition reported in Salé, that date refers to the beginnings of the town's associative movement, marked by the creation of the Islamic Literary Club of Salé in 1927 and by the development of cultural and sporting activities in the following years.

Under its present name, the club appears in the press from November 1944, when an article described it as the revival of an earlier sports club of the town. Its headquarters were then located on rue de la Pépinière in Salé. Ahmed Aouad is the earliest president identified in the available sources, leading the club from the mid-1940s and serving as president during the 1950s.

In 1946, a special dispensation allowed AS Salé, together with Wydad of Casablanca, to field a team made up entirely of Moroccan Muslim players. In 1950, the press still described the town as having two clubs with distinct recruitment: AS Salé, whose squad was entirely Moroccan, and Club Athlétique de Salé, whose squad was entirely European.

=== 1970s and 1980s ===
AS Salé reached the first division in the late 1960s under manager Mohamed Laghlimi, and secured a second promotion at the end of the 1972–73 season. The club then established itself in the upper half of the first division table, finishing among the top six in the 1974–75, 1975–76, 1976–77, 1977–78 and 1978–79 seasons.

The squad of this period included several Moroccan internationals: goalkeeper Abdellatif Laâlou, who won the 1976 African Cup of Nations with Morocco; Abdelhay Benjilani, club captain and joint top scorer of the Moroccan league in 1973–74; Mohamed Mouh; and Mouncif El Haddaoui, who came through the club's youth system and played at the 1986 FIFA World Cup. Forward Mustapha Mahrous finished as runner-up top scorer in the Moroccan league in 1980–81 with 23 goals. Goalkeeper Badou Ezzaki played in the club's youth sides before joining Wydad of Casablanca.

The club was relegated to the second division at the end of the 1981–82 season, and returned to the top flight at the end of the 1984–85 season after beating Hilal of Nador on penalties, under manager Hassan Akesbi.

=== Second division years (1987–2002) ===
AS Salé was relegated again at the end of the 1986–87 season and remained in the second division until 2003.

In 2002, Sporting de Salé, formerly AS Crédit Agricole, ceased activity after being relegated to the amateur divisions, and several of its players joined AS Salé.

=== Return to the top flight (2003–2014) ===
Runner-up in the second division at the end of the 2002–03 season, the club returned to the first division and finished third in 2003–04. It took part in the Arab Club Champions Cup in 2004.

Relegated in 2007, the club won the second division the following season and returned to the top flight, before going down again at the end of the 2008–09 season. It reached the semi-finals of the 2012 Moroccan Throne Cup, then returned to the first division in 2013 under manager El Houssaine Ouchla for a single season, being relegated at the end of 2013–14.

Players of this period include Hamdi Laachir, Mehdi Berrahma, Mohamed Borji, Mohamed Hamdan, Chafiq Ziad, Mohamed Amine Kabli, Abdessamad Bouzidi, Mohamed Zouidi, Younes Sina, Malian international Aliou Kanté, and Youssef El Gnaoui.

In 2014, El Gnaoui's transfer to Raja of Casablanca for one million US dollars was then a record in the history of transfers in the Moroccan league. AS Salé received 400,000 dollars of that fee.

=== Decline (2014–2020) ===
After its relegation in 2014, the club failed to return to the top flight and repeatedly finished in the lower half of the second division table, notably in the 2018–19, 2019–20 and 2020–21 seasons.

The period was marked by instability in the club's leadership. In August 2018, president Abderrahim Hajji and the treasurer resigned from the board amid a financial crisis, leaving the club without a leadership as pre-season preparation approached. Abderrahmane Choukri, president until 2011 and again from 2018, resigned in May 2019 after several months of protests by supporters and former players. The general meeting of 2 August 2019 elected Abdelilah Qazdar, Choukri's nephew, as president.

=== Governance crisis (since 2020) ===
In January 2020, a group of club members formed under the name "corrective movement" (الحركة التصحيحية) held a press conference calling for reform of the club's governance. Its members criticised the running of the team, reported that members had been excluded from general meetings and that part of the public was boycotting matches, and announced that they had raised funds for an alternative project.

On 8 March 2021, the court of first instance of Salé annulled the general meeting of 2 August 2019.

Mohamed Jariri was elected president on 7 October 2021. Under manager and former international Mohamed Mouh, the team led the second division table by mid-November. On 16 November 2021, the board nevertheless dismissed Mouh, citing serious misconduct. The manager had previously publicly criticised a board member, accusing him of interfering in technical matters and of not wanting promotion to the first division. A member of the technical staff was dismissed at the same time, and assistant Abdessamad El Bouzidi took interim charge.

Jariri resigned on 1 February 2022, four months after his election. In a letter to the board, he cited pressure, conduct he considered unethical, and a campaign targeting him and his family. The press reported divisions within the board and declining results over the same period.

Vice-president Ali Zoubeidi succeeded him and resigned in December 2022, citing financial and administrative constraints which he attributed to the legacy of previous boards. A caretaker committee then ran the club and held a press conference in February 2023 to set out the team's situation.

On 1 March 2024, the court of first instance of Salé annulled the ordinary and extraordinary general meeting held on 25 August 2023 at Boubker Ammar Stadium, at which Nabil Ouaachi had become president, following an action brought by members of the club. The president resigned.

On the pitch, the club was relegated to the Amateur Excellence Division at the end of the 2023–24 season, and to Amateur Division One at the end of 2024–25.

The elective general meeting of 19 December 2024 appointed Yasser Sefiani, a surgeon and former director of the Ibn Sina University Hospital, as president, elected unanimously on his list. Karim Ouaabi succeeded him in 2025. The club finished ninth in Amateur Division One, northern group, in the 2025–26 season.

== Achievements ==
- Moroccan League Second Division: 4

1969, 1973, 1985, 2008

- Ahmed Antifit Tournament: 1

2003

== Managers ==
- (Serbia) Ivica Todorov (1995–1996)
- (Morocco) Zaki Badou (1996)
- (Morocco) El Houssaine Ouchla (2011–2013)
- (Morocco) Aziz El Khayati (12 June 2013 – 12 December 2013)
- (Morocco) Amine Benhachem (12 December 2013 – 2014)

== See also ==
- AS Salé (basketball)
