= COD Meknès =

Moroccan football club

- Full name: Club Omnisport De Meknès
- Founded: 21 June 1962; 64 years ago
- Ground: Stade d'honneur
- Capacity: 12,000
- Chairman: Mohamed El-Qadari
- Manager: Jorge Paixão
- League: Botola Pro
- 2025–26: Botola Pro, 9th of 16
- Website: codm.ma
Home colours	Away colours	Third colours

Club Omnisports De Meknès (Arabic: النادي المكناسي) is a Moroccan football club based in Meknes. The club came into being when four local teams; Rachad Meknassi, ASTF, Atlas and Alismailia merged on 21 June 1962.

== History ==
In 1956, Al-Ittihad Meknes was dissolved to make way for the young team of Rashad Club of Meknes. The latter could not resist in the first division, which caused an unprecedented sports crisis in the city of Ismailia. To solve this problem, the officials decided to merge Meknes Olympique Club, Rashad and Al Difaa from Beni Mohamed (a team from the third division).

== Honours ==
- Botola Pro: 1

Champion: 1995
Runner-up: 1981

- Botola Pro 2: 3

Champion : 1974–75, 2010–11, 2023–24

- Throne Cup: 1

Champion : 1966
Runner-up : 1981, 2011

== Performance in CAF competitions ==
- CAF Confederation Cup: 2 appearances

1996 – quarter final

2005 – first round
2012 – play-off round

== Managers ==
- (Kuwait) Aziz Al-Khayati
- (Switzerland) Raoul Savoy (2003–05)
- (Romania) Eugen Moldovan (2006–07)
- (Morocco) Abderrahim Talib (2012)
- (Morocco) Youssef Lemrini (Nov 2012 – 13 Jan)
- (Morocco) Hicham El Idrissi (Jan 2013 – 13 Feb)
- (Morocco) Abdelaziz Kerkache (Feb 2013–)

== Former players ==
- Abdelilah Sghir
- Abdellah Belbakri
- Abdelaziz El Amri
- Abdelwahed Benhsain
- El Mehdi Naaoua
- Hamza Bouhafra
- Mustapha El Khalfi
- Abdellah Bidane
- Mohamed Hcina
- Lahcen Seggari
- Jamal Drideb
- Kamal Dalil
- (Morocco) Abdeljalil Hadda
- Mohamed Yousfi
- Kamal Assou
- Abdellah Bodouma
- (Portugal) Carlos Gomes (footballer, born 1932)

== Former presidents ==
- Mohamed Lamrabet
- Ba Hamid Sidi Lahlou
- Idriss El-Alami
- Saleh Rhalaf
- Haj Mohamed Benabdeljalil
- Haj Salam Bennouna
- Abdelnabi Terrab
- Kamal El-Mandri
- Moulay Abdelrahman El-Bachiri
- Mustapha El-Baz
- Nourredine Kendouci
- Idriss El-Alami
- Abdelaziz Rehioui
- Idriss El-Alami
- Mohamed Saâdallah
- Hassan El-Mahmoudi
- Haj Mohamed Keddari
- Mohamed Saâdallah

== Sport equipment ==
- AB Sport
