= MC Oujda =

Moroccan football club

- Full name: Mouloudia Club of Oujda
- Nickname: ملوك الشرق (kings of the east)
- Founded: 16 March 1946; 80 years ago
- Ground: Honor Stadium
- Capacity: 35,000
- Chairman: Ziani Madani
- Manager: Abderrahim Saïdi
- League: Botola Pro 2
- 2025–26: Botola Pro 2, 9th of 16
Home colours	Away colours	Third colours

Mouloudia Club of Oujda (Arabic: مولودية وجدة), commonly abbreviated to MC Oujda, is a Moroccan football club based in Oujda. Mouloudia, which closely translates to "birth" in Arabic, was named after the coincidence of the day of its creation: on March 16, 1946 (12 second spring of 1365 Hjeria) with the anniversary of the birth of Muhammad.

Businessman Mohamed Houar became president of the club in 2017, and his investment led to a 2017–18 Botola 2 title followed by strong performances in the Botola the following seasons. However, the club faced a crisis in 2021 when Houar announced he was leaving the club, with players and staff striking over unpaid wages.

Ziani Madani was elected new president of the Mouloudia Club d'Oujda (MCO) during a general meeting held Thursday 7 March 2024 in Oujda at the headquarters of the Sports Leagues of the Oriental region.

== Achievements ==
- Moroccan League First Division

1975

- Moroccan Cup

1957, 1958, 1960, 1962

- Moroccan Super Cup

1958, 1960

- Moroccan League Second Division

1950, 1993, 2003, 2018

== Current squad ==
As of 15 April 2024

Note: Flags indicate national team as defined under FIFA eligibility rules; some limited exceptions apply. Players may hold more than one non-FIFA nationality.

No.	Pos.	Nation	Player
3	DF	MAR	Mohamed Qellis
5	MF	MAR	Habib Allah Dahmani (captain)
6	DF	MAR	Anass Nouader
7	FW	MAR	Oussama Radi
8	MF	MAR	Hamza Buihamghet
9	FW	MAR	Chouaib Faidi
10	MF	MAR	Ismail Gourad
11	MF	ITA	Zakaria Hamadi
13	FW	MAR	Youssef Malki
14	MF	MAR	Amine Souane
15	DF	MAR	Imad Serbout
16	FW	MAR	Anis Tabich
17	DF	MAR	Mohamed Bahadi

No.	Pos.	Nation	Player
20	MF	MAR	Achraf Kasbaoui
21	MF	MAR	Yassine Filali
23	FW	MAR	Akram Kaddouri
24	MF	MAR	El Habib Brija
25	DF	MAR	Karim El Oualadi
27	MF	MAR	Salaheddine Boukhnifrate
29	DF	MAR	Jaouad Bensaid
30	FW	MAR	Youssef Anouar
31	GK	MAR	Amine Amri
61	GK	MAR	Ziad Laafsa
77	FW	MAR	Nadir Lougmani
98	DF	MAR	Ayoub Kermaoui

== Kit supplier ==
Macron has been the team's kit supplier since the 2021–22 season.

== Managers ==
- (Poland) Ryszard Kulesza (1984–1986)
- (Algeria) Azzedine Aït Djoudi (2005–2006)
- (Algeria) Azzedine Aït Djoudi (2008)
- (Morocco) Faouzi Jamal (2011–2012)
- (Morocco) Hassan Regragui (2012–2014)
- (Morocco) Hassan Oughni (2014–2015)
- (Algeria) Azzedine Aït Djoudi (2015–2016)
- (Algeria) Abdelhak Benchikha (2019–2020)
- (Morocco) Abdeslam Ouaddou (2020–2021)
- (France) Bernard Casoni (2021)
- (Algeria) Nabil Neghiz (2021)
- (Morocco) Hilal Ettair (2021–2022)
- (Morocco) Mounir Jaouani (2022)
- (Morocco) Omar Najhi (2022–2023)
- (Morocco) Faozi Jamal (2023–2024)
- (Morocco) Mohamed Ben Messaoud (2024–2025)
- (Morocco) Mourad Fellah (2025)
- (Morocco) Abdelaziz Kerkache (2025–2026)
- (France) Bernard Casoni (2026)
- (Morocco) Abderrahim Saïdi (2026-present)
