= Throne Cup =

Moroccan association football league

- Organiser(s): Royal Moroccan Football Federation
- Founded: 1956; 70 years ago
- Region: Morocco
- Qualifier for: CAF Confederation Cup
- Current champions: Olympic Club Safi (1st title)
- Most championships: AS FAR (12 titles)
- Website: frmf.ma
- 2024–25 Moroccan Throne Cup

The Throne Cup (Arabic: كأس العرش) is an annual knockout football competition in domestic Moroccan football. First played during the 1956–57 season, it is the oldest football competition in Morocco. organized by the Royal Moroccan Football Federation.

The Throne Cup was established in 1956, shortly after Morocco’s independence. It brings together clubs from across the Moroccan football league system and is contested in a knockout format, with teams progressing through successive elimination rounds until two sides meet in the final.

The competition was originally played as a single-match tournament. In certain periods, however, some rounds were conducted over two legs (home and away), reflecting structural adjustments made over time.

The winners of the Throne Cup qualify for the following season’s CAF Confederation Cup. If the cup winners have already secured qualification for the CAF Champions League through their league position, the Confederation Cup berth is reallocated in accordance with national and CAF regulations, often to the runner-up.

AS FAR is the most successful club in the competition, having won 12 titles. Olympic Club Safi is the most recent winner, having defeated RS Berkane in the 2025 final.

== History ==
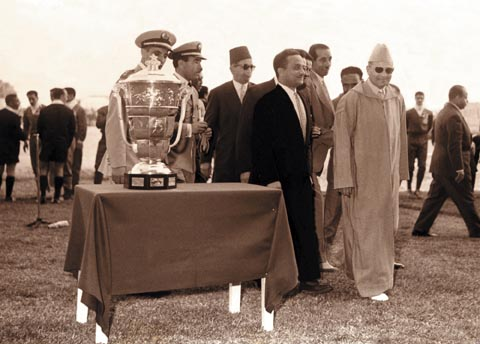
Mohammed V of Morocco and Haj Benjelloun in the 1959 Throne Cup final

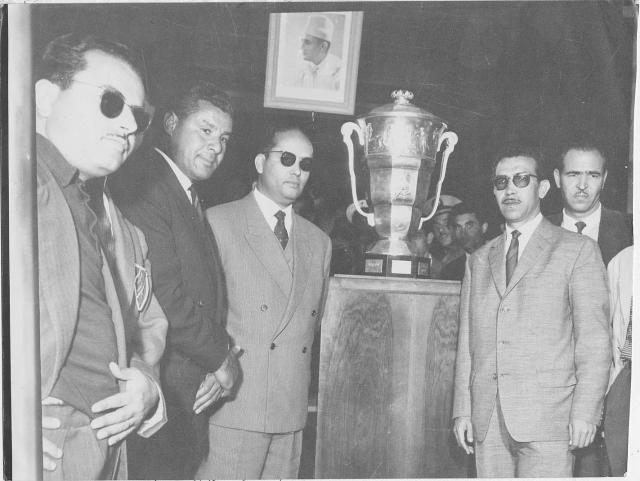
MC Oujda winner of the 1960 Throne Cup

=== Before independence (Coupe du Trône origins) ===
The history of Morocco's premier knockout competition traces back to the pre-independence era. The tournament was pioneered and established in **1946** under the framework of the Free League of Football (Ligue Libre de Football), spearheaded by national sports leader Abdeslam Benani . Created as an independent patriotic sporting initiative to counter the French protectorate's athletic control, this early iteration of the national cup laid the direct foundation for the official **Coupe du Trône** (Throne Cup), which was fully institutionalized following Morocco's independence in 1956 under the Royal Moroccan Football Federation.

=== After Independence: Birth of the Throne Cup ===
The Moroccan Throne Cup, known in French as Coupe du Trône, is the oldest official football cup competition in Morocco. It was first held in the 1956–57 season, shortly after Morocco gained independence, making it a symbolic tournament that reflects both national pride and footballing heritage.

The competition has used a knockout format open to clubs from all tiers of the Moroccan football league system since its inception. This allows amateur and lower-division clubs to compete against top-tier teams, occasionally producing unexpected results known as "giant-killings."

The first-ever winner of the Throne Cup was MC Oujda, who also won the first two editions consecutively (1957, 1958), marking a strong early presence. Over time, however, AS FAR (the Royal Army team) became the tournament’s most successful club, winning the title a record 12 times, followed closely by Wydad AC and FAR’s traditional rivals Raja CA.

The final is typically played at neutral venues and is one of the most watched domestic matches in Moroccan football. Notable stadiums such as Stade Mohammed V in Casablanca and Prince Moulay Abdellah Stadium in Rabat have hosted many finals over the years.

In addition to the prestige, the winner of the Throne Cup earns qualification for the CAF Confederation Cup, adding a continental dimension to the stakes. The cup also plays a vital role in giving exposure to young talents and smaller clubs, sometimes acting as a springboard for players’ careers.

The competition has survived through decades of Moroccan football evolution, political transitions, and club transformations, and continues to be a key highlight of the national football calendar. It represents not just sporting glory but also a deep connection between football and Moroccan national identity.

== Format ==
The current format features 4 preliminary rounds and the final phase. All games are one-legged.

The final phase starts with the Round of 32 where the 16 teams qualified from the fourth round are joined by all 16 Botola teams. Draws are "blind", meaning a Botola team can be drawn in one match with a team from the same league. The Round of 32 is followed by the Round of 16 matches, quarterfinals, semifinals and a final. Although not only one stadium has hosted the final, it is usually played in the Prince Moulay Abdellah Stadium in Rabat.

== Performance ==
=== Performance by clubs ===
List of football clubs ranked by total wins and runners-up.

Club	Winners	Runner-up	Winning years	Runner-up years
AS FAR	12	6	1959, 1971, 1984, 1985, 1986, 1999, 2003, 2004, 2007, 2008, 2009, 2020	1988, 1990, 1996, 1998, 2012, 2023
Wydad AC	9	7	1970, 1978, 1979, 1981, 1989, 1994, 1997, 1998, 2001	1957, 1958, 1961, 1964, 2003, 2004, 2021
Raja CA	9	6	1974, 1977, 1982, 1996, 2002, 2005, 2012, 2017, 2023	1965, 1968, 1983, 1992, 2013, 2022
FUS Rabat	6	3	1967, 1973, 1976, 1995, 2010, 2014	1960, 2009, 2015
KAC Marrakesh	6	2	1963, 1964, 1965, 1987, 1991, 1993	1962, 1997
MAS Fès	4	8	1980, 1988, 2011, 2016	1966, 1971, 1974, 1993, 2001, 2002, 2008, 2010
MC Oujda	4	1	1957, 1958, 1960, 1962	1959
RS Berkane	3	3	2018, 2021, 2022	1987, 2014, 2024
CO Casablanca	3	-	1983, 1990, 1992	
OC Khouribga	2	4	2006, 2015	1989, 1994, 1995, 2005
SCC Mohammédia	2	2	1972, 1975	1979, 1999
DH El-Jadida	1	4	2013	1977, 1985, 1986, 2017
Kenitra AC	1	3	1961	1969, 1976, 1991
RS Settat	1	3	1969	1967, 1970, 2000
COD Meknès	1	2	1966	1981, 2011
RAC Casablanca	1	1	1968	1972
OC Safi	1	1	2024	2016
Majd Casablanca	1	-	2000	
TAS Casablanca	1	-	2019	
HUS Agadir	-	3		1963, 2006, 2019
RS Kenitra	-	3		1978, 1982, 1984
US Sidi Kacem	-	2		1975, 1980
IZ Khemisset	-	1		1973
CR Bernoussi	-	1		2007
Wydad Fès	-	1		2018
MA Tétouan	-	1		2020

=== By city ===
City	Championships	Clubs
Casablanca	24	Wydad (9), Raja (9), CO Casablanca (3), RAC Casablanca (1), TAS Casablanca (1), Majd Casablanca (1)
Rabat	18	AS FAR (12), FUS Rabat (6)
Marrakesh	6	KAC Marrakech (6)
Fez	4	MAS Fès (4)
Oujda	4	MC Oujda (4)
Berkane	3	RS Berkane (3)
Khouribga	2	OC Khouribga (2)
Mohammedia	2	SCC Mohammédia (2)
Settat	1	RS Settat (1)
El Jadida	1	DH El-Jadida (1)
Kenitra	1	Kénitra AC (1)
Meknes	1	COD Meknès (1)
Safi	1	OC Safi (1)

== Records ==
- Most titles won: 12 wins
  - AS FAR (1959, 1971, 1984, 1985, 1986, 1999, 2003, 2004, 2007, 2008, 2009 and 2020)
- Most consecutive wins: 3 wins
  - AS FAR (1984, 1985, 1986) and (2007, 2008, 2009)
  - KAC Marrakech (1963, 1964 and 1965)
- Most Finals played: 18 finals
  - AS FAR
- Most finals lost: 8 finals
  - MAS Fes
- Most consecutive finals losses: 2, joint record:
  - Wydad AC (1956–57, 1957–58) (2002–03, 2003–04)
  - DH El-Jadida (1984–85, 1985–86)
  - OC Khouribga (1993–94, 1994–95)
  - MAS Fes (2000–01, 2001–02)
- Most final appearances without ever winning: 3, joint record:
  - HUS Agadir (1962–63, 2005–06, 2018–19)
  - RS Kenitra (1977–78, 1981–82, 1983–84)
- Most final appearances without losing (streak): 3, joint record:
  - KAC Marrakech (1962–63, 1963–64, 1964–65)
  - AS FAR (1983–84, 1984–85, 1985–86) (2006–07, 2007–08, 2008–09)
- Most final appearances without ever losing: 3 finals
  - CO Casablanca (1982–83, 1989–90, 1991–92)
- Longest gap between wins: 24 years, Wydad AC (2000–01–Present)
- Biggest win in a final: 4 goals (KAC Marrakech 4–0 RS Berkane, 1986–87)
