= KAC Marrakech =

Moroccan football club

Kawkab Marrakech
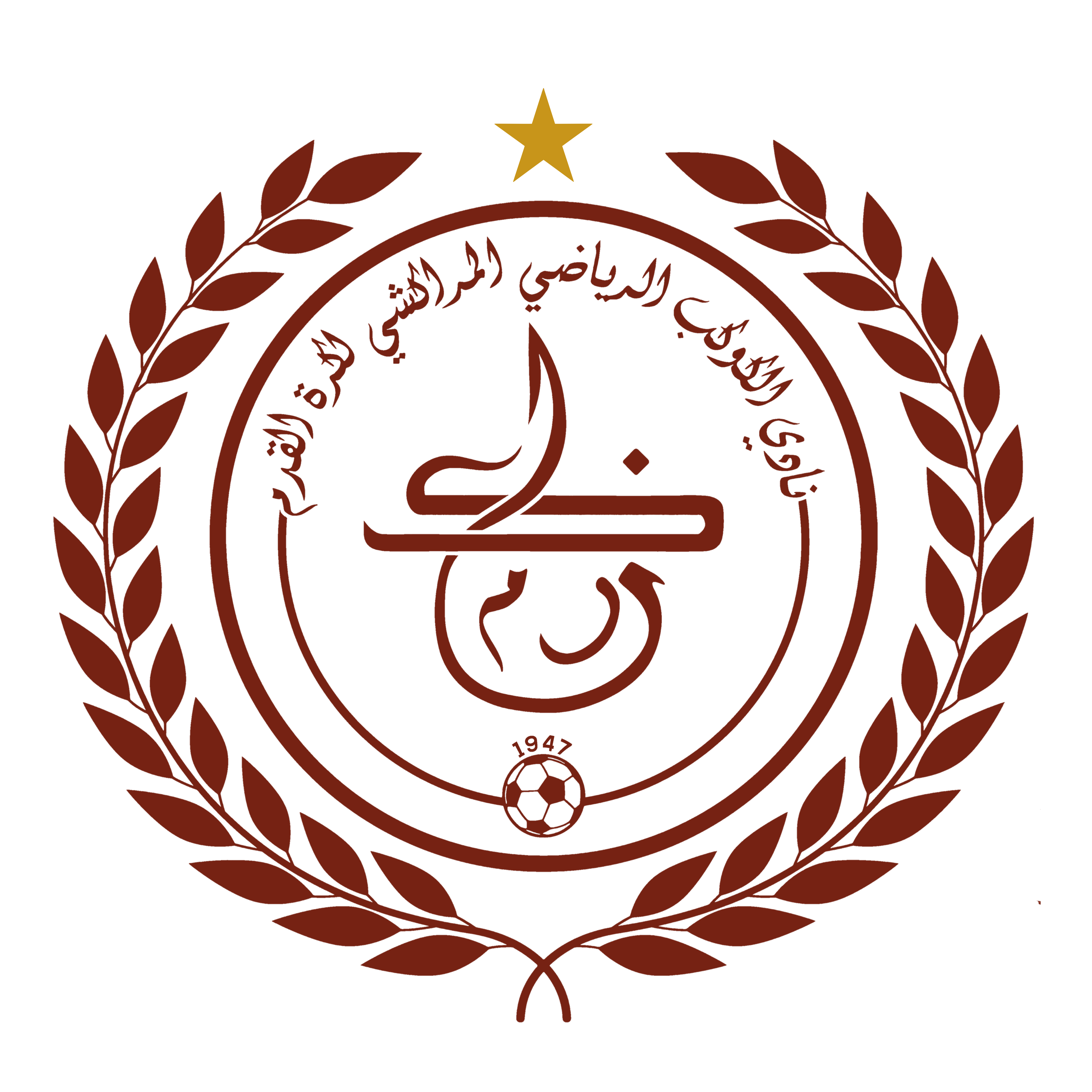
- Full name: Kawkab Athletic Club of Marrakesh
- Nickname: Kawkab Marrakech-Lkwika (فارس النخيل)
- Founded: 20 September 1947; 79 years ago
- Ground: Marrakesh Stadium
- Capacity: 45,240
- Chairman: Idriss Hanifa (Acting President)
- Manager: Youssef Safri
- League: Botola Pro
- 2025–26: Botola Pro, 10th of 16
- Website: https://kacmfoot.com/
Home colours	Away colours	Third colours

Kawkab Athletic Club of Marrakesh (Arabic: الكوكب المراكشي; KACM) is a Moroccan professional football club based in Marrakesh. The club was founded on 20 September 1947 by Hadj Idriss Talbi.

== History ==
On 2 May 2023, Kawkab was promoted to Botola 2 after leading the 2022–23 Moroccan Amateur National Championship.

== Current Squad ==
As of 2 October, 2026

Note: Flags indicate national team as defined under FIFA eligibility rules; some limited exceptions apply. Players may hold more than one non-FIFA nationality.

No.	Pos.	Nation	Player
1	GK	MAR	Mohamed Baayou
4	DF	MAR	Mohamed Adam Benhita
5	MF	MAR	Oussama Mahrous
7	FW	MAR	Hamza Founti
8	MF	MAR	Khalil Tamrani
11	FW	MAR	Saleh Essallami
12	DF	MAR	Akram El Hamdaoui
13	MF	MAR	Abdellah Haimoud
14	DF	MAR	Hamza Smaali
16	MF	MAR	Mahmoud El Kayssoumi
17	FW	MAR	Youssef Zghoudi
19	FW	MAR	Jawad Ghabra
20	DF	MAR	Mohssine Rabja
21	MF	MAR	Hamza Rafaa
22	GK	MAR	Abdelali Mhamdi
24	MF	MAR	Youssef Raiani

No.	Pos.	Nation	Player
25	DF	FRA	Nabil Khali
26	DF	MAR	Hamza Fassoukh
27	DF	MAR	Mohammed Battah
31	DF	MAR	Mohamed Elabdi
34	FW	MAR	Hamza Zagmouzi
37	GK	MAR	Naoufal Ait Oubna
44	DF	MAR	Ismail El Alami
67	GK	MAR	Amine El Ouaad
71	DF	SEN	Mohamed Welé
77	FW	MAR	Ayoub Maamouri
80	GK	MAR	Anass Rachak
88	MF	MAR	Mohamed Dadssi
99	FW	MAR	Oussama Haffari
-	DF	MAR	Abdelkrim Baadi
-	DF	GUI	Aboubacar Camara

== Honours ==
- Botola Pro: (2)

1958, 1992

- Moroccan Throne Cup: (6)

1963, 1964, 1965, 1987, 1991, 1993

- CAF Cup: (1)

1996

== Performance in CAF competitions ==
- African Cup of Champions Clubs: 1 appearance

1993: Second Round

- CAF Cup: 2 appearances

1996 - Champion
1997 - Second Round

- CAF Cup Winners' Cup: 2 appearances

1988 - withdrew in First Round
1995 - withdrew in First Round

Kawkab de Marrakech historical kit

== Managers ==
- (Morocco) Zaki Badou (2000–01), (2006–07), (2010–11)
- (Morocco) Fathi Jamal (Aug 9, 2009–May 31, 2011)
- (Morocco) Hicham Dmiai (June 1, 2012–1?)
- (Morocco) Ahmed Bahja (2016)
- (Morocco) Youssef Meriana (2016–2017)
- (Morocco) Faouzi Jamal (Apr 30, 2018–Dec 16, 2018)
- (Morocco) Aziz El Amri (Dec 16, 2018–Feb 18, 2019)
- (Morocco) Azedine Benis (interim) (Feb 18, 2019–Mar 12, 2019)
- (Morocco) Jawad Milani (Mar 12, 2019)
- (Morocco) Azedine Benis (Mar 12, 2019–Jun 9, 2019)
- (Morocco) Hicham El Idrissi (Jul 15, 2019–Oct 2nd, 2019)
- (Morocco) Hassan Oughni (Oct 2nd 2019–Nov 27th 2019)
- (Morocco) Ahmed Bahja (Dec 2019–Feb 2020)
- (Morocco) Mimoun Mokhtari (Feb 27th 2020, -)
