= List of Raja CA seasons =

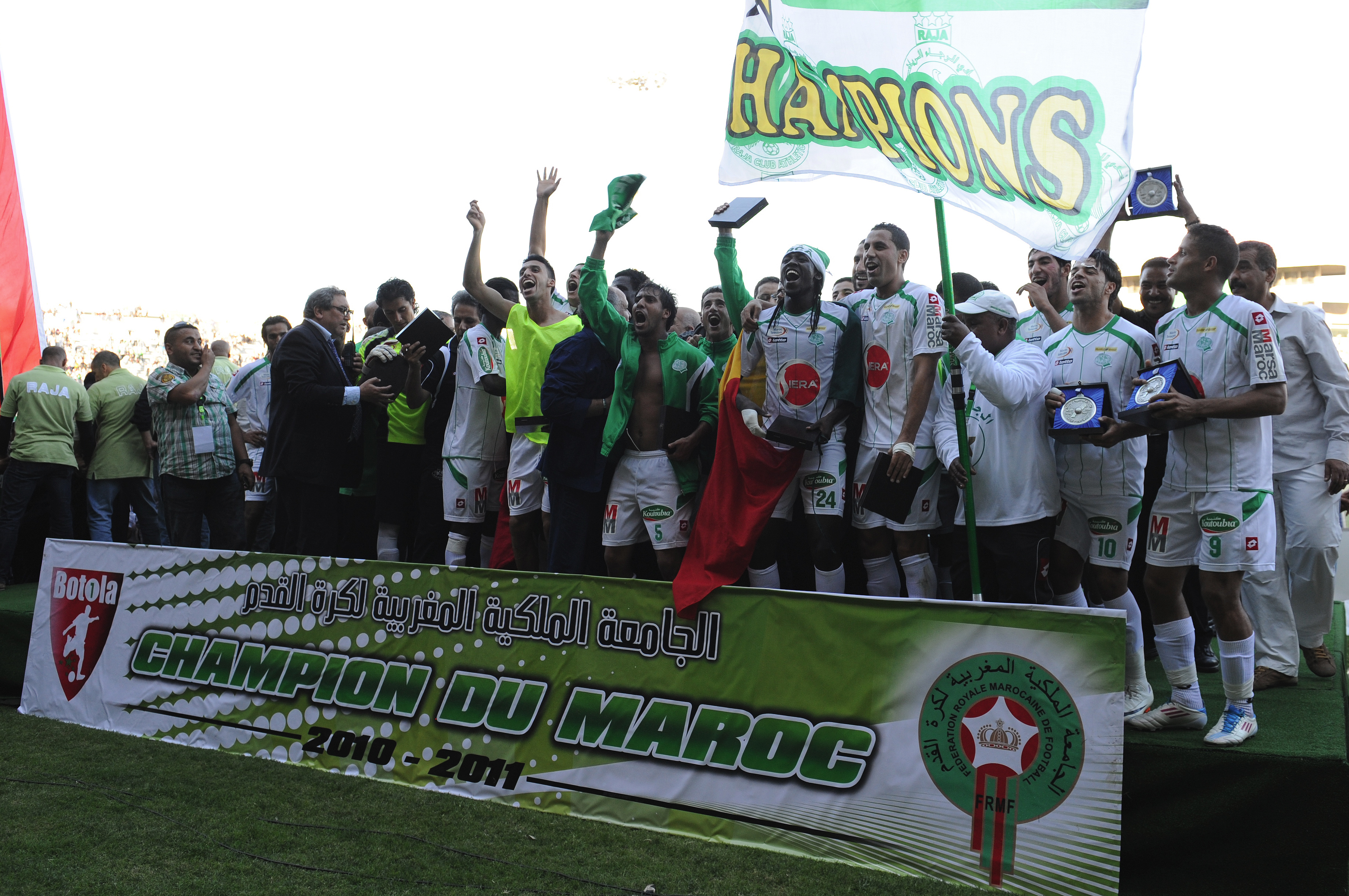
Raja players celebrate the club's 10th league title in 2010–11.

Raja Club Athletic (Arabic: نادي الرجاء الرياضي, romanized: Nādī ar-Rajāʾ ar-Riyāḍī) is a professional sports club based in Casablanca, Morocco. The club was founded on 20 March 1949 in Derb Sultan by a group of Moroccan nationalists and trade unionists, including Mohamed Naoui, the team's first coach, and Maati Bouabid, future Prime Minister and Minister of Justice, who regarded football as a way of resistance against the French colonizer, and wanted to join the sporting clubs of Casablanca. For more than a year, Raja only played friendly matches before receiving affiliation to Ligue du Maroc de Football Association at the start of the 1950–51 season, earning the right to join the national football leagues.

In 1950, composed of only Moroccan players, Raja began its journey from the lowest tier of the national football structure, and came at the top of the 4th division (Groupe Chaouia-Nord). The team played in the 1st Division (3rd tier) for a single season, finishing second of the 1951–52 edition and earning promotion to the Pré-honneur Division (second tier) where it would play for three seasons before sports competitions were boycotted then stopped in 1955. The following year, Raja will dominate the play-offs and established itself as one of the founding members of Botola under the newly created Royal Moroccan Football Federation, and played the first edition that debuted on 15 November 1956. Since this day, Raja is one of only three clubs never to have been relegated from the top tier of Moroccan football, the others being Wydad AC and AS FAR.

After the usurped 1959–60 Botola, Raja struggled to recover and lost two Throne Cup finals in 1965 and 1968. The first two trophies were gained in 1974 and 1977 and the team reached Botola podium five consecutive times between 1972 and 1977, but failed to win the title. This period is marked by players such as Abdelmajid Dolmy, Petchou, Houmane Jarir and Said Ghandi. The following decade was up and down but led to the first Botola title and the 1989 African Champion Clubs' Cup.

In the 1990s, Raja established its supremacy on national football by winning six consecutive leagues, and in Africa by gaining many titles in Champions League, African Super Cup and Afro-Asian Cup. In 2000, Raja was the first Arab and African team to qualify for the Club World Cup. This successful period is closely associated with players like Mustapha Moustawdae, Abdellatif Jrindou, Mustapha Khalif or Mustapha Chadli and managers like Vahid Halilhodžić and Oscar Fulloné who still remain the most successful in the club's history. The 2000s were marked by sporting instability mainly caused by the sale of key players to Europe or to The Gulf and the frequent manager changes. Nevertheless, the club won several international titles: 2003 CAF Cup, 2006 Arab Champions League and lost the 2002 Champions League final. After the 2013 Club World Cup final, Mohamed Boudrika's poor management dragged the club into a big financial crisis and caused setbacks in the league and the Champions League. His successor Said Hasbane did not improve the club's situation and resigned due to popular pressure in 2018. New president Jawad Ziyat got the ball rolling financially and Raja managed to win their first African title in fifteen years and their first Botola in seven years.

This list details the club's competitive performance and achievements for each season, and provides statistics and top scorers for national and international competitions.

== Key ==
Table headers

- Pos = Final position
- Pld = Matches played
- W = Matches won
- D = Matches drawn
- L = Matches lost
- GF = Goals for
- GA = Goals against
- Pts = Points

Divisions

LMFA (1922–1956)	D2 Chaouia-Nord = 4th tier 1st Division = 3rd tier Pré-honneur = 2nd tier
D1 (1956–1996), GNF1 (1996–2009), Botola 1 (2009–2011), Botola Pro (2011–)

Promotion
Botola Top scorer

Results and rounds

- 1st or W = Champion or Winner
- 2nd or RU = Runner-up
- 3rd = 3rd position
- SF = Semi-finals
- QF = Quarter-finals
- GS = Group stage
- R1 / R2 / R3 = First, second and third round
- R16 / R32 = Round of 16 and 32
- PR = Preliminary round

== Seasons ==
This list is updated as of 15 June 2024. Ongoing competitions are shown in italics.

Raja CA performance in domestic and international competitions by season
Season	League									Throne Cup	Competition	Result	Other competitions	Result	Top scorer(s)	
Season	Division	Pos	Pts	Pld	W	D	L	GF	GA	Throne Cup	Africa (Note: Sources: African Cup/CAF Champions League: Cup Winners' Cup: CAF Cup/Confederation Cup: Super Cup: Afro-Asian Club Championship:)		Other (Note: Sources: Arab Club Champions Cup/Champions League Arab Super Cup North African Cup of Champions UNAF Club Cup)		Player(s)	Goals
1949–50	Raja CA did not compete in competitive football and played only friendly matches.															
1950–51	Division Promotion (Groupe Chaouia-Nord)	1st	–	12	–	–	–	–	–	–	North African Cup	R1	—	—	—	—
1951–52	First Division	2nd	–	16	–	–	–	–	–	–	North African Cup	R1	—	—	—	—
1952–53	Pré-honneur	6th	–	22	–	–	–	–	–	–	North African Cup	R3	—	—	—	—
1953–54	Pré-honneur	5th	–	22	–	–	–	–	–	–	North African Cup	R2	—	—	—	—
1954–55	Pré-honneur	9th	–	22	–	–	–	–	–	–	North African Cup	R1	—	—	—	—
1955–56	National competitions were boycotted in 1956 due to political conflicts during the French Protectorate										North African Cup	R2	—	—	—	—
1956–57	D1	10th	60	30	11	8	11	34	38	R16	—	—	—	—	Acila	11
1957–58	D1	4th	61	28	10	13	5	33	20	R16	—	—	—	—	Acila	10
1958–59	D1	4th	57	26	10	11	5	34	25	SF	—	—	—	—	—	—
1959–60	D1 (Note: At the end of this season, a huge controversy broke out after the FRMF decided to play a tournament between the first three teams tied in terms of points while Raja was leading on goal difference. The club protested against this unfair decision and refused to participate. They were demoted to third place and a play-off was played between AS FAR and Kénitra AC.)	3rd	54	24	11	8	5	32	14	SF	—	—	—	—	Hanoun	22
1960–61	D1	5th	54	26	8	12	6	35	35	R16	—	—	—	—	Hanoun	11
1961–62	D1	7th	53	26	10	7	9	35	28	R16	—	—	—	—	—	—
1962–63	D1	3rd	54	26	9	10	7	35	28	QF	—	—	—	—	—	—
1963–64	D1	9th	52	26	8	9	9	29	34	SF	—	—	—	—	—	—
1964–65	D1	12th	50	26	6	12	8	25	29	RU	—	—	—	—	—	—
1965–66	D1	2nd	56	26	9	12	5	27	20	R16	—	—	—	—	—	—
1966–67	D1	3rd	65	30	10	15	5	33	19	R16	—	—	—	—	Houmane	18
1967–68	D1	3rd	73	34	12	15	7	42	29	RU	—	—	—	—	Houmane	16
1968–69	D1	13th	57	30	5	17	8	21	23	SF	—	—	—	—	—	—
1969–70	D1	3rd	66	30	11	14	5	26	17	QF	—	—	—	—	—	—
1970–71	D1	11th	57	30	7	13	10	28	32	R16	—	—	—	—	—	—
1971–72	D1	10th	58	30	8	12	10	36	41	R16	—	—	—	—	Ghandi	15
1972–73	D1	3th	63	30	11	11	8	36	31	R16	—	—	—	—	Petchou	13
1973–74	D1	2nd	63	30	12	9	9	34	26	W	—	—	—	—	Petchou	9
1974–75	D1	3th	66	30	10	16	4	47	28	R32	—	—	—	—	Ghandi	10
1975–76	D1	3th	66	30	10	16	4	34	29	SF	—	—	—	—	—	—
1976–77	D1	4th	64	30	14	6	10	33	25	W	—	—	—	—	—	—
1977–78	D1	10th	58	30	9	10	11	43	40	R32	—	—	—	—	—	—
1978–79	D1 (Note: The point scale used during this season is: (Win: 3pts, draw: 1pt, defeat: 0pt))	9th	39	30	9	12	9	30	28	R32	—	—	—	—	—	—
1979–80	D1	9th	59	30	8	13	9	29	26	QF	—	—	—	—	Lâarabi	11
1980–81	D1	3rd	83	38	16	13	9	45	24	R16	—	—	—	—	Lâarabi	10
1981–82	D1	5th	71	34	13	11	10	28	24	W	Cup Winners' Cup	R1	—	—	—	—
1982–83	D1	5th	63	30	12	9	9	27	19	RU	—	—	—	—	—	—
1983–84	D1	3rd	63	30	10	13	7	29	21	QF	—	—	—	—	Ouhammouch	9
1984–85	D1	6th	62	30	12	8	10	32	25	R16	—	—	—	—	—	—
1985–86	D1	2nd	91	38	20	13	5	48	17	R16	—	—	—	—	—	—
1986–87	D1 (Group B)	3rd	49	22	10	7	5	27	15	R32	—	—	—	—	—	—
1986–87	D1 (Plays-offs)	5th	16	8	2	4	2	7	8	R32	—	—	—	—	—	—
1987–88	D1	1st	79	34	18	9	7	30	14	QF	—	—	Arab Club Champions Cup	PR	—	—
1988–89	D1	9th	60	30	8	14	8	29	29	R32	African Cup	W	—	—	Jamal, Ouldmou, Diagne	7
1989–90	D1	5th	63	30	11	11	8	34	29	QF	African Cup	R2 (Note: Many RC Bafoussam players took part in the 1990 World Cup, so Raja accepted the postponement of the match. CAF reschedules the first leg for 25 July, a date which does not correspond to the club's calendar. Raja refused to travel to Cameroon and was disqualified.)	—	—	—	—
1990–91	D1	9th	60	30	9	12	9	29	28	QF	—	—	—	—	—	—
1991–92	D1	2nd	66	30	11	14	5	25	17	RU	—	—	—	—	—	—
1992–93	D1	2nd	64	30	9	16	5	26	14	SF	—	—	—	—	—	—
1993–94	D1	4th	64	30	12	10	8	21	15	R32	—	—	—	—	—	—
1994–95	D1	8th	59	30	9	12	9	26	23	R16	—	—	—	—	—	—
1995–96	D1 (Note: The current points scale is used since the 1995–96 season (Win: 3pts, Draw: 1pt, Loss: 0pt))	1st	57	30	16	9	5	43	16	W	—	—	Arab Club Champions Cup	RU	—	—
1996–97	D1	1st	55	30	15	10	5	45	24	R16	Champions League	W	Arab Super Cup	GS	—	—
1997–98	GNF1	1st	67	30	19	10	1	51	13	QF	Super Cup	RU	—	—	—	—
1997–98	GNF1	1st	67	30	19	10	1	51	13	QF	Champions League	SF	—	—	—	—
1998–99	GNF1	1st	62	30	17	11	2	42	14	R32	Afro-Asian Championship	W	—	—	—	—
1998–99	GNF1	1st	62	30	17	11	2	42	14	R32	Champions League	W	—	—	—	—
1999–2000	GNF1	1st	59	30	16	11	3	45	22	QF	FIFA Club World Championship	GS	—	—	—	—
1999–2000	GNF1	1st	59	30	16	11	3	45	22	QF	Super Cup	W	—	—	—	—
1999–2000	GNF1	1st	59	30	16	11	3	45	22	QF	Champions League	QF	—	—	—	—
2000–01	GNF1	1st	64	30	19	7	4	33	12	SF	Champions League	R2	—	—	—	—
2001–02	GNF1	3rd	55	30	16	7	7	42	18	W	Champions League	RU	—	—	Diallo	15
2002–03	GNF1	2nd	52	30	13	13	4	36	18	SF	CAF Cup	W	Arab Unified Club Championship	SF	Aboucherouane	23 (Note: He also finished top scorer of the 2002 Champions League with 7 goals and the 2003 CAF Cup with 7 goals)
2003–04	GNF1	1st	56	30	15	11	4	40	19	QF	Champions League	R1	—	—	Bidoudane	15
2004–05	GNF1	2nd	60	30	18	6	6	42	17	W	Champions League	SF	—	—	Alloudi	16
2005–06	GNF1	4th	51	30	13	12	5	34	24	QF (Note: Raja did not show up in protest against the match schedule and was sanctioned with a 3–0 loss)	Champions League	R2	—	—	Bidoudane	12
2005–06	GNF1	4th	51	30	13	12	5	34	24	QF	Confederation Cup	R4	Arab Champions League	W	Bidoudane	12
2006–07	GNF1	11th	35	30	7	14	9	23	20	QF	—	—	Arab Champions League	R16	Alloudi	17
2007–08	GNF1	3rd	48	30	12	12	6	32	23	QF	—	—	Arab Champions League	GS	Senghor	9
2008–09	GNF1	1st	61	30	17	10	3	44	17	R32	—	—	Arab Champions League	R16	Moutouali	10
2009–10	Botola 1	2nd	52	30	14	10	6	39	26	R16	Champions League	R2	North African Cup of Champions	SF	Najdi	13
2010–11	Botola 1	1st	60	30	18	6	6	45	23	R32	Champions League	GS	—	—	Taïr	8
2011–12	Botola Pro	4th	51	30	14	9	7	34	24	W	Champions League	R2	—	—	Salhi	16
2012–13	Botola Pro	1st	66	30	19	9	2	56	24	RU	—	—	UAFA Cup	SF	Iajour	12
2013–14	Botola Pro	2nd	55	30	16	7	7	40	15	R16	2013 Club World Cup	RU	—	—	Iajour	16 (Note: He also finished top scorer of the Club World Cup with 2 goals)
2013–14	Botola Pro	2nd	55	30	16	7	7	40	15	R16	Champions League	R2	—	—	Iajour	16
2014–15	Botola Pro	8th	38	30	9	11	10	37	34	SF	Champions League	R3	—	—	Hafidi	9
2014–15	Botola Pro	8th	38	30	9	11	10	37	34	SF	Confederation Cup	R4	—	—	Hafidi	9
2015–16	Botola Pro	5th	47	30	13	8	9	48	30	R32 (Note: Raja forfeited the match in protest against the referee)	—	—	—	—	Hafidi	12
2016–17	Botola Pro	3rd	57	30	15	12	3	42	17	W	—	—	UNAF Cup	W	Erraki	10
2017–18	Botola Pro	6th	48	30	13	9	8	45	31	SF	Confederation Cup	W	—	—	Iajour	25
2018–19	Botola Pro	2nd	55	30	15	10	5	56	36	R32	Confederation Cup	GS	—	—	Iajour	29
2018–19	Botola Pro	2nd	55	30	15	10	5	56	36	R32	Super Cup	W	Arab Club Champions Cup	QF	Iajour	29
2019–20	Botola Pro	1st	60	30	17	9	4	43	23	QF	Champions League	SF	Arab Club Champions Cup	W	Moutouali	15
2020–21	Botola Pro	2nd	59	30	17	8	5	48	26	QF	Champions League	R1	—	—	Malango	24 (Note: He also finished top scorer of the Confederation Cup with 6 goals)
2020–21	Botola Pro	2nd	59	30	17	8	5	48	26	QF	Confederation Cup	W	—	—	Malango	24
2021–22	Botola Pro	2nd	60	30	17	9	4	41	21	QF	Super Cup	RU	—	—	Ahaddad	12
2021–22	Botola Pro	2nd	60	30	17	9	4	41	21	QF	Champions League	QF	—	—	Ahaddad	12
2022–23	Botola Pro	5th	44	30	11	11	8	31	26	RU	Champions League	QF	—	—	Khabba	8
2023–24	Botola Pro	1st	72	30	21	9	0	52	15	W	—	—	Arab Club Champions Cup	QF	Bouzok	16
2024–25	Botola Pro	5th	48	30	12	12	6	38	25	R16	Champions League	GS	—	—	Ennafati	13
2025–26	Botola Pro	3rd	56	30	16	8	6	39	19	—	—	—	—	—	Ennafati	6
2026–27	Botola Pro	–	–	30	–	–	–	–	–	—	Confederation Cup	—	—	—	—	—
Season	Division	Pos	Pts	Pld	W	D	L	GF	GA	Throne Cup	International competitions		Other competitions		Players	Goals
