= History of Raja CA (1949–1990) =

History of a Moroccan football club

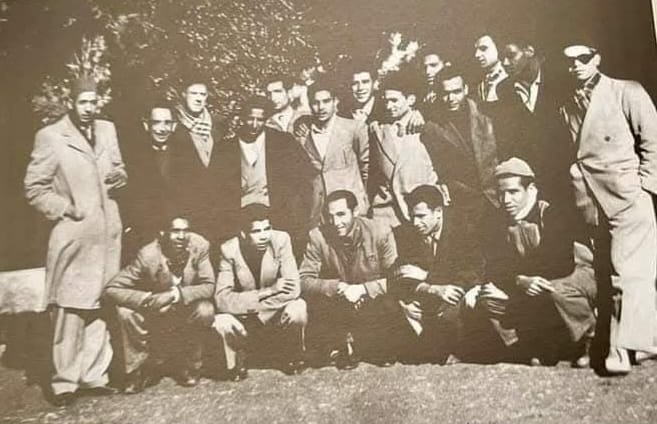
Raja's team training in Ifrane in 1949

The history of Raja CA from 1949 to 1990 covers the period from the club's foundation, through the appointment of Père Jégo as manager in 1957, their first period of success between 1973 and 1977, to winning the 1989 African Cup of Champion Clubs.

The club was founded on 20 March 1949 in Derb Sultan by a group of Moroccan nationalists who regarded football as a way of resistance, and wanted to join the football clubs of Casablanca. For more than a year, Raja only played friendly matches before receiving affiliation to the Moroccan League before the 1950–51 season. With an all-Moroccan squad, Raja began its journey from the lowest tier of the national football structure, and won the fourth division. The team finished second of the 1951–52 first Division, securing promotion to the Pré-honneur Division (second tier) where they competed for three seasons before sporting activities were boycotted and subsequently suspended in 1955. The next year, Raja won the play-offs and established itself among the founding clubs of the Botola, organized by the newly created Royal Moroccan Football Federation, and played the first edition that debuted on 15 November 1956. Since then, Raja has been among only two clubs to feature in every season of it.

After the events surrounding the 1959–60 Botola, in which Raja was unfairly denied the title, the club struggled to recover and lost two Throne Cup finals in 1965 and 1968. They claimed their first two major trophies in 1974 and 1977, but they could not translate their league consistency into a title, recording five successive top-three finishes between 1972 and 1977. This period is marked by players such as Abdelmajid Dolmy, Petchou, Houmane Jarir and Said Ghandi. The following decade was up and down until the appointment of Fernando Cabrita, who implemented an unprecedented degree of discipline and led them to their first Botola title. Rabah Saâdane succeeded him the following season and guided them to African glory, claiming the 1989 African Cup of Champion Clubs.

== Early years (1949–56) ==
Laâchfoubi El Bouazzaoui and Hamidou El Watani, two of the main figures behind the club's creation

=== Football in Derb Sultan ===
At the dawn of the 20th century, football started to spread across Morocco, especially in Casablanca. Many clubs were founded in the city after the imposition of the French protectorate over the Kingdom in 1912, such as Union Sportive Marocaine (1913), Racing Athletic Club (1917), or Union Sportive Athlétique (1920). But certain clubs existed way before such as Club Athlétique Marocain founded in 1902 or Olympique de Casablanca created in 1904. In 1922, Moroccan football was first formalized through the founding of the Moroccan Football League Association, tasked with running domestic competitions. Under the aegis of the French Football Federation, it became a member of FIFA the same year and a member of the Union of North African Leagues in 1926.

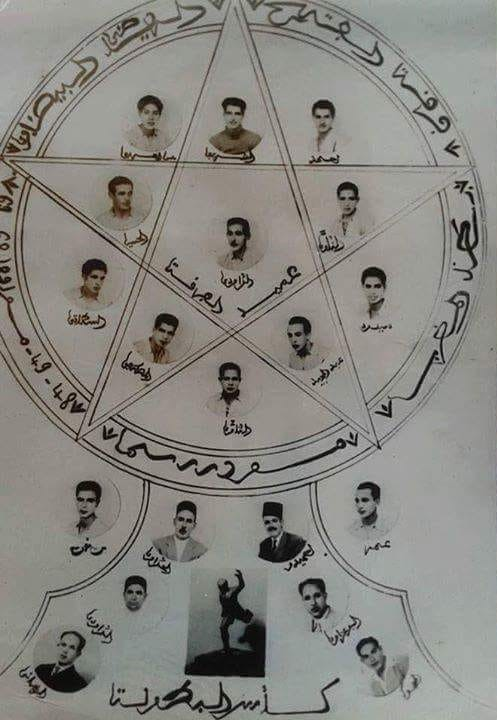
Fath Casablanca, champions of the 1948–49 Free League

In the late 1940s in Derb Sultan, a working-class neighborhood and one of the main strongholds resistance against the French, there was no football team that competed with the elite. The best club in Derb Sultan was Al Watan, which was founded by Laâchfoubi El Bouazzaoui and Hamidou El Watani in 1930. This club is notably known for starting the career of Larbi Benbarek. In 1946, the Free Moroccan League was created under the leadership of Ahmed Lyazidi, who would later become the first president of the FRMF, to boycott the Moroccan League Association, which imposed strict regulations on Moroccan clubs. Derb Sultan was represented by several teams in the Free League, including Atlas Derb Sultan, Inbiaate Bouchentouf, Al Wifaq and Al Nassr. Al Watan was renamed Fath Casablanca in 1946. On 19 June 1949, Fath won the Free League after beating Charaf Rbati in the final 3–1, led by player-coach Mohamed Naoui and the captain Maati Daoudi. Within the circles of Derb Sultan's leading nationalists, an ambition to form a new club arose, in order to gather the finest players from local amateur teams to challenge for a place in the Moroccan League.

Maâti Daoudi and Hajji Ben Abadji, the first two presidents
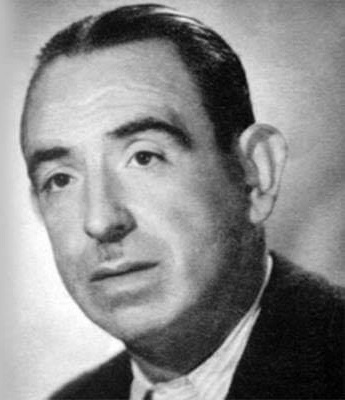

=== Foundation ===
Meetings took place at Hamidou's Al Watan café, at Bouya Saleh café (which still exist today) and at Hajji Ben Abadji's contract drafting office. The founding members sought to preserve the club from any foreign influence, because the colonial regulations mandated the appointment of French citizens as presidents. They bypassed this law by formally naming Hajji Ben Abadji, a French-Algerian, as president while Maati Daoudi exercised the effective presidency. The latter would later become the first treasurer of the FRMF in 1957 and a co-founder of the Labour Football Federation in 1959.

Raja Club Athletic was officially founded on 20 March 1949 at Bouya Saleh café, No. 80 Abbasids street, Derb Sultan. Several personalities participated in the founding of the club: Hamidou El Watani, Laâchfoubi El Bouazzaoui, Mohamed Naoui and his brother Abdellah, Boujemaâ Kadri, Maati Bouabid, Maati Daoudi and his brother-in-law Mohamed Daoudi, Hajji Ben Abadji and his brother Mohamed, Ahmed Skalli, Haddaoui Nejjar, Mohamed Rihani, Tibari, Abdelkader Ben Bouazza, Mohamed Azerkane, Ahmed Bensalem, Mohamed Ziyani et El Hachemi Ben Omar. Since Fath was already used by Fath Union Sport, they agreed to change it to Raja (الرجاء), meaning hope or anticipation. Mohamed Naoui proposed the full name Raja Club Athletic and the word RCA as its acronym, inspired by the Radio Corporation of America. They also chose the eagle as their crest and green and white as their colors. The club changed its headquarters and moved to Derb Kallouti No. 122, 5th Street, Derb Sultan.

=== First steps ===
After its creation, the squad was then made up exclusively of Moroccan players, most of whom came from Derb Sultan. They played their home matches at L'hwiyet (meaning pony wall), because of the low walls that were surrounding the pitch located on 2 Mars Avenue. The club only played friendly games during a year before receiving affiliation with the Moroccan League Association in the summer of 1950, allowing them to join the national leagues. On 15 July 1950, Mohamed Naoui received his coaching license and became the first coach in the club's history. He played for the LMFA Moroccan national team and was considered as one of the best forwards of the Protectorate era.

The committee after the meeting of February 10, 1950
Fonction	Noms	Nationalité
President	Maati Daoudi	Morocco
Honorary president	Abdelkader Ben Bouazza	Morocco
Vice presidents	Hajji Ben Abadji	Algeria / France
Vice presidents	Idriss Ben El Arbi	Morocco
Secretary general	Mohamed Rihani	Algeria / France
Secretary general	Mohamed Ben Abdelkader	Morocco
Treasurers	Laâchfoubi El Bouazzaoui	Morocco
Treasurers	Mahjoub Ben Ahmed	Morocco
Directeur sportif	Mohamed Naoui	Morocco
Board members	Mohamed Ben Abadji	Algeria / France
Board members	El Houssine ben Mekki	Morocco

On 17 September, Raja made their international debut against AS Ben Ahmed in the 1950–51 North African Cup qualifying rounds and won by forfeit, because the opposing team did not show up for the match. Raja starts their national campaign within the Chaouia-Nord Group of the Second Division (Casablanca Group), the fourth level of Moroccan football. Exempted from the first game scheduled on 1 October 1950 (the group was composed of seven teams), the Eagles entered the competition on 8 October against AS Police Casablanca.

First match in the North African Cup
US Fes 5–2 Raja CA
15 October 1950, Stade Mohammed-V (Fez)

On 15 October, Raja lost in the second round of the North African Cup against Union sportif de Fez (5–2). The starting line-up was; Belaid, Daoudi Maati, Ahmed Hamraoui, Mohamed Naoui, M'Hamed ben Abderrahmane, Mustapha, M'Barek Mangala, Ahmed ben Larbi, Mohamed ben Abdelkader, Mohamed Omar and Mohamed Weld Sbaiya, who scored a brace. On 8 April 1951, after beating AS Boulhaut (Benslimane) at Stade l'Hermitage, Raja won the First Division and thus secured promotion. They then reached the semi-finals of the Promotion League and was promoted to the First Division. On 23 September, the Greens hosted JSM Oujda in their new league debut. A week later, on 30 September, Raja was narrowly eliminated from the 1951–52 North African Cup by AS Amal Essouira (3–2 a.e.t). On 10 November 1951, Hajji Ben Abadji was elected president after having served as vice-president of Maati Daoudi. This assembly appoints Mohamed Naoui as sporting director and replaces him with Abdelkader Jalal as coach. Nicknamed "the educator of generations", he led the development of multiple generations of players until his retirement after a tragic accident on 23 May 1989, that resulted in the loss of his left hand.

The club's committee after the November 1951 assembly
Fonction	Name	Nationality
President	Hajji Ben Abadji	Algeria / France
Honorary presidents	Mohammed Ben Haj Abbas	Morocco
Honorary presidents	Mohamed Ben Abadji	Algeria / France
Vice presidents	Laâchfoubi El Bouazzaoui	Morocco
Vice presidents	Maati Bouabid	Morocco
Vice presidents	Ahmed Skalli	Morocco
Secretary general	Mohamed Rihani	Algeria / France
Secretary general	Ahmed Bensalem	Morocco
Treasurers	Mustapha - Mahjoub	Morocco
Sporting director	Mohamed Naoui	Morocco
Manager	Abdelkader Jalal	Morocco
Board members	Lachemi - Chebeb - Driss Lahcen - Abderrahmane Mohamed Azerkane - Ziani - Abdellah Naoui - Haj Ahmed - Brahim	Morocco

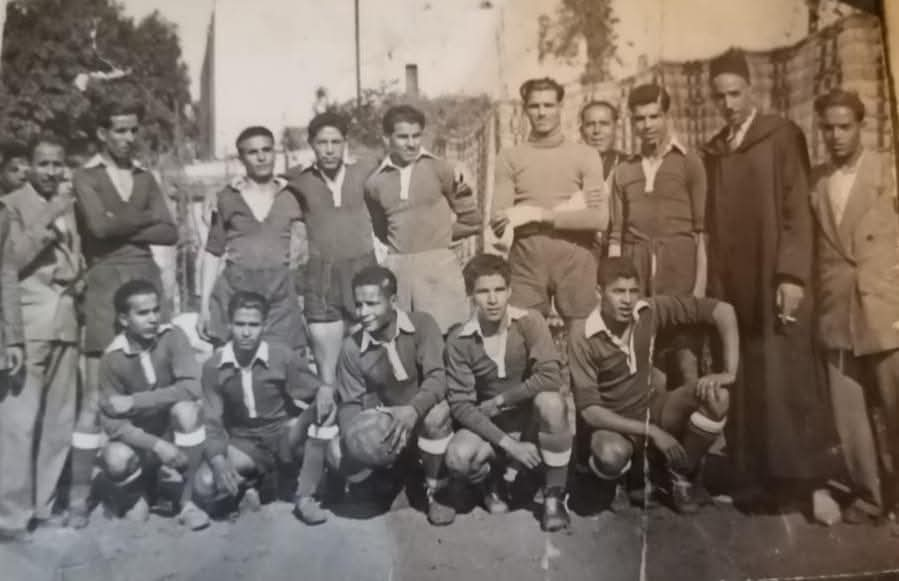
Raja before a match in Casablanca in 1950

On 11 May 1952, Raja played their ultimate game of the season against Kawkab Marrakech to decide the champion since the two were assured of promotion (2–0 loss). Thanks to a group of talented players such as Mohamed Roudani, Hamid Bahij and Moussa Hanoun, they achieved promotion to Division Pré-Honneur, the second level of national football. On 7 September, they lost their debut match against Idéal Club Marocain (2–1). On 6 June 1952, Maati Bouabid, then vice-president and team captain, obtained the Moroccan legal and administrative studies certificate before taking the lawyer's oath and ending his playing career.

On 26 October, the Greens faced US Safi in the second round of the 1952–53 North African Cup. After an extra time 2–2 draw (goals of Mustapha and M'hamed), they won in Safi (2–1) to face Union Sportive Marocaine, the best team of the colonial era and mainly composed of French players. On 16 November, Raja were losing before Laïdi equalized in the 75th minute (1–1). Jalal lined up the following team: Bensaïd, Bettache, Filali, Djillali, Roudani, Mestassi, Laïdi, Ahmed Ben Salah, Omar, Sbaiya and Belaïd. The match was replayed on 21 December at Stade Philip (5–0 defeat).

The elected committee for the 1953–54 season
Fonction	Noms	Nationalité
President	Hajji Ben Abadji	Algeria / France
Honorary presidents	Mohamed Ben Haj Abbas	Morocco
Honorary presidents	Ben Tahar Lemchambi	Morocco
Honorary presidents	Mohamed Ben Abadji	Algeria / France
Vice presidents	Mahjoub	Morocco
Vice presidents	Mohamed Mozi	Morocco
Vice presidents	Mohamed Azerkane	Morocco
Secretary general	Mohamed Yatta	Morocco
Secretary general	Amar Choukry	Morocco
Treasurers	Mustapha Chemseddine	Morocco
Treasurers	Aissa Ben Bouchaib	Morocco
Sporting director	Maati Bouabid	Morocco
Manager	Abdelkader Jalal	Morocco
Doctor	Dr Khatib	Morocco
Board members	Boujemaa Kadri - Dris - Hychi	Morocco

During the 1953–54 season, Raja beat USTO in the first round of the North African Cup but lost to Sporting athlétique de Marrakech, the reigning Moroccan champions. On 30 November 1953 in front of 1,250 spectators, Raja narrowly missed out on qualification, losing 1–0 despite dominating the match and facing bad refereeing. At the end of this season, Raja failed to gain promotion. On 28 November 1954, Raja exited the 1954–55 North African Cup against Racing AC (2–0).

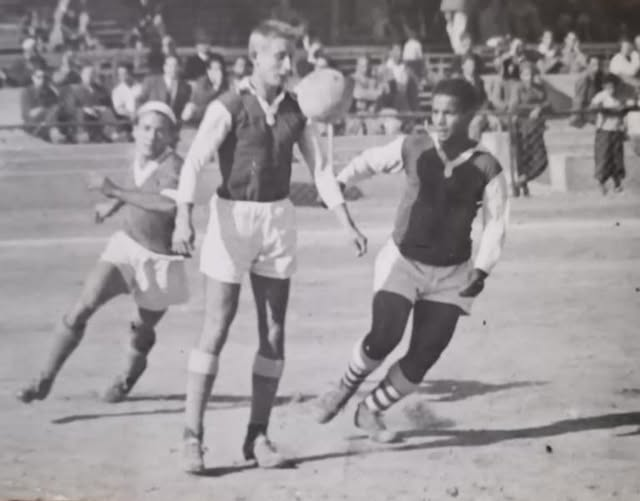
Mohamed Naoui with Raja playing the 1950–51 Promotion League at Stade Philip

On 11 December 1955, following a difficult start to the season and growing internal disagreements, Maati Bouabid revived the former committee, which had ceased to operate in recent years. When called upon for support, founding president Maati Daoudi rallied his former colleagues. After lengthy discussions, the following changes were approved: Honorary president: Maati Daoudi; Active president: Maati Bouabid; Vice presidents: Laachfoubi El Bouazzaoui, Hajji Ben Abadji, and Mahjoub ben Ahmed; General Secretary: Mohamed Rihani; Treasurer: Mustapha Chemseddine; Sporting director: Mohamed Naoul. Abdelkader Lakhmiri was appointed head coach for the remainder of the season, and Abdelkader Jalal was assigned to the youth teams.

In early August 1955, the Moroccan Football League Association announced that the national championships would begin on 4 September. On 31 August, the French Resident-General, in agreement with the League, decided to postpone this date because the clubs protested the promotion of US Safi to the First Division without playing the playoffs against Maghreb AS; both sides were in tie. On 2 November 1955, Raja lost to Maghreb Sportif de Rabat (2–0) in the second round of the 1955–56 North African Cup, the twentieth and last edition which would not be completed. On 4 December, they beat them back 4–0 in the criterium that replaced the championship.

== Debut after independence (1956–64) ==
=== Playoffs and Père Jégo ===

Final match of Botola's playoffs
Raja CA 7–0 Olympique Ouazzane
7 October 1956, Stade Philip (Att: 8000)

After the cease of the national leagues in 1955, a criterium replaced them to ensure football's continuity. But political unrest followed by Morocco's declaration of independence on 2 March 1956 led to the cancellation of this competition as well. The Royal Moroccan Football Federation was created to replace the Moroccan Football League Association. For its first season, the FRMF received the affiliations of 310 clubs and 6087 players. Each team must play three matches and win as many to join the elite division. Maâti Bouabid recruited Kacem Kacemi to lead the team through the playoffs.

Raja began its campaign in the second round (Chaouia League) by defeating KSNAC (4–1) and US Ben Ahmed (2–0, goals from Moussa Hanoun and Abderrahmane Acila). On 7 October 1956 at Stade Philip, Raja hosted Olympique de Ouezzane for the decisive match. Thanks to two braces of Hamid Bahij and Moussa Hanoun, they crushed their opponents 7–1 and became the first team to secure a place in the first division, as the match was played at 8:30 a.m., establishing itself as one of the founding members of Botola. This match served also counted as the first round of the Throne Cup. This new competition quickly gained great prestige since it represents the Alaouite Dynasty and whose trophy is usually handed over to the winner by a member of the royal family. After the playoffs, Kacem Kacemi left and Laâchfoubi El Bouazzaoui succeeded to Hajji Ben Abadji as president.

In December 1956, after a brief interim of Abdelkader Jalal, Raja engaged the man who would shape its identity; Affani Mohamed Ben Lahcen alias Père Jégo. He was the first Moroccan to get a football coaching licence and founder of Wydad AC's football section, he was pushed out by the players and the board for unclear reasons. After playing a pragmatic style with Wydad, Père Jégo developed a different system with Raja, inspired by South American football. Based on fluid movement and short passes, this approach emphasised attractive football, occasionally at the expense of results, allowing players to display their skills. He said that the physiological capacities of Moroccans are closer to those of South Americans than to Europeans, it is therefore more logical to take inspiration from it. The fans nicknamed their team Raja L'fraja (Raja the show in Arabic). Opened in 1955 under the name Stade Marcel-Cerdan, Stade Mohammed V (Stade d'honneur until 1983) became the main home ground of Raja, Wydad and the Moroccan national team in 1957.

=== Botola debut ===
Abderrahmane Acila facing Wydad's goalkeeper Mohamed Choukri during the first Casablanca Derby

In order to prepare for their first season among the elite, Raja played several friendly matches and tournaments. On 15 February 1956, they beat SCC Roches Noires 2–0 in the semi-final of the 1956 Coupe de Casablanca, but political trouble forced the postponement of the final. After the independence, they played the final on 7 April against Tihad AS and lost 3–1. The Coupe d'ouverture de la saison was organized just before the start of the season. On 31 August 1956, a 2–2 draw saw Raja lose to ASPTT Casablanca under a tournament tie-breaker rule that gave the advantage to the team with the higher corner count. They won the third place play-off against Tihad AS (4–2).

On 10 November 1956, Raja made their debut in the first edition of Botola, and lost to Fath Union Sports (2–0), but the team recovered on the next match and won on 17 November against SCC Roches Noires thanks to two goals of Ahmed Naoui and Hamid Bahij, who therefore became the first goalscorer of the club in Botola. On 10 February 1957, the first Casablanca Derby took place at Stade Philip against Wydad, which was already intense because of Père Jégo's relation with his former club. Raja won 1–0, courtesy of an Mohamed Laâchir El Ouejdi goal, who scored a long shot in Mohamed Rifki's net. For its first season among the elite, the team finished tenth and exited from the Throne Cup in the second round against Kawkab of Marrakech in a replay (1–0), after a 2–2 draw. Raja's top scorers were Abderrahmane Acila and Hamid Bahij, netting 11 and 5 goals respectively. Meanwhile, Raja took over the Aviation Complex after the dissolution of US Marocaine, and was named the Raja-Oasis Sports Complex. It was chosen to be the first team training center and the main youth academy. Until that point, they had been operating without an established home ground, they used stadiums such as L'hwiyet, Stade Jrid or Stade de la Jeunesse. The club's headquarters were located in Grigouane district, no. 122 5th street, Derb Sultan.

In the 1957–58 season, the club finished fourth and failed to make it past the Throne Cup's second round. The following season, Raja were leading midway through the league after a 13-match unbeaten run (it's called being an autumn champion in Morocco), but failed to keep up their pace and finished fourth. The team reached the semi-finals of the Cup for the first time, a draw against MC Oujda forced the two teams to replay the fixture which favored the Orientals 3–0.

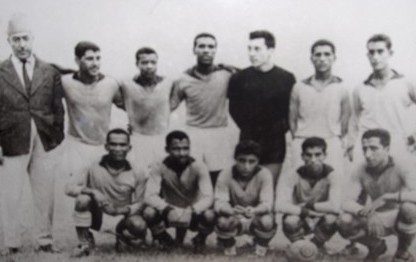
Raja's team in 1957. Standing from right to left: Mohamed, Bouchaib, Pierre Maquet, Roudani, Benâacher, El Ouejdi, Père Jégo. Seated from right to left: P'tit Ahmed, Milazzo, Acila, Moussa, Mangala.

=== Usurped title ===
During the 1959 summer, Raja CA won the Cherkaoui Cup after beating Racing AC (1–0) and Étoile de Casablanca in a 2–1 victory thanks to two goals of Mohamed Bhaija and Moussa Hanoun.

At the end of the 1959–60 season, which was interrupted by the 1960 Agadir earthquake, a major controversy broke out after the FRMF decided to organize playoffs between the leading trio which were tied on points, while Raja was in fact leading due to their better goal difference. The club protested against this decision deemed unfair and refused to take part in it, the playoff was thus played between Kénitra AC and AS FAR, which was actively supported by the Crown Prince Hassan II. KAC won the title and Raja finished third. Moussa Hanoun finished as Botola's top scorer with 22 goals, a club record. In the Throne Cup, the team exited from the semi-finals against Fath Union Sport, in the same scenario as the previous season (0–0; 2–3 in replay).

Raja finished fifth in 1960–61 and failed to reach the Throne Cup's quarter-final. The effects of the stolen title are still felt as the club had a modest 1961–62 campaign, finishing seventh and exiting from the Cup in the second round. On 1 November 1962 at 20 August 1955 Stadium of Algiers, Raja won the Ahmed Ben Bella Tournament after beating USM Algiers thanks to two goals from Bhaïja and Bahij (2–0). At the end of the 1962–63 season, they finished third and were eliminated from the Throne Cup's quarter-final. The following season, the Eagles finished ninth and reached the semi-final of the Cup for the third time, but lost the replay against Wydad (0–1) after the first fixture ended in a 0–0 draw.

== Peaks and troughs (1964–73) ==
=== First finals ===
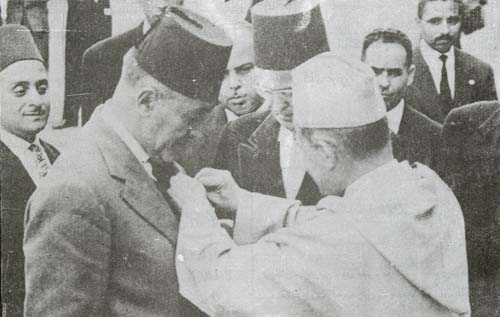
Père Jégo, always with his tarboosh, is decorated here by King Mohammed V as a Raja coach

First Throne Cup final
KAC Marrakech 3–1 Raja CA
13 June 1965, Stade Mohammed V (Attendance: 25000)

The 1964–65 season saw Raja reach their first Throne Cup final, a silver lining to a league campaign that saw them drop to an unprecedented twelfth place. On 13 June 1965, Raja faced Kawkab Marrakech without their star playmaker Hamid Bahij, who sat out due to a dispute with the board. They ultimately fell to a 3–1 defeat, with Mohamed Bhaïja netting their only goal. To reach the final, they knocked out arch-rivals Wydad 2–1 before edging past Raja Beni Mellal 1–0 in the semi-finals. They notably played the final with Inter Milan jerseys offered by Helenio Herrera, the famous Catenaccio manager who started his football career in Casablanca and appreciated the club.

The mid-1960s witnessed the rise of a golden generation from the club's academy, featuring some of Raja's greatest-ever icons, including Ali Aliouate, Mohamed Bénini, his cousin Mustapha Petchou, Azzeddine Abderrafi, Hamza Bourezgui, P'tit Omar, Saïd Ghandi and Houmane Jarir. In 1965–66, the Raja-Wydad rivalry took its full extent as the two sides competed in an intense season-long title battle.

Raja finished third in the 1966–67 Botola, which had reverted to its 16-team format, but saw their Cup run halted by Racing AC in the quarter-finals. Houmane Jarir finished top scorer of the league with 18 goals. The following year, during the 1967–68 campaign, Raja replicated their third-place ranking, this time in a 18 team-season. In their ongoing pursuit of a first major title, they fell short in the Throne Cup final on 14 July 1968, losing to Racing AC (1–0).

=== Bad form ===
In 1968–69, Raja endured the worst league campaign in their history, finishing thirteenth three points clear of relegation. In the Throne Cup, they were defeated by RS Settat in the semi-final. The 1969–70 season was overshadowed by internal divisions that split the club into two factions: the founders, led by Boujemaâ Kadri, Laâchfoubi El Bouazzaoui and Karim Hajjaj, and a new generation of leaders, primarily lawyers, headed by Abdellatif Semlali, Abdelouahed Maâch and Mustapha Abied. Even the players were drawn into the dispute and were often compelled to side with one of the groups. The team managed somehow to finish third and to reach the Cup's quarter-finals. The lawyers ultimately consolidated their position, ending the division and restoring unity within the club. Raja placed eleventh in 1970–71 and tenth in 1971–72, alongside back-to-back second-round eliminations in the Throne Cup, indicating a difficult spell of form. They showed progress in 1972–73, finishing third, just three points behind the leaders, but once more exited the Cup in the second round.

== Throne Cup success (1973–83) ==
=== First trophies ===

First Throne Cup title
Raja CA 1–0 Maghreb AS
28 July 1974, Stade Mohammed V (Attendance: 25000)

The early 1970s saw the rise of a new talented generation headed by Abdelmajid Dolmy, Abdelmajid Hadry, Abdelhak Fethi, M'hamed Fakhir, Abdellatif Beggar, Mohamed Laârabi and Najib Mokhles. At the start of the 1973–74 season, Petchou set the record for the best start in the history of the Botola after he scored eight goals in the opening four matches, two against Kénitra AC, one against IZ Khemissat, two against Maghreb AS and three against MC Oujda. The title slipped away on the ultimate match, as Raja Beni Mellal were crowned champions. The 1974 Throne Cup final was held on 28 July at the Stade Mohammed V between Raja and Maghreb AS. Under the coaching of Mohamed Tibari and despite the suspension of Petchou, the Greens went on to win 1–0 thanks to a historic goal from Mohamed Lâarabi, earning their first major trophy. The title was celebrated with Mahjoub Ben Seddik, founder and historic leader of the Moroccan Workers' Union (UMT), by presenting the trophy to him in Ghbila prison, where he was being detained.

The following season, Raja again fell just short of the Botola title, finishing two points behind the champions despite scoring more goals than any other team. Their defense of the Throne Cup ended surprisingly in the first round. Petchou, considered one of the best players of Morocco's history, moved to Wydad in a very controversial transfer, due to disagreements with some board members. Despite this move, he was still attached to Raja and his former teammates; he used to get changed in the Oasis Complex before crossing the road to join Wydad's training sessions.

The 1975–76 campaign ended with another third-place finish and a semi-final exit in the Cup against Fath US. The next year, Raja still failed to do better than a third position, but reached the Throne Cup's final. On 17 July 1977, the Greens defeated Difaâ El Jadida 1–0 thanks to an Abdellatif Beggar late penalty that awarded them their second title. From 1972 to 1977, Raja finished five times in a row in the podium but could not win their long-awaited first Botola title.

=== Setbacks ===
During the next two seasons, the departure or the retirement of key players such as Mohamed Bénini, P'tit Omar, and Houmane Jarir hugely impacted the performances, leading to a tenth then ninth finishes and two successive eliminations from the Cup's first round in 1977–78 and 1978–79 seasons.

n 1978, during a Casablanca Derby at Stade Père Jégo, the referee sent off Raja goalkeeper Najib Mokhles in the 83rd minute after a controversial challenge on Mustapha Chahid and awarded Wydad a penalty with the score level at 1–1. With all substitutions already used, Dolmy unexpectedly volunteered to replace Mokhles in goal. When a Wydad player attempted to hand him a red jersey, Mhamed Fakhir interpreted the gesture as a provocation. The players refused to resume play, and the match was abandoned. Few days later, the FRMF sanctioned them with a 1–0 loss, thus ending an eleven-match unbeaten run, an absolute Derby record.

In 1979–80, Raja finished eighth. In the Cup's quarter-final, an initial draw against Fath US forced the two teams to a replay, which ultimately favored the opponents (2–1). The 1980–81 season is the only edition in Botola's history that was played with 20 teams. Raja concludes this season with a third place and an early exit from the Throne Cup against Maghreb de Fès.

=== Back-to-back finals and African debut ===
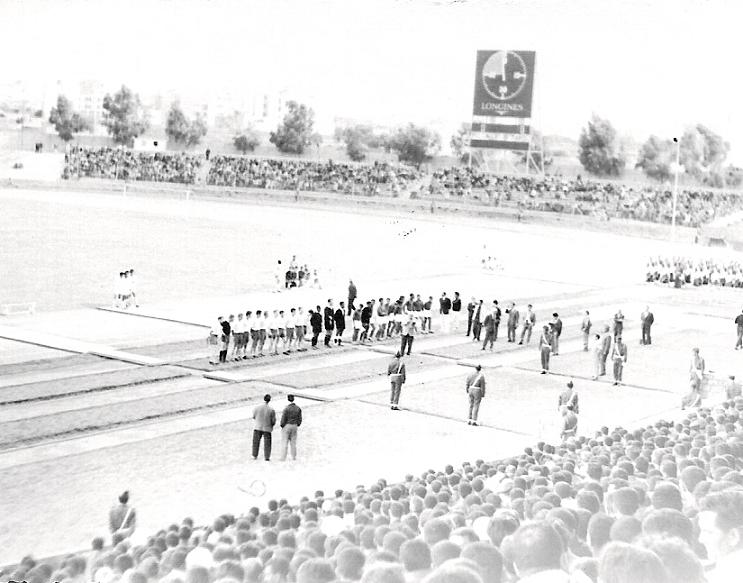
Stade Mohammed V before it was renovated and renamed in 1983 (pictured here in 1961)

A new generation of talented players emerged in the early 1980s, laying the foundations for the club's first golden era. Among them were Mustapha El Haddaoui, Hassan Mouahid, Mohamed Nejmi, Saïd Seddiki, Mehdi Mellouk, Redouane Hajry and Abderrahim Hamraoui. On 26 November 1980, Raja played a friendly against Southampton FC led by Ballon d'Or holder Kevin Keegan. Abdelhak Fethi opened the score before Charlie George scored the equalizer (1–1). In 1980–81, Raja finished third, then fifth in 1981–82, but the Eagles did not come out empty-handed this season. On 14 March 1982, the Throne Cup final pitted Raja against RS Kénitra. Beggar once again scored the winner, bringing Raja their third major trophy.

This season also witnessed the club's first appearance on the African football, when they faced AS Police in the first round of the African Cup Winners' Cup. After losing 1–0 in Senegal, they failed to make up for this delay in the second leg (0–0). Raja's lack of experience in continental competitions proved costly, resulting in a first-round elimination.

In 1982–83, Raja finished fifth and reached the Cup final for the second time in a row, this time against Olympique de Casablanca. The final took place on 21 August 1983 in the newly renamed Stade Mohammed V (for the 1983 Mediterranean Games). Raja lost the title 5–4 on penalties, after an 1–1 draw.

== First Botola and African Cup titles (1983–90) ==
=== Irregularity ===
The 1983–84 season was marked by a third-place finish and an elimination from the Throne Cup's quarter-finals against RC Oued Zem. A sixth-place finish in the league and elimination in the round of 16 of the Throne Cup wrapped-up a modest 1984–85 season.

On 6 December 1984, the board and players convened an extraordinary general assembly, which resulted in the dismissal of president Abdellah Ferdaous and the appointment of Houcine Sebbar as an interim. On 11 December at the Bourgogne Sports Center, Abdelkader Retnani was elected president. Raja finished as runners-up in 1985–86, two points behind Wydad. However, they were eliminated from the Cup's round of 16 by AS FAR (2–0). That year also witnessed the Morocco's historic campaign at the 1986 FIFA World Cup. Captained by Abdelmajid Dolmy, they became the first African team to reach the second round, where they were eliminated by West Germany following a late goal from Lothar Matthäus. Dolmy was particularly impressive against England, earning a 9/10 rating from L'Équipe.

Raja finished the 1986–87 season in fifth place in the playoffs after finishing third in their group. This year, Taoufik Bertal scored Raja's 1000th goal in the league against Amal Club Belksiri.

=== Continental triumph ===
At the beginning of the 1980s, the public authorities and the FRMF established the sponsorship system which offered clubs the possibility of getting financial support from large public companies such as ODEP, OCP, Banque Populaire, Comanav or Royal Air Maroc. Unlike sponsorship, clubs are not required to advertise their sponsors. In 1987, ODEP became the club's sponsor for 3 million dirhams per year, and the recruitment of numerous players at the end of their careers. Their director Mohamed Hassad led the negotiations and later joined Abdelkader Retnani's committee. This sponsorship has since been strengthened and renewed over the seasons, and continued by Marsa Maroc.

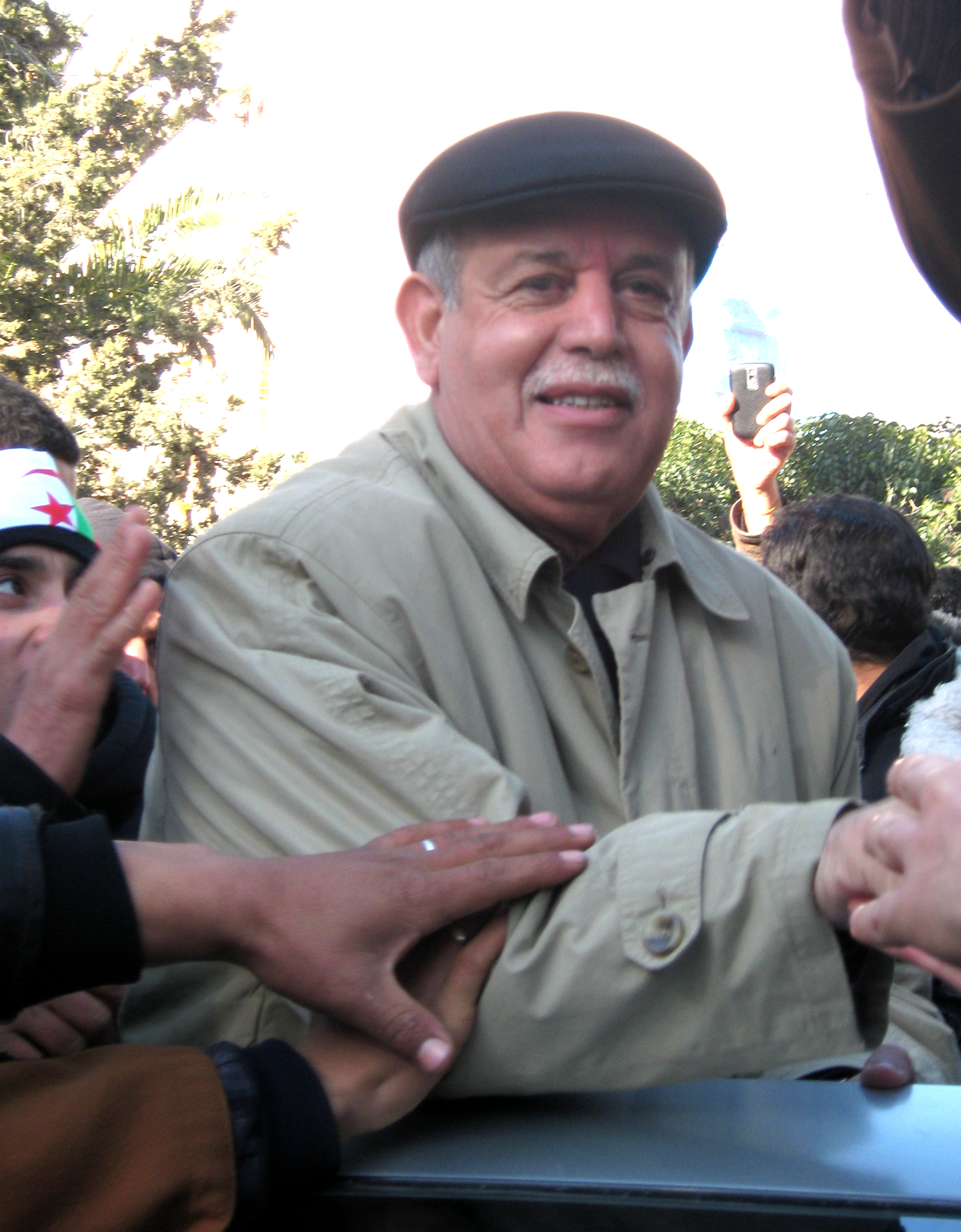
Rabah Saâdane, winner of the 1989 African Cup of Champions Clubs

The 1987 summer transfer window was very hectic, many key players arrived; Salif Diagne, Faouzi Kadmiri, Abdelghani Zerraf, Saïd Aït Salah, Fathi Jamal, Bouazza Ouldmou, and others moved out; Abdellatif Beggar, Mohamed Fennani and Redouane Hajry. In June 1987, Raja took part in an Arab competition for the first time, the 1987 Arab Champions Cup. With a revamped squad, Raja was eliminated after a defeat to ES Sahel and a draw against JS Kabylie.

In August 1987, after his preparation summer camp, Raja defeated Norwich City FC 4–0, who just finished fifth in the English league, thanks to goals from Taoufik Bertal, Bouazza Ouldmou, Abdeljalil El Bouchari, and an own goal. This match was Fernando Cabrita's debut with and the last for Abdelmajid Dolmy before joining Olympique de Casablanca, after 17 years at the club. Fouad Filali, president of ONA, who own the club, paid a record fee of 400,000 dirhams to complete this transfer.

On 17 July 1988, Raja defeated US Sidi Kacem on the penultimate day thanks to a historic goal from Abderrahim Hamraoui (0–1), winning their first-ever league title. Raja thus earned the right to play in the 1989 African Cup of Champions Clubs. In February 1989, Cabrita was replaced by Rabah Saâdane. In the summer of 1989, despite finishing ninth and being eliminated early from the Throne Cup, Saâdane remained in his position and defeated Interclub Brazzaville (2–1 agg) and Tonnerre Yaoundé in the semi–finals (0–1 agg). On 15 December 1989, Raja CA won the trophy after beating MC Oran on penalties after a 1–1 draw. The Greens thus managed to win this competition in their first appearance.

In May 1990, Mhamed Fakhir replaced Rabah Saâdane on interim until the end of the season. Raja finished fifth and were eliminated in the Cup by AS FAR. As the defending champions, they competed in the 1990 African Cup of Champions Clubs. After defeating Mighty Barrolle, Raja were drawn against RC Bafoussam in the second round. In light of Cameroon's participation in the 1990 FIFA World Cup, Raja agreed to postpone the tie. Following the tournament, CAF rescheduled the match for 25 July, a date that conflicted with the club's schedule. Raja consequently refused to travel to Cameroon. On 5 August, Raja were disqualified and the Cameroonians advanced to the next round.
