= History of Raja CA =

The history of Raja Club Athleric is divided into two periods:

- History of Raja CA (1949–1990) – The club was founded on 20 March 1949 in Derb Sultan by some Moroccan nationalists who regarded football as a way of resistance. Raja joined the Moroccan League in 1950 and, after progressing through the divisions, secured promotion to the inaugural Botola season in 1956–57. After the 1959–60 denied title and two lost Throne Cup finals, the club won its first major trophies in 1974 and 1977, followed by five consecutive top-three league finishes without winning it. In 1988, they won their first league title under Fernando Cabrita, before claiming the 1989 African Cup of Champions Clubs with Rabah Saâdane.
- History of Raja CA (1990–present) – Raja dominated Moroccan and African football during the 1990s and early 2000s, winning six consecutive league titles and many continental trophies, and became the first African team to reach the FIFA Club World Cup in 2000. Despite sporting instability in the following years, they won several titles. In 2012, they secured a domestic double and reached the Club World Cup final, before financial difficulties undermined its progress. Raja overcame this crisis and enjoyed a historic 2023–24 season, completing an unbeaten league campaign and securing its third double.

For a season-by-season account of the club's history, see List of Raja CA seasons.
