= Abdelmajid Dolmy =

Moroccan footballer (1953–2017)

Personal information
- Date of birth: 20 August 1953
- Place of birth: Casablanca, Morocco
- Date of death: 27 July 2017 (aged 63)
- Place of death: Casablanca, Morocco
- Height: 1.68 m (5 ft 6 in)
- Position: Midfielder

Youth career
- 1969–1971: Raja CA

Senior career*
Years	Team	Apps	(Gls)
1971–1987	Raja CA	670	(13)
1987–1990	CO Casablanca	72	(5)
1990–1991	Raja CA	18	(2)
Total		760	(20)

International career
1971–1973	Morocco U20		
1973–1988	Morocco	76	(5)
Medal record
Representing Morocco
Africa Cup of Nations
Winner	1976 Ethiopia
Third place	1980 Nigeria
- * Club domestic league appearances and goals

Abdelmajid Dolmy (Arabic: عبد المجيد الظلمي; 20 August 1953 – 27 July 2017) was a Moroccan professional footballer who played as a libero then as a central midfielder for Raja CA and the Moroccan national team. Nicknamed Maestro, he is widely considered one of the best players in the history of Moroccan and African football.

He started playing football in Derb sultan and joined the Raja-Oasis Complex in 1969 aged 16. Two years later, he joined the first team where he made a few appearances before establishing himself as a key player in 1973. He won the Throne Cup in 1974, 1977 and 1982, and came close to winning Botola many times. In 1987, Olympique de Casablanca signed him for a then Moroccan record transfer fee. In 1990, he returned to Raja and retired the next year at the age of 38.

With the Atlas Lions, he made his debut with the U20 national team in 1971. In 1973, he was called up to the senior team for a friendly match against Senegal, but did not play. On 23 February 1975, he made his debut under Gheorghe Mărdărescu against Libya in the qualifiers for the 1976 Summer Olympics. He played all games in the 1976 African Cup of Nations won by Morocco. He also won the gold medal at the 1983 Mediterranean Games. He played in three more AFCON and in the 1984 Summer Olympics. At the 1986 World Cup, he was a key player of the first African team to finish top of a World Cup group and the first African team to reach the knockout stages, before being eliminated by West Germany after a last-minute goal. He was one of the best Moroccan players of the tournament and was rated 9/10 by L'Équipe against England. He retired from international football after the 1988 AFCON.

In 1992, UNESCO awarded him the Fair play prize, to reward a “player whose exemplary morality and courtesy make him unanimously considered by his partners or adversaries as a football ambassador”. In 2006, Dolmy was selected by the Confederation of African Football (CAF) as one of the best 200 African football players of the last 50 years. In 2022, he's part of the IFFHS all-time Morocco Dream Team.

== Early life ==
Dolmy was born on 20 August 1953 in the popular district of Derb Fokara, in Derb Sultan, Casablanca. He began playing football as a forward in “Terrain Chili”, in the Hermitage district. In 1969, his performances left no one indifferent until the day when Mohamed Rahimi more known as Youaari, famous kit man of Raja Club Athletic and Petchou discovered his talent. A few days later, Dolmy signed his first contract with Raja at the age of 16.

== Club career ==
=== Debut ===
He was called up to the first team for the first time by Pál Orosz during the 1971–72 season for a Botola match against Raja Beni Mellal. He made his professional debut the next season against Hassania Agadir, entering in the second half as a libero. He made his starting debut against Maghreb Fès at the Stade Mohammed V. Raja finished the season in third position.

=== Raja CA legend ===
His performances ensured him a starting place in Mohamed Tibari's team despite his young age, alongside great names such as Petchou, Houmane Jarir or Saïd Ghandi.

He scored his first goal against Tihad Athletic Sport in the 1973–74 season which Raja finished in second position behind Raja Beni Mellal.

On 28 July 1974 at Stade Mohammed V, the 1973–74 Throne Cup final was played between Raja who had beaten Wydad AC on penalties, and Maghreb de Fès who had previously eliminated Mouloudia Oujda. Thanks to the goal of Mohamed El Arabi, Raja won the title. Dolmy is thus part of this generation which lifted the first trophy of the club's history.

On 17 July 1977, Raja traveled to the FUS Stadium to play the 1976–77 Throne Cup final against Difaâ Hassani El Jadidi. They won the title for the second time thanks to a penalty from Abdellatif Beggar.

In 1978, during the Casablanca Derby in the Père Jégo Stadium, Raja goalkeeper Najib Mokhles was sent off in the 83rd minute following a very controversial contact with Mustapha Chahid while the score showed a 1–1 draw. Surprisingly, Dolmy volunteers to replace him. One of the Wydad players tried to give him a red jersey, a gesture that M'hamed Fakhir saw as a humiliation. Dolmy's teammates no longer wanted to continue the match, the latter was stopped and the penalty whistled was not shot. A few days later, FRMF declared Wydad the winner with a score of 1–0, thus ending an invincibility period maintained by Raja for 11 matches since 1973, a record.

In 1980–81, Raja finished third in the league, then fifth in 1981–82, however, the team did not come out empty-handed this season. On 14 March 1982 at the Roches Noirs Stadium in Casablanca, Raja played the 1981–82 Throne Cup final against RS Kénitra. Like 1977, Abdellatif Beggar scored the only goal of the match from the penalty spot, and offered Raja their third title of the competition.

In 1982–83, Raja reached the Throne Cup final for the second time in a row to face Olympique de Casablanca. The final took place on 21 August 1983 in the Stade Mohammed V, Raja lost on penalties after a 1–1 draw.

This season will also witness Dolmy's first appearance in African club competitions, more precisely in the African Cup Winners' Cup, when Raja faced ASF Police in the first round. They lost 1–0 in Senegal and were unable to recover in the second leg that ended in a draw (0–0).

In 1985–86, Raja finished a season-long title battle as runners-up to Wydad by two points. On the other hand, they were eliminated in the domestic cup by AS FAR in the round of 16 (2–0). The 1986–87 season ended with a fifth position in the play-offs after finishing third of their group.

=== Transfer to CO Casablanca ===
In the summer of 1987, Dolmy was transferred to Olympique de Casablanca. Fouad Filali, president of the COC at the time, also president of the ONA, had to pay the sum of 400,000 dirhams, a record transfer at the time. Paradoxically, during his three-year spell in his new club, Raja won their first Botola title after 39 years and the 1989 African Cup of Clubs beating MC Oran in the final.

=== Return to Raja and retirement ===
In June 1990, it was announced that Dolmy was returning to Raja CA. He came back to much excitement from fans.

In the 1990–91 season at Stade Mohammed V, he scored his last goal from the penalty spot against the US Sidi Kacem before the Ghanaian Koffi scored a brace (3–0).

In the summer of 1991, after a prolific career of nearly 750 matches played during 20 seasons, Dolmy retired from football at the age of 38.

On 15 October 1992, before Raja's match against FUS (1–0 win, goal of Mohamed Oustad), UNESCO awarded Dolmy the Fair play prize, to reward a “player whose exemplary morality and courtesy make him unanimously considered by his partners or opponents as a football ambassador”. Dolmy has played more than 750 matches without getting a red card.

== International career ==
In 1971, Dolmy was called-up for the first time with the U20 national team. In 1973, he was called up to the senior national team for a friendly match against Senegal on 17 February 1973 without playing. On 26 February 1975, he made his senior debut under Gheorghe Mărdărescu against Libya in the qualifiers for the 1976 Montreal Summer Olympics (2–1 win). In September 1979, he played in the 1979 Mediterranean Games.

The Moroccan squad travelled to Ethiopia for its second participation in the African Cup of Nations. During this edition, CAF applied a new formula which qualifies the first two teams from groups A and B for the final group. Morocco then began the competition on 1 March and scored a draw against Sudan, before triumphing against Zaire thanks to an Abdelâali Zahraoui winner in the 80th minute. Then comes the decisive match against the leader Nigeria. Despite conceding an early goal, the Moroccans managed to win 3–1 and gain qualification for the next round. Dolmy established himself as an indispensable element within Gheorghe Mărdărescu's system by playing all the games. In the final phase, Morocco won in its first match over Egypt, then double African champion, thanks to a late goal from Abdelâali Zahraoui (2–1). In the second round, the Moroccans face Nigeria again. And like their previous match, it was Nigeria who opened the scoring before Ahmed Faras and Redouane Guezzar scored two goals. On 14 March 1976, they needed a win to be crowned champions as they face Guinea in the final match. But the final quickly turned to the advantage of the Guineans who scored the opener, before Ahmed Makrouh equalizes with a long shot in the 86th minute, offering the Atlas Lions their first continental title.

Morocco did not qualify for either the 1982 AFCON or the 1984 AFCON. Dolmy took part in the 1984 Los Angeles Summer Olympics and the 1986 AFCON, where the Moroccans finished in fourth place, beaten 3–2 by Ivory Coast. After a first participation in the 1970 World Cup in Mexico ended with an elimination in the first round, the Moroccans coached by José Faria qualified again for the 1986 World Cup, in Mexico again. Led by players like Aziz Bouderbala, Merry Krimau, Mohamed Timoumi and Dolmy, Morocco becomes the first African country to qualify from the first round of a World Cup, after two draws against Poland and England (Dolmy was rated 9/10 by L'Équipe in that match), and a 3–1 win against Portugal. In the round of 16, they lost 1–0 to West Germany after an 89th-minute Lothar Matthäus winner. Dolmy played every minute of the tournament.

Two years later, the Moroccan team presented itself at the 1988 African Cup of Nations as a host country with high expectations. After winning the first round, they were eliminated in the semifinals by Cameroon and finished in fourth place after losing the consolation final to Algeria (1–1 after extra time and 4–3 after the penalty shoot-out). After the competition, Dolmy retired from international football.

== Death ==
On 27 July 2017, Dolmy suffered cardiac arrest and passed away. His relatives said he did not suffer from any serious illness and was even preparing to go on Hajj.

His sudden death caused great emotion; several thousands expressed their sorrow on social media for the death of one of the most beloved athletes in the country's history. Several Moroccan and foreign personalities expressed their support to the Dolmy family.

=== Tributes ===
On 4 January 2021, the prefecture of Hay Hassani announced that an avenue in the Nassim Islane district had been renamed Avenue Abdelmajid Dolmy. The Abdelmajid Dolmy Stadium located in Derb Sultan is named after him, it is used by Raja CA women's team.

== Style of play and legacy ==
Dolmy started his career as a right-back then as a libero despite his relatively small height, but repositioned himself over the years in the midfield thanks to his great technical abilities. He was usually deployed in the role of a deep-lying playmaker, due to his vision and passing accuracy.

He also had great defensive skills; he directed the game, secured his partners and ensured ball recovery, and therefore helped his team to dominate the midfield. He was also known for dribbling after he recovered the ball, he's most favorite dribble being the nutmeg. For these reasons, Dolmy was given the nickname Maestro. Despite all the fame, he was known for being so humble and shy that he did not do any interviews throughout his career.

In 2006, Dolmy was selected by the Confederation of African Football (CAF) as one of the best 200 African football players of the last 50 years, and by the IFFHS in the all-time Morocco Dream Team in 2022.

== Honours ==
Raja CA

- Throne Cup: 1974, 1977, 1982; runner-up 1983
- Botola Pro runner-up: 1974, 1986

Morocco

- Africa Cup of Nations: 1976
- Mediterranean Games: 1983

Individual

- CAF best 200 African football players of the last 50 years (2006)
- IFFHS All-time Morocco Men's Dream Team
