= 1978–79 Moroccan Throne Cup =

Tournament details
- Country: Morocco

Final positions
- Champions: Wydad Athletic Club

The 1978–79 season of the Moroccan Throne Cup was the 23rd edition of the competition.

Wydad Athletic Club won the cup, beating Chabab Mohammédia 2–1 in the final, played at the stade Mohammed V in Casablanca. Wydad Athletic Club won the cup for the third time in their history.

== Tournament ==
=== Last 16 ===
Team 1	Team 2	Result
Renaissance de Settat	Fath Union Sport	0–1
KAC Kénitra	Nejm Shabab Bidawi	1–0
Mouloudia Club d'Oujda	Moghreb de Tetouan	2–1
AS Salé	FAR de Rabat	2–1
Union de Touarga	Chabab Mohammédia	1–2
Union de Mohammédia	Olympique de Boujniba	2–1
Raja de Beni Mellal	Ittihad Riadi Fkih Ben Salah	1–2
Wydad Athletic Club	CODM Meknès	2–1

=== Quarter-finals ===
Team 1	Team 2	Result
Chabab Mohammédia	AS Salé	3–1
Union de Mohammédia	Ittihad Riadi Fkih Ben Salah	1–0
KAC Kénitra	Fath Union Sport	0–0; 1–2 (pens)
Wydad Athletic Club	Mouloudia Club d'Oujda	0–0; 4–3 (pens)

=== Semi-finals ===
Team 1	Team 2	Result
Wydad Athletic Club	Fath Union Sport	2–1
Chabab Mohammédia	Union de Mohammédia	1–0

=== Final ===
The final took place between the two winning semi-finalists, Wydad Athletic Club and Chabab Mohammédia, on 9 September 1979 at the Stade Mohammed V in Casablanca.

1978–79 Moroccan Throne Cup
9 September 1979
Final

Wydad Athletic Club	2–1	Chabab Mohammédia
	Report

Stade Mohammed V, Casablanca
Attendance: 70000
Referee: Baba Laouissi
