= 1980–81 Moroccan Throne Cup =

Tournament details
- Country: Morocco

Final positions
- Champions: Wydad Athletic Club

The 1980–81 season of the Moroccan Throne Cup was the 25th edition of the competition.

Wydad Athletic Club won the cup, beating CODM Meknès 2–1 in the final, played at the Prince Moulay Abdellah Stadium in Rabat. Wydad Athletic Club won the title for the fourth time in their history.

== Tournament ==
=== Last 16 ===
Team 1	Team 2	Result
Wydad Athletic Club	Chabab Mohammédia	1–0
Maghreb de Fès	Raja Club Athletic	1–0
Mouloudia Club d'Oujda	CODM Meknès	0–1
Renaissance de Berkane	Moghreb de Tetouan	0–1
Fath Union Sport	Renaissance de Settat	0–1
Jeunesse Kénitra	Nejm Shabab Bidawi	0–2
Difaâ Hassani El Jadidi	Olympic Club de Safi	1–2
Ittihad Riadi Fkih Ben Salah	Olympique de Khouribga	4–2

=== Quarter-finals ===
Team 1	Team 2	Result
Wydad Athletic Club	Renaissance de Settat	2–0
CODM Meknès	Moghreb de Tetouan	4–0
Maghreb de Fès	Ittihad Riadi Fkih Ben Salah	1–2
Nejm Shabab Bidawi	Olympic Club de Safi	2–1

=== Semi-finals ===
Team 1	Team 2	Result
Nejm Shabab Bidawi	CODM Meknès	0–1
Wydad Athletic Club	Ittihad Riadi Fkih Ben Salah	4–0

=== Final ===
The final was played between the two winning semi-finalists, Wydad Athletic Club and CODM Meknès, on 16 September 1980 at the Prince Moulay Abdellah Stadium in Rabat.

1980–81 Moroccan Throne Cup
16 September 1980
Final

Wydad Athletic Club	2–1	CODM Meknès
	Report

Prince Moulay Abdellah Stadium, Rabat
Referee: Mohamed Hajjane
