= 2016–17 Raja CA season =

Raja CA
2016–17 season
- President: Said Hasbane
- Manager: Mohamed Fakhir
- Stadium: Stade Mohamed V (from 3 April 2017)
- Botola: 3rd
- Moroccan Throne Cup: Round of 32
- Top goalscorer: League: Issam Erraki (10 goals); All: Issam Erraki (10 goals)
- Biggest win: 4–0 v Kénitra AC (Home, 28 August 2016, Botola) v Moghreb Tetouan (Home, 29 April 2017, Botola)
Home colours

The 2016–17 season is Raja CA's 67rd season in existence and the club's 59th consecutive season in the top flight of Moroccan football. They are competing in Botola and the Throne Cup. It was the first season since

For the majority of the season, the club's matches were played either at Adrar Stadium, Marrakesh Stadium or Prince Moulay Abdellah Stadium until the reopening of Stade Mohammed V on 3 April 2017.

Raja CA kicked off the season with 1–1 draw against Difaâ El Jadidi in the first round of the Throne Cup.

== Squad list ==
Players and squad numbers last updated on 31 January 2017.
Note: Flags indicate national team as has been defined under FIFA eligibility rules. Players may hold more than one non-FIFA nationality.

No.	Name	Nat.	Position	Date of Birth (Age)	Signed from
Goalkeepers
1	Anas Zniti	(Morocco)	GK	28 October 1988 (aged 27)	(Morocco) AS FAR
88	Mohamed Bouamira	(Morocco)	GK	21 August 1988 (aged 27)	(Morocco) Chabab Rif Hoceima
32	Hicham El Allouch	(Morocco)	GK	20 October 1985 (aged 30)	(Morocco) Olympique Khourbiga
Defenders
3	Zakaria El Hachimi	(Morocco)	RB	4 August 1987 (aged 28)	(Morocco) Union Mohammedia
5	Jawad El Yamiq	(Morocco)	CB	29 February 1992 (aged 24)	(Morocco) Olympique Khourbiga
6	Mohamed Taouss	(Morocco)	CB	25 January 1987 (aged 29)	(Morocco) Hassania Agadir
13	Badr Benoun	(Morocco)	CB	30 September 1993 (aged 22)	(Morocco) Youth system
16	Mohamed Oulhaj	(Morocco)	CB	6 January 1988 (aged 28)	(Morocco) Youth system
20	Abdeljalil Jbira	(Morocco)	LB	14 March 1990 (aged 26)	(Morocco) Kawkab Marrakech
21	Adil Kerrouchy	(Morocco)	LB	23 November 1982 (aged 33)	(Morocco) Difaâ El Jadidi
25	Omar Boutayeb	(Morocco)	RB	19 April 1994 (aged 22)	(Morocco) Youth system
Midfielders
7	Walid Sabbar	(Morocco)	CM	25 February 1996 (aged 20)	(Morocco) Youth system
8	Saad Lamti	(Morocco)	CM	16 March 1990 (aged 26)	(Morocco) Olympique Safi
10	Samson Mbingui	(Gabon)	AM	9 February 1992 (aged 24)	(Algeria) NA Hussein Dey
14	Lema Mabidi	(Democratic Republic of the Congo)	CM	11 June 1993 (aged 23)	(Tunisia) CS Sfaxien
18	Abdelilah Hafidi	(Morocco)	AM/LW	30 January 1992 (aged 24)	(Morocco) Youth system
99	Issam Erraki	(Morocco)	CM	5 January 1981 (aged 35)	(United Arab Emirates) Emirates Club
Forwards
7	Youssef Kaddioui	(Morocco)	LW/AM	28 September 1984 (aged 31)	(United Arab Emirates) Al Dhafra
9	Mohamed Bouldini	(Morocco)	ST	27 November 1995 (aged 20)	(Morocco) Rachad Bernoussi
11	Zouheir El Ouassli	(Morocco)	LW	11 August 1993 (aged 22)	(Morocco) Tihad AS
24	Mahmoud Benhalib	(Morocco)	LW	23 March 1996 (aged 20)	(Morocco) Youth system
27	Omar Mansouri	(Morocco)	RW	14 May 1991 (aged 25)	(Morocco) Ittihad Tanger
28	Youssef Anouar	(Morocco)	LW	4 July 1990 (aged 25)	(Morocco) AS FAR
29	Johan Lengoualama	(Gabon)	ST	29 September 1992 (aged 23)	(Portugal) Famalicão
77	Hilaire Momi	(Central African Republic)	ST	16 March 1990 (aged 26)	(Belgium) Sint-Truidense V.V.
93	Abdelkbir El Ouadi	(Morocco)	LW	20 February 1993 (aged 23)	(Morocco) Wydad Fes

== Transfers ==
=== In ===
Date	Pos	Player	Moving from	Transfer fee	Source
3 July 2016	MF	(Morocco) Saad Lamti	Olympique Safi	Undisclosed	
15 July 2016	DF	(Morocco) Mohamed Taouss	Hassania Agadir	Free agent	
19 August 2016	DF	(Morocco) Jawad El Yamiq	Olympique Khourbiga	€323 k	
25 August 2016	AM	(Morocco) Achraf Zahir	Maghreb Fes	Undisclosed	
29 August 2016	FW	(Gabon) Mario Bernard Mandrault	(Gabon) AS Pélican	Undisclosed	
13 September 2016	AM	(Gabon) Samson Mbingui	(Algeria) NA Hussein Dey	Free agent	
19 September 2016	FW	(Gabon) Johan Lengoualama	(Portugal) Famalicão	Undisclosed	
17 January 2017	FW	(Morocco) Omar Mansouri	Ittihad Tanger	Free agent	
17 January 2017	FW	(Central African Republic) Hilaire Momi	(Belgium) Sint-Truidense V.V.	Free agent	
21 January 2017	GK	(Morocco) Mohamed Bouamira	Chabab Rif Hoceima	Free agent	

=== Out ===
Date	Pos	Player	Moving to	Transfer fee	Source
10 June 2016	FW	(Nigeria) Michel Babatunde	Qatar SC	€1.1 m	
1 July 2016	AM	(Belgium) Mohamed Messoudi	(Belgium) KFCO Beerschot	End of contract	
1 July 2016	FW	(Ghana) Mohamed Yakubu	-	Released	
1 July 2016	FW	(Morocco) Hamza Iajour	Youssoufia Berrechid	Undisclosed	
25 July 2016	MF	(Morocco) Ahmed Jahouh	Fath Union Sport	€180 k	
2 August 2016	MF	(Morocco) Soufiane Gadoum	Ittihad Tanger	€45 k	
9 August 2016	DF	(Ghana) Mohamed Awal	Arsenal Toula	Released	
30 August 2016	FW	(Nigeria) Christian Osaguona	(Belgium) KV Mechelen	Released	
1 September 2016	FW	(Morocco) Yassine Salhi	Moghreb Tetouan	End of contract	
6 November 2016	FW	(Gabon) Mario Bernard Mandrault	-	Released	
1 January 2017	DF	(Morocco) Hamza Toumi	Youssoufia Berrechid	Undisclosed	
19 January 2017	DF	(Morocco) Mustapha Belmkadem	Chabab Rif Hoceima	Undisclosed	
23 January 2017	GK	(Morocco) Mohamed Boujad	RC Oued Zem	Undisclosed	
28 February 2017	FW	(Ivory Coast) Moussa Bakayoko	(Armenia) Shirak Gyumri	Undisclosed	

=== Loans in ===
Date	Pos	Player	Moving From	Fee	Source
19 January 2017	FW	(Morocco) Youssef Anouar	AS FAR	Swap deal (with El Ouadi)	

=== Loans out ===
Date	Pos	Player	Moving to	Fee	Source
30 June 2016	MF	(Morocco) Anas Soudani	Kawkab Marrakesh	-	
30 June 2016	MF	(Morocco) Soufiane Saadane	Youssoufia Berrechid	-	
4 July 2016	FW	(Morocco) Nawfel Zerhouni	RC Oued Zem	-	
30 August 2016	MF	(Morocco) Omar Arjoune	Youssoufia Berrechid	-	
19 January 2017	FW	(Morocco) Abdelkabir El Ouadi	AS FAR	Swap deal (with Anouar)	

== Pre-season ==
=== Ntifi tournament ===
16 August 2016 Semi-final	Olympique Khouribga	0–1	Raja CA	Casablanca
17:00			Erraki 45' (pen.)	Stadium: Stade Père-Jégo

18 August 2016 Final	Racing AC	1–3	Raja CA	Casablanca
17:00	El Kaabi 40' (pen.)	Report	Benhalib 2', 20'; Lamti 26'	Stadium: Stade Père-Jégo

=== Friendlies ===
Date	Opponents	Venue	Result	Scorers
3 August 2016	Ittihad Tanger	Stade Ibn Batouta	0–1	
9 September 2016	USM Aït Melloul	Aït Melloul Stadium	3–0	Hafidi Erraki
7 October 2016	JS Kasbah Tadla	Raja-Oasis Complex	3–0	Bouldini Lamti
11 November 2016	Raja Beni Mellal	Raja-Oasis Complex	2–2	Oulhaj 4' Karrouchy 65'
16 January 2017	Kawkab Marrakech	Raja-Oasis Complex	3–1	Sabbar (pen.) Jbira El Ouadi
19 January 2017	Étoile de Casablanca	Raja-Oasis Complex	1–0	El Mansouri
21 January 2017	Olympique Khouribga	Raja-Oasis Complex	3–1	El Mansouri 23' Momi 75' Bouldini 89'
14 February 2017	Étoile de Casablanca	Raja-Oasis Complex	2–1	El Mansouri Anouar
17 March 2017	Tihad sportif de Salé	Raja-Oasis Complex	2–0	Anouar 52' Mbingui 59'

== Competitions ==
=== Overview ===
Competition	First match	Last match	Starting round	Final position	Record							
Competition	First match	Last match	Starting round	Final position	Pld	W	D	L	GF	GA	GD	Win %
Botola	28 August 2016	26 May 2017	Matchday 1	3rd	30	15	12	3	42	17	+25	50.00
Throne Cup	12 June 2016	19 June 2016	Round of 32	Semi-finals	2	0	2	0	3	3	+0	0.00
Total					32	15	14	3	45	20	+25	46.88

Last updated: 26 May 2017
Source: Sofascore

=== Botola ===
==== League table ====
Pos	Team	Pld	W	D	L	GF	GA	GD	Pts	Qualification or relegation
1	Wydad AC (C)	30	19	9	2	50	24	+26	66	Qualification to the CAF Champions League
2	Difaâ El Jadidi	30	16	11	3	45	23	+22	59	Qualification to the CAF Champions League
3	Raja CA	30	15	12	3	42	17	+25	57	Qualification to the CAF Confederation Cup
4	RS Berkane	30	14	9	7	30	16	+14	51	Qualification to the CAF Confederation Cup
5	IR Tanger	30	12	9	9	33	25	+8	45	
6	AS FAR	30	11	11	8	42	39	+3	44	
7	FUS Rabat	30	11	7	12	32	32	0	40	invited to the Arab Club Champions Cup (Note: Wydad Casablanca and Raja Casablanca are also invited to the Arab Club Champions Cup.)
8	Hassania Agadir	30	10	8	12	32	40	−8	38	
9	Olympique Safi	30	10	6	14	25	32	−7	36	
10	Chabab Atlas Khénifra	30	7	13	10	25	24	+1	34	
11	Olympique Khouribga	30	10	4	16	34	40	−6	34	
12	Moghreb Tétouan	30	9	7	14	30	37	−7	34	
13	Kawkab Marrakesh	30	9	6	15	36	42	−6	33	
14	Chabab Rif Al Hoceima	30	8	7	15	26	46	−20	31	
15	JS de Kasbah Tadla (R)	30	7	7	16	25	47	−22	28	Relegation to Botola 2
16	KAC Kénitra (R)	30	5	8	17	27	50	−23	23	Relegation to Botola 2

Updated to match(es) played on 13 June 2017. Source: scoresway.com
Rules for classification: 1) points; 2) goal difference; 3) number of goals scored.
(C) Champions; (R) Relegated

==== Results summary ====
Overall								Home						Away					
Pld	W	D	L	GF	GA	GD	Pts	W	D	L	GF	GA	GD	W	D	L	GF	GA	GD
30	15	12	3	42	17	+25	57	10	3	2	26	7	+19	5	9	1	16	10	+6

Last updated: 26 May 2017.
Source: Competitive matches

==== Results by round ====
Round	1	2	3	4	5	6	7	8	9	10	11	12	13	14	15	16	17	18	19	20	21	22	23	24	25	26	27	28	29	30
Ground	H	A	A	A	H	A	H	A	H	A	H	H	A	H	A	A	H	H	A	H	A	H	A	H	A	H	A	H	A	H
Result	W	W	D	D	W	D	W	D	D	W	L	D	W	D	D	W	W	W	W	W	D	W	D	L	L	W	D	W	D	W
Position	3	1	1	4	4	4	4	4	4	4	3	4	4	3	4	4	3	3	3	2	2	2	1	2	2	5	5	5	5	5

Updated to match(es) played on 26 May 2017. Source: Competitive matches
A = Away; H = Home; W = Win; D = Draw; L = Loss

==== Matches ====
Date	Opponents	Venue	Result	Scorers	Report
28 August 2016	Kénitra AC	H	4–0	Erraki 29' (pen.) Benhalib 33', 36' El Ouadi 83'	
18 September 2016	JS Kasbah Tadla	A	2–0	Benhalib 14' Lamti 34'	
25 September 2016	CA Khenifra	A	1–1	Erraki 35' (pen.)	
16 October 2016	Hassania Agadir	A	2–2	Hafidi 41' El Ouasli 49'	
23 October 2016	Olympique Safi	H	1–0	El Ouasli 89'	
30 October 2016	Fath Union Sport	A	2–2	Benhalib 52' Oulhaj 70'	
3 November 2016	Kawkab Marrakech	H	2–1	Chagou 13' (o.g.) Erraki 75'	
20 November 2016	Olympique Khouribga	A	0–0		
27 November 2016	Wydad AC	H	0–0		
3 December 2016	Moghreb Tétouan	A	1–0	Mabidi 75'	
7 December 2016	Ittihad Tanger	H	0–1		
12 December 2016	RS Berkane	H	1–1	Erraki 48' (pen.)	
17 December 2016	Chabab Rif Hoceima	A	2–1	Mbingui 31' Erraki 90' (pen.)	
23 December 2016	AS FAR	H	1–1	Mbingui 61'	
31 December 2016	Difaâ El Jadidi	A	0–0		
4 February 2017	Kénitra AC	A	2–0	Momi 79', 90+3'	
12 February 2017	JS Kasbah Tadla	H	3–0	Karrouchy 23' Momi 74' Anouar 90+2'	
17 February 2017	CA Khenifra	H	1–0	Hafidi 80'	
25 February 2017	Ittihad Tanger	A	2–1	El Mansouri 66' Mabidi 80'	
3 March 2017	Hassania Agadir	H	1–0	El Mansouri 48'	
12 March 2017	Olympique Safi	A	0–0		
5 April 2017	Fath Union Sport	H	2–0	Erraki 5' (pen.) El Ouasli 13'	
11 April 2017	Kawkab Marrakech	A	0–0		
15 April 2017	Olympique Khouribga	H	0–1		
23 April 2017	Wydad AC	A	0–1		
29 April 2017	Moghreb Tétouan	H	4–0	Erraki 28' (pen.), 72' Benhalib 45', 85'	
7 May 2017	RS Berkane	A	1–1	Erraki 69'	
14 May 2017	Chabab Rif Hoceima	H	2–1	Hafidi 56' Erraki 70' (pen.)	
21 May 2017	AS FAR	A	1–1	Mbingui 89'	
26 May 2017	Difaâ El Jadidi	H	4–1	Jbira 31' Benhalib 59' Hafidi 78' Momi 90+4'	

=== Throne Cup ===
==== Round of 32 ====
12 June 2016 First leg	Difaâ Hassani El Jadidi	1–1	Raja CA	El Jadida
18:00	Bemammer 87'		Benhalib 16'	Stadium: Ben M'Hamed El Abdi Stadium

19 June 2016 Second leg	Raja CA	2–2	Difaâ Hassani El Jadidi	Casablanca
16:00	Ouattara 5'; Azaro 89'	Report	Hafidi 48', 64'	Stadium: Stade Père-Jégo
Note: Difaâ was awarded a 3–0 win because Raja refused to continue the match in protest against the referee

== Squad information ==
=== Goals ===
Includes all competitive matches. The list is sorted alphabetically by surname when total goals are equal.

Rank	Pos.	Player	Botola	Throne Cup	Total
1	MF	(Morocco) Issam Erraki	10	0	10
2	FW	(Morocco) Mahmoud Benhalib	7	1	8
3	AM	(Morocco) Abdelilah Hafidi	4	2	6
4	FW	(Central African Republic) Hilaire Momi	4	0	4
5	FW	(Morocco) Zouheir El Ouasli	3	0	3
6	AM	(Gabon) Samson Mbingui	3	0	3
7	FW	(Morocco) Omar El Mansouri	2	0	2
8	MF	(Democratic Republic of the Congo) Lema Mabidi	2	0	2
9	FW	(Morocco) Youssef Anouar	1	0	1
10	FW	(Morocco) Abdelkabir El Ouadi	1	0	1
11	MF	(Morocco) Saad Lamti	1	0	1
12	DF	(Morocco) Mohamed Oulhaj	1	0	1
13	DF	(Morocco) Adil Karrouchy	1	0	1
14	DF	(Morocco) Abdeljalil Jbira	1	0	1
Own goals			1	0	1
Total			42	3	45

=== Assists ===
Rank	Pos.	Player	Botola	Throne Cup	Total
1	AM	(Morocco) Abdelilah Hafidi	7	0	7
2	FW	(Morocco) Mahmoud Benhalib	4	0	4
3	DF	(Morocco) Abdeljalil Jbira	4	0	4
4	FW	(Morocco) Zouheir El Ouasli	0	2	2
5	MF	(Morocco) Saad Lamti	2	0	2
6	MF	(Morocco) Issam Erraki	1	0	1
7	DF	(Morocco) Zakaria El Hachimi	2	0	1
8	DF	(Morocco) Jawad El Yamiq	1	0	1
9	AM	(Gabon) Samson Mbingui	1	0	1
10	FW	(Central African Republic) Hilaire Momi	1	0	1
11	DF	(Morocco) Badr Benoun	1	0	1
12	FW	(Morocco) Youssef Anouar	1	0	1
