= 1976–77 Moroccan Throne Cup =

Tournament details
- Country: Morocco

Final positions
- Champions: Raja Club Athletic

The 1976–77 season of the Moroccan Throne Cup was the 21st edition of the competition.

Raja Club Athletic won the cup, beating Difaâ Hassani El Jadidi 1–0 in the final, played at the Stade de FUS in Rabat. Raja Club Athletic won the cup for the second time in their history.

== Tournament ==
=== Last 16 ===
| Team 1 | Team 2 | Result |
|---|---|---|
| Wydad Athletic Club | Jeunesse Kénitra | 2–0 |
| Chabab Mohammédia | Wydad de Fès | 1–0 |
| Ittihad Khemisset | Renaissance de Settat | 1–1; 1–3 (pens) |
| Kawkab Marrakech | Maghreb de Fès | 5–0 |
| Union de Touarga | Mouloudia Club d'Oujda | 1–1; 2–4 (pens) |
| Ittihad Riadi Fkih Ben Salah | Nejm Shabab Bidawi | 0–1 |
| Amal Belksiri | Difaâ Hassani El Jadidi | 1–2 |
| Raja Club Athletic | Fath Union Sport | 1–0 |

=== Quarter-finals ===
| Team 1 | Team 2 | Result |
|---|---|---|
| Wydad Athletic Club | Mouloudia Club d'Oujda | 1–3 |
| Chabab Mohammédia | Nejm Shabab Bidawi | 2–1 |
| Difaâ Hassani El Jadidi | Kawkab Marrakech | 2–1 |
| Raja Club Athletic | Renaissance de Settat | 1–0 |

=== Semi-finals ===
| Team 1 | Team 2 | Result |
|---|---|---|
| Raja Club Athletic | Mouloudia Club d'Oujda | 3–2 |
| Difaâ Hassani El Jadidi | Chabab Mohammédia | 3–0 |

=== Final ===
The final took place between the two winning semi-finalists, Raja Club Athletic and Difaâ Hassani El Jadidi, on 17 July 1977 at the Stade de FUS in Rabat.

1976–77 Moroccan Throne Cup
17 July 1977
Final

| Raja Club Athletic | 1–0 | Difaâ Hassani El Jadidi |
|---|---|---|
| | Report |

Stade de FUS, Rabat
Referee: Mohamed Bahou
