= 1979–80 Moroccan Throne Cup =

Tournament details
- Country: Morocco

Final positions
- Champions: Maghreb de Fès

The 1979–80 season of the Moroccan Throne Cup was the 24th edition of the competition.

Maghreb de Fès won the cup, beating Union de Sidi Kacem 1–0 in the final, played at the stade Roches Noires in Casablanca. Maghreb de Fès won the title for the first time in their history.

== Tournament ==
=== Last 16 ===
Team 1	Team 2	Result
Union de Touarga	Difaâ Hassani El Jadidi	2–3
Ittihad Riadi Fkih Ben Salah	Union Sportive Ksima Meskina Inezgane	1–0
Union de Mohammédia	RAPC Casablanca	2–1
Mouloudia de Marrakech	Mouloudia Club d'Oujda	1–0
Union de Sidi Kacem	FAR de Rabat	1–0
Amal Belksiri	Fath Union Sport	0–2
Raja Club Athletic	AS Salé	3–0
Maghreb de Fès	Wydad Athletic Club	1–0

=== Quarter-finals ===
Team 1	Team 2	Result
Fath Union Sport	Raja Club Athletic	2–1
Union de Sidi Kacem	Union de Mohammédia	1–0
Maghreb de Fès	Difaâ Hassani El Jadidi	3–1
Mouloudia de Marrakech	Union Sportive Ksima Meskina Inezgane	3–1

=== Semi-finals ===
Team 1	Team 2	Result
Maghreb de Fès	Fath Union Sport	1–0
Union de Sidi Kacem	Mouloudia de Marrakech	2–1

=== Final ===
The final took place between the two winning semi-finalists, Maghreb de Fès and Union de Sidi Kacem, on 18 July 1980 at the Stade Roches Noires in Casablanca.

1979–80 Moroccan Throne Cup
18 July 1980
Final

Maghreb de Fès	1–0	Union de Sidi Kacem
Hamid Khourrag	Report

Stade Roches Noires, Casablanca
Referee: Mohamed Larache
