= 1988–89 Moroccan Throne Cup =

Tournament details
- Country: Morocco

Final positions
- Champions: Wydad Athletic Club

The 1988–89 season of the Moroccan Throne Cup was the 33rd edition of the competition.

Wydad Athletic Club won the competition, beating Olympique de Khouribga 2–0 in the final, played at the Prince Moulay Abdellah Stadium in Rabat. Wydad Athletic Club won the cup for the 5th time in their history.

== Competition ==
=== Last 16 ===
Team 1	Team 2	Result
Maghreb de Fès	Olympique de Casablanca	0–1
Renaissance de Settat	Kamal Marrakech	?–?
Difaâ Hassani El Jadidi	Ittihad Tanger	2–1
Wydad de Fès	Najah Souss	2–0
Hilal de Nador	FAR de Rabat	0–1
Fath Union Sport	Kawkab Marrakech	2–3
Union de Sidi Kacem	Olympique de Khouribga	1–2
Wydad Athletic Club	CODM Meknès	2–1

=== Quarter-finals ===
Team 1	Team 2	Result
Difaâ Hassani El Jadidi	FAR de Rabat	?–?
Wydad Athletic Club	Kawkab Marrakech	1–0
Olympique de Khouribga	Olympique de Casablanca	1–0
Kamal Marrakech	Wydad de Fès	1–1; 3–4 (pens)

=== Semi-finals ===
Team 1	Team 2	Result
Wydad Athletic Club	FAR de Rabat	3–2
Wydad de Fès	Olympique de Khouribga	0–1

=== Final ===
The final took place between the two winning semi-finalists, Wydad Athletic Club and Olympique de Khouribga, on 6 March 1989 at the Prince Moulay Abdellah Stadium in Rabat.

6 March 1989
1988–89 Moroccan Throne Cupe final

Wydad Athletic Club	2–0	Olympique de Khouribga
	Report

Prince Moulay Abdellah Stadium, Rabat
Referee: Mohamed Jayed
