= 1969–70 Moroccan Throne Cup =

Tournament details
- Country: Morocco

Final positions
- Champions: Wydad Athletic Club

The 1969–70 season of the Moroccan Throne Cup was the 14th edition of the competition.

Wydad Athletic Club won the cup, beating Renaissance de Settat 1–0 in the final, played at the Stade d'honneur in Casablanca. Wydad Athletic Club won the cup for the first time in their history.

== Competition ==
=== Last 16 ===
Team 1	Team 2	Result
Kawkab Marrakech	Chabab Mohammédia	0–2
KAC Kénitra	Renaissance de Tanger	2–0
Racing de Casablanca	Mouloudia Club d'Oujda	0 – 2
FAR de Rabat	Renaissance de Settat	0–1
Union de Sidi Kacem	Maghreb de Fès	0–1
Olympic Club de Safi	Difaâ Hassani El Jadidi	1–3
Raja Club Athletic	AS Salé	4–1
Wydad Athletic Club	Hassania d'Agadir	1–0

=== Quarter-finals ===
Team 1	Team 2	Result
Renaissance de Settat	Mouloudia Club d'Oujda	2–1
Maghreb de Fès	KAC Kénitra	1 – 0
Wydad Athletic Club	Difaâ Hassani El Jadidi	3–1
Raja Club Athletic	Chabab Mohammédia	0–1

=== Semi-finals ===
Team 1	Team 2	Result
Wydad Athletic Club	Maghreb de Fès	1 – 0
Renaissance de Settat	Chabab Mohammédia	1–0

=== Final ===
The final was played between the two winning semi-finalists, Wydad Athletic Club and Renaissance de Settat, on 12 July 1970 at the Stade d'honneur in Casablanca.

Moroccan Throne Cup
12 July 1970
Final

Wydad Athletic Club	1–0	Renaissance de Settat

Stade d'honneur, Casablanca
Referee: Charaf Abdekebir
