= 1973–74 Moroccan Throne Cup =

Tournament details
- Country: Morocco

Final positions
- Champions: Raja Club Athletic

The 1973–74 season of the Moroccan Throne Cup was the 18th edition of the competition.

Raja Club Athletic won the cup, beating Maghreb de Fès 1–0 in the final, played at the Stade d'honneur in Casablanca. Raja Club Athletic won the tournament for the first time in their history.

Raja Club Athletic also won the first title in their history.

== Competition ==
=== Last 16 ===
Team 1	Team 2	Result
Raja Club Athletic	Raja d'Agadir	5–2
Wydad Athletic Club	Renaissance de Settat	1–0
CODM Meknès	Difaâ Hassani El Jadidi	0–1
Chabab Mohammédia	Maghreb de Fès	0–1
KAC Kénitra	TAS de Casablanca	2–1
Fath Union Sport	Hassania de Sidi Slimane	0–1
Amal Club de Belksiri	Union de Sidi Kacem	0–4
Mouloudia Club d'Oujda	Étoile de Casablanca	4–0

=== Quarter-finals ===
Team 1	Team 2	Result
Raja Club Athletic	Hassania de Sidi Slimane	5–0
Maghreb de Fès	Difaâ Hassani El Jadidi	1–0
KAC Kénitra	Wydad Athletic Club	0–1
Mouloudia Club d'Oujda	Union de Sidi Kacem	... -...

=== Semi-finals ===
Team 1	Team 2	Result
Maghreb de Fès	Mouloudia Club d'Oujda	2–2; 5–2 (pens)
Raja Club Athletic	Wydad Athletic Club	1–1; 4–3 (pens)

=== Final ===
The final took place between the two winning semi-finalists, Raja Club Athletic and Maghreb de Fès, on 28 July 1974 at the Stade d'honneur in Casablanca.

1973–74 Moroccan Throne Cup
28 July 1974
Final

Raja Club Athletic	1–0	Maghreb de Fès
	Report

Referee: Abdelkrim Ziani
