= 1967–68 Moroccan Throne Cup =

Tournament details
- Country: Morocco

Final positions
- Champions: Racing de Casablanca

The 1967–68 season of the Moroccan Throne Cup was the 12th edition of the competition.

Racing de Casablanca won the cup, beating Raja de Casablanca 1–0 in the final, played at the Stade d'honneur in Casablanca. Racing de Casablanca won the title for the first time in their history. It was also the first final to be a derby, where both clubs come from the same city.

== Tournament ==
=== Last 16 ===
Team 1	Team 2	Result
Wydad Athletic Club	FAR de Rabat	1–1; 7–8 (pens)
Racing de Casablanca	Moghreb de Tetouan	2 – 1
Stade Marocain	Maghreb de Fès	1–0
Renaissance de Berkane	Mouloudia Club d'Oujda	0–2
TAS de Casablanca	Union de Sidi Kacem	1–1; 4 – 2 (pens)
Raja Club Athletic	Raja de Beni Mellal	2–0
KAC Kénitra	Renaissance de Settat	2–4
Chabab Mohammédia	Difaâ Hassani El Jadidi	2–0

=== Quarter-finals ===
Team 1	Team 2	Result
Raja Club Athletic	Stade Marocain	3–2
Renaissance de Settat	FAR de Rabat	2–0
Mouloudia Club d'Oujda	Racing de Casablanca	1–2
TAS de Casablanca	Chabab Mohammédia	0–1

=== Semi-finals ===
Team 1	Team 2	Result
Renaissance de Settat	Racing de Casablanca	0–1
Chabab Mohammédia	Raja Club Athletic	0–1

=== Final ===
The final took place between the two winning semi-finalists, Racing de Casablanca and Raja de Casablanca, on 14 July 1968 at the Stade d'honneur in Casablanca.

Moroccan Throne Cup
14 July 1968
Final

Racing de Casablanca	1–0	Raja de Casablanca
	Report

Stade d'honneur, Casablanca
Referee: Driss Bourzgi
