= 1974–75 Moroccan Throne Cup =

Tournament details
- Country: Morocco

Final positions
- Champions: Chabab Mohammédia

The 1974–75 season of the Moroccan Throne Cup was the 19th edition of the competition.

Chabab Mohammédia won the cup, beating Union de Sidi Kacem 2–0 in the final, played at the Stade d'honneur in Casablanca. Chabab Mohammédia won the competition for the first time in their history.

== Competition ==
=== Last 16 ===
Team 1	Team 2	Result
Ittihad Khemisset	Moghreb de Tetouan	3–1
Union de Sidi Kacem	Raja d'Agadir	2–1
Tihad Sportif Casablanca	Mouloudia Club d'Oujda	0–1
Tihad de Safi	Olympique de Boujniba	0–1
Football Club de Casablanca	Fath Union Sport	1–4
Club de Chemin de Fer de Meknès	Ittihad Riadi Fkih Ben Salah	1–0
Maghreb de Fès	Difaâ Hassani El Jadidi	0–1
Chabab Mohammédia	Olympique de Khouribga	2–1

=== Quarter-finals ===
Team 1	Team 2	Result
Ittihad Khemisset	Club de Chemin de Fer de Meknès	0–0; 5–0 (pens)
Difaâ Hassani El Jadidi	Union de Sidi Kacem	0–1
Tihad de Safi	Fath Union Sport	0–1
Chabab Mohammédia	Mouloudia Club d'Oujda	0–0; 5–4 (pens)

=== Semi-finals ===
Team 1	Team 2	Result
Ittihad Khemisset	Union de Sidi Kacem	1–1; 2–3 (pens)
Chabab Mohammédia	Fath Union Sport	1–0

=== Final ===
The final took place between the two winning semi-finalists, Chabab Mohammédia and Union de Sidi Kacem, on the 6 July 1975 at the Stade d'honneur in Casablanca.

1974–75 Moroccan Throne Cup
6 July 1975
Final

Chabab Mohammédia	2–0	Union de Sidi Kacem
	Report

Stade d'honneur, Casablanca
Referee: M'hamed Hajjane
