= 1968–69 Moroccan Throne Cup =

Tournament details
- Country: Morocco

Final positions
- Champions: Renaissance de Settat

The 1968–69 season of the Moroccan Throne Cup was the 13th edition of the competition.

Renaissance de Settat won the cup, beating KAC Kénitra 2–1 in the final, played at the Stade d'honneur in Casablanca. Renaissance de Settat won the cup for the first time in their history.

== Tournament ==
=== Last 16 ===
Team 1	Team 2	Result
Renaissance de Settat	FAR de Rabat	3–2
TAS de Casablanca	Union de Sidi Kacem	2–3
Renaissance de Kénitra	Raja Club Athletic	1–2
Nejm Shabab Bidawi	Chabab Mohammédia	0–1
Fath Union Sport	Racing de Casablanca	2–1
KAC Kénitra	Union Sportive de Taza	5–0
Maghreb de Fès	Olympic Club de Safi	4–1
CODM Meknès	Mouloudia Club d'Oujda	0–1

=== Quarter-finals ===
Team 1	Team 2	Result
Renaissance de Settat	Mouloudia Club d'Oujda	1–0
KAC Kénitra	Chabab Mohammédia	1 – 0
Maghreb de Fès	Raja Club Athletic	0–1
Union de Sidi Kacem	Fath Union Sport	1 – 2

=== Semi-finals ===
Team 1	Team 2	Result
KAC Kénitra	Fath Union Sport	3–0
Renaissance de Settat	Raja Club Athletic	1–0

=== Final ===
The final took place between the two winning semi-finalists, Renaissance de Settat and KAC Kénitra, on 13 July 1968 at the Stade d'honneur in Casablanca.

Moroccan Throne Cup
13 July 1969
Final

Renaissance de Settat	2–1	KAC Kénitra

Stade d'honneur, Casablanca
Referee: Abdelkrim Ziani
