= 1972–73 Moroccan Throne Cup =

Tournament details
- Country: Morocco

Final positions
- Champions: Fath Union Sport

The 1972–73 season of the Moroccan Throne Cup is the 17th edition of the competition.

Fath Union Sport won the cup, beating Ittihad Khemisset 3–2 in the final, played for the first time at the Stade Al Inbiaâte in Agadir. Fath Union Sport won the competition for the second time in their history.

== Tournament ==
=== Last 16 ===
Team 1	Team 2	Result
Fath Union Sport	OCE de Casablanca	0–2
Union Sportive d'Inezgane	Club Athletic Youssoufia Berrechid	1–0
Chabab Atlas Khénifra	Olympique Youssoufia	0–1
Chabab Mohammédia	Renaissance de Berkane	5–0
Renaissance de Settat	Difaâ Hassani El Jadidi	1–1; 1–3 (pens)
Ittihad Khemisset	Raja Club Athletic	2–1
Kawkab Marrakech	Union de Sidi Kacem	1–1; 2–4 (pens)
Mouloudia Club d'Oujda	CODM Meknès	2–0

=== Quarter-finals ===
Team 1	Team 2	Result
Union Sportive d'Inezgane	Olympique Youssoufia	2–1
Fath Union Sport	Difaâ Hassani El Jadidi	1–0
Mouloudia Club d'Oujda	Union de Sidi Kacem	1–3
Ittihad Khemisset	Chabab Mohammédia	2–1

=== Semi-finals ===
Team 1	Team 2	Result
Wydad Athletic Club	Union de Sidi Kacem	3–2
Ittihad Khemisset	Union Sportive d'Inezgane	3–0

=== Final ===
The final took place between the two winning semi-finalists, Fath Union Sport and Ittihad Khemisset, on 22 July 1973 at the Stade Al Inbiaâte in Agadir.

1972–73 Moroccan Throne Cup
22 July 1973
Final

Fath Union Sport	3–2	Ittihad Khemisset
	Report

Stade Al Inbiaâte, Agadir
Referee: Mohamed Benali
