= 1964–65 Moroccan Throne Cup =

Tournament details
- Country: Morocco

Final positions
- Champions: Kawkab Marrakech (3rd title)
- Runners-up: Raja Club Athletic

The 1964–65 season of the Moroccan Throne Cup was the 9th edition of the competition.

The clubs in Division 1 only entered in the round of 16, while the teams from lower divisions had to play preliminary rounds. Teams played one-legged matches. In case of a draw, the match was replayed at the opponents' ground.

Kawkab Marrakech won the cup, beating Raja Club Athletic 3–1 in the final, played at the Stade d'honneur in Casablanca. Kawkab Marrakech won the cup for the third time, and the third time in a row. They also became the first Moroccan team to win the cup three times in a row.

== Tournament ==
The final took place between the two winning semi-finalists, Kawkab Marrakech and Raja Club Athletic, on 13 June 1965 at the Stade d'honneur in Casablanca. The match was refereed by Salih Mohamed Boukkili. It was the first final for Raja Club Athletic, while for KAC Marrakech, it was the fourth, and the third in a row. The club had won their first two cups in the previous two years. KAC Marrakech won the match 3–1, thanks to goals from Lachheb ( 46'), Chicha ( 87'), and Khaldi ( 89'), with Raja's sole reply being the opener from Bhaija. It was therefore the third consecutive title for Kawkab Marrakech in the competition, and the first defeat in the final for Raja.

== Sources ==
- Rsssf.com
