= 1966–67 Moroccan Throne Cup =

Tournament details
- Country: Morocco

Final positions
- Champions: Fath Union Sport

The 1966–67 season of the Moroccan Throne Cup was the 11th edition of the competition.

Fath Union Sport won the cup, beating Renaissance de Settat 2–1 in the final, played at Stade d'honneur in Casablanca. Fath Union Sport won the title for the first time in their history.

== Tournament ==
=== Round of 16 ===
Team 1	Team 2	Result
Raja Club Athletic	Racing de Casablanca	0–1
CODM Meknès	Chabab Mohammédia	2–1
Renaissance de Settat	Raja de Beni Mellal	2 – 0
Kawkab Marrakech	Wydad Athletic Club	0–2
KAC Kénitra	Hassania d'Agadir	0–1
FAR de Rabat	Maghreb de Fès	1–0
Stade Marocain	Mouloudia Club d'Oujda	1–0
Fath Union Sport	Difaâ Hassani El Jadidi	2–0

=== Quarter-finals ===
Team 1	Team 2	Result
Wydad Athletic Club	FAR de Rabat	0–1
CODM Meknès	Racing de Casablanca	0–1
Stade Marocain	Renaissance de Settat	0–1
Fath Union Sport	Hassania d'Agadir	1–0

=== Semi-finals ===
Team 1	Team 2	Result
Fath Union Sport	Racing de Casablanca	3 – 2
FAR de Rabat	Renaissance de Settat	0 – 2

=== Final ===
The final took place between the two winning semi-finalists, Fath Union Sport and Renaissance de Settat, on 28 May 1967 at the Stade d'honneur in Casablanca.

1966–67 Moroccan Throne Cup
28 May 1967
Final

Fath Union Sport	2–1	Renaissance de Settat

Stade d'honneur, Casablanca
Referee: Sabry el mostapha
