= 1959–60 Moroccan Throne Cup =

- Dates: 1959–60

Final positions
- Champions: Mouloudia Club d'Oujda (3rd title)
- Runners-up: Fath Union Sport

The 1959–60 season of the Moroccan Throne Cup was the fourth edition of the competition.

The teams played one-legged matches. In case of a draw, the matches were replayed at the opponents' stadium.

Mouloudia Club d'Oujda beat Fath Union Sport 1–0 in the final, played at the Stade d'honneur in Casablanca. Mouloudia Club d'Oujda won the cup for the third time in their history. Wydad Athletic Club won against Raja Club Athletic 6-0, a record win in the Casablanca Derby.

== Tournament ==
The final took place between the winners of the two semi-finals, Mouloudia Club d'Oujda and Fath Union Sport, on 24 April 1960 at the Stade d'honneur in Casablanca. The match was refereed by Salih Mohamed Boukkili. It was the fourth consecutive final for MC Oujda in the competition. MC Oujda won the competition for the third time in their history, thanks to a penalty by Madani ( 13' (pen.)).

The lineup for FUS was:

- FUS : Mohammed El Ayachi, Alami I, Samame, Houcine Kyoud, Ben Omar, Abderrazak, Alami II, Lacombe, Gharbaoui, Mohammed Tounsi, Mohammed Labsir.

== Sources ==
- Rsssf.com
