= 1956–57 Moroccan Division Nationale I =

Moroccan football league season

Division Nationale I
- Season: 1956–57
- Champions: Wydad Casablanca (6st title)
- Matches: 240
- Top goalscorer: Abdelkarim Zidani (21 goals)

The 1956-57 Division Nationale I is the first season of the Moroccan Premier League after the edition of the Moroccan Football League, Wydad Casablanca are the holders of the title.

== Participating teams ==
- Wydad Casablanca (WAC)
- Raja Casablanca (RCA)
- TAS Casablanca (TAS)
- Racing Casablanca (RAC)
- USM Casablanca (USM)
- FUS Rabat (FUS)
- Maghreb Fez (MAS)
- Kenitra AC (KAC)
- MC Oujda (MCO)
- Kawkab Marrakech (KACM)
- Moghreb Tétouan (MAT)
- Stade Marocain (SM)
- Difaâ Hassani El Jadidi (DHJ)
- AS Charaf Olympique Marocain (ASCOM)
- SCC Roches Noires (SCCRN)
- Quartier industriel (QI)
