= 1958–59 Moroccan Throne Cup =

Tournament details
- Country: Morocco
- Dates: 1958–59

Final positions
- Champions: FAR de Rabat (1st title)
- Runners-up: Mouloudia Club d'Oujda

The 1958–59 season of the Moroccan Throne Cup was the third edition of the competition.

The teams played a one-legged match. In case of a draw, the matches were replayed at the opponent's ground.

FAR de Rabat beat Mouloudia Club d'Oujda 1–0 in the final, played at the Stade d'honneur in Casablanca. FAR de Rabat won the competition for the first time in their history.

== Competition ==
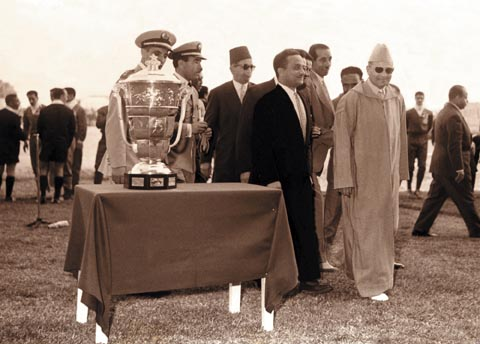
Mohammed V of Morocco and Mohamed Benjelloun Touimi are ready to present the trophy to the winners of the competition.

The final took place between the winners of the two semi-finals, FAR de Rabat and Mouloudia Club d'Oujda, on 16 November 1957 at the Stade d'honneur in Casablanca. The match was refereed by Abdelkrim Ziani. It was the third consecutive final for MC Oujda in the competition. FAR de Rabat won the competition for the first time in their history thanks to a goal from Houcine Zemmouri ( 18').

== Sources ==
- Rsssf.com
