= 1968–69 Moroccan Division Nationale I =

Moroccan football league season

Division Nationale I
- Season: 1968–69
- Champions: Wydad Casablanca (8th title)
- Top goalscorer: Ahmed Faras (16 goals)

The 1968–69 Division Nationale I is the 13th season of the Moroccan Premier League. Wydad Casablanca are the holders of the title.
