= 1962–63 Moroccan Division Nationale I =

Moroccan football league season

Division Nationale I
- Season: 1962–63
- Champions: FAR Rabat (3rd title)

The 1962–63 Division Nationale I is the 7th season of the Moroccan Premier League. FAR Rabat are the holders of the title.
