= 1960–61 Moroccan Throne Cup =

1960–1961 Moroccan Throne Cup

Tournament details
- Country: Morocco

Final positions
- Champions: KAC Kénitra (1st title)
- Runners-up: Wydad Athletic Club

The 1960–61 season of the Moroccan Throne Cup was the 5th edition of the competition.

From this season, after the last 16, the Royal Moroccan Football Federation introduced a system of home and away matches until the final in Casablanca. In case of a draw, the match was replayed at the opponents' ground.

KAC Kénitra beat Wydad Athletic Club 1–0 in the final, played at the Stade d'honneur in Casablanca. KAC Kénitra won the competition for the first time in their history.

== Competition ==
The final took place between the winners of the two semi-finals, Wydad AC and KAC Kénitra, at the Stade d'honneur in Casablanca. The match was refereed by Mohamed Meknassi. It was the first final for KAC Kénitra, unlike Wydad AC, who were playing their third. KAC Kénitra won the title thanks to a goal from Abdeslam ( 65'). It was their first win in the competition, while Wydad AC had their third consecutive final loss, having never won the competition.

== Sources ==
- Rsssf.com
