= 1960–61 Moroccan Division Nationale I =

Moroccan football league season

Division Nationale I
- Season: 1960–61
- Champions: FAR Rabat (1st title)

The 1960–61 Division Nationale I is the 5th season of the Moroccan Premier League. FAR Rabat are the holders of the title.
