= 1957–58 Moroccan Division Nationale I =

Moroccan football league season

Division Nationale I
- Season: 1957–58
- Champions: Kawkab Marrakech (1st title)
- Top goalscorer: Mohamed Chtaini (22 goals)

The 1957-58 Division Nationale I is 2nd season of the Moroccan Premier League. Kawkab Marrakech are the holders of the title.
