= 1961–62 Moroccan Throne Cup =

Tournament details
- Country: Morocco

Final positions
- Champions: Mouloudia Club d'Oujda (4th title)
- Runners-up: Kawkab Marrakech

The 1961–62 season of the Moroccan Throne Cup was the 6th edition of the competition.

The teams played one-legged matches. In case of a draw, a penalty shoot-out took place.

Mouloudia Club d'Oujda beat Kawkab Marrakech 1–0 in the final, played at the Stade d'honneur in Casablanca. MC Oujda won the title for the 4th time in their history.

== Competition ==
The final took place between the winners of the two semi-finals, Mouloudia Club d'Oujda and Kawkab Marrakech, on 20 May 1962 at the Stade d'honneur in Casablanca. The match was refereed by Abdelkrim Ziani. MC Oujda won the fourth title in 5 finals in the competition, winning 1–0 against KAC Marrakech, thanks to a goal from Kaddour ( 36').

== Sources ==
- Rsssf.com
