= 1969–70 Moroccan Division Nationale I =

Moroccan football league season

Division Nationale I
- Season: 1969–70
- Champions: FAR Rabat (7th title)

The 1969–70 Division Nationale I is the 14th season of the Moroccan Premier League. FAR Rabat are the holders of the title.
