= 1961–62 Moroccan Division Nationale I =

Moroccan football league season

Division Nationale I
- Season: 1961–62
- Champions: FAR Rabat (2nd title)

The 1961–62 Division Nationale I is the 6th season of the Moroccan Premier League. FAR Rabat are the holders of the title.
