= 1963–64 Moroccan Division Nationale I =

Moroccan football league season

Division Nationale I
- Season: 1963–64
- Champions: FAR Rabat (4th title)
- Top goalscorer: Robert Trava (23 goals)

The 1963–64 Division Nationale I is the 8th season of the Moroccan Premier League. FAR Rabat are the holders of the title.
