= 1975–76 Moroccan Throne Cup =

Final positions
- Champions: Fath Union Sport

The 1975–76 season of the Moroccan Throne Cup was the 20th edition of the competition.

Fath Union Sport won the competition, beating KAC Kénitra 1–0 in the final, played at the Stade de Marchan in Tanger. Fath Union Sport won the title for the third time in their history.

== Competition ==
=== Last 16 ===
Team 1	Team 2	Result
Fath Union Sport	Mouloudia Club d'Oujda	1–0
Union de Sidi Kacem	Wydad Athletic Club	1–0
Amal Club de Belksiri	Tihad Sportif Casablanca	0–2
Olympique de Boujniba	Hilal de Nador	3–2
KAC Kénitra	Olympique de Khouribga	3–2
Nejm Shabab Bidawi	Olympique Youssoufia	4–3
Difaâ Hassani El Jadidi	ASPC Casablanca	1–2
Moghreb de Tetouan	Raja Club Athletic	1–3

=== Quarter-finals ===
Team 1	Team 2	Result
Union de Sidi Kacem	ASPC Casablanca	1–0
Fath Union Sport	Tihad Sportif Casablanca	1–0
Nejm Shabab Bidawi	Raja Club Athletic	1–2
KAC Kénitra	Olympique de Boujniba	3–1

=== Semi-finals ===
Team 1	Team 2	Result
Fath Union Sport	Raja Club Athletic	3–1
KAC Kénitra	Union de Sidi Kacem	2–1

=== Final ===
The final took place between the two winning semi-finalists, Fath Union Sport and KAC Kénitra, on 18 July 1975 at the Stade de Marchan in Tanger.

1975–76 Moroccan Throne Cup
18 July 1976
Final

Fath Union Sport	1–0	KAC Kénitra
	Report

Stade de Marchan, Tanger
Referee: Abdelali Naciri
