= Mustapha Choukri =

Moroccan footballer

Personal information
- Full name: Mustapha Choukri
- Date of birth: 30 November 1944
- Place of birth: Casablanca, Morocco
- Date of death: 22 January 1980 (aged 35)
- Height: 1.84 m (6 ft 0 in)
- Position: Midfielder

Youth career
- 1956–1966: Raja CA

Senior career*
Years	Team	Apps	(Gls)
1966–1975	Raja CA		
1975–1979	Wydad AC		
1979–1980	Al-Wehda		

International career
1970–1979	Morocco	33	(8)
- * Club domestic league appearances and goals

Mustapha Choukri also spelled Mustafa Choukri nicknamed Petchou (1945 – 22 January 1980) was a Moroccan football midfielder who played for Morocco in the 1970 FIFA World Cup. He mainly played for Raja Club Athletic.
