= Said Ghandi =

Moroccan footballer (born 1948)

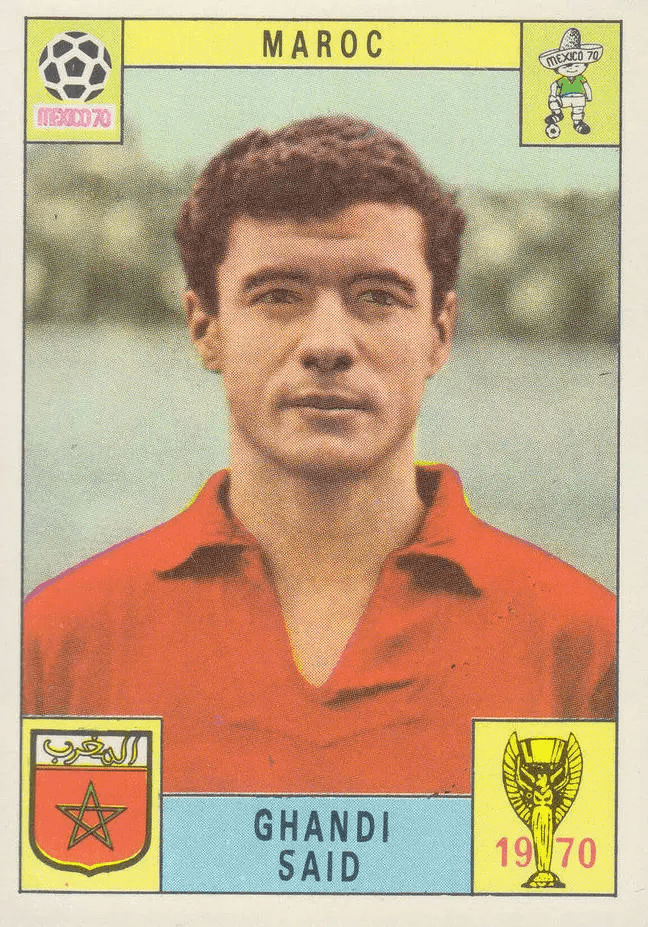
- Ghandi at the 1970 FIFA World Cup

Personal information
- Date of birth: 16 August 1948 (age 78)
- Place of birth: Casablanca, French Morocco
- Position: Forward

Senior career*
| Years | Team | Apps | (Gls) |
| 1964-1979 | Raja Casablanca | 300+ | (106) |

International career
| 1966-1968 | Morocco U23 | 6 | (2) |
| 1966-1974 | Morocco | 19 | (0) |
- * Club domestic league appearances and goals

Said Ghandi (born 16 August 1948) is a Moroccan football midfielder who played for the Morocco in the 1970 FIFA World Cup. He also played for Raja Casablanca from 1964 to 1979, scoring 118 goals in all competitions.
