= Houmane Jarir =

Moroccan footballer

Personal information
- Full name: Mohammed Houmane Jarir
- Date of birth: 30 November 1944
- Place of birth: Casablanca, Morocco
- Date of death: 19 May 2018 (aged 73)
- Position: Forward

Senior career*
Years	Team	Apps	(Gls)
1962–1977	Raja Casablanca		

International career
1966–1970	Morocco		

Managerial career
- Raja Casablanca
- * Club domestic league appearances and goals

Mohammed Houmane Jarir (30 November 1944 – 19 May 2018) was a Moroccan footballer who played as a forward. He played for the Moroccan national team in the 1970 FIFA World Cup, scoring in their opening match against West Germany. He spent his club career with Raja CA Casablanca before a knee injury ended it.

== International career ==
=== International goals ===
#	Date	Venue	Opponent	Score	Result	Competition
	13 June 1969	Marsailles, France	Tunisia	2–2	Draw	1970 FIFA World Cup qualification
	26 October 1969	Casablanca, Morocco	Sudan	3–0	Won	1970 FIFA World Cup qualification
	26 October 1969	Casablanca, Morocco	Sudan	3–0	Won	1970 FIFA World Cup qualification
	3 June 1970	Estadio Nou Camp, León	West Germany	1–2	Lost	1970 FIFA World Cup
Correct as of 6 January 2015
