= 1966–67 Moroccan Division Nationale I =

Moroccan football league season

Division Nationale I
- Season: 1966–67
- Champions: FAR Rabat (5th title)

The 1966–67 Division Nationale I is the 11th season of the Moroccan Premier League. FAR Rabat are the holders of the title.
