= 1959–60 Moroccan Division Nationale I =

Moroccan football league season

Division Nationale I
- Season: 1959–60
- Champions: KAC Kénitra (1st title)
- Top goalscorer: Moussa Hanoun (22 goals)

The 1959–60 Division Nationale I is the 4th season of the Moroccan Premier League. KAC Kénitra are the holders of the title.
