= 1958–59 Moroccan Division Nationale I =

Moroccan football league season

Division Nationale I
- Season: 1958–59
- Champions: Étoile de Casablanca (1st title)
- Top goalscorer: Mohamed Khalfi (21 goals)

The 1958–59 Division Nationale I is the 3rd season of the Moroccan Premier League. Étoile de Casablanca are the holders of the title.
