= 1967–68 Moroccan Division Nationale I =

Moroccan football league season

Division Nationale I
- Season: 1967–68
- Champions: FAR Rabat (6th title)

The 1967–68 Division Nationale I is the 12th season of the Moroccan Premier League. FAR Rabat are the holders of the title.
