= Derb Sultan =

Neighborhood of Casablanca, Morocco

Derb Sultan درب السلطان (Arabic)
- Location within Morocco Location within Africa
- Coordinates: 33°34′10″N 7°36′5″W
- Country: Morocco
- Region: Grand Casablanca
- Prefecture: Casablanca
- Established: 20 mars 1949
- Time zone: UTC+1 (CET)

Derb Sultan (Arabic: درب السلطان) is one of the largest and oldest neighborhoods in Casablanca. It is part of the prefecture of district Al Fida-Mers Sultan. It is known for being one of the cradles of colonial resistance against the French protectorate in Morocco. During the 1930s and 1940s, Derb Sultan knew a vast wave of migration coming from other Moroccan regions, especially the regions of Souss and Draa in the south.

This district is known to be the place where Moroccan unions were founded, on March 20 1949 in the small café of Ba'saleh, one of the most famous Arab and African clubs, the Raja Club Athletic.
