= IR Fkih Ben Salah =

Moroccan football club

IR Fquih Ben Salah
- Full name: Ittihad Riadi Fquih Ben Salah
- Founded: 1962
- Ground: Stade Municipal
- Capacity: 10,000
- League: Amateurs I South
- 2025–26: Amateurs II, 2nd of 16 (promoted via play-off)
Home colours	Away colours	Third colours

IR Fquih Ben Salah is a Moroccan football club based in Fquih Ben Salah. The club plays in Amateurs I (Moroccan Fourth Division).

== History ==
The club spent 4 seasons in the 1st division between 1980 and 1984.

=== Key dates ===
- 1962 : Creation of the club
- 1970 : Promoted to D2
- 1980 : Promoted to D1
- 1984 : Relegated to D2
- 2008 : Promoted to GNF2 (D2)
