= RS Settat =

Moroccan football club

- Full name: Renaissance Sportive Settat
- Founded: 1946; 80 years ago
- Stadium: Stade d'honneur de Settat
- Capacity: 10,000
- League: Amateurs II Northwest
- 2025-26: Amateurs II, 5th of 16
Home colours	Away colours

Renaissance Sportive Settat is a Moroccan football club located in Settat. Founded in 1946.

== Honours ==
- Botola Pro :
  - Champions : 1970–71
  - Runners-up (2): 1966–67, 1967–68
- Botola Pro 2 :
  - Champions : 1998–99
- Moroccan Throne Cup :
  - Winners : 1968–69
  - Runners-up (3): 1966–67, 1969–70, 1999–2000
- Maghreb Cup Winners Cup :
  - Winners : 1969–70

== Performance in CAF competitions ==
- CAF Cup: 1 appearance

1998 : Quarter-Finals
