= SCC Mohammédia =

Association football club in Morocco

Chabab Mohammédia
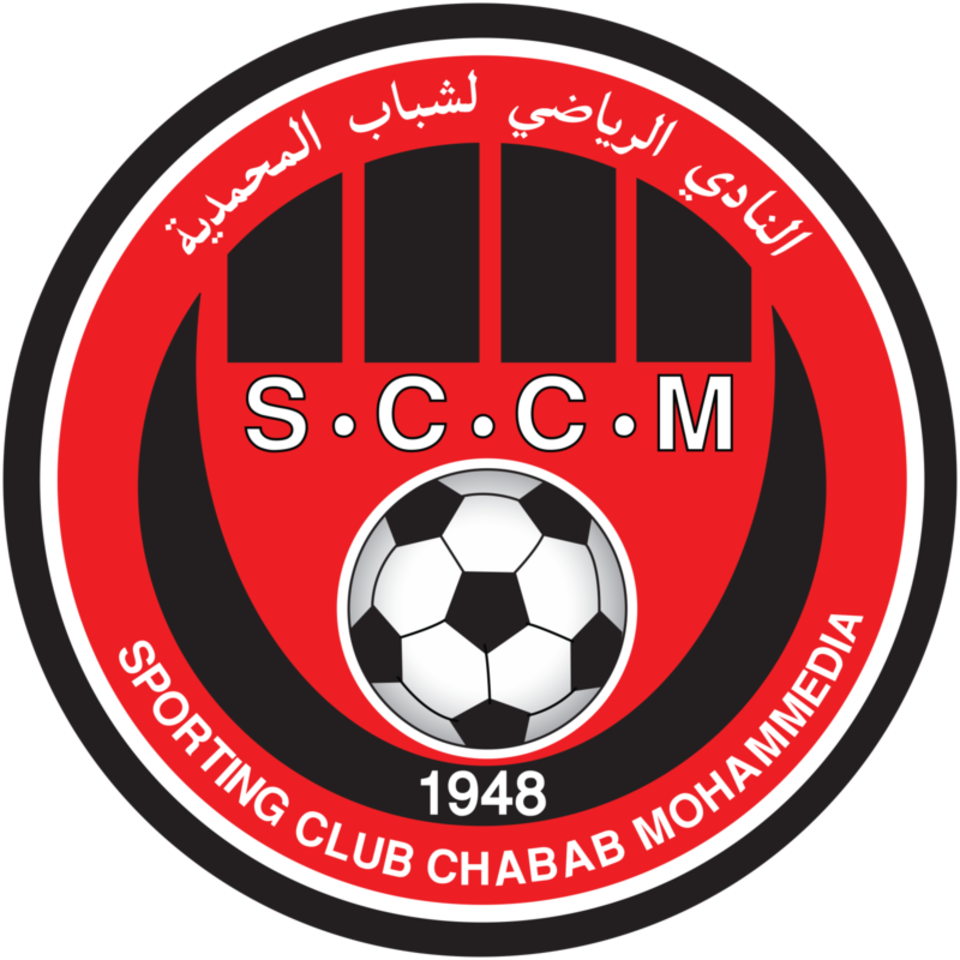
- Full name: Sporting Club Chabab Mohammedia
- Nicknames: Skakem (The dialectal pronunciation of the club's initials, with no exact meaning), "Fedaliens" ...
- Founded: 1948; 78 years ago (as Fedala Sport)
- Stadium: El Bachir Stadium
- Capacity: 10,000
- League: Botola Pro 2
- 2025–26: Botola Pro 2, 12th of 16
Home colours	Away colours	Third colours

Sporting Club Chabab Mohammédia (Arabic: النادي الرياضي شباب المحمدية, Arabic pronunciation: [annaːdiː arrijaːdˤiː ʃabaːbu-lmuħammadi j-jah]), also simply known as Chabab Mohammédia, is a Moroccan professional football club based in the city of Mohammedia, that competes in the Botola Pro 2, the second tier of the Moroccan football league system.

== History ==
The club was founded in 1948, being known as Fedala Sport The club played in the second division before achieving promotion to the first division of the Royal Football Federation in the 1959-60 season.

Chabab Mohammédia had its best period in the 1970s and 1980s. The club provided much of the players of the Moroccan national football team that won the 1976 African Cup of Nations.

The quest for their first championship title was carried out in 1980, after winning two Throne Cup titles, the Moroccan domestic cup in 1972 and 1975.

After playing in the Moroccan First Division in 2008–09, in the 2018–19 season Mohammedia was playing in the third division.

In January 2019 the club announced that Rivaldo was to join the club as technical director once promoted to the professional second league, and would become the club's head coach starting from the 2019–20 season. However, Marco Simone became the club's manager in July 2019, with Rivaldo being appointed as a counsellor.

== Stadium ==
Bachir Stadium, is the historical stadium of the club.

The stadium bore the name "Bachir" after Chabab Mohammedia's player during the 1950s and 1960s, Sir Abdessalam Bachir, a promising player who died in a tragic accident.

Bachir Stadium was shared with Union de Mohammédia who is now hosting its Amateur league matches in Alia Stadium, located in the eastern side of the city.

== Current squad ==
As of 14 January 2025

Note: Flags indicate national team as defined under FIFA eligibility rules; some limited exceptions apply. Players may hold more than one non-FIFA nationality.

No.	Pos.	Nation	Player
2	DF	MAR	Jaafar By
3	DF	MAR	Mouad Gari
4	DF	MAR	Zakaria Drouich
5	DF	MAR	Mohammed El Jadidi
6	MF	MAR	Mohammed Archidy
7	MF	MAR	Anas Boukram
8	MF	MAR	Taoufik Safsafi
9	FW	MAR	Abderrazak Ennakouss
11	FW	MAR	Ahmed Rhailouf
13	MF	MAR	Aymane Foutat
14	MF	MAR	Redouane Marmouch
16	FW	MAR	Zakaria Fatihi
18	MF	MAR	Mohammed Malik

No.	Pos.	Nation	Player
19	DF	MAR	Walid Nekaila
20	MF	MAR	Walid Sani
21	DF	MAR	Yasser Machouat
23	MF	MAR	Ahmed El Houari
25	DF	MLI	Issouf Traoré
29	FW	MAR	Aziz Ennakhli
30	FW	MAR	Mehdi Dabdouby
31	DF	MAR	Mehdi El Haddouni
38	MF	MAR	El Mehdi El Ghaz
40	DF	MAR	Yasser Ezzine
77	FW	MAR	Youssef Dalouzi
90	GK	MAR	Oussama Errahmany
99	GK	MAR	Mourad Abdelwadie

== Honours ==
=== Domestic ===
- Botola
  - Winners: 1979–80
- Moroccan Throne Cup
  - Winners: 1972, 1975
  - Runners-up: 1987, 1999
- Moroccan Super Cup
  - Winners: 1975
- Maghreb Cup Winners Cup
  - Winners: 1972–73
  - Runners-up: 1974–75
