= Fath Union Sport =

Association football club in Morocco

FUS Rabat
- Full name: Fath Union Sport
- Founded: 10 April 1946; 80 years ago
- Ground: Moulay El Hassan Stadium
- Capacity: 22,000
- President: Mounir Majidi
- Manager: Ricardo Formosinho
- League: Botola Pro
- 2025–26: Botola Pro, 8th of 16
- Website: fus.ma
| Home colours | Away colours | Third colours |

Fath Union Sport (Arabic: إتحاد الفتح الرياضي), commonly known as FUS Rabat, is a Moroccan professional football club based in Rabat and currently playing in the Botola Pro. The club was founded on 10 April 1946. 'Fath Union Sport' is the name of the sports club which encompasses everything from Basketball to the game of Chess.

== History ==
=== Foundation ===
Founded on April 10, 1946 by the Marocain Nationalists, the Fath Union Sports is an omnisports club, located in a football section, based on the name of the most ancient clubs in the country. It was the héritier of the Union Musulmane de Rabat-Salé (USMRS), created in 1932, and was officially announced on 7 October 1932. The USM Rabat-Salé introduced the first Muslim clubs in the country, if this was not the first, and it was a veritable lance of a movement associated with the Marocaine Jeunesse.

The club competes in the Champions League of the 1st Division Amateurs, qualified in the 3rd division of the Maroc Football Association League, which is imported and placed in the Premier Division, and is the elite of the Marocain Football League Division D. 'Honour, and also participate in the North African Cup, on the local local tour.

=== Relationship with Prince Moulay Abdallah ===
Prince Moulay Abdallah was a fan of FUS de Rabat and the honorary president of the club, he supported the club financially and led the club to many achievements that are still etched in the memories of Moroccan football fans.

The late prince used to come to the stadium to see the training session without being recognized and to organize friendly games to harden the club's players and make them more efficient.

=== Titles ===
Although Fath de Rabat is one of the historical clubs in Morocco, it has only 6 titles won in the Moroccan Throne Cup respectively in 1967, 1973, 1976, 1995, 2010 and 2014. The club won the first cup after defeating RS Settat by two goals scored by Fettah and Laroussi to one in Stade D'honneur. The second one was taken in the city of Agadir after the team beat Ittihad Khemisset (3–1).

In 1976, FUS de Rabat got the third cup by defeating KAC Kénitra in Stade de Marchan, the only goal of the final match was scored by Khalid Labied, who was later the shared top scorer of 1980 African Cup of Nations.

The fans of Rabat's team did not rejoice any title only after almost twenty years when they got another Throne Cup in 1995 at the expense of Olympique Khouribga. The final match was finished by the score of 2–0, the goals had been scored by Postnov and Hammou.

On 25 November 2010 FUS de Rabat won their last cup in Stade Moulay Abdellah after overthrowing the team of Maghreb Fez by the score of 2–1. Issoufou scored the first goal and the second was made by El Fatihi.

=== African competitions ===
Since 2010, FUS de Rabat became one of five Moroccan teams that succeeded to have African titles after winning the 2010 CAF Confederation Cup, the club had also participated more than one time in African competitions.

After winning Moroccan Throne Cup in 1995 FUS de Rabat had participated in the African Cup Winners' Cup and succeeded to the quarter-final before being eliminated by Arab Contractors SC (0–1 on Aggregate). In that time Philippe Troussier was the coach of the team.

In 2002, The team participated in the CAF Cup and was eliminated from the second round by Satellite FC of Côte d'Ivoire. after a draw without goals in Morocco, they lost outside their ground by the score of 1–0.

Although it lost the final match of Moroccan Throne Cup in 2009 against neighbours AS FAR, the club had the opportunity to participate in the 2010 CAF Confederation Cup. FUS de Rabat managed to be the competition's surprise by disqualifying several famous teams and among them the defending champion Stade Malien after beating them in Rabat by the score of 2–0 and going to Bamako to have a draw (0–0). Rabat team would after that come in the top of Group B after having several good results against Zanaco, Haras El-Hodood and CS Sfaxien.

On 12 November 2010, FUS de Rabat was qualified for the first time to the final match of the competition although the team was defeated against Al-Ittihad of Libya by 1–0, because they did well outside in Tripoli by beating the home side by the score of 2–1 in June 11 Stadium.

The African title came on November 4, after making a draw 0–0 with CS Sfaxien one week before in Rabat, the team succeed to create the surprise in Sfax by beating the host team by the score of 3–2. Defender Boukhriss opened the score for FUS de Rabat but the hosts succeed to overturn the game in their favor after scoring two goals. In the 75th minute Mohamed Zouidi equalized the score and added the third goal in 89th minute while CS Sfaxien players were trying to score to take the title.

== Honours ==
List of trophies won by the club.

=== Domestic ===
- Botola
  - Winners (1): 2015–16
  - Runners-up (5) : 1972–73, 1973–74, 1980–81, 2000–01, 2011–12
- Coupe du Trône
  - Winners (6): 1966–67, 1972–73, 1975–76, 1994–95, 2010, 2014
  - Runners-up (3): 1959–60, 2008–09, 2014–15
- Moroccan Elite Cup
  - Winners (1): 1956
  - Runners-up (1): 1955
- Botola 2
  - Winners (4): 1961–62, 1997–98, 2006–07, 2008–09
  - Runners-up (1): 1950–51

=== Continental ===
- CAF Confederation Cup
  - Winners (1): 2010
- CAF Super Cup
  - Runners-up (1): 2011

== Performance in CAF competitions ==
- CAF Champions League: 2 appearance

2013 – Second round
2017 – Second round

- CAF Confederation Cup: 2 appearances

2010 – Champion
2011 – First Round of 16
2013 – Group stage (Top 8)
2015 – Second round
2016 – Semi-final
2017 – Semi-final

- CAF Cup: 1 appearance

2002 – Second Round

- CAF Cup Winners' Cup: 1 appearance

1996 – Quarter-Final

- CAF Super Cup: 1 appearance

2011 – Runner up

== Current squad ==
As of 2 October, 2026

Note: Flags indicate national team as defined under FIFA eligibility rules; some limited exceptions apply. Players may hold more than one non-FIFA nationality.

| No. | Pos. | Nation | Player |
|---|---|---|---|
| 1 | GK | MAR | Hamza Lizoul |
| 2 | DF | MAR | Faraji Karmoune |
| 3 | MF | MAR | Amine El Msane |
| 4 | DF | MAR | Yassine Amhih |
| 5 | MF | MAR | Anas Serrhat |
| 6 | MF | MAR | Issam Naji |
| 7 | FW | MAR | Chouaib Faidi |
| 8 | MF | MAR | Abdessamad Mahir |
| 9 | FW | MAR | Montasser Lahtimi |
| 10 | MF | MAR | Hilal Ferdaoussi |
| 13 | GK | MAR | Mehdi Bellarabi |
| 14 | MF | MAR | Amine Souane |
| 15 | DF | MAR | Amine Farhane |
| 16 | DF | MAR | Anas El Makkaoui |
| 17 | FW | MAR | Mohamed Bakhkhach |
| 18 | MF | MAR | Ismail Moutaraji |
| 19 | DF | MAR | Abdeslam Achhab |

| No. | Pos. | Nation | Player |
|---|---|---|---|
| 21 | FW | ANG | Anderson Cruz |
| 22 | FW | MAR | Mohamed Farhane |
| 23 | DF | MAR | Hamza Challali |
| 24 | FW | MAR | Yassine Belghroudi |
| 25 | DF | MAR | Walid El Hani |
| 26 | DF | MAR | Oussama Raoui |
| 27 | MF | MAR | Hamza Moujahid |
| 28 | FW | CGO | Déo Bassinga |
| 29 | FW | SEN | Moctar Diallo |
| 31 | DF | MOZ | Chamboco |
| 32 | DF | MAR | Abderrahman Arkid |
| 34 | DF | MAR | Achraf Zine |
| 36 | DF | MAR | Mustapha El Meskini |
| 42 | DF | MAR | Hamza Bouhaddi |
| 47 | DF | MAR | Oussama Soukhane |
| 49 | MF | MAR | Soufiane Tazi |
| 97 | GK | MAR | Ayoub Lakred |

== Coaching staff ==
| Position | Name |
|---|---|
| Manager | (Morocco) Saïd Chiba |
| Assistant Manager | (Morocco) Noureddine Benomar |
| First-Team Coach | (Morocco) Hafid Abdessadek |
| Goalkeeper Coach | |
| Fitness Coach | |
| Performance Analyst | |
| Club Doctor | |
| Physiotherapist | |
| Match Delegate | |

== Managers ==
- (Belgium) Mohamed Jebrane (1973–78)
- (Morocco) Zaki Badou (1993–95)
- (France) Philippe Troussier (1995–97)
- (Morocco) Saïd El Khider (1997–98)
- (Serbia) Ivica Todorov (1998–00)
- (France) Lucien Herppy (2000–2002)
- (Algeria) Nejmeddine Belayachi (September 2002 -April 2003)
- (Morocco) Noureddine Ben Omar (April 2003 - 2004)
- (Morocco) Abdellatif Salki (September 2004 - 2005)
- (Morocco) Jawhar (2005–06)
- (Morocco) Abderrazak Khairi (September 2006 - June 2007)
- (Morocco) Abdallah Blinda (June 2007 - August 2007)
- (Morocco) Rachid Taoussi (August 2007 - November 2007)
- (Morocco) Hicham Jedrane (November 2007 - January 2008)
- (France) François Bracci (January 2008 - July 2008)
- (Morocco) Hussein Amotta (July 2008 – June 2011)
- (Morocco) Jamal Sellami (June 2011 – May 2014)
- (Morocco) Walid Regragui (May 2014 – January 2020)
- (Morocco) Mustapha El Khalfi (January 2020 – April 2021)
- (Morocco) Mohamed Amine Benhachem (August 2021 – November 2021)
- (Morocco) Jamal Sellami (November 2021 – present)
