= 1948–49 Wydad AC season =

Season of a football club in Morocco

Wydad AC
1948–49 season
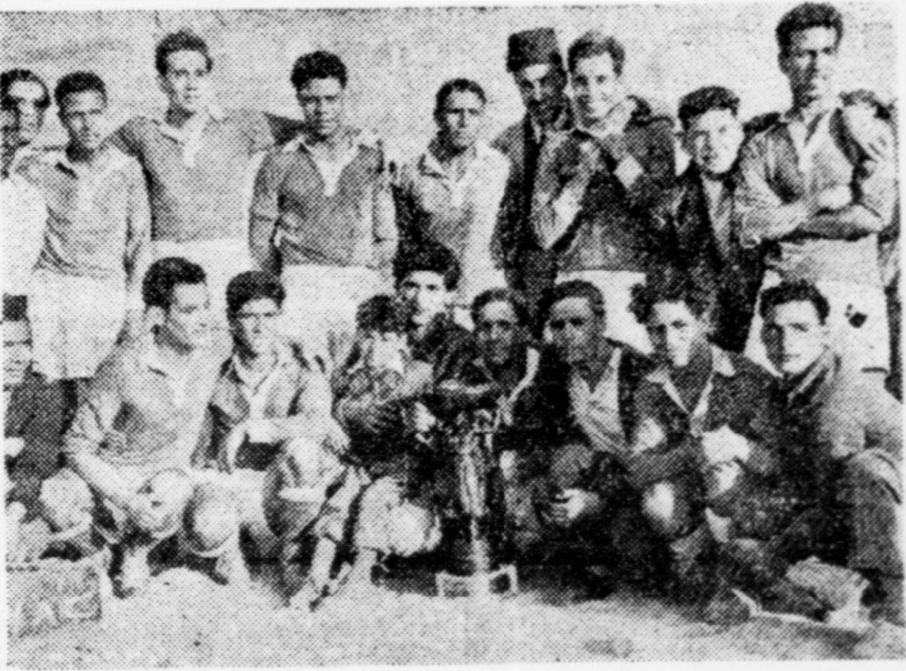
- Chairman: Abderrahman Slaoui
- Head coach: Père Jégo
- Stadium: Philip Stadium
- Division Honneur: 1st (in North African Championship)
- North African Cup: Winners
- North African Championship: Winners
- Top goalscorer: League: Abdesselem Ben Mohamed (21); All: Abdesselem (32)

In the 1948–49 season of Wydad AC, the team competed in the Division Honneur for the 3rd French protectorate era. They competed in Division Honneur, the North African Cup and also in the North African Championship.

== Competitions ==
=== Moroccan Championship ===
==== League table ====
Pos	Team	Pld	W	D	L	GF	GA	GD	Pts	Qualification or relegation
1	Wydad AC (C)	22	18	3	1	62	14	+48	61	Qualified for North African Championship
2	USD Meknès	22	13	5	4	53	21	+32	53	
3	US Athlétique	22	10	6	6	58	32	+26	48	
4	SA Marrakech	22	9	6	7	32	30	+2	46	
5	US Marocaine	22	7	8	7	47	42	+5	44	
6	Racing AC	22	6	9	7	32	30	+2	43	
7	ASPTT	22	9	3	10	32	37	−5	43	
8	Idéal CM	22	6	8	8	27	40	−13	42	
9	Stade Marocain	22	6	5	11	30	44	−14	39	
10	SC Mazagan	22	7	2	13	24	37	−13	38	
11	AS Tanger-Fès	22	4	6	12	23	48	−25	36	Qualification for the relegation play-offs
12	AS Marrakech	22	6	1	15	22	29	−7	35	Relegated to Division Pré-Honneur

(C) Champions

==== Matches ====
12 September 1948 1	US Marocaine	1–4	Wydad AC	Casablanca
	Laffaye 41'	Report	Chtouki 7'; Abdesselem 17'; Chtouki 66'; Driss 72'	Referee: Prieur

19 September 1948 2	Wydad AC	3–0	ASPTT	Casablanca
	Driss 30'; Driss 38'; Chtouki 89'	Report		Referee: Martinez

26 September 1948 3	Wydad AC	6–1	Stade Marocain	Casablanca
	Abdesselem 19'; Abdesselem; Driss; Chtouki; Chtouki 60'; Abdesselem	Report	Pasquier 12'	Referee: Cano

3 October 1948 4	Wydad AC	2–1	Racing AC	Casablanca
	Driss; Médiouni	Report	Corrazin

10 October 1948 5	SC Mazagan	1–3	Wydad AC	Mazagan
	Hector Rizzo	Report	Abdesselem; Hajjami; Own goal	Referee: Claverie

17 October 1948 6	Wydad AC	1–0	USD Meknès	Casablanca
	Abdesselem	Report		Referee: Prieur

24 October 1948 7	SA Marrakech	0–3	Wydad AC	Marrakesh
		Report	? Kabbour; Abdesselem	Referee: Franco

7 November 1948 8	AS Tanger-Fès	1–3	Wydad AC	Meknes
	Stephanato	Report	Chtouki; Abdesselem; Driss	Referee: Cano

21 November 1948 9	Wydad AC	7–2	Idéal CM	Casablanca
	Abdesselem; Abdesselem; Abdesselem; Abdesselem; Haffari; Abdesselem; Abdesselem	Report	Callejon; Cano	Referee: Gimenez

28 November 1948 10	US Athlétique	1–1	Wydad AC	Casablanca
	Mahjoub 25'	Report	Kabbour	Referee: Attuel

12 December 1948 12	Wydad AC	3–1	US Marocaine	Casablanca
	Chtouki; Moulay Driss; Chtouki	Report	Laffaye	Referee: Cano

19 December 1948 11	Wydad AC	3–0	AS Marrakech	Casablanca
	Abdesselem; Abdesselem; Abdesselem	Report		Referee: Da Silva

13 February 1949 13	ASPTT	0–5	Wydad AC	Casablanca
		Report	Driss; Zaar; Farrouj; Hajjami; Driss	Stadium: Terrain de l'ASPTT; Referee: Attuel

20 February 1949 15	Racing AC	0–2	Wydad AC	Casablanca
		Report	Chtouki; Zaar	Referee: Franco

27 February 1949 16	Wydad AC	3–1	SC Mazagan	Casablanca
	Abdesselem; Abdesselem; Mustapha	Report		Referee: Gimenez

6 March 1949 14	Stade Marocain	0–2	Wydad AC	Rabat
		Report	Abdesselem; Abdesselem

20 March 1949 18	Wydad AC	0–0	SA Marrakech	Casablanca
		Report		Referee: Franco

27 March 1949 19	Wydad AC	5–1	AS Tanger-Fès	Casablanca
	Abdenbi; Abdenbi; Achoud; Driss; Own goal	Report		Referee: Zorilla

17 April 1949 22	AS Marrakech	0–2	Wydad AC	Marrakesh
		Report	? ?	Referee: Claverie

24 April 1949 20	Idéal CM	1–1	Wydad AC	Casablanca
	Callejon	Report	Abdenbi	Referee: Mahé

8 May 1949 17	USD Meknès	2–1	Wydad AC	Meknes
	Marin; Delorraine	Report	Zaar	Referee: Attuel

22 May 1949 21	Wydad AC	2–0	US Athlétique	Casablanca
	Harraoui; Harraoui	Report		Referee: Santi

=== North African Cup ===
14 November 1948 2nd Round	US Khénifra	1–4	Wydad AC	Khénifra
	Abdenbi	Report	Kabbour; Moulay Driss; Driss; Driss

5 December 1948 3rd Round	Wydad AC	4–1	AS Rabat	Casablanca
	Chtouki; Moulay Driss; Moulay Driss; Chtouki	Report	Damié

9 January 1949 4th Round	Wydad AC	1–1	Olympique Marocain	Casablanca
	Chtouki	Report		Referee: Claverie

23 January 1949 4th Round Reply	Olympique Marocain	(w/o) (Note: Olympique Marocain forfeited the match.)	Wydad AC

30 January 1949 5th Round	Wydad AC	3–1	US Marocaine	Casablanca
	Abdesselem 21'; Driss; Abdesselem	Report	Martinez	Stadium: Stade Philip

6 February 1949 Round of 16	Red Star Algérois	1–3	Wydad AC	Algiers
	Ghanem	Report	Chtouki; Abdesselem; Abdesselem

13 March 1949 Quarterfinals	Wydad AC	2–1	USM Bône	Casablanca
	Driss; Zaar	Report	Saad	Stadium: Stade Philip

10 April 1949 Semifinals	Wydad AC	3–0	Olympique Hussein Dey	Casablanca
	Driss; Chtouki; Hajjami	Report		Stadium: Stade Philip; Referee: Barone

15 May 1949 Final	Wydad AC	2–1	US Athlétique	Casablanca
	Abdesselem 44'; Chtouki 75'	Report	Recio II 61'	Stadium: Stade Philip; Attendance: 9,000; Referee: Boes

=== North African Championship ===
==== Tournament table ====
Pos	Team	Pld	W	D	L	GF	GA	GD	Pts
1	Wydad AC (C)	4	3	0	1	14	4	+10	10
2	USM Oran	4	3	0	1	7	7	0	10
3	MO Constantine	4	2	0	2	12	9	+3	8
4	Olympique Hussein Dey	4	1	1	2	6	7	−1	7
5	CA Bizertin	4	0	1	3	4	16	−12	5

(C) Champions

==== Matches ====
29 May 1949 Matchday 1	Wydad AC	5–0	USM Oran	Casablanca
	Abdesselem; Driss; Mustapha; Zaar; Abdesselem	Report		Stadium: Stade Philip; Referee: Riveccio

5 June 1949 Matchday 2	Wydad AC	6–2	CA Bizertin	Casablanca
	Abdesselem; Driss; Chtouki; Driss; Abdesselem; Abdesselem	Report		Stadium: Stade Philip; Referee: Atanacio

12 June 1949 Matchday 3	Olympique Hussein Dey	2–0	Wydad AC	Hussein Dey
	Belamine; Molina	Report		Attendance: 10,000; Referee: Bédène

19 June 1949 Matchday 4	Wydad AC	3–0	MO Constantine	Casablanca
	Driss; Abdesselem; Chtouki	Report		Referee: Carattino

== Statistics ==
=== Squad statistics ===
Competition	Record								Started round	Final position / round	First match	Last match
Competition	G	W	D	L	GF	GA	GD	Win %	Started round	Final position / round	First match	Last match
Division Honneur	22	18	3	1	62	14	+48	81.82	Matchday 1	Winners	12 September 1948	22 May 1949
North African Cup	9	8	1	0	22	7	+15	88.89	Second round	Winners	14 November 1948	15 May 1949
North African Championship	4	3	0	1	14	4	+10	75.00	Matchday 1	Winners	29 May 1949	19 June 1949
Total	34	28	4	2	98	25	+73	82.35				
