= 1949–50 Wydad AC season =

Season of a football club in Morocco

Wydad AC
1949–50 season
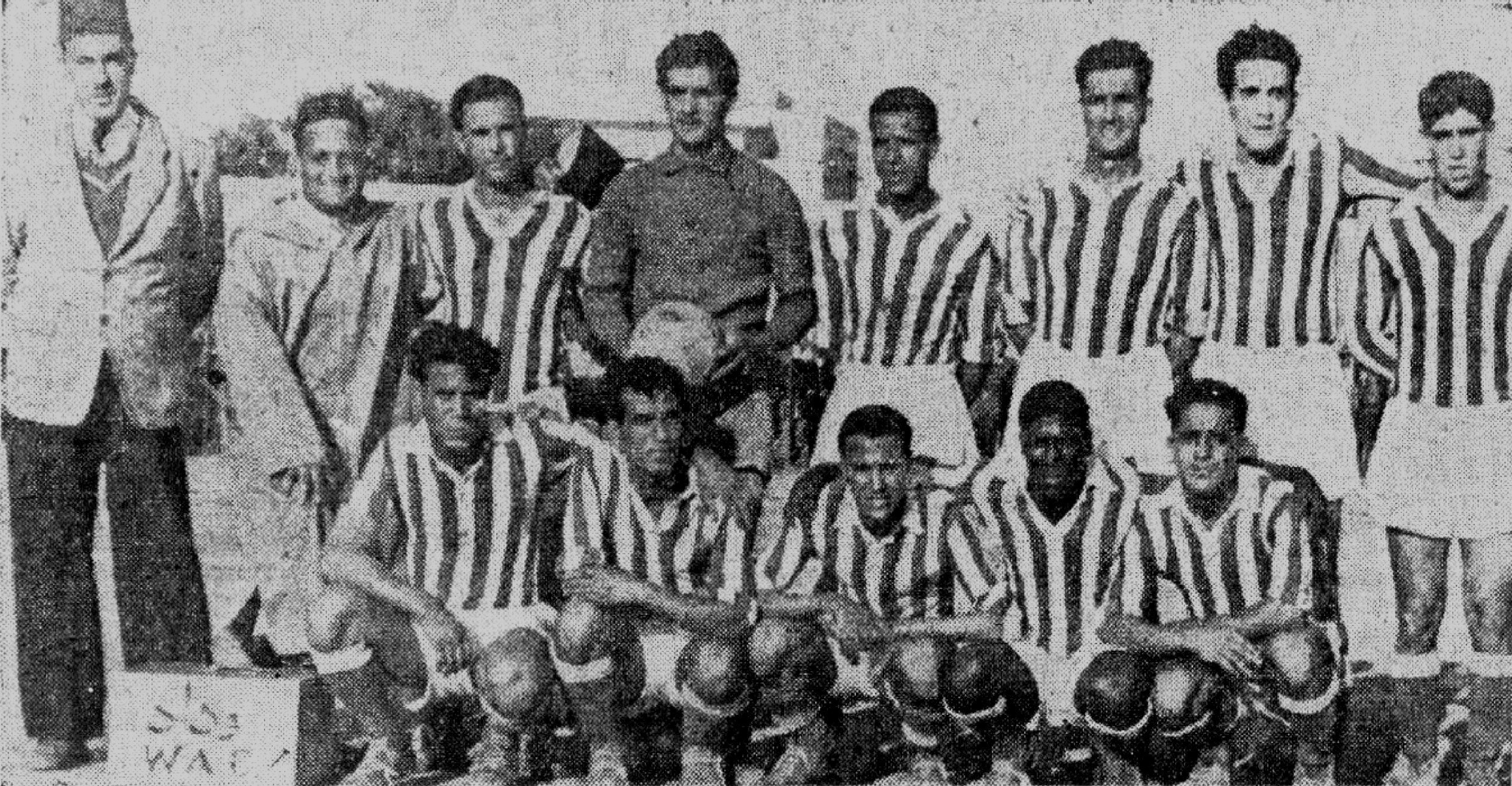
- Chairman: Abderrahman Slaoui
- Head coach: Père Jégo
- Stadium: Philip Stadium
- Division Honneur: 1st (in North African Championship)
- North African Cup: Round of 16
- North African Championship: Winners
- Top goalscorer: League: (Morocco) Driss Joumad (20); All: (Morocco) Driss (24)

In the 1949–50 season of Wydad AC, the team competed in the Division Honneur for the 4rd French protectorate era. They competed in Division Honneur, the North African Cup and also in the North African Championship.

== Competitions ==
=== Moroccan Championship ===
==== League table ====
Pos	Team	Pld	W	D	L	GF	GA	GD	Pts	Qualification or relegation
1	Wydad AC (C)	22	17	4	1	62	16	+46	60	Qualified for North African Championship
2	USD Meknès	22	18	1	3	61	21	+40	59	
3	US Safi	22	14	2	6	54	29	+25	52	
4	Racing AC	22	10	6	6	35	27	+8	48	
5	US Marocaine	22	10	5	7	40	21	+19	47	
6	Stade Marocain	22	7	5	10	39	26	+13	41	
7	SC Mazagan	22	8	5	9	37	27	+10	43	
8	SA Marrakech	22	6	6	10	35	42	−7	40	
9	US Athlétique	22	6	5	11	23	43	−20	39	
10	ASPTT	22	6	5	11	31	51	−20	39	
11	Idéal CM	22	3	4	15	21	58	−37	32	Qualification for the relegation play-offs
12	Olympique Marocain	22	2	1	19	16	67	−51	27	Relegated to Division Pré-Honneur

(C) Champions

==== Matches ====
4 September 1949 1	Wydad AC	4–0	Idéal CM	Casablanca
	Driss; Bouchaib; Driss; Bouchaib	Report

11 September 1949 2	Wydad AC	1–0	US Marocaine	Casablanca
	Abdesselem	Report

18 September 1949 3	Olympique Marocain	2–6	Wydad AC	Rabat
	Di Manzo 22'; Madani 50'	Report	Kadmiri 6'; Harraoui 20'; Abdesselem 34'; Kadmiri 65'; Driss 70'; Abdesselem 75'

25 September 1949 4	Wydad AC	4–0	US Safi	Casablanca
	Abdesselem; Driss; Abdesselem; Abdesselem	Report

2 October 1949 5	Racing AC	2–3	Wydad AC	Casablanca
		Report	Abdesselem; Abdesselem; Djilali

9 October 1949 6	Wydad AC	1–3	USD Meknès	Casablanca
	Driss	Report	Driss; Ortéga; Driss

16 October 1949 7	Wydad AC	4–0	US Athlétique	Casablanca
	Driss; Driss; Driss; Driss	Report

23 October 1949 8	ASPTT	1–1	Wydad AC	Casablanca
		Report	Chtouki

13 November 1949 9	Wydad AC	4–1	SA Marrakech	Casablanca
	Bouchaib; Own goal Abdesselem; Driss	Report

20 November 1949 10	SC Mazagan	0–1	Wydad AC	Mazagan
		Report	Abdesselem

27 November 1949 11	Stade Marocain	1–1	Wydad AC	Rabat
		Report	Abdesselem

18 December 1949 12	Idéal CM	1–2	Wydad AC	Casablanca
		Report	Driss; Bouchaib

22 January 1950 13	US Marocaine	2–2	Wydad AC	Casablanca
		Report	Driss; Abdesselem

29 January 1950 14	Wydad AC	3–1	Olympique Marocain	Casablanca
	Harraoui; Harraoui; Abdesselem	Report

19 February 1950 15	US Safi	0–2	Wydad AC	Safi
		Report	Harraoui; Hajjami

26 February 1950 16	Wydad AC	0–0	Racing AC	Casablanca
		Report

19 March 1950 17	USD Meknès	0–4	Wydad AC	Meknes
		Report	Own goal Mustapha; Driss; Mustapha

26 March 1950 18	US Athlétique	0–5	Wydad AC	Casablanca
		Report

16 April 1950 19	Wydad AC	2–1	ASPTT	Casablanca
	Chtouki; Driss	Report

23 April 1950 20	SA Marrakech	0–5	Wydad AC	Marrakesh
		Report	Haffari; Chtouki; Driss; Own goal Hajjami

30 April 1950 21	Wydad AC	5–1	SC Mazagan	Casablanca
	Driss; Zaar; Driss; Chtouki; Zaar	Report

14 May 1950 22	Wydad AC	2–0	Stade Marocain	Casablanca
	Chtouki; Hajjami	Report

=== North African Cup ===
14 January 1950 Round of 32	Wydad AC	4–0	CAL Oran	Casablanca
	Abdesselem; Driss; Chtouki; Chtouki	Report		Stadium: Stade Philip

12 February 1950 Round of 16	JBAC Bône	2–1	Wydad AC	Bône
		Report	Chtouki

=== North African Championship ===
21 May 1950 Preliminary Round	ES Sahel	1–3	Wydad AC	Tunis
		Report	Driss; Abdesselem; Chtouki

27 May 1950 Semi-finals	AS Bône	1–3	Wydad AC	Algiers
		Report	Chtouki; Driss; Driss

28 May 1950 Final	USM Oran	0–4	Wydad AC	Algiers
		Report	Hajjami; Abdesselem; Abdesselem; Haffari	Stadium: Stade Municipal

== Statistics ==
=== Squad statistics ===
Competition	Record								Started round	Final position / round	First match	Last match
Competition	G	W	D	L	GF	GA	GD	Win %	Started round	Final position / round	First match	Last match
Division Honneur	22	17	4	1	62	16	+46	77.27	Matchday 1	Winners	4 September 1949	14 May 1950
North African Cup	2	1	0	1	5	2	+3	50.00	Round of 32	Round of 16	14 January 1950	12 February 1950
North African Championship	3	3	0	0	13	2	+11	100.00	Preliminary Round	Winners	21 May 1950	29 May 1950
Total	27	21	4	2	80	20	+60	77.78				
