= 1953–54 Wydad AC season =

Season of a football club in Morocco

Wydad AC
1953–54 season
- Head coach: Père Jégo
- Stadium: Philip Stadium
- Division Honneur: 5th
- North African Cup: Round of 32
- Top goalscorer: League: Pierre Gomez (10); All: Gomez (10)

In the 1953–54 season of Moroccan football club Wydad AC, the team competed in the Division Honneur for the 8rd French protectorate era. They competed in Division Honneur and the North African Cup.

== Competitions ==
=== Moroccan Championship ===
==== League table ====
Pos	Team	Pld	W	D	L	GF	GA	GD	Pts	Qualification or relegation
1	Racing AC (C)	22	12	6	4	41	23	+18	52	Qualified for North African Championship
2	US Marocaine	22	10	7	5	30	16	+14	49	
3	SCC Roches Noires	22	9	7	6	27	27	0	47	
4	Stade Marocain	22	9	7	6	26	24	+2	47	
5	Wydad AC	22	7	10	5	30	26	+4	46	
6	USD Meknès	22	9	6	7	42	32	+10	46	
7	FUS Rabat	22	5	12	5	32	32	0	44	
8	SA Marrakech	22	7	6	9	32	35	−3	42	
9	AS Tanger-Fès	22	6	6	10	29	36	−7	40	
10	MC Oujda	22	5	8	9	25	35	−10	40	
11	Olympique Marocain	22	5	6	11	25	35	−10	38	Relegated to Division Pré-Honneur
12	MAS Fez	22	6	3	13	25	44	−19	37	Relegated to Division Pré-Honneur

(C) Champions

==== Matches ====
6 September 1953 1	Stade Marocain	3–0	Wydad AC	Rabat
	Mekki 4'; Ben Aïssa 28'; Ben Aïssa 37'	Report		Attendance: 1,720; Referee: Boubeker

13 September 1953 2	Wydad AC	4–2	FUS Rabat	Casablanca
	Bouarif 5'; Assila 15'; Gomez 25'; Kabbour 40'	Report	Own goal 18'; Jelloul 70'	Referee: Boukili

20 September 1953 3	USD Meknès	2–3	Wydad AC	Meknes
	Milazzo 15'; Milazzo 99'	Report	Gomez 5'; Assila 57'; Driss 59'	Attendance: 2,257; Referee: Zorilla

27 September 1953 4	Wydad AC	3–0	SCC Roches Noires	Casablanca
	Bouarif 32'; Kabbour 49'; Assila 52'	Report		Stadium: Stade Philip; Referee: Mascaro

4 October 1953 5	Wydad AC	1–1	MC Oujda	Casablanca
	Gomez 58'	Report	Ben Salem 12'	Stadium: Stade Philip; Referee: Boubeker

11 October 1953 6	Wydad AC	3–2	MAS Fez	Casablanca
	Assila 20'; Gomez 58'; Gomez 73'	Report	Debbag 10'; Debbag 38'	Stadium: Stade Philip; Referee: Seux

18 October 1953 7	Racing AC	0–0	Wydad AC	Casablanca
		Report		Stadium: Stade Philip; Attendance: 2,983

25 October 1953 8	Olympique Marocain	1–0	Wydad AC	Rabat
	Sanchis 69'	Report		Stadium: Stade Joseph Moynat; Attendance: 2,203; Referee: Boussard

8 November 1953 9	SA Marrakech	2–2	Wydad AC	Marrakesh
	Dussoni 66'; Dussoni 80'	Report	Driss 53'; Driss 65'	Attendance: 1,850; Referee: Mazzasalma

11 November 1953 10	Wydad AC	0–1	US Marocaine	Casablanca
		Report	Berto 77'	Stadium: Stade Philip; Referee: Franco

15 November 1953 11	Wydad AC	2–3	AS Tanger-Fès	Casablanca
	Kabbour 40'; Kabbour 55'	Report	Driss 20'; Scanella 27'; Marion 90'	Stadium: Stade Philip; Attendance: 2,493; Referee: Cano

6 December 1953 12	Wydad AC	0–0	Stade Marocain	Casablanca
		Report		Stadium: Stade Philip; Referee: Moussard

17 January 1954 13	FUS Rabat	1–1	Wydad AC	Rabat
	Dogmy 23'	Report	Gomez 47'	Stadium: Stade Joseph Moynat; Referee: Bocato

24 January 1954 14	Wydad AC	3–2	USD Meknès	Casablanca
	Gomez 3'; Gomez 6'; Scali 60'	Report	Milazzo 28'; Milazzo 79'	Stadium: Stade Philip; Referee: Franco

31 January 1954 15	SCC Roches Noires	1–1	Wydad AC	Casablanca
	Sévilla 54'	Report	Battache 62'	Referee: Marronne

14 February 1954 16	MC Oujda	1–2	Wydad AC	Oujda
	Koulouch 53'	Report	Gomez 71'; Kabbour 84'	Attendance: 970

21 February 1954 17	MAS Fez	0–0	Wydad AC	Fez
		Report		Attendance: 2,500; Referee: Navarro

7 March 1954 18	Wydad AC	0–1	Racing AC	Casablanca
		Report	Abad 9'	Stadium: Stade Philip; Referee: Mezzasalma

14 March 1954 19	Wydad AC	1–1	Olympique Marocain	Casablanca
	Driss 15'	Report	Gonzalès 82'	Stadium: Stade Philip; Referee: Franco

21 March 1954 20	Wydad AC	3–1	SA Marrakech	Casablanca
	Belhassan 23'; Belhassan 38'; Gomez 75'	Report	Martinez 16'	Stadium: Stade Philip; Referee: Doukkali

28 March 1954 21	US Marocaine	0–0	Wydad AC	Casablanca
		Report		Stadium: Stade Philip; Referee: Boukili

25 April 1954 22	AS Tanger-Fès	1–1	Wydad AC	Meknes
	Doriot 84'	Report	Driss 50'	Attendance: 1,200

=== North African Cup ===
9 January 1954 Round of 32	Wydad AC	1–3	GS Orléanville	Casablanca
	Mustapha 83'	Report	Ferdji 23'; Bertoli 58'; Daoud 64'	Stadium: Stade Philip; Referee: Benjahi

== Statistics ==
=== Squad statistics ===
Competition	Record								Started round	Final position / round	First match	Last match
Competition	G	W	D	L	GF	GA	GD	Win %	Started round	Final position / round	First match	Last match
Division Honneur	22	7	10	5	30	26	+4	31.82	Matchday 1	5th	6 September 1953	25 April 1954
North African Cup	1	0	0	1	1	3	−2	0.00	Round of 32		14 January 1954	
Total	23	7	10	6	31	29	+2	30.43				
