= Habib Bouakeul Stadium =

Multi-use stadium in Oran, Algeria

Coordinates: 35°40′45″N 0°40′31″W

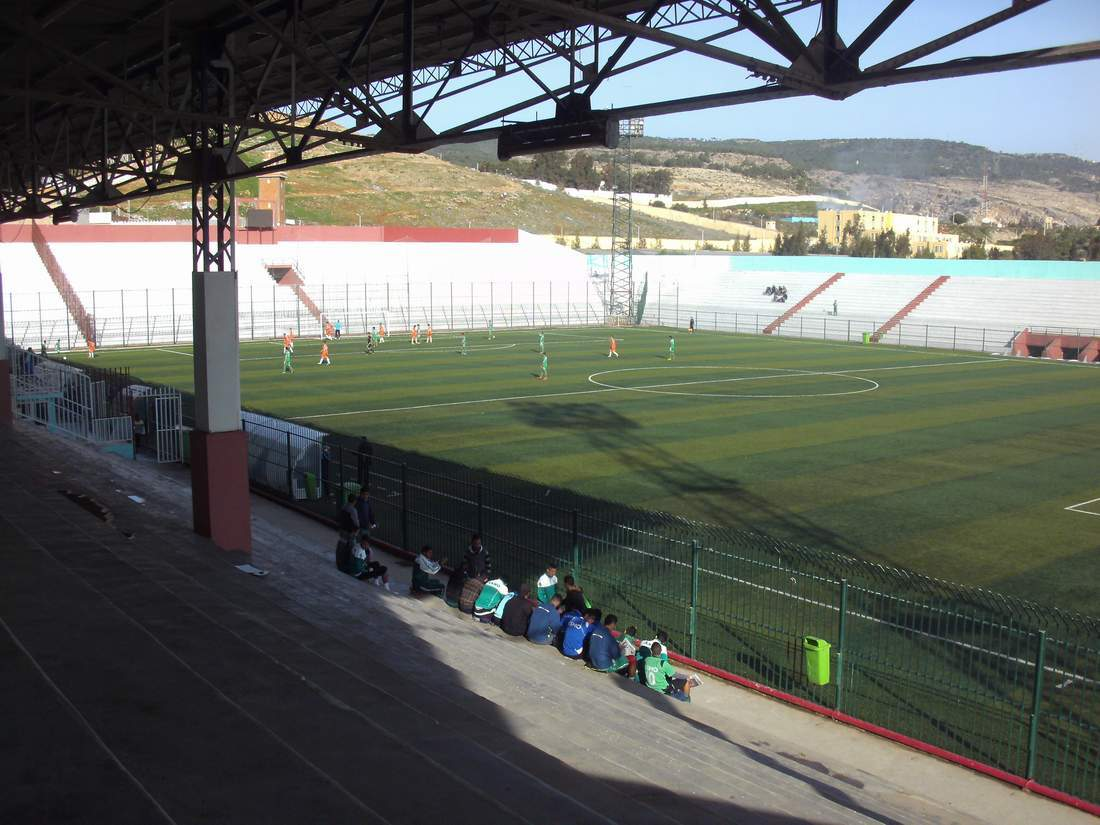
- Interactive map of Habib Bouakeul Stadium
- Full name: Habib Bouakeul Stadium
- Former names: Alenda; Vincent Monréal
- Location: Route de Misserghin, Haï El-Louz; Oran, Algeria
- Owner: APC of Oran
- Capacity: 20,000
- Surface: Grass

Construction
- Opened: 1927; 99 years ago
- Renovated: 19 December 1948; 1988; October, 2009; February 2013

Tenants
- ASM Oran; SCM Oran

The Habib Bouakeul Stadium (Arabic: ملعب الحبيب بوعقل) is a multi-use stadium in Oran, Algeria. It is currently used mostly for football matches and is the home ground of ASM Oran. Another club, SCM Oran also play there. The stadium holds 20,000 people.

== History ==
The stadium was built in 1927 in the Les Amandiers district (now Haï El-Louz) of Oran under the name of the Stade Alenda. It was renovated on 19 December 1948, when its name was changed to Stade Vincent Monréal; it was the biggest stadium in Oran at the time. After the independence of Algeria, it was renamed Stade Habib Bouakeul in commemoration of Habib Bouakeul, a martyr of the Algeria War.

The stadium was equipped with artificial turf to replace natural grass; a newer turf was installed in 2013.

== Matches ==
Below is a list of some important matches played at the stadium:

Club matches

Event	Date	Time (CET)	Team #1	Result	Team #2	Round	Spectators
1930–31 North African Championship	14 June 1931	-:-	CDJ Oran	3–2 (a.e.t.)	Stade Marocain	Final	
1932–33 North African Championship	28 May 1933	-:-	USM Oran	0–3	US Marocaine	Final	
1932–33 North African Cup	March 1933	-:-	CDJ Oran	2–1	US Marocaine	Final	
1935–36 North African Championship	7 June 1936	-:-	GC Oran	5–0	AS Saint Eugène	Final	
1948–49 North African Championship	28 June 1949	-:-	Wydad Casablanca	6–2	CA Bizertin	Final	
1949–50 North African Cup	1950	-:-	SC Bel Abbès	3–4	AS Saint Eugène	Final	
1952–53 North African Championship	7 June 1953	-:-	SC Bel Abbès	4–0	FC Blidéen	Final	
1953–54 North African Cup	1954	-:-	USM Oran	0–1	USSC Témouchent	Final	
1953–54 North African Championship	30 May 1954	-:-	SC Bel Abbès	6–1	CS Hammam-Lif	Final	
1954–55 North African Cup	1955	-:-	SC Bel Abbès	5–2 (a.e.t.)	GS Alger	Final	
1956–57 Algerian Cup (FFF)	1957	-:-	AS Marine d'Oran	2–2	AGS Mascara	Final - 1st game	
1956–57 Algerian Cup (FFF)	1957	-:-	AS Marine d'Oran	2–2	AGS Mascara	Final - replayed	
1956–57 Algerian Cup (FFF)	28 April 1957	-:-	AS Marine d'Oran	3–1 (a.e.t.)	AGS Mascara	Final - replayed 2	
1989 African Cup of Champions Clubs	26 May 1989	-:-	Mouloudia d'Oran	3–1	ES Tunis	Second round - 2nd leg	
1989 African Cup of Champions Clubs	22 September 1989	-:-	MC Oran	4–0	Al-Mourada	Quarter final - 2nd leg	
1989 African Cup of Champions Clubs	5 November 1989	-:-	MC Oran	5–2	Nkana Red Devils	Semi final - 2nd leg	
1993 African Cup of Champions Clubs	17 September 1993	-:-	MC Oran	1–1	Zamalek	Quarter final - 2nd leg	

Algeria NT matches

3 May 1974 Friendly	Algeria	3–1	(England) Sheffield United	Oran, Algeria
--:-- UTC+1	Belkedrouci 15'; Lalmas 47'; Belbahri 85'		Nicols 46'	Stadium: Habib Bouakeul Stadium; Attendance: 15 000

== See also ==
- List of football stadiums in Algeria
- Ahmed Zabana Stadium
- Miloud Hadefi Stadium
