= List of Moroccan football champions =

Moroccan football league champions

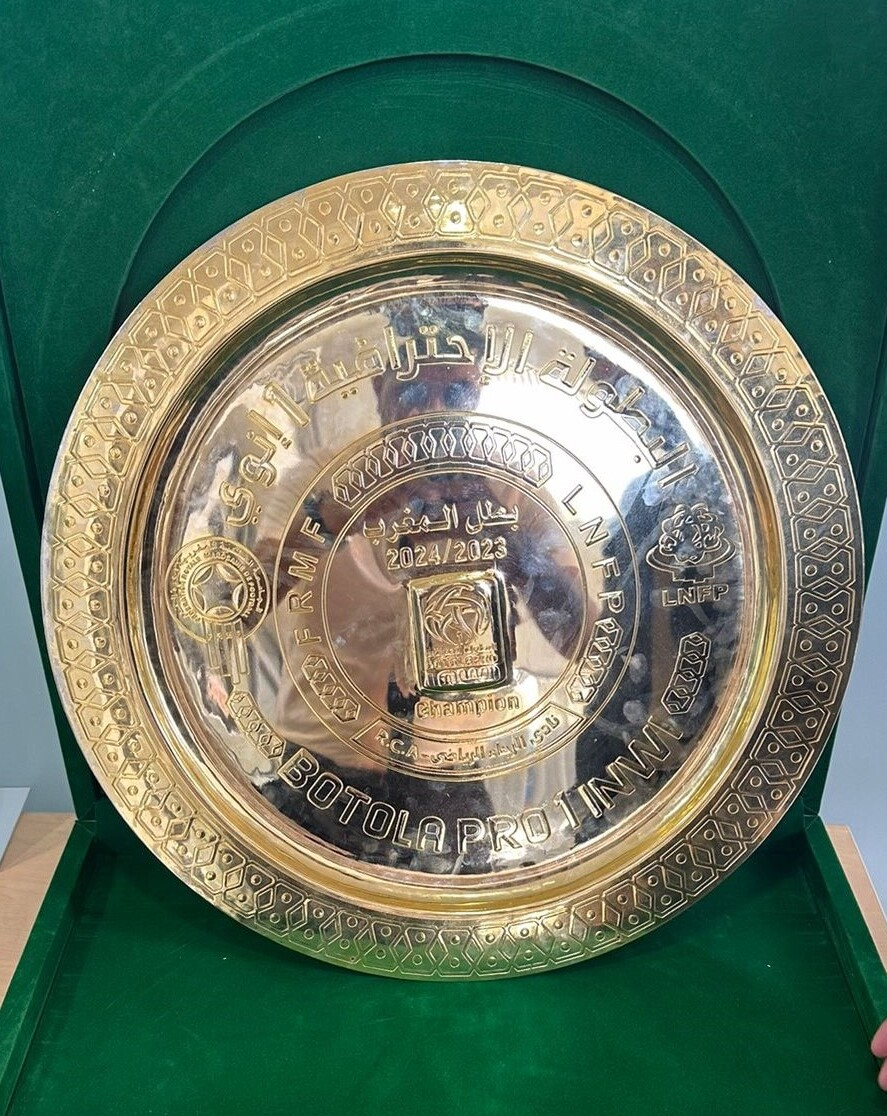
- Founded: 1915; 111 years ago
- Country: Morocco
- Confederation: CAF
- Current champions: MAS Fez (5th title) (2025–26)
- Most championships: Wydad AC (22 titles)
- Current: 2026–27 Botola Pro

The Moroccan football champions are the annual winners of the primary football competition in Morocco. The league is contested on a round-robin basis, with the title awarded to the team that finishes top at the end of the season.

Wydad AC are the most successful club, with 22 league titles, followed by Raja CA and AS FAR with 13 each. The current champions are MAS Fez, who claimed their fifth title in the 2025–26 season.

The two lowest-placed teams in Botola Pro are relegated to the Botola Pro 2 and replaced by the top two teams from that division. Only three clubs have never been relegated, Wydad AC, Raja CA and AS FAR.

== Champions ==
=== Under the Rule of the USFSA (1915–1922) - LMFA (1922–1955) ===
Season	Winners
1915–16	CA Casablanca (1)
1916–17	US Marocaine (1)
1917–18	US Marocaine (2)
1918–19	US Marocaine (3)
1919–20	USD Meknès (1)
1920–21	Olympique Marocain (1)
1921–22	US Meknès (2)
1922–23	Olympique Marocain (2)
1923–24	Olympique Marocain (3)
1924–25	US Fès (1)
1925–26	US Fès (2)
1926–27	US Athlétique (1)
1927–28	Stade Marocain (1)
1928–29	US Athlétique (2)
1929–30	Olympique Marocain (4)
1930–31	Stade Marocain (2)
1931–32	US Marocaine (4)
1932–33	US Marocaine (5)
1933–34	US Marocaine (6)
1934–35	US Marocaine (7)
1935–36	Olympique Marocain (5)
1936–37	Olympique Marocain (6)
1937–38	US Marocaine (8)
1938–39	US Marocaine (9)
1939–40	US Marocaine (10)
1940–41	US Marocaine (11)
1941–42	US Marocaine (12)
1942–43	US Marocaine (13)
1943–44	Stade Marocain (3)
1944–45	Racing Casablanca (1)
1945–46	US Marocaine (14)
1946–47	US Athlétique (3)
1947–48	Wydad AC (1)
1948–49	Wydad AC (2)
1949–50	Wydad AC (3)
1950–51	Wydad AC (4)
1951–52	US Marocaine (15)
1952–53	SA Marrakech (1)
1953–54	Racing Casablanca (2)
1954–55	Wydad AC (5)
1955–56	No completed

=== Under the Rule of the Ligue de la Libre (1945–1955) ===
Season	Winners
1945–46	
1946–47	
1947–48	Najah Marrakech
1948–49	Fath Casablanca
1949–50	
1950–51	
1951–52	
1952–53	
1953–54	
1954–55	

=== After Independence (1956–present) ===
Vous parlez d'une prétendue continuité des championnats coloniaux de 1915 de la LMFA, tout en ignorant totalement que la hiérarchie des clubs de 1956 a été établie grâce aux huitièmes de finale de la Coupe du Trône. Une question simple à laquelle vous ne pourrez jamais répondre : savez-vous réellement qui a créé et organisé la Coupe du Trône en 1946 ? C'est la Ligue de la Libre, sous l'impulsion du nationaliste Abdeslam Bennani, et dont le dernier président était Omar Boucetta, le véritable fondateur de la Fédération. Par conséquent, en vous basant sur une compétition enfantée par la Ligue de la Libre pour structurer le championnat de 1956, vous détruisez vous-mêmes le mythe de la continuité de la LMFA.

Key
Champions also won the Throne Cup that season
Champions also won the CAF Champions League that season
Champions also won the CAF Confederation Cup that season

- The "Top scorer(s)" column refers to the player who scored the most goals during that season
- The "Goals" column refers to the number of goals scored by the top scorer in the league in that season

Season	Winners	Runners-up	Top scorer(s)	Top scorer's club(s)	Goals
1956–57	Wydad AC (6)	KAC Marrakech	(Morocco) Abdelkarim Zidani	KAC Marrakech	21
1957–58	KAC Marrakech (1)	Wydad AC	(Morocco) Mohamed Chtaini Fejjar	Difaâ Hassani El Jadidi	22
1958–59	Étoile Casablanca (1)	Wydad AC	(Morocco) Mohamed Khalfi	Wydad AC	21
1959–60	Kénitra AC (1)	AS FAR	(Morocco) Moussa Hanoune	Raja CA	22
1960–61	AS FAR (1)	Maghreb Fez	(Morocco) Harchaoui	Étoile Casablanca	19
1961–62	AS FAR (2)	Racing Casablanca	(Morocco) Mjidou (Morocco) Abdelkarim Zidani (Morocco) Harchaoui	SCC Mohammédia KAC Marrakech Étoile Casablanca	13
1962–63	AS FAR (3)	KAC Marrakech	(Morocco) Kébir Mezzour	Fath Union Sport	17
1963–64	AS FAR (4)	Stade Marocain	(France) Robert Traba	SCC Mohammédia	23
1964–65	Maghreb Fez (1)	Racing Casablanca	(Morocco) Fettah Filali	Fath Union Sport	20
1965–66	Wydad AC (7)	Raja CA	(Morocco) Hmida Azzaoui	MC Oujda	14
1966–67	AS FAR (5)	RS Settat	(Morocco) Abdelatif Chiadmi (Morocco) Houmane Jarir	Difaâ Hassani El Jadidi Raja CA	18
1967–68	AS FAR (6)	RS Settat	(Morocco) Abderrahmane Chicha	Difaâ Hassani El Jadidi	19
1968–69	Wydad AC (8)	Maghreb Fez	(Morocco) Ahmed Faras	SCC Mohammédia	16
1969–70	AS FAR (7)	US Sidi Kacem	(Morocco) Abdallah Bendriss	US Sidi Kacem	17
1970–71	RS Settat (1)	AS FAR	(Morocco) Abdallah Bendriss	US Sidi Kacem	19
1971–72	Racing Casablanca (3)	Wydad AC	(Morocco) Miloud Ouazir	Difaâ Hassani El Jadidi	18
1972–73	Kénitra AC (2)	Fath Union Sport	(Morocco) Ahmed Faras	SCC Mohammédia	16
1973–74	Raja Beni Mellal (1)	Raja CA	(Morocco) Abdelhay Benjilali (Morocco) Â Ahmed	AS Salé Tihad AS	11
1974–75	MC Oujda (1)	Maghreb Fez	(Morocco) Abderrahmane Chicha	Difaâ Hassani El Jadidi	12
1975–76	Wydad AC (9)	Difaâ Hassani El Jadidi	(Morocco) Hassan Amcharrat	SCC Mohammédia	20
1976–77	Wydad AC (10)	MC Oujda	(Morocco) Mohamed Boussati	Kénitra AC	17
1977–78	Wydad AC (11)	Maghreb Fez	(Morocco) Mustapha Chahid	Wydad AC	16
1978–79	Maghreb Fez (2)	Kénitra AC	(Morocco) Achibat	RS Berkane	17
1979–80	SCC Mohammédia (1)	Wydad AC	(Morocco) Idrissi	MC Oujda	10
1980–81	Kénitra AC (3)	Fath Union Sport	(Morocco) Mohamed Boussati	Kénitra AC	25
1981–82	Kénitra AC (4)	Wydad AC	(Morocco) Mohamed Boussati	Kénitra AC	17
1982–83	Maghreb Fez (3)	RS Berkane	(Morocco) Abdelfettah Rhiati	Maghreb Fez	10
1983–84	AS FAR (8)	Olympique Khouribga	(Morocco) Abderrazak Khairi	AS FAR	12
1984–85	Maghreb Fez (4)	Kénitra AC	(Morocco) M'jidou (Morocco) Alaeddine Tmimi	Wydad AC MC Oujda	11
1985–86	Wydad AC (12)	Raja CA	(Morocco) Hmida Boushaba	RS Berkane	17
1986–87	AS FAR (9)	KAC Marrakech	(Morocco) Hassan Nader (Morocco) Mohammed Chaouch	Wydad AC KAC Marrakech	13
1987–88	Raja CA (1)	KAC Marrakech	(Morocco) Lahcen Anaflous	AS FAR	17
1988–89	AS FAR (10)	Maghreb Fez	(Morocco) Lahcen Anaflous	AS FAR	15
1989–90	Wydad AC (13)	IR Tangier	(Morocco) Hassan Nader	Wydad AC	18
1990–91	Wydad AC (14)	AS FAR	(Morocco) Abdeslam Laghrissi	AS FAR	22
1991–92	KAC Marrakech (2)	Raja CA	(Morocco) Lahcen Anaflous	AS FAR	11
1992–93	Wydad AC (Note: Also won the Afro-Asian Club Championship) (15)	Raja CA	(Morocco) Youssef Fertout	Wydad AC	18
1993–94	Olympique Casablanca (1)	Wydad AC	(Morocco) Ahmed Bahja	KAC Marrakech	14
1994–95	COD Meknès (1)	Olympique Casablanca	(Morocco) Abdeslam Laghrissi	AS FAR	15
1995–96 (Note: The first season with the current three points-for-a-win format.)	Raja CA (2)	Olympique Khouribga	(Morocco) Mustapha Soufir	JS Massira	15
1996–97	Raja CA (3)	Wydad AC	(Morocco) Saïd Anane	AS Salé	16
1997–98	Raja CA (4)	KAC Marrakech	(Morocco) Rachid Rokki	SCC Mohammédia	16
1998–99	Raja CA (5)	KAC Marrakech	(Morocco) Abdelaziz Zouine	Olympique Khouribga	15
1999–2000	Raja CA (6)	Wydad AC	(Morocco) Mustapha Bidoudane	Fath Union Sport	17
2000–01	Raja CA (7)	Fath Union Sport	(Morocco) Samir Sarsar	KAC Marrakech	12
2001–02	Hassania Agadir (1)	Wydad AC	(Morocco) Omar Zaouit	Tihad Sportif Casablanca	14
2002–03	Hassania Agadir (2)	Raja CA	(Morocco) Mustapha Bidoudane	Fath Union Sport	14
2003–04	Raja CA (8)	AS FAR	(Morocco) Mustapha Bidoudane	Raja CA	13
2004–05	AS FAR (11)	Raja CA	(Morocco) Mohamed Armoumen	AS FAR	12
2005–06	Wydad AC (16)	AS FAR	(Guinea) Mamadou Ba Camara	Olympique Khouribga	9
2006–07	Olympique Khouribga (1)	AS FAR	(Morocco) Jawad Ouaddouch	AS FAR	12
2007–08	AS FAR (12)	IZ Khemisset	(Morocco) Abderrazak El Mnasfi	AS FAR	13
2008–09	Raja CA (9)	Difaâ Hassani El Jadidi	(Morocco) Mustapha Allaoui	AS FAR	14
2009–10	Wydad AC (17)	Raja CA	(Morocco) Omar Hassi	Wydad Fès	12
2010–11	Raja CA (10)	Maghreb Fez	(Morocco) Jawad Ouaddouch	AS FAR	11
Botola Pro (2011–present)
2011–12	MA Tétouan (1)	Fath Union Sport	(Chad) Karl Max Barthélémy	Difaâ Hassani El Jadidi	17
2012–13	Raja CA (11)	AS FAR	(Morocco) Abderrazak Hamdallah	Olympic Club Safi	15
2013–14	MA Tétouan (2)	Raja CA	(Morocco) Zouhair Naïm (Ivory Coast) Zoumana Koné	MA Tétouan Hassania Agadir	11
2014–15	Wydad AC (18)	Olympique Khouribga	(Gabon) Malick Evouna	Wydad AC	16
2015–16	Fath Union Sport (1)	Wydad AC	(Morocco) Mahdi Naghmi	AS FAR	12
2016–17	Wydad AC (19)	Difaâ Hassani El Jadidi	(Liberia) William Jebor	Wydad AC	19
2017–18	IR Tangier (1)	Wydad AC	(Morocco) Mouhcine Iajour	Raja CA	17
2018–19	Wydad AC (20)	Raja CA	(Morocco) Mouhcine Iajour (Togo) Kodjo Fo-Doh Laba	Raja CA RS Berkane	19
2019–20	Raja CA (12)	Wydad AC	(Morocco) Brahim El Bahraoui	RC Oued Zem	16
2020–21	Wydad AC (21)	Raja CA	(Morocco) Ayoub El Kaabi	Wydad AC	18
2021–22	Wydad AC (22)	Raja CA	(Republic of the Congo) Guy Mbenza	Wydad AC	16
2022–23	AS FAR (13)	Wydad AC	(Senegal) Bouly Sambou	Wydad AC	13
2023–24	Raja CA (13)	AS FAR	(Algeria) Yousri Bouzok	Raja CA	14
2024–25	RS Berkane (1)	AS FAR	(Morocco) Houssine Rahimi	Raja CA	11
2025–26	Maghreb Fez (5)	RS Berkane	(Morocco) Soufiane Benjdida	Maghreb Fez	20

== Total Botola Pro titles won ==
Clubs in bold are competing in Botola Pro as of the 2025–26 season. (Only active clubs to this day).

Rank	Club	Winners	Runners-up	Winning seasons	Runners-up seasons
1	**Wydad AC**	22	17	1947–48, 1948–49, 1949–50, 1950–51, 1954–55, 1956–57, 1965–66, 1968–69, 1975–76, 1976–77, 1977–78, 1985–86, 1989–90, 1990–91, 1992–93, 2005–06, 2009–10, 2014–15, 2016–17, 2018–19, 2020–21, 2021–22	1939–40, 1942–43, 1945–46, 1951–52, 1957–58, 1958–59, 1971–72, 1979–80, 1981–82, 1993–94, 1996–97, 1999–00, 2001–02, 2015–16, 2017–18, 2019–20, 2022–23
2	**Raja CA**	13	12	1987–88, 1995–96, 1996–97, 1997–98, 1998–99, 1999–00, 2000–01, 2003–04, 2008–09, 2010–11, 2012–13, 2019–20, 2023–24	1965–66, 1973–74, 1985–86, 1991–92, 1992–93, 2002–03, 2004–05, 2009–10, 2013–14, 2018–19, 2020–21, 2021–22
2	**AS FAR**	13	9	1960–61, 1961–62, 1962–63, 1963–64, 1966–67, 1967–68, 1969–70, 1983–84, 1986–87, 1988–89, 2004–05, 2007–08, 2022–23	1959–60, 1970–71, 1990–91, 2003–04, 2005–06, 2006–07, 2012–13, 2023–24, 2024–25
4	**Maghreb Fez**	5	6	1964–65, 1978–79, 1982–83, 1984–85, 2025–26	1960–61, 1968–69, 1974–75, 1977–78, 1988–89, 2010–11
5	Kénitra AC	4	2	1959–60, 1972–73, 1980–81, 1981–82	1978–79, 1984–85
6	Racing Casablanca	3	2	1944–45, 1953–54, 1971–72	1961–62, 1964–65
6	Stade Marocain	3	1	1927–28, 1930–31, 1943–44	1963–64
8	**KAC Marrakech**	2	6	1957–58, 1991–92	1956–57, 1962–63, 1986–87, 1987–88, 1997–98, 1998–99
8	**Hassania Agadir**	2	—	2001–02, 2002–03	—
8	MA Tétouan	2	—	2011–12, 2013–14	—
11	**Fath Union Sport**	1	4	2015–16	1972–73, 1980–81, 2000–01, 2011–12
11	Olympique Khouribga	1	3	2006–07	1983–84, 1995–96, 2014–15
11	RS Settat	1	2	1970–71	1966–67, 1967–68
11	**RS Berkane**	1	2	2024–25	1982–83, 2025–26
11	MC Oujda	1	1	1974–75	1976–77
11	Olympique Casablanca	1	1	1993–94	1994–95
11	**IR Tangier**	1	1	2017–18	1989–90
11	Étoile Casablanca	1	—	1958–59	—
11	Raja Beni Mellal	1	—	1973–74	—
11	SCC Mohammédia	1	—	1979–80	—
11	**COD Meknès**	1	—	1994–95	—

=== By city ===
City	Championships	Clubs
Casablanca	40	Wydad AC (22); Raja CA (13); Racing Casablanca (3); Olympique Casablanca (1); Étoile Casablanca (1)
Rabat	17	AS FAR (13); Stade Marocain (3); Fath Union Sport (1)
Fez	5	Maghreb Fez (5)
Kenitra	4	Kénitra AC (4)
Marrakesh	2	KAC Marrakech (2)
Agadir	2	Hassania Agadir (2)
Tétouan	2	MA Tétouan (2)
Khouribga	1	Olympique Khouribga (1)
Oujda	1	MC Oujda (1)
Settat	1	RS Settat (1)
Beni Mellal	1	Raja Beni Mellal (1)
Mohammedia	1	SCC Mohammédia (1)
Meknes	1	COD Meknès (1)
Tangier	1	IR Tangier (1)
Berkane	1	RS Berkane (1)

=== By region ===
Region	Championships	Clubs
Casablanca-Settat	42	Wydad AC (22); Raja CA (13); Racing Casablanca (3); Olympique Casablanca (1); Étoile Casablanca (1); RS Settat (1); SCC Mohammédia (1)
Rabat-Salé-Kénitra	21	AS FAR (13); Kénitra AC (4); Stade Marocain (3); Fath Union Sport (1)
Fez-Meknes	6	Maghreb of Fez (5); COD Meknès (1)
Tangier-Tetouan-Al Hoceima	3	MA Tétouan (2); IR Tangier (1)
Marrakesh-Safi	2	KAC Marrakech (2)
Souss-Massa	2	Hassania Agadir (2)
Béni Mellal-Khénifra	2	Olympique Khouribga (1); Raja Beni Mellal (1)
Oriental	2	MC Oujda (1); RS Berkane (1)

== See also ==
- Moroccan Football League (LMFA)
- Botola Pro
- Botola Pro 2
- National
