= OC Beaulieu =

Algerian football club

Olympique Club Beaulieu shortened to OC Beaulieu is a football team from the city of Algiers and the neighborhood of same name east of El Harrach.

In the 2008–09 season the club participated in Ligue Inter-Régions de football, which was then the 3rd level of Algerian football league system, but was relegated to the lower level for the next season.

Now OCB is participating in the 5th level, Ligue Régional I after finishing 13th in 2014-2015 season.
