= Louis Andrieux =

French politician, diplomat (1840–1931)

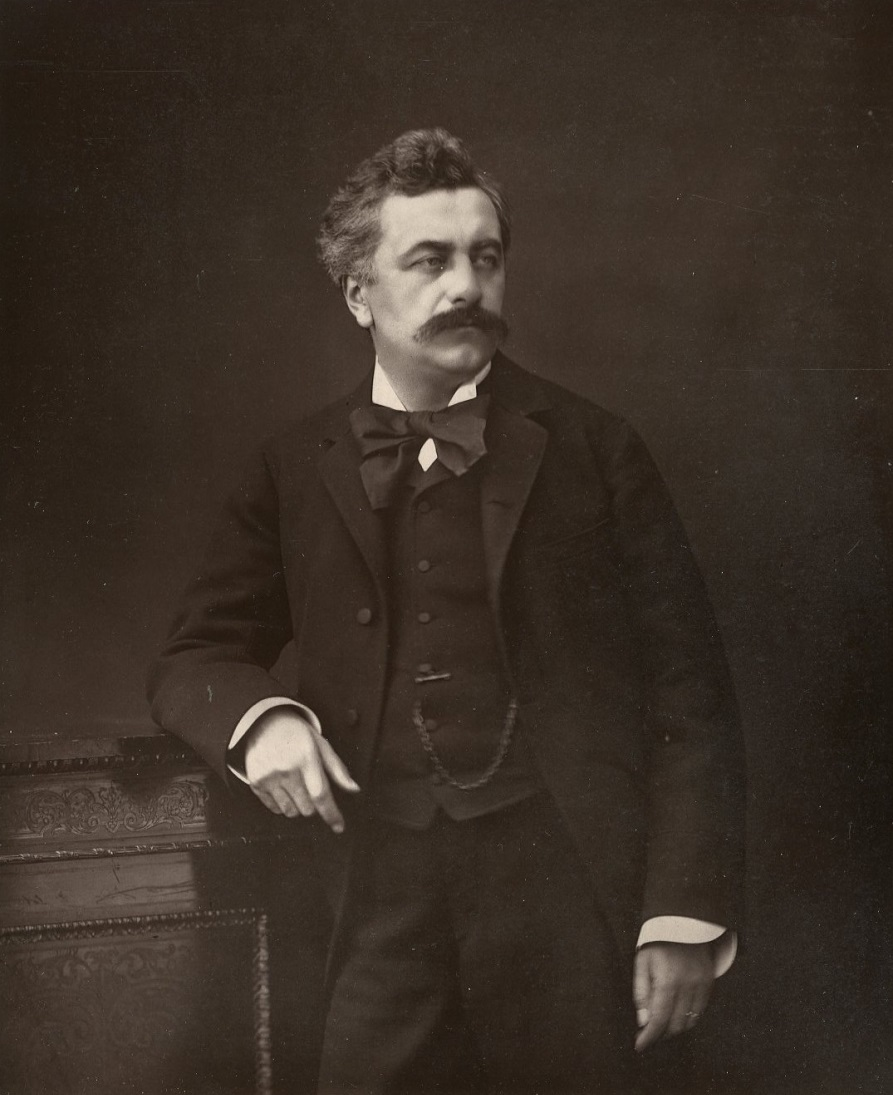
- Andrieux c. 1880

Prefect of Police of Paris
- In office 4 March 1879 – 16 July 1881
- Preceded by: Albert Gigot
- Succeeded by: Ernest Camescasse

Personal details
- Born: 23 July 1840 Trévoux, Ain, France
- Died: 26 August 1931 (aged 91) Paris, France
- Party: Republican Left (1876–1877); Democratic Republican Alliance (1877–1924)
- Spouse: Hélène Koechlin
- Children: 4, including Louis Aragon
- Occupation: Politician, diplomat, lawyer, journalist

Louis Andrieux (23 July 1840 – 26 August 1931) was a French politician, diplomat, journalist and lawyer. He served as Prefect of Police of Paris from 1879 to 1881 and was a member of the French Chamber of Deputies during several legislatures of the Third Republic. He was also the biological father of the writer and poet Louis Aragon.

== Early life and education ==
Andrieux was born in Trévoux, in the department of Ain, France. After studying at the Lycée de Lyon, he moved to Paris, where he earned a degree in literature and later studied law. During his student years, he embraced republican ideals and co-founded the short-lived weekly newspaper Le Travail in 1861 alongside Georges Clemenceau and other young intellectuals of the Latin Quarter. After completing his legal studies, Andrieux was admitted to the Lyon bar and became a Freemason.

== Political career ==
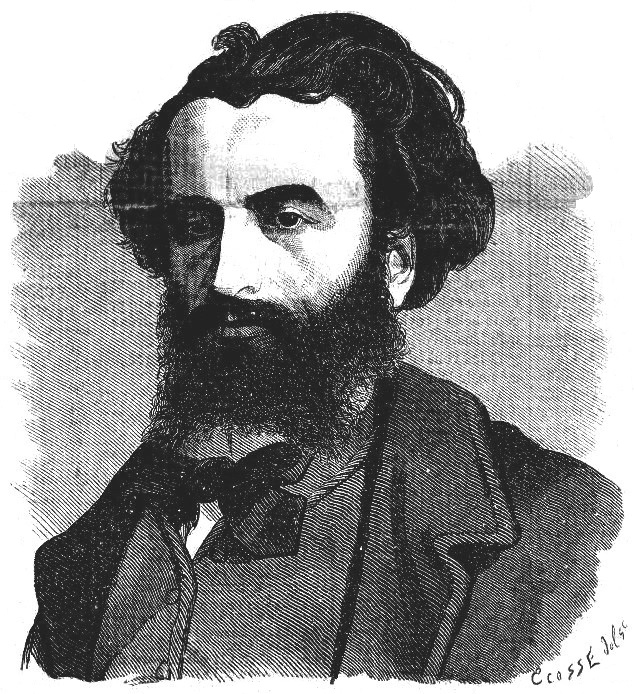
Andrieux in 1870

Following the outbreak of unrest after the French defeat in the Battle of Sedan, Andrieux was imprisoned at Prison Saint-Paul for insulting the emperor Napoleon III in 1870. He was then freed by the rioters and served as a public prosecutor in Lyon. He subsequently participated in the suppression of the Lyon Commune of April 1871, which occurred in the aftermath of the Paris Commune.

In 1879, after the electoral victory of the republicans, Andrieux was appointed Prefect of Police of Paris. During his tenure, he gained a reputation for firmness and administrative efficiency, notably during the Hartmann Affair. Lev Hartmann, a Russian revolutionary accused of involvement in a plot to assassinate Tsar Alexander II, was arrested on Andrieux's orders at the request of the Russian government, triggering a diplomatic controversy between France and Russia.

Alongside his political activities, Andrieux was active in journalism. In 1876, he founded Le Petit Parisien, which became one of the most widely circulated newspapers of the French Third Republic. He later collaborated with Clemenceau's newspaper La Justice and directed several other publications.

Andrieux served briefly as French ambassador to Spain between 1881 and 1882. He was elected deputy for the Rhône in 1876 and later represented the Basses-Alpes in the Chamber of Deputies. After an unsuccessful period in national politics during the 1890s, he returned to Parliament in 1910 as deputy for Forcalquier, serving until 1924.

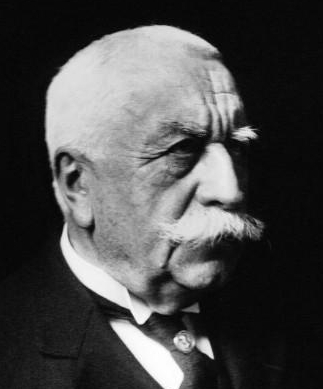
Andrieux in 1913

During the period of the French protectorate in Morocco, Andrieux was involved in the development of sport in Casablanca. In 1913, he founded US Marocaine, one of the earliest multi-sport clubs in Morocco.

== Personal life ==
In April 1878, Andrieux married Hélène Koechlin. He was also the father of the future writer Louis Aragon, born from his relationship with Marguerite Toucas-Massillon. Aragon was not officially recognised by Andrieux during his lifetime.

In 1927, at the age of eighty-seven, Andrieux completed two doctoral theses at the Sorbonne, one devoted to Alphonse Rabbe and the other to Pierre Gassendi.

He died in Paris on 26 August 1931 at the age of 91. He was buried at Passy Cemetery.

== Honours ==
- Knight of the Legion of Honour (1882)

== Sources ==
- Moissonnier, Maurice (1972). La Première Internationale et la Commune à Lyon : 1865–1871, spontanéisme, complots et luttes réelles (in French). Paris: Éditions sociales.
- Mouthier, Maurice (2007). Louis Andrieux et les deux Aragon: Un aventurier du XIXe siècle (in French). Lyon: Aléas. ISBN 978-2-84301-196-2.
