= CDJ Oran =

Algerian sports club

- Full name: Club de Derb Jeunesse نادي الدرب الشبيبة
- Nickname(s): CDJ, Le Doyen
- Founded: 14 April 1894 (131 years ago) as Club des Joyeusetés; Refounded 1990 as Club de Derb Jeunesse d'Oran
- Ground: Stade Allal Toula; Oran, Algeria
- Capacity: 5,000
- League: Ligue of Oran - Group B
Home colours	Away colours

Club de Derb Jeunesse d'Oran, (Arabic: نادي الدرب الشبيبة لوهران) known as CDJ Oran or simply CDJ for a short is an Algerian multisports club founded in 1894 in Oran and play in the Ligue of Oran - Group B. It's the oldest omnisports club in Algeria and North Africa. The club colours are blue and black. The CDJ is also the first club to win the North African Football Cup in 1930–31.

== History ==
The multisports club was founded on April 14, 1894, by the European settlers in the neighbourhood El-Derb of Oran under the name of Club des Joyeusetés. The football section was created on July 10, 1897. The club was dissolved in 1962 after the independence of Algeria and the departure of the Europeans.

After the Independence of Algeria, the football section was resurrected in the 1990s in El-Derb by young Algerians from Oran under the name of Club de Derb Jeunesse, also called Club des Jeunes. Currently the club plays in the lower divisions of the league of Oran in Ligue of Oran - Group B.

== Stadiums ==
The football club played at the Stade de Turin in the neighbourhood Gambetta until the construction of the Stade Étienne Gay in the same district better known as the Stade Gay (it will be renamed after independence Stade Kaddour Keloua). The club play now in Stade Allal Toula in the neighbourhood Hai Mahieddine (ex. Eckmühl).

== Achievements ==
=== National ===
- League of Oran

Champion (8): 1913–14, 1929–30, 1930–31, 1933–34, 1936–37, 1937–38, 1938–39, 1941–42

- League of Oran (FNAFA)

Champion (1): 1927–28

- Oran Cup (FNAFA)

Champion (3): 1926–27, 1927–28, 1928–29

=== Regional ===
- North African Championship

Champion (1): 1931
Runner-up (2): 1937, 1942

- North African Cup

Champion (4): 1931, 1933, 1934, 1935
Runner-up (1): 1942
