= Georges Janin =

French footballer and manager (1910–1974)

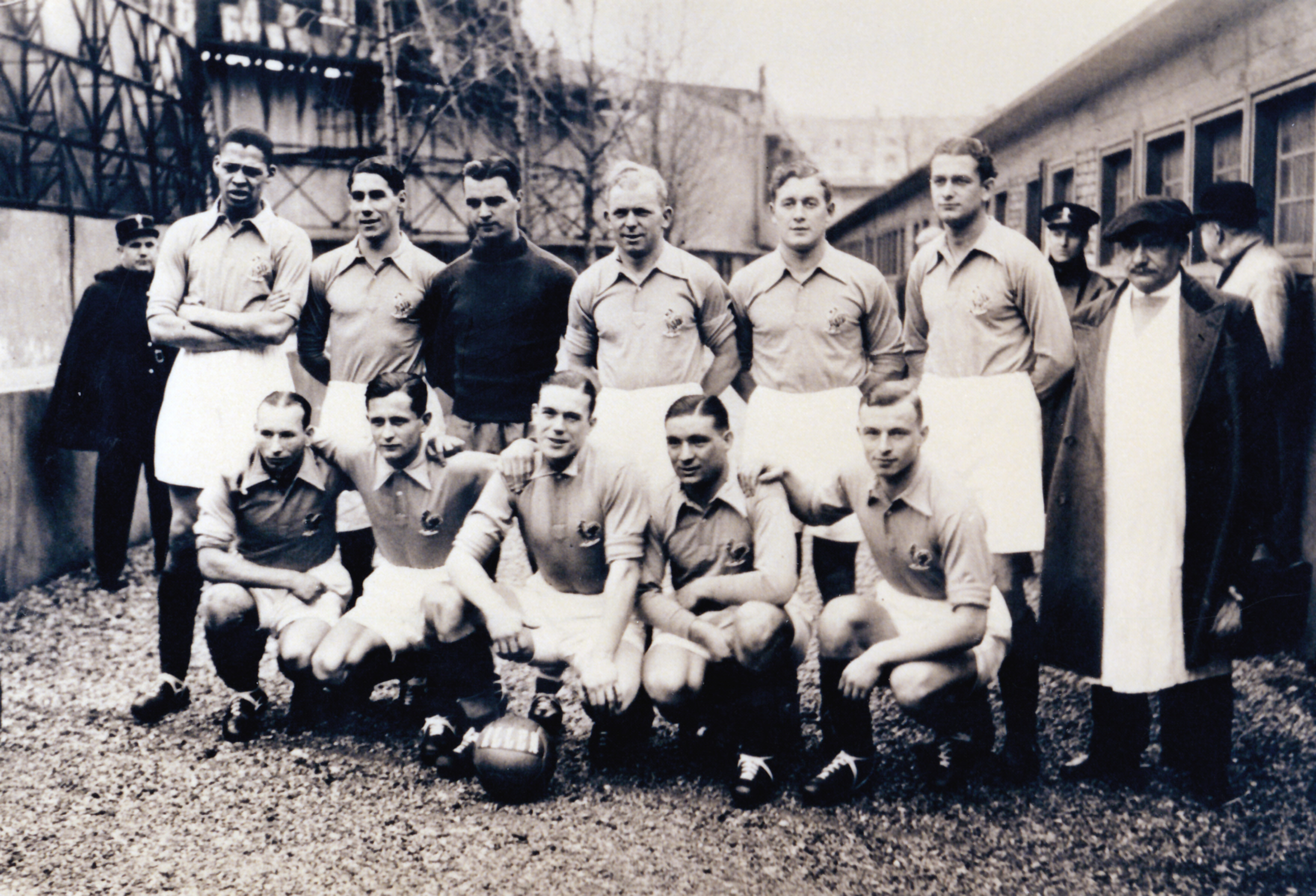
- Janin (crouching, second from right) in 1937

Personal information
- Date of birth: 15 November 1910
- Place of birth: Aïn M'lila, Algeria
- Date of death: 29 July 1974 (aged 63)
- Place of death: Marseille, France
- Height: 1.72 m (5 ft 8 in)
- Position: Midfielder

Senior career*
| Years | Team | Apps | (Gls) |
| 1925–1934 | US Marocaine | | |
| 1934–1935 | Olympique Alès | | |
| 1935–1936 | Olympique de Marseille | | |
| 1936–1937 | Red Star | | |
| 1937–1939 | RC Roubaix | | |
| 1939–1942 | USA Perpignan | | |
| 1942–1943 | Grenoble | | |
| 1943–1944 | Montpellier-Languedoc | | |
| 1944–1945 | Nîmes Olympique | | |
| 1945–1946 | Girondins de Bordeaux | | |
| 1946–1947 | USA Perpignan | | |

International career
| 1937 | France | 1 | (0) |

Managerial career
- 1962–1963: Rodez
- * Club domestic league appearances and goals

Georges Janin (15 November 1910 – 29 July 1974) was a French footballer who played as a midfielder for Olympique de Marseille, Red Star, and RC Roubaix in the mid-1930s. He also made one appearance for the French national team in 1937.

== Playing career ==
Born on 15 November 1910 in Aïn M'lila, Algeria, Janin began his football career at US Marocaine in 1925, aged 15, where he slowly established himself as an undisputed starter, playing a crucial role in the great US Marocaine team of the early 1930s, which won a three-peat of Moroccan Championships and North African Championships between 1932 and 1934. He stayed there for nearly a decade, until 1934, when he moved to France. Unlike in Algeria, he failed to settle in one club; during his career in France, between 1934 and 1947, he never stayed at one club for more than three years, starting this run with three consecutive one-season stints at Olympique Alès (1934–35), Olympique de Marseille (1935–1936), and Red Star (1936–37). At OM, he scored a total of 3 goals in 26 official matches.

On 24 January 1937, the 26-year-old Janin earned his first (and only) international cap for France in a friendly match against Austria at the Parc des Princes, which ended in a 1–2 loss. The following day, the journalists of the French newspaper L'Auto (currently known as L'Équipe) stated that he "played better in the first half than after the restart; he had a few shots that narrowly missed the goal and made some good moves".

Janin went on to play for the likes of RC Roubaix (1937–39), USA Perpignan (1939–42), Grenoble (1942–43), Montpellier-Languedoc (1943–44), Nîmes Olympique (1944–45), Girondins de Bordeaux (1945–46), before returning to USA Perpignan, where he retired in 1947, aged 37.

== Managerial career ==
After retiring, Janin remained linked to football, now as a manager of Rodez. His son Claude also held this position in Rodez, first with the youth team and later with the senior.

== Death ==
Janin died in Marseille on 29 July 1974, at the age of 63.

== Honours ==
US Marocaine

- North African Championship
  - Champions (3): 1932, 1933, and 1934
- Moroccan Championship:
  - Champions (3): 1932, 1933, and 1934
