= Algerian football league system =

Series of interconnected leagues

- Country: Algeria
- Sport: Association football
- Promotion and relegation: Yes

National system
- Federation: Football Association
- Confederation: CAF
- Top division: Algerian Ligue Pro. 1
- Second division: Algerian Ligue 2
- Cup competition: Algerian Cup; Algerian Super Cup

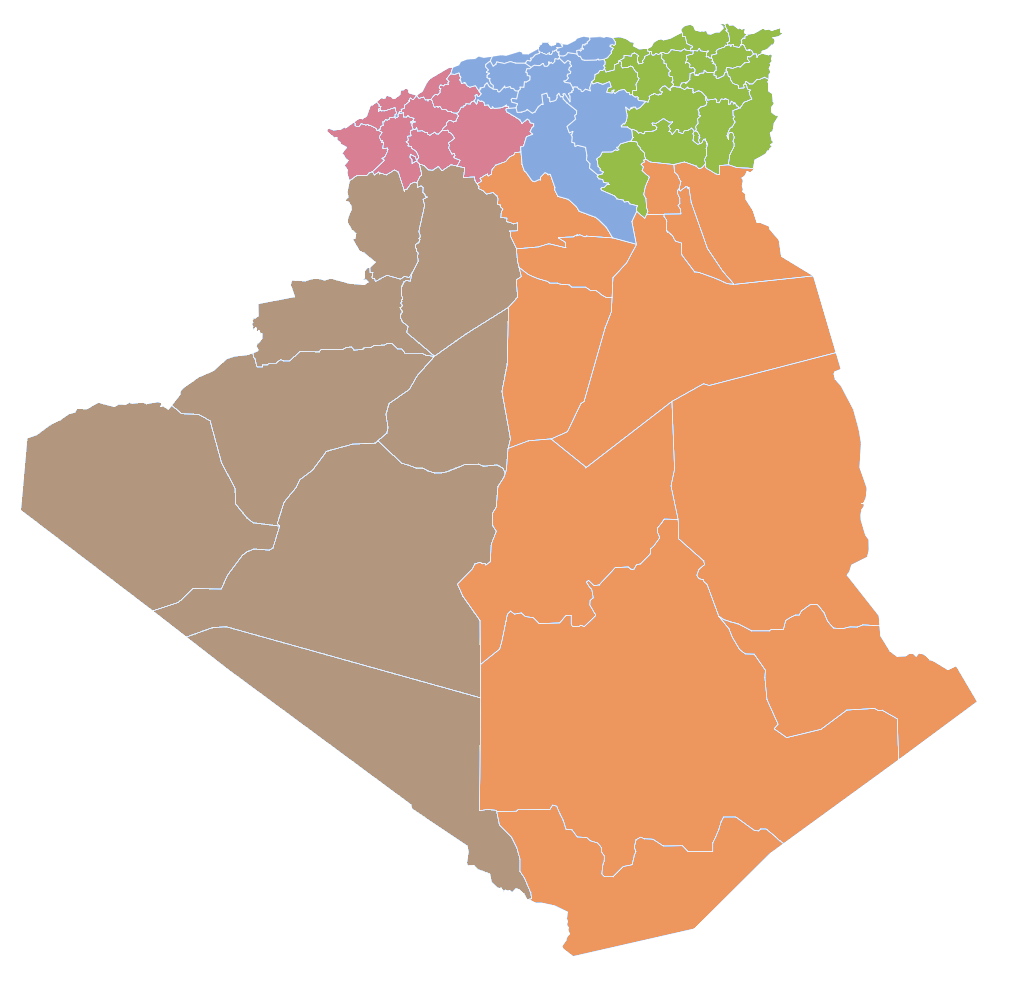
Algeria football regions.

The Algerian football league system is a series of interconnected leagues for football clubs in Algeria.

== Structure ==
There is one professional division in the country (Ligue 1), which is for men alone. All other tiers for men and the entire structure for women, operate on an amateur or semi-professional basis.

== Men ==
=== National leagues ===
Level	League(s) / Division(s)			
1	Algerian Ligue Professionnelle 1; 16 clubs ↓ relegate 3			
2	Algerian League 2 - Group Centre-west; 16 clubs ↑ promote 1,5 // ↓ relegate 3		Algerian League 2 - Group Centre-east; 16 clubs ↑ promote 1,5 // ↓ relegate 3	
3	Interregional – Group West; 16 clubs ↑ promote 1 // ↓ relegate 2	Interregional – Group Centre West; 16 clubs ↑ promote 1 // ↓ relegate 2	Interregional – Group Centre East; 16 clubs ↑ promote 1 // ↓ relegate 2	Interregional – Group East; 16 clubs ↑ promote 1 // ↓ relegate 2
3	Interregional – Group South West; 16 clubs ↑ promote 1 // ↓ relegate 1		Interregional – Group South East; 16 clubs ↑ promote 1 // ↓ relegate 1	

=== Regional leagues ===
Leagues	Level 4	Level 5
Algiers	Regional I	Regional II – Group A
Algiers	Regional I	Regional II – Group B
Algiers	Regional I	Regional II – Group C
Annaba	Regional I	Regional II – Group A
Annaba	Regional I	Regional II – Group B
Batna	Regional I	Regional II – Group A
Batna	Regional I	Regional II – Group B
South-West (Béchar)	Regional I A	Regional II – Group A
South-West (Béchar)	Regional I B	Regional II – Group B
Blida	Regional I	Regional II – Group A
Blida	Regional I	Regional II – Group B
Constantine	Regional I	Regional II – Group A
Constantine	Regional I	Regional II – Group B
Oran	Regional I	Regional II – Group A
Oran	Regional I	Regional II – Group B
Ouargla	Regional I A	Regional II – Group A
Ouargla	Regional I A	Regional II – Group B
Ouargla	Regional I B	Regional II – Group C
Ouargla	Regional I B	Regional II – Group D1
Ouargla	Regional I B	Regional II – Group D2
Saïda	Regional I	Regional II – Group A
Saïda	Regional I	Regional II – Group B

=== Wilaya (Departmental) leagues ===
==== West region ====
Oran
Leagues	Level 6	Level 7
Aïn Témouchent	Wilaya – Honor	Wilaya – Pre-Honor
Mostaganem	Wilaya – Honor	Wilaya – Pre-Honor
Oran	Wilaya – Honor	Wilaya – Pre-Honor
Relizane	Wilaya – Honor	Wilaya – Pre-Honor
Sidi Bel Abbès	Wilaya – Honor	Wilaya – Pre-Honor
Tlemcen	Wilaya – Honor	Wilaya – Pre-Honor

Saïda
Leagues	Level 6	Level 7
Mascara	Wilaya – Honor	Wilaya – Pre-Honor
Saïda	Wilaya – Honor	Wilaya – Pre-Honor
Tiaret	Wilaya – Honor	Wilaya – Pre-Honor
Tissemsilt	Wilaya – Honor	Wilaya – Pre-Honor

==== Centre region ====
Algiers
Leagues	Level 6	Level 7
Algiers	Wilaya – Honor	Wilaya – Pre-Honor
Béjaïa	Wilaya – Honor	Wilaya – Pre-Honor
Bouira	Wilaya – Honor	Wilaya – Pre-Honor
Boumerdès	Wilaya – Honor	Wilaya – Pre-Honor
Tizi Ouzou	Wilaya – Honor	Wilaya – Pre-Honor

Blida
Leagues	Level 6	Level 7
Aïn Defla	Wilaya – Honor	Wilaya – Pre-Honor
Blida	Wilaya – Honor	Wilaya – Pre-Honor
Chlef	Wilaya – Honor	Wilaya – Pre-Honor
Djelfa	Wilaya – Honor	Wilaya – Pre-Honor
Médéa	Wilaya – Honor	Wilaya – Pre-Honor
Tipaza	Wilaya – Honor	Wilaya – Pre-Honor

==== East region ====
Annaba
Leagues	Level 6	Level 7
Annaba	Wilaya – Honor	Wilaya – Pre-Honor
Guelma	Wilaya – Honor	Wilaya – Pre-Honor
Souk Ahras	Wilaya – Honor	Wilaya – Pre-Honor
Tébessa	Wilaya – Honor	Wilaya – Pre-Honor
El Tarf	Wilaya – Honor	Wilaya – Pre-Honor

Batna
Leagues	Level 6	Level 7
Batna	Wilaya – Honor	Wilaya – Pre-Honor
Biskra	Wilaya – Honor	Wilaya – Pre-Honor
Bordj Bou Arréridj	Wilaya – Honor	Wilaya – Pre-Honor
Khenchela	Wilaya – Honor	Wilaya – Pre-Honor
M'Sila	Wilaya – Honor	Wilaya – Pre-Honor

Constantine
Leagues	Level 6	Level 7
Constantine	Wilaya – Honor	Wilaya – Pre-Honor
Jijel	Wilaya – Honor	Wilaya – Pre-Honor
Mila	Wilaya – Honor	Wilaya – Pre-Honor
Oum El Bouaghi	Wilaya – Honor	Wilaya – Pre-Honor
Sétif	Wilaya – Honor	Wilaya – Pre-Honor
Skikda	Wilaya – Honor	Wilaya – Pre-Honor

==== South-West region ====
Béchar
Leagues	Level 6
Adrar	Wilaya – Honor
Béchar	Wilaya – Honor
Tindouf	Wilaya – Honor
El Bayadh	Wilaya – Honor
Nâama	Wilaya – Honor

==== South-East region ====
Ouargla
Leagues	Level 6	Level 7
El Oued	Wilaya – Honor	Wilaya – Pre-Honor
Ghardaïa	Wilaya – Honor	Wilaya – Pre-Honor
Illizi	Wilaya – Honor	Wilaya – Pre-Honor
Laghouat	Wilaya – Honor	Wilaya – Pre-Honor
Ouargla	Wilaya – Honor	Wilaya – Pre-Honor
Tamanrasset	Wilaya – Honor	Wilaya – Pre-Honor

== Women ==
=== National leagues ===
Level	League(s) / Division(s)		
1	Elite National Championship; 10 clubs		
2	National Championship D2 – Group West; 10 clubs	National Championship D2 – Group Center; 10 clubs	National Championship D2 – Group East; 10 clubs
3	National Championship D3; 19 clubs		
