= Mario Zatelli =

French footballer (1912–2004)

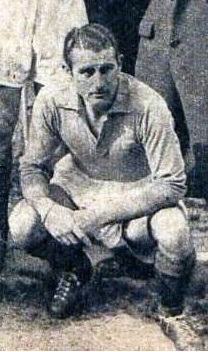
- Zatelli in 1943

Personal information
- Date of birth: 21 December 1912
- Place of birth: Sétif, French Algeria
- Date of death: 7 January 2004 (aged 91)
- Place of death: Sainte-Maxime, France
- Position: Striker

Senior career*
Years	Team	Apps	(Gls)
1929–1935	US Marocaine		
1935–1938	Marseille		
1938–1939	RC Paris		
1940–1943	Toulouse		
1943–1944	Marseille		
1945–1948	Marseille		

International career
1939	France	1	(1)

Managerial career
- 1952–1953: Nice
- 1959–1964: Nancy
- 1964–1966: Marseille
- 1968–1970: Marseille
- 1972: Marseille
- 1973: Marseille
- * Club domestic league appearances and goals

Mario Zatelli (21 December 1912 – 7 January 2004) was a French football player and manager.

Born in Sétif, Algeria and of Italian origin, he mostly played for Olympique de Marseille. He was in the roster for the 1938 FIFA World Cup; never appeared. He capped (scored 1 goal) for France in 1939. He later managed Olympique de Marseille in the 1970s and won one Ligue 1 and Coupe de France in 1972.

He died in Sainte-Maxime, Var, French Riviera, at 91 years old.

== External links and references ==
- Profile on French federation official site
