= Ligue de Football de la Wilaya =

Division of the Algerian Football League

- Founded: 1962
- Country: Algeria
- Divisions: Honneur; Pré-Honneur
- Level on pyramid: 6-7
- Promotion to: Régionale II
- Domestic cup: Algerian Cup
- Current: 2025–26 Ligue de la Wilaya

Ligue de Football de la Wilaya is a football division in Algeria consisting of various provincial leagues situated at the bottom of the Algerian football league system. Most of the leagues comprise clubs from the same wilaya and are divided into honneur (honor) and pré-honneur (pre-honor) divisions, located at the 6th and 7th tiers respectively. Each league manages its own championship(s), through delegation from the Algerian Football Federation. 47 of 58 wilayas have their league. The ones without a league are Tindouf and the 10 new wilayas which were established in 2019 (Bordj Badji Mokhtar, Ain Salah, Djanet, Ain Guezzam, El M'Ghair, Touggourt, Béni Abbès, Timimoun, Ouled Djellal, El Menia). The wilaya leagues are as follows:

== West region ==
Oran
Leagues	Level 6	Level 7
Aïn Témouchent	Wilaya – Honor	Wilaya – Pre-Honor
Mostaganem	Wilaya – Honor	Wilaya – Pre-Honor
Oran	Wilaya – Honor	Wilaya – Pre-Honor
Relizane	Wilaya – Honor	Wilaya – Pre-Honor
Sidi Bel Abbès	Wilaya – Honor	Wilaya – Pre-Honor
Tlemcen	Wilaya – Honor	Wilaya – Pre-Honor

Saïda
Leagues	Level 6	Level 7
Mascara	Wilaya – Honor	Wilaya – Pre-Honor
Saïda	Wilaya – Honor	Wilaya – Pre-Honor
Tiaret	Wilaya – Honor	Wilaya – Pre-Honor
Tissemsilt	Wilaya – Honor	Wilaya – Pre-Honor

== Centre region ==
Algiers
Leagues	Level 6	Level 7
Algiers	Wilaya – Honor	Wilaya – Pre-Honor
Béjaïa	Wilaya – Honor	Wilaya – Pre-Honor
Bouira	Wilaya – Honor	Wilaya – Pre-Honor
Boumerdès	Wilaya – Honor	Wilaya – Pre-Honor
Tizi Ouzou	Wilaya – Honor	Wilaya – Pre-Honor

Blida
Leagues	Level 6	Level 7
Aïn Defla	Wilaya – Honor	Wilaya – Pre-Honor
Blida	Wilaya – Honor	Wilaya – Pre-Honor
Chlef	Wilaya – Honor	Wilaya – Pre-Honor
Djelfa	Wilaya – Honor	Wilaya – Pre-Honor
Médéa	Wilaya – Honor	Wilaya – Pre-Honor
Tipaza	Wilaya – Honor	Wilaya – Pre-Honor

== East region ==
Annaba
Leagues	Level 6	Level 7
Annaba	Wilaya – Honor	Wilaya – Pre-Honor
Guelma	Wilaya – Honor	Wilaya – Pre-Honor
Souk Ahras	Wilaya – Honor	Wilaya – Pre-Honor
Tébessa	Wilaya – Honor	Wilaya – Pre-Honor
El Tarf	Wilaya – Honor	Wilaya – Pre-Honor

Batna
Leagues	Level 6	Level 7
Batna	Wilaya – Honor	Wilaya – Pre-Honor
Biskra	Wilaya – Honor	Wilaya – Pre-Honor
Bordj Bou Arréridj	Wilaya – Honor	Wilaya – Pre-Honor
Khenchela	Wilaya – Honor	Wilaya – Pre-Honor
M'Sila	Wilaya – Honor	Wilaya – Pre-Honor

Constantine
Leagues	Level 6	Level 7
Constantine	Wilaya – Honor	Wilaya – Pre-Honor
Jijel	Wilaya – Honor	Wilaya – Pre-Honor
Mila	Wilaya – Honor	Wilaya – Pre-Honor
Oum El Bouaghi	Wilaya – Honor	Wilaya – Pre-Honor
Sétif	Wilaya – Honor	Wilaya – Pre-Honor
Skikda	Wilaya – Honor	Wilaya – Pre-Honor

== South-West region ==
Béchar
Leagues	Level 6
Adrar	Wilaya – Honor
Béchar	Wilaya – Honor
Tindouf	No League
El Bayadh	Wilaya – Honor
Nâama	Wilaya – Honor

== South-East region ==
Ouargla
Leagues	Level 6	Level 7
El Oued	Wilaya – Honor	Wilaya – Pre-Honor
Ghardaïa	Wilaya – Honor	Wilaya – Pre-Honor
Illizi	Wilaya – Honor	Wilaya – Pre-Honor
Laghouat	Wilaya – Honor	Wilaya – Pre-Honor
Ouargla	Wilaya – Honor	Wilaya – Pre-Honor
Tamanrasset	Wilaya – Honor	Wilaya – Pre-Honor

Adrar	Chlef	Laghouat	Oum El Bouaghi
Batna	Bejaia	Biskra	Béchar
Blida	Bouïra	Tamanrasset	Tébessa
Tlemcen	Tiaret	Tizi Ouzou	Algiers
Djelfa	Jijel	Sétif	Saïda
Skikda	Sidi Bel Abbès	Annaba	Guelma
Constantine	Médéa	Mostaganem	M'Sila
Mascara	Ouargla	Oran	El Bayadh
Illizi	Bordj Bou Arréridj	Boumerdès	El Tarf
Tissemsilt	El Oued	Khenchela	Souk Ahras
Tipaza	Mila	Aïn Defla	Naâma
Aïn Témouchent	Ghardaia	Relizane	
