= League of Oran Football Association =

Football league in Algeria

- Founded: 1919
- Folded: 1962 due to fall of France after 38 seasons
- Country: (France) French Algeria
- Confederation: (France) FFF
- Number of clubs: varied
- Level on pyramid: 1
- Domestic cup(s): Oran Cup; Coupe de France
- Last champions: USSC Témouchent (1960–61)
- Most championships: SC Bel Abbès (15)

The League of Oran Football Association, also called League of Oran or simply LOFA for a short was an organization of soccer in Algeria to the French colonial era. Founded in 1920 in order to develop the colonial football to Oran; She paused for a moment due to World War II, then resumed in 1946. Eventually it will cease all activities in 1962 after the end of the War of Algeria who devoted the independence of the Algeria and which led to the mass exodus of settlers to France signifier abandonment of sports clubs run by the "settlers" and their structures.

Affiliated to the French Football Federation with four other leagues in North Africa that are leagues: the Algiers of Constantine of Tunisia and Morocco; League of Oran so possessed as his four sisters the status of "league" or "Championship" amateur, and had four divisions that corresponded to the seventh, sixth, fifth and fourth division of French football.

These leagues so were the main football regions in North Africa from cutting the French colonial administration. They were very structured and very hierarchical and organized competitions for all age categories in addition to a so-called "corporate" (or category Championship "corporate" or company), the highest level was called Division of Honor .

== Oran League ==
The Oran League is champions of Honor Division (DH) of the French league system. It concerne the north west of Algeria, called west of Algeria or Oranie.

=== Finals ===
==== 1ère Série - CRO / USFASA ====
| Season | Winner | Runner-up |
|---|---|---|
| 1900–01 | CA Oran | |
| 1901–02 | SC Oran | CA Oran |
| 1902–03 | SC Oran | CA Oran |
| 1903–04 | SC Oran | CA Oran |
| 1904–05 | SC Oran | |
| 1905–06 | SC Oran | |
| 1906–07 | CDJ Oran | |
| 1907–08 | CA Oran | GC Oran |
| 1908–09 | | |
| 1909–10 | | |
| 1910–11 | SC Bel Abbès | |
| 1911–12 | SC Bel Abbès | CA Oran |
| 1912–13 | SC Bel Abbès | CA Oran |
| 1913–14 | CDJ Oran | FC Oran |
| 1914–15 | canceled due to the World War I | |
| 1915–16 | CS Oran | |
| 1916–17 | CS Oran | V. Mostaganem |
| 1917–18 | | |
| 1918–19 | AS Marine d'Oran | SC Bel Abbès |
| 1919–20 | AS Marine d'Oran | SC Bel Abbès |

==== Division d'honneur LOFA / ULNAF / FFF ====
| Season | Winner | Runner-up |
|---|---|---|
| 1920–21 | AS Marine d'Oran | SC Bel Abbès |
| 1921–22 | SC Bel Abbès | AS Marine d'Oran |
| 1922–23 | SC Bel Abbès | AS Marine d'Oran |
| 1923–24 | SC Bel Abbès | AS Marine d'Oran |
| 1924–25 | SC Bel Abbès | |
| 1925–26 | SC Bel Abbès | |
| 1926–27 | SC Bel Abbès | |
| 1927–28 | SC Bel Abbès | |
| 1928–29 | AS Marine d'Oran | SC Bel Abbès |
| 1929–30 | CDJ Oran | SC Bel Abbès |
| 1930–31 | GC Oran | JP Bel Abbès |
| 1931–32 | CDJ Oran | USM Oran |
| 1932–33 | USM Oran | AS Marine d'Oran |
| 1933–34 | CDJ Oran | USM Oran |
| 1934–35 | USM Oran | SC Bel Abbès |
| 1935–36 | GC Oran | IS Mostaganem |
| 1936–37 | CDJ Oran | SC Bel Abbès |
| 1937–38 | CDJ Oran | SS Marsa |
| 1938–39^{*} | CDJ Oran | AS Marine d'Oran |
| 1939–40^{*} | AS Marine d'Oran | USM Bel Abbès |
| 1940–41^{*} | AS Marine d'Oran | USM Oran |
| 1941–42 | CDJ Oran | GC Oran |
| 1942–43^{*} | USM Oran | |
| 1943–44^{*} | USM Oran | |
| 1944–45^{*} | USM Oran | |
| 1945–46^{*} | FC Oran | CDJ Oran |
| 1946–47 | SC Bel Abbès | CDJ Oran |
| 1947–48 | FC Oran | SC Bel Abbès |
| 1948–49 | USM Oran | AS Marsa |
| 1949–50 | USM Oran | SC Bel Abbès |
| 1950–51 | GC Mascara | USM Oran |
| 1951–52 | SC Bel Abbès | USM Oran |
| 1952–53 | SC Bel Abbès | USSC Témouchent |
| 1953–54 | SC Bel Abbès | USSC Témouchent |
| 1954–55 | SC Bel Abbès | USM Oran |
| 1955–56 | SC Bel Abbès | USM Bel Abbès |

==== Division d'honneur LOFA / FFF ====
| Season | Winner | Runner-up |
|---|---|---|
| 1956–57 | SC Bel Abbès | |
| 1957–58 | SC Bel Abbès | SC Bel Abbès |
| 1958–59 | CAL Oran | SC Bel Abbès |
| 1959–60 | AS Marsa | USSC Témouchent |
| 1960–61 | USSC Témouchent | AGS Mascara |
| 1961–62 | Cancelled | |

*: No League of Oran played from 1939 to 1941 and from 1943 to 1946 because World War II (1939–1945), Critérium de Guerre Tournament in place but apparently counted for the League of Oran.
From the 1956-57 season, muslim clubs ended their participations in any competition.

=== Titles by club ===
| Rank | Club | Winners | Winning seasons |
|---|---|---|---|
| 1 | SC Bel Abbès | 15 | 1922, 1923, 1924, 1925, 1926, 1927, 1928, 1947, 1952, 1953, 1954, 1955, 1956, 1957, 1958 |
| 2 | CDJ Oran | 7 | 1930, 1932, 1934, 1937, 1938, 1939, 1942 |
| 2 | USM Oran | 7 | 1933, 1935, 1943, 1944, 1945, 1949, 1950 |
| 4 | AS Marine d'Oran | 3 | 1921, 1929, 1941 |
| 5 | GC Oran | 2 | 1931, 1936 |
| 5 | FC Oran | 2 | 1946, 1948 |
| 7 | GC Mascara | 1 | 1951 |
| 7 | CAL Oran | 1 | 1959 |
| 7 | AS Marsa | 1 | 1960 |
| 7 | USSC Témouchent | 1 | 1961 |

=== FNAFA Oran League (1925–1929) ===
In 1925 the Oran with some Oranian clubs left the Oran Football Association League (LOFA) in protest at the management of the league, they gave birth to the Federation of North African Football Association (FNAFA) whose headquarters was in Oran. The headquarters of the league will be divided between the two cities of Oran and Sidi Bel Abbès until the final and total transfer of the LOFA management to Oran in 1930.

Below the table finals:

| Season | Winner | Runner-up |
|---|---|---|
| 1925–26 | AS Marine d'Oran | |
| 1926–27 | AS Marine d'Oran | |
| 1927–28 | CDJ Oran | CA Oran |
| 1928–29 | AS Eckmühl | CDJ Oran |
