= Abdesselem Ben Mohammed =

French footballer (1926–1965)

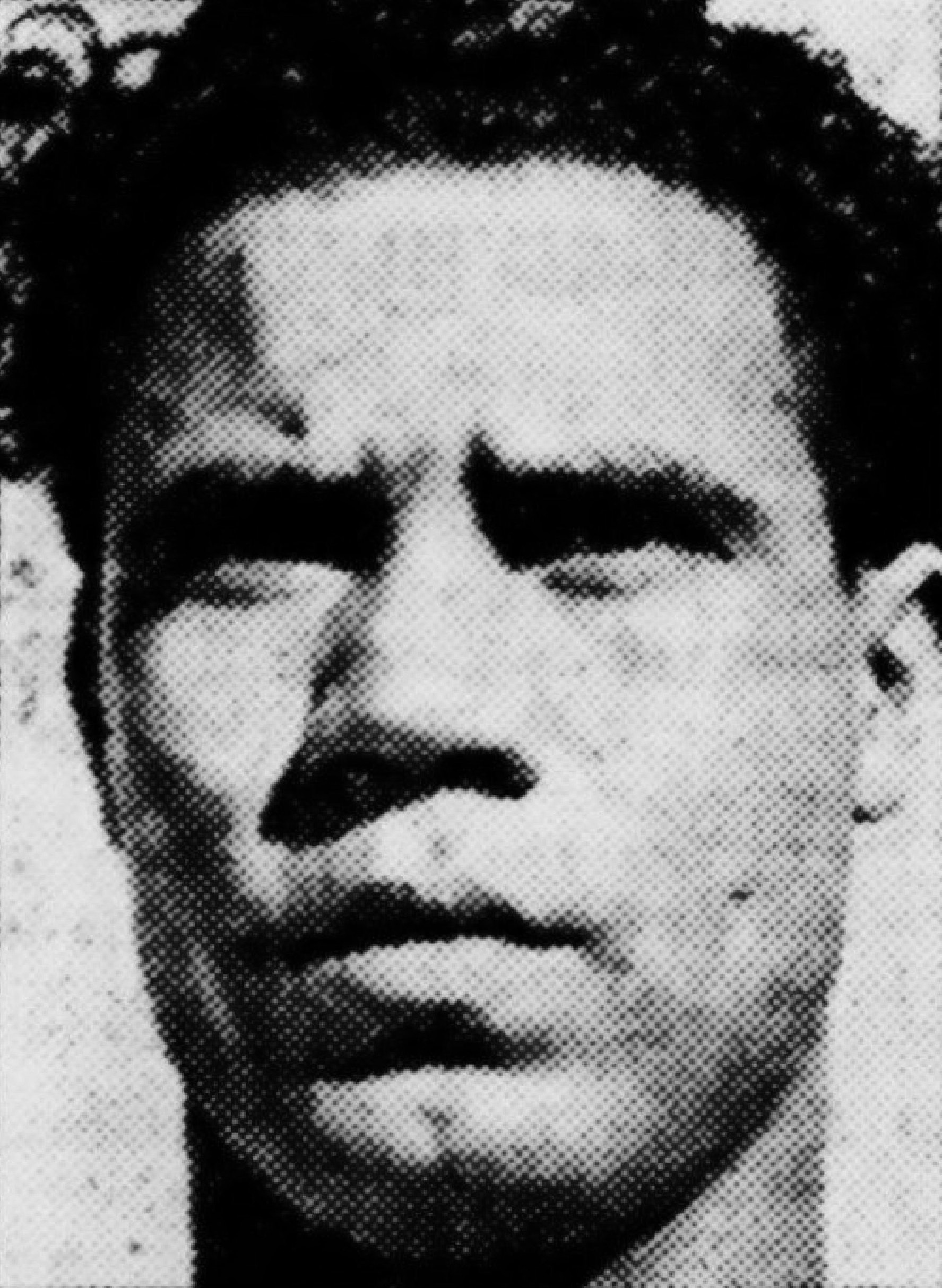

Personal information
- Date of birth: 15 June 1926
- Place of birth: Casablanca, French Morocco
- Date of death: 1 January 1965 (aged 38)
- Height: 1.81 m (5 ft 11 in)
- Position: Forward

Senior career*
Years	Team	Apps	(Gls)
1946–1952	Wydad	+115	(+96)
1952–1955	Bordeaux	87	(52)
1955–1957	Nîmes	32	(15)

International career
1953	France	1	(0)
- * Club domestic league appearances and goals

Abdesselem Ben Mohammed (15 June 1926 – 1965) was a professional footballer who played as a forward. He played for Wydad in Morocco where he won several domestic championships, before playing in France with Bordeaux and Nîmes. Born in Morocco, Ben Mohammed represented the France national team.

== International career ==
Ben Mohammed was born in the French Protectorate in Morocco. He represented the France national team in a 1–0 1954 FIFA World Cup qualification win over Ireland on 25 November 1953.

== Honours ==
Wydad

- Botola: 1947–48, 1948–49, 1949–50, 1950–51
- North African Championship: 1948, 1949, 1950
- North African Cup: 1948–49

Nîmes

- Coupe Charles Drago: 1955–56

Records

- Wydad all-time top goalscorer: 97 goals (or more)
