= Moroccan Football League (LMFA) =

- Successor: Royal Moroccan Football Federation
- Founded: 1922; 104 years ago
- Dissolved: 1956; 70 years ago
- Region served: Morocco
- Products: Honor Division; Pre-honor Division; First Division; Promotion Division
- Members: All moroccan teams

The Moroccan Football-Association League also called Moroccan Football League or simply LMFA was an organization of soccer in Morocco during the French protectate.

Affiliated to the Union of North African Leagues (ULNA) with four other leagues in North Africa that are leagues: the Constantine of Oran of Tunisia and Algiers. They were very structured and very hierarchical and organized competitions for all age categories in addition to a so-called "corporate" (or category Championship "corporate" or company), the highest level was called Division of Honor.

== Club competitions ==
=== Championship ===
Season	Winners
1922–23	Olympique Marocain
1923–24	Olympique Marocain
1924–25	US Fez
1925–26	US Fez
1926–27	USA Casablanca
1927–28	Stade Marocain
1928–29	USA Casablanca
1929–30	Olympique Marocain
1930–31	Stade Marocain
1931–32	USM Casablanca
1932–33	USM Casablanca
1933–34	USM Casablanca
1934–35	USM Casablanca
1935–36	Olympique Marocain
1936–37	Olympique Marocain
1937–38	USM Casablanca
1938–39	USM Casablanca
1939–40	USM Casablanca
1940–41	USM Casablanca
1941–42	USM Casablanca
1942–43	USM Casablanca
1943–44	Stade Marocain
1944–45	Racing AC
1945–46	USM Casablanca
1946–47	USA Casablanca
1947–48	Wydad AC
1948–49	Wydad AC
1949–50	Wydad AC
1950–51	Wydad AC
1951–52	USM Casablanca
1952–53	SA Marrakech
1953–54	Racing AC
1954–55	Wydad AC
1955–56	No completed

=== Super cup ===
The Gil/Djebbari Cup is an annual men's super cup competition in Morocco. Held between the winner of the Moroccan League against the winner of the Moroccan Cup or the Moroccan League runner-up. The competition was formerly called the "Gil Cup" from 1933 in honor of Mr. Gil, later becoming the "Djebbari Cup" from 1950 in honor of Mr. hadj Ahmed Djebbari.

- 1933 : ASPTT Casablanca
- 1934 : USM Casablanca
- 1935 : USM Casablanca
- 1936 : USM Casablanca
- 1937 : SA Marrakech
- 1938 : USM Casablanca
- 1939 : USM Casablanca
- 1940 : Wydad AC
- 1941 : USM Casablanca
- 1942 : USM Casablanca
- 1943 : USM Casablanca
- 1944 : Stade MC
- 1945 : USM Casablanca
- 1946 : Wydad AC
- 1947 : USA Casablanca
- 1948 : Wydad AC & USA Casablanca
- 1949 : Wydad AC
- 1950 : Wydad AC
- 1951 : Wydad AC
- 1952 : Wydad AC
- 1953 : USM Casablanca
- 1954 : Racing AC
- 1955 : Not-held (Wydad AC vs. KAC Marrakech)

== See also ==
- Royal Moroccan Football Federation
- Botola Pro
- List of Moroccan football champions
