= Mohamed Boussati =

Moroccan footballer

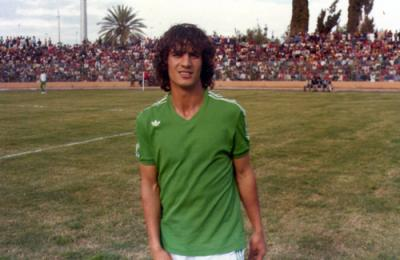

Personal information
- Date of birth: 1955 (age 70–71)
- Place of birth: Kenitra, Morocco
- Position: Forward

International career
| Years | Team | Apps | (Gls) |
| | Morocco | 21 | (10) |

Mohamed Boussati (born 1955) is a Moroccan retired footballer who played as a forward for Kénitra AC. He holds the record for the most goals scored in a single season in the Moroccan national championship (25 goals).

== Early life ==
Mohamed Boussati was born in Kenitra in 1955. From the age of ten, he began playing football with his neighborhood team. He formed the team "Hayat Saghira" with his friends. It was during a match against the KAC youth team that the public discovered Boussati. He distinguished himself as the best player of the match and, notably, as a formidable forward, scoring three goals against his future club, Kénitra AC.

== Club career ==
=== Kénitra AC ===
Boussati began his professional football career at Kénitra AC. His first match with the team was in 1972, against Casablanca's Wydad AC. He quickly became, despite his young age, the "undisputed idol" of the club's fans, emerging as an outstanding attacker. Boussati was rewarded as the top scorer during the 80/81 and 81/82 seasons. Since the 80/81 season, Boussati has been the all-time leading scorer in the national championship. He holds the record with 25 goals, despite missing eight championship matches due to injury.

Boussati's talent, discipline, and offensive strength attracted interest from top clubs both in Morocco and abroad, but he stated that the club officials prevented his departure. He has been described as an exemplary player, known for his fair play.

== Later life ==
Following his retirement from football, Boussati worked at the Water and Electricity Board in Kenitra. He has also been involved in training the junior team of his former club. In a 2012, he told Le Soir Échos that since the club began to have problems, he returned to his previous job as he was without work.

== Career statistics ==
=== International ===
Boussati scored 10 goals in 21 appearances for the Moroccan national team over a career spanning 5 years.

International appearances
| Cap | Date | Venue | Opponent | Score | Competition | Goals | Ref. |
|---|---|---|---|---|---|---|---|
| 1 | 9-1-1977 | Tunis | Tunisia | 1-1 | World Cup Qualifier | 0 | |
| 2 | 5-2-1977 | Libreville | Gabon | 1-0 | Friendly | 0 | |
| 3 | 23-3-1977 | Damascus | Syria | 2-0 | Friendly | 0 | |
| 4 | 3-4-1977 | Rabat | Gabon | 5-1 | Friendly | 2 | |
| 5 | 28-5-1977 | Dakar | Senegal | 3-2 | Friendly | 3 | |
| 6 | 9-12-1977 | Baghdad | Iraq | 0-3 | Friendly | 0 | |
| 7 | 26-12-1977 | Fez | Iraq | 0-0 | Friendly | 0 | |
| 8 | 26-2-1978 | Marrakech | Soviet Union | 2-3 | Friendly | 0 | |
| 9 | 6-3-1978 | Kumasi | Tunisia | 1-1 | African Nations Cup | 0 | |
| 10 | 9-3-1978 | Kumasi | Congo-Brazzaville | 1-0 | African Nations Cup | 0 | |
| 11 | 16-11-1980 | Fez | Zambia | 2-0 | World Cup Qualifier | 1 | |
| 12 | 30-11-1980 | Lusaka | Zambia | 0-2 | World Cup Qualifier | 0 | |
| 13 | 15-2-1981 | Fez | Syria | 3-0 | Friendly | 0 | |
| 14 | 8-3-1981 | Fez | Iraq | 1-1 | Friendly | 1 | |
| 15 | 22-3-1981 | Fez | Liberia | 3-1 | African Cup Qualifier | 1 | |
| 16 | 26-4-1981 | Casablanca | Egypt | 1-0 | World Cup Qualifier | 0 | |
| 17 | 8-5-1981 | Cairo | Egypt | 0-0 | World Cup Qualifier | 0 | |
| 18 | 16-8-1981 | Casablanca | Zambia | 2-1 | African Cup Qualifier | 1 | |
| 19 | 27-9-1981 | Kénitra | Tunisia | 2-2 | Friendly | 1 | |
| 20 | 15-11-1981 | Kénitra | Cameroon | 0-2 | World Cup Qualifier | 0 | |
| 21 | 3-10-1982 | Riyadh | Saudi Arabia | 1-2 | Friendly | 0 | |

== Honours ==
=== Kenitra AC ===
- Botola: 1972–73, 1980–1981, 1981–1982

=== Individual ===
- Top Botola scorer in 1977 (17 goals), 1981 (17 goals), and 1982 (25 goals)
