= SC Bel Abbès =

Algerian football club

SC Bel-Abbès
- Full name: Sporting Club de Bel-Abbès
- Nickname: Real of North Africa
- Founded: 1906
- Dissolved: 1962
- Ground: Stade Paul André; Sidi Bel Abbès, Algeria
- Capacity: 7,000
- Last president: ... Péri
Home colours	Away colours

Sporting Club de Bel-Abbès, known as SC Bel-Abbès or simply SCBA for a short, is a French Algerian defunct football club founded in 1906 in Sidi Bel Abbès. It's considered as the most successful North African club before 1962 under the French colonisation.

== History ==
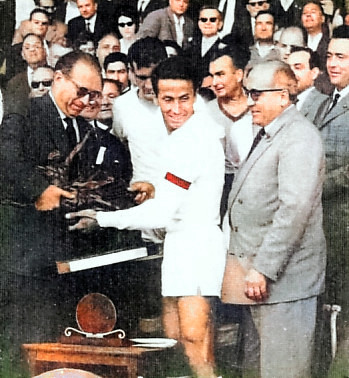
Final of Algerian Cup 1960

The club was founded in 1906 by Georges Lhermine (who became the first president of the club) and Edmond Veith in Sidi Bel Abbès. It holds the record for the most titles won in North Africa under French colonisation.

The club was dissolved in 1962 after the independence of Algeria.

== Stadium ==
The club played in Stade Paul André (ex. Stade des Oliviers). After 1962 the stadium was renamed Three Amarouch Brothers Stadium (Stade des Trois Frères Amarouch). It have a capacity of 7,000 places.

== Achievements ==
=== National ===
- League of Oran

Champion (15): 1921–22, 1922–23, 1923–24, 1924–25, 1925–26, 1926–27, 1927–28, 1946–47, 1951–52, 1952–53, 1953–54, 1954–55, 1955–56, 1956–57, 1957–58

- Algerian Championship CFA

Champion (1): 1960
Runner-up: 1961

- Algerian Cup (FFF)

Winner (3): 1958, 1959, 1960.

=== Regional ===
- North African Championship

Champion (7): 1922, 1924, 1925, 1926, 1927, 1953, 1954
Runner-up (3): 1923, 1928, 1947

- North African Cup

Champion (2): 1951, 1955
Runner-up (2): 1950, 1956

== Notable players ==
- Robert Gomez
- André Liminana
- Joseph Rodriguez
- Emmanuel Aznar
- Sauveur Rodriguez
- Slimane Benyamina
- Djillali Aber
- Joseph "Jobic" Lepage
- Amato Olmiccia
- Marion
- Serge Guttierez
- Cascalès
- Di Orio
- Georges Taillepierre
- Hubert Gros
- Saïd Amara
- Yung
- Ploner
