= Père Jégo =

Moroccan footballer (1900–1970)

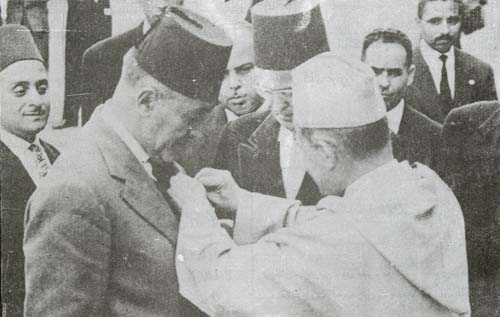
- Père Jégo being awarded by Sultan Mohammed V in 1959

Personal information
- Full name: Mohamed Ben Lahcen Affani
- Date of birth: 15 April 1900
- Place of birth: Tunis, French Tunisia
- Date of death: 31 August 1970 (aged 70)
- Place of death: Casablanca, Morocco
- Height: 1.80 m (5 ft 11 in)
- Position: Defender

Senior career*
Years	Team	Apps	(Gls)
1922–1930	US Athlétique		

Managerial career
- 1929–1936: OCS
- 1936–1938: US Athlétique
- 1939–1952: Wydad
- 1952–1956: Morocco
- 1956–1968: Raja
- * Club domestic league appearances and goals

Mohamed Ben Lahcen Affani (Arabic: محمد بن الحسن العفاني; 15 April 1900 – 31 August 1970), known as Père Jégo, was a Moroccan football manager and player who managed both Casablanca's clubs Wydad and Raja.

Père Jégo was regarded as one of the most decorated managers in Moroccan football history.

== Early life ==
Père Jégo was born in Tunis, French Tunisia. His father, Lahcen Affani Soussi, originally from the Issafen tribe in the Souss region of Morocco, moved to Tunis to trade and study at Zitouna University. His mother Jenina was Tunisian; at her death, the family returned to Morocco, when he was only five years old. In 1918, he became the first student of Moroccan origin to obtain a baccalaureate at Lycée Lyautey in Casablanca.

== Career ==
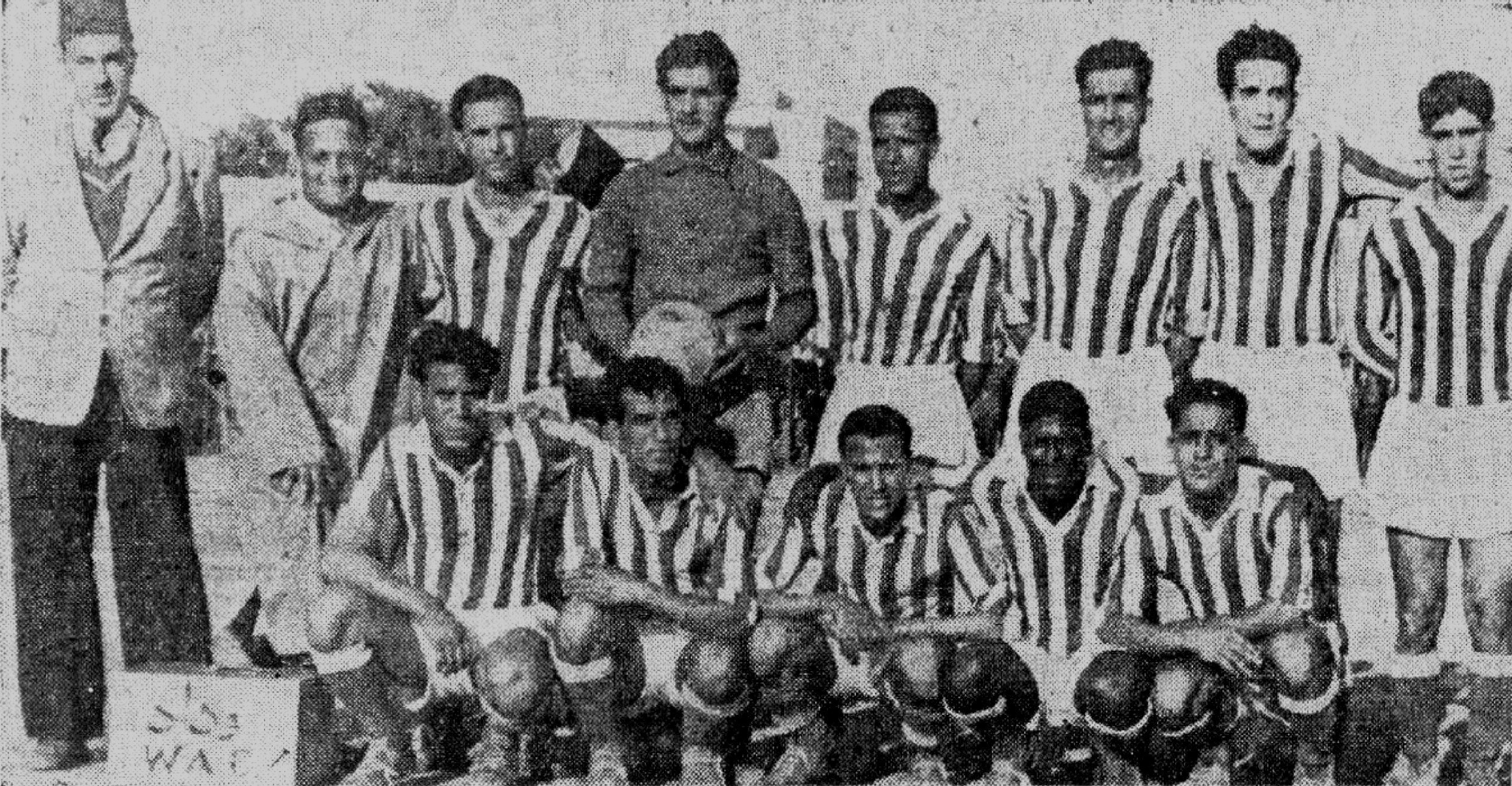
Père Jégo as coach of Wydad Athletic Club in 1950

Père Jégo played for US Athlétique from 1922 to 1930; meanwhile, he started his managerial career in 1929 with OCS. In 1939, he became the first manager for Wydad in their history. In 1952, he left Wydad to coach Morocco national team until 1956, when he joined Raja, a position he held until his retirement in 1968.

== Honours ==
=== Player ===
US Athlétique

- Moroccan League: 1926–27, 1928–29

=== Manager ===
US Athlétique

- Moroccan Cup: 1936–37

Wydad AC

- Moroccan League: 1947–48, 1948–49, 1949–50, 1950–51, 1954–55
