= North African Cup =

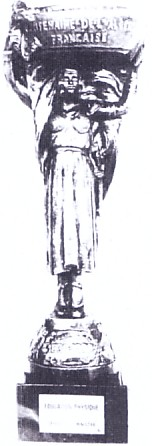
- Trophy of North African Cup (1930–1956)
- Founded: 1930
- Abolished: 1956
- Region: North Africa (Union of North-African Football Leagues)
- Last champions: (Algeria) (France) SC Bel Abbès
- Most championships: CDJ Oran (4 times)

The North African Cup is an old football competition organized in North Africa since 1930. It was dissolved after the 1956 edition.

== Records and statistics ==
=== List of finals ===
Year	Home team	Score	Away team	Venue	Attendance
1930–31; Details	(France) (Algeria); CDJ Oran	1 – 0	(France) (Algeria); GS Alger		
1931–32; Details	(France) (Algeria); RU Alger	2 – 1	(Morocco); USM Casablanca		
1932–33; Details	(France) (Algeria); CDJ Oran	2 – 1	(Morocco); USM Casablanca	Stade Alenda, Oran	
1933–34; Details	(France) (Algeria); CDJ Oran	2 – 0	(Morocco); USM Casablanca		
1934–35; Details	(France) (Algeria); CDJ Oran	4 – 2	(Morocco); USM Casablanca		
1935–36; Details	(Tunisia); Italia Tunis	1 – 0	(Morocco); Olympique Marocain		
1936–37; Details	(France) (Algeria); RU Alger	2 – 0	(France) (Algeria); GS Alger		
1937–38; Details	(Morocco); Olympique Marocain	1 – 0	(Algeria) (France); GS Alger	Stade Philip, Casablanca	
1938–39; Details	(Morocco); SA Marrakech	2 – 0	(Morocco); Stade Marocain	Stade Philip, Casablanca	
1939–40	not held (Note: The competition were cancelled because of the Second World War)				
1940–41; Details	(France) (Algeria); ASM Oran	3 – 0	(France) (Algeria); RU Alger	Stade Alenda, Oran	
1941–42; Details	(Morocco); SA Marrakech	1 – 0	(France) (Algeria); CDJ Oran	Stade Philip, Casablanca	
1942–43	not held				
1943–44	not held				
1944–45	not held				
1945–46	not held				
1946–47; Details	(Morocco); USM Casablanca	2 – 1	(France) (Algeria); Olympic Hussein Dey		
1947–48; Details	(Morocco); US Athlétique	6 – 0	(France) (Algeria); AS Saint-Eugène	Stade Philip, Casablanca	
1948–49; Details	(Morocco); Wydad AC	2 – 1	(Morocco); US Athlétique	Stade Philip, Casablanca	
1949–50; Details	(France) (Algeria); AS Saint-Eugène	4 – 3	(France) (Algeria); SC Bel-Abbès	Stade Vincent Monréal, Oran	20,000
1950–51; Details	(France) (Algeria); SC Bel-Abbès	1 – 0	(Morocco); Wydad AC	Stade Philip, Casablanca	
1951–52; Details	(France) (Algeria); FC Blida	3 – 1	(Morocco); Racing AC		
1952–53; Details	(Morocco); USM Casablanca	2 – 0	(Morocco); Wydad AC	Stade Philip, Casablanca	
1953–54; Details	(France) (Algeria); USSC Témouchent	1 – 0	(France) (Algeria); USM Oran	Stade Vincent Monréal, Oran	20,000
1954–55; Details	(France) (Algeria); SC Bel-Abbès	5 – 2 (aet)	(France) (Algeria); GS Alger	Stade Vincent Monréal, Oran	20,000
1955–56; Details	(France) (Algeria); SC Bel-Abbès	not played (Note: USMBA refused to play after the captain of SCBA had been cleared to play the match in spite of his expulsion in an earlier match)	(France) (Algeria); USM Bel-Abbès		

== Performance by club ==
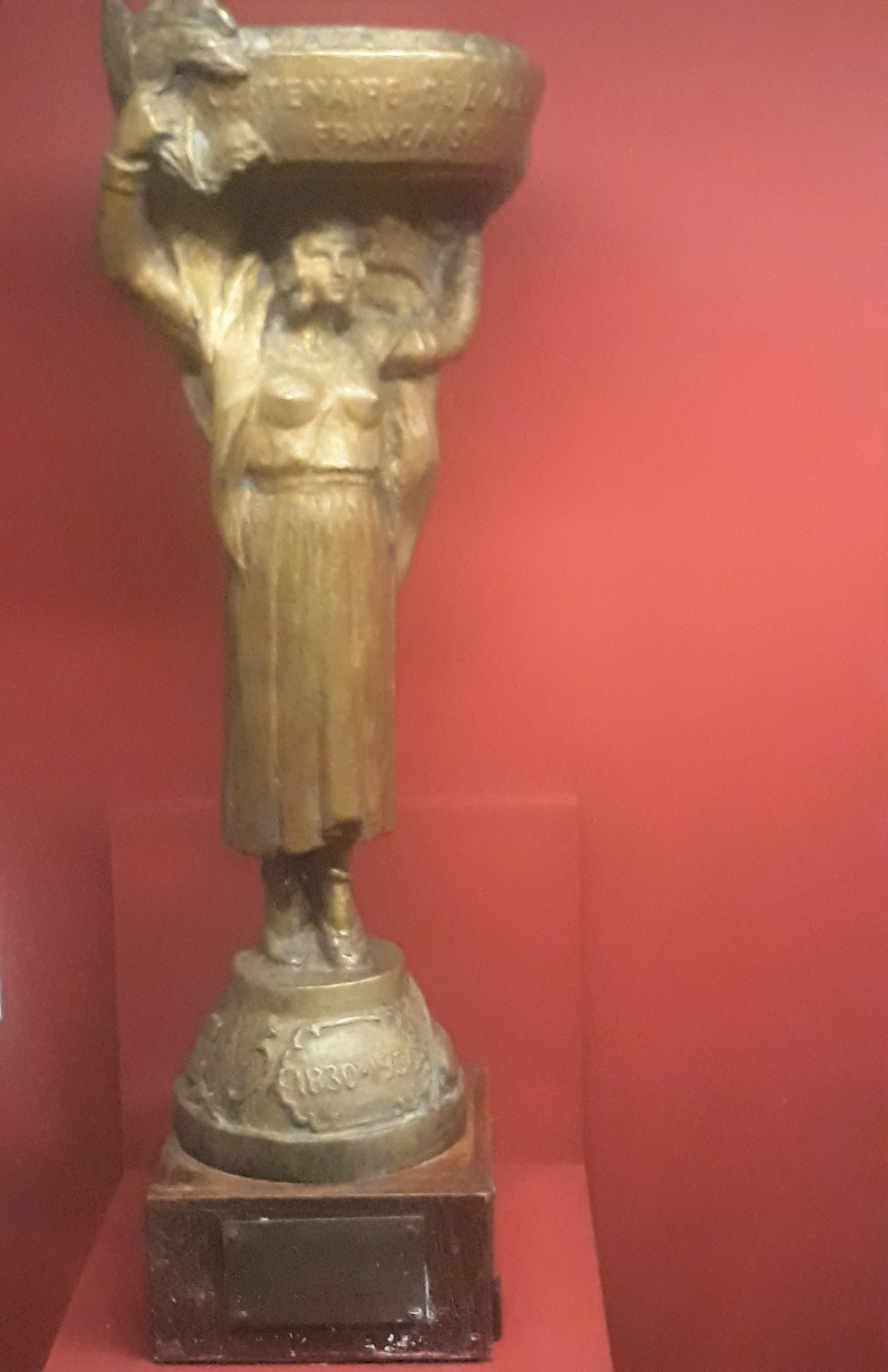
The trophy of North African Cup

Num	Club	Winners	Runners-up
1	(Algeria) (France) CDJ Oran	4 (1931, 1933, 1934, 1935)	1 (1942)
2	(Morocco) USM Casablanca	2 (1947, 1953)	4 (1932, 1933, 1934, 1935)
3	(Algeria) (France) SC Bel Abbès	2 (1951, 1955)	2 (1950, 1956*)
4	(Algeria) (France) RU Alger	2 (1932, 1937)	0
4	(Morocco) SA Marrakech	2 (1939, 1942)	0
6	(Morocco) Wydad AC	1 (1949)	2 (1951, 1953)
7	(Morocco) ISO Marocaine (Casablanca)	1 (1938)	1 (1936)
7	(Morocco) US Athlétique Casablanca	1 (1948)	1 (1949)
7	(Algeria) (France) AS Saint-Eugène (Algiers)	1 (1950)	1 (1948)
10	(Tunisia) Italia de Tunis	1 (1936)	0
10	(Algeria) (France) AS Marine Oran	1 (1941)	0
10	(Algeria) (France) FC Blidéen	1 (1952)	0
10	(Algeria) (France) USSC Témouchent	1 (1954)	0
15	(Algeria) (France) Gallia Sports d'Alger	0	4 (1931, 1937, 1938, 1955)
16	(Morocco) Stade Marocain	0	1 (1939)
16	(Algeria) (France) Olympique Hussein Dey	0	1 (1947)
16	(Morocco) Racing AC Casablanca	0	1 (1952)
16	(Algeria) (France) USM Oran	0	1 (1954)
16	(Algeria) (France) USM Bel-Abbès	0	1 (1956*)

* Match not played

=== Performance by nation ===
Num	League	Winners	Runners-up
1	(Algeria) (France) Oran department	8	3
2	Morocco	7	10
3	(Algeria) (France) Algiers department	4	7
4	Tunisia	1	0
5	(Algeria) (France) Constantine department	0	0

In the 1955/56 edition, two teams from the department of Oran went to the final; however it was not played. So normally the department of Oran is ranked in the first place with 8 winners and four runners-up.

== North African Friendship Cup ==
The North-African Friendship Cup pits the winner of the North-African Cup and his runner-up against the winner of North African Championship and his runner-up.

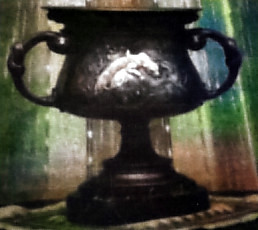
Champions of the Super Cup (ULNA).

- 1931 : CDJ Oran (Won double)
- 1932 : RU Alger 3-0 USM Oran
- 1933 : US Moroccan 4-1 CDJ Oran
- 1934 : US Moroccan 2-1 CDJ Oran
- 1935 : RU Alger 3-2 GC Oran
- 1936 : GC Oran 1-1 RU Alger
- 1937 : GS Alger 2-1 CDJ Oran
- 1938 : JAC Bône 2-1 OM Rabat
- 1939 : RU Alger 2-0 SA Marrakech
- 1940-1941 : Not held
- 1942 : US Moroccan (bat) SA Marrakech
- 1943-1946 : Not held
- 1947 : US Athlétique (bat) US Moroccan
- 1948 : Wydad AC 4-3 Racing AC
- 1949 : Wydad AC (Won double)
- 1950 : Wydad AC 2-0 USM Oran
