= US Marocaine =

Defunct Moroccan multi-sport club

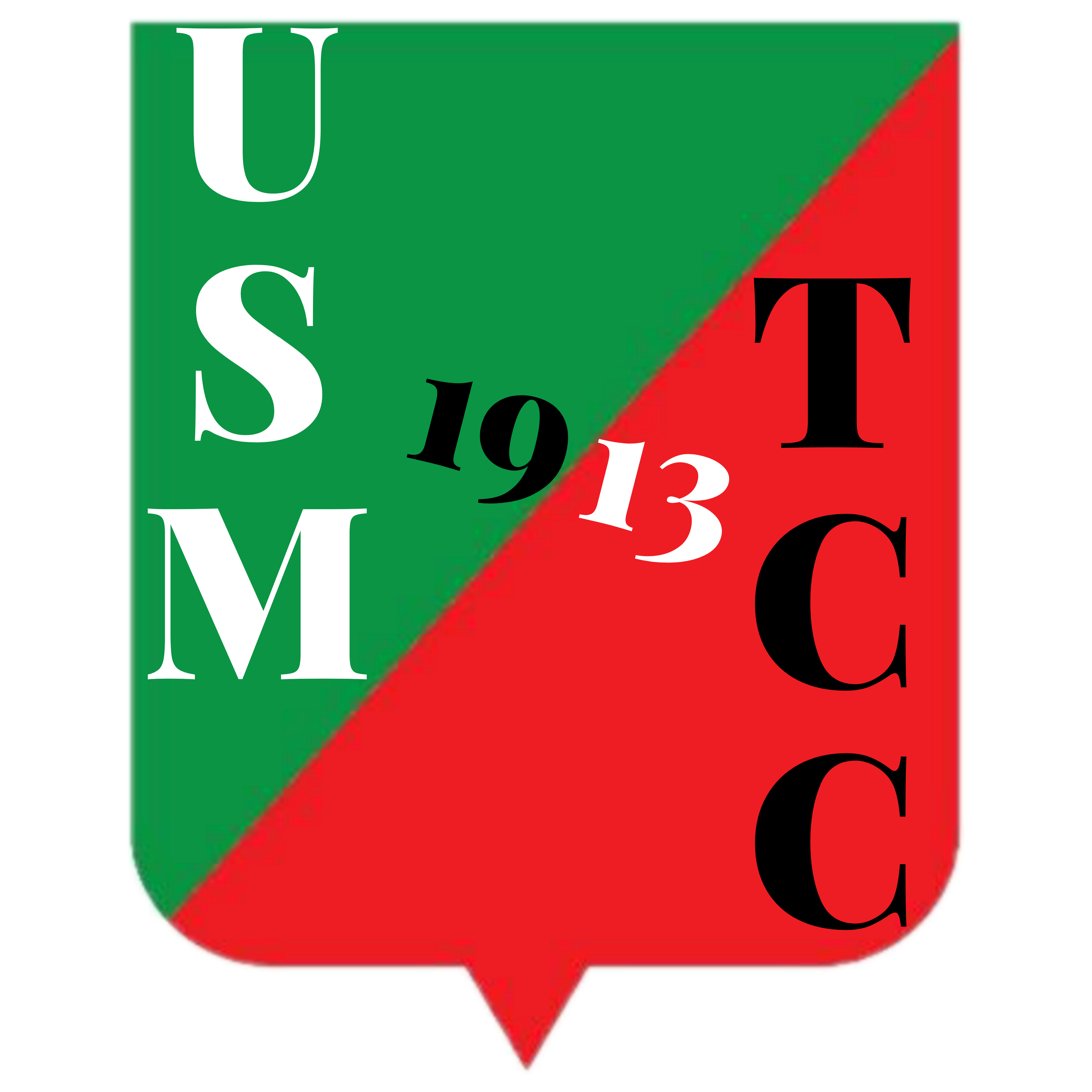
- Full name: Union Sportive Marocaine
- Nickname: l'USM; Le Monstre; Les Coqs; Usémistes
- Founded: 13 April 1913
- Dissolved: 1957 (football branch)
- Home ground: Stade Philip, Casablanca

Union Sportive Marocaine (USM) (Arabic: الاتحاد الرياضي المغربي) was a Moroccan multi-sport club based in Casablanca. Founded on April 13, 1913, by Louis Andrieux, it became one of the most successful and influential sports organizations during the French protectorate in Morocco.

USM was considered one of the pioneers of organized sport in Morocco. Established only one year after the beginning of the French Protectorate and two years before the creation of Morocco's first football championship, the club played a major role in the development of Moroccan sports. Throughout its history, USM featured several internationally renowned athletes, including Mario Zatelli, Larbi Ben Barek, Just Fontaine, and world boxing champion Marcel Cerdan.

== History ==
=== Establishment ===
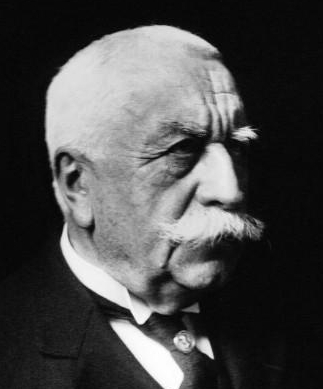
Louis Andrieux, founder of the club, in 1913

Union Sportive Marocaine (USM) was founded on April 13, 1913, initially as a multi-sport club with a rowing section. According to some sources, the football section began competing around 1915. The club was founded by Louis Andrieux and quickly became one of the symbols of colonial-era football in Morocco. Organized according to the model of European sports clubs, USM largely represented the French community in Casablanca during the Protectorate period. The Philip family contributed significantly by providing land for what became the famous Stade Philip, the club's main stadium.

== Football success ==
When Morocco's first official football championship began in 1915, USM quickly established itself as a dominant force. After the inaugural title was won by Club Athlétique Marocain, USM captured three consecutive league championships. The club enjoyed several periods of dominance throughout its history. It won four consecutive Moroccan league titles between 1932 and 1935 and later achieved an unprecedented run of seven consecutive championships from 1938 to 1944.

In 1932, during its first participation in the North African Championship, USM became the first Moroccan club to win the competition, breaking the dominance of Algerian clubs. By the time Morocco gained independence, USM had become the most successful football club of the Protectorate era, winning 15 Moroccan league championships and numerous domestic and North African trophies. Because of its extraordinary success, the club earned the nickname "The Monster of Football" throughout North Africa.

== Decline and withdrawal ==
Following Moroccan independence, USM's football team continued competing until 1958. During that period, the club faced growing difficulties and controversies. After what club officials considered unfair treatment in a Throne Cup semi-final against MC Oujda, USM protested to the Royal Moroccan Football Federation. Receiving no satisfactory response, the football section eventually withdrew from national competitions, marking the end of one of Morocco's most successful football institutions.

== Honours ==
=== National ===
- Moroccan Championship (15):
  - Champions: 1916–17, 1917–18, 1918–19, 1931–32, 1932–33, 1933–34, 1934–35, 1937–38, 1938–39, 1939–40, 1940–41, 1941–42, 1942–43, 1945–46, 1951–52
  - Runners-up: 1915–16, 1919–20, 1930–31, 1935–36, 1943–44, 1944–45, 1950–51, 1952–53
- Moroccan Cup (7):
  - Winners: 1923, 1936, 1938, 1939, 1940, 1941, 1944
  - Runners-up: 1926, 1933
- Gil/Djebbari Cup (10):
  - Winners: 1934, 1935, 1936, 1938, 1939, 1941, 1942, 1943, 1945, 1953
  - Runners-up: 1933, 1940, 1944, 1946, 1951, 1952, 1954

=== International ===
- North African Championship (5):
  - Winners: 1932, 1933, 1934, 1942, 1952
  - Runners-up: 1938, 1939, 1946
- North African Cup (2):
  - Winners: 1946–47, 1952–53
  - Runners-up: 1931–32, 1932–33, 1933–34, 1934–35
- North African Friendship Cup (3):
  - Winners: 1933, 1934, 1942
  - Runners-up: 1947

== Famous players ==
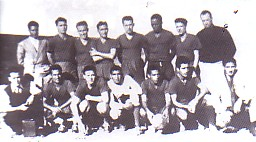
The USM starting eleven during the 1948–49 season

Several legendary footballers played for USM, including:

- (Morocco) (France) Larbi Benbarek
- (France) Just Fontaine
- (France) Georges Janin
- (Morocco) Lahcen Chicha
- (Morocco) Mohamed Naoui
- (France) Mario Zatelli

== Other sports ==
From rowing to football, as well as tennis, hockey, rugby, athletics, and table tennis, USM included around twenty sporting disciplines.

=== Basketball ===
As a multi-sport club, USM operated several sporting sections. Although the football section disappeared, the basketball section continued its activities and remains active. The club was one of the dominant forces in Moroccan basketball during the 1950s, winning six national championships, including four consecutive titles between 1952 and 1955.

National

- Division Excellence (6)
  - Champions: 1952, 1953, 1954, 1955, 1958, 1959

International

- North African Championship (4)
  - Winners: 1952, 1953, 1954, 1955
