= Driss Joumad =

Moroccan footballer (1927–2009)

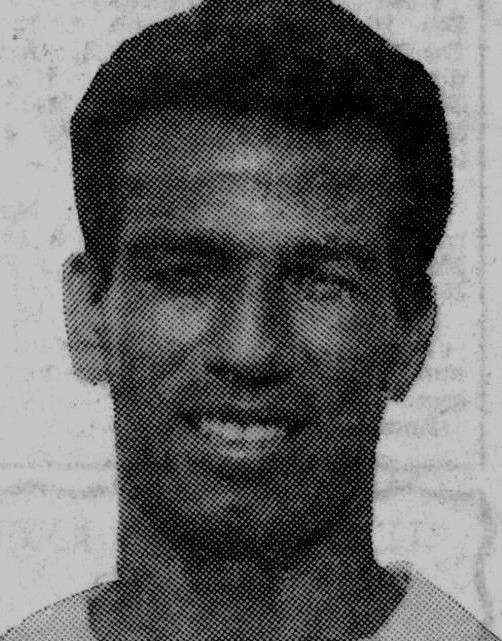

Personal information
- Full name: Driss Joumad
- Date of birth: 20 May 1927
- Place of birth: Casablanca, Morocco
- Date of death: 18 September 2009 (aged 82)
- Place of death: Rabat, Morocco
- Position: Striker

Senior career*
Years	Team	Apps	(Gls)
1944–1954	Wydad Casablanca	-	(+90)
1954–1958	Bordeaux	18	(4)

International career
–	Morocco	92	(-)
- * Club domestic league appearances and goals

Driss Joumad (20 May 1927 – 18 September 2009) is a former Morocco international football striker.

== Club career ==
Born in Casablanca, Joumad began playing football with the youth teams of Wydad Casablanca in the 1940s. He joined the senior side at age 18, and would help the club win the 1947–48 Botola title without losing a match.

In 1954, he moved to France to play for FC Girondins de Bordeaux. He made several appearances in his first season, but suffered a serious knee injury in a cup match against Le Mans which limited his ability to continue playing.

After he retired, Joumad became a football manager and led French regional side Royan Vaux AFC.

== International career ==
Joumad made 92 appearances for the Morocco national football team.

== Personal ==
Joumad died in a Rabat military hospital following a long illness at age 86.
