= Larbi Benbarek Stadium =

Multi-purpose stadium in Casablanca, Morocco

Coordinates: 33°35′44″N 7°36′30″W

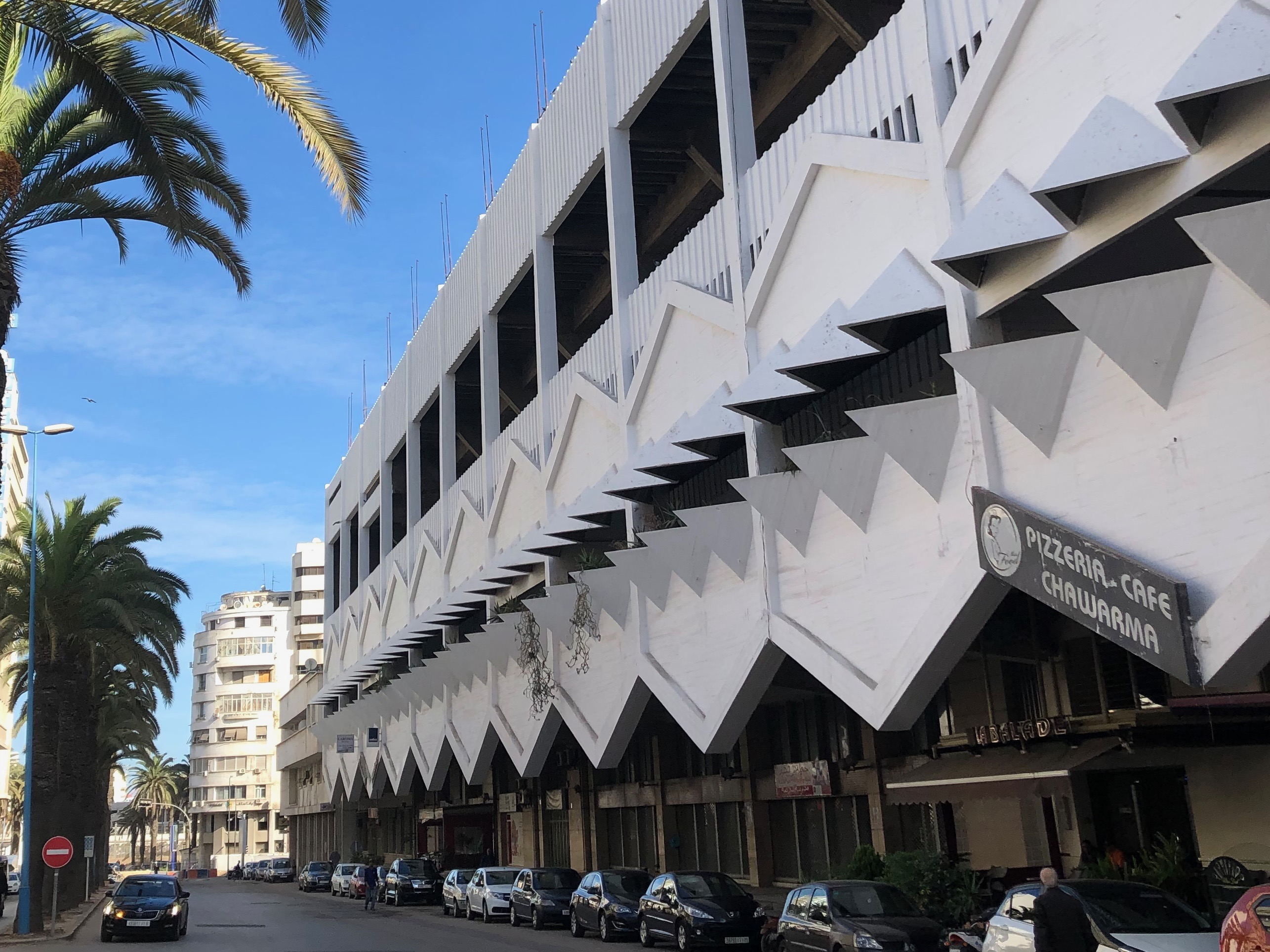
- Interactive map of Larbi Benbarek Stadium
- Location: Casablanca, Morocco
- Capacity: 20,000

Construction
- Opened: 1920
- Renovated: 2006

Tenant
- Casablanca's Majd of the Old City Club

The Larbi Benbarek Stadium, originally known as Philip Stadium, is a multi-purpose stadium in Casablanca, Morocco. It is mostly used mostly for football matches and it hosted the home matches of Casablanca's clubs until the Stade Mohamed V opened. The stadium has a capacity of 20,000 spectators. It is named after Larbi Benbarek.
