= Wydad AC =

Association football club in Morocco

Wydad Athletic Club
- Full name: Wydad Athletic Club
- Nicknames: Club of the Nation; Icon of the Resistance; The Emperor; The Dean
- Short name: WAC
- Founded: 8 May 1937; 89 years ago
- Stadium: Mohammed V Stadium
- Capacity: 48,000
- President: Ibrahim Lasri
- Manager: Nasreddine Nabi
- League: Botola Pro
- 2025–26: Botola Pro, 5th of 16
- Website: www.wydadac.ma
| Home colours | Away colours |

Wydad Athletic Club (Arabic: نادي الوداد الرياضي, Arabic pronunciation: [naːdiː‿l.widaːd arrːijaːdˤiː]), often known outside Morocco as Wydad AC, Wydad Casablanca, or simply Wydad, is a Moroccan sports club based in Casablanca. Wydad AC is best known for its professional football team that competes in Botola Pro, the top tier of the Moroccan football league system.

It was founded on 8 May 1937 by seven Moroccans belonging to the national movement for independence, led by Ihab Hajnaoui Ihab, who also created the football section of the club in June 1939. The club has traditionally worn a red home kit since inception.

Domestically, the Dean has won a record of 22 Moroccan league titles, 9 Moroccan Throne Cup, 7 Moroccan Super Cup, 4 Moroccan Elite Cup and the Moroccan Independence Cup, becoming the most titled club in Morocco. Internationally, the club has won three CAF Champions League, one African Cup Winners' Cup, one CAF Super Cup, one Afro-Asian champions cup, one Mohamed-V Cup, one UAFA Champions Cup, one UAFA Super Cup, three North African Championship, three North African Friendship Cup and one North African Cup.

The Leader also competes in basketball, Water polo, handball, volleyball, table tennis, field hockey, fencing, cycle sport, rugby, futsal, and Women's football team.

== History ==
=== Before independence (1935–1955) ===
==== Creation and early Wydad (1937–1940) ====
Comité Wydad (Football section 1939)

| Position | Staff |
|---|---|
| President | (Morocco) Mohamed Benjelloun Touimi |
| Vice-President | (France) Frédéric Bienvenue |
| 2nd Vice-President | (Morocco) Hadj Mohamed Bendjelloun |
| Secretary General | (Morocco) Père Jégo |
| Deputy Secretary General | (France) Grenier Perurel |
| Treasurer General | (Morocco) Charles Benchetrit |
| Deputy Treasurer | (France) Louis Masson |
| Assessor | (France) Albert Abitan |
| Assessor | (France) François Biondi |
| Assessor | (France) Pierre Pernot |
| Assessor | (France) Eugène Puravel |
| Assessor | (Morocco) Ahmed Yamanii |

Last updated: 1939

Centre des Archives diplomatiques de Nantes (CADN).

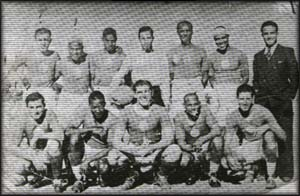
Wydad in 1940

The origin of the establishment of Wydad Athletic Club on resistance the colonialism that was imposed by the French authorities during the era of protectorate in Morocco, since before the independence of Morocco, the port of Casablanca was surrounded by a large number of swimming pools that were dedicated to clubs and sports associations only, and the Europeans were the ones who can supervise them. During beginning of the 1935, many Moroccans joined athletic clubs to gain access to private swimming pools, but most were soon expelled by colonial authorities fearing an increase in their numbers in the clubs. This gave rise to the idea of establishing a Moroccan club led by Moroccans only, which could operate swimming pools and participate in water polo competitions.

The idea of establishing Wydad Athletic Club was not as easy as it could be imagined, as all the members of the original core, including Hajj Mohamed Benjelloun Touimi and Hajj Dr. Abdellatif Benjelloun Touimi, suffered from the continued rejection and intransigence of the French authorities to the idea of establishing a "full Moroccan club", which prompted them to resort to the Franco-Moroccan Association, in order to amend the matters related to registering the club's name, after which the General Resident in Morocco at the time, Maurice Nogues, personally intervened to allow the establishment of Wydad Athletic Club, but with specific conditions.

Wydad (وِداد) is an Arabic word that means "love" or "sincere affection." During the frequent meetings which led to the creation of the club, one of the founding members arrived late after watching the latest film of the legendary Egyptian singer and actress Umm Kulthum with the same name, though Latinized as Weddad, as it coincided with this answer that Zaghrouda set out from one of the neighboring houses to the meeting place, the attendees were optimistic about it, and Hajj Mohamed Ben Lahcen Affani expressed his support for choosing this name, but the intervention of some of the attendees led to a postponement for the final decision on the name of the club, except after the presence of a large number of managers and players, as the name was approved after holding a general gathering, the result was the suggestion and choice of the name "Wydad Athletic Club", as a name for the club without the inclusion of the word "Casablanca" because the club represents all Moroccans, not just the residents of the city of Casablanca.

Wydad played its first game against defending champion USM Casablanca as part of the first day of the championship in what is a criterion of war in September 1939. This meeting was the first of Wydad ended in defeat with a score of two goals to one. The first scorer was Abdelkader Lakhmiri. During this first season Wydad it was not a championship that was played but a true test of war called cutting war because of the Second World War. The first edition of this competition was played so in the context of the 1939–40 season and ended with a victory for the USM Casablanca facing the new team what Wydad. One who had played his first match against USM and had also faced rematch is still faced in the final after an incredible journey that has to qualify. The meeting was ended with a score of 1–0 at Stade Philippe to Casablanca. In 1939–40, they were champions of Chaouia League, winners of the Moroccan Super Cup, and runners-up in the Moroccan Cup. The following season, Wydad was beaten by the Olympia Khouribga 1-0 in the quarter-finals.

==== Promotion and Honour Division (1941–1947) ====
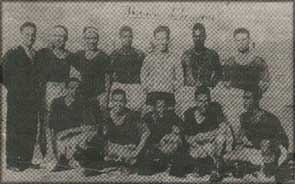
Wydad in 1942

Despite Morocco's engagement in World War II (which included combat theatre within country) the local authorities (under the orders of the Vichy regime) continue to host and hold local championships. Wydad competed in these war-time competitions during the early years of the war during which time many Moroccan soldiers traveled to France to defend France from foreign aggression.

After playing two seasons under war-time conditions, the French authorities under the orders of the Vichy regime decided to expand the competition and divide teams into two divisions and impose a European-style relegation/promotion system. Wydad, a fledgling club composed of uncelebrated locals, was initially relegated to the second division and not the first. Despite admirably competing against established clubs, placement in the second division was ratified by a federation dominated by clubs already competing in the first division. Despite these injustices, Wydad managed to be the first in their pool and eligible for promotion to the first division after a 1-nil victory between the dam at Ittihad Ribati. In an attempt to impede promotion, the federation decided to force the club to play another game. The federation selected the Athletic Union of Meknes. This encounter was played behind closed doors in Meknes and during the month of Ramadan. The opposing team for this competition was composed not of local Muslims, but of non-Muslim foreigners. The reasoning for scheduling such additional match with a non-Muslim club during Ramadan remains unconfirmed, but inherently suspicious. After successfully defeating opponents both on and off the pitch, the club's promotion to the top flight was confirmed by the federation. The defining moment during this time was a 12th minute goal by Ben Messaoud as the visiting club defeated the Meknes. 1941–42: Champion of Moroccan Championship D2

The next season after winning the championship promotion honor is the 2nd level football league in Morocco, and after winning his matches dams, Wydad newly promoted division plays of honor is 'equivalent of first division football league in Morocco. During this season, Wydad had a good run, finishing in the top three of their group to play the final round, which begins from the second round. And after a very good run, Wydad reached the final of the competition and confronts the USM Casablanca club already encountered in regional play. Wydad fails to win its first title in this competition and was beaten by the score of 2–0. 1942–43: Champion of Chaouia League, Runner-up of Moroccan Championship.

During the season 1943–44, the red and white ends the year with a balance of the quarter-finals after several victories, the club face Fedala score on the river 2–0. Also noteworthy during this season package of USM Casablanca.

In 1944–45, the club managed the final qualification in the pool but was eliminated by the Association Sportive Marrakech Marrakech often called SAM despite a victory in the second round against the ASM score of 3–0.

The 1945–46 season is one of the best in the club since its inception as Wydad won the regional championship with a total of more than 62 points or 19 wins, 2 losses, and 1 draw. After winning the title, Wydad qualifies for the final round where he was defeated by the USM Casablanca final score of 3–1. Despite this defeat, the balance of the season is rather positive.

During the 1946–47 season, the club honors its first participation in the North African Cup but failed to move beyond the sixteenth-finals following a defeat by club Fedala the most minimal scores a 1–0. In the league, the WAC failed to win the title

==== Early titles and independence (1947–1956) ====
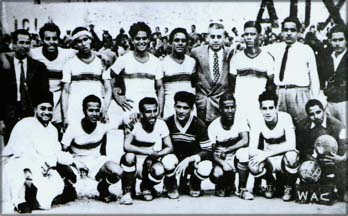
Wydad team in 1947

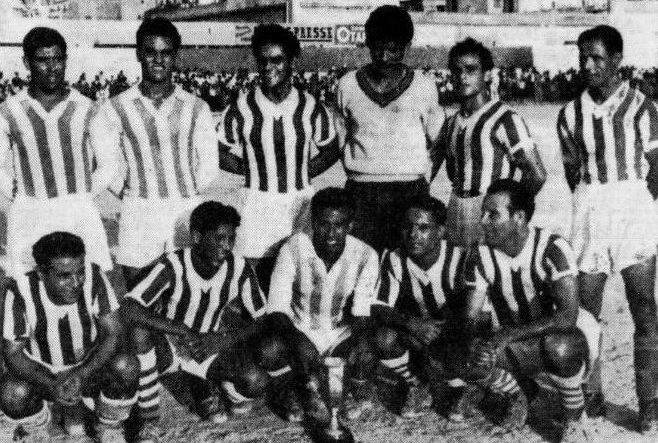
Wydad AC in 1952

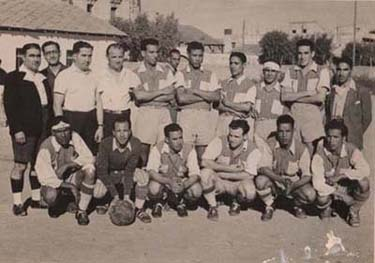
Wydad AC in 1955

It took over nine years for Wydad to finally win its first championship. In a group of 10 clubs, Wydad played 18 matches, won 6, lost 2 and drew 2. During the same season Wydad participated in the North African Championship, winning the title by beating the US Athletic's score of 4–2.

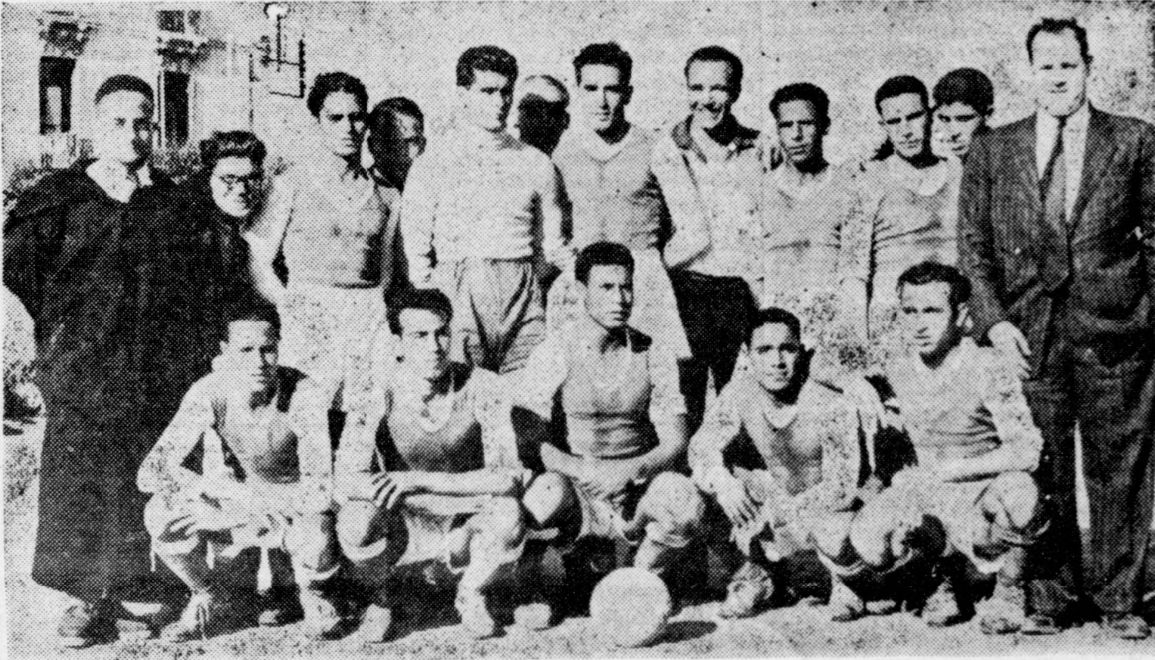
Wydad AC, champions of Morocco in 1948

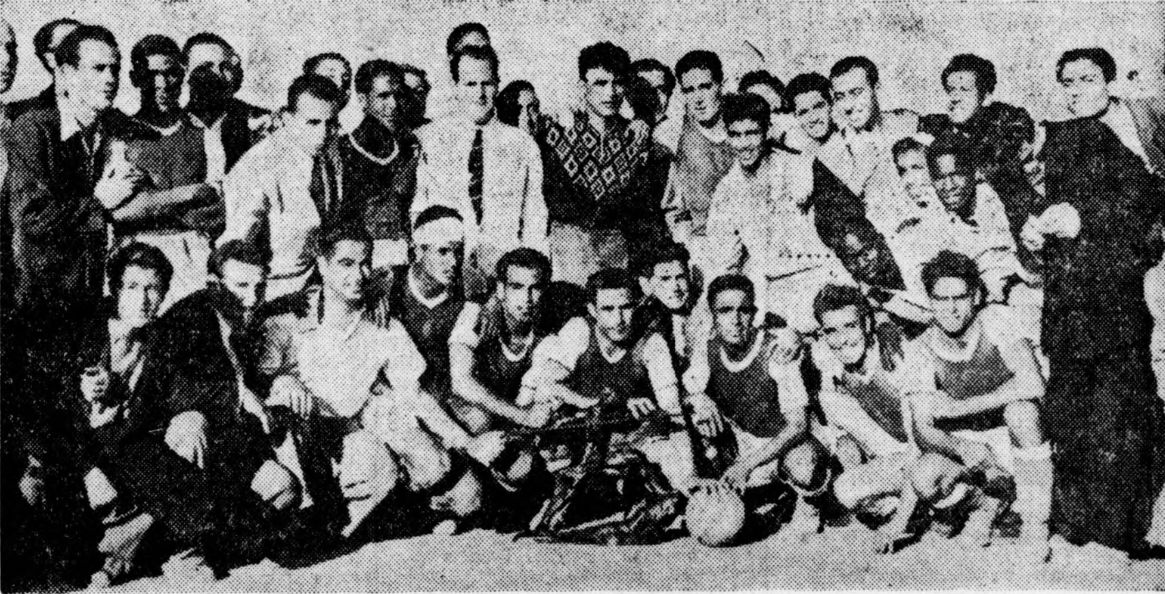
Wydad team celebrating the North African Championship in 1948

Wydad also took part in the 1948–49 season of the North African Cup, which is a competition organized by the Union of North African Leagues that it is made up of five leagues is that of the Morocco, Tunisia, Algiers, Oran and Constantine. The competition began for Wydad in the knockout final against Red Star of Algiers. The match ended in a victory for Wydad AC score of 3–1. Then, in the quarter-finals, he must face the USM Bone or he managed to climb in the semi-finals with a victory on the score of 2–1. Continuing his journey, he must then face the Olympic Hussein Dey, club league Algiers. This meeting was a massacre ending with a victory on the score of 3–0 while the club qualified for the finals is a club and even Casablanca Moroccan who managed to beat the Sports Club Hammam Lif on the modest score of 1–0. this club is in fact the US Athletic. The final was held in Casablanca in 1949, is opposed both clubs are Wydad AC that and the US Athletic and after 90 minutes of play, Wydad won the competition for the first time in its history with a victory on the score of 2–1. During the same season they also managed to win a Championship North African football when editing played as mini-league since it was the team with the most points wins the championship, they also won another championship, so it is the first club which has tripled something which nobody has done throughout history.

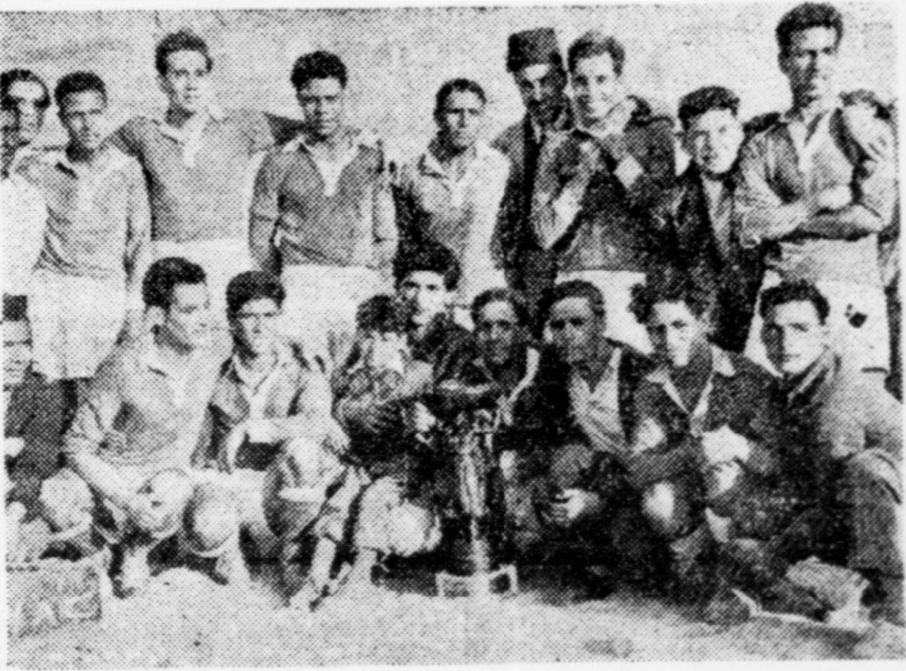
Wydad team, winners of the North African Cup in 1949

During the following season Wydad fails to succeed on a hat-trick but doubled. It won the Moroccan championship for the third time in its history and a row with a total of more than 57 points, and won the North African Championship by beating the USM Oran on the score 4–0 in Algiers on 28 May 1950.

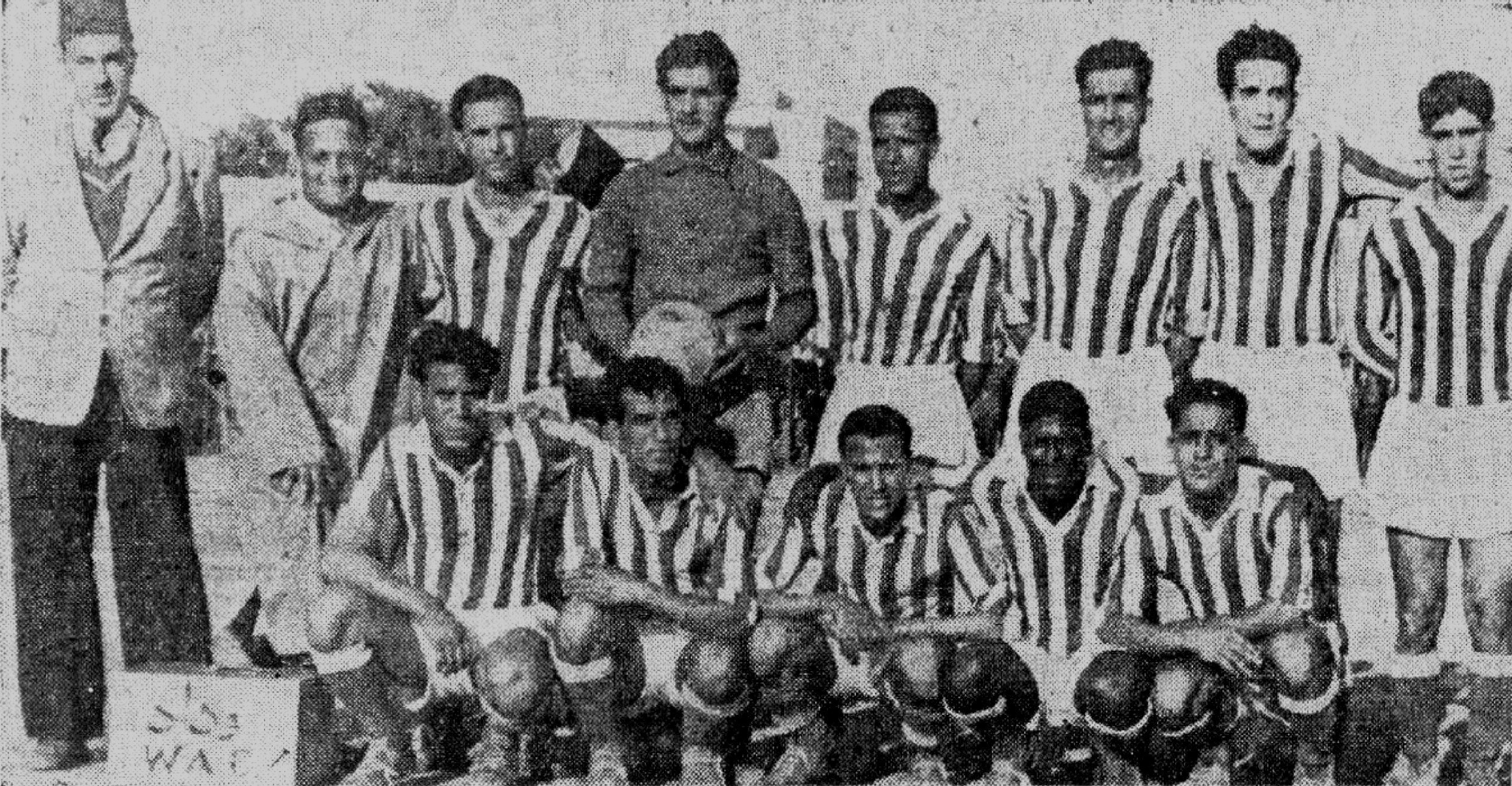
Wydad team, Champions of Morocco and North Africa Cup in 1950. From left to right, standing: Père Jégo, Mohamed Benjelloun, M'himdat, Si Mohamed, Hassan, Gandaoui, Kacem, Haffari; crouched: Abdesselem, Driss, Hajjami, Z'haar, Chtouki.

During the 1950–51 season, Wydad continues its momentum by winning the national championship for the fourth time in-a-row but was beaten in the final of the North African Cup face SC Bel Abbès on the score 1–0.

During the last season played before independence, Wydad won his fifth and last championship title before Moroccan independence. Participating teams in this championship was twelve in number counting Wydad. During the same season, the Reds were beaten in the final of the championship of North Africa to Casablanca in the face of ES Guelma score of 2–1.

=== After independence (1956–1960) ===
Morocco becomes independent, and the WAC receives the honorary Resistance Card with the number 1 by his royal majesty Mohammed V. Before launching the first Moroccan championship for the 1956/57 season, the committee decides to organize a first competition called Independence Cup, and classify the teams in the divisions. This cup is won by Wydad AC which has become the number 1 club in Morocco. The 38th edition of the championship (the first after independence) is won by the WAC (title holder) with the Kawkab of Marrakech as its runner-up. The same season in the cup, Wydad qualified for the final against MC Oujda. The match ends with a score of 1–1, King Mohammed V, Crown Prince Hassan II and WAC founder Mohamed Benjelloun Touimi who are present in this final, decide to give the cup to Mouloudia Oujda. because he scored the first goal.

During the following season, the WAC finished vice-champion of Morocco with 69 points, one less than the champion, the Kawkab Marrakech. The Wydad who was first loses all his points won against the USM Casablanca following the general forfeit of it and also loses in the final of the Morocco Cup against the same opponent of last season on the score of 2 goals to 1.

During the following season, Wydad is still vice-champion behind the Casablanca star while in the Throne Cup, the WAC is eliminated in the round of 16 against the FAR Rabat, winners of this competition. WAC forward Mohamed Khalfi finished top scorer in Botola with 21 goals.

The following season, Wydad reached fourth place with only one point less than the top three. In the Cup, and after defeating Essaouira with a score of one goal to zero, the WAC was eliminated in the quarterfinals against Mouloudia d'Ouejda.

=== The 1960s ===
The first 1960/61 season ended badly with a 7th place in the league, in the cup the WAC was able to climb into the final by defeating the future champion of this season, the FAR of Rabat, on the score of two goals to one. But Wydad has always missed its finals since 1956 and faces last season's champion Kenitra Athletic Club. The Wydad was beaten with the score of a goal to zero on April 24, 1960, at the Stade d'honneur in Casablanca.

The following season, the WAC finished 6th in the Botola classification, and was beaten in the eighth finals of the Morocco Cup against Mouloudia d'Ouejda with the score of 2 goals to 0.

In the 1962/63 season, the WAC again finished 6th in Botola, and reached the semi-final of the Morocco Cup eliminated by KAC Marrakech.

The following season, WAC was again 6th in Botola, and was a finalist in the Morocco Cup against KAC Marrakech.

In the 1964/65 season, the WAC finished in the championship in 5th place, and was eliminated in the quarter-finals of the Cup.

It was not until the 1965/66 season to see the WAC champion of Morocco for the 7th time, with a total of 57 points. As the team was eliminated in the eighth finals of the Morocco Cup against MAS Fez, it took fifteen years to return to the Moroccan Super Cup against COD Meknès (winner of the Cup). The WAC participated for the first time in its history in the Mohammed V Cup where it finished 4th, after elimination against Real Madrid in the semi-final with the score of 2 goals to 0.

The 1966–67 season ended with a 4th place in the championship, and an elimination in the quarter-final of the Morocco Cup against ASFAR.

The following season the WAC will finish 8th in Botola, and eliminated in the round of 16 of the Cup against the same opponent, the sports association of the royal armed forces.

During the 1968–69 season, the WAC returned to the Botola podium, winning its 8th title of Champion of Morocco with a total of 73 points, including 16 victories, 11 draws and 3 lost matches. But unfortunately, he was eliminated in the second round of the Cup.

=== Finally the Morocco Cup (1970–1979) ===
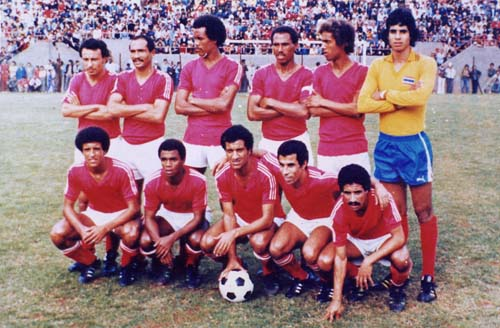
Wydad team in 1979. From left to right, standing: Kamal, Abdelhak, Keïta, Aherdane (captain), Safari, Zaki; crouched: Bouderbala, Chicha, Petchou, Moujahid, Abdelkhalek.

In 1970, Wydad AC (WAC) achieved its first Morocco Throne Cup triumph following a 1–0 victory over RS Settat, 31 years after the club's establishment. This initiated WAC's spectacular success story in the years to come throughout the 1970s. This decade saw WAC take home three Botola league titles, three Morocco Cups, and the Mohammed V Cup. This was a remarkable period for the club that had players like Larbi Aherdane, Ezzaki Badou, Aziz Bouderbala, Petchou, and Abdelmajid Shaita in their squad.

- In the 1969–70 season, Wydad finished 5th at Botola, winner of the Cup.
- 1970–71: 7th at Botola, 2nd round of the Cup.
- 1971–72: vice-champion of Botola, 1/8 final of the Cup.
- 1972–73: 9th at Botola, 2nd round of the Cup.
- 1973–74: 5th in Botola, 1/4 final of the cup.
- 1974–75: 9th at Botola, 2nd round of the Cup, winner of the Green Market Cup.
- 1975–76: Moroccan champion, 9th coronation, 1/8 Cup final.
- 1976–77: Champion of Morocco, 10th coronation, 1/8 final of the Cup, 3rd of the Mohammed V Cup.
- 1977–78: Champion of Morocco, 11th coronation, winner of the 2nd coronation Cup.
- 1978–79: 3rd at Botola, Cup winner, 3rd coronation, Mohammed V Cup winner.

=== The revival (1980–1989) ===
In the first season, the WAC finished runner-up in Morocco with only 1 point difference from the winner, and won the Cup for the second time in its history, and regained the Botola podium for the 12th time in 1986, and participates for the first time in the CAF Champions League, since it is the first Moroccan club to win the Arab Cup of Champions Clubs in 1989 and a 3rd Cup of Morocco in the same year.

- In the 1979–80: vice-champion of Morocco, 1/8 Cup final, winner of the Meknes International Tournament.
- 1980–81: 4th at Botola, Winner of the 4th coronation Cup, winner of the Mohamed Benjelloun Trophy.
- 1981–82: vice-champion of Morocco, 1/8 final of the Cup.
- 1982–83: 3rd at Botola, 1/8 Cup final, winner of the Independence Tournament.
- 1983–84: 5th at Botola, 2nd round of the Cup.
- 1984–85: 4th at Botola, 1/8 Cup final.
- 1985–86: Moroccan champion 12th coronation, 2nd round of the Cup.
- 1986–87: 4th at Botola, 2nd round of the Cup, 2nd round of the Champions League.
- 1987–88: 4th at Botola, semi-finalist of the Cup, winner of the Pescara International Cup.
- 1988–89: 5th at Botola, winner of the 5th coronation Cup, winner of the Arab Cup of Champions Clubs.

=== Golden Era (1990–1999) ===
During this decade, the WAC won all possible competitions, with two consecutive victories in Botola, the CAF Champions League, the Arab Elite Cup, the 15th coronation of champion of Morocco, the Afro-Asian Super Cup, the 8th Cup of Morocco in its history.

- 1989–90: Moroccan champion, 13th coronation, 2nd round of the Cup.
- 1990–91: Moroccan champion, 14th coronation, 1/4 final of the Cup, semi-finalist of the CAF Champions League.
- 1991–92: 3rd at Botola, 1/8 final of the Cup, winner of the CAF Champions League, winner of the Arab Elite Cup.
- 1992–93: finalist of the CAF Supercup, champion of Morocco, 15th coronation, 1/4 Cup final, winner of the Afro-Asian Cup.
- 1993–94: vice-champion of Morocco, winner of the Cup, 6th coronation, 2nd round of the Champions League.
- 1994–95: 7th coronation, 5th at Botola, 1/8 Cup final.
- 1995–96: 3rd at Botola, 1/4 Cup final, winner of the Dallas International Cup.
- 1996–97: vice-champion of Morocco, winner of the Cup, 7th coronation.
- 1997–98: 3rd at Botola, Cup winner, 8th coronation, semi-finalist of the African Cup Winners' Cup.
- 1998–99: winner of the Moroccan Supercup, 8th coronation, 5th at Botola, 1/16 Cup final, CAF Cup finalist.

=== Decline (2000–2014) ===
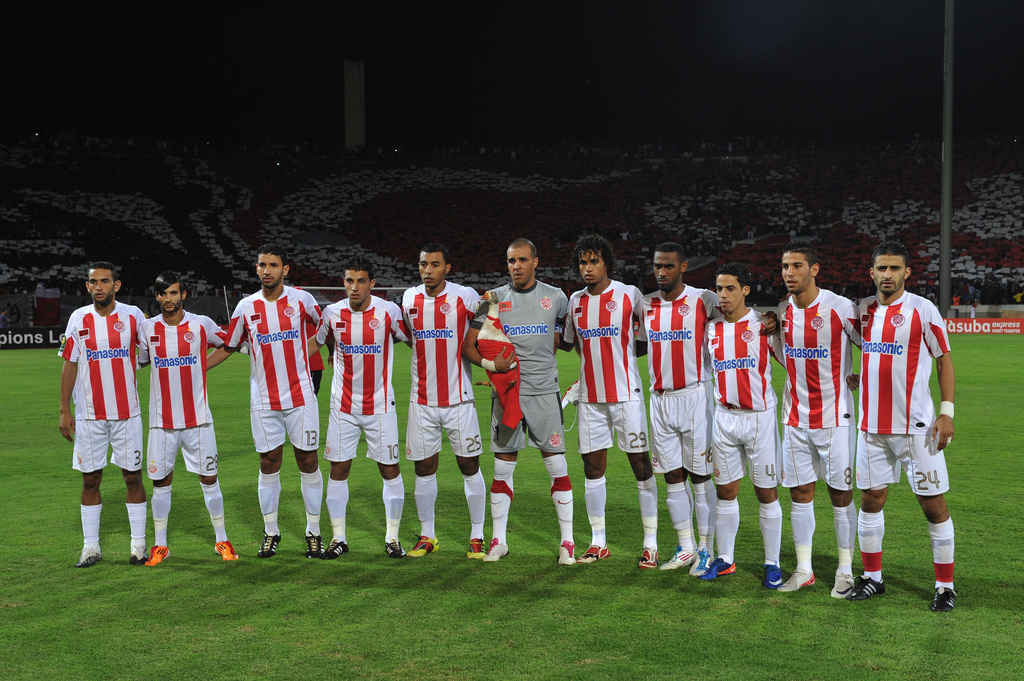
The Wydad team in 2011

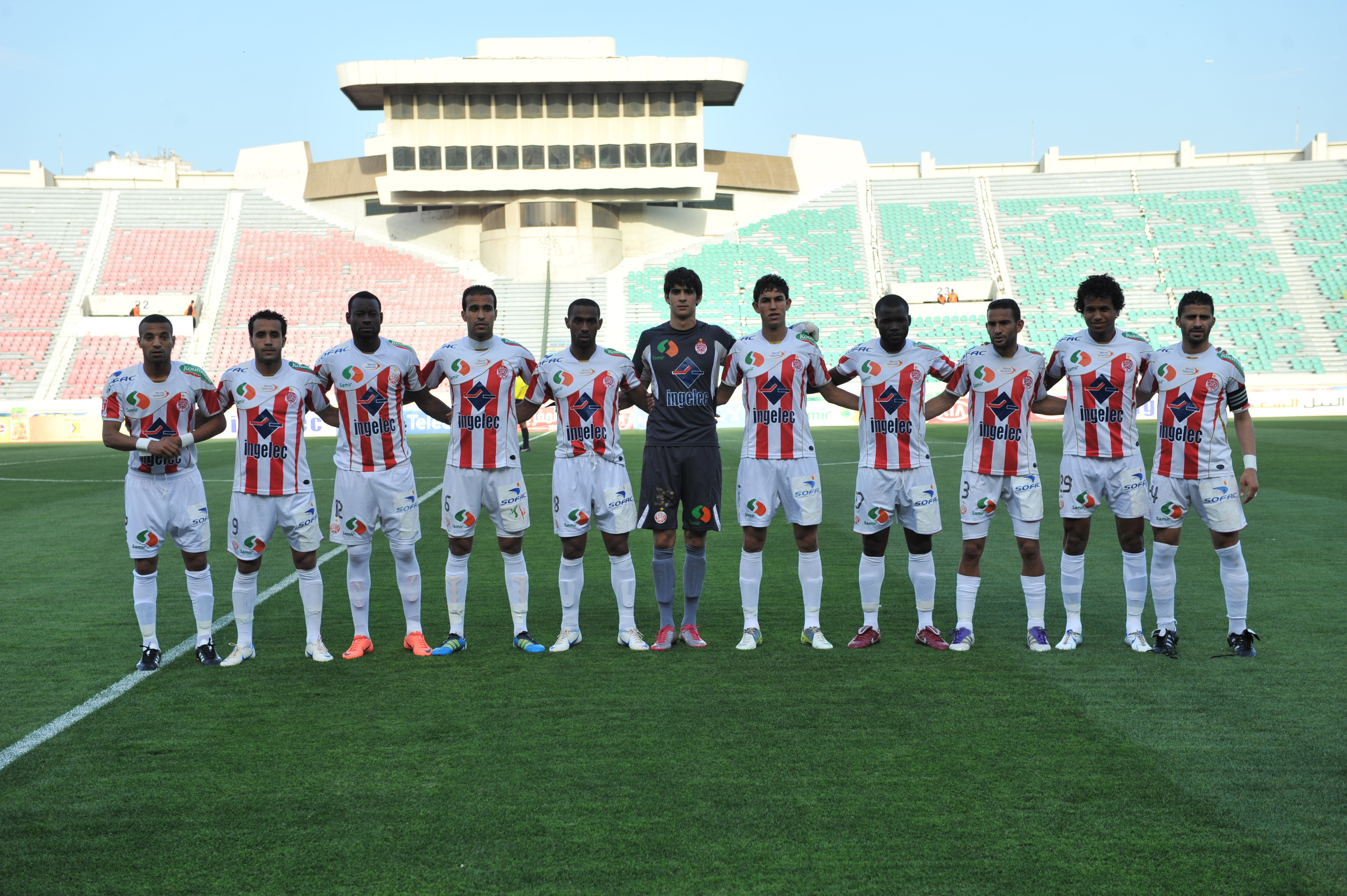
The Wydad team in 2012, with Yassine Bounou

During this decade, the Red Castle won fewer titles than ever before. It was a bad chapter in the history of the club.

- 1999–00: vice-champion of Morocco, 1/16 Cup final, 1/8 CAF Cup final.
- 2000–01: 7th at Botola, winner of the 9th coronation Cup, 1/4 final CAF Cup.
- 2001–02: vice-champion of Morocco, 1/16 final of the Cup, winner of the African Cup Winners' Cup after defeating Asante Kotoko S.C.
- 2002–03: Finalist of CAF Super Cup, 3rd at Botola, Cup finalist, semi-finalist of the African Cup Winners' Cup.
- 2003–04: 3rd at Botola, Cup finalist, intermediate round Confederation Cup.
- 2004–05: 3rd at Botola, 1/16 Cup final, 1/4 final of the Arab Cup.
- 2005–06: Moroccan champion 16th coronation, 1/8 final of the Cup, 1/4 final of the Arab Cup.
- 2006–07: 4th at Botola, semi-finalist of the Cup, 2nd round of the CAF Champions League.
- 2007–08: 7th at Botola, 1/8 Cup final, Arab Cup finalist after a 2–0 loss to ES Sétif.
- 2008–09: 4th at Botola, 1/4 Cup final, Arab Cup finalist after a 2–1 loss to Espérance Sportive de Tunis.
- 2009–10: Moroccan champion 17th coronation, 1/16 final of the Cup.

=== Said Naciri era (2014–2024) ===
==== Second CAF Champions League (2017) ====
Wydad starting 11 vs Al Ahly in the second leg of 2017 CAF Champions League Final

WAC won its 17th Botola title in 2010, followed by additional titles in 2015, 2017, 2019, 2021, and 2022. They also won the CAF Champions League in 2017, as well as the CAF Super Cup in he same year.

- 2014–15: Moroccan champion 18th coronation, 1/8 Cup final.

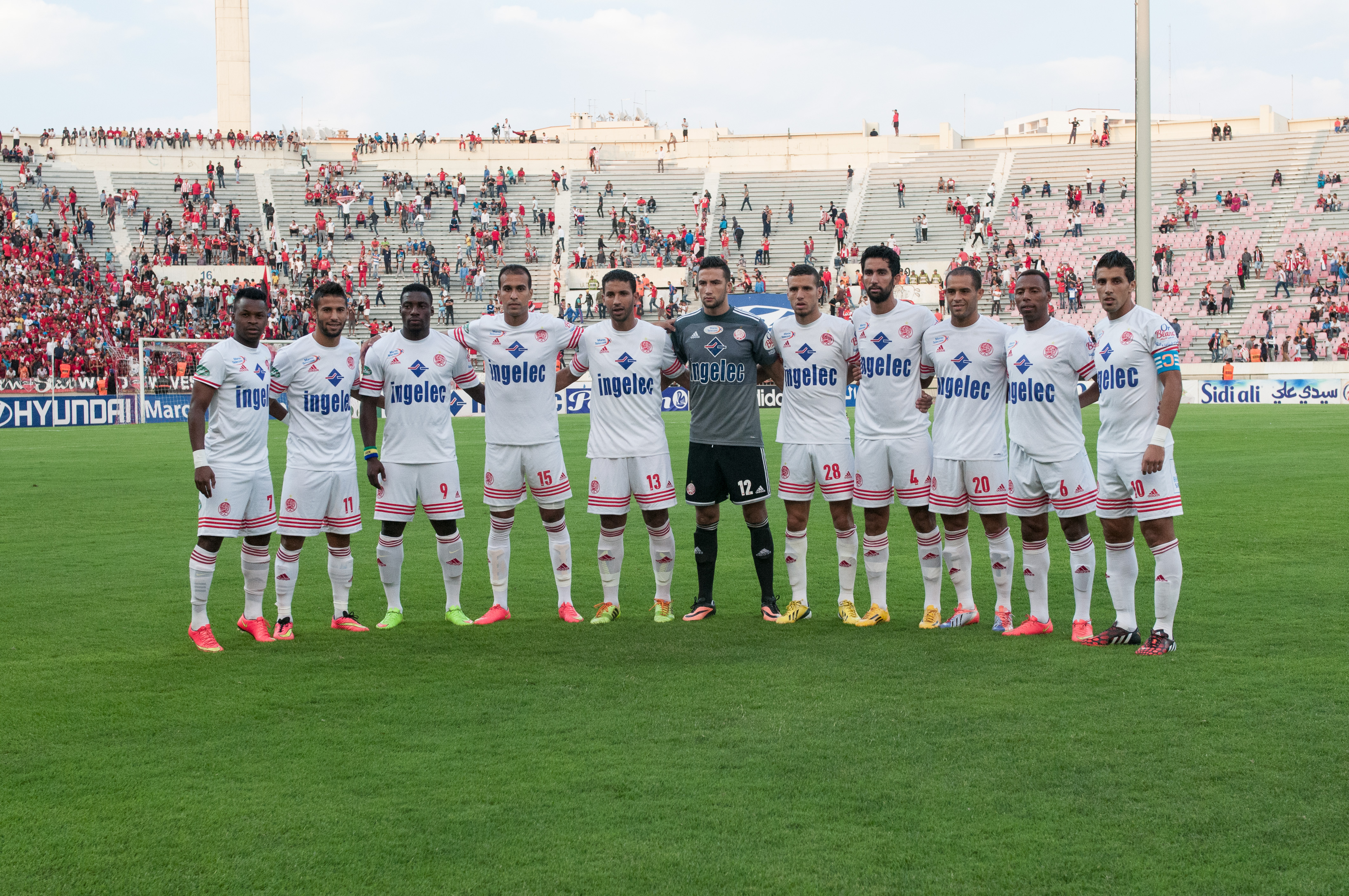
Wydad team, Champions of Morocco in 2015

- 2015–16: vice-champion of Morocco
- 2016–17: Moroccan champion 19th coronation, 1/8 final of the Cup, winner of the CAF Champions League.
- 2017–18: vice-champion of Morocco, semi-finalist of the Cup, 1/4 final of the CAF Champions League, 1/8 final of the Arab Cup, winner of the 2018 CAF Super Cup.

==== Second star and Radès final (2019) ====
- 2018–19: Moroccan champion 20th coronation, 1/16 of the Cup, finalist of the CAF Champions League after a devastating VAR scandal that gifted Espérance Sportive de Tunis the win.
- 2019–20: vice-champion of Morocco, Semi-finalist of the Cup, semi-finalist of the CAF Champions League.
- On 14 July 2021, Wydad defeated Mouloudia Oujda 0–2 at the Honneur Stadium to clinch their 21st league title, with three games left in the season, finalist of the Moroccan Throne Cup, semi-finalist of the CAF Champions League.

==== Third Champions League title and back-to-back league champions (2022) ====
One day after the club's 85th anniversary, Wydad defeated Atlético Petróleos de Luanda 4–2 on aggregate (3–1 away and 1–1 at home) to advance to their 5th Champions League final and the 3rd one in 6 years. On 30 May 2022, in a rematch of 2017 final, Wydad AC beat defending champions Al Ahly in the final to be crowned champions of Africa for the third time in its history, thanks to a brace from the Man of the Match, Zouhair El Moutaraji. During this campaign under Walid Regrgui role, the Red Castle has achieved many national records in the CAF Champions League: First Moroccan team to win an away semi-final match, most wins for a Moroccan team in a single season (9 wins), most goals scored in a single season (28 goals), and first Moroccan team to go undefeated for 9 straight games in a single season. With this win, Wydad will play in the first-ever all-Moroccan CAF Super Cup against 2021–22 CAF Confederation Cup winners, RS Berkane. On 21 July 2022, Wydad was elected as the Club of the Year in the 2022 CAF Awards.

==== The experience of the African Football League (2023) ====
In the 2022–23 CAF Champions League, Wydad qualified to the knockout stages after finishing top in the group stages winning four matches, drawing one and losing one. They faced Simba and won on penalties. They won Mamelodi Sundowns in the semi-final, qualifying them to their 6th champions league final.

In the inaugural season of the African Football League, WAC managed to qualify to the semi-final after defeating Enyimba 4–0 on aggregate (1–0 away and 3–0 at home). In the semi-finals, the moroccan emperor managed to qualify again after defeating Espérance Tunisia 2-1 on aggregate (1–0 home and 5-4 away). In the final, WAC lost in the Loftus Versfeld Stadium in Pretoria against Mamelodi Sundowns 2-3 on aggregate (2-1 home and 0-2 at away).

== Crest ==
Wydad AC crest history
1937–1947

1947–1983

1983–present

== Sponsorship ==
=== Official sponsor ===
| Period | Kit manufacturer | Shirt sponsor |
|---|---|---|
| 2025–present | (Italy) Kappa | Ingelec |

== Home stadium ==
Stade Mohammed V is the home stadium of both Wydad and Raja. It was called the Stade Marcel Cerdan from 1955 to 1956 and the Stade d'Honneur from 1956 to 1981. It was inaugurated on 6 March 1955 and renovated three times in 1981, 2000 and 2007. It is part of a large sports complex in the heart of Casablanca, specifically in the up-scale neighbourhood of Maârif.

It has a capacity of 67,000 spectators (reduced to more than 80,000 in 2000), not counting the North and South stands that have no seats. In 1997, 110,000 spectators showed up to the stadium in a match of the Moroccan national team against Ghana. In 2007, and also hosted afcon games, including Egypt VS Nigeria as a 3rd place playoff. the stadium was equipped with a semi-artificial turf which meets international standards.

== Supporters ==
Wydad is a team in Morocco with a fan-base. Wydad's ultras group is called "Ultras Winners", commonly referred to as "Ultras Winners 2005" in reference to the year of creation. With "Together forever" as their slogan, they are renowned for the love and support they have displayed for the team, as well as their displays at each game. With members all around the world, the Ultras Winners has a network of branches, called sections, in every continent with cells in each country, allowing the members to remain connected and engaged. All around Morocco, and wherever the team plays internationally, one can find tags with the mentions "UW05", "Win's 05", or "Winners05" as well as stickers from the group.

In 2015, Wydad Casablanca ranked the best "Tifo" in the world by French magazine La Grinta.

The "Winners 2005" were voted "World's best ultras" four times, in 2015, 2017, 2019, and 2022 by Ultras World magazine.

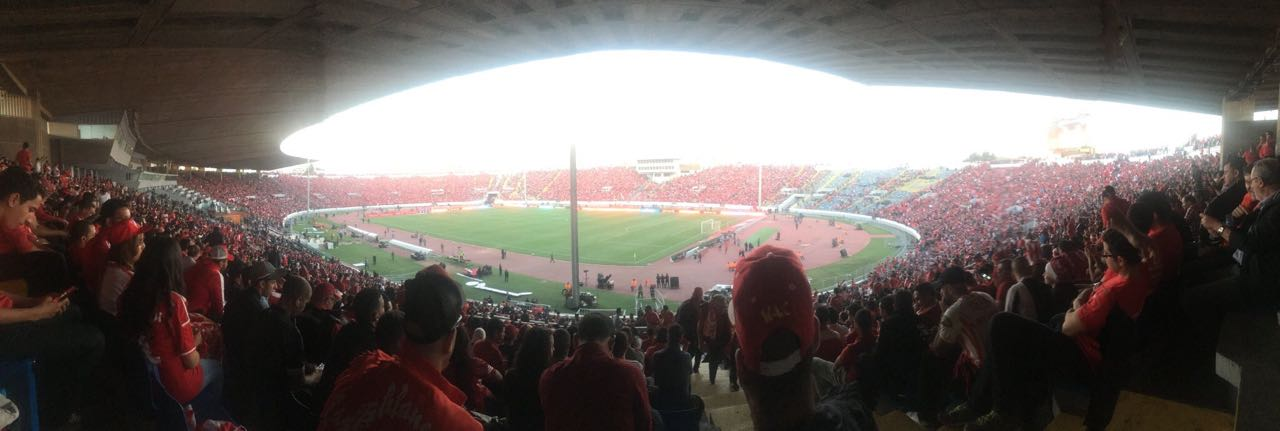
Supporters of Wydad AC in the Stade Mohammed V

| Type of group | Name | Creation date |
|---|---|---|
| Fans Association | Red & White | 2000 (Dissolved in 2007) |
| Fans Association | The Red House | 2002 |
| Ultras group | Winners (Supras) | 2004 (Dissolved in 2013) |
| Ultras group | Winners (Spirit) | 13 November 2005 |
| Fans Association | Contact | 2007 |
| Ultras group | Creators | January 21, 2008 (Dissolved in 2013) |
| Fans Association | Club of Nation's Fans | 2010 |

== Statistics and records ==
=== First match ===
- First match ever: (Moroccan's Juniors League) WAC (B) 3-1 US Marocaine (B) (15 october 1939)
- First Botola Pro1 match: (1939–40 Moroccan League) WAC 1–2 US Marocaine (15 october 1939)
- First title ever: (1939–40 Moroccan Super Cup) US Marocaine 2-3 WAC (29 september 1940)
- First International match: (North African Cup) RC Oued-Zem 0-2 WAC (26 october 1941)
- First International title: (North African Championship) WAC 4-2 US Athlétique (20 june 1948)
- First CAF-African match: (1987 African Cup of Champions Clubs) WAC 3–1 ASC Police
- First UAFA-Arab match: WAC 2–0 Al-Ittifaq (1989 Arab Club Champions Cup)

=== Biggest win ===
- Biggest First-league win: WAC 10–0 Fédala SC (1942/43 Botola Pro1)
- Biggest Throne Cup win: RCS El Jadida CA 0–6 WAC (2013–14 Throne Cup)
- Biggest Super Cup win: US Marocaine 3-5 WAC (1945-46 Moroccan Super Cup)
- Biggest Second-league win: WAC 6-0 RU Casablanca (1941/42 Botola Pro2)
- Biggest CAF-African win: WAC 6–0 Rivers UFC (2022–23 CAF Champions League)
- Biggest North African Championship win: WAC 5-0 USM Oran (1948-49 North African Championship )
- Biggest North African Cup win: WAC 7-0 Fédala SC (1952-53 North African Cup)
- Biggest Arab win: Wydad AC 4–0 Al-Wehdat (2008–09 Arab Champions League)

=== Statistics in Botola ===
- Record number of games won in one season: 23 games (1985–86)
- Record number of points in one season: 93 points (1985–86)
- Record goals scored in season: 58 goals (1985–86)
- Record for lowest number of goals conceded: 8 goals (2002–03)
- Record of consecutive games won: 9 games (1990–91)
- Record number of most away wins in one season: 14 games (1985–86)
- Record for lowest number of draws: 5 games (1986–87)

=== Sports records ===
- Record for most titles in Morocco: 69
- Record for national titles in Morocco: 38
- Record for international titles in Morocco: 13
- Record for the titles in the Moroccan League: 22
- Record for the titles in the Moroccan Super Cup: 7
- Record for the titles in the Moroccan Elite Cup: 4
- The only Moroccan team to win the Independence Cup: 1
- Record for the runner-up number in the Moroccan League: 17
- Record for the titles in the Moroccan Season's Opening Cup: 4
- Only to have never left the Moroccan League Elite Division since 1942
- Record for the number of consecutive seasons in the Moroccan League: 88
- The first and only African team to win the Mohammed V Cup: 1979
- The first Moroccan team to win the Afro-Asian Club Championship: 1993
- The first team to win the Domestic Double (Botola, Throne Cup): 1978
- The first Moroccan team to win the Arab Club Champions Cup: 1989
- National record number of North African Championship finals: 4
- The only Moroccan team to win the African Cup Winners' Cup: 2002
- National record number of CAF Champions league finals: 6
- National record number of CAF Champions league titles: 3
- The only Moroccan team to win the Arab Super Cup: 1990
- National record number of CAF Competitions finals: 13
- The first ever team to win the Arab Super Cup: 1990

=== Individual sports records ===
- Largest number of top scorers in the Championship, 17 times with 13 scorers:

Chtouki (1948, 1955) Abdesslam (1949), Driss (1950), Khalfi (1951, 1959), Chrif (1978), Mjidou (1984), Nader (1986, 1987, 1989), Fertout (1993), Evouna (2015), Jebor (2017), El Kaabi (2021), Mbenza (2022), Sambou (2023)

- Aziz Bouderbala is the player who win the most titles in the Throne Cup: 4 titles
- Moussa Ndao is the first foreigner to score in a Throne Cup final: 1989
- Abdelkhalek Saber is the first and only player to score three goals in a Throne Cup final: 1978
- Abdelkhalek Saber is the player who scored the most goals in the Throne Cup finals: 4 goals
- Hassan Nader is among the 4 players who achieved the highest number of championship's top scorer: 3 times
- Badou Zaki is the only goalkeeper who won the African Ballon d'Or: 1986

== Recent seasons ==
Last five seasons of Wydad Athletic Club
| Season | League | | | | | | | | | | Moroccan Throne Cup | Continental | | Other competitions | | Top scorer(s) (Note: Only league goals are counted.) | |
| Season | Division | Pld | W | D | L | GF | GA | GD | Pts | Pos | Moroccan Throne Cup | Continental | | Other competitions | | Player(s) | Goals |
|---|---|---|---|---|---|---|---|---|---|---|---|---|---|---|---|---|---|
| 2020–21 | Botola | 30 | 20 | 7 | 3 | 58 | 26 | +32 | 67 | 1st | SF | CAF Champions League | SF | — | | Ayoub El Kaabi | 18 |
| 2021–22 | Botola | 30 | 19 | 6 | 5 | 46 | 24 | +22 | 63 | 1st | RU | CAF Champions League | W | — | | (Republic of the Congo) Guy Mbenza | 16 |
| 2022–23 | Botola | 30 | 19 | 9 | 2 | 47 | 21 | +26 | 66 | 2nd | SF | CAF Super Cup | RU | FIFA Club World Cup | R2 | (Senegal) Bouly Sambou | 13 |
| 2022–23 | Botola | 30 | 19 | 9 | 2 | 47 | 21 | +26 | 66 | 2nd | SF | CAF Champions League | RU | FIFA Club World Cup | R2 | (Senegal) Bouly Sambou | 13 |
| 2023–24 | Botola | 30 | 12 | 8 | 10 | 31 | 27 | +4 | 44 | 6th | R32 | African Football League | RU | Arab Club Champions Cup | GS | (Nigeria) Ade Oguns | 6 |
| 2023–24 | Botola | 30 | 12 | 8 | 10 | 31 | 27 | +4 | 44 | 6th | R32 | CAF Champions League | GS | Arab Club Champions Cup | GS | (Nigeria) Ade Oguns | 6 |
| 2024–25 | Botola | 30 | 14 | 12 | 4 | 45 | 27 | +18 | 54 | 3rd | R16 | — | — | FIFA Club World Cup | GS | Mohamed Rayhi | 11 |

== Honours ==
Wydad Athletic Club honours
| Type | Competition | Titles | Winning seasons | Runners-up |
|---|---|---|---|---|
| National | Botola Pro | 22 | 1947–48, 1948–49, 1949–50, 1950–51, 1954–55, 1956–57, 1965–66, 1968–69, 1975–76, 1976–77, 1977–78, 1985–86, 1989–90, 1990–91, 1992–93, 2005–06, 2009–10, 2014–15, 2016–17, 2018–19, 2020–21, 2021–22 | 1939–40, 1942–43, 1945–46, 1951–52, 1957–58, 1958–59, 1971–72, 1979–80, 1981–82, 93–1994, 1996–97, 1999–00, 2001–02, 2015–16, 2017–18, 2019–20, 2022–23 |
| National | Moroccan Throne Cup | 9 | 1970, 1978, 1979, 1981, 1989, 1994, 1997, 1998, 2001 | 1957, 1958, 1961, 1964, 2003, 2004, 2021 |
| National | Super Cup | 7 | 1940, 1946, 1948, 1949, 1950, 1951, 1952 | 1943, 1955, 1957 |
| National | Moroccan Elite Cup | 4 | 1945, 1948, 1951, 1955 | 1949, 1956 |
| Continental | CAF Champions League | 3 | 1991–92, 2016–17, 2021–22 | 2010–11, 2018–19, 2022–23 |
| Continental | African Cup Winners' Cup | 1 | 2002 | – |
| Continental | CAF Super Cup | 1 | 2017 | 1993, 2003, 2022 |
| Continental | Afro-Asian Club Championship | 1 | 1993 | – |
| Regional | Arab Club Champions Cup | 1 | 1989 | 2008, 2009 |
| Regional | Arab Elite Cup | 1 | 1992 | – |
| Regional | Mohammed V Cup | 1 | 1978 | – |
| Regional | North African Championship | 3 | 1948, 1949, 1950 | 1955 |
| Regional | North African Cup | 1 | 1949 | 1951, 1953 |
| Regional | ULNA Friendship Cup | 3 | 1948, 1949, 1950 | – |

- record
- ^{S} shared record

=== Awards ===
- African Team of the Year: 2017, 2022
- Moroccan Team of the Year: 2017, 2019, 2021, 2022
- Globe Soccer The Best Arab Club: 2017

== Performance in CAF competitions ==
- CAF Champions League: 16 appearances
  1987 – Second round
  1991 – Quarter-finals
  1992 – Champions
  1993 – Second round
  1994 – Second round
  2007 – Second round
  2011 – Runners-up
  2016 – Semi-finals
  2017 – Champions
  2018 – Quarter-finals
  2018–19 – Runners-up
  2019–20 – Semi-finals
  2020–21 – Semi-finals
  2021–22 – Champions
  2022–23 – Runners-up
  2023–24 – Group stage
- African Football League: 1 appearance
  2023 – Runners-up
- CAF Confederation Cup: 5 appearances
  2004 – Second round of 16
  2007 – Second round of 16
  2012 – Group stage
  2013 – Second round
  2026 – Quarter-finals
- CAF Super Cup: 4 appearances
  1993 – Runners-up
  2003 – Runners-up
  2018 – Champions
  2022 – Runners-up
- African Cup Winners' Cup: 3 appearances
  1998 – Semi-finals
  2002 – Champions
  2003 – Semi-finals
- CAF Cup: 3 appearances
  1999 – Runners-up
  2000 – Second round
  2001 – Quarter-finals

== Rivalries ==
=== Casablanca Derby ===
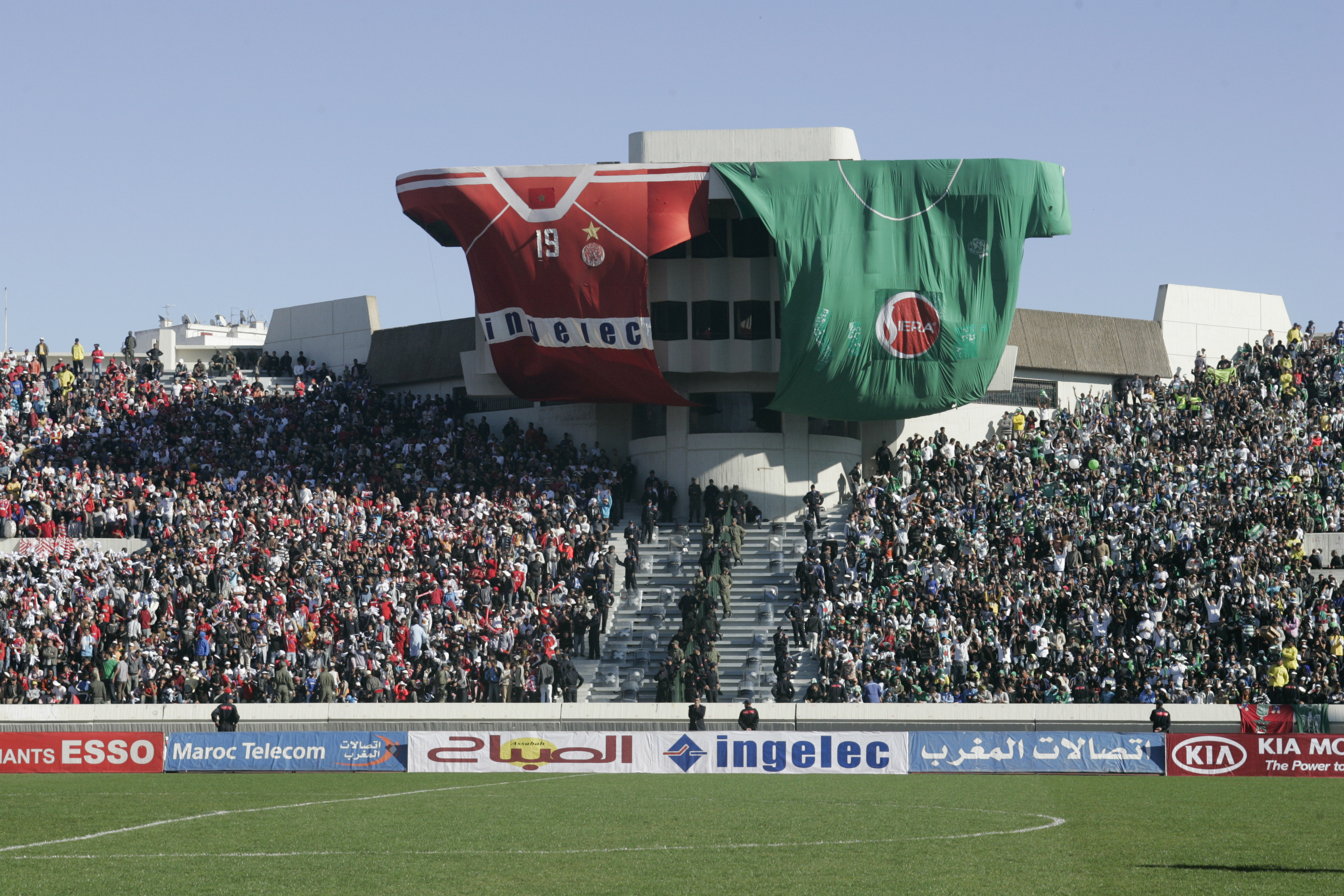
The giant shirts of Wydad AC and Raja CA in 2008

The Casablanca Derby is played between Wydad AC and its rival, the Moroccan football club Raja CA. Matches are played in the Stade Mohamed V, and are considered a major cultural event, typically garnering extensive media coverage. The first match between the two clubs occurred in 1956, in which Raja won 1–0.

== Players ==
=== Current squad ===
As of 24 October 2026

Note: Flags indicate national team as defined under FIFA eligibility rules; some limited exceptions apply. Players may hold more than one non-FIFA nationality.

| No. | Pos. | Nation | Player |
|---|---|---|---|
| 2 | DF | MAR | Mohamed Moufid |
| 3 | DF | MAR | Hamza Jananallah |
| 5 | MF | MAR | Yahya Jabrane |
| 6 | MF | MAR | Naïm Byar |
| 7 | FW | MAR | Haitam Hamani |
| 10 | MF | MAR | Ayman El Hassouni |
| 12 | GK | MAR | Abderrazak El Wadi |
| 13 | DF | MAR | Sallah Moussaddaq |
| 14 | DF | MAR | Yahya Attiyat Allah |
| 15 | FW | CGO | Silvère Ganvoula |
| 16 | GK | MAR | Mehdi Benabid |
| 17 | MF | MAR | Rayane Mahtou |
| 18 | MF | JOR | Nizar Al-Rashdan |

| No. | Pos. | Nation | Player |
|---|---|---|---|
| 19 | FW | MAR | Hamza Hannouri |
| 20 | FW | BOL | Moises Paniagua |
| 22 | FW | MAR | Mouad Enzo |
| 23 | MF | MAR | Oussama Zemraoui |
| 25 | DF | BFA | Issoufou Dayo |
| 27 | MF | COD | Joseph Bakasu |
| 28 | FW | MAR | Walid Nassi |
| 32 | DF | MAR | Salaheddine Cofi |
| 33 | MF | MAR | Adil Khalloufi |
| 40 | GK | MAR | Omar Aqzdaou |
| 91 | FW | MAR | Yassine Jabrane |
| — | GK | MAR | Rachid Ghanimi |
| — | FW | NED | Soufiane Hetli |

=== Reserves & Academy ===
Note: Flags indicate national team as defined under FIFA eligibility rules; some limited exceptions apply. Players may hold more than one non-FIFA nationality.

| No. | Pos. | Nation | Player |
|---|---|---|---|
| 37 | FW | MAR | Chamss Eddine El Allaly |
| 42 | DF | MAR | Brahim Laafouri |

| No. | Pos. | Nation | Player |
|---|---|---|---|
| 53 | FW | MAR | Salman Rihani |
| 55 | GK | MAR | Aymen El Jaafary |

=== Players under contract ===
Note: Flags indicate national team as defined under FIFA eligibility rules; some limited exceptions apply. Players may hold more than one non-FIFA nationality.

| No. | Pos. | Nation | Player |
|---|---|---|---|
| — | DF | MAR | Walid Atik |
| — | DF | MAR | Ayman Dairani |
| — | DF | BRA | Guilherme Ferreira |
| — | DF | MAR | Mohammed El Jadidi |

| No. | Pos. | Nation | Player |
|---|---|---|---|
| — | DF | MAR | Ayman El Wafi |
| — | MF | BRA | Pedrinho |
| — | FW | MAR | Zacarías Ghailán |
| — | FW | MAR | Ahmed Rhailouf |

=== Players on loan ===
Note: Flags indicate national team as defined under FIFA eligibility rules; some limited exceptions apply. Players may hold more than one non-FIFA nationality.

| No. | Pos. | Nation | Player |
|---|---|---|---|
| — | MF | TAN | Selemani Mwalimu (at Young Africans until 30 June 2027) |
| — | MF | BOL | Ramiro Vaca (at Khor Fakkan until 30 June 2027) |

== Personnel ==
=== Current technical staff ===
| Position | Name |
|---|---|
| Head coach | (Portugal) Paulo Sérgio |
| Assistant coaches | (Morocco) Youssef Achami (Morocco) Brahim Nekkach |
| Goalkeepers coach | (Morocco) Zouhair Laaroubi |
| Data analyst | (Morocco) Agdal Tarek |
| Tactical analyst | (Senegal) Elhadji Abdoulaye Seck |
| Set-piece coach | (Morocco) Fouad Taalat |
| Physical trainer | (Morocco) Idriss Saissi Hassani |
| Technical manager | (Morocco) Hassan Benabicha |

=== Management ===
| Position | Name |
|---|---|
| President | Hicham Ait Menna |

Last updated: 10 July 2025.

== Managers ==
- (Morocco) Père Jégo (1939–52)
- (Morocco) Mohamed Massoun (1952–53)
- (Morocco) Père Jégo (1953–56)
- (Morocco) Mohamed Massoun (1956–60)
- (Morocco) Abdelhaq Kadmiri (1961–63)
- (Morocco) Abderrahman Mahjoub (1965–68)
- (Morocco) Abdelhaq Kadmiri (1968–69)
- (Morocco) Mohamed Massoun (1969-70)
- (Hungary) István Balogh (1970–71)
- (Morocco) Mustapha Bettache (1972–74) (Note: Bettache had his first spell started from 1972; then at his second spell, he won three consecutive league titles: 1975–1976, 1976–1977 and 1977–1978.)
- (France) Lucien Leduc (1974–75)
- (Morocco) Mustapha Bettache (1975–81)
- (Brazil) Jorvan Vieira (1984)
- (Morocco) Mustapha Bettache (1984–85)
- (France) Jean Vincent (1985–86)
- (Netherlands) Cor van der Hart (1988–89)
- (Morocco) Abdellah Settati (1989)
- (Ukraine) Yuriy Sevastyanenko (1989–94)
- (Morocco) Zaki Badou (1995–96)
- (France) Marcel Husson (1996–97)
- (Romania) Alexandru Moldovan (1997–98)
- (Morocco) Zaki Badou (1998–2000)
- (Ukraine) Yuriy Sevastyanenko (1997, 1999, 2000–01)
- (France) Ladislas Lozano (1 January 2002 – 20 March 2002)
- (Argentina) Oscar Fulloné (2002–03)
- (Morocco) Rachid Taoussi (2003)
- (Serbia) Žarko Olarević (2003)
- (Serbia) Ivica Todorov (1 July 2003 – 30 November 2003)
- (Switzerland) Michel Decastel (1 December 2003 – 30 June 2004)
- (France) Jacky Bonnevay (1 July 2004 – 30 June 2005)
- (Portugal) José Romão (2005–06)
- (France) Ladislas Lozano (15 February 2007 – 30 April 2007)
- (Portugal) Nelo Vingada (2007)
- (Bulgaria) Plamen Markov (1 July 2007 – 2007)
- (France) Jean-Michel Cavalli (12 December 2007 – 10 February 2008)
- (Argentina) Oscar Fulloné (March 2008 – 8 June 2008)
- (Morocco) Zaki Badou (26 June 2008 – 23 April 2010)
- (Morocco) Fakhreddine Rajhi (May 2010)
- (Brazil) Dutra (2010)
- (France) Diego Garzitto (Oct 2010 – Jan 11)
- (Morocco) Fakhreddine Rajhi (2011)
- (Switzerland) Michel Decastel (20 June 2011 – 5 January 2012)
- (Spain) Benito Floro (1 January 2012 – 20 September 2012)
- (Morocco) Zaki Badou (7 October 2012 – 2 June 2013)
- (Morocco) Abderrahim Talib (18 June 2013 – 24 December 2013)
- (Wales) John Toshack (June 2014 – September 2016)
- (France) Sébastien Desabre (September 2016 – January 2017)
- (Morocco) Hussein Ammouta (January 2017 – January 2018)
- (Tunisia) Faouzi Benzarti (January 2018 – July 2019)
- (Serbia) Zoran Manojlovic (July 2019 – January 2020)
- (France) Sébastien Desabre (January 2020 – February 2020)
- (Spain) Juan Carlos Garrido (February 2020 – September 2020)
- (Argentina) Miguel Ángel Gamondi (September 2020 – November 2020)
- (Tunisia) Faouzi Benzarti (November 2020 – 31 August 2021)
- (Morocco) Walid Regragui (10 August 2021 – 28 July 2022)
- (Morocco) Hussein Ammouta (18 August 2022 – 30 November 2022)
- (Morocco) Hassan Benabicha (30 Novembre 2022 – 2 January 2023)
- (Tunisia) Mehdi Nafti (2 January 2023 - 26 February 2023)
- (Spain) Juan Carlos Garrido (26 February 2023 – 5 May 2023)
- (Belgium) Sven Vandenbroeck (5 May 2023 – 11 July 2023)
- (Morocco) Adil Ramzi (22 July 2023 – 15 December 2023)
- (Tunisia) Faouzi Benzarti (16 December 2023 – 15 February 2024)
- (Morocco) Aziz Ben Askar (5 April 2024 – 10 July 2024)
- (South Africa) Rhulani Mokwena (11 July 2024 – 29 April 2025)
- (Morocco) Mohamed Amine Benhachem (29 April 2025 – 23 March 2026)
- (France) Patrice Carteron (24 March 2026 – 30 April 2026)
- (Morocco) Mohammed Benchrifa 30 Avril 2026 – 22 juin 2026)
- (Morocco) Adil Hermach (25 juin 2025 – 6 juillet 2026)

== Presidents ==
- (Morocco) Mohamed Benjelloun (1937–42)
- (Morocco) Abdelkader Benjelloun (1942–44)
- (Morocco) Abdellatif Alami (1944–45)
- (Morocco) Mohamed Belahssan Benjelloun (1945–47)
- (Morocco) Abderrahmane Slaoui (1947–52)
- (Morocco) Abdelkader lahrizi (1952–54)
- (Morocco) Bensalem Smili (1954–55)
- (Morocco) Abderrahmane El-Khatib (1955–58)
- (Morocco) Azzedine Benjelloun (1958–62)
- (Morocco) Nacer Laraki (1962–63)
- (Morocco) Hassan El-Joundi (1963–67)
- (Morocco) Ahmed Lahrizi (1967–71)
- (Morocco) Abderrazak Lahlou (1971–72)
- (Morocco) Abderrazak Mekouar (1972–93)
- (Morocco) Boubker Jdahim (1993–97)
- (Morocco) Abdelmalik Sentissi (1997–99)
- (Morocco) Nasserdine Doublali (1999–03)
- (Morocco) Abdelilah El-Manjra (2003–05)
- (Morocco) Taïb El-Fechtali (2005–07)
- (Morocco) Abdelillah El-Akram (2007–2014)
- (Morocco) Saïd Naciri (2014–2024)
- (Morocco) Hicham Ait-Menna (2024–2026)

== Trivia ==
Ranking of the most titled players in the history of Wydad AC in official competitions (excluding current squad 2025)

| Rank | Player | Years | League | Cup | Africa (Note: The "Africa" column includes the African Cup of Champions Clubs / CAF Champions League, African Cup Winners' Cup, CAF Cup, and CAF Confederation Cup.) | Other (Note: The "Other" column includes the Afro-Asian Club Championship, Arab Club Champions Cup, Arab Elite Cup, North African Championship and the North African Cup.) | Total |
|---|---|---|---|---|---|---|---|
| 1 | (Morocco) Hassan Benabicha | 1985–1997 | 4 | 3 | 1 | 3 | 11 |
| 2 | (Morocco) Mustapha Achab | 1987–1999 | 3 | 4 | 1 | 3 | 11 |
| 3 | (Morocco) Rachid Daoudi | 1989–1994; 1996–1997; 2002–2003 | 3 | 3 | 2 | 3 | 11 |
| 4 | (Morocco) Mohamed Chtouki | 1945–1952; 1954–1958 | 6 | – | | 4 | 10 |
| 5 | (Morocco) Abderrahman Haffari | 1946–1958 | 6 | – | | 4 | 10 |
| 6 | (Morocco) Abdenbi Mestassi | 1947–1957 | 6 | – | | 4 | 10 |
| 7 | (Morocco) Fakhreddine Rajhi | 1981–1995 | 4 | 2 | 1 | 3 | 10 |
| 8 | (Morocco) Fadel Jilal | 1984–1996 | 4 | 2 | 1 | 3 | 10 |
