= 2000 Intercontinental Cup =

Real Madrid	Boca Juniors
(Spain)	(Argentina)
1	2
- Date: 28 November 2000
- Venue: National Stadium, Tokyo
- Man of the Match: Martín Palermo (Boca Juniors)
- Referee: Óscar Ruiz (Colombia)
- Attendance: 52,511

The 2000 Intercontinental Cup, officially the 2000 Toyota European / South American Cup for sponsorship reasons, was an association football match played on 28 November 2000 between Real Madrid, winners of the 1999–2000 UEFA Champions League, and Boca Juniors, winners of the 2000 Copa Libertadores. The match was played at the neutral venue of the National Stadium in Tokyo in front of 52,511 fans. Martín Palermo was named as man of the match.

It was the second official match between both clubs, having first met in the Copa Iberoamericana, a cup competition held only once and contested by the 1993 Copa de Oro and 1992–93 Copa del Rey winners, and won by Real Madrid 4–3 on aggregate.

Prior to those matches, they had met only in friendly games, the first time being in 1925 during the successful Boca Juniors tour to Europe, which ended with a 1–0 win for the visitor. Other later matches included a Boca Juniors win in the 1964 Mohammed V Cup final.

== Background ==
Real Madrid was going through its first "Galáctico" era, a period that had begun with the signing of forward Luis Figo. In addition to the Portuguese star, the squad featured other notable players such as Guti, Roberto Carlos, Raúl, Fernando Hierro, and Claude Makelele. Vicente Del Bosque was the manager (having taken duties in 1994), and in the eyes of the public, Real Madrid was the favorite to win the Intercontinental title.

On the other hand, Boca Juniors were leaders of the 2000 Apertura tournament (a title they would clinch on the final matchday against Estudiantes de La Plata), boasting an established squad and the notable leadership of Carlos Bianchi. Their star was Juan Román Riquelme, supported by players such as Jorge Bermúdez, Sebastián Battaglia, Mauricio Serna, Martín Palermo, and Marcelo Delgado.

The *Xeneize* squad arrived in Japan several days before the final and won over the local crowd by being readily available for autographs and photos—an approach that contrasted sharply with the insular attitude adopted by the Real Madrid delegation. This proved to be a key factor, as the crowd cheered almost exclusively for Boca during the match; the team had also brought a large contingent of supporters with them.

On the eve of the match, Bianchi weighed all the options and meticulously assembled the team to face Real Madrid. He made a decision then that would be painful but would also prove to be a key factor in the subsequent victory: he dropped Daniel Fagiani —who had been a starter throughout the lead-up— from the lineup and brought in Aníbal Matellán to take the mark on Figo

== Venue ==
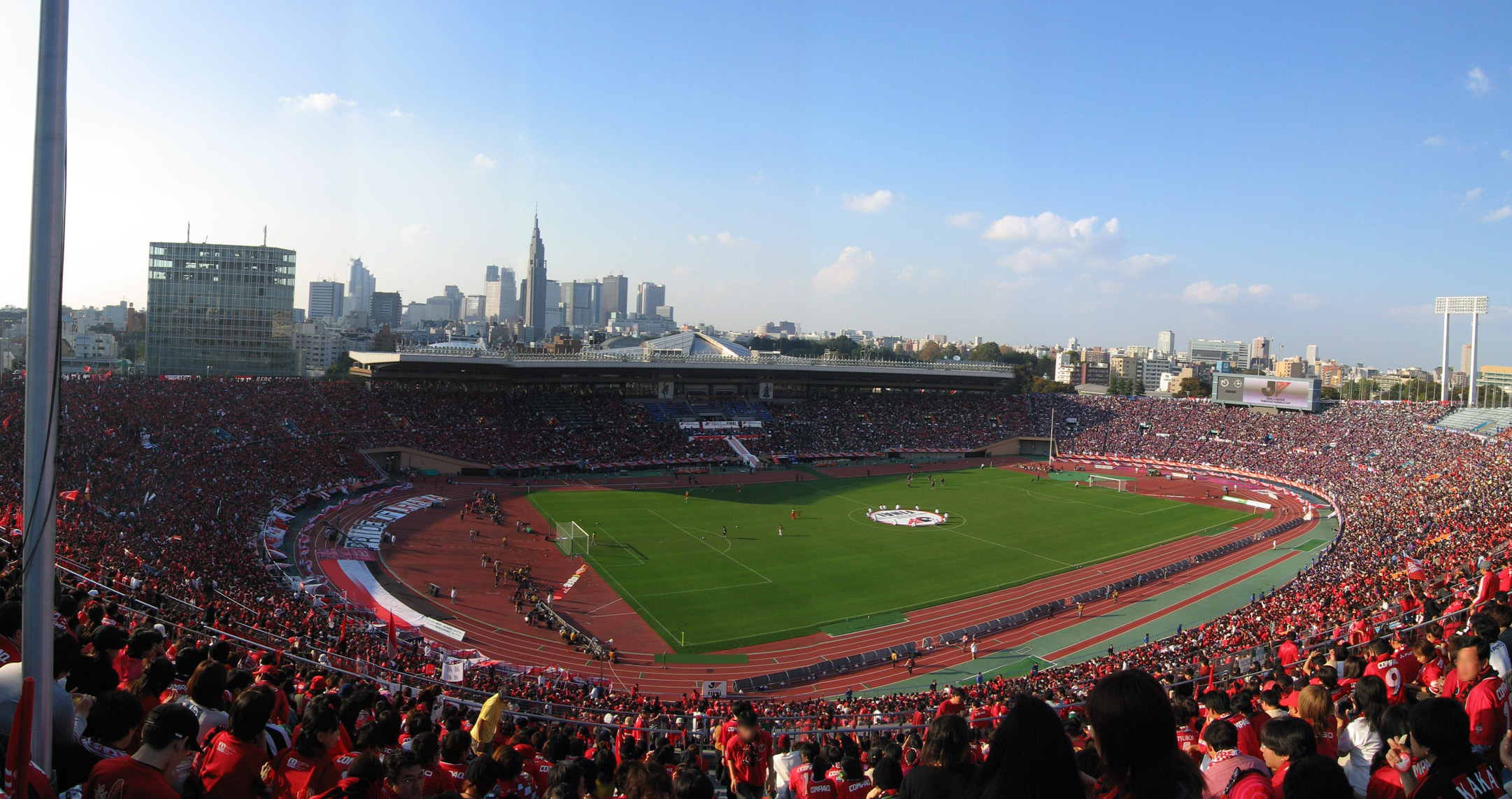
Olympic Stadium in Tokyo hosted the final

The match was held in the Olympic Stadium in Tokyo, Japan, which had also served as the main stadium for the opening and closing ceremonies, as well as being the venue for track and field events at the 1964 Summer Olympics.

With the change of format of the Intercontinental Cup from a two-legged tie competition to a single match in 1981, the stadium hosted all the cup editions since 1980 to 2001.

In 2015 the venue was demolished and the site was redeveloped with a new larger-capacity Olympic Stadium. The new stadium was the main venue for the 2020 Summer Olympics and Paralympics.

During its existence, the stadium also hosted matches of the Japan national football team, as part of major football club cup finals. The stadium's official capacity was 57,363, but the seating capacity was only 48,000 seats.

== Match ==
=== Summary ===
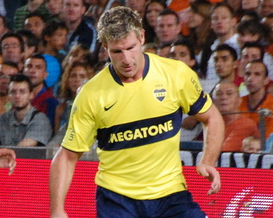
Forward Martín Palermo scored the two goals for Boca Juniors in the first 6 minutes of the match

Boca Juniors caught the Spanish team off guard, taking a 2–0 lead within just six minutes. First, a powerful run down the flank by Marcelo Delgado resulted in a cross to forward Martín Palermo, who finished from the six-yard box with a left-footed touch to make it 1–0 just three minutes into the match. Then, a precise assist from Juan Román Riquelme —delivered from near Boca's own box deep into the attacking third— put Palermo one-on-one with Iker Casillas; the goalkeeper failed to stop the number 9's left-footed shot, and the Cameroonian defender Geremi was unable to prevent the goal either. Thus, Boca went up 2–0 in Tokyo in the sixth minute.

The Brazilian Roberto Carlos added some suspense when he pulled a goal back for the Spaniards in the 12th minute with an outside-of-the-boot strike following a poor headed clearance by Hugo Ibarra. With the score at 2–1, Carlos Bianchi's team managed to withstand the attacks from Del Bosque's side. Moreover, Riquelme seemed to have the ball glued to his feet, making it impossible for Makelele —a 1998 World Cup winner with France— to dispossess him.

A partir de la ventaja, Boca controló el partido con cierta tranquilidad. Riquelme se hizo dueño de la pelota y en el recuerdo quedaron sus gambetas a Makelele y a Geremi. Sobre el final del primer tiempo, Palermo tuvo, de cabeza, la oportunidad de estirar la ventaja, pero la pelota se fue por encima del travesaño.

"Don't worry", Bianchi told Palermo, who was still lamenting his missed chances at halftime. "We won’t get the 3–1, but they won't equalize either". Bianchi's prediction came true, and Boca became world champions for the second time in their history (having previously won the title in 1978). A third intercontinental title would follow three years later, when they defeated Carlo Ancelotti’s Milan on penalties at the same venue.

=== Details ===
28 November 2000
19:10 JST

Real Madrid (Spain)	1–2	(Argentina) Boca Juniors
Roberto Carlos 12'	Report	Palermo 3', 6'

National Stadium, Tokyo
Attendance: 52,511
Referee: Óscar Ruiz (Colombia)

Real Madrid	Boca Juniors

GK	25	(Spain) Iker Casillas
RWB	15	(Cameroon) Geremi	(yellow card) 89'
CB	4	(Spain) Fernando Hierro
CB	6	(Spain) Iván Helguera	(yellow card) 89'
CB	18	(Spain) Aitor Karanka
LWB	3	(Brazil) Roberto Carlos
DM	24	(France) Claude Makélélé		(substituted off) 77'
RW	10	(Portugal) Luís Figo
AM	14	(Spain) Guti
LW	8	(England) Steve McManaman		(substituted off) 67'
CF	7	(Spain) Raúl (c)
Substitutes:
GK	13	(Spain) César Sánchez
DF	2	(Spain) Míchel Salgado
DF	12	(Spain) Iván Campo
MF	11	(Brazil) Sávio		(substituted on) 67'
MF	17	(Brazil) Flávio Conceição
MF	19	(Argentina) Santiago Solari
CF	9	(Spain) Fernando Morientes		(substituted on) 77'
Manager:
(Spain) Vicente del Bosque

GK	1	(Colombia) Óscar Córdoba
RB	4	(Argentina) Hugo Ibarra	(yellow card) 69'
CB	2	(Colombia) Jorge Bermúdez (c)
CB	13	(Argentina) Cristian Traverso
LB	6	(Argentina) Aníbal Matellán
CM	22	(Argentina) Sebastián Battaglia		(substituted off) 90+3'
CM	5	(Colombia) Mauricio Serna
CM	18	(Argentina) José Basualdo
AM	10	(Argentina) Juan Román Riquelme
CF	16	(Argentina) Marcelo Delgado		(substituted off) 88'
CF	9	(Argentina) Martín Palermo
Substitutes:
GK	12	(Argentina) Roberto Abbondanzieri
DF	14	(Argentina) Nicolás Burdisso		(substituted on) 90+3'
MF	8	(Argentina) Julio Marchant
MF	17	(Argentina) Gustavo Barros Schelotto
MF	24	(Peru) José Pereda
FW	7	(Argentina) Guillermo Barros Schelotto		(substituted on) 88'
FW	20	(Argentina) Antonio Barijho
Manager:
(Argentina) Carlos Bianchi

Man of the Match:
(Argentina) Martín Palermo (Boca Juniors)

Assistant referees:
Liu Tiejun (China PR)
Noboru Ishiyama (Japan)
Fourth official:
Naotsugu Fuse (Japan)

== Aftermath ==
The recognition of Boca Juniors as "world champions" on Argentine newspapers front cover titles

"Boca Campeón Mundial" on Clarín

"Campeones del mundo" on Olé

The Boca Juniors win over Real Madrid is widely regarded as a milestone in the history of the club

Martín Palermo's two goals earned him the right to be named man of the match. He had already been a key pillar of the Boca side that won back-to-back titles in 1998 and 1999, as well as the team that won the Copa Libertadores in 2000. Palermo recalled the match in a 2025 interview, saying: "I ran into [Iker] Casillas at the 2025 FIFA Club World Cup, and he told me: 'People really bust my balls about the two goals you scored against me every time the anniversary comes around". He added: "On top of that, he took a photo holding up two fingers, you wouldn't believe the messages he got...".

We had an insatiable hunger for glory. From the start of the 1998 tournament campaign through the 2000 Copa Libertadores and all the way to the final against Real Madrid, we were obsessed with winning, winning, winning, and winning. We thought of nothing but winning

— Martín Palermo in 2025

=== Revival attempt ===
After the success of the first FIFA Club World Championship held in Brazil in 2000, FIFA thought to organise a second "Club World Cup", hoping to replicate the 2000 Intercontinental Cup final between Boca and Real Madrid. Furthermore, participating in the tournament would generate significant revenue for Boca Juniors, helping to balance the books and settle part of the debt owed to the squad—an amount exceeding six million dollars.

The format was also quite appealing: Boca would be the top seed in Group A, rounded out by Lionel Scaloni's Deportivo La Coruña, Australia's Wollongong Wolves, and Egypt's Zamalek. Group B consisted of Brazil's Palmeiras, Honduras's Olimpia, Turkey's Galatasaray, and Saudi Arabia's Al-Hilal. Group C comprised Real Madrid, Japan's Júbilo Iwata, Ghana's Hearts of Oak, and United States' Los Angeles Galaxy. The winners of each group and the tournament's best runner-up would qualify directly for the semifinals.

Nevertheless a strong rumor began circulating in Europe that Real Madrid had no interest in competing in the tournament, as Vicente del Bosque intended to hold a rigorous pre-season training camp ahead of the new season —a claim that no one from the club denied. According to FIFA, the real reasons for the cancellation stemmed from a series of financial setbacks and scheduling issues.

"It's a shame, because Boca missed out on earning a significant sum of money that would have helped us balance the books and pay off the debt owed to the players", stated Roberto Digón, Boca Juniors vice president at the time. The arrears persisted, and the players —led by Mauricio Serna— celebrated qualifying for the 2001 Copa Libertadores final by wearing T-shirts bearing the slogan "Pay up and shut up" (dedicated to Orlando Salvestrini, the club's treasurer).

Frustrated by the cancellation of the Club World Cup —and attempting to smooth over tensions between the players and the board—Bianchi proposed reviving the old Interamerican Cup, pitting the Copa Libertadores champion (Boca) against the 2000 CONCACAF Champions Cup winner (LA Galaxy). The initial plan was to hold the matches between July and August 2001 —first in Buenos Aires and then in Los Angeles— but the clubs failed to reach an agreement. A backup plan involved playing the match in December en route to Japan, but that, too, fell through. Boca was left without the Interamerican Cup or the Club World Cup —a trophy they would not contest until 2007.

== See also ==
- 1999–2000 UEFA Champions League
- 2000 Copa Libertadores
- 2000 FIFA Club World Championship
- Real Madrid CF in international football competitions
