= Bettache =

Bettache is a surname. Notable people with the surname include:

- Faysal Bettache (born 2000), English professional footballer
- Mustapha Bettache (1931–2005), Moroccan professional footballer
