= Hassan Benabicha =

Moroccan footballer and manager

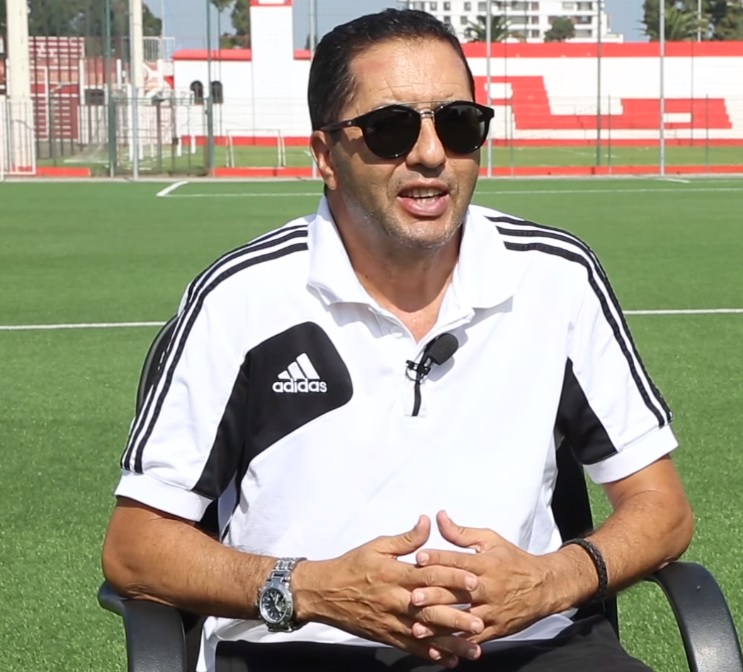

Personal information
- Full name: Hassan Benabicha
- Date of birth: 15 April 1964 (age 62)
- Place of birth: Khemisset, Morocco
- Position: Attacking midfielder

Senior career*
Years	Team	Apps	(Gls)
1985–1997	Wydad Casablanca		

International career
1988–1991	Morocco	3	(0)

Managerial career
- 2008: Kawkab Marrakech (caretaker)
- 2010–2011: Morocco U18
- 2011–2013: Morocco U20
- 2013–2014: Morocco
- 2014–2015: Morocco U-23
- 2016: Kawkab Marrakech
- 2019: Rapide Oued Zem
- 2020-2021: KAC Kénitra
- 2022: Wydad Casablanca
- * Club domestic league appearances and goals

Hassan Benabicha (Arabic: حسن بنعبيشة; born 15 April 1964) is a Moroccan football manager and former player.

== Biography ==
Benabicha played several years for Wydad Casablanca and is counted among the club's most emblematic players. Once his playing career completed, Benabicha managed numerous Moroccan teams, including FAR Rabat, Kawkab Marrakesh and JS Massira.

In 2008, Benabicha was appointed as caretaker manager for Kawkab Marrakech. In April 2010, he took charge of the Moroccan U18 national team. In 2011, Benabicha became the head coach of Morocco's U20 team, which he temporarily left to manage Morocco's local players in the 2014 African Nations Championship taking place in South Africa. The team left the competition in the quarter-finals following a 4–3 defeat to Nigeria.

After head coach Rachid Taoussi's dismissal, Benabicha became Morocco's interim manager. He led the team in a friendly match against Gabon in Marrakesh, which ended in a 1–1 draw. Benabicha left the position in 2014. He was eventually replaced by 1986 African Footballer of the Year and former Morocco player Badou Ezzaki, who most notably led the national team to the final of the 2004 African Cup of Nations.

== Honours ==
=== As manager ===
Morocco U20

- Mediterranean Games: 2013
- Islamic Solidarity Games: 2013
- Jeux de la Francophonie runner-up: 2013
- Toulon Tournament runner-up: 2015
