= Mohammed V Cup =

Intercontinental Mohammed-V Cup
- The trophy given to winners
- Founded: 1962; 64 years ago
- Abolished: 1980; 46 years ago
- Region: Morocco
- Teams: 6
- Last champions: (Spain) Atlético Madrid (1980)
- Most championships: (Spain) Atlético Madrid (3 titles)

The Intercontinental Mohammed-V Cup, also known as International Mohammed-V Cup, was an international football tournament in the Kingdom of Morocco held in the cities of Casablanca, Rabat, Fez, Meknes, Mohammedia, Settat and Marrakesh. It was organised by the Royal Moroccan Football Federation (FRMF) with the support of the Ministry of Youth and Sports (MJS) under the authority of the Confederation of African Football (CAF).

The trophy was named after King Mohammed-V, who died one year before the competition was established in 1962. The competition was contested and won by the most successful football teams in the world, such as Real Madrid, Barcelona, Bayern Munich, Atlético Madrid, Boca Juniors, Peñarol, among others. Spanish club Atlético Madrid is the most winning team with 3 titles won..

== Champions ==
The following is the list of finals played:

=== Finals ===
| Edition | Year | Champions | Runner-up | Score |
|---|---|---|---|---|
| 1 | 1962 | (France) Reims | (Italy) Inter-Milan | 2–1 |
| 2 | 1963 | (Socialist Federal Republic of Yugoslavia) Partizan | (Spain) Zaragoza | 2–0 |
| 3 | 1964 | (Argentina) Boca Juniors | (Spain) Real Madrid | 2–1 |
| 4 | 1965 | (Spain) Atlético Madrid | (Socialist Federal Republic of Yugoslavia) Partizan | 5–0 |
| 5 | 1966 | (Spain) Real Madrid | (Argentina) Boca Juniors | 1–1 (4–2 pen.) |
| 6 | 1967 | (Bulgaria) CSKA Sofia | (Morocco) FAR Rabat | 1–0 |
| 7 | 1968 | (Brazil) Flamengo | (Argentina) Racing Club | 3–2 |
| 8 | 1969 | (Spain) Barcelona | (Germany) Bayern Munich | 2–2 (4–3 pen.) |
| 9 | 1970 | (Spain) Atlético Madrid | (Morocco) FAR Rabat | 4–1 |
| 10 | 1971 | (Germany) Bayern Munich | (Socialist Federal Republic of Yugoslavia) Partizan | 3–2 |
| 11 | 1972 | (Argentina) Estudiantes DLP | (Netherlands) AFC Ajax | 1–1 (4–3 pen.) |
| 12 | 1973 | (Argentina) CA Independiente | (Netherlands) AFC Ajax | 1–0 |
| 13 | 1974 | (Uruguay) Peñarol | (Poland) Ruch Chorzów | 1–0 |
| 14 | 1975 | (Soviet Union) Dynamo Kyiv | (Hungary) Újpest FC | 3–2 |
| 15 | 1976 | (Belgium) Anderlecht | (France) OGC Nice | 2–1 |
| 16 | 1977 | Romania | (Czech Republic) Czechoslovakia | 3–1 |
| 17 | 1979 | (Morocco) Wydad AC | (Cameroon) Canon Yaoundé | 1–1 (4–3 pen.) |
| 18 | 1980 | (Spain) Atlético Madrid | (Brazil) Inter | 1–1 (5–4 pen.) |

== Galerie ==
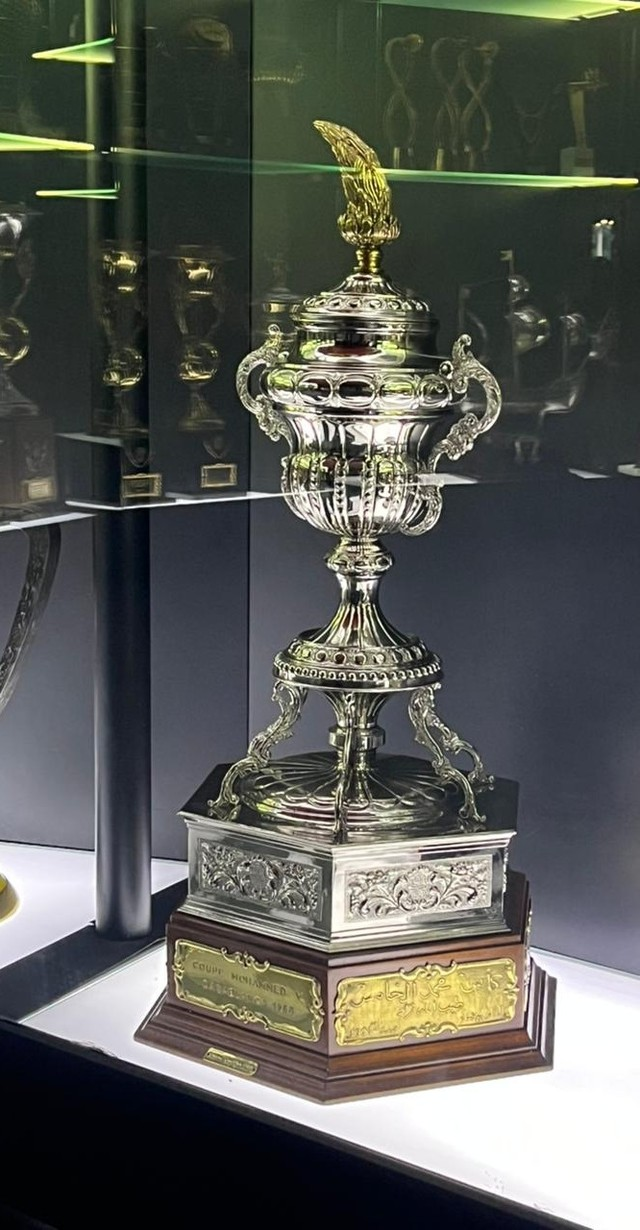
The Mohamed V Cup trophy from the museum of Flamengo

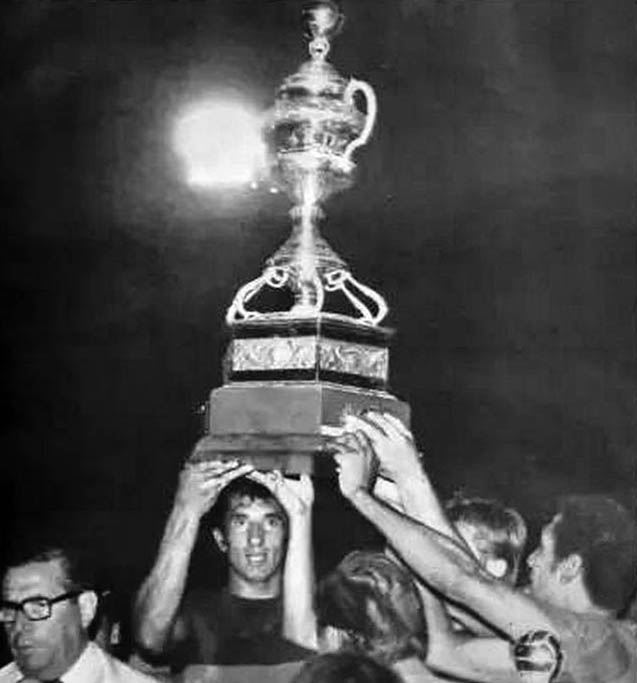
Players of Boca Juniors (along with captain Antonio Rattín) raising the trophy in 1964 after beating Real Madrid in the final

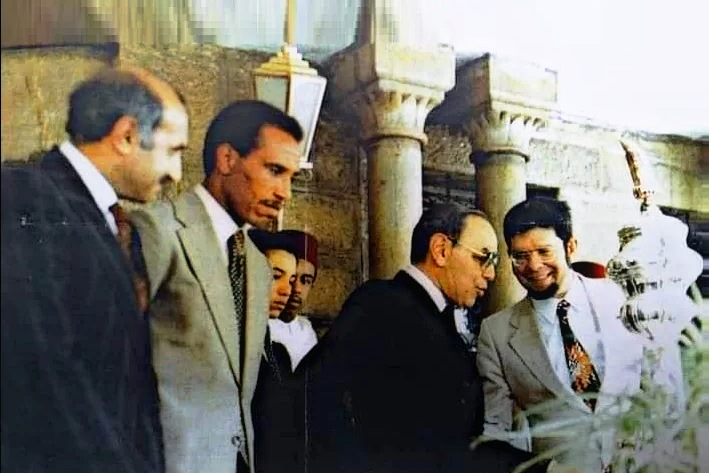
The king of Morocco Hassan II receives the WAC team with his Mohamed V Cup 1978's edition at the royal palace in Ifrane.
