= Moroccan Elite Cup =

- Organiser(s): Moroccan football league
- Founded: 1940
- Region: Morocco
- Teams: 8 (from 2026)
- Current champions: Wydad AC (U-14) (1 title)
- Most championships: Wydad AC (4 titles)

The Moroccan Elite Cup (Arabic: كأس النخبة المغربية) is a former soccer competition organized by the Service of Youth and Sports (SJS), guided by the Moroccan football league in the Morocco. It was created in 1940.

== List of competitions by season ==
1940–41

- Final (29 September 1940) :
  - US Athlétique 5–2 Racing AC

1941–42

- Semi-finals (21 September 1941) :
  - AS Casablanca 5–2 AS Rabat
  - Olympique MR - Racing AC

1944–45

- Semi-finals (1 April 1945) :
  - Racing AC 4–0 CS Marocain
  - Wydad AC 2–1 SA Marrakech
- Consolation match (2 April 1945) :
  - SA Marrakech 2–1 CS Marocain
- Final (2 April 1945) :
  - Racing AC 1–2 Wydad AC

1947–48

- Semi-finals (28 March 1948) :
  - Wydad AC 3–2 RU Alger
  - US Marocaine 1–1 Racing AC
- Consolation game (29 March 1948) :
  - US Marocaine 2–1 RU Alger
- Final (29 March 1948) :
  - Wydad AC 7–1 Racing AC

1950–51

- Semi-finals (26 August 1951) :
  - US Marocaine 0–1 Racing AC
  - Wydad AC 2–0 ASPTT Casablanca
- Consolation game (27 August 1951) :
  - US Marocaine 2–0 ASPTT Casablanca
- Final (27 August 1951) :
  - Wydad AC 1–0 Racing AC

1953–54

- Final (25 May 1954) :
  - Racing AC 1–0 US Marocaine

1955–56

- Semi-finals (18 November 1955) :
  - Fath US 1–0 Racing AC
  - CS Marocain 0–4 Wydad AC
- Consolation game (19 novembre 1955) :
  - CS Marocain 0–1 Racing AC
- Final (19 novembre 1955) :
  - Fath US 0–1 Wydad AC

== Awards ==
Édition	Winner	Score	Finalists	Stadium	Location
1940	US Athlétique	5–2	Racing AC	Stade Philip	Casablanca
1941	AS Casablanca	6–1	AS Rabat	Stade Belvédère	Rabat
1942	US Marocaine	3–0	SA Marrakech	Stade Philip	Casablanca
1943	US Marocaine (2)	7–2	Racing AC	Stade Philip	Casablanca
1944	édition non disputée				
1945	Wydad AC	2–1	Racing AC	Stade Philip	Casablanca
1946	AS Aviation	3–0	US Bourgogne	Stade de l'Aviation	Casablanca
1947	US Marocaine (3)	5–1	US Athlétique	Stade Philip	Casablanca
1948	Wydad AC (2)	7–1	Racing AC	Stade Philip	Casablanca
1949	Racing AC (minimes)	Championnat	Wydad AC (minimes)	Stade Philip	Casablanca
1950	édition non disputée				
1951	Wydad AC (3)	1–0	Racing AC	Stade Philip	Casablanca
1954	Racing AC (1)	1–0	US Marocaine	Stade Philip	Casablanca
1955	Wydad AC (4)	1–0	Fath US	Stade Belvédère	Rabat
1956	Fath US	2–1	Wydad AC	Stade Belvédère	Rabat

=== Performance by club ===
==== Only clubs that are still active ====
Club	Winners	Runners-up	Winning years
Wydad AC	4	2	1945, 1948, 1951, 1955
Racing AC	1	5	1954
Fath US	1	1	1956
