= 1964 Mohammed V Cup =

1964 1964 Mohammed V Cup
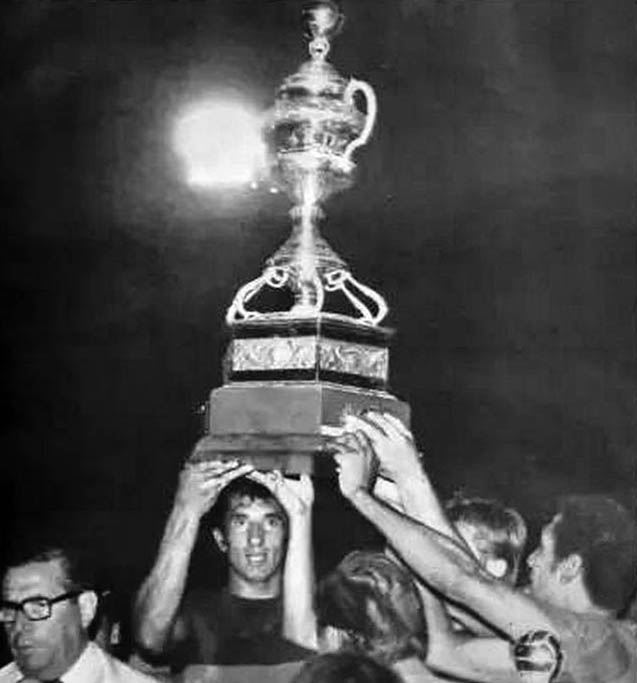
- Boca Juniors, champions

Tournament details
- Country: Morocco
- Venue: Stade d'Honneur
- Dates: 22–23 August
- Teams: 4

Final positions
- Champions: (Argentina) Boca Juniors (1st title)
- Runners-up: (Spain) Real Madrid
- Third place: (France) Saint-Étienne
- Fourth place: (Morocco) FAR Rabat

Tournament statistics
- Matches played: 4
- Goals scored: 15 (3.75 per match)
- Top goal scorer(s): (Argentina) Angel C. Rojas (Spain) Amancio (3 goals each)

The 1964 Mohamed V Cup Final was the 3rd. edition of the Mohammed V Cup, an annual football international competition hosted in Casablanca and named after King Mohammed V.

This edition, held in Stade d'Honneur in Meknes was contested by four teams, two from Europe, one from South America and one from the host country, all of them being the reigning champions of their respective leagues. Argentine side Boca Juniors was the winner after beating Saint-Étienne and Real Madrid in the final.

== Teams ==
Club	Qualification
(Argentina) Boca Juniors	1964 Primera División champion
(Spain) Real Madrid	1963–64 La Liga champion
(France) Saint-Étienne	1963–64 Division 1 champion
(Morocco) FAR Rabat	1963–64 Botola champion

== Venue ==
Meknes
Stade d'Honneur
Capacity: 20,000
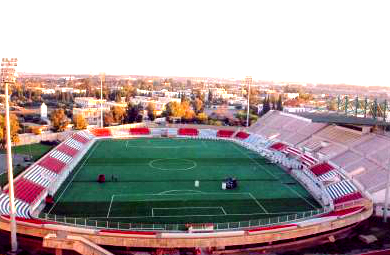

== Matches ==
=== Semifinals ===
Advanced to the final

Date	Team 1	Sco.	Team 2
23 Aug	(Morocco) FAR Rabat	0–4	(Spain) Real Madrid
23 Aug	(Argentina) Boca Juniors	3–0	(France) Saint-Étienne

22 August 1964

FAR Rabat (Morocco)	0–4	(Spain) Real Madrid
	Report	Amancio 20', 24', 26'; Morollón 87'

Stade d'Honneur, Meknes
Referee: ?

22 August 1964

Boca Juniors (Argentina)	3–0	(France) Saint-Étienne
A.C. Rojas 60'; Rulli 69'; González 84'	Report

Stade d'Honneur, Meknes
Referee: Keller

=== Third place ===
23 August 1964

FAR Rabat (Morocco)	2–3 (a.e.t.)	(France) Saint-Étienne
Youssef 55'; Mustapha 63'	Report	Guy 35' (?); Wienieski (?)

Stade d'Honneur, Meknes
Referee: ?

=== Final ===
1964 Mohammed V Cup Final
23 August 1964

Boca Juniors (Argentina)	2–1	(Spain) Real Madrid
A.C. Rojas 7', 74'	Report	Puskás 12'

Stade d'Honneur, Meknes
Referee: Loraux

Boca Juniors
Real Madrid

GK	1	(Argentina) Néstor Errea
DF	2	(Argentina) Rubén Magdalena
DF	3	(Argentina) Silvio Marzolini
DF	4	(Brazil) Ayres Morais
MF	5	(Argentina) Antonio Rattín
MF	6	(Brazil) Orlando Peçanha
FW	7	(Argentina) Juan Carlos Rulli
FW	8	(Argentina) Ángel C. Rojas
FW	9	(Argentina) Norberto Menéndez
FW	10	(Uruguay) Alcides Silveira
FW	11	(Argentina) Alberto M. González
Manager:
(Argentina) Aristóbulo Deambrossi

GK	1	(Spain) José Araquistáin
DF		(Spain) Isidro
DF		(Spain) José Santamaría
DF		(Spain) Antonio Mira
DF		(Spain) Ignacio Zoco
MF		(France) Lucien Muller
FW		(Spain) Amancio
FW		(Spain) Félix Ruiz	(substituted off) a'
FW		(Spain) Ramón Grosso
FW	10	(Spain) Ferenc Puskás
FW	11	(Spain) Francisco Gento
Substitutes:
MF		(Spain) Pipi Suárez	(substituted on) a'
Manager:
(Spain) Miguel Muñoz

== Standings ==
Team	Pld.	W	D	L	GF	GA	GD
(Argentina) Boca Juniors (C)	2	2	0	0	5	1	+4
(Spain) Real Madrid	2	1	0	1	5	2	+3
(France) Saint-Étienne	2	1	0	1	3	5	-2
(Morocco) FAR Rabat	2	0	0	2	2	7	-5

== Winners ==
1964 Mohammed V Cup
(Argentina)
Boca Juniors
1st title

== Aftermath ==
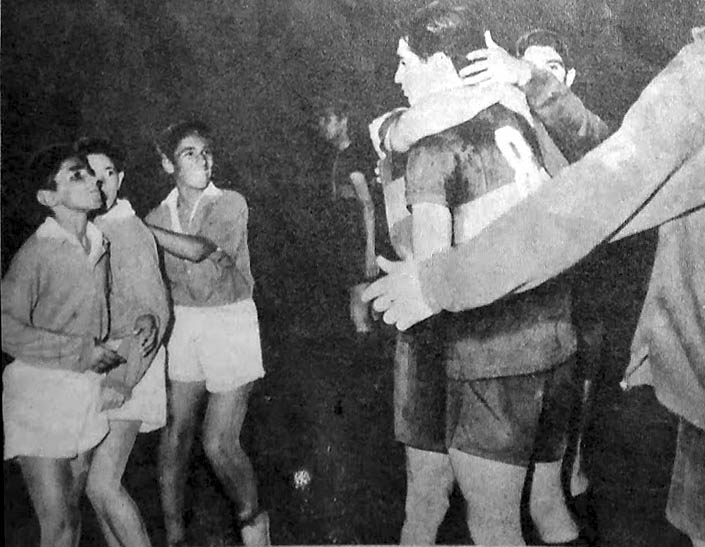
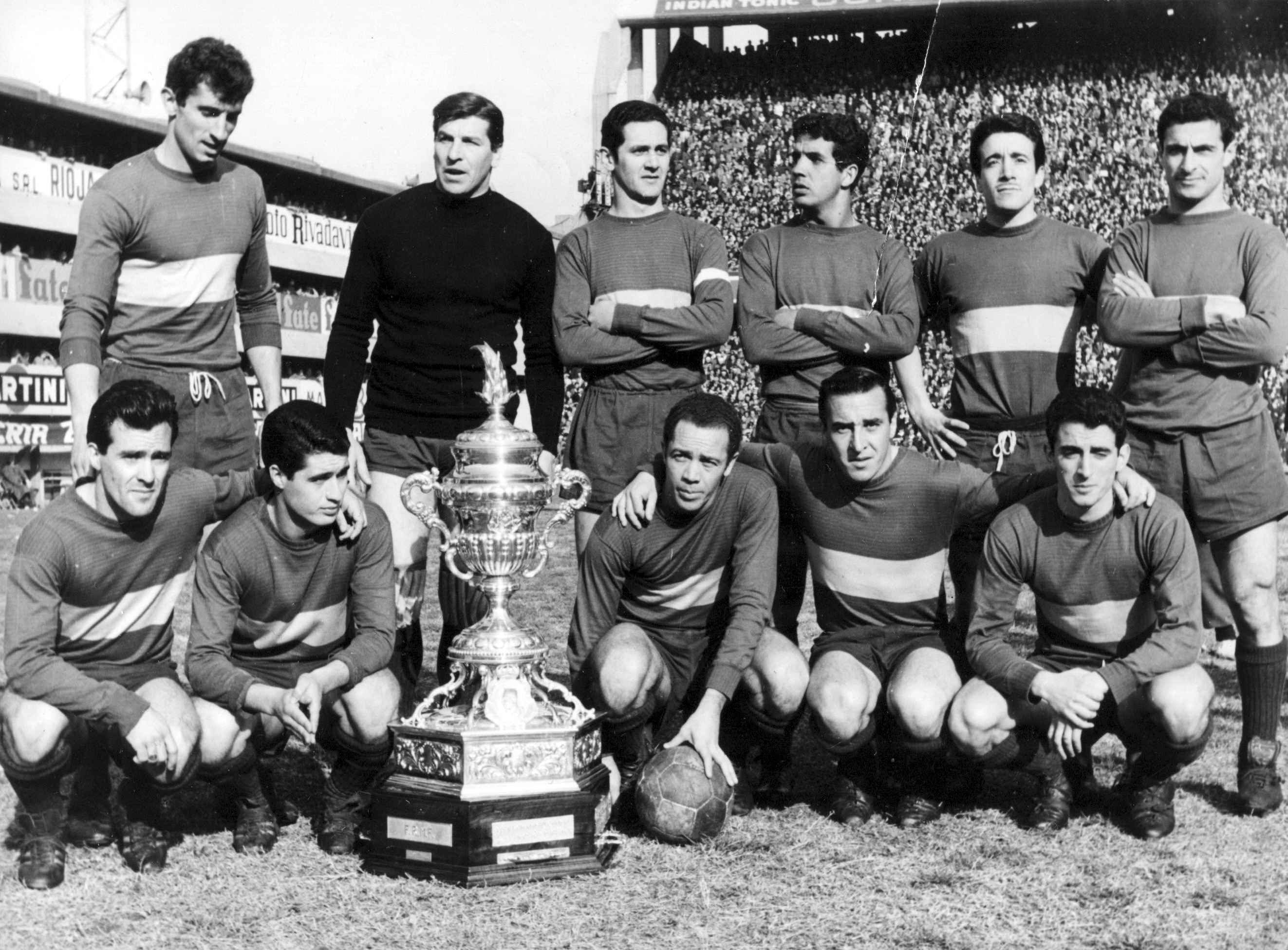
(Left): Forward Angel Rojas, MVP of the final, celebrating the victory; (right): Boca Juniors players posing with the Mohammed V trophy at La Bombonera

The Mohamed-V Cup trophy was the first intercontinental cup won by Boca Juniors, as neither the club nor any Argentine team had participated in similar competitions such as Copa Rio or the Small Club World Cup. One year before, Boca Juniors had failed to win the 1963 Copa Libertadores after it was defeated by Brazilian side Santos FC led by Pelé in the finals.

On the other hand, it was the third time Boca Juniors played Real Madrid in their history, after the first meeting during the successful tour to Europe in 1925 (Boca won 1–0), and a friendly match when Real Madrid toured on the Americas in 1927, which was also the first time that club visited the landmass, in a tour that extended for over three months from Buenos Aires to New York.

The Copa Iberoamericana in 1994 was the first official matches between both clubs recognized by the REFF and CONMEBOL, while the 2000 Intercontinental Cup would be the first official match between both clubs recognized by UEFA. Boca Juniors won 2–1 achieving their second intercontinental title.
