= Independence Cup (Morocco) =

1956 Independence Cup (Morocco)
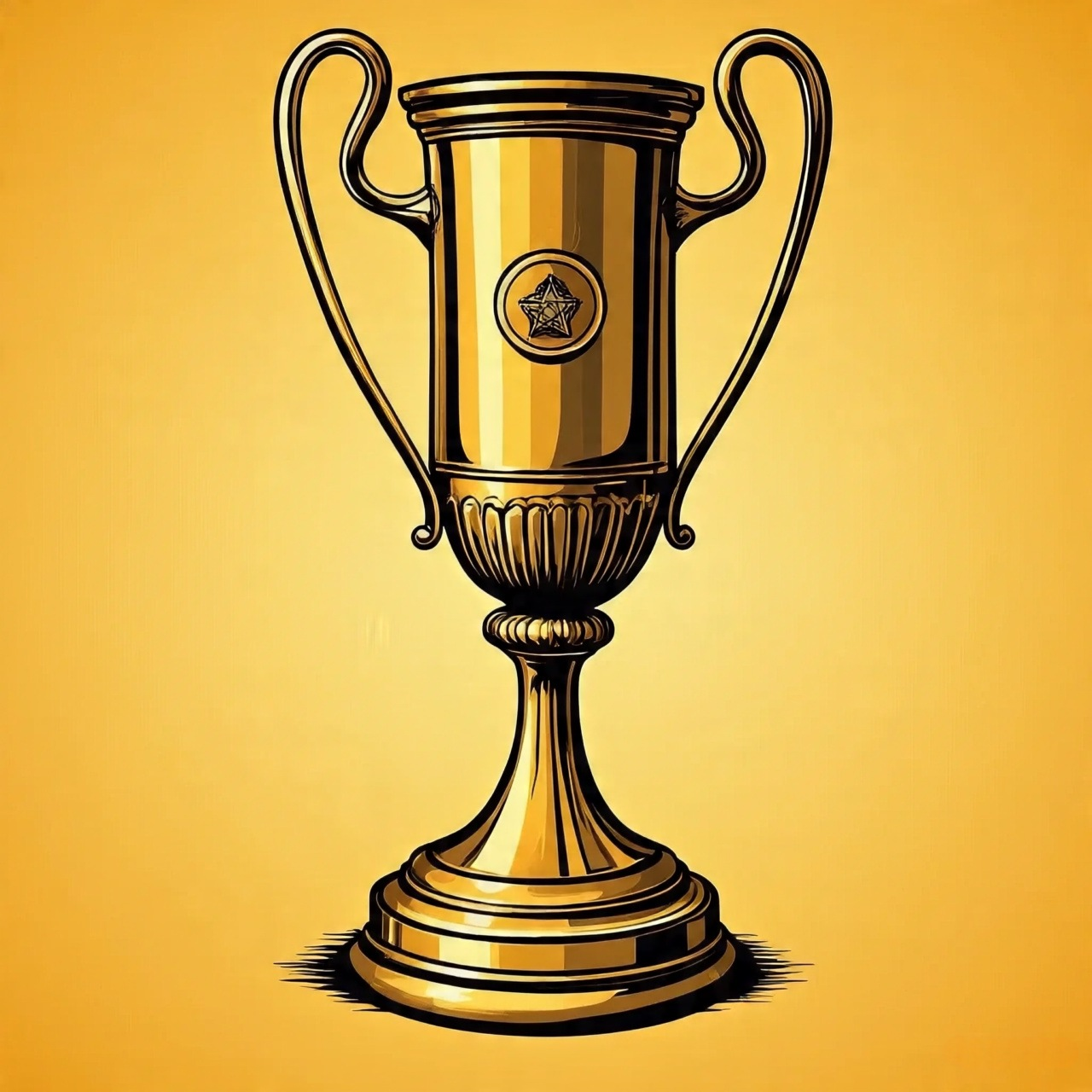
- Competition's logo

Tournament details
- Host country: Morocco
- Dates: March and April 1956
- Teams: All FRMF clubs

Final positions
- Champions: Wydad AC (1st title)
- Runners-up: ASTP Maroc

The Independence Cup is a Moroccan football competition organized by the Royal Moroccan Football Federation (FRMF) in partnership with the Youth and Sports Service (SJS), it brought together all the FRMF clubs in March and April, 1956.

The final match was won by Wydad AC, who defeated ASTP Morocco in the final by the score of 2–0.

== Winners ==
Season	Winner	Final Score	Runner-up	Venue	Date
1956	Wydad AC	2-0	ASTP Morocco	Rabat	April 7, 1956
