= Mustapha Bettache =

Moroccan footballer (1931–2005)

Personal information
- Date of birth: 20 January 1931
- Place of birth: Casablanca, French Morocco
- Date of death: 13 October 2005 (aged 74)
- Place of death: Morocco
- Position: Defender

Senior career*
Years	Team	Apps	(Gls)
1950–1956	Wydad Casablanca		
1956–1963	Nîmes		
1964–1966	Raja Casablanca		

International career
1960–1963	Morocco	8	(1)

Managerial career
- 1972–1973: Ittihad Khemisset
- * Club domestic league appearances and goals

Mustapha Bettache (20 January 1931 – 13 October 2005) was a Moroccan football player and manager. A defender, he played for clubs in Morocco and France as well as the Morocco national team.

== Club career ==
Born in the Habous neighborhood of Casablanca, Bettache began playing senior football with local side Wydad Casablanca. He would play professionally in France's Ligue 1 with Nîmes for nearly eight seasons. He was suspended from playing for six months in 1963, and returned to Morocco immediately after where he finished his career with Raja Casablanca.

== International career ==
Bettache made several appearances for the full Morocco national team, including qualifying matches for the 1962 FIFA World Cup.

== Managerial career ==
After he retired from playing, Bettache became a football manager. He managed Ittihad Khemisset for several seasons, leading the club to the 1973 Moroccan Throne Cup final. He also managed COD Meknès, Olympique Club de Khouribga, Difaâ Hassani El Jadidi and SCC Mohammédia.
