= Roberto Digón =

Argentine politician and sports executive (1935–2022)

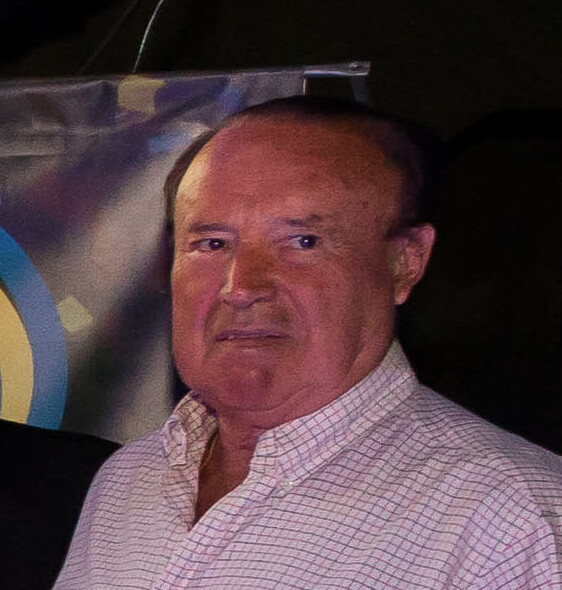

Member of the Argentine Chamber of Deputies
- In office 10 December 1993 – 10 December 1997
- In office 10 December 1985 – 9 July 1989

Personal details
- Born: Roberto Secundino Digón; 25 July 1935 Buenos Aires, Argentina
- Died: 30 January 2022 (aged 86) Buenos Aires, Argentina
- Party: PJ

Roberto Secundino Digón (25 July 1935 – 30 January 2022) was an Argentine politician and sports executive.

== Biography ==
A member of the Justicialist Party, he served in the Argentine Chamber of Deputies from 1985 to 1989 and again from 1993 to 1997.

He died of COVID-19 in Buenos Aires on 30 January 2022, at the age of 86.
