= István Balogh =

István Balogh may refer to:

- István Balogh (footballer) (1912–1992), Hungarian footballer
- István Balogh (politician) (1894–1976), Hungarian dissident and priest
