= Casablanca derby =

Derby between the Moroccan football clubs Raja and Wydad

Casablanca Derby
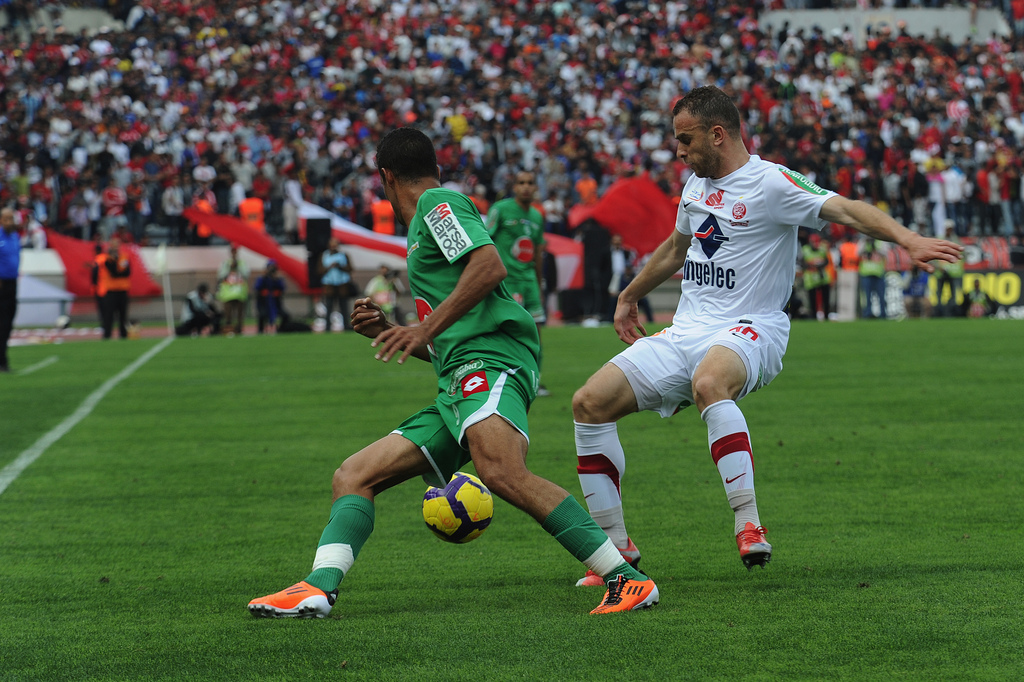
- Zakaria Zerouali of Raja CA and Khalid Sekkat of Wydad AC during a Casablanca derby in 2010
- Location: Casablanca, Morocco
- Teams: Raja CA; Wydad AC
- First meeting: Raja CA 1–0 Wydad AC; 1956–57 Botola (10 February 1957)
- Latest meeting: Raja CA 0–1 Wydad AC; 2025–26 Botola Pro (9 May 2026)
- Next meeting: Wydad AC v Raja CA; 2025–26 Botola Pro (2026)
- Stadiums: Stade Mohammed V

Statistics
- Total meetings: 158
- Most wins: Raja CA (46)
- Top scorer: Said Ghandi (7 goals)
- Largest victory: Raja CA 5–1 Wydad AC; 1995–96 Moroccan Throne Cup (8 February 1996)

The Casablanca Derby (Arabic: ديربي الدارالبيضاء) is the football match in Morocco between Casablanca rivals Raja CA and Wydad AC. Traditionally played in the Stade Mohamed V, it is considered as one of the fiercest derbies in the world.

Since the beginning of Botola, the top tier of the Moroccan football league system, the two teams have never been relegated and have always played each other every season whether in the league or in Throne Cup. They faced each other outside of national competitions once, during the 2019 Arab Cup of Champion Clubs. There was originally a social dimension to the rivalry, with Wydad being associated with wealthier supporters and Raja with the working class, these socioeconomic associations have faded over time, and supporters of the two clubs now come from more varied backgrounds. The post-1980s period was especially marked by rivalry between the two teams, which intensified even more over in the 2000s with the emergence of ultras groups.

The Casablanca Derby is considered the premier football game in Morocco due to its involvement of two of the most popular and successful clubs in Morocco as well as its number of matches, which exceeded the 150 in 2022. It is the most played matchup in Moroccan football history.

The top scorer in the history of the Casablanca Derby is Said Ghandi with 7 goals, followed by Mohsine Moutouali and Mouhcine Iajour with 6 goals each.

== History ==
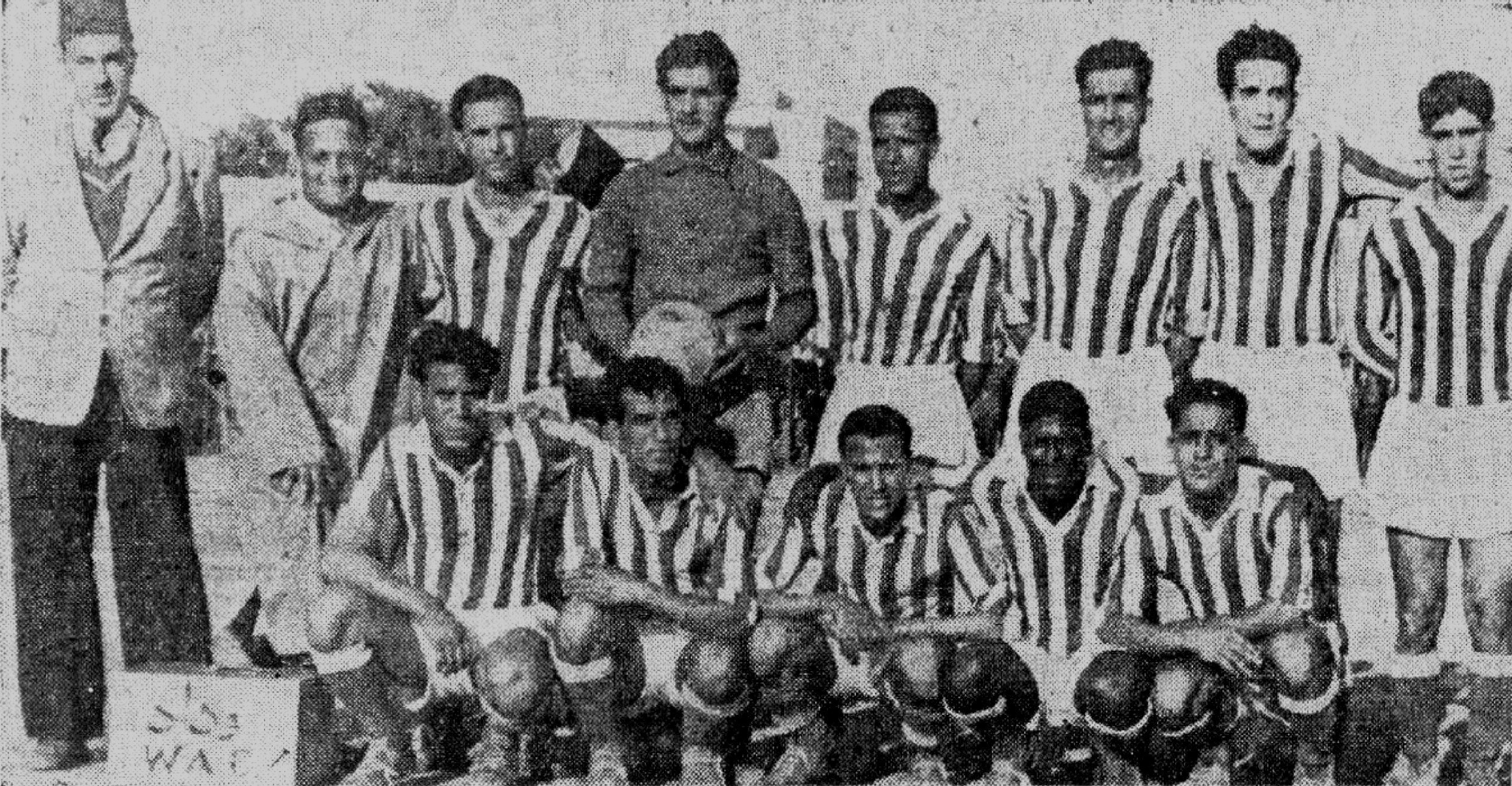
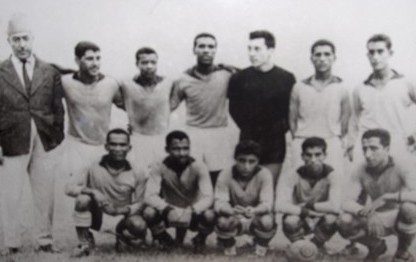
Wydad in 1950 (top) and Raja in 1957 (bottom), both under coach Père Jégo

Wydad Casablanca has historically been associated with the Moroccan monarchy and the upper- and middle-classes, due to its close ties with the Moroccan royal family and one-time backing of King Mohammed V before his death in 1961. The club's colors, red and white, are also said to symbolize the Moroccan monarchy. The current King of Morocco, Mohammed VI, is also a supporter of the club.

Raja Casablanca, on the other hand, has traditionally been associated with leftist and populist politics and with the Moroccan Workers Union, to which many of its founders and presidents belonged. The club was founded in 1949 by a group of leftist activists and intellectuals who wanted to create a team that represented the working class. The club's colors, green and white, are said to symbolize the hope and renewal of the Moroccan people.

On February 10, 1957, the first meeting took place between the two rivals, and witnessed Raja's victory 1–0 at Stade Philip in Casablanca.

In 1978, Raja players withdrew from the match against Wydad during the last 10 minutes of the second-half, alleging referee mistreatment after conceding a penalty with a red card to their goalkeeper. Raja players did not accept the referee's decision and left the stadium by order of their captain Mohamed Fakhir while Wydad player Pitchou sat on the ball and waited to score the penalty.

In 1996, Raja defeated Wydad 5–1 in the Moroccan Throne Cup quarts-finals. This score is the highest between the two rivals.

On April 6, 2001, Wydad initially won 3–0, but Raja complained about the illegal participation of the substitute Abdelhaq Ait Laarif who was registered with both Wydad and Étoile de Casablanca. The Moroccan federation accorded the win to Raja.

On September 29, 2001, Youssef Belkhouja, a Wydad player, died of a heart attack on the pitch during the 100th derby, which was part of the semifinals for the Moroccan Throne Cup.

On 24 May 2006, there was a fierce competition between the two rivals to clinch the league title. Raja scored first with a penalty by Abdellatif Jrindou, that result would have given Raja the title; but at the end of the match (at the 90+6 minute), a staggering strike from a long distance by Hicham Louissi gave Wydad the draw needed to win the league for the 16th time after 13 years of the last cup.

On October 20, 2007, during an encounter between rival team supporters, Hamza Eddali, a Wydad fan who was 17, died. He is to date the last person killed in the Casablanca derby.

On April 18, 2010, after Raja beat Wydad with a score of 1–0, a fight broke out between Wydad and Raja fans. Over one hundred people were arrested.

In 2012, Wydad requested the FIFA and Royal Moroccan Football Federation to count the 5 titles that the club won in the regional championship organized during the Colonial Era in Morocco by French authorities before the creation of the Moroccan federation in 1956 as Botola titles. Their request was accepted and so, increased Wydad's Botola titles from 12 to 17. Wydad is the only club in Morocco to have their titles from the colonial era (before 1956) admitted by the FIFA.

In November 2019, the two rivals met in the second round of the Arab Club Championship. This was the first time that the derby took place in a non-local competition. The first game ended 1–1, with Wydad leading by away goals. The second leg was one of if not the most epic match in derby history, with Wydad going up 4–1 with 15 minutes to play and Raja coming back to score in the 94th minute to make it 4–4, with Raja progressing on away goals. This is the record for most combined goals in derby history but the match is also notable for its extraordinary atmosphere, with numerous Tifos being displayed and fireworks and flares going off throughout the match, the latter of which there were so many it looked at times that the stands were on fire.

== Results ==
=== Key ===
- SF = Semi-finals
- QF = Quarter-finals
- R16 = Round of 16
- R32 = Round of 32

Raja win Draw Wydad win

=== Botola Pro ===
These are the meetings in the Botola Pro

#	Season	Date	R.	Home team	Score	Away team	Goals (home)	Goals (away)
1	1956–1957	10 February 1957	12	Raja	1–0	Wydad	Laâchir (43)	–
2	1956–1957	2 June 1957	27	Wydad	3–0	Raja	Kadmiri (20), Benchekroun (65), Chtouki (85 p.)	–
3	1957–1958		9	Wydad	1–1	Raja	Gomez (?)	Acila (?)
4	1957–1958		24	Raja	0–0	Wydad	–	–
5	1958–1959		1	Wydad	1–2	Raja	Nino (?)	Hanoun (10), Abdenbi (81)
6	1958–1959		14	Raja	0–2	Wydad	–	Khalfi (14), Brahim (17)
7	1959–1960		5	Wydad	0–0	Raja	–	–
8	1959–1960		18	Raja	2–1	Wydad	Hanoun (27, 55)	?
9	1960–1961		7	Wydad	0–0	Raja	–	–
10	1960–1961		20	Raja	2–0	Wydad	Hanoun (?), Abdenbi (?)	–
11	1961–1962		8	Raja	1–0	Wydad	Hanoun (?)	–
12	1961–1962		21	Wydad	1–0	Raja	Driss (61)	–
13	1962–1963		9	Raja	1–1	Wydad	Ouezzani (?)	?
14	1962–1963		22	Wydad	0–1	Raja	–	Aliouate (?)
14	1963–1964		9	Raja	0–1	Wydad	–	Tibari (14)
15	1963–1964		22	Wydad	1–1	Raja	?	Sakim (?)
16	1964–1965		9	Wydad	1–1	Raja	?	Ghandi (?)
17	1964–1965		22	Raja	1–2	Wydad	Aliouate (?)	Mahjoub (77), Mustapha (80)
18	1965–1966		12	Raja	0–0	Wydad	–	–
19	1965–1966	29 May 1966	25	Wydad	0–0	Raja	–	–
20	1966–1967			Raja	0–0	Wydad	–	–
21	1966–1967			Wydad	0–0	Raja	–	–
22	1967–1968		3	Wydad	1–3	Raja	?	Benini (?, ?), Zarhouny (?)
23	1967–1968		20	Raja	0–0	Wydad	–	–
24	1968–1969		8	Wydad	1–0	Raja	Zahid (69)	–
25	1968–1969		23	Raja	1–1	Wydad	Azhar (?)	?
26	1969–1970		3	Wydad	0–0	Raja	–	–
27	1969–1970		18	Raja	0–2	Wydad	–	Kébir (24, 42)
28	1970–1971		7	Raja	0–0	Wydad	–	–
29	1970–1971		22	Wydad	0–0	Raja	–	–
30	1971–1972		1	Raja	0–0	Wydad	–	–
31	1971–1972		16	Wydad	1–1	Raja	Samrhouni (90)	Ghandi (69)
32	1972–1973		5	Wydad	1–0	Raja	Maarouf (?)	–
33	1972–1973		22	Raja	1–0	Wydad	Petchou (90)	–
34	1973–1974		6	Raja	1–0	Wydad	Ghandi (?)	–
34	1973–1974		21	Wydad	0–0	Raja	–	–
35	1974–1975			Raja	1–1	Wydad	Ghandi (?)	?
36	1974–1975			Wydad	0–0	Raja	–	–
37	1975–1976		7	Raja	0–0	Wydad	–	–
38	1975–1976		22	Wydad	1–1	Raja	?	Fethi (?)
39	1976–1977		8	Raja	1–1	Wydad	Aziz Jawad (?)	?
40	1976–1977		23	Wydad	2–3	Raja	Cherif (?), Ahardane (?)	El Andaloussi (?), Lâarabi (?), Dolmy (?)
41	1977–1978	30 October 1977	7	Wydad	1–1	Raja	Petchou (?)	Beggar (?)
42	1977–1978	26 March 1978	22	Raja	2–2	Wydad	Ghandi (52), Mokhles (83 p.)	Mounatik (60 p.), Lecheheb (?)
43	1978–1979		7	Raja	0–1	Wydad	(Note: After the controversial sending-off of Raja's goalkeeper in the 83rd minute, with Wydad leading 1-0, a dispute erupted and the Raja players refused to continue the match. The penalty was never taken. A few days later, the Royal Moroccan Football Federation (FRMF) declared Wydad the winners with a score of 1-0.)	
44	1978–1979		22	Wydad	0–0	Raja	–	–
45	1979–1980	23 December 1979	8	Raja	1–2	Wydad	Zahir (54)	Lecheheb (8), Mellouk (90 o.g.)
46	1979–1980	4 May 1980	23	Wydad	0–2	Raja	–	Ghandi (?), Lâarabi (?)
47	1980–1981		3	Raja	1–0	Wydad	Fethi (?)	–
48	1980–1981		22	Wydad	1–2	Raja	Cherif (?)	Lâarabi (?), Beggar (?)
49	1981–1982	19 December 1981	11	Wydad	1–0	Raja	Ennaji (82)	–
50	1981–1982	8 May 1982	28	Raja	0–0	Wydad	–	–
51	1982–1983	4 December 1982	12	Raja	0–0	Wydad	–	–
52	1982–1983	22 May 1983	27	Wydad	1–1	Raja	?	Seddiki (?)
53	1983–1984	21 January 1984	12	Wydad	2–2	Raja	Beggar (20, 80)	Hariri (25), Acha (70)
54	1983–1984	26 May 1984	27	Raja	3–1	Wydad	Souadi (28, 41), El Haddaoui (77)	?
55	1984–1985	25 November 1984	12	Raja	2–0	Wydad	Ouhamouch (31, 59)	–
56	1984–1985	12 May 1985	27	Wydad	1–2	Raja	Zhour (?)	El Maâtaoui (?), Souadi (?)
58	1985–1986	12 November 1985	6	Wydad	1–0	Raja	Fakhreddine (31)	–
59	1985–1986	22 February 1986	25	Raja	1–1	Wydad	Acha (?)	Fakhreddine (?)
60	1986–1987	25 April 1987		Wydad	1–1	Raja	Benabicha (? p.)	Bartal (? p.)
61	1986–1987	23 May 1987		Raja	0–0	Wydad	–	–
62	1987–1988		9	Wydad	1–0	Raja	Mahmoudi (30)	–
63	1987–1988		26	Raja	1–0	Wydad	Bartal (?)	–
64	1988–1989	5 February 1989	12	Raja	0–1	Wydad	–	Ndao (?)
65	1988–1989	4 June 1989	27	Wydad	3–1	Raja	Ibrahima (?, ?), Ndao (?)	Diagne (?)
66	1989–1990	26 November 1989	10	Wydad	2–1	Raja	Ndao (45), Nader (78)	Jamal (29 p.)
67	1989–1990	5 May 1990	25	Raja	0–1	Wydad	–	Nader (33)
68	1990–1991	8 December 1990	10	Raja	1–1	Wydad	El Maâtaoui (90+2)	Daoudi (?)
69	1990–1991	5 May 1991	25	Wydad	0–1	Raja	–	Bark (?)
70	1991–1992	24 November 1991	12	Wydad	1–0	Raja	Bouyboud (82)	–
71	1991–1992	10 May 1992	27	Raja	1–1	Wydad	Madih (?)	Ndao (?)
72	1992–1993	13 December 1992	10	Raja	1–2	Wydad	Khalif (?)	Daoudi (?), Fertout (?)
73	1992–1993	May 1993	25	Wydad	2–2	Raja	Fertout (?), Daoudi (?)	Khalif (?), Oustad (?)
74	1993–1994	5 December 1993	10	Wydad	0–0	Raja	–	–
75	1993–1994	3 April 1994	25	Raja	1–0	Wydad	Nejjary (?)	–
76	1994–1995	18 December 1994	12	Wydad	2–1	Raja	Bouyboud (?, ?)	Badiane (?)
77	1994–1995	21 May 1995	27	Raja	1–0	Wydad	Serji (?)	–
78	1995–1996	11 February 1996	12	Wydad	0–3	Raja	–	Nejjary (?), Khalif (?), Nazir (?)
79	1995–1996	26 May 1996	27	Raja	0–1	Wydad	–	Boujemâa (?)
80	1996–1997	3 November 1996		Wydad	2–2	Raja	Boujemâa (66, 67)	Ogandaga (16), Jinani (32)
81	1996–1997	17 May 1997		Raja	2–2	Wydad	Mesraoui (?), Amedah (?)	Nacer (?), Daoudi (?)
82	1997–1998	2 November 1997		Wydad	0–0	Raja	–	–
83	1997–1998	29 March 1998		Raja	1–1	Wydad	Jrindou (78 p.)	Mbaye (44)
84	1998–1999	13 December 1998	12	Raja	0–0	Wydad	–	–
85	1998–1999	30 May 1999	27	Wydad	0–1	Raja	–	Rizki (85)
86	1999–2000	21 November 1999	10	Wydad	0–0	Raja	–	–
87	1999–2000	14 May 2000	25	Raja	1–1	Wydad	Safri (73)	El Afoui (21)
88	2000–2001	2 December 2000	10	Raja	1–1	Wydad	El Moubarki (88 p.)	Abdelfattah (35)
89	2000–2001	6 April 2001	25	Wydad	0–1	Raja	(Note: Raja was awarded a 1–0 win after Wydad fielded an ineligible player.)	
90	2001–2002	9 December 2001	12	Wydad	2–0	Raja	Madihi (37), Benchrifa (53 p.)	–
91	2001–2002	19 May 2002	27	Raja	0–2	Wydad	–	Benchrifa (16 p., 45+1 p.)
92	2002–2003	19 January 2003	12	Raja	1–0	Wydad	Suleiman (73)	–
93	2002–2003	15 June 2003	27	Wydad	0–3	Raja	–	Bidoudane (3, 63), Nater (52)
94	2003–2004	16 November 2003	10	Wydad	0–1	Raja	–	Diallo (55)
95	2003–2004	2 May 2004	25	Raja	2–0	Wydad	Bidoudane (73), Koné (78)	–
96	2004–2005	5 December 2004	10	Raja	1–1	Wydad	Mesloub (6)	Talha (3)
97	2004–2005	30 April 2005	25	Wydad	0–1	Raja	–	Alloudi (90+2)
98	2005–2006	4 December 2005	10	Wydad	1–2	Raja	Talbi (56)	Maïga (67), Alloudi (72)
100	2005–2006	24 May 2006	25	Raja	1–1	Wydad	Jrindou (50 p.)	Louissi (90+5)
101	2006–2007	12 November 2006	5	Raja	0–1	Wydad	–	Jouiâa (39)
102	2006–2007	18 February 2007	20	Wydad	1–1	Raja	Abdelghani (81)	Laurens (66)
103	2007–2008	24 November 2007	8	Raja	2–0	Wydad	Jlaïdi (41), Ouhaki (45+3)	–
104	2007–2008	23 March 2008	23	Wydad	0–1	Raja	–	Senghor (45+1)
105	2008–2009	16 November 2008	11	Wydad	0–0	Raja	–	–
106	2008–2009	3 April 2009	26	Raja	0–1	Wydad	–	Jouiâa (4)
107	2009–2010	20 December 2009	11	Raja	1–1	Wydad	Najdi (87)	Ait Laarif (9)
108	2009–2010	18 April 2010	26	Wydad	0–1	Raja	–	Baïla (41)
109	2010–2011	4 December 2010	10	Raja	1–2	Wydad	Tair (53)	Iajour (20, 90+3)
110	2010–2011	10 April 2011	25	Wydad	1–1	Raja	Benkajjane (70)	Tair (78)
111	2011–2012	31 December 2011	13	Wydad	0–0	Raja	–	–
112	2011–2012	6 May 2012	28	Raja	0–1	Wydad	–	Iajour (90+1)
113	2012–2013	16 December 2012	12	Raja	1–1	Wydad	Abourazzouk (68)	Ondama (17)
114	2012–2013	29 April 2013	27	Wydad	1–1	Raja	Sekkat (31)	Menkari (63 o.g.)
115	2013–2014	24 November 2013	9	Wydad	1–1	Raja	Kone (25)	Kouko (88)
116	2013–2014	6 April 2014	24	Raja	2–0	Wydad	Iajour (55), Moutouali (90+3)	–
117	2014–2015	30 November 2014	10	Wydad	2–1	Raja	Hajhouj (28), Kone (57)	El Amrani (69 o.g.)
118	2014–2015	11 April 2015	25	Raja	2–2	Wydad	Osaguona (62), Aqqal (90+1)	Belmkadem (77 o.g.), El Moutaraji (89)
119	2015–2016	20 December 2015	12	Wydad	0–0	Raja	–	–
120	2015–2016	8 May 2016	27	Raja	3–0	Wydad	Osaguona (20), Hafidi (42), Erraki (90+3)	–
121	2016–2017	27 November 2016	10	Raja	0–0	Wydad	–	–
122	2016–2017	23 April 2017	25	Wydad	1–0	Raja	Atouchi (31)	–
123	2017–2018	10 February 2018	10	Wydad	1–2	Raja	Boutayeb (20 o.g.)	Iajour (33), Benoun (88)
124	2017–2018	14 April 2018	25	Raja	1–1	Wydad	Benoun (88)	Atouchi (37)
125	2018–2019	6 January 2019	10	Raja	0–1	Wydad	–	El Haddad (78)
126	2018–2019	21 April 2019	25	Wydad	2–2	Raja	El Karti (13), Saidi (45+1)	S. Rahimi (21), Iajour (72)
127	2019–2020	22 December 2019	10	Raja	1–0	Wydad	Ahaddad (81)	–
128	2019–2020	24 September 2020	25	Wydad	0–0	Raja	–	–
129	2020–2021	21 March 2021	10	Wydad	2–0	Raja	Dari (4), El Amloud (15)	–
130	2020–2021	3 July 2021	25	Raja	1–2	Wydad	S. Rahimi (57 p.)	El Amloud (15), El Moutaraji (70)
131	2021–2022	6 November 2021	10	Wydad	1–1	Raja	Benyachou (77)	Hadhoudi (79)
132	2021–2022	16 June 2022	25	Raja	2–0	Wydad	Moutouali (45+3 p., 86 p.)	–
133	2022–2023	23 October 2022	6	Wydad	2–1	Raja	El Hassouni (56), Zola (80)	Nahiri (90 p.)
134	2022–2023	5 April 2023	21	Raja	2–2	Wydad	Bouzok (39 p.), Boulacsoute (67)	Zola (45+3), El Hassouni (90+10 p.)
135	2023–2024	3 January 2024	14	Wydad	0–2	Raja	–	Ait Brayem (51 o.g.), Zrida (64)
136	2023–2024	02 June 2024	29	Raja	1–0	Wydad	Ennafati (90+2)	–
137	2024–2025	22 November 2024	11	Raja	1–1	Wydad	Sakho (53)	Rayhi (78)
138	2024–2025	12 April 2025	26	Wydad	1–1	Raja	Rayhi (18 p.)	H. Rahimi (27)
139	2025–2026	29 October 2025	5	Wydad	0–0	Raja	–	–
140	2025–2026	9 May 2026	20	Raja	0–1	Wydad	–	Bakasu (39)

=== Throne Cup ===
These are the meetings in the Moroccan Throne Cup

Team won the competition that season

#	Season	Date	R.	Home team	Away team	Score	Goals (home)	Goals (away)
1	1963–1964	17 May 1964	SF	Raja	Wydad	0–0	–	–
2	1963–1964	19 May 1964	SF	Wydad	Raja	1–0	Khalfi (?)	–
3	1964–1965	21 Mars 1965	QF	Raja	Wydad	2–1	Aliouate (45), Ghandi (81)	?
4	1973–1974		SF	Wydad	Raja	1–1 (Note: Raja won 4–3 on penalties.)	Shaita (?)	Lâarabi (?)
5	1989–1990	October 1990	R32	Wydad	Raja	2–2	Ndao (79), Fakhreddine (85)	Bark (60), Mensah (69)
6	1989–1990	October 1990	R32	Raja	Wydad	1–0	Fadel (31 o.g.)	–
7	1992–1993	9 Mars 1994	QF	Wydad	Raja	1–2	Daoudi (?)	Fadel (88 o.g.), Nejjary (102 p.)
8	1995–1996	18 February 1996	QF	Raja	Wydad	5–1	Sellami (19), Khalif (26 p., 41), Nazir (55, 58)	Loumari (83)
9	1997–1998	4 February 1998	QF	Wydad	Raja	2–2	Allali (?), Lakhouil (? p.)	Londo (? p.), Amedah (?)
10	1997–1998	6 February 1998	QF	Raja	Wydad	0–1	–	Mbaye (40)
11	2000–2001	29 September 2001	QF	Wydad	Raja	1–0	El Kaddouri (96)	–
12	2002–2003	11 October 2003	SF	Wydad	Raja	1–1 (Note: Wydad won 12–11 on penalties.)	Benchrifa (75 p.)	Suleiman (21)
13	2006–2007	20 October 2007	QF	Raja	Wydad	0–2	–	Bidoudane (81, 90+3)
14	2011–2012	6 November 2012	SF	Wydad	Raja	1–3	Ondama (82)	Moutouali (89 p.), Salhi (115), Hafidi (118)
15	2020–2021	7 July 2022	QF	Wydad	Raja	2–0	Attiat-Allah (10), El Moutaraji (62)	–
16	2021–2022	9 July 2023	SF	Wydad	Raja	0–1	–	Zola (18 o.g.)

=== Arab Club Champions Cup ===
These are the meetings in the Arab Club Champions Cup

Team won the competition that season

#	Season	Date	R.	Home team	Away team	Score	Goals (home)	Goals (away)
1	2019–2020	2 November 2019	R16	Raja	Wydad	1–1	Ngoma	El Haddad
2	2019–2020	23 November 2019	R16	Wydad	Raja	4–4	Nahiri (12 p.), El Hassouni (56), El Kaabi (58), Aouk (72)	Moutouali (50 p., 89 p.) Ahaddad (74), Malango (90+4)

== Statistics ==
=== Overall match statistics ===
As of 09 May 2026

Competition	Matches	Wins		Draws	Goals	
Competition	Matches	RCA	WAC	Draws	RCA	WAC
Botola Pro	140	39	34	67	121	108
Throne Cup	16	7	6	3	20	17
Arab Club Champions Cup	2	0	0	2	5	5
Total	158	46	40	72	146	130

=== Honours ===
Wydad leads Raja in terms of overall trophies, while both have three titles in the CAF Champions League.

- Numbers with this background indicate the record in the competition.

Raja CA	Competition	Wydad AC
Domestic
13	Botola Pro	22
9	Moroccan Throne Cup	9
22	Aggregate	31
Continental
3	CAF Champions League	3
2	CAF Confederation Cup	0
2	CAF Super Cup	1
0	African Cup Winners' Cup (defunct)	1
1	CAF Cup (defunct)	0
1	Afro-Asian Club Championship (defunct)	1
9	Aggregate	6
Regional
2	Arab Club Champions Cup	1
0	Arab Super Cup (defunct)	1
0	Mohammed V Cup (defunct)	1
0	North African Championship (defunct)	3
0	North African Cup (defunct)	1
1	UNAF Club Cup	0
3	Aggregate	7
34	Total Aggregate	44

=== Head-to-head ranking (1957–2025) ===
P.	57	58	59	60	61	62	63	64	65	66	67	68	69	70	71	72	73	74	75	76	77	78	79	80	81	82	83	84	85	86	87	88	89	90	91	92	93	94	95	96	97	98	99	00	01	02	03	04	05	06	07	08	09	10	11	12	13	14	15	16	17	18	19	20	21	22	23	24	25	26
1	1									1			1							1	1	1								1		1		1	1		1			1	1	1	1	1	1			1		1			1	1	1		1		1		1		1	1	1	1		1		
2		2	2							2						2		2						2		2				2						2	2	2			2			2		2	2		2					2				2		2		2	2	2	2	2	2			
3				3			3				3	3		3			3		3	3			3		3		3	3								3				3		3				3	3		3			3			3	3					3								3	3
4		4	4	4							4										4				4				4			4						4					4					4		4	4		4			4	4													
5					5				5					5				5								5	5	5			5		5	5					5																					5							5	5	5	5
6						6	6	6																					6		6																											6				6								
7					7	7									7																														7							7																		
8												8										8																	8																				8											
9								9									9		9				9	9									9		9																																			
10	10															10																																																						
11															11																																				11																			
12									12																																																													
13													13																																																									
14																																																																						
15																																																																						
16																																																																						
17																																																																						
18																																																																						
19																																																																						
20																																																																						

- Total: Wydad with 39 higher finishes, Raja with 31 higher finishes (as of the end of the 2025–26 season).

== Records ==
=== Results ===
==== Biggest wins (3+ goals) ====
margin	Result	Date	Competition
4	Raja 5–1 Wydad	18 February 1996	Moroccan Throne Cup
3	Wydad 3–0 Raja	2 June 1957	Botola Pro
3	Wydad 0–3 Raja	11 February 1996	Botola Pro
3	Wydad 0–3 Raja	15 June 2003	Botola Pro
3	Raja 3–0 Wydad	8 May 2016	Botola Pro

==== Most goals in a match (5+ goals) ====
Goals	Result	Date	Competition
8	Wydad 4–4 Raja	23 November 2019	Arab Club Champions Cup
6	Raja 5–1 Wydad	18 February 1996	Throne Cup
5	Wydad 2–3 Raja	1977	Botola

=== Longest runs ===
==== Most consecutive wins ====
Games	Club	Period	League	Cup
4	Wydad	5 February 1989 – 5 May 1990	4	–
3	Raja	4 May 1980 – 1981	3	–
3	Raja	26 May 1984 – 12 May 1985	3	–
3	Raja	21 May 1995 – 18 February 1996	2	1
3	Wydad	29 September 2001 – 19 May 2002	2	1
3	Raja	9 July 2023 – 2 June 2024	2	1

==== Longest undefeated runs ====
Games	Club	Period	Wins	Draws	League	Cup
12	Raja	1973 – 1978	4	8	11	1
10	Wydad	1968 – 1972	3	7	10	–
8	Wydad	26 May 1996 – 13 December 1998	2	6	6	2

==== Longest undefeated runs in the league ====
Games	Club	Period	Wins	Draws
11	Raja	1973 – 1978	3	8
10	Wydad	1968 – 1972	3	7
10	Raja	3 November 1996 – 6 April 2001	2	8
8	Wydad	1963 – 1967	2	6
8	Raja	19 January 2003 – 24 May 2006	6	2
7	Raja	4 December 1982 – 12 November 1985	3	4
7	Wydad	4 December 2010 – 24 November 2013	2	5

=== Players ===
==== Top scorers ====
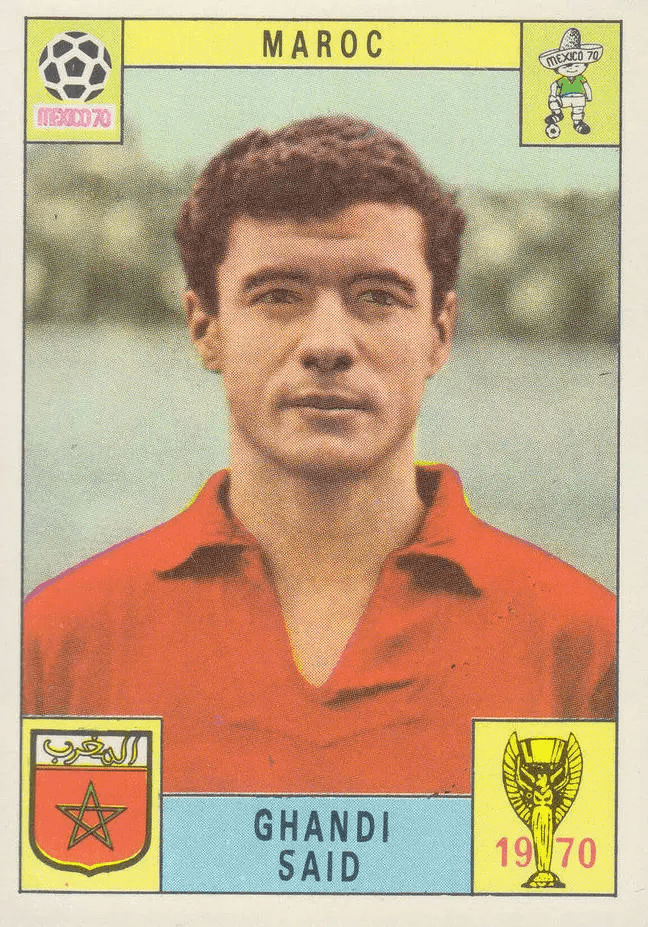
Said Ghandi is the all-time top scorer in the Derby history with 7 goals

Rank	Player	Club	League	Cup	Arab Cup	Total
1	(Morocco) Said Ghandi	Raja	6	1	–	7
2	(Morocco) Mouhcine Iajour	Wydad (3); Raja (3)	6	–	–	6
2	(Morocco) Mouhcine Moutouali	Raja	3	1	2	6
4	(Morocco) Moussa Hanoun	Raja	5	–	–	5
4	(Senegal) Moussa Ndao	Wydad	4	1	–	5
4	(Morocco) Mustapha Khalif	Raja	3	2	–	5
4	(Morocco) Rachid Daoudi	Wydad	4	1	–	5
4	(Morocco) Mustapha Bidoudane	Raja (3); Wydad (2)	3	2	–	5
10	(Morocco) Mohamed Lâarabi	Raja	3	1	–	4
10	(Morocco) Abdellatif Beggar	Raja (2); Wydad (2)	4	–	–	4
10	(Morocco) Mohammed Benchrifa	Wydad	3	1	–	4

==== Most player appearances ====
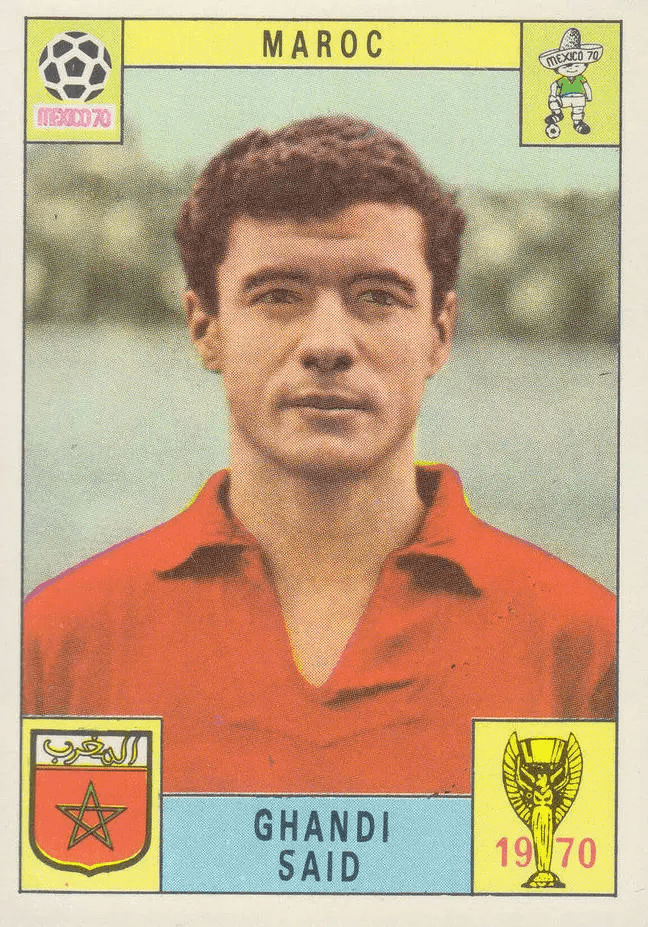
Said Ghandi has made the most appearances in the Derby, with 26

Rank	Player	Team(s)	Apps
1	(Morocco) Said Ghandi	Raja	26
2	(Morocco) Abdelmajid Dolmy	Raja	25
2	(Morocco) Abdellatif Jrindou	Raja	25
4	(Morocco) Larbi Khattabi	Wydad	22
4	(Morocco) Fakhreddine Rajhi	Wydad	22
6	(Morocco) Mohammed Jarir "Houmane"	Raja	21
6	(Morocco) Lahcen Abrami	Wydad	21
6	(Morocco) Anas Zniti	Raja	21
9	(Morocco) Abdelkader Ouaraghli	Wydad	20
9	(Morocco) Mohamed Oulhaj	Raja	20

== Personnel at both clubs ==
=== Players ===
The first players to move from Raja to Wydad and back were Abdulaziz Anini and Ezzeddine Abdel-Rafi in 1973.

Raja, then Wydad

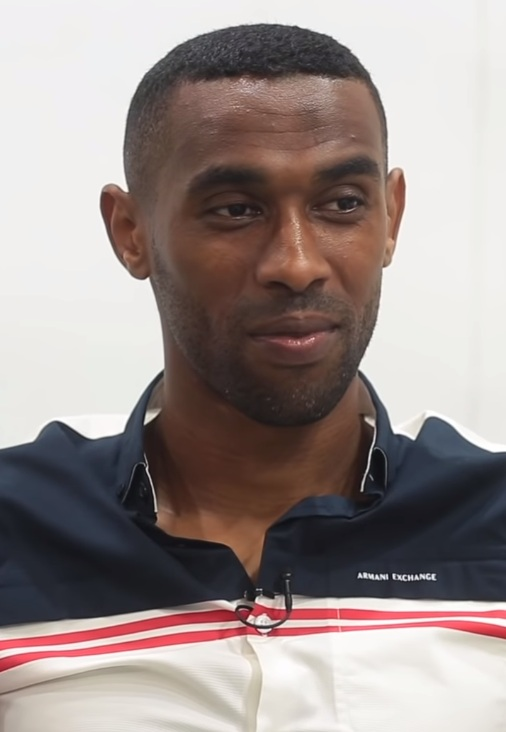
Mouhcine Iajour

Name	Position	Raja	Wydad
Name	Position	Career	Career
(Morocco) Mustapha Fahim "Milazzo"	DF	1956–67	1967–?
(Morocco) Ali Bendayan "Aliouate"	FW	1963–68; 1969–71	1968–69
(Morocco) Moussa Hanoun	FW	1953–63; 1964–66	1969–70
(Morocco) Azzeddine Abderrafi	MF	1968–73	1973–79
(Morocco) Mohamed Maaroufi	FW	1964–66	1973–74
(Morocco) Mustapha Choukri "Petchou"	MF	1966–75	1975–79
(Morocco) Aziz Kharbouch	GK	1979–80; 1983–88	1980–83
(Morocco) Mohamed Fennani	DF	1979–81	1981–?
(Morocco) Jawad El Andaloussi	DF	1972–77; 1983–85	1981–83
(Morocco) Jawad Chennaoui	FW	1977–83; 1985–86	1983–85
(Morocco) Abdellatif Beggar	MF	1974–84; 1979–83; 1986–87	1983–86
(Morocco) Nabil Okba	FW	1994–95; 1996–97	1998–2001
(Morocco) Adil Serraj	DF	1998–2002	2003–04
(Morocco) Zakaria Aboub	MF	1999–2002; 2009–10	2004–05
(Morocco) Mustapha Bidoudane	FW	2002–06	2007–10
(Morocco) Mouhssine Iajour	FW	2004–07; 2012–14; 2017–19	2010–12
(Morocco) Mohamed Armoumen	FW	2002–03; 2008–09	2010
(Morocco) Said Fettah	MF	2005–11; 2014–15	2011–14
(Morocco) Hicham El Amrani	DF	2006–09	2011–15
(Morocco) Omar Najdi	FW	2008–11	2012–14
(Morocco) Anas El Asbahi	MF	2011–12	2012–20
(Morocco) Yassine El Kordy	DF	2006–08	2014–17
(Morocco) Zakaria El Hachimi	DF	2012–17	2017–19
(Nigeria) Michael Babatunde	FW	2015–16	2018–21
(Morocco) Hamid Ahadad	FW	2019–20; 2021–22	2022–23
(Morocco) Jamal Harkass	DF	2021–23	2023–25
(Morocco) Mehdi Moubarik	MF	2023–24	2024–25
(Morocco) Walid Sabbar	MF	2014–18; 2022–23	2025–

Wydad, then Raja

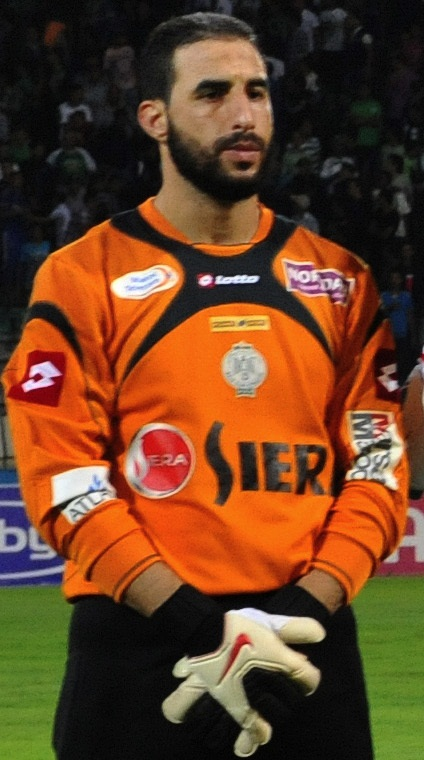
Tarik El Jarmouni

Name	Position	Wydad	Raja
Name	Position	Career	Career
(Morocco) Abdelkader Jalal	MF	1939–49	1949–54
(Morocco) Mohamed Naoui	FW	1940–44	1949–53
(Morocco) Abderrahmane Acila	FW	1952–55	1955–58
(Morocco) Mohamed Jdidi	DF	1954–57	1957–62; 1968–69
(Morocco) Mustapha Bettache	FW	1950–55	1963–66
(Morocco) Abdellah Azhar	FW	1956–57; 1967–68	1965–66
(Morocco) Mohamed Beggar	GK	?	1965–68
(Morocco) Abdelkader Bozambo	MF	?–1965	1965–69
(Morocco) Abdelaziz Anini	DF	?–1973	1973–74
(Morocco) Mohammed Sahraoui	MF	1957–71	1974–75
(Morocco) Faouzi Kadmiri	DF	1984–86; 1992–95	1987–92
(Morocco) Mohamed Sahil	MF	1980–84; 1986–87	1989
(Morocco) Mustapha Bark	MF	?	1989–91
(Morocco) Hassan Hirs	DF	1987–90	1990–92
(Morocco) Mustapha El Gherchi	DF	?–1992	1992–95
(Morocco) Khalil Azmi	GK	1984–92	1992–94
(Morocco) Khalid Fouhami	GK	1991–94	2006–08
(Morocco) Tarik El Jarmouni	GK	2000–02	2009–12
(Morocco) Youness Bellakhder	DF	2005–06; 2016–17	2009–11
(Morocco) Zakaria Ismaili	DF	2007–10	2010–11
(Morocco) Abdelhaq Ait Laarif	MF	2002–05; 2009–11	2011–12
(Morocco) Abdelmajid Eddine	FW	2001–02	2012–13
(Morocco) Jawad Issine	FW	2010–14	2014–15
(Republic of the Congo) Lys Mouithys	FW	2011–13	2014
(Morocco) Youssef Kaddioui	MF	2011–12	2015–17
(Morocco) Abdeladim Khadrouf	MF	2016–18	2018
(Morocco) Mohamed Nahiri	DF	2017–20	2021–23
(Morocco) Haitam El Bahja	DF	2019–21	2022–23
(Morocco) Ayoub El Amloud	DF	2019–24	2026–

=== Managers ===
Raja, then Wydad

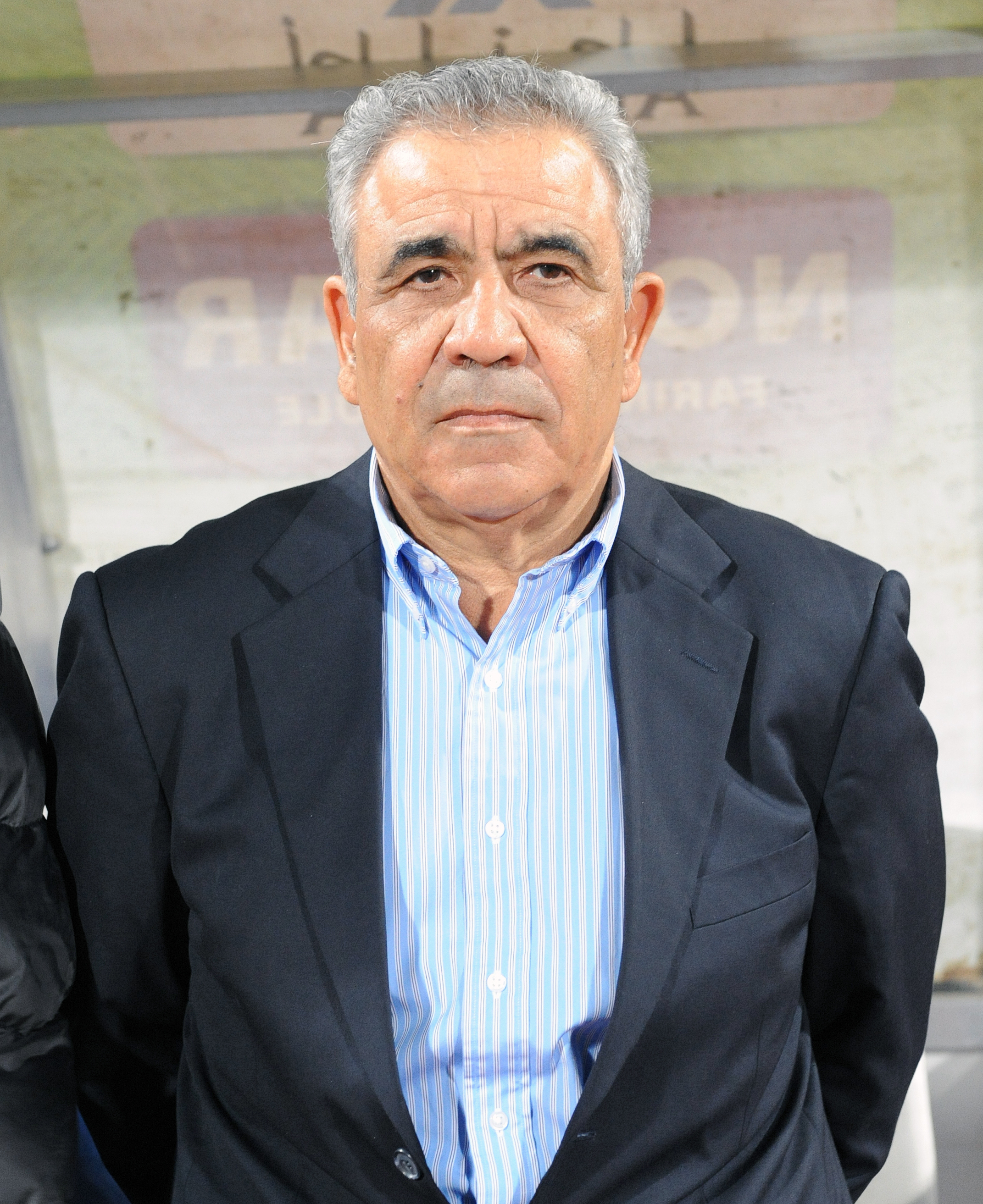
Faouzi Benzarti

Name	Raja	Wydad
Name	Career	Career
(Morocco) Abderrahman Mahjoub	1969–70	?
(Morocco) Abdelkader Lakhmiri	1955–56; 1970–71	1981–82
(Bulgaria) Dobromir Tashkov	1976–78	1983–84
(Romania) Alexandru Moldovan	1996–97; 2000–01; 2005	1997–98
(Argentina) Oscar Fulloné	1998–2000; 2005–06	2002–03; 2008
(Tunisia) Faouzi Benzarti	2013–14; 2022	2018–19; 2020–21; 2023–24
(Spain) Juan Carlos Garrido	2017–19	2020; 2023
(France) Patrice Carteron	2019	2026
(Tunisia) Nasreddine Nabi	2026	2026-

Wydad, then Raja

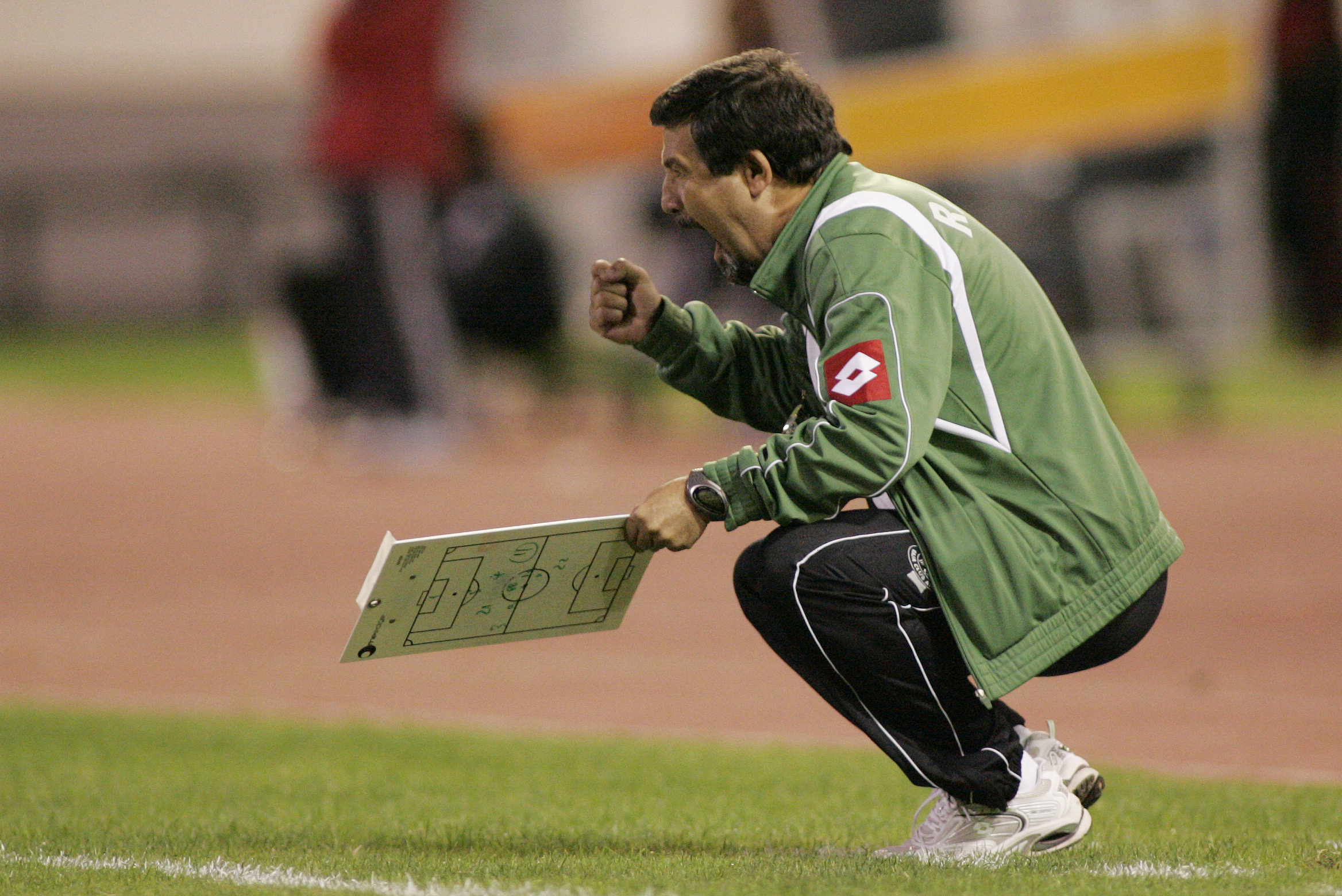
José Romão

Name	Wydad	Raja
Name	Career	Career
(Morocco) Père Jégo	1939–52; 1953–56	1956–68
(Morocco) Kacem Kacemi	1956	1956
(Morocco) Abdelhak El Kadmiri	1961–63; 1968–69	1967–68
(Morocco) Mustapha Bettache	1972–74; 1975–78	1981
(Ukraine) Yuriy Sevastyanenko	1989–94; 1999; 2000–01	2001
(Portugal) José Romão	2005–06	2008–09; 2009–10; 2014–15
(Morocco) Rachid Taoussi	2002	2015–16; 2022

== See also ==
- Moroccan Classico
