= List of Raja CA honours =

Raja Club Athletic (Arabic: نادي الرجاء الرياضي, romanized: Nādī ar-Rajāʾ ar-Riyāḍī) commonly referred to as Raja CA, is a professional sports club based in Casablanca, Morocco. Competing in Botola, Raja CA is one of only three clubs never to have been relegated from the top tier of Moroccan football.

In domestic football, the club has won 22 trophies that includes 13 Botola titles and 9 Throne Cups. It is also one of the most successful clubs in the history of African football as it has achieved twelve international trophies by winning the CAF Champions League three times, the CAF Confederation Cup twice, the CAF Super Cup twice, the CAF Cup once, the Afro–Asian Club Championship once, the Arab Club Champions Cup twice and the North African Club Cup once.

In 2000, Raja was ranked by CAF in the 3rd place of the best African clubs of the 20th century, after Al Ahly SC and Zamalek SC. Raja is also, with 19 official trophies, the most successful Moroccan club of the 21st century, and is the 4th most crowned club in Africa with 9 titles in official competitions.

This article contains historical and current trophies pertaining to the club throughout its history. For honours by season, see List of Raja CA seasons.

== List of honours ==
=== National titles ===
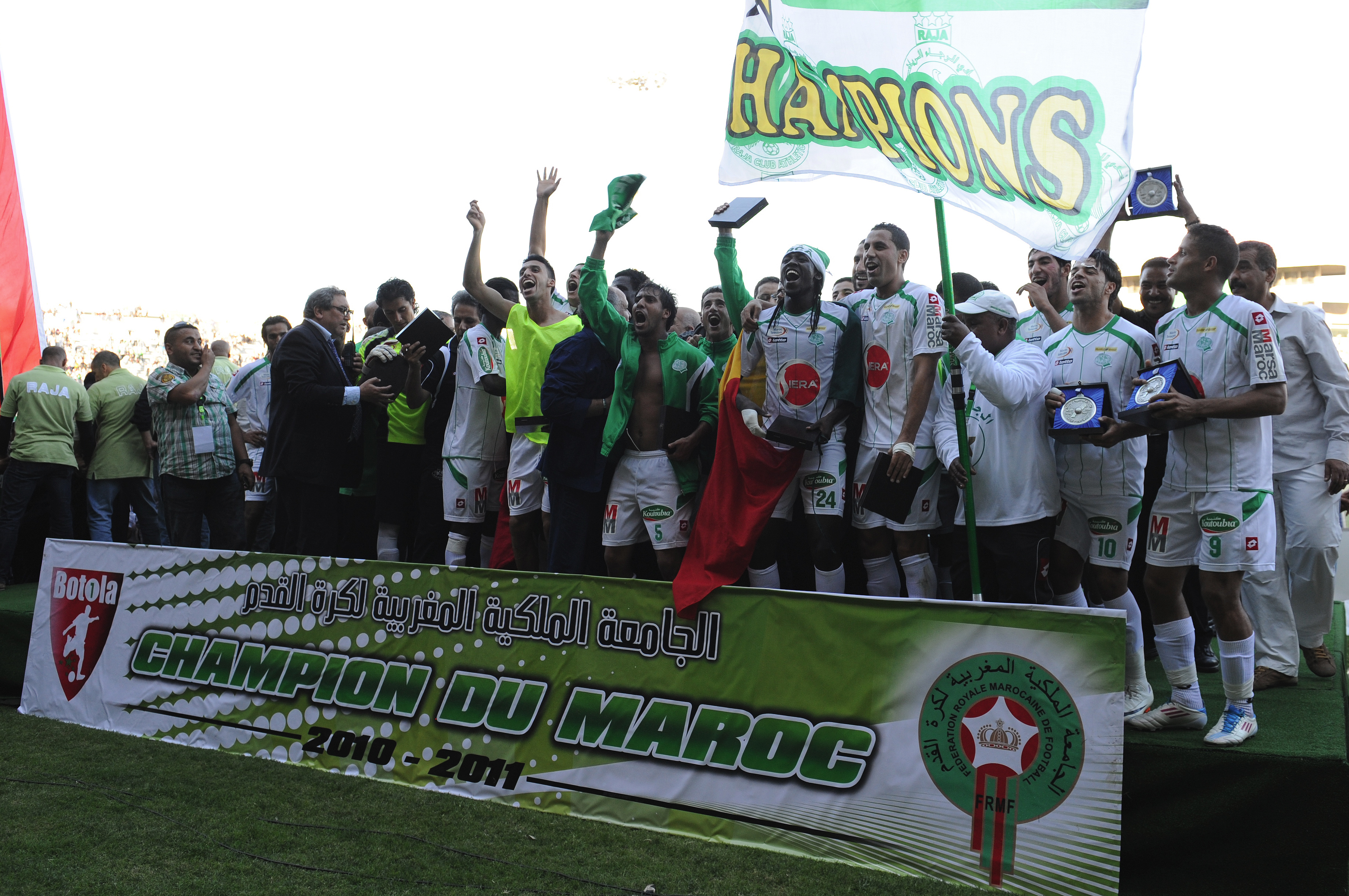
Raja CA players celebrating the club's tenth Botola title

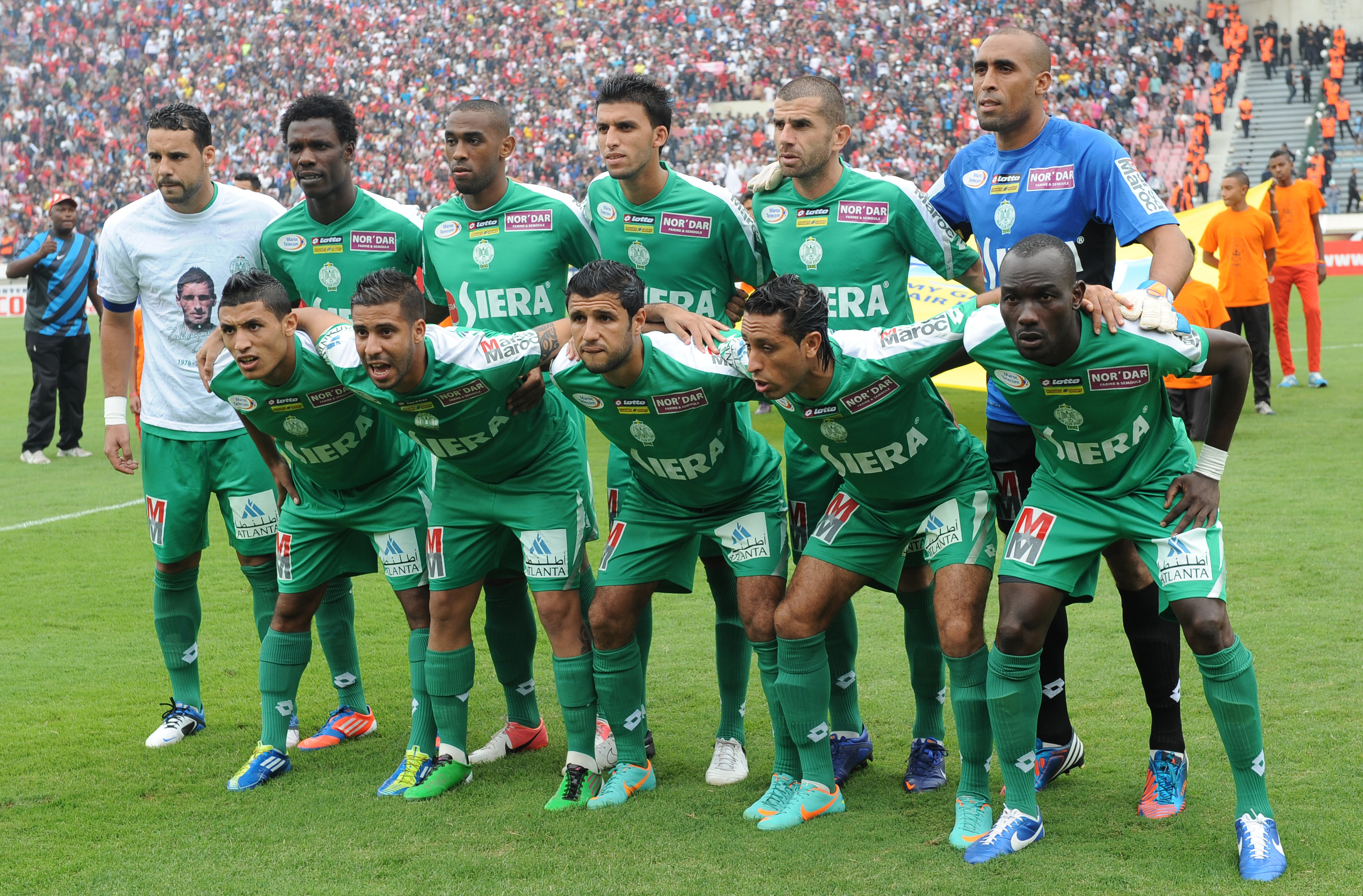
The squad that broke the club's all-time records of wins, goals and goal difference in Botola (2012–13 season)

Type	Competition	Honours	Seasons
National	Botola	Winners (13)	1987–88, 1995–96, 1996–97, 1997–98, 1998–99, 1999–2000, 2000–01, 2003–04, 2008–09, 2010–11, 2012–13, 2019–20, 2023–24
National	Botola	Runners–up (12)	1965–66, 1973–74, 1985–86, 1991–92, 1992–93, 2002–03, 2004–05, 2009–10, 2013–14, 2018–19, 2020–21, 2021–22
National	Throne Cup	Winners (9)	1973–74, 1976–77, 1981–82, 1995–96, 2001–02, 2004–05, 2012, 2017, 2023–24
National	Throne Cup	Runners–up (6)	1964–65, 1967–68, 1982–83, 1991–92, 2013, 2023

=== Continental and intercontinental titles ===
Type	Competition	Honours	Seasons
Continental	CAF Champions League	Winners (3)	1989, 1997, 1999
Continental	CAF Champions League	Runners–up (1)	2002
Continental	CAF Confederation Cup	Winners (2)	2018, 2020–21
Continental	CAF Super Cup	Winners (2)	2000, 2019
Continental	CAF Super Cup	Runners–up (2)	1998, 2021
Continental	CAF Cup	Winners (1)	2003
Intercontinental	Afro–Asian Club Championship	Winners (1)	1998

Competition	Honours	Runners up	Seasons
FIFA Club World Cup	Runners–up (1)	1	2013

=== Arab and regional titles ===
Type	Competition	Honours	Seasons
Continental	Arab Club Champions Cup	Winners (2)	2006, 2019–20
Continental	Arab Club Champions Cup	Runners–up (1)	1996
Continental	North African Club Cup	Winners (1)	2015

=== Friendly competitions ===
Type	Competition	Honours	Seasons
Friendly	Cherkaoui Tournament	1	1959
Friendly	Ben Bella Tournament	1	1962
Friendly	International Friendship Abha Cup	1	2004
Friendly	Arab Summer Cup	1	2007
Friendly	Ahmed Antifi Tournament	3	2004, 2009, 2016
