= Nabil Mesloub =

Moroccan football manager (born 1979)

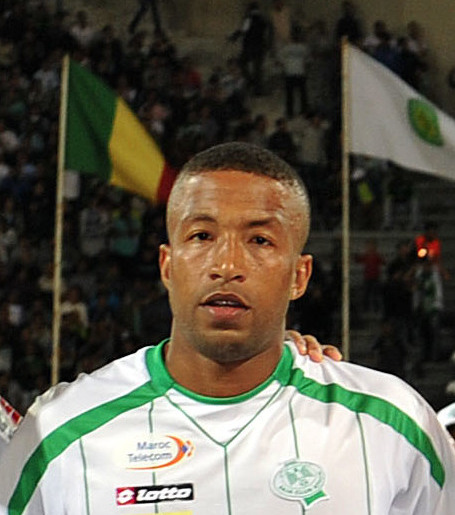
- Nabil Mesloub with Raja CA in 2011

Personal information
- Date of birth: 1 May 1979 (age 47)
- Place of birth: Casablanca, Morocco
- Height: 1.79 m (5 ft 10 in)
- Position: Midfielder

Youth career
- 1996–1999: Raja CA

Senior career*
| Years | Team | Apps | (Gls) |
| 1999–2007 | Raja CA | | |
| 2000–2001 | → AS FAR (loan) | | |
| 2007–2008 | DH El Jadida | | |
| 2008–2011 | Raja CA | | |

International career
| 2001–2002 | Morocco Olympic | 3 | (0) |
| 2002–2006 | Morocco | 5 | (0) |

Managerial career
- 2016–2022: Raja CA (U19)
- 2022–2023: Raja CA (U21)
- 2024–2025: Wydad Fès (assistant)
- * Club domestic league appearances and goals

Nabil Mesloub (Arabic: نبيل مسلوب, born 1 May 1979) is a Moroccan professional football manager and former player who played as a midfielder for Raja CA.

He joined Raja CA's youth academy at the age of 17 and was promoted to the first team in 1999, where he won two Botola titles, a Champions League and a CAF Super Cup. In 2000, he was loaned for one season to AS FAR, where he won the Throne Cup. After his return, he established himself in midfield and contributed to Raja's successes: the league title in 2004, two Throne Cups, a CAF Cup and an Arab Champions League. He played for DH El Jadida in 2007–08 and returned to Raja, where he won two more league titles, in 2009 and 2011.

After joining the Olympic team in 2001, he made his debut for the Atlas Lions against Costa Rica in March 2002. He was in the squad selected by Badou Zaki for the 2004 Africa Cup of Nations, but an injury sustained during the training camp ruled him out of the tournament.

== Club career ==
=== Beginnings and loan ===
Nabil Mesloub was born on 1 May 1979 in Casablanca. He grew up in Hay Mebrouka, Sidi Othmane, where he started playing football. In 1996, he joined the Oasis youth academy, under M'hamed Fakhir, who was then in charge of youth development at Raja CA. He started with the under-17s with Mohamed Nejmi, then moved on to the under-19s with Bouabid..

He was promoted to the first team by Oscar Fulloné during the 1998–99 season. On 9 May 1999, a few days after turning twenty, he made his debut against Chabab Mohammédia at El Bachir Stadium. The Greens won 1–0, thanks to a goal from Mustapha Moustawdae. Mesloub played in midfield as well as on the left wing. On 29 June 1999, Raja won their fourth consecutive league title after beating JS Massira (2–1).

On 12 December, Raja won the 1999 Champions League final against Espérance de Tunis, despite unfair refereeing, qualifying for the first edition of the Club World Cup. Raja exited the competition after three defeats, against Corinthians (0–2), Al Nassr (3–4) and Real Madrid (2–3). In the last match, Raja displayed a memorable performance but lost to late Geremi goal. They were praised by the sports press and acclaimed by the Brazilian crowd at the Morumbi Stadium.

On 6 March 2000, Raja won the CAF Super Cup against Africa Sports thanks to goals from Bouchaib El Moubarki and Mohamed Armoumen (2–0). On 21 June, after a 4–1 victory over JS Massira, the Eagles set a new record and won their fifth league title in a row.

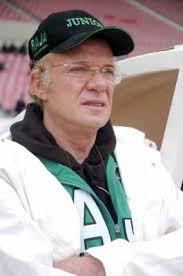
Oscar Fulloné Mesloub's first coach

Faced with tough competition in midfield from players such as Youssef Safri, Zakaria Aboub, Amin Erbate, Hicham Misbah and Hamid Nater, Masloub was loaned to AS FAR for the 2000–01 season, along with Mohamed Armoumen. On 4 March 2001, he started in the 1998–99 Throne Cup final, which AS FAR won against Chabab Mohammédia.

=== Confirmation and success ===
On his return in the summer of 2001, he was made a permanent fixture in midfield. On 23 December 2001, he scored his first goal in the green shirt against COD Meknès at the Stade Mohammed-V (4–1 win). He scored again against Stade Marocain the following week (1–3 win). On 14 April 2002, Mesloub scored his first continental goal against Étoile du Congo (3–0), in the round of 16 of the 2002 Champions League.

On 17 novembre 2002, Mesloub put in a memorable performance as the Greens kicked-out ASEC Abidjan ou of the Champions League semi-final in a historic match, overturning a 2–0 defeat with a 4–0 win. They thus reached the final, where they met Zamalek SC. After a goalless first leg against an Egyptian side that sat deep in defence, Raja lost in Cairo (0–1). At the end of the 2002–03 league season, the team finished runners-up, 2 points behind Hassania d'Agadir. On 23 novembre 2003 at the Stade Roumdé Adjia, Henri Michel's side won the CAF Cup against Cotonsport (0–0) during Ramadan, having won the first leg 2–0 thanks to goals from Bidoudane and Ali Diallo. On 11 January 2004, Raja won the Throne Cup against Maghreb AS (2–0).

On 20 June 2004, after a fiercely contested title race, the final matchday pitted Raja against Kénitra AC, and AS FAR against Kawkab Marrakech. By the hour mark, Raja is already leading 4–1 while AS FAR led 1–0. Youssef Kaddioui scored a second goal that seemed to have secured the title for AS FAR. But the Kawkabis hit back within a quarter of an hour, scoring the equalizer in the last minute to hand the title to Raja, a year after they had denied Raja the title by holding them to a draw in Casablanca (2–2).

On 5 December 2004, Mesloub scored his only goal in the Derby against Wydad AC. Trailing from the third minute, Raja equalised three minutes later thanks to a superb strike from around thirty metres. The match ended in a draw (1–1). On 16 July 2005 at the Moulay-Abdellah Stadium, Raja won its sixth Throne Cup, winning on penalties against Olympique Khouribga. On 6 mai 2006, Mesloub starts Raja beat ENPPI Club in the final of the Arab Champions League (3–1 on aggregate).

=== Transfer and return to Raja ===
In 2007, after a poor season for Raja, Nabil Mesloub played the 2007–08 season at Difaa Hassani El Jadidi. The team finished the league in fifth place. In 2008, he returned to his club under José Romão. After a hesitant start, Raja went on a 22-match unbeaten run that put them at the top of the league. On 9 October 2008, Mesloub scored the last goal of his career against JS Massira (5–0 win).

On 30 mai 2009, Raja travelled to Mohammédia needing only a draw to secure the title. They beat Chabab Mohammédia thanks to a goal from Omar Najdi, and won the Botola after five years. On 15 May 2010, the Greens travelled to face AS FAR on the final matchday needing only a win to claim the title. But their defeat handed the league title to Wydad.

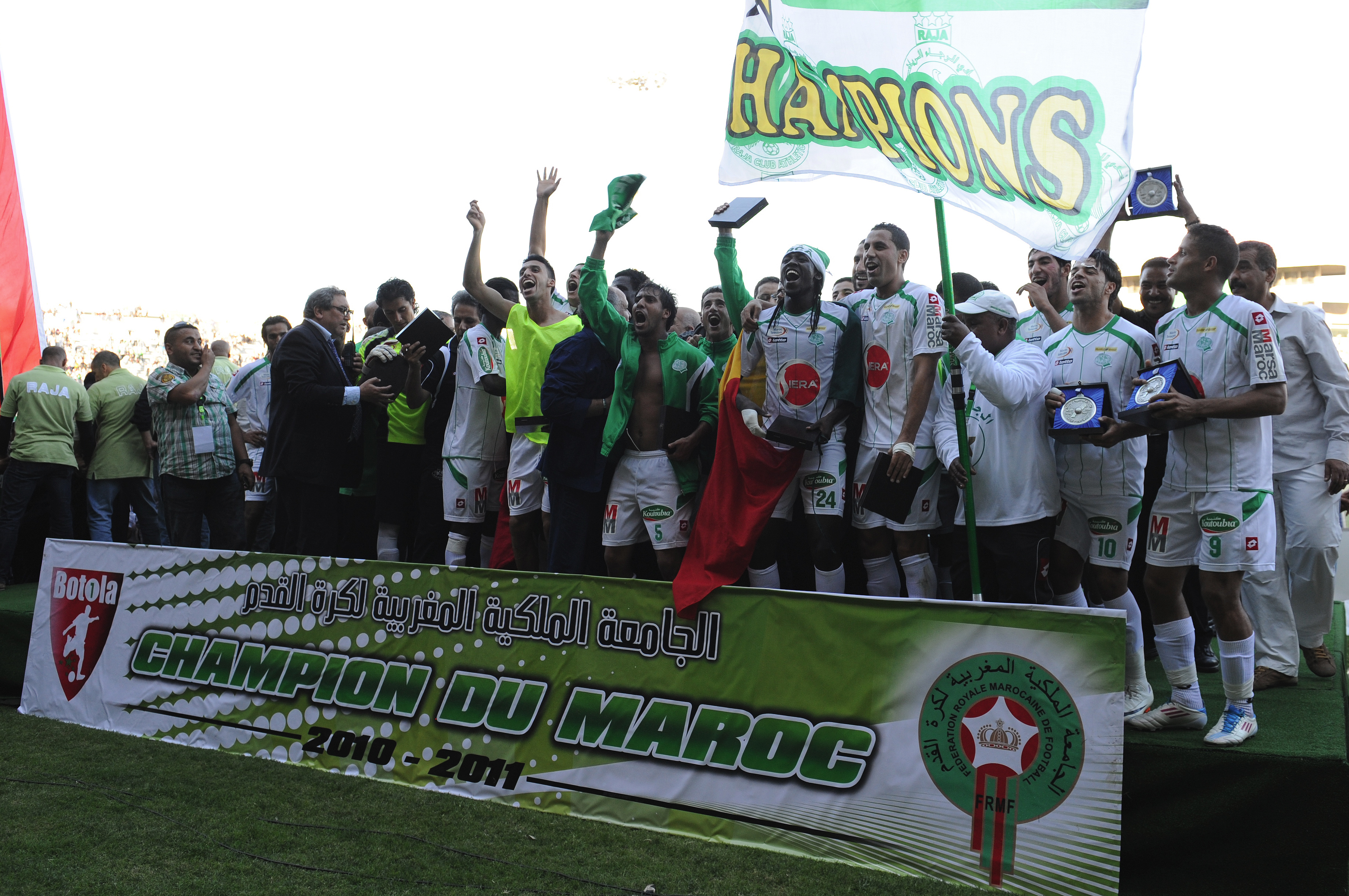
Mesloub and his teammates celebrating the league title in 2011

On 7 May 2011, he played the last match of his career against ASEC Mimosas, in the round of 16 of the 2011 Champions League. The tie was played as a single match in Casablanca because of the political instability in Abidjan. He played as a left-back and was replaced by Hicham Mahdoufi after an hour of play. On 21 May, Raja was crowned Moroccan champion after beating Olympique de Khouribga (2–1).

== International career ==
In 2001 and 2002, he was regularly called up by Badou Zaki to the Olympic team. On 24 July 2001, he's with the squad that beat France in 2001 Jeux de la Francophonie final (1–0).

On 27 March 2002 in San José, he earned his first cap for the Atlas Lions under Portuguese manager Humberto Coelho, in a 1–0 win over Costa Rica.

Selected by Badou Zaki for the 2004 Africa Cup of Nations in Tunisia, Mesloub had to withdraw because of an injury sustained during the national team's training camp in Marbella.

He was called up for the first gathering after the tournament and played against Switzerland on 18 February 2004 in Rabat (2–1 win). He then played three matches in 2006 under M'hamed Fakhir: on 23 May against the United States, then on 28 May against Mali. His last match took place on 4 June in Barcelona, where Morocco lost 2–0 to Colombia.

== Honours ==
Raja CA

- Botola: 1998–99, 1999–2000, 2003–04, 2008–09, 2010–11; runner-up: 2002–03, 2004–05, 2009–10
- Throne Cup: 2001–02, 2004–05
- CAF Champions League: 1999; runner-up: 2002
- CAF Cup: 2003
- CAF Super Cup: 2000
- Arab Club Champions Cup: 2006

AS FAR

- Throne Cup: 1998–99

Morocco

- Jeux de la Francophonie: 2001
