= List of Raja CA presidents =

Raja Club Athletic (Arabic: نادي الرجاء الرياضي, romanized: Nādī ar-Rajāʾ ar-Riyāḍī) commonly referred to as Raja CA, is a professional sports club based in Casablanca, Morocco.

This chronological list comprises all those who have managed the club since its foundation on 20 March 1949. Each president's entry includes his dates of tenure, the significant achievements accomplished under his care and some remarks concerning his spell.

Raja CA is owned and run by its members (in Arabic: المنخرطين) since its founding. They elect the president in a general assembly. The president has the responsibility for the overall management of the club, including formally signing contracts with players and staff. Abdellah Rhallam is the longest-serving president of the club (9 years, from 1992 to 1998 and from 2007 to 2010). He's also, tied with Ahmed Ammor, the most successful president (6 trophies).

== History ==
Raja CA has been led by a provisional commission instead of a president twice, the first was managed by Abdellah Rhallam in 2007, and the second by Mohamed Aouzal in 2018. The longest-serving president is Abdellah Rhallam (1992-1998, 2007–2010).

=== The founders (1949–60) ===
Elected on 20 March 1949, the Franco-Algerian Hajji Ben Abadji is the first president in the club's history, although he's not actually among the founders. Owner of a contract drafting office in Derb Sultan, he was suggested by his Algerian friend Rihani to circumvent the French law who prohibited, at the time of the Protectorate, the presidency of a sports club to a Moroccan citizen.

Meanwhile, Moulay Sassi Aboudarka Alaoui is designated honorary president. Ben Abadji remains the first and only non-Moroccan president. In its early years, Raja was managed by presidents who belonged to the founding assembly, such as Boujemaâ Kadri and Laâchfoubi El Bouazzaoui.

=== The unionists (1960–89) ===
During the 1960s and 1970s, some remarkable figures from the political and trade union sphere took over the club, such as Maâti Bouabid, Prime Minister of Morocco (1979-1983), Minister of Justice (1977-1981) and founder of the Constitutional Union, Abdellatif Semlali, Minister of Youth and Sports (1983-1992) or Abdelouhahed Maâch, Secretary-general of the Democratic Independence Party (1992-2016).

In 1959, the Istiqlal Party witnessed a historic split from the left-wing and progressive side led by Abderrahim Bouabid, Abdallah Ibrahim and Mehdi Ben Barka from the conservative and nationalist heart of the Party, led by Allal El Fassi and Ahmed Balafrej, giving birth to the National Union of Popular Forces. This new class had the support of a number of youth organizations, in particular the sports and worker youth of the Moroccan Workers' Union (UMT), at the time the only trade union center in Morocco.

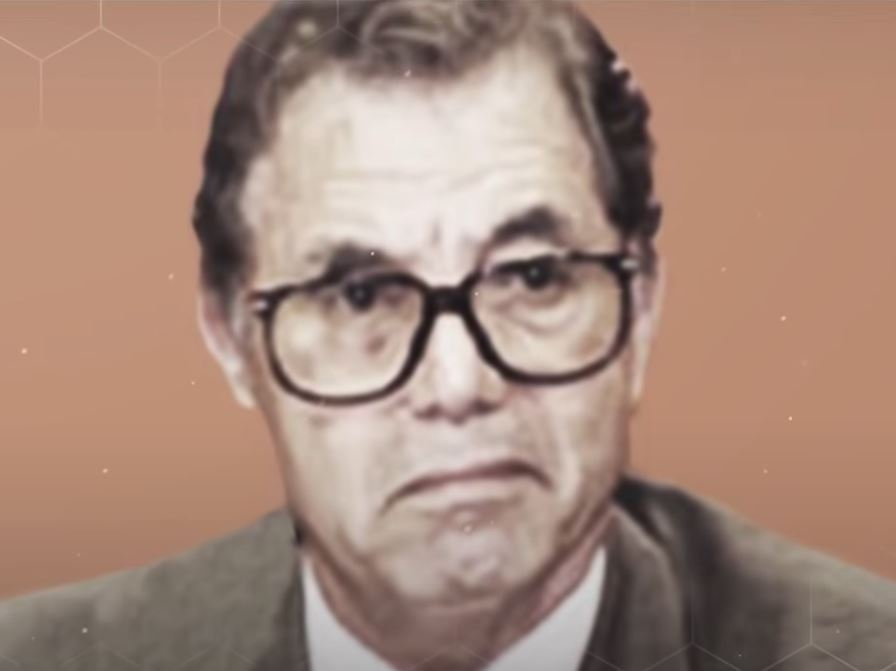
Maâti Bouabid, president from 1966 to 1968

In 1960, UMT became the main sponsor of Raja CA, which became in some way its representative on the football pitch and many members of the union played for the club. In 1974, the club's first title was celebrated with Mahjoub Ben Seddik, founder and historic leader of the Moroccan Workers' Union (UMT), by presenting the trophy to him in Ghbila prison, where he was being detained.

After a recomposition of the committee during the 1961 general assembly, several personalities who have greatly contributed to the club were awarded with honorary status :

- Abdallah Ibrahim
- Abderrahim Bouabid
- Maâti Bouabid
- Mahjoub Ben Seddik
- Driss Slaoui
- Ahmed Laski
- Mohamed Abderrazak
- Mohamed Ben Saleh
- Mohamed El Alami

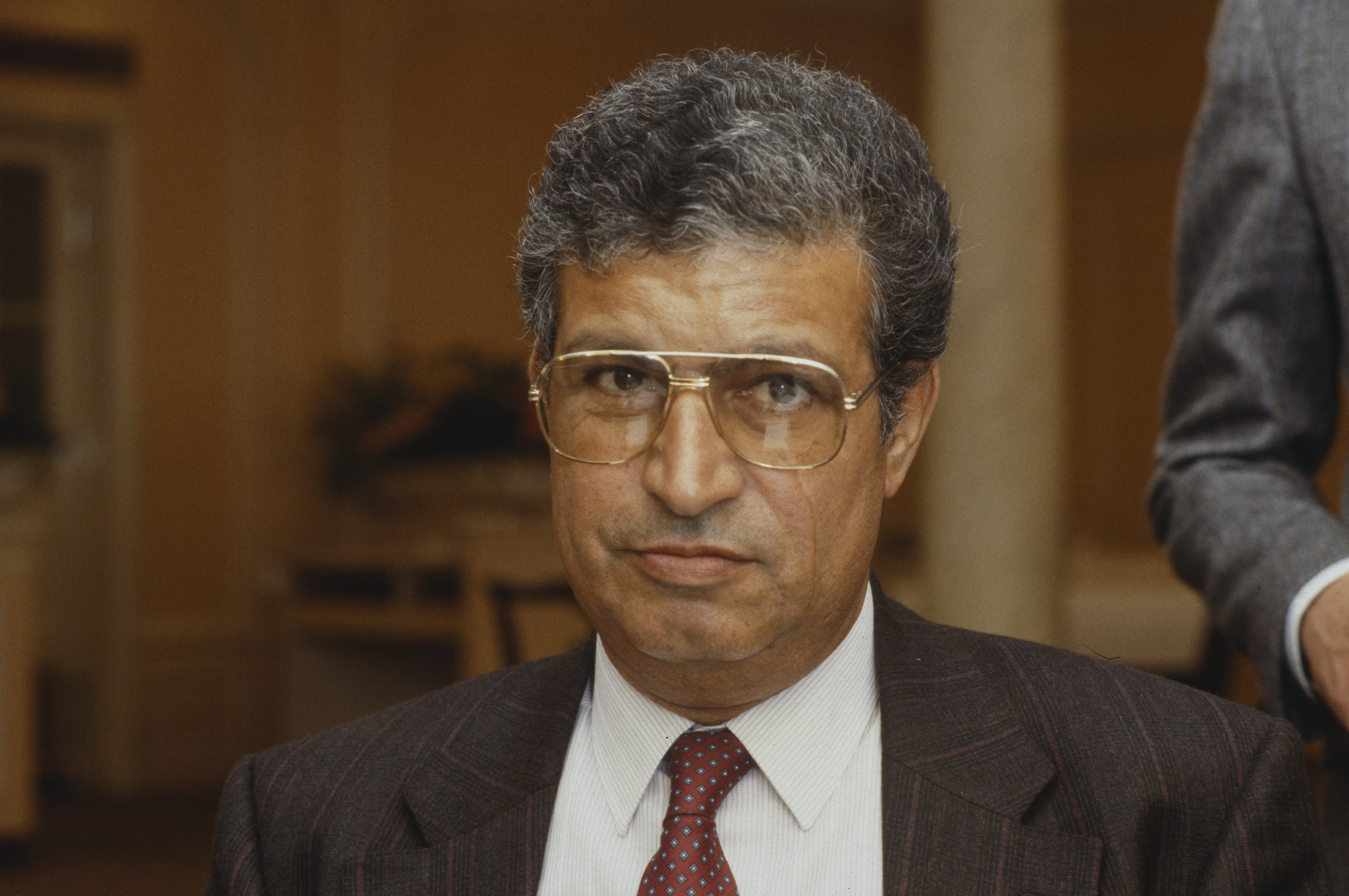
Abdellatif Semlali, president between 1978 and 1981

However, this unionist tendency did not prevent the integration of personalities belonging to other political currents such as Abdelouhahed Maâch, Abdellatif Semlali or Mohamed Abied who served as a treasurer of the club during the 1970s.

=== The « wise council » (1989–2012) ===
Between 1989 and 2012, five persons who are Abdelhamid Souiri, Mohamed Aouzal, Abdellah Rhallam, Ahmed Ammor and Abdesalam Hanat, take turns the presidency of Raja for 23 years (with the exception of Ahmed Ammor who performed only one spell). With Abdelkader Retnani, they formed the « wise council », an advisory committee at the disposal of the president. After the resignation of Abdesalam Hanat, Mohamed Boudrika was elected on June 7, 2012, at the head of the club, and became, at the age of 28, the youngest president of club's history. He arrived with large financial resources and promised a new era.

=== Modern era (2012–) ===
Coming to the end of his four-year term, Mohamed Boudrika was replaced in June 2016 by Said Hasbane who stated upon his arrival that the club was in financial crisis. On April 6, 2018, due to popular pressure from supporter and club members, Said Hasbane resigned from his position.

Former president Mohamed Aouzal set up a provisional committee to manage the club until the end of the season. On September 13, 2018, Jawad Ziyat is elected new president of Raja CA. He promises to continue the work of the previous committee, adding that he will do his best to get the club out of his financial crisis.

On November 15, 2020, Ziyat met his committee by video-conference to inform them of his decision to end his mandate. On December 14, 2020, Rachid Andaloussi succeeded him as an interim president. Unanimously elected in June 2022, Aziz El Badraoui resigns after one year due to poor results.

Elected in May 2023, Mohamed Boudrika is the current president of Raja Club Athletic. On 19 July 2024, Adil Hala succeeded him on an interim basis due to his absence, until the next general meeting. As the sole candidate with the same committee, he was elected by a majority on 12 September 2024, before resigning on 27 January 2025. Abdellah Biraouine succeeded him on interim.

On 7 July 2025, the Raja Parliament voted Jawad Ziyat as new club president after an eight-hour general assembly.

== President designation ==
It is the members who elect by vote, the president of the Raja Club Athletic at the end of the general assembly, whether it's ordinary or extraordinary.

The ordinary general meeting takes place every year and has as main objectives the discussion and approval of the moral and financial reports of the past season, and the election of a new president if the mandate of the outgoing one comes to an end or if the committee resigns. The extraordinary general assembly is held in case of emergency under the request of the majority of the members or of the president himself.

The club's internal law set no limit to the number of terms allowed for the president, and set the length of a term at four years. Since 1998, only Ahmed Ammor and Mohamed Boudrika have completed their four-year terms.

In the case of a resignation of the president, article 23 of chapter 4 of the club's law say that the first vice-president, if he expresses the will and if no candidate appears, will preside the club on interim until the next assembly.

=== Committee ===
Article 23 states: "In addition to the president, the management committee must contain between 9 and 15 members. Among them are elected: a first and a second vice-president, a general secretary and his assistant, a treasurer and his assistant and between 3 and 9 advisers.

The president have to constitute his committee and announcing it within a period which generally does not exceed fifteen days according to article 20 of the club's statutes. All club positions, including president, are honorary and without any financial compensation.

In 2020, Raja Club Athletic S.A. is created under the supervision of the Minister of Youth and Sports with a capital divided into 3000 shares. The Raja Club Athletic association is the majority shareholder of the S.A with 2984 shares, while a single share is granted as a loan to each member of the committee, then 16 in number. The shares do not belong to them, once a member leaves the committee, he must transfer his share to the association, that means that no one really owns the share.

== List of presidents ==
Below is the official presidential history of Raja CA, from Daoudi Ben maati until the present day.

President	Nationality	From	To	Honours	Observations	Notes
Daoudi Ben Maati	Morocco	20 March 1949	Novembre 1951	–	He was one of the founders of the Raja in 1949. Originally, the intention was to found the "Fath of Casablanca" in 1949, but the refusal of the club's name led them to propose the name "Raja" while maintaining the same structure. He fought for the club's official recognition until Hajji Ben Abadji assumed the presidency in 1951. He also served as the first Treasurer General of the FRMF in 1956, and was elected as a selector (notably for the Pan Arab Games in Beirut) and general supervisor. In 1959, he actively participated in the founding of the Workers' Federation, overseeing its development and structure, and served within it until his passing in December 1987.	
Hajji Ben Abadji	Algeria; France	Novembre 1951	June 1955	–	In March 1949, club founders wanted to keep the club independent from any colonial influence, because France, at the time of the protectorate, were prohibiting the club's presidency to a Moroccan citizen. The founders circumvent this law by leaving the chair to Ben Abadji, an Algerian living in Casablanca who had the French nationality. The French were forced to accept. He remains the first and only non-Moroccan president of the club. When the club was founded, its creators emphasized the need for it to remain free from colonial influence—especially given that French authorities prohibited a Moroccan citizen from serving as club president. They circumvented this regulation by nominally assigning the position to Ben Abadji, a Franco-Algerian, while the actual leadership role was held by Daoudi Ben Maati. It is highly likely that he was elected president in 1951.	
Maâti Bouabid	Morocco	June 1955	September 1956	–	On 6 June 1952, while serving as captain and vice-president, he became a lawyer and ended his football career. He was appointed sporting director in 1953. In 1955, at the age of 28, he was elected president.	
Boujemaâ Kadri	Morocco	September 1956	1958	–	He ensured the administrative organization of the club's creation. Under his presidency, Raja boycotted the triangular tournament decided by the FRMF at the end of the 1960 Botola. Raja, Kenitra AC and AS FAR finished tied in terms of points, but the title should have been given to Raja because they had the largest goal difference.	
Laâchfoubi El Bouazzaoui	Morocco	1958	1963	–	One of the founders, he took charge after having held the position of Vice President since the creation of the club.	
Karim Hajjaj	Morocco	1963	1966	–	He succeeds to El Bouazzaoui after serving as his vice president.	
Maâti Bouabid	Morocco	1966	1968	–	Futur Prime Minister of Morocco and one of the club most remarkable figures, he inspired those who followed him during the next three decades.	
Abdelkarim Benslimane	Morocco	1968	1969	–	He is the elected president with the shortest term.	
Abdelouhahed Maâch	Morocco	1969	1973		He founded and chaired the first supporters association in 1965. He was appointed deputy president in 1968 before being elected president.	
Mohamed Cherfaoui	Morocco	1973	1974	1973–74 Throne Cup	Under his presidency, Raja won their first title.	
Abdelouhahed Maâch	Morocco	1974	1978	1976–77 Throne Cup		
Abdellatif Semlali	Morocco	1978	1981	–	He was elected after serving as secretary-general for several years.	
Abdellah Firdaous	Morocco	1981	6 December 1984	1981–82 Throne Cup	He was dismissed by the committee.	
Houcine Sebbar	Morocco	6 December 1984	11 December 1984	–	He was chosen by members to manage the club on an interim basis until the next general assembly.	
Abdelkader Retnani	Morocco	11 December 1984	July 1989	1987–88 Botola	Vice-president of Cherfaoui, he revolutionized the management of the club. Under his presidency, Raja won its first championship and signed its first sponsorship deals.	
Abdelhamid Souiri	Morocco	July 1989	December 1989	–	He had held the position of secretary for monetary affairs since 1988. He was appointed interim president until the next general meeting.	
Mohamed Aouzal	Morocco	December 1989	June 1992	1989 African Cup of Champions	Upon his election, Raja won the African Cup of Champions. He resigned before the end of his term to chair the general committee in charge of all sections.	
Abdellah Rhallam	Morocco	June 1992	July 1998	1995–96 Botola; 1996–97 Botola; 1997–98 Botola; 1995–96 Throne Cup; 1997 Champions League	Under his presidency, Raja won their first Botola-Throne Cup double.	
Ahmed Ammor	Morocco	July 1998	10 July 2002	1998–99 Botola; 1999–2000 Botola; 2000–01 Botola; 1999 Champions League; 2000 Super Cup; 1998 Afro-Asian Championship	With only one term, he's the club's most successful president with 6 trophies (tied with Abdellah Ghallam). He was appointed Honorary President on November 25, 2002.	
Abdesalam Hanat	Morocco	10 July 2002	28 July 2003	–	Secretary-general since 1992, he was chosen unanimously to lead the club during an exceptional one-year term.	
Abdesalam Hanat	Morocco	28 July 2003	14 July 2004	2003–04 Botola; 2001–02 Throne Cup; 2003 CAF Cup	He was re-elected for a four-year term with 62 votes against 42 for Zakaria Semlali, son of former president Abdellatif Semlali. He resigned a year after for health reasons.	
Abdelhamid Souiri	Morocco	14 July 2004	11 January 2007	2005 Throne Cup; 2005–06 Arab Champions League	Vice president under Hanat, he was elected unanimously after the withdrawal of Zakaria Semlali. He established the first club legal committee of the league. He resigned before the end of his mandate.	
Abdellah Rhallam	Morocco	11 January 2007	12 July 2007	–	Head of the provisional commission in charge of managing the club until the next general assembly.	
Abdellah Rhallam	Morocco	12 July 2007	4 June 2010	2008–09 Botola	He was finally voted almost unanimously by the members. He's the longest-serving president. He's also the most successful president with 6 trophies tied with Ahmed Ammor. He retired without resigning.	
Abdesalam Hanat	Morocco	4 June 2010	10 May 2012	2010–11 Botola	He was re-elected for the second time. He resigned before the end of his mandate.	
Mohamed Boudrika	Morocco	7 June 2012	20 June 2016	2012 Throne Cup; 2012–13 Botola; 2015 UNAF Cup	He's the youngest president of the club's history, elected at 28 years and 9 months. His tenure was marked by a large number of transfers and the launch of the Raja Academy project. The team earned their second Botola-Throne Cup double and reached the World Cup final. First president to complete his quadrennial since Ahmed Ammor.	
Saïd Hasbane	Morocco	20 June 2016	6 April 2018	2017 Throne Cup	He announced upon his election that the club has to much dept. Inside an unprecedented financial crisis, he resigned under huge pressure from members and supporters.	
Mohamed Aouzal	Morocco	13 April 2018	13 September 2018	–	President of the provisional commission that managed the club until the general assembly.	
Jawad Ziyat	Morocco	13 September 2018	14 December 2020	2019–20 Botola; 2019 Super Cup; 2018 Confederation Cup	He significantly rectified the club's accounts, which posted its first positive net result since 2015. Under his presidency, the club switched to public limited company status, with the retention of the Raja CA association, the main shareholder with 2,984 shares. He resigned for personal reasons.	
Rachid Andaloussi	Morocco	14 December 2020	27 October 2021	2021 Confederation Cup; 2019–20 Arab Champions Cup	A member of Souiri's committee between 2004 and 2007 and vice-president under Jawad Ziyat, he served as interim president in accordance with chapter 4 of the club's statutes.	
Anis Mahfoud	Morocco	27 October 2021	16 June 2022	–	Secretary-general under Ziyat, he was elected by majority after winning the ballot with 95 votes, ahead of Jamaleddine Khalfaoui (44 votes) and Redouane Rami (17 votes). He announces his resignation on May 16, 2022, and convenes a GAa month later.	
Aziz El Badraoui	Morocco	16 June 2022	26 May 2023	–	Single candidate, he was voted unanimously and promised a “new era”. He resigned one year later.	
Mohamed Boudrika	Morocco	26 May 2023	19 July 2024	2023–24 Throne Cup; 2023–24 Botola	He wins the election against Said Hasbane with 117 votes against 45. After his arrest in Germany, his vice-president Adil Hala was tasked with ensuring the interim until the next assembly. The team won the first invincible double in the history of Moroccan football.	
Adil Hala	Morocco	19 July 2024	27 January 2025	–	He presented himself as the sole candidate with the same committee and was elected by majority. He resigned following his catastrophic sporting management.	
Abdellah Biraouine	Morocco	30 January 2025	7 July 2025	–	He was charged with the interim until the end of season.	
Jawad Ziyat	Morocco	7 July 2025	Incumbent	–	He passed the first round with 67 votes, against 40 for Abdellah Biraouine and 35 for Said Hasbane, then won the second round with 91 votes against 43 for Biraouine. The Raja Parliament also unanimously approved the activation of the club's sports company.	
