= Mustapha Moustawdae =

Moroccan footballer

Personal information
- Full name: Mustapha Moustawdae
- Date of birth: 28 September 1968 (age 58)
- Place of birth: Casablanca, Morocco
- Height: 1.73 m (5 ft 8 in)
- Positions: Attacking midfielder; winger

Youth career
- 1987-1988: Raja CA

Senior career*
| Years | Team | Apps | (Gls) |
| 1988-2000 | Raja CA | 322 | (86) |
| 2000-2002 | Emirates Club | | |
| 2002-2003 | Al Dhafra FC | | |

International career
| 1994–1996 | Morocco | 6 | (0) |
- * Club domestic league appearances and goals

Mustapha Moustawdae or Moustawdaa (Arabic: مصطفى مستودع; born 28 September 1968) is a Moroccan international footballer.

He spent most of his career playing for Moroccan club Raja CA. He helped the club win two champions leagues in three years in 1997 and 1999 and took part in the 2000 FIFA Club World Cup where he was one the team's best players. He's also the only Moroccan player to have won three Champions League titles, in 1989, 1997 and 1999.

== Honors ==
Raja CA

- Botola: 1995–96, 1996–97, 1997–98, 1998–99; runner-up: 1991–92
- Coupe du Trône: 1996; runner-up: 1992
- CAF Champions League: 1997, 1999
- CAF Super Cup: 2000; runner-up: 1998
- Afro-Asian Cup: 1998
- Arab Club Champions Cup: runner-up: 1996
