= Abdelilah Fahmi =

Moroccan footballer

Personal information
- Full name: Abdelilah Fahmi
- Date of birth: 3 August 1973 (age 53)
- Place of birth: Casablanca, Morocco
- Height: 1.87 m (6 ft 1 1/2 in)
- Position: Defender

Senior career*
Years	Team	Apps	(Gls)
1991–1999	Raja Casablanca		
1999–2003	Lille	88	(3)
2003–2005	Strasbourg	26	(2)
2005–2006	Gaziantepspor	11	(1)
2006	Al-Khor		
2006	Al-Arabi		
2007–2009	Raja Casablanca		

International career^{‡}
1995–2005	Morocco	17	(2)
- * Club domestic league appearances and goals as of 9 September 2015 ‡ National team caps and goals as of 9 September 2015

Abdelilah Fahmi (Arabic: عبدالإله فهمي; born 3 August 1973) is a Moroccan former footballer who played as a defender.

Fahmi appeared in 11 Turkish Super Lig matches for Gaziantepspor during the 2005–06 season.

He was part of the Moroccan 2000 African Nations Cup team, which finished third in group D in the first round of competition, thus failing to secure qualification for the quarter-finals.

== Career statistics ==
=== International ===
Morocco
Year	Apps	Goals
1995	1	1
1996	2	1
1997	1	0
1998	0	0
1999	1	0
2000	1	0
2001	2	0
2002	5	0
2003	1	0
2004	2	0
2005	1	0
Total	11	7

== Honours ==
Raja CA

- Botola: 1995–96, 1996–97, 1997–98, 1998–99; runner-up: 1991–92
- Coupe du Trône: 1996
- CAF Champions League: 1997, 1999
- Afro-Asian Cup: 1998
- CAF Super Cup runner-up: 1998
- Arab Club Champions Cup: runner-up: 1996

LOSC Lille

- Ligue 2: 1999–2000
- UEFA Intertoto Cup runners-up: 2002

RC Strasbourg

- Coupe de la Ligue: 2004–05
