= Mustapha Khalif =

Moroccan footballer

Personal information
- Date of birth: 10 October 1964 (age 62)
- Place of birth: Casablanca, Morocco
- Height: 1.78 m (5 ft 10 in)
- Position: Midfielder

Youth career
- 1982-1983: Fath Sbata
- 1982-1985: Hassania Sbata
- 1985-1988: Raja CA

Senior career*
| Years | Team | Apps | (Gls) |
| 1988-1999 | Raja CA | | |
| 1999-2000 | Emirates Club | | |

International career
| 1993–1998 | Morocco | 21 | (1) |
- * Club domestic league appearances and goals

Mustapha Khalif (born 10 October 1964) is a Moroccan footballer. He played in 21 matches for the Morocco national football team from 1993 to 1998. He was also named in Morocco's squad for the 1998 African Cup of Nations tournament.

== Honours ==
Raja CA

- Botola: 1987–88, 1995–96, 1996–97, 1997–98, 1998–99; runner-up: 1991–92
- Coupe du Trône: 1996; runner-up: 1992
- CAF Champions League: 1989, 1997, 1999
- Afro-Asian Cup: 1998
- CAF Super Cup runner-up: 1998
- Arab Club Champions Cup: runner-up: 1996
