= Tarik El Jarmouni =

Moroccan footballer

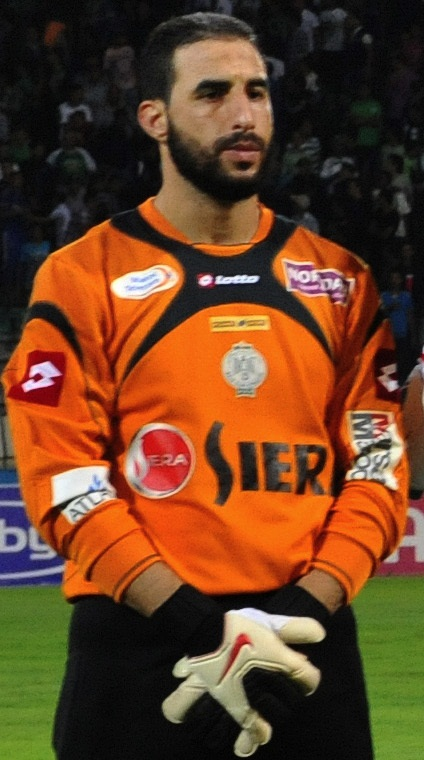

Personal information
- Date of birth: 30 December 1977 (age 48)
- Place of birth: Mohammedia, Morocco
- Height: 1.92 m (6 ft 4 in)
- Position: Goalkeeper

Youth career
- ?–1996: Chabab Mohammédia

Senior career*
Years	Team	Apps	(Gls)
1996–2000	Chabab Mohammédia		
2000–2002	Wydad Casablanca		
2003	Dynamo-2 Kyiv	1	(0)
2003–2010	AS FAR		
2006	→ Zamalek SC (loan)		
2010–2012	Raja CA	13	(0)
2013–2014	Chabab Mohammédia		

International career
1999–2009	Morocco	17	(0)
- * Club domestic league appearances and goals

Tarik El Jarmouni (born 30 December 1977), sometime spelled as Tarek Jermouni is a Moroccan football coach and former professional player who is the goalkeeping coach at Botola club Chabab Mohammédia.

As a player he was a goalkeeper in a career from 1996 to 2014. Having come through the youth ranks of his hometown club Chabab Mohammédia he went on to notably play for Wydad Casablanca, AS FAR and Raja Casablanca. He also featured for Dynamo-2 Kyiv and Zamalek.

El Jarmouni retired in 2014 after a season with Chabab Mohammédia in the Amateur Championship.

El Jarmouni played for Morocco at the 2000 Summer Olympics in Sydney.

== Club career ==
=== Dynamo-2 Kyiv ===
In January 2003, Dynamo Kyiv acquired El Jarmouni from Wydad Casablanca. As soon as he joined his new team, he was immediately sent to the second team. However, he lost the competition for a place in the goal to Rustam Khudzhamov, so he played only one match for the third team in six month.

=== AS FAR ===
In the end of the 2002–03 season, El Jarmouni terminated his contract with Dynamo Kyiv and joined AS FAR for a reported fee of $25,000.

== Personal life ==
El Jarmouni is a practicing Muslim. In December 2007, he performed Hajj pilgrimage to Mecca.

== Honours ==
Chabab Mohammédia

- Moroccan Throne Cup runner-up: 1999

Wydad Casablanca

- Botola runner-up: 2001-02
- Moroccan Throne Cup: 2001
- CAF Super Cup runner-up: 2003
- African Cup Winners' Cup: 2002

AS FAR

- Botola: 2004-05, 2007-08; runner-up: 2003-04, 2005-06, 2006-07
- Moroccan Throne Cup: 2004, 2007, 2008, 2009
- CAF Confederation Cup: 2005; runner-up: 2006
- CAF Super Cup runner-up: 2006
- North African Cup of Champions runner-up: 2008
- Ahmed Antifit Tournament: 2007; runner-up: 2009

Raja Casablanca

- Botola: 2010-11

Morocco U-20

- U-20 Africa Cup of Nations: 1997

Morocco

- African Cup of Nations: 2004
