= Mohamed Madihi =

Moroccan footballer

Personal information
- Date of birth: 15 February 1979 (age 47)
- Place of birth: Morocco
- Height: 1.70 m (5 ft 7 in)
- Position: Forward

Senior career*
Years	Team	Apps	(Gls)
–2001	Raja Beni Mellal		
2001–2006	Wydad Casablanca		
2006	Al-Qadisiya		
2007	Wydad Casablanca	9	(2)
2008	Moghreb Tétouan		
2009–2011	FAR Rabat		
2012–2013	IR Tanger		

International career
2002–2008	Morocco	26	(4)
- * Club domestic league appearances and goals

Mohamed Madihi (born 15 February 1979) is a Moroccan professional football manager and former player.

== Career ==
At the end of the 2004–05 Botola, Madihi left Wydad Casablanca to pursue a contract with Emirati side Al Dhafra FC. However, he failed to receive an international clearance and returned to Wydad shortly after the 2005–06 Botola started.

Madihi joined FAR from Moghreb Tétouan in January 2009.

After he retired from playing football, Madihi became a coach. Madihi was manager of Maghreb de Fès until October 2018. He was appointed manager of struggling Botola newcomers Raja Beni Mellal late in the 2019–20 season, but was not able to avoid relegation.
