= Hicham Louissi =

Moroccan footballer (born 1976)

Personal information
- Date of birth: January 19, 1976 (age 50)
- Place of birth: Sidi Bernoussi, Morocco
- Height: 1.74 m (5 ft 9 in)
- Position: Defender

Senior career*
Years	Team	Apps	(Gls)
1999–2000	Rachad Bernoussi		
2000–2001	Al-Nasr		
2001–2012	Wydad Casablanca		
2012–2013	Rachad Bernoussi		

International career
2006	Morocco		
- * Club domestic league appearances and goals

Hicham Louissi (born January 19, 1976, in Morocco) is a former Moroccan footballer who spent most of his career playing for Wydad Casablanca.

== Career ==
Born in the Sidi Bernoussi neighborhood of Casablanca, Louissi played youth football for local Club Rachad Bernoussi. After graduating and joining the club's senior side, Louissi began playing professional football with Kuwaiti side Al-Nasr SC (Kuwait) in 1999. He played one season in Kuwait, and then returned to Morocco where he joined Wydad Casablanca.

Louissi was a key defender for Wydad, helping the club win the Moroccan Throne Cup and the 2002 African Cup Winners' Cup. He also scored a crucial goal as Wydad won the 2005–06 Botola, the club's first championship in fourteen years.
