= Yassine Salhi =

Yassine Salhi may refer to:

- Yassin Salhi (1980-2015), French criminal
- Yassine Salhi (footballer, born 1987), Moroccan football forward
- Yassine Sahli (born 1987), Tunisian football defender
- Yassine Salhi (footballer, born 1989), Tunisian football midfielder
