= Yassine Sahli =

Tunisian footballer

Personal information
- Date of birth: 23 November 1987 (age 38)
- Position: Defender

Senior career*
Years	Team	Apps	(Gls)
2011–2016	CA Bizertin		
2015–2016	→ ES Zarzis (loan)		
2016–2017	ES Métlaoui		
2017–2020	JS Kairouan		
- * Club domestic league appearances and goals

Yassine Sahli (born 23 November 1987) is a retired Tunisian football defender.
