= Fadel Jilal =

Moroccan footballer

Personal information
- Date of birth: 4 March 1964 (age 62)
- Place of birth: Morocco
- Height: 1.90 m (6 ft 3 in)
- Position: Midfielder

Senior career*
Years	Team	Apps	(Gls)
1982–1998	Wydad Casablanca		

International career
- Morocco
- * Club domestic league appearances and goals

Fadel Jilal (born 4 March 1964) is a Moroccan football midfielder who played for Morocco in the 1986 FIFA World Cup. He also played for Wydad Casablanca.
