= 2006–07 Botola =

Moroccan football league season

Botola
- Season: 2006–07
- Champions: Olympique Khouribga (1st title)
- Relegated: IR Tanger; AS Salé

The 2006–07 season of the GNF 1 first division of Moroccan football.

== Teams ==
- AS Salé
- FAR Rabat
- Difaa El Jadida
- CODM Meknès
- IR Tanger
- IZK Khemisset
- Hassania Agadir
- Jeunesse Massira
- Maghreb Fez
- Mouloudia Oujda
- Kawkab Marrakech
- Moghreb Athletic Tétouan
- OC Khouribga
- Olympique Safi
- Wydad Casablanca
- Raja de Casablanca

== Final league table ==
Pos	Team	Pld	W	D	L	GF	GA	GD	Pts	Qualification or relegation (Note: Rachad Bernoussi qualified for the 2008 CAF Confederation Cup as the 2007 Coupe du Trône runner-up.)
1	Olympique Khouribga	30	17	11	2	38	16	+22	62	2008 CAF Champions League
2	FAR Rabat	30	16	7	7	31	17	+14	55	2008 CAF Champions League
3	Moghreb Athletic Tétouan	30	15	9	6	37	31	+6	54	2007–08 Arab Champions League
4	Wydad Casablanca	30	11	14	5	30	20	+10	47	2007–08 Arab Champions League
5	Difaa El Jadida	30	9	15	6	29	19	+10	42	
6	Kawkab Marrakech	30	10	12	8	23	17	+6	42	
7	IZK Khemisset	30	10	12	8	24	23	+1	42	
8	Jeunesse Massira	30	8	13	9	21	21	0	37	
9	Hassania Agadir	30	8	12	10	22	23	−1	36	
10	Mouloudia Oujda	30	8	12	10	25	35	−10	36	
11	Raja CA	30	7	14	9	23	20	+3	35	2007–08 Arab Champions League
12	Olympique Safi	30	7	11	12	22	31	−9	32	
13	CODM Meknès	30	6	13	11	17	24	−7	31	
14	Maghreb Fez	30	7	8	15	19	34	−15	29	
15	IR Tanger	30	5	12	13	21	30	−9	27	Relegation to GNF 2
16	AS Salé	30	3	11	16	21	42	−21	20	Relegation to GNF 2

Source: rsssf.com
Notes:

Moroccan GNF 1 2006-07 winners
Olympique Khouribga
1st title
