= Moussa N'Daw =

Senegalese footballer

Personal information
- Date of birth: 15 July 1968 (age 58)
- Place of birth: Thiès, Senegal
- Height: 1.79 m (5 ft 10 in)
- Position: Striker

Senior career*
Years	Team	Apps	(Gls)
–1988	ASC Jeanne d'Arc		
1988–1989	Le Touquet	3	(0)
1989–1992	Wydad Casablanca		(62)
1992–1994	Al-Hilal		
1994–1995	Farense	9	(3)
1999–2000	Al-Riyadh		(1)

International career
1995	Senegal	6	(2)

Managerial career
- ASC Jeanne d'Arc
- * Club domestic league appearances and goals

Moussa N'Daw (born on 15 July 1968) is a Senegalese former professional footballer who played as a striker. He made his career in the Moroccan league, in Wydad Casablanca during 1991 to 1992 and in the Saudi Professional League during 1992 to 1994 with Al-Hilal and 1999 to 2000 with Al-Ettifaq. He is now a coach in Senegal with Jeanne d'Arc in Dakar.
