= Fakhreddine Rajhi =

Moroccan footballer

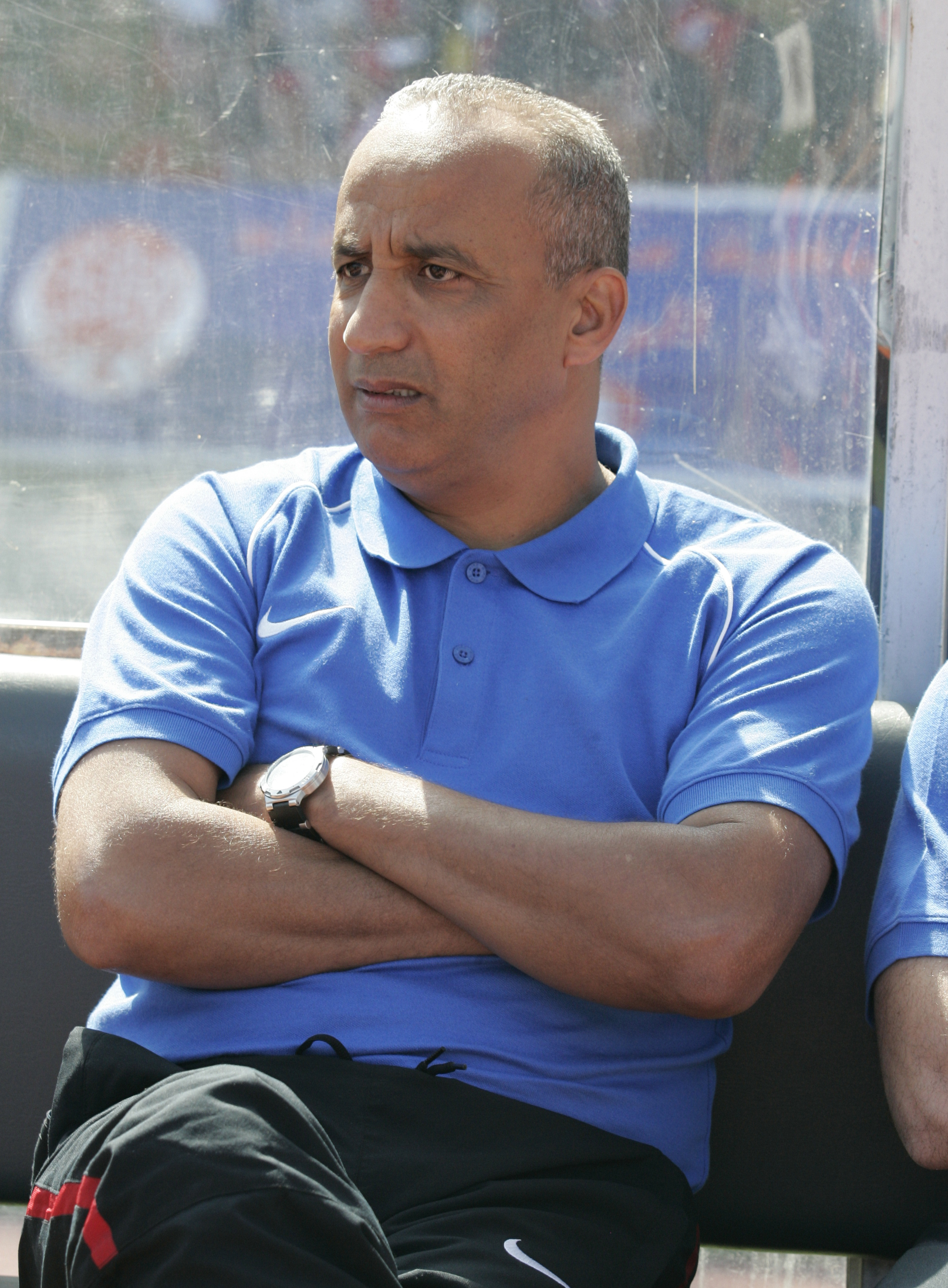

Personal information
- Date of birth: 19 November 1959 (age 66)
- Place of birth: Marrakesh, Morocco

Senior career*
Years	Team	Apps	(Gls)
1981–1995	Wydad AC	+200	(+70)

International career
1985–1992	Morocco	13	(1)
- * Club domestic league appearances and goals

Fakhreddine Rajhi (born 19 November 1959) is a Moroccan footballer. He played for the Morocco national football team from 1985 to 1992. He was also named in Morocco's squad for the 1992 African Cup of Nations tournament.
