= Abdelhaq Ait Laarif =

Moroccan footballer

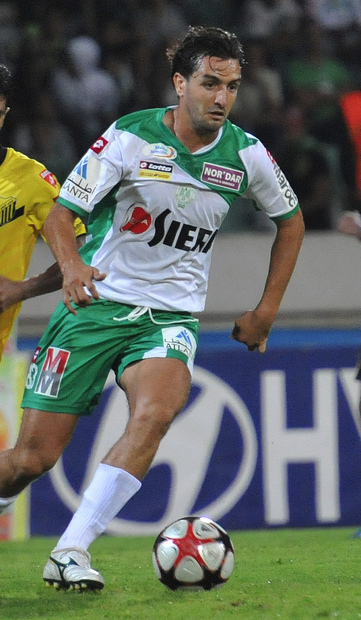

Personal information
- Full name: Abdelhaq Ait Laarif
- Date of birth: 1 October 1983 (age 43)
- Place of birth: Casablanca, Morocco
- Height: 1.81 m (5 ft 11 1/2 in)
- Position: Midfielder

Youth career
- ?–2001: Wydad Casablanca

Senior career*
Years	Team	Apps	(Gls)
2001–2005	Wydad Casablanca	91	(32)
2005	CS Sfaxien		
2006	Al-Ahli Saudi FC		
2006–2008	Al Gharrafa		
2008–2009	Ajman Club		
2009–2011	Wydad Casablanca		
2011–2012	Raja CA		
2012–2013	Wydad de Fès		
- * Club domestic league appearances and goals as of April 16, 2009 ‡ National team caps and goals as of October 17, 2008

Abdelhaq Ait Laarif is a Moroccan footballer. He usually plays as midfielder. Ait Laarif played for clubs including Wydad Casablanca. He returned to Wydad in June 2009, after four seasons playing in Tunisia, Saudi Arabia, Qatar, and the United Arab Emirates.

Ait Laarif played for Wydad as the club lost the 2004 Coupe du Trône final to FAR Rabat.
