= 1964–65 Moroccan Division Nationale I =

Moroccan football league season

Division Nationale I
- Season: 1964–65
- Champions: MAS Fez (1st title)
- Top goalscorer: Abdelfettah Filali (20 goals)

The 1964–65 Division Nationale I is the 9th season of the Moroccan Premier League. MAS Fez are the holders of the title.
