= Khalid Sekkat =

Moroccan footballer

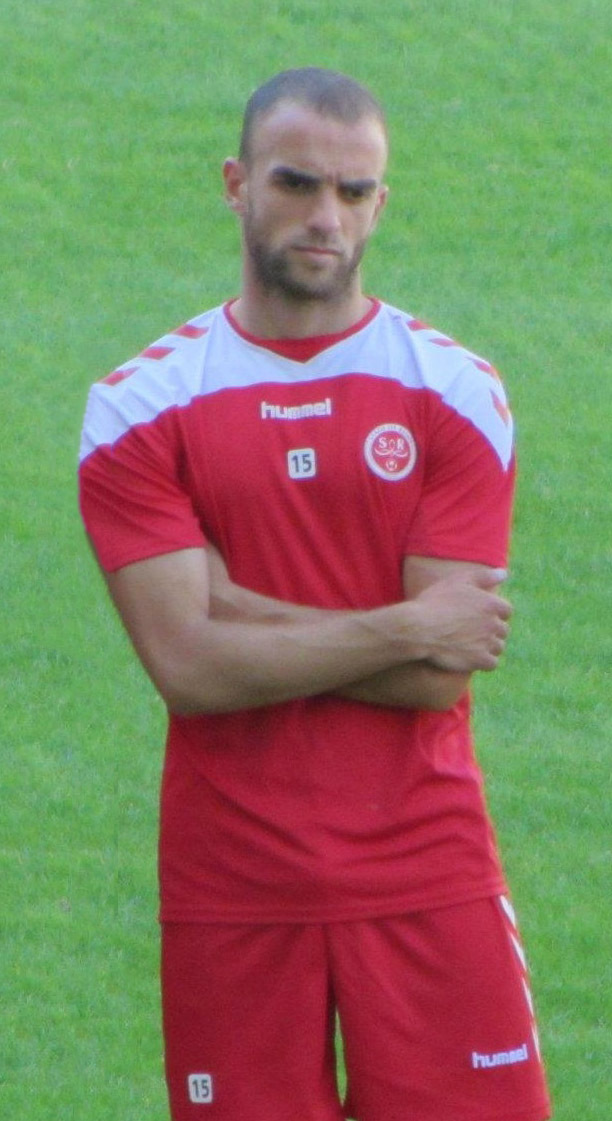

Personal information
- Full name: Khalid Sekkat
- Date of birth: May 12, 1984 (age 42)
- Place of birth: Fes, Morocco
- Height: 1.80 m (5 ft 11 in)
- Position: Left back

Team information
- Current team: Wydad Casablanca

Youth career
- 2001–2004: Maghreb Fez

Senior career*
Years	Team	Apps	(Gls)
2004–2006	Maghreb Fez	28	(3)
2006–2011	Wydad Casablanca	122	
2011–2013	Stade de Reims	20	(0)

International career^{‡}
	Morocco	1	(0)
- * Club domestic league appearances and goals as of 01:58, 23 August 2016 (UTC) ‡ National team caps and goals as of 21 June 2010

Khalid Sekkat (Arabic: خالد سقاط; born on 12 May 1984 in Fes) is a Moroccan footballer who plays for Wydad Casablanca and the Moroccan national team.
