= Yuriy Sevastyanenko =

Ukrainian association football manager

Personal information
- Full name: Yuriy Hryhorovych Sevastyanenko
- Date of birth: 2 January 1942 (age 84)
- Place of birth: Kopeysk, Russian SFSR
- Position: Forward

Senior career*
Years	Team	Apps	(Gls)
- FC Enerhiya Berdyansk
- FC Torpedo Berdyansk

Managerial career
- FC Torpedo Berdyansk
- 1988–1989: Olympique Club de Khouribga
- 1989–1994: Wydad AC
- 1995: Al-Nasr SC
- 1995–1996: Al-Shabab FC
- 1996–1997: CS Sfaxien
- 1997: Wydad AC
- 1999: Wydad AC
- 1999–2000: Al-Najma SC
- 2000–2001: Wydad AC
- 2001: Raja Casablanca
- 2001–2002: JS Massira
- 2008: Al Ahli SC
- 2012: MC El Eulma
- 2018: TAS de Casablanca
- * Club domestic league appearances and goals

Yuriy Hryhorovych Sevastyanenko (Note: Also known as Youri Sebastienko.) (Ukrainian: Юрій Григорович Севастьяненко; born 2 January 1942) is a Ukrainian retired football manager.

During his tenure with Wydad AC in 1989–1994, he won three Botola titles, in addition to the Moroccan Throne Cup, CAF Champions League, Arab Club Champions Cup, and Afro-Asian Club Championship.
