= 2001–02 Botola =

Moroccan football league season

Botola
- Season: 2001–02
- Champions: Hassania Agadir (1st title)

The 2001–02 Botola was the 46th season of the Moroccan Premier League. Hassania Agadir won the title for the first time in their history.
