= 2002–03 Botola =

Moroccan football league season

Botola
- Season: 2002–03
- Champions: Hassania Agadir (2nd title)
- Relegated: TS Casablanca (disbanded); FUS Rabat

The 2002–03 Botola is the 47th season of the Moroccan Premier League. Hassania Agadir are the holders of the title.

== Teams ==
- CODM Meknès
- Hassania Agadir
- Raja Casablanca
- Wydad Casablanca
- Maghreb Fez
- Jeunesse Massira
- SCCM Mohammédia
- Olympique Khouribga
- RS Settat
- FAR Rabat
- IZK Khemisset
- TS Casablanca
- IR Tanger
- FUS Rabat
- KAC Kenitra
- Kawkab Marrakech

== Final league table ==
Pos	Team	Pld	W	D	L	GF	GA	GD	Pts	Qualification or relegation
1	Hassania Agadir (C)	30	14	12	4	32	12	+20	54	GNF 1 Winners
2	Raja Casablanca	30	13	13	4	36	18	+18	52	
3	Wydad Casablanca	30	13	13	4	25	15	+10	52	
4	CODM Meknès	30	14	10	6	25	16	+9	52	
5	Maghreb Fez	30	13	10	7	34	20	+14	49	
6	Olympique Khouribga	30	12	8	10	27	24	+3	44	
7	SCCM de Mohammédia	30	8	13	9	23	26	−3	37	
8	Jeunesse Massira	30	7	13	10	25	32	−7	34	
9	FAR Rabat	30	7	12	11	27	29	−2	33	
10	TS Casablanca	30	6	15	9	23	27	−4	33	Merged with FUS Rabat
11	IZK Khemisset	30	6	15	9	22	30	−8	33	
12	RS Settat	30	7	11	12	19	26	−7	32	
13	Kawkab Marrakech	30	7	11	12	25	34	−9	32	
14	KAC Kenitra	30	6	13	11	20	24	−4	31	
15	IR Tanger	30	7	9	14	22	38	−16	30	Spared from relegation
16	FUS Rabat	30	5	12	13	13	27	−14	27	Relegated to GNF 2

Source: rsssf.com
(C) Champions

== Statistics ==
- Top Scorer : 14 goals scored by Mustapha Bidoudane - Raja Casablanca
- Best Attack : 36 goals scored by Raja Casablanca
- Best Defense : 12 goals conceded by Hassania Agadir
- Drawn Matches : 190
