= 1992–93 Moroccan Division Nationale I =

Moroccan football league season

Division Nationale I
- Season: 1992–93
- Champions: Wydad Casablanca (10th title)

The 1992–93 Division Nationale I is the 37th season of the Moroccan Premier League of association football. Wydad Casablanca are the holders of the title.
