= Mohamed Ali Diallo =

Burkinabé footballer

Mohamed Ali Diallo (born May 5, 1978) is a Burkinabé football player who has represented his national team.

He was part of the Burkinabé 2004 African Nations Cup team, who finished bottom of their group in the first round of competition, thus failing to secure qualification for the quarter-finals.

- 1998–2003: (Burkina Faso) ASFA Yennega
- 2003–2004: (Morocco) Raja Casablanca
- 2004–2010: (Burkina Faso) ASFA Yennega
