= Mustapha Bidoudane =

Moroccan footballer

Personal information
- Date of birth: 18 June 1976 (age 50)
- Place of birth: Rabat, Morocco
- Height: 1.85 m (6 ft 1 in)
- Position: Forward

Youth career
- –1995: FUS Rabat

Senior career*
Years	Team	Apps	(Gls)
1995–2000	FUS Rabat		
2000–2001	Al-Shabab		
2001–2002	FUS Rabat		
2002–2004	Raja CA		
2004–2005	Rostov	10	(1)
2005–2006	Raja CA		
2006–2007	Maghreb de Fès		
2007–2008	Club Africain	11	(2)
2008–2010	Wydad AC		
2010–2011	ASFAR		
2011–2012	Kawkab Marrakech		
2012–2014	Ittihad Khemisset		

International career
2002–2006	Morocco	9	(2)
- * Club domestic league appearances and goals

Mustapha Bidoudane (Arabic: مصطفى بيضوضان; born 18 June 1976) is a Moroccan former football player.
