= 1965–66 Moroccan Division Nationale I =

Moroccan football league season

Division Nationale I
- Season: 1965–66
- Champions: Wydad Casablanca (7th title)
- Top goalscorer: Hmida Azzaoui (14 goals)

The 1965–66 Division Nationale I is the 10th season of the Moroccan Premier League. Wydad Casablanca are the holders of the title.

== Participating teams ==
- Wydad Casablanca (WAC)
- Raja Casablanca (RCA)
- TAS Casablanca (TAS)
- Racing Casablanca (RAC)
- FUS Rabat (FUS)
- Maghreb Fez (MAS)
- Hassania Agadir (HUSA)
- Mouloudia Oujda (MCO)
- Kawkab Marrakech (KACM)
- Moghreb Tétouan (MAT)
- Stade Marocain (SM)
- RS Settat (RSS)
- Chabab Mohammédia (SCCM)
- COD Meknès (CODM)
