= 2005–06 Botola =

Moroccan football league season

Botola
- Season: 2005–06
- Champions: Wydad Casablanca (16th title)
- Relegated: Chabab Mohammédia; Union de Touarga

The 2005–06 season of the GNF 1 first division of Moroccan football.

== Teams ==
- AS Salé
- FAR Rabat
- Difaa El Jadida
- CODM Meknès
- IR Tanger
- IZK Khemisset
- Hassania Agadir
- Jeunesse Massira
- Union de Touarga
- Mouloudia Oujda
- SCCM de Mohammédia
- Moghreb Athletic Tétouan
- OC Khouribga
- Olympique Safi
- Wydad Casablanca
- Raja de Casablanca

== Final league table ==
Pos	Team	Pld	W	D	L	GF	GA	GD	Pts	Qualification or relegation
1	Wydad Casablanca (C)	30	17	10	3	33	16	+17	61	GNF 1 Winners
2	FAR Rabat	30	16	10	4	41	14	+27	58	
3	Olympique Khouribga	30	15	8	7	44	23	+21	53	
4	Raja Casablanca	30	13	12	5	34	24	+10	51	
5	Hassania Agadir	30	14	7	9	31	24	+7	49	
6	CODM de Meknes	30	10	11	9	23	25	−2	41	
7	Difaa El Jadida	30	8	16	6	29	26	+3	40	
8	IZK Khemisset	30	8	12	10	20	26	−6	36	
9	AS Salé	30	8	11	11	18	26	−8	35	
10	Olympique Safi	30	9	7	14	26	27	−1	34	
11	Mouloudia Oujda	30	8	10	12	27	30	−3	34	
12	Moghreb Athletic Tétouan	30	7	12	11	19	27	−8	33	
13	Jeunesse Massira	30	5	17	8	23	26	−3	32	
14	IR Tanger	30	6	11	13	22	29	−7	29	
15	Chabab Mohammédia	30	6	9	15	15	35	−20	27	Relegated to GNF 2
16	Union de Touarga	30	4	9	17	12	39	−27	21	Relegated to GNF 2

Source: rsssf.com
(C) Champions
