= 2000–01 Botola =

Moroccan football league season

Botola
- Season: 2000–01
- Champions: Raja Casablanca (7th title)

The 2000–01 Botola is the 45th season of the Moroccan Premier League. Raja Casablanca are the holders of the title.
