= 2003–04 Botola =

Moroccan football league season

Botola
- Season: 2003–04
- Champions: Raja Casablanca (8th title)
- Relegated: Renaissance Settat; KAC Kénitra

The 2003–04 Botola is the 48th season of the Moroccan Premier League. Raja Casablanca are the holders of the title.

== Teams ==
- CODM Meknès
- Hassania Agadir
- Raja Casablanca
- Wydad Casablanca
- Maghreb Fez
- Jeunesse Massira
- SCCM Mohammédia
- Olympique Khouribga
- AS Salé
- RS Settat
- FAR Rabat
- IZK Khemisset
- IR Tanger
- KAC Kenitra
- Mouloudia Oujda
- Kawkab Marrakech

== Final league standings ==
Pos	Team	Pld	W	D	L	GF	GA	GD	Pts
1	Raja Casablanca	30	15	11	4	36	18	+18	56
2	FAR Rabat	30	14	14	2	36	17	+19	56
3	AS Salé	30	15	6	9	33	23	+10	51
4	Wydad Casablanca	30	12	13	5	19	8	+11	49
5	Olympique Khouribga	30	13	9	8	30	17	+13	48
6	Olympique Meknès	30	12	12	6	30	22	+8	48
7	Mouloudia Oujda	30	10	9	11	23	29	−6	39
8	Maghreb Fès	30	9	11	10	28	32	−4	38
9	Hassania Agadir	30	9	10	11	23	26	−3	37
10	Kawkab Marrakech	30	7	15	8	24	24	0	36
11	Jeunesse El Massira	30	7	14	9	20	25	−5	35
12	IR Tanger	30	7	13	10	15	19	−4	34
13	Chabab Mohamédia	30	7	10	13	13	26	−13	31
14	IZK Khémisset	30	6	11	13	13	26	−13	29
15	Renaissance Settat	30	6	9	15	15	28	−13	27
16	KAC Kénitra	30	3	9	18	14	38	−24	18

Source: rsssf.com

Moroccan GNF 1 2003-04 winners
Raja Casablanca
8th title

== Statistics ==
Top scorers

- 13 Goals
  - Mustapha Bidoudane - Raja Casablanca
- 8 Goals
  - Mohamed Adjou - FAR Rabat
- 7 Goals
  - Mounir Benkassou - CODM de Meknes
- 6 Goals
  - Kepa Didi - IR Tanger
  - Hakim Ajraoui - CODM de Meknes
  - Hicham Zerouali - FAR Rabat
  - Hassan Alla - Mouloudia Oujda
  - Mulingui - MAS

Best Attack

- 36 Goals
  - Raja Casablanca
  - FAR Rabat
  - AS Salé

Best Defence

- 8 Goals Conceded
  - Wydad Casablanca
- 17 Goals Conceded
  - FAR Rabat
  - Olympique Khouribga
