= 2000 CAF Super Cup =

Raja CA	Africa Sports
(Morocco)	(Ivory Coast)
2	0
- Date: 5 March 2000
- Venue: Stade Mohammed V, Casablanca
- Referee: Ndoye Falla (Senegal)
- Attendance: 40,000

The 2000 CAF Super Cup was the eighth CAF Super Cup, an annual football match in Africa organized by the Confederation of African Football (CAF), between the winners of the previous season's two CAF club competitions, the African Cup of Champions Clubs and the African Cup Winners' Cup.

== Teams ==
Team	Qualification	Previous participation (bold indicates winners)
(Morocco) Raja CA	1999 CAF Champions League winner	1 (1998
(Ivory Coast) Africa Sports	1999 African Cup Winners' Cup winner	1 (**1993**)

== Match details ==
5 March 2000

Raja CA (Morocco)	2 – 0	(Ivory Coast) Africa Sports
El Moubarki 52'; Armoumen 86'	Report

Stade Mohammed V
Attendance: 40,000
Referee: Falla N'Doye (Senegal)

CAF Super Cup 2000

**Raja CA**
**First Title**
