= 2004–05 Botola =

Moroccan football league season

Botola
- Season: 2004–05
- Champions: FAR Rabat (11th title)
- Relegated: Maghreb Fez; Kawkab Marrakech

The "2004–05 Botola season" of the first division of Moroccan football.

== Teams ==
- CODM Meknès
- Hassania Agadir
- Raja Casablanca
- Wydad Casablanca
- Maghreb Fez
- Jeunesse Massira
- SCCM Mohammédia
- Olympique Khouribga
- AS Salé
- FAR Rabat
- IZK Khemisset
- Olympique Safi
- IR Tanger
- Union Touarga
- Mouloudia Oujda
- Kawkab Marrakech

== Final league standings ==
Pos	Team	Pld	W	D	L	GF	GA	GD	Pts
1	FAR Rabat	30	17	11	2	35	9	+26	62
2	Raja Casablanca	30	18	6	6	42	17	+25	60
3	Wydad Casablanca	30	12	14	4	32	14	+18	50
4	Olympique Safi	30	10	11	9	25	22	+3	41
5	Jeunesse El Massira	30	9	12	9	26	25	+1	39
6	IZK Khemisset	30	7	16	7	18	21	−3	37
7	Olympique Khouribga	30	7	15	8	24	29	−5	36
8	Union Touarga	30	9	9	12	27	33	−6	36
9	Hassania Agadir	30	6	18	6	19	21	−2	36
10	AS Salé	30	9	8	13	25	33	−8	35
11	SCCM Mohammedia	30	8	10	12	18	24	−6	34
12	IR Tanger	30	6	15	9	19	28	−9	33
13	Mouloudia Oujda	30	7	12	11	21	27	−6	33
14	CODM Meknes	30	8	9	13	16	22	−6	33
15	Maghreb Fez	30	6	14	10	22	26	−4	32
16	Kawkab Marrakech	30	5	12	13	17	35	−18	27

Source: rsssf.com

== Teams that qualified for international competitions ==
- CAF Champions League : FAR Rabat and Raja Casablanca
- Arab Champions League : Raja Casablanca, Wydad Casablanca and Olympique Safi
- CAF Confederation Cup : Olympique Khouribga

== Top scorers ==
- 12 Goals
  - Mohamed Armoumen - FAR Rabat
- 11 Goals
  - Hicham Aboucherouane - Raja Casablanca
- 9 Goals
  - Didier Knippa - CODM Meknes
  - Soufiane Alloudi - Raja Casablanca
- 8 Goals
  - Hicham Jouiâa - Olympique Safi
- 7 Goals
  - Dlimi Laâroussi - Jeunesse Massira
  - Jaouad Ouaddouch - FAR Rabat
  - Amine Kabli - AS Salé
  - Osmane Diop - IR Tanger
  - Khalid Bakhouch - IZK Khemisset
  - Rachid Nourri - SCCM de Mohammédia
- 6 Goals
  - Youssef Mrabeh et Abdelali Boustani - Union de Touarga
  - Rafik Abdessamad - Olympique Khouribga
  - Mohamed Benchrifa - Widad Casablanca
  - Mohcine Mabrouk - Olympique Safi
  - Adil Lotfi - Kawkab Marrakech
