= 1999–2000 GNF 1 =

Moroccan football league season

Botola
- Season: 1999–2000
- Champions: Raja Casablanca (6th title)

The 1999–2000 Botola is the 44th season of the Moroccan Premier League. Raja Casablanca are the holders of the title.
