= 1991–92 Moroccan Division Nationale I =

Moroccan football league season

Division Nationale I
- Season: 1991–92
- Champions: Kawkab Marrakech (2nd title)

The 1991–92 Division Nationale I is the 36th season of the Moroccan Premier League. Kawkab Marrakech are the holders of the title.

== Participating teams ==
- Wydad Casablanca (WAC)
- Raja Casablanca (RCA)
- Olympique Casablanca (OC)
- FAR Rabat (ASFAR)
- TAS Casablanca (TAS)
- FUS Rabat (FUS)
- Maghreb Fez (MAS)
- Kenitra AC (KAC)
- USM Oujda (USMO)
- Kawkab Marrakech (KACM)
- Hassania Agadir (HUSA)
- RS Settat (RSS)
- Difaâ Hassani El Jadidi (DHJ)
- Raja Beni Mellal (RBM)
- Ittihad Tanger (IRT)
- Olympique Khouribga (OCK)
