= 1998 Afro-Asian Club Championship =

Pohang Steelers	Raja CA
(South Korea)	(Morocco)
2	3

First leg
Pohang Steelers	Raja CA
2	2
- Date: November 1998
- Venue: Pohang Steel Yard, Pohang

Second leg
Raja CA	Pohang Steelers
1	0
- Date: December 1998
- Venue: Stade Mohamed V, Casablanca

The 1998 Afro-Asian Club Championship, was the 11th and the last Afro-Asian Club Championship competition. It was endorsed by the Confederation of African Football (CAF) and Asian Football Confederation (AFC) and contested between the winners of the CAF Champions League and the Asian Club Championship.

In 1998 the final was contested in two-legged home-and-away format between Korean team Pohang Steelers and Moroccan Raja Casablanca. The first leg was hosted by Pohang Steelers at the Pohang Steel Yard in Pohang in November 1998. The second leg was hosted by Raja CA at Stade Mohamed V in Casablanca in December 1998.

The aggregate score was 3–2 with Raja CA winning. This was their only Afro-Asia Club Championship win.

== Teams ==
Team	Qualification	Previous participation
(South Korea) Pohang Steelers	1997–98 Asian Club Championship winner	1997 Afro-Asian Club Championship
(Morocco) Raja CA	1997 CAF Champions League winner	None

== Winner ==
1998 Afro-Asian Club Championship winners
(Morocco)
Raja CA
First title
