= 1997–98 GNF 1 =

Moroccan football league season

Botola
- Season: 1997–98
- Champions: Raja Casablanca (4th title)

The 1997–98 Botola is the 42nd season of the Moroccan Premier League. Raja Casablanca are the holders of the title.
