= 1996–97 GNF 1 =

Moroccan football league season

Botola
- Season: 1996–97
- Champions: Raja Casablanca (3rd title)

The 1996–97 Botola is the 41st season of the Moroccan Premier League. Raja Casablanca are the holders of the title.
