= 1995–96 Moroccan Division Nationale I =

Moroccan football league season

Botola
- Season: 1995–96
- Champions: Raja Casablanca (2nd title)

The 1995–96 Botola was the 40th season of the Moroccan Premier League. Raja Casablanca won the title.
