= 1995–96 Moroccan Throne Cup =

Tournament details
- Country: Morocco

Final positions
- Champions: Raja Club Athletic

The 1995–96 season of the Moroccan Throne Cup was the 40th edition of the competition.

Raja Club Athletic won the cup, beating FAR de Rabat 1–0 in the final, played at the Stade Hassan II in Fès. Raja Club Athletic won the cup for the fourth time in their history.

== Competition ==
=== Last 16 ===
Team 1	Team 2	Result
Raja Club Athletic	Fath Union Sport	1–0
Wydad Athletic Club	ASO Formation Professionnelle	5–1
???	???	?–?
???	???	?–?
???	???	?–?
???	???	?–?
???	???	?–?
???	???	?–?

=== Quarter-finals ===
Team 1	Team 2	Result
Raja Club Athletic	Wydad Athletic Club	5–1
???	???	?–?
???	???	?–?
???	???	?–?

=== Semi-finals ===
Team 1	Team 2	Result
Raja Club Athletic	Rachad Bernoussi	3–0
FAR de rabat	Union Sidi Kacem	2-1

=== Final ===
The final took place between the two winning semi-finalists, Raja Club Athletic and FAR de Rabat, on 7 April 1996 at the stade Hassan II in Fès.

1995–96 Moroccan Throne Cup Final
7 April 1996

Raja Club Athletic	1–0	FAR de Rabat
	Report

Stade Hassan II, Fès
Attendance: 20,000
Referee: Said Belqola
