= Olympique Club de Khouribga =

Moroccan football club

OC Khouribga
- Full name: Olympique Club de Khouribga
- Nickname: OCK
- Founded: 13 June 1923; 103 years ago
- Ground: Phosphate Stadium
- Capacity: 10,000
- Chairman: Taoufik Samsam
- Manager: Redouane Baqlal
- League: Botola Pro 2
- 2025–26: National, 2nd of 16 (promoted)
- Website: ock.ma
Home colours	Away colours	Third colours

Olympique Club de Khouribga, known simply as OCK, is a Moroccan professional football club based in Khouribga.

== History ==
The club was founded in 1923 and is considered one of the oldest clubs in Morocco. The club first entered the first division of the Moroccan league in the 1982–83 season. Olympique Club Khouribga holds 2 Moroccan cups or what is called the Throne cup (2006 and 2015) and 2 Moroccan Championship in 1989 and 2007.

On 17 November 2022, Khouribga sacked Lassaad Dridi for the team's poor performance. In December 2022, OCK appointed the Portuguese manager Ricardo Formosinho.

== Current squad ==
As of 24 November 2021

Note: Flags indicate national team as defined under FIFA eligibility rules; some limited exceptions apply. Players may hold more than one non-FIFA nationality.

No.	Pos.	Nation	Player
1	GK	MAR	Mohamed Akid
2	MF	MAR	Jalal Tachtach
3	DF	MAR	Yassine Morsil
4	MF	MAR	Ayman Awani
5	MF	MAR	Oussama Haffari
6	MF	MAR	Said Grada
7	FW	BOT	Kabelo Seakanyeng
8	MF	MAR	Houssam Amaanan
10	MF	MAR	Najib El Mouatani
11	FW	SEN	Adama Diom
12	GK	MAR	Abderrahmane Kernane
14	MF	MAR	Said Grada
15	DF	MAR	Youssef Oggadi
17	FW	MAR	Hamza El Fatouaki
18	FW	BOT	Tumisang Orebonye
19	MF	MAR	Saad Al Mir

No.	Pos.	Nation	Player
21	FW	MAR	Ismail El Harrach
22	GK	MAR	Mohamed Ferni
23	DF	MAR	Zouheir El Hachemi
24	MF	MAR	Anass Ouerdani
25	DF	MAR	Omar Taheloucht
26	DF	MAR	Anwar Satila
28	FW	MAR	Mustapha El Yousfi
30	FW	MAR	Mohamed Kassou
31	DF	ALG	Walid Bencherifa
34	MF	MAR	Yassine Abdelali
37	MF	MAR	Hamza Kalai
38	DF	MAR	Youssef Abouzid
77	FW	BDI	Abdul Razak Fiston
99	MF	MAR	Zineddine Derrag

== Notable coaches ==
- (Ukraine) Yuriy Sevastyanenko (1988–89)
- (Brazil) José Faria (1995–97)
- (France) François Bracci (2007)
- (France) Richard Tardy (July 1, 2008 – March 31, 2009)
- (Morocco) Youssef Lamrini (July 2010–12)
- (Morocco) Badou Zaki (July 2012–12)
- (France) François Bracci (July 1, 2012–12)
- (Morocco) Fouad Sahabi (Dec 5, 2012 – Dec 31, 2013)
- (Morocco) Mohammed Laksir (2014–2018)

== Achievements ==
- Moroccan League

2007
Runner-up : 1984, 1996, 2015

- Moroccan Cup

2006, 2015
Runner-up : 1981, 1994, 1995, 2005

- Arab Cup Winners' Cup: 1

1996

- Champions Cup Mediterranean Sea: 1947

== Performance in CAF competitions ==
- CAF Champions League: 1 appearance

2008 – Third Round

- CAF Confederation Cup: 3 appearances

2005 – First Round
2006 – Group stage
2008 – Third Round
