= 1998–99 GNF 1 =

Moroccan football league season

Botola
- Season: 1998–99
- Champions: Raja Casablanca (5th title)

The 1998–99 Botola is the 43rd season of the Moroccan Premier League. Raja Casablanca are the holders of the title.
