= Raja CA Under-23s and Academy =

Raja CA Under-23s & Academy
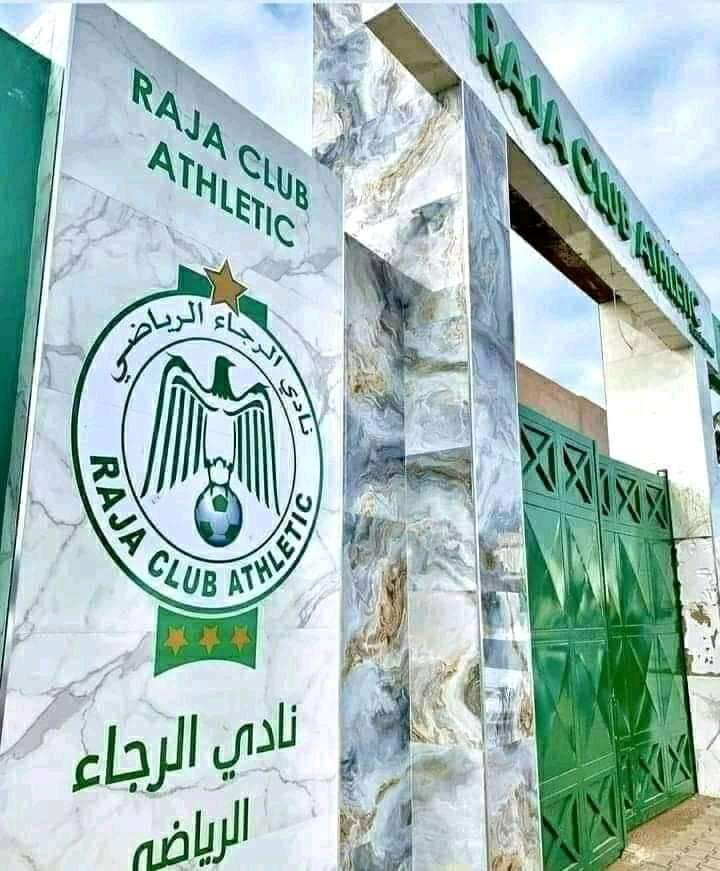
- Entry gate of the Oasis Complex
- Full name: Raja Club Athletic Under-23s & Academy
- Nicknames: Green Eagles الرجاء العالمي (Worldwide Raja) نادي الشعب (The People's Club) الخضرة الوطنية (The National Green)
- Founded: 20 March 1949; 77 years ago
- Ground: Stade Mohammed V Raja CA Academy; Raja-Oasis Sports Complex

Raja CA Under-23s and Academy are the youth teams of Raja CA. The U23 team (or reserve team) mainly consists of Under-23 players and some senior players that occasionally join them, for instance when they are recovering from injury. The Academy refers to the other development teams below under-23, that complete Raja's youth system: Espoirs (under-21); Juniors "A" and "B"; Cadets "A", "B" and ''C''; Minimes "A", "B" and "C".

Raja CA is a leading club academy in Morocco. Their first team had historically relied heavily on academy players while their youth teams are competitive in the different leagues at the regional, inter-regional and national levels. It has produced many notable players such as Houmane Jarir, Saïd Ghandi, Petchou, Abdelmajid Dolmy, Mustapha El Haddaoui, Redouane Hajry, Mustapha Khalif, Mustapha Moustawdae, Salaheddine Bassir, Omar Nejjary, Abdelilah Fahmi, Talal El Karkouri, Marouane Zemmama, Amin Erbati, Hicham Aboucherouane, Mouhcine Iajour, Mohsine Moutaouali, Abdelilah Hafidi, Badr Benoun and Soufiane Rahimi, among many others.

The youth teams play their home games at Oasis Sports Complex or at the Raja Academy. Up until 2011, the reserves frequently played the Derby against Wydad AC in Stade Mohammed-V before the first team Derby kick-off.

== Academy ==
Raja's academy in the Oasis Sports Complex was one of the first football centres to comply with international standards in Africa, and the first to adopt the "sport-study" system that combine both football and education in Morocco. In 2021, it was chosen by the technical direction of the Royal Moroccan Football Federation as the best player development center.

The club's development strategies have long been run by Abdelkader Jalal, a former Raja player and its main head of player development between 1950 and 1989, retiring only after an accident that occurred in 23 May and cost him his left hand. After the opening of the development centre in 1999, the management was given to experienced coaches who were also former Raja players like Fathi Jamal, Mhamed Fakhir and Mohamed Madih. Raja was the first Moroccan club to offer to its young players a sporting and educational program that was provided by the OFPPT. The first generation consisted of 26 selected players, aged between 16 and 17 with the exception of goalscorer Tarik Bendamou and the goalkeeper Yassine El Had who are respectively 13 and 14 years old. In general, the club relies on its former players to coach youth teams to conserve the club's football style.

CL titles	Academy-graduates winners
1989	Mustapha Khalif, Abderrahim Hamraoui, Mustapha Moustawdae, Abdeljalil Bouchari, Tijani El Maâtaoui, Mustapha El Gherchi; Hassan Mouahid, Khalid Moussalek, Mustapha Soueib, Abdelghani Zerraf, Mohamed Madih, Abdelhak Souadi, Rachid Jebrane (13)
1997	Abdelilah Fahmi, Omar Nejjary, Mustapha Khalif, Mustapha Moustawdae, Redouane El Haimer, Rimy Zitouni; Hafid Abdessadek, Talal El Karkouri (8)
1999	Omar Nejjary, Mustapha Khalif, Mustapha Moustawdae, Hamid Nater, Zakaria Aboub, Redouane El Haimer, Talal El Karkouri; Zekmous, Mohamed Armoumen, Nabil Mesloub, Hicham Misbah, Adil Serraj, Hafid Abdessadek, Mohamed Kharbouch (14)

In September 2022, Raja CA Academy finally opened its doors after a year delay due to the COVID-19 pandemic. In addition to the first team facilities, it houses the club's academy structure that offers to its young footballers, in association with the Oasis Complex, accommodation, education and a high-level football development. The facilities were built for the first team and the youth teams competing in their respective championships (U17, U19, U21). The younger teams are trained in Oasis. The academy is equipped with a natural grass pitch, a new generation synthetic turf and four mini-football. The sports center has also a gym, a rehabilitation room, a medical center and a restaurant.

Raja CA's youth teams are generally dominant in their national championships like in the 2014–15 season, when both U17 and U19 teams won th national league. Since 2019, the U21 team no longer compete with their peers since their promotion to senior football at the D5 Championship. They finished second twice in a row, in 2019-20 and 2020–21 and came close to promotion to D4 under the management of Bouchaib El Moubarki.

In November 2023, club's president Mohamed Boudrika stated that the Academy, apart from the first teams, host twelve football teams, three futsal teams and three women teams.

In September 2025, the club reorganized its structure by dividing the youth team into two categories:

- The U23 reserve team will continue playing in the second division amateur league, with the possibility of including reserve first-team players. The board kept Mohamed Armoumen as head coach.
- The U21 youth team: will participate in the U21 Botola, with the same schedule of the first team. Noureddine Ziyati was appointed to coach this team.

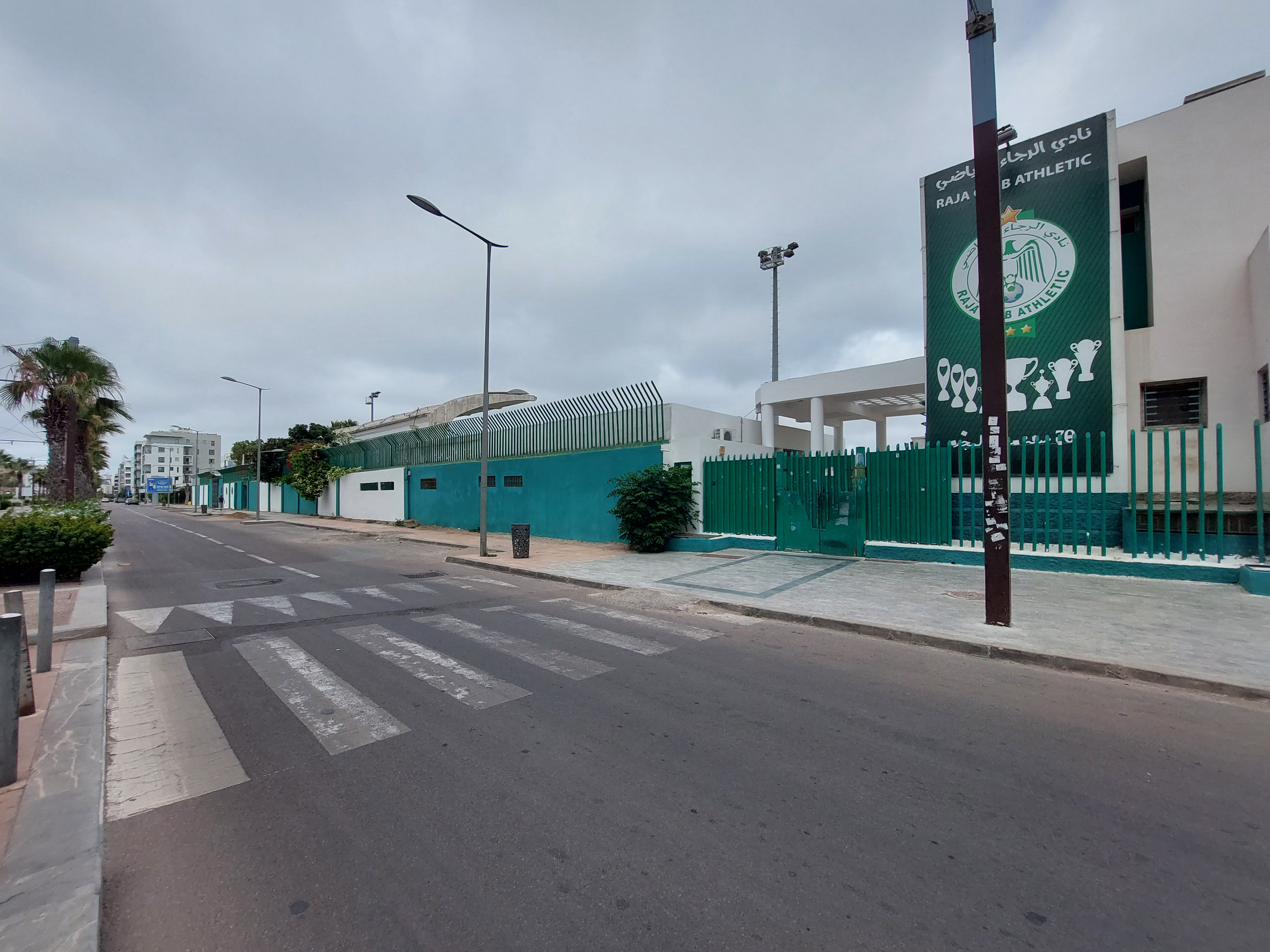
Raja-Oasis Sports Complex

== U-23s team ==
Due to the high number of players in the Academy, each age category have two or three teams (for example: Juniors A, Juniors B...) that compete in regional or inter-regional competitions, in addition to the main teams that respectively play in the U-15, U-17, U-19 and U-21 national leagues . After their promotion to senior football in 2019, the reserve category has one single team that directly give players to the first team.

=== Current squad ===
As of 28 September 2023

Note: Flags indicate national team as defined under FIFA eligibility rules; some limited exceptions apply. Players may hold more than one non-FIFA nationality.

No.	Pos.	Nation	Player
—	GK	MAR	Yassine Zoubir
—	GK	MAR	Hatim Siouah
—	GK	MAR	Nabil Douah
—	GK	MAR	Adam Alami
—	DF	MAR	Mehdi Mchakhchekh (Vice-Captain)
—	DF	MAR	Saad Chamach
—	DF	SEN	Ibrahima
—	DF	MAR	Abdellah Azrour
—	DF	MAR	Mohamed Youssef Gaidi
—	DF	MAR	Karim Achqar
—	DF	MAR	Adham Al Khalfi (Captain)
—	MF	MAR	Yassine Oumast
—	MF	MAR	Anouar Aalam
—	MF	MAR	Saad Essamouani

No.	Pos.	Nation	Player
—	MF	GUI	Ahmadou Camara
—	MF	MAR	Brahim Bensaber
—	MF	MAR	Youness Barti
—	MF	MAR	Ziad Nejjary
—	FW	MAR	Houssam Djellal
—	FW	MAR	Akram El Khouidssi
—	FW	MAR	Yasser Zahli
—	FW	MLI	Idrissa
—	FW	MAR	Hamza Moustawdae
—	FW	MAR	Amine Essabah
—	FW	MAR	Youssef Hafidi
—	FW	MAR	Mansour Nachet
—	FW	MAR	Reda Smaili

=== Season by season ===
On 19 May 2019, Raja played the U-21 national league play-offs final and gained promotion for the first time to a senior league, which is Amateurs 3 (North West Group), the fifth level of Moroccan football, despite losing to Kawkab Marrakech on penalties after a 0–0 draw.

Season	Competition	Position	Pts	Pld	W	D	L	GF	GA	GD	Ref.
2019–20	Amateurs 3 (North West)	2	54	30	16	6	8	47	34	+13	
2020–21	Amateurs 3 (North West)	2	55	30	17	4	9	43	29	+14	
2021–22	Amateurs 3 (North West)	3	55	30	16	7	7	58	27	+31	
2022–23	Amateurs 3 (North West)	2	58	30	17	7	6	61	24	+37	
2023–24	Amateurs 3 (North West)	5	43	30	12	7	11	37	37	+0	

=== Manager history ===
- (Morocco) Hamid Bahij (1976–1978)
- (Morocco) Hamid Bahij (1982–1984)
- (Morocco) Mhamed Fakhir (1986–1988)
- (Morocco) Abdelkader Jalal (1988–1989)
- (Morocco) Mhamed Fakhir (1989–1992)
- (Morocco) Mohamed Nejmi (1998–2003)
- (Morocco) Said Seddiki (2007–2010)
- (Morocco) Hilal Et–tair (2010–2012)
- (Morocco) Mohamed Bekkari (2012–2014)
- (Morocco) Mohamed Oustad (2014–2015)
- (Morocco) Omar Nejjary (2015)
- (Morocco) Redouane Hajry (2015–2017)
- (Morocco) Mohamed Oustad (2017–2018)
- (Morocco) Abdelilah Fahmi (2018–2019)
- (Morocco) Bouchaib El Moubarki (2019–2022)
- (Morocco) Nabil Mesloub (2022–2023)
- (Morocco) Rachid Soulaimani (2023–2024)
- (France) Jean-Marc Nobilo (2024)
- (Morocco) Mohamed Armoumen (2024–)

== Management team ==
As of 11 January 2026

Sporting director	(Portugal) Rogério Matias
Scouting director	(Portugal) Rui Amaro
Head of Player Development	(Portugal) Silveira Ramos
Under-23s head coach	(Morocco) Mohamed Armoumen
Under-21s head coach	(Morocco) Noureddine Ziyati
Under-18s head coach	(Morocco) Rachid Soulaimani
Under-16s head coach	(Morocco) Hamid Nater
Under-15s head coach	(Morocco) Mustapha Khalif
Under-14s head coach	(Morocco) Adil Bekkari
Under-13s head coach	(Morocco) Mustapha Moustawdae

== International youth graduates ==
This is a list of former Raja CA youth graduates who have gone on to represent their country at full senior international level.

As of 11 January 2026

Player	Years played in the Academy	Years played for first team	National team	Years played for national team	Notes	Ref.
Mohamed Roudani	1950–1951	1951–1964	Morocco	1957–1960	He was part of the first Moroccan national team at the 1957 Arab Games	
Moussa Hanoun	1951–1953	1953–1963; 1964–1966	Morocco	1963–1964		
Hamid Bahij	1951–1954	1954–1964; 1966–1967	Morocco	1959–1966	Winner of 1961 Arab Games and played the 1964 Olympics	
Mohamed Bhaïja	1952–1956	1956–1971	Morocco	1960–1966		
Mustapha Fahim	1954–1956	1956–1967	Morocco	1959–1964		
Ali Bendayan	1958–1963	1963–1971	Morocco	1963–1969		
Houmane Jarir	1955–1962	1962–1977	Morocco	1966–1970	He scored Morocco's first-ever World Cup goal	
Saïd Ghandi	1955–1964	1964–1979	Morocco	1966–1974		
Abdallah Zhar	1953–1956	1965–1966	Morocco	1960–1966		
Mohamed Bénini	1959–1965	1965–1977	Morocco	1965–1966		
Mohamed Maaroufi	1960–1965	1965–1966	Morocco	1967–1974		
Mustapha Choukri	1956–1966	1966–1975	Morocco	1970–1979		
Abdelhak Fethi	1965–1971	1971–1986	Morocco	1977–1980		
Abdelmajid Hadry	1966–1971	1971–1979	Morocco	1972–1973		
Abdelmajid Dolmy	1969–1974	1971–1987; 1990–1991	Morocco	1971–1988	Winner of 1976 AFCON and one of Morocco's most-capped players	
Jawad El Andaloussi	1965–1972	1972–1977; 1983–1985	Morocco	1976–1981	Winner of 1976 AFCON	
Abdellatif Beggar	1965–1973	1974–1978; 1979–1983; 1986–1987	Morocco	1979–1981		
Najib Mokhles	1971–1975	1975–1982	Morocco	1976–1979		
Abdelhak Souadi	1970–1977	1977–1986	Morocco	1983–1988	Winner of 1983 Mediterranean Games and runner-up of 1985 Arab Games	
Hassan Mouahid	1973–1978	1978–1990	Morocco	1986–1988		
Mustapha El Haddaoui	1973–1979	1979–1985	Morocco	1982–1994	Winner of 1983 Mediterranean Games and runner-up of 1985 Arab Games	
Mohamed Nejmi	1973–1974	1979–1989	Morocco	1981–1983		
Aziz Kharbouch	1972–1979	1979–1980; 1983–1988	Morocco	1987–1988		
Abderrahim Hamraoui	1973–1982	1982–1993	Morocco	1986–1988		
Redouane Hajry	1975–1985	1985–1987	Morocco	1993–1995		
Tijani El Maataoui	1980–1985	1985–1993	Morocco	1988–1993		
Mustapha Khalif	1985–1988	1988–2000	Morocco	1993–1998		
Mustapha Moustawdae	1987–1989	1988–1999	Morocco	1994–1998		
Salaheddine Bassir	1983–1991	1991–1997	Morocco	1994–2002	Morocco's all-time second top goalscorer.	
Omar Nejjary	1988–1992	1992–2000; 2007–2010	Morocco	1996		
Abdelilah Fahmi	1988–1993	1994–1999	Morocco	1995–2005		
Talal El Karkouri	1994–1995	1995–2000	Morocco	2000–2009	Runner-up of AFCON 2004 and 2005 Islamic Solidarity Games	
Mohamed Kharbouch	1994–1997	1997–2003	Morocco	2000–2001		
Hafid Abdessadek	1992–1997	1997–2002	Morocco	2006		
Adil Serraj	1989–1998	1998–2000	Morocco	2008		
Hicham Misbah	1994–1999	1999–2007	Morocco	2004		
Zakaria Aboub	1993–1999	1999–2002	Morocco	2004–2007		
Sami Tajeddine	1993–2000	2000–2009	Morocco	2002–2004		
Mohamed Armoumen	1995–2000	2000–2003; 2008–2009	Morocco	2002–2006	Winner of 2001 Jeux de la Francophonie	
Nabil Mesloub	1996–2000	2000–2011	Morocco	2002–2006		
Marouane Zemmama	1997–2000	2000–2006; 2013–2014	Morocco	2008–2009	Runner-up of 2005 Islamic Solidarity Games	
Amin Erbati	1997–2001	2001–2008; 2010–2013	Morocco	2002–2009		
Hicham Aboucherouane	1999–2001	2001–2007; 2010–2011	Morocco	2002–2009		
Mouhcine Iajour	1998–2003	2004–2007; 2012–2014; 2017–2019	Morocco	2004–2015		
Modibo Maïga	2004–2005	2005–2007	Mali	2007–2016	Bronze medalist of 2013 AFCON	
Abdessamad Chahiri	2003–2005	2005–2007	Morocco	2007–2008		
Said Fattah	1996–2004	2005–2011; 2014–2015	Morocco	2011–2012		
Mohsine Moutaouali	1994–2006	2006–2014; 2019–2022	Morocco	2012–2015		
Abdou Razack Traoré	2006–2007	2006–2007	Burkina Faso	2011–	Runner-up of 2013 AFCON and bronze medalist of 2017 AFCON	
Mohamed Oulhaj	1999–2007	2007–2019	Morocco	2008–2014		
Yassine Salhi	2006–2007	2007–2016	Morocco	2011–2012	Winner of 2012 Arab Cup	
Ismail Belmaalem	1999–2009	2009–2015; 2018	Morocco	2012	Winner of 2012 Arab Cup	
Mohamed Chibi	2001–2011	2011–2013	Morocco	2021–	Winner of 2013 Islamic Solidarity Games	
Abdelilah Hafidi	2009–2011	2011–2022; 2023	Morocco	2013–2021	Winner of 2018 CHAN and 2020 CHAN	
Marouane Hadhoudi	2003–2011	2020–2023	Morocco	2018	Winner of 2018 CHAN	
Badr Benoun	2001–2013	2015–2020	Morocco	2016–	Winner of 2018 CHAN and 2013 Islamic Solidarity Games Fourth of the 2022 World Cup	
Abderrahim Achchakir	2000–2003	2017–2021	Morocco	2013–2015		
Soufiane Rahimi	2006–2017	2018–2021	Morocco	2021–	Winner and best player of 2020 CHAN	
Nawfel Zerhouni	2006–2015	2015–2016; 2023–2024	Morocco	2018	Winner of 2020 CHAN	
Azzedine Ounahi	2010–2015	–	Morocco	2022–	Fourth of the 2022 World Cup	
Reda Slim	2014–2017	–	Morocco	2021	Winner of 2020 CHAN	
Imad Riahi	2010–2019	–	Morocco	2025	Winner of 2024 CHAN	
Ayoub Khairi	2012–2018	2018–2021	Morocco	2025	Winner of 2024 CHAN	
Soufiane Rahimi	2006–2017	2018–2021	Morocco	2025–	Winner of 2025 AFCON	
Mohamed Chibi	2001–2011	2011–2014	Morocco	2025–	Winner of 2025 AFCON	

== Honours ==
This list only includes U-23s honours in national leagues:

- Championnat du Maroc Espoirs / GNF (until 2018–19)
  - Winners: 1988–89, 1989–90, 1990–91,1991–92, 1994–95, 1995–96, 1996–97, 1997–98, 1998–99, 2000–01, 2001–02, 2003–04, 2004–05, 2005–06, 2006–07, 2007–08, 2008–09, 2009–10, 2011–12, 2012–13, 2013–14.
  - Runners-up: 2010–11, 2014–15, 2015–16, 2018–19.
- Amateurs 3 (North West)
  - Runners-up: 2019–20, 2020–21, 2022–23.
