= 2006–07 Raja CA season =

Raja CA
2006–07 season
- President: Abdelhamid Souiri (until 11 January); Abdellah Rhallam
- Manager: Oscar Fullone (until 6 December); Paco Fortes (until 3 April); Mohamed Nejmi
- Stadium: Stade Mohamed V
- Botola: 11th
- Moroccan Throne Cup: Quarter final
- Arab Champions league: Round of 16
- Top goalscorer: League: Soufiane Alloudi (11); All: Soufiane Alloudi (17)
- Biggest win: 5–1 v MC Oujda (Home, 13 May 2007, Botola)

The 2006–07 season is Raja Club Athletic's 58th season in existence and the club's 51st consecutive season in the top flight of Moroccan football. In addition to the domestic league, they are also participating in this season's editions of the Throne Cup and the Arab Champions league. This is the first season since 1992–93 without club legend Redouane El Haimer who retired and the first since 2000–01 without Merouane Zemmama who joined Hibernian FC in a controversial transfer.

Raja CA kicked off the season with a 8–0 home win against Markaz Tulkarem in the first round of the Arab Champions league.

== Squad ==
Note: Flags indicate national team as defined under FIFA eligibility rules; some limited exceptions apply. Players may hold more than one non-FIFA nationality.

No.	Pos.	Nation	Player
1	DF	MAR	Younes Ataba
2	DF	MAR	Abdessamad Chahiri
3	DF	MAR	Zakaria Zerouali
4	FW	MAR	Abderrahim Chkilit
6	DF	MAR	Yassine Remch
8	DF	MAR	Abdellatif Jrindou (captain)
9	FW	MAR	Mouhcine Iajour
10	MF	VEN	Jesús Gómez
11	MF	MAR	Nabil Mesloub
12	GK	MAR	Khalid Fouhami
13	MF	MAR	Omar Nejjary
14	FW	GAM	Ousman Jallow
15	MF	MAR	Hamid Nater
17	MF	MAR	Rachid Soulaimani
18	DF	MAR	Adil Bekkari

No.	Pos.	Nation	Player
19	MF	MAR	Hicham Misbah
20	MF	MAR	Hassan Daoudi
21	MF	VEN	Jonathan Laurens
22	GK	MAR	Yassine El Had
23	DF	MAR	Abdelouahed Chakhsi
24	DF	MAR	Sami Tajeddine
25	FW	MAR	Khalid Sbai
26	MF	MAR	Said Fettah
27	FW	SEN	Hassan Tair
29	FW	MAR	Hicham Aboucherouane
33	GK	MAR	Ismail Kouha
—	MF	MAR	Reda Sakim
—	MF	MAR	Saïd Kherrazi
—	MF	MAR	Noureddine Zahidi

== Pre-season ==
On 12 July 2006, the club held its annual general meeting, which was marked by significant tension between the board of directors and some members. President Abdelhamid Souiri spoke at length to defend the board's record and explain controversial decisions, particularly Raja's withdrawal from the Throne Cup against Hassania Agadir, which he presented as a sporting and organizational choice, not a political one. Meanwhile, Secretary General Mustapha Hannaoui presented a particularly lengthy report, outlining the club's sporting results, administrative management and various activities during the season. The financial report showed a surplus of 3.8 million dirhams. Finally, Souiri announced that ODEP would return to Raja as a sponsor in September and selected 12 members to renew its committee: Salaheddine Mezouar, Rachid Andaloussi, Mohamed Al Arsi, Khalid Ibrahimi, Said Ouahbi, Karim Yousfi, Hassan Snini, Delhi, Abdellatif Amine, Mohieddine, Tahiri, and Mohamed Saïboub.

During the 2006 summer transfer window, Raja experienced a wave of departures of key players such as Marouane Zemmama, Modibo Maïga, Abdelouahad Abdessamad, Tarik Bendamou, Noureddine Harouach, and the previous season's top scorer, Mustapha Bidoudane.

On 2 August 2006, the club announced the list of 37 players selected by Oscar Fulloné to attend the training camp in Ifrane from August 4 to 24.

=== Ntifi Tournament ===
Date	Round	Opponents	Venue	Result	Scorers	Report
24 August 2006	Semi-final	Racing AC	Père Jégo Stadium, Casablanca	2–0	Soudiane Alloudi	Report
27 August 2006	Final	(United Arab Emirates) Al Ain Club	Père Jégo Stadium, Casablanca	0–0 (3–4p)		Report

== Competitions ==
=== Overview ===
Competition	First match	Last match	Starting round	Final position	Record							
Competition	First match	Last match	Starting round	Final position	Pld	W	D	L	GF	GA	GD	Win %
Botola	17 September 2006	26 May 2007	Matchday 1	11th	30	7	14	9	23	20	+3	23.33
Throne Cup	11 February 2007	20 October 2007	Round of 32	Quarter-final	3	2	0	1	5	2	+3	66.67
Arab Champions League	13 September 2006	26 November 2006	Round of 32	Round of 16	4	2	2	0	18	4	+14	50.00
Total					37	11	16	10	46	26	+20	29.73

Last updated: 26 May 2007
Source: RSSSF

=== Botola ===
==== League table ====
Pos	Team	Pld	W	D	L	GF	GA	GD	Pts	Qualification or relegation (Note: Rachad Bernoussi qualified for the 2008 CAF Confederation Cup as the 2007 Coupe du Trône runner-up.)
1	Olympique Khouribga	30	17	11	2	38	16	+22	62	2008 CAF Champions League
2	FAR Rabat	30	16	7	7	31	17	+14	55	2008 CAF Champions League
3	Moghreb Athletic Tétouan	30	15	9	6	37	31	+6	54	2007–08 Arab Champions League
4	Wydad Casablanca	30	11	14	5	30	20	+10	47	2007–08 Arab Champions League
5	Difaa El Jadida	30	9	15	6	29	19	+10	42	
6	Kawkab Marrakech	30	10	12	8	23	17	+6	42	
7	IZK Khemisset	30	10	12	8	24	23	+1	42	
8	Jeunesse Massira	30	8	13	9	21	21	0	37	
9	Hassania Agadir	30	8	12	10	22	23	−1	36	
10	Mouloudia Oujda	30	8	12	10	25	35	−10	36	
11	Raja CA	30	7	14	9	23	20	+3	35	2007–08 Arab Champions League
12	Olympique Safi	30	7	11	12	22	31	−9	32	
13	CODM Meknès	30	6	13	11	17	24	−7	31	
14	Maghreb Fez	30	7	8	15	19	34	−15	29	
15	IR Tanger	30	5	12	13	21	30	−9	27	Relegation to GNF 2
16	AS Salé	30	3	11	16	21	42	−21	20	Relegation to GNF 2

Source: rsssf.com

==== Matches ====
Date	Opponents	Venue	Result	Scorers	Report
17 September 2006	JS El Massira	H	1–0	Soufiane Alloudi 78'	Report
01 October 2006	AS FAR	A	0–1		Report
8 October 2006	Olympique Safi	H	2–1	Hassan Tair 46' Jalal Jbile 67'	Report
5 November 2006	Kawkab Marrakech	A	1–1	Hassan Tair 57'	Report
8 November 2006	Olympique Khouribga	A	0–1		Report
12 November 2006	Wydad AC	H	0–1		Report
22 November 2006	Ittihad Tanger	H	1–0	Mouhcine Iajour 50'	Report
29 November 2006	COD Meknès	A	0–1		Report
3 December 2006	AS Salé	A	0–1		Report
9 December 2006	Difaâ El Jadidi	H	0–0		Report
13 December 2006	Hassania Agadir	H	1–1	Jesús Gómez 21'	Report
17 December 2006	IZ Khémisset	A	0–0		Report
23 December 2006	MC Oujda	A	0–0		Report
27 December 2006	Moghreb Tétouan	H	0–0		Report
7 January 2007	Maghreb AS	A	0–1		Report
14 January 2007	JS El Massira	A	0–0		Report
27 January 2007	Olympique Safi	A	0–0		Report
3 February 2007	Olympique Khouribga	H	0–0		Report
18 February 2007	Wydad AC	A	1–1	Jonathan Laurens 66'	Report
24 February 2007	AS FAR	H	0–0		Report
4 March 2007	Kawkab Marrakech	H	1–1	Soufiane Alloudi 7'	Report
1 April 2007	Ittihad Tanger	A	0–1		Report
08 April 2007	COD Meknès	H	3–1	Ousman Jallow 65' (pen.) 82' (pen.) 90+10'	Report
15 April 2007	Hassania Agadir	A	0–1		Report
21 April 2007	AS Salé	H	1–0	Soufiane Alloudi 14'	Report
28 April 2007	Difaâ El Jadidi	A	1–1	Soufiane Alloudi 20'	Report
5 May 2007	IZ Khémisset	H	1–1	Hicham Misbah 18'	Report
13 May 2007	MC Oujda	H	5–1	Soufiane Alloudi 11' 18' 23' 26' Mouhcine Iajour 61'	Report
19 May 2007	Moghreb Tétouan	A	1–2	Soufiane Alloudi 51' (pen.)	Report
26 May 2007	Maghreb AS	H	3–0	Ousman Jallow 2' Soufiane Alloudi 41' 90' (pen.)	Report

=== Throne Cup ===
Date	Round	Opponents	Venue	Result	Scorers	Report
11/02/2007	Round of 32	ASOFP Casablanca	A	4–0	Jesús Gómez 7', Hassan Tair 15', Jonathan Laurens 54', Mohcine Iajour 62'	Report
17/03/2007	Round of 16	Olympique Marrakech	A	1–0	Soufiane Alloudi 70'	Report
20/10/2007	Quarter-finals	Wydad AC	A	0–2	-	Report

=== Arab Champions League ===
==== Round of 32 ====
13 September 2006	Raja CA (Morocco)	8–0	(Palestine) Markaz Tulkarem	Mohammedia
18:00	Tajeddine 2'; Chakhsi 25' 42'; Tair 25'; Aboucherouane 48' 74'; Misbah 64'; Alloudi 86'	Report		Stadium: El Bachir Stadium

20 September 2006	Markaz Tulkarem (Palestine)	0–6	(Morocco) Raja CA	Mohammedia
18:00		Report	Alloudi 2' 8' 25' 47'; Jbile 18' 45+2'	Stadium: El Bachir Stadium

==== Round of 16 ====
19 November 2006	Al-Ahli FC (Saudi Arabia)	1–1	(Morocco) Raja CA	Djedda
18:00	Mouath 44'	Report	Badra 52' (o.g.)	Stadium: King Abdullah Sports City Stadium; Attendance: 10000

26 November 2006	Raja CA (Morocco)	3–3	(Saudi Arabia) Al-Ahli FC	Rabat
18:00	Jrindou 44'; Chkilit 60'; Daoudi 64'	Report	Mouath 35' 50'; Mudraj 79'	Stadium: Moulay Abdellah Stadium; Attendance: 15000

== Squad information ==
=== Goals ===
Includes all competitive matches. The list is sorted alphabetically by surname when total goals are equal.

Rank	Pos.	Player	Botola	Throne Cup	Arab Champions League	Total
1	FW	(Morocco) Soufiane Alloudi	11	1	5	17
2	FW	(Morocco) Hassan Tair	2	1	1	4
3	FW	(The Gambia) Ousman Jallow	4	0	0	4
4	FW	(Morocco) Mouhcine Iajour	2	1	0	3
5	FW	(Morocco) Jalal Jbile	1	0	2	3
6	FW	(Venezuela) Jesús Gómez	1	1	0	2
7	DF	(Morocco) Abdelouahed Chakhsi	0	0	2	2
8	FW	(Morocco) Hicham Aboucherouane	0	0	2	2
9	FW	(Venezuela) Jonathan Laurens	1	1	0	2
10	MF	(Morocco) Hicham Misbah	1	0	1	2
11	DF	(Morocco) Sami Tajeddine	0	0	2	2
12	DF	(Morocco) Abdellatif Jrindou	0	0	1	1
13	MF	(Morocco) Hassan Daoudi	0	0	1	1
14	DF	(Morocco) Abderrahim Chkilit	0	0	1	1
Own goals			0	0	0	0
Total			23	5	18	46
