= Abderrahim Chkilit =

Moroccan football defender

Personal information
- Date of birth: 14 February 1976 (age 50)
- Place of birth: Fes, Morocco
- Height: 1.76 m (5 ft 9 in)
- Position: Defender

Senior career*
Years	Team	Apps	(Gls)
1996–2005	Maghreb Fez		
2005–2008	Raja Casablanca		
2008–2014	Widad Fez	110	(6)

International career
2002–2004	Morocco	3	(0)
- * Club domestic league appearances and goals as of April 2, 2014

Abderrahim Chkilit (Arabic: عبد الرحيم اشكليط; born 14 February 1976) is a Moroccan football defender who played for Widad Fez.

Chkilit made a few appearances for the Morocco national football team, including a friendly match against Mali on 28 May 2004.
