= Mohamed Armoumen =

Moroccan footballer

Personal information
- Full name: Mohamed Armoumen
- Date of birth: 19 September 1979 (age 47)
- Place of birth: Casablanca, Morocco
- Height: 1.87 m (6 ft 2 in)
- Position: Forward

Senior career*
Years	Team	Apps	(Gls)
–2001	Raja Casablanca		
2001–2002	AS.FAR		
2002–2003	Al Emirates		
2003–2004	Al-Arabi		
2004–2005	AS.FAR		
2005–2006	Al Kuwait		
2007–2008	Lokeren	31	(2)
2009	Raja Casablanca		
2009	Wydad Casablanca		
2010	AS.FAR		
2010–2011	Wydad de Fès		
2011–2013	JS Massira		

International career
2002–2006	Morocco	5	(2)
- * Club domestic league appearances and goals

Mohamed Armoumen (born 19 September 1979) is a football striker who has been in the national team of Morocco.

== Club career ==
He previously played for Lokeren in the Belgian First Division.
