= Mohamed Kharbouch =

Moroccan footballer (born 1977)

Personal information
- Date of birth: 22 January 1977 (age 49)
- Place of birth: Morocco
- Height: 1.83 m (6 ft 0 in)
- Position: Defender

Senior career*
Years	Team	Apps	(Gls)
1997–2002	Raja Casablanca		
2002–2004	Hassania US Agadir		
2004–2005	FAR Rabat		
2005–2008	Difaa El Jadida		

International career
2001	Morocco	1	(0)
- * Club domestic league appearances and goals

Mohamed Kharbouch (Arabic: محمد خربوش; born 22 January 1977) is a Moroccan former professional footballer who played as a defender. He made one appearance for the Morocco national team.

== Playing career ==
Born in Morocco, Kharbouch began playing club football for local side Raja Casablanca. He helped Raja win the 1999 CAF Champions League, and he appeared for the club at the 2000 FIFA Club World Championship in São Paulo. He later played for Hassania US Agadir, FAR Rabat and Difaa El Jadida.

Kharbouch played for Morocco at various youth levels and participated in the 1997 FIFA World Youth Championship in Malaysia and the 2000 Summer Olympics in Sydney. He appeared for the senior Morocco national team in a friendly against Italy on 5 September 2001.

== Honors ==
Raja Casablanca (9):

- Moroccan League (5): 1997, 1998, 1999, 2000, 2001
- CAF Champions league (2): 1997, 1999
- Afro-Asian Club Championship: 1998
- CAF Super Cup: 2000

Hassania Agadir (1) :

- Moroccan League (1): 2003

FAR Rabat(1) :

- Moroccan League (1): 2005

Morocco U20(1) :

- U-20 Africa Cup of Nations: 1997
