= Mohamed Oulhaj =

Moroccan footballer

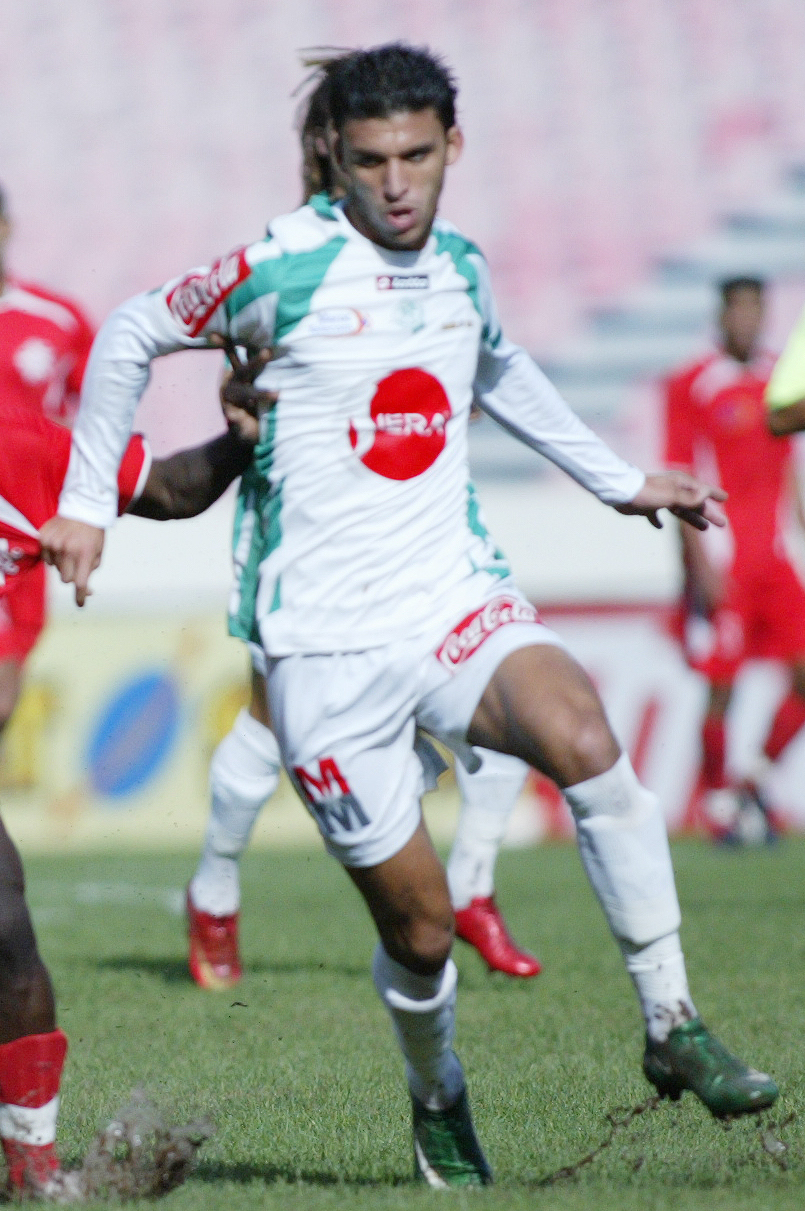
- Oulhaj with Raja CA in 2009

Personal information
- Full name: Mohamed Oulhaj
- Date of birth: 6 January 1988 (age 38)
- Place of birth: Al Hoceima, Morocco
- Height: 1.82 m (6 ft 0 in)
- Positions: Centre-back; defensive midfielder

Youth career
- Raja CA

Senior career*
Years	Team	Apps	(Gls)
2007–2019	Raja CA	342	(10)

International career
2008–2013	Morocco	13	(0)
- * Club domestic league appearances and goals

Mohamed Oulhaj (Arabic: محمد أولحاج; born 6 January 1988) is a Moroccan former professional footballer who played as a centre-back or defensive midfielder for Raja Casablanca.

== Club career ==
Oulhaj was born in Al Hoceima.

Jean-Yves Chay was the coach of Raja Casablanca when Oulhaj played his first official match with the team on 22 September 2007 against Olympique Khouribga in Complexe OCP. Oulhaj was only 19 years old and was chosen as a starter.

On 19 October 2008, he scored his first goal in his professional career during a 5–0 winning match against Chabab Massira.

== International career ==
After Oulhaj's great performances with Raja Casablanca on the season of 2007–08, the former national coach Fathi Jamal call him firstly to represent Morocco against Ethiopia for the 2010 FIFA World Cup qualification but he didn't have a chance to play.

On 14 June 2008, he made his first match with the team in Kigali against Rwanda when Morocco lost 3–1. Oulhaj had started the match and was replaced by Hicham Aboucherouane in the 36th minute.

== Career statistics ==
As of 9 November 2010

Club	Season	League		Cup		Africa		Total	
Club	Season	Apps	Goals	Apps	Goals	Apps	Goals	Apps	Goals
Raja Casablanca	2007–08	28	0	3	0	–		31	0
Raja Casablanca	2008–09	28	1	1	0	–		29	1
Raja Casablanca	2009–10	30	0	1	0	4	0	35	0
Raja Casablanca	2010–11	9	0	0	0	0	0	9	0
Raja Casablanca	Total	95	1	5	0	4	0	104	1
Career Total		95	1	5	0	4	0	104	1

== Honours ==
Raja Casablanca

- Botola: 2008–09, 2010–11, 2012–13
- Coupe du Trône: 2012, 2017
- CAF Confederation Cup: 2018
- CAF Super Cup: 2019

Individual

- Eleven of Gold best defensive midfielder: 2007–08
- Eleven of Gold best centre-back: 2008–09
