= Jonathan Laurens =

Venezuelan footballer (born 1977)

Personal information
- Full name: Jonathan Laurens Pérez
- Date of birth: August 2, 1977 (age 49)
- Place of birth: Caracas, Venezuela
- Height: 1.78 m (5 ft 10 in)
- Position: Midfielder

Senior career*
Years	Team	Apps	(Gls)
1996–1998	Carabobo		
1998–2001	Deportivo Italchacao		
2001–2003	Trujillanos		
2003–2006	Carabobo		
2006–2007	Raja Casablanca		
2007–2008	Al Ittihad		
2008–2009	Mineros		
2009–2011	Carabobo		
2011–2013	Aragua		
- * Club domestic league appearances and goals as of July 6, 2007

Jonathan Laurens Pérez (born August 2, 1977 in Caracas) is a retired Venezuelan football striker.

== Club career ==
Laurens previously played for Raja Casablanca, joining from Carabobo FC.
