= Hafid Abdessadek =

Moroccan footballer

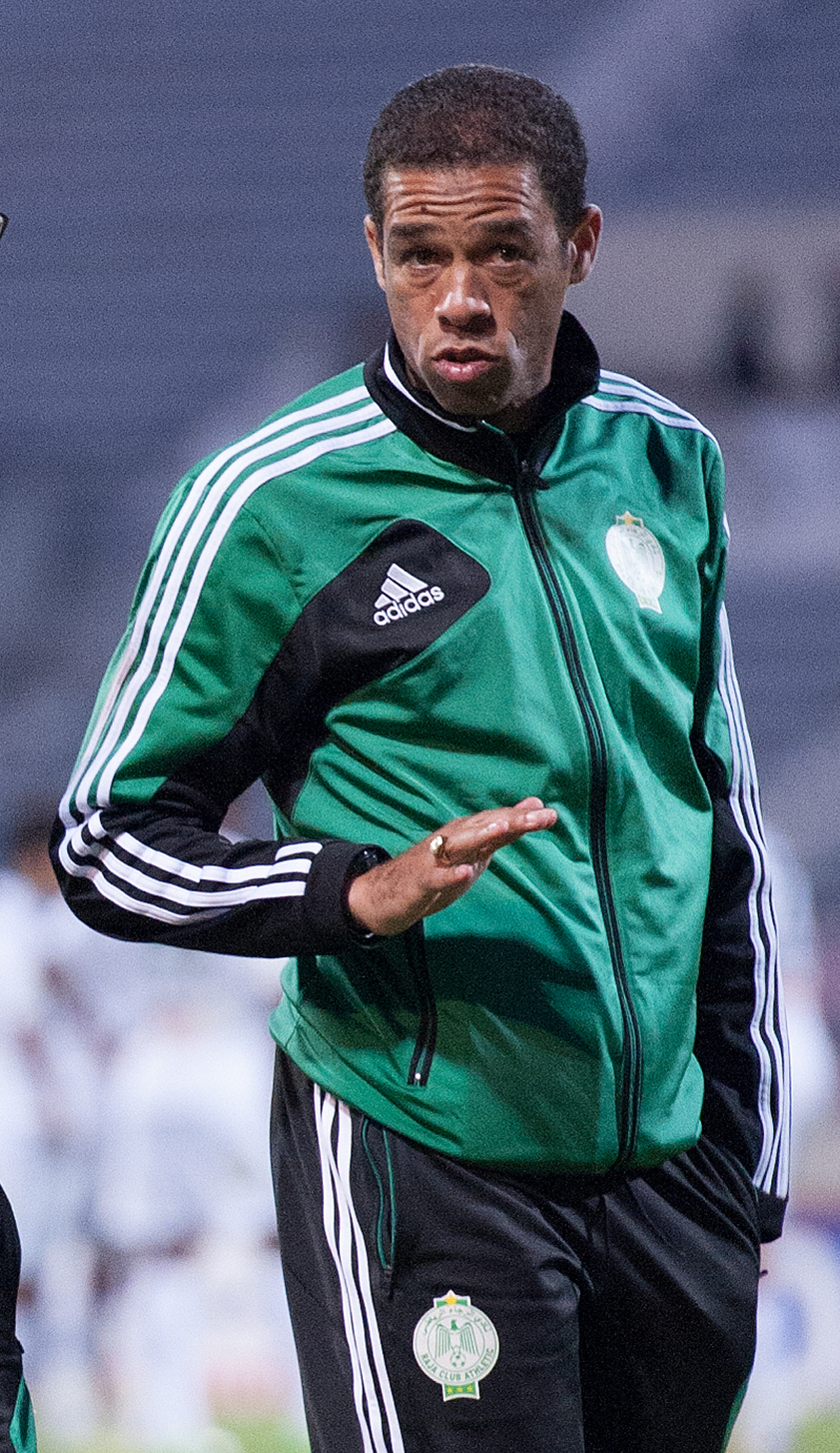

Senior career*
| Years | Team | Apps | (Gls) |
- Raja Casablanca
- FAR Rabat
- OC Safi
- MAS Fez

International career
- Morocco
- * Club domestic league appearances and goals

Hafid Abdessadak (born 4 February 1974 or 24 February 1974) is a Moroccan former footballer. Abdessadak has played for Raja Casablanca, FAR Rabat, OC Safi and MAS Fez. He represented Morocco four times and was selected for the 2006 Africa Cup of Nations.
