= Said Fettah =

Moroccan footballer (born 1986)

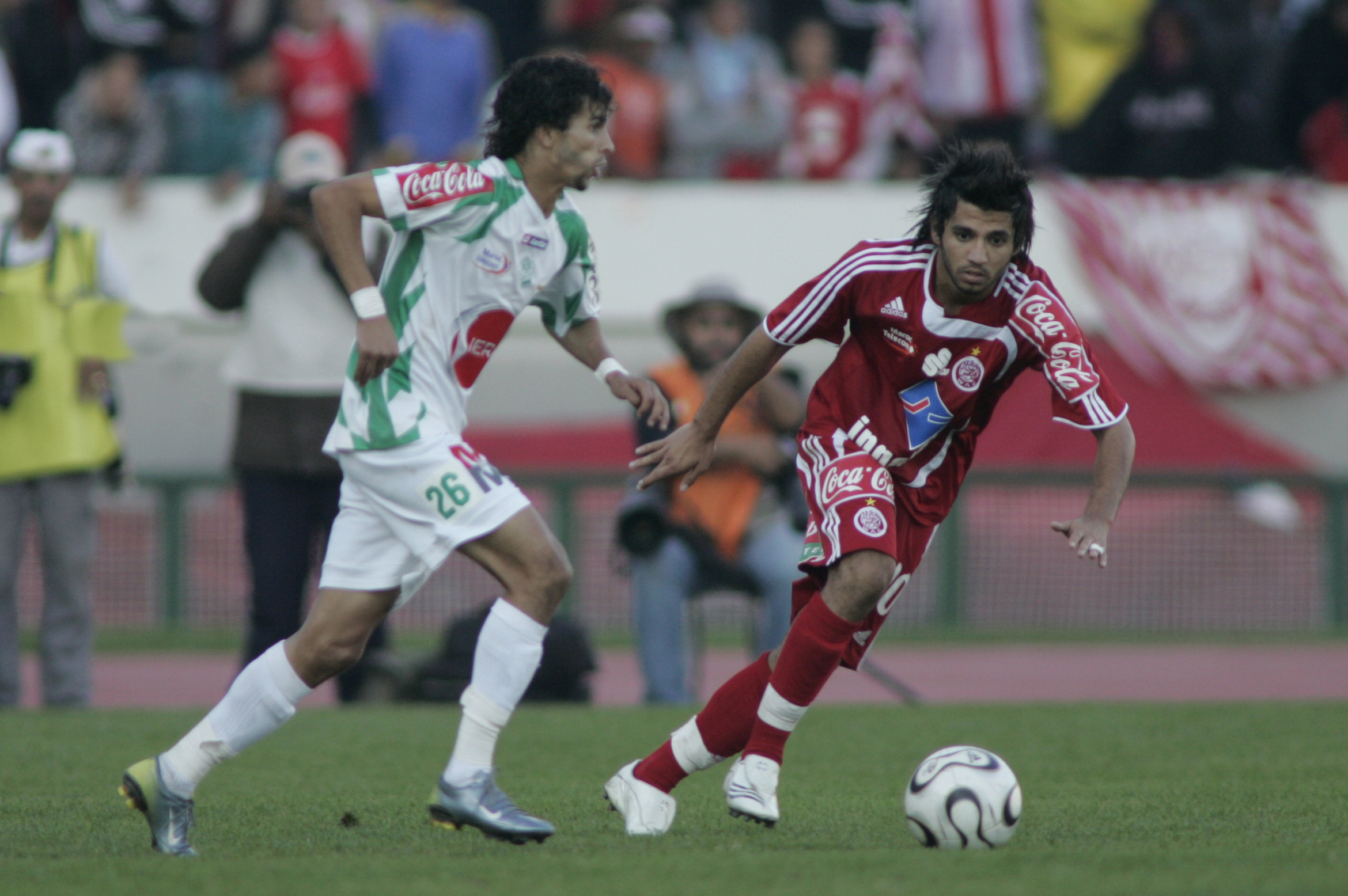
- Fettah with Raja Casablanca in 2008

Personal information
- Full name: Said Fettah
- Date of birth: 15 January 1986 (age 40)
- Place of birth: Casablanca, Morocco
- Height: 1.67 m (5 ft 6 in)
- Position: Midfielder

Youth career
- 1996–2004: Raja Casablanca

Senior career*
Years	Team	Apps	(Gls)
2005–2011	Raja Casablanca	134	(2)
2011–2014	Wydad Casablanca	113	(4)
2014–2015	Raja Casablanca	16	(0)
2015	→ Ittihad Kalba (loan)	13	(1)
2015–2016	FAR Rabat	18	(0)
2018	Widad Témara	20	(0)

International career^{‡}
2004–2005	Morocco U20	5	(0)
2008–2009	Morocco U23	3	(0)
2011–2012	Morocco	2	(0)
- * Club domestic league appearances and goals as of 12 April 2021 ‡ National team caps and goals as of October 17, 2008

Said Fettah (Arabic: سعيد فتاح; born 15 January 1986) or Fatah Said is a Moroccan former footballer who played as a midfielder.

Fettah played for Morocco at the 2005 FIFA World Youth Championship in the Netherlands.

== Club career ==
Born in Casablanca, Fettah joined Raja Casablanca at age 10 after being discovered by Fethi Jamal. Fettah made his debut for the Raja first team in 2004. He made his breakthrough in 2006 under head coach Oscar Fulloné, and grew into a starter for the side which won the Botola in 2009. He decided to leave the club in December 2010 to join city rivals Wydad Casablanca, after spats with management. There, he took part in two CAF Champions League campaigns and reached the final in 2011, which was lost to Espérance Tunis. As of 2014, he was still with Wydad Casablanca.

After a short return to Raja, a stint with FAR Rabat, a loan to Emirati club Ittihad Kalba, as well as a short stay at Widad Témara in 2018, Fettah began playing for fifth-tier club Bab Berred in 2020.

== International career ==
Fettah was first called up for the Morocco national team in 2011 to play two qualifying matches for 2012 Africa Cup of Nations. He qualified with Morocco, but was eventually not called up for the main tournament.

In January 2014, the Moroccan national football team coach Hassan Benabicha invited Said to be a part of the squad for the 2014 African Nations Championship. He helped the team to top group B after they drew with Burkina Faso and Zimbabwe, and defeated Uganda. The team was eliminated from the competition at the quarter-final stage after losing to Nigeria.

== Honours ==
Raja Casablanca

- Botola Pro: 2008–09
- Arab Club Champions Cup: 2006

Wydad Casablanca

- CAF Champions League runner-up: 2011
