= Zakaria Zerouali =

Moroccan footballer (1978–2011)

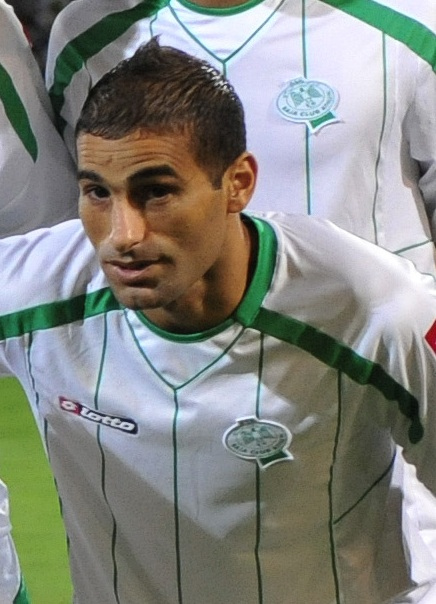
- Zerouali in 2011

Personal information
- Full name: Zakaria Zerouali
- Date of birth: 24 May 1978
- Place of birth: Berkane, Morocco
- Date of death: 3 October 2011 (aged 33)
- Place of death: Casablanca, Morocco
- Height: 1.73 m (5 ft 8 in)
- Position: Left back

Senior career*
| Years | Team | Apps | (Gls) |
| 1998-2002 | Renaissance Berkane | | |
| 2002–2005 | Mouloudia Oujda | | |
| 2005–2010 | Raja Casablanca | - | (1) |
| 2011–2011 | Raja Casablanca | 7 | (0) |

International career^{‡}
| 2004–2009 | Morocco | 2 | (0) |
- * Club domestic league appearances and goals as of 3 October 2011 (UTC) ‡ National team caps and goals as of 3 October 2011 (UTC)

Zakaria Zerouali (Arabic: زكريا الزروالي; 24 May 1978 – 3 October 2011) was a Moroccan football defender.

He played for the Morocco national football team.

== Career ==
Zakaria Zerouali was transferred to Raja CA in 2005 after his good performance with MC Oujda. He was called a few times to play for the national team and had two appearances, first in 2004 against Burkina Faso in a friendly game in Rabat and second in 2009 against Cameroon during the 2010 World Cup Qualifiers in Fez, Morocco.

In May, 2010 CAF suspended Zerouali for one year from any national and international competition because he had spat and kicked at the Malawian referee Kalyoto Robert Ngosi after the end of the Champions League game between Raja CA and Atlético Petróleos de Luanda in Luanda where they lost by the score of 1–0. After Zerouali had died, Rachid Boussairi, ex-Chairman of the Technical Commission, said: "Zerouali told me that he unconsciously did that to the referee because the African Champions League was a dream for him, and that came after the Malawian wasn't fair with Raja CA during the away match".

After the suspension Raja CA didn't extend Zerouali's contract, therefore the player stayed without a club for one season. But after the team had a lot suffered from the left back position especially with the successive injuries of Hicham Mahdoufi, the club decided on 14 June 2011 to sign a two years contract with Zerouali.

== Death ==
On 28 September 2011 Zakaria Zerouali was transferred to a hospital in Casablanca. Mr Arsi, Raja Casablanca's doctor, confirmed that Zerouali had ingested three boxes of Paracetamol in 24 hours, and that is what caused a liver toxicity. However, it was later revealed that Zerouali had not consumed the supposed two boxes of paracetamol and the final medical report makes no mention of any paracetamol-related toxicity.

Zerouali's health conditions were stable until 30 September, when some dangerous sudden changes had happened and completely destroyed the liver and caused Cytolysis.

The President Mr Abdeslam Hanat said that Raja CA had prepared a flight to take Zakaria Zerouali to Bordeaux, France for a surgery, but the medical staff in Casablanca couldn't allow the player transit because of bad and deteriorating health conditions.

Raja CA announced that Zakaria Zerouali had died on Monday 3 October 2011 at 4:45 am but later Radio Mars correspondent to the team headquarters said that he died at 2 am.

A few days after the death of Zerouali, Morocco national team doctor, Abderrazak Hifti stated in the press that the case looked suspicious and that the cause of death may have been related to medical negligence due to an inaccurate diagnosis. Other physicians would join Hifti arguing that the symptoms exhibited by Zerouali, match a Tropical disease and since these are rare in Morocco, doctors wrongly diagnosed it first as a benign influenza then as food poisoning. Zakaria Zerouali may have contracted the tropical disease during Raja CA's travels to sub-Saharan Africa for games of the 2011 African Champions League. Further investigations revealed that Moroccan teams often neglect vaccinations and preventive medical treatment related to diseases specific to sub-Saharan Africa.

No autopsy was conducted before burial, which further aggravated suspicions of medical negligence.
