= Abdelmajid Hadry =

Moroccan footballer

Personal information
- Date of birth: 1952 (age 73–74)
- Place of birth: Casablanca
- Position: Forward

Senior career*
Years	Team	Apps	(Gls)
1971–1979	Raja CA		

International career
- Morocco
- * Club domestic league appearances and goals

Abdelmajid Hadry (born 1952) is a Moroccan former footballer. He competed in the men's tournament at the 1972 Summer Olympics.
