= Abdessamad Chahiri =

Moroccan footballer

Personal information
- Full name: Abdessamad Chahiri
- Date of birth: 17 May 1982 (age 44)
- Place of birth: Morocco
- Height: 1.80 m (5 ft 11 in)
- Position: Defender

Team information
- Current team: Olympique Khouribga

Senior career*
Years	Team	Apps	(Gls)
2003–2007	Raja Casablanca		
2007–2008	Difaa El Jadida		
2008–2012	FAR Rabat	56	(0)
2012–	Olympique Khouribga	7	(0)

International career
2007–2008	Morocco	2	(0)
- * Club domestic league appearances and goals

Abdessamad Chahiri (born 17 May 1982) is an international Moroccan footballer who plays for Olympique Khouribga.

He transferred to FAR Rabat from Difaa El Jadida in summer 2008.
