= Omar Nejjary =

Moroccan footballer

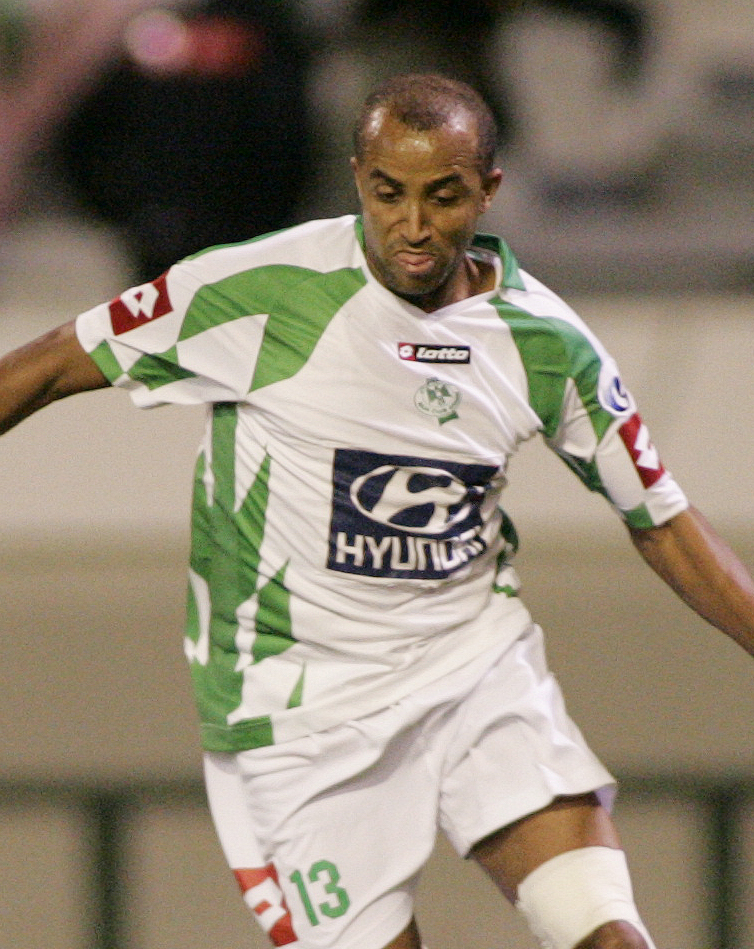
- Nejjary in 2008

Personal information
- Full name: Omar Nejjary
- Date of birth: June 27, 1972 (age 54)
- Place of birth: Casablanca, Morocco
- Position: Midfielder

Team information
- Current team: Raja Casablanca

Youth career
- ?–1990: Raja Casablanca

Senior career*
Years	Team	Apps	(Gls)
1990–2010	Raja Casablanca		

International career^{‡}
1996	Morocco	1	(0)
- * Club domestic league appearances and goals as of April 16, 2009 ‡ National team caps and goals as of October 17, 2008

Omar Nejjary (Arabic: عمر النجاري) is a retired Moroccan footballer. He usually played as midfielder.

Nejjary spent his entire career at Raja Casablanca and played for his club at the 2000 FIFA Club World Cup.
