= Hamid Nater =

Moroccan footballer (born 1980)

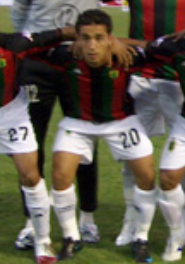
Hamid Nater.PNG

Hamid Nater (Arabic: حمید ناتر; born 30 December 1980) is a former Moroccan football midfielder who played for Raja Casablanca.

Nater played for Raja at the 2000 FIFA Club World Cup.

He played for Morocco at the 2000 Summer Olympics in Australia.
