= Sami Tajeddine =

Moroccan footballer (born 1982)

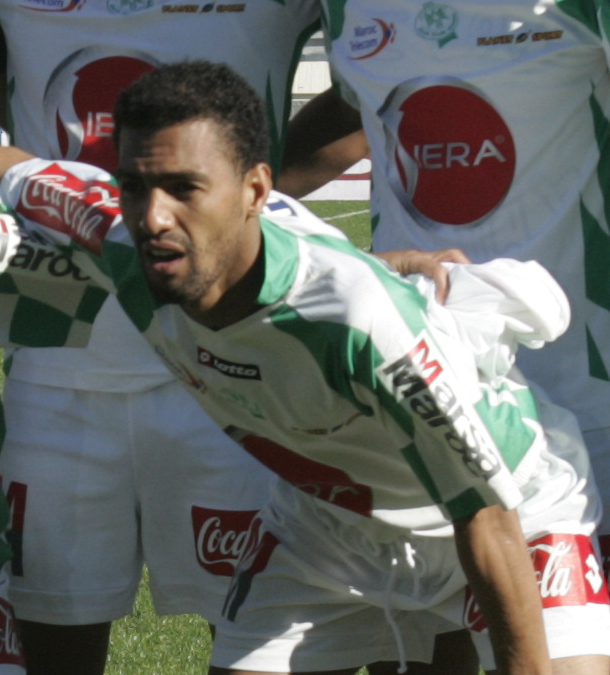
- Tajeddine with Raja CA in 2009

Personal information
- Date of birth: 10 June 1982 (age 44)
- Place of birth: Casablanca, Morocco
- Height: 1.73 m (5 ft 8 in)
- Position: Right-back

Senior career*
Years	Team	Apps	(Gls)
2000–2009	Raja CA		
2007–2008	Fujairah		
2009–2011	Olympique Safi		
2011–2013	Kasba Tadla		
2013–2014	USM d'Oujda		

International career
2002–2004	Morocco	2	(0)
- * Club domestic league appearances and goals

Sami Tajeddine (Arabic: سامي تاج الدين; born 10 June 1982) is a Moroccan former professional footballer who played as a right-back.

He was part of the Morocco national team that exited the 2004 Olympics in the first round, finishing third in group D behind group winners Iraq and runners-up Costa Rica.
