= 2008–09 Botola =

Moroccan football league season

Botola
- Season: 2008–09
- Champions: Raja Casablanca (9th title)
- Relegated: Mouloudia Oujda; Chabab Mohammedia
- 2010 CAF Champions League: Raja Casablanca; Difaa El Jadida
- 2010 CAF Confederation Cup: FAR Rabat; FUS Rabat (cup runner-up)
- Matches: 240
- Goals: 448 (1.87 per match)

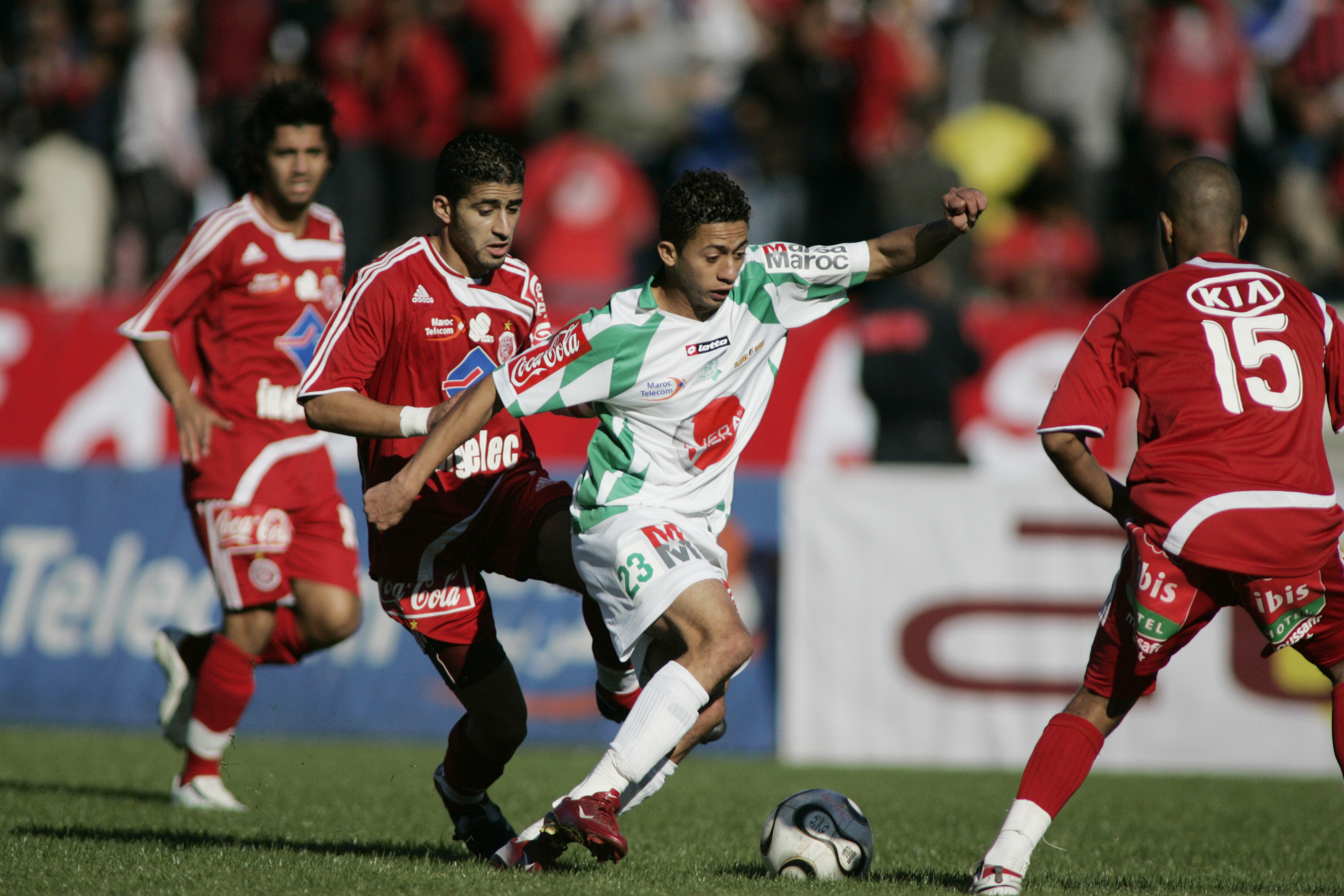
Casablanca vs Raja de Casablanca on November, 16 2008.

The 2008–09 season of the Botola, the first division of Moroccan football.

== Table ==
Pos	Team	Pld	W	D	L	GF	GA	GD	Pts	Qualification or relegation
1	Raja Casablanca	30	17	10	3	44	17	+27	61	2010 CAF Champions League
2	Difaa El Jadida	30	16	6	8	32	20	+12	54	2010 CAF Champions League
3	FAR Rabat	30	14	11	5	39	17	+22	53	2010 CAF Confederation Cup (Note: FUS Rabat also qualified for the 2010 CAF Confederation Cup as the 2009 Coupe du Trône runner-up.)
4	Wydad Casablanca	30	13	11	6	26	17	+9	50	
5	OC Khouribga	30	12	10	8	26	25	+1	46	
6	Moghreb Tétouan	30	11	8	11	29	28	+1	41	
7	AS Sale	30	10	10	10	27	29	−2	40	
8	Maghreb Fez	30	10	10	10	28	27	+1	40	
9	Hassania Agadir	30	10	8	12	30	30	0	38	
10	Kawkab Marrakech	30	7	15	8	28	31	−3	36	
11	Olympique Safi	30	6	16	8	25	28	−3	34	
12	Jeunesse Massira	30	8	10	12	31	41	−10	34	
13	Ittihad Khemisset	30	7	12	11	22	29	−7	33	
14	KAC Kenitra	30	8	7	15	24	34	−10	31	
15	Mouloudia Oujda	30	7	7	16	21	37	−16	28	Relegated to GNF 2
16	Chabab Mohammédia	30	4	9	17	16	38	−22	21	Relegated to GNF 2

Source: goalzz.com
