= Hicham Misbah =

Moroccan footballer

Personal information
- Date of birth: 1 February 1977 (age 49)
- Place of birth: Casablanca, Morocco
- Height: 1.86 m (6 ft 1 in)
- Position: Midfielder

Youth career
- 1988–1994: Wydad AC
- 1994–1999: Raja CA

Senior career*
Years	Team	Apps	(Gls)
1999–2007	Raja CA		
2007–2008	SCC Mohammédia		
2008–2010	IR Tanger		

International career
2004	Morocco	1	(0)

Managerial career
- 2020–2021: MAS Fes (assistant)
- * Club domestic league appearances and goals

Hicham Misbah (born 1 February 1977) is a retired Moroccan football midfielder.
