= Mohamed Nejmi =

Moroccan footballer (born 1959)

Personal information
- Date of birth: 1959 (age 66–67)
- Place of birth: Casablanca, Morocco
- Position: Defender

Senior career*
Years	Team	Apps	(Gls)
1976–1979	Racing		
1979–1989	Raja		

International career
1981–1983	Morocco		

Managerial career
- 2000–2002: Raja (assistant)
- 2001–2002: Raja (interim)
- 2004: Raja (interim)
- 2007: Raja (interim)
- 2009–2015: US Mohammédia
- * Club domestic league appearances and goals

Mohamed Nejmi (born 1959) is a Moroccan retired footballer who played as a defender, primarily for Raja CA, and a manager and sporting director who worked for Raja and Union de Mohammédia.

== Career ==
Born in Casablanca, Nejmi began playing football with local side Racing de Casablanca. In 1975, he moved to Racing's city rival, Raja where he would win the 1981–82 Moroccan Throne Cup and the 1987–88 Botola.

Nejmi appeared for the Morocco national team, where he helped the team win the 1982 Beijing International Friendship Cup in China.

After he retired from playing, Nejmi worked as a manager and sporting director. Initially, he was an assistant manager for Raja, and then an interim manager on three occasions. Raja won 27 of 34 matches under Nejmi's leadership. As a sporting director, Nejmi helped Raja to eleven titles.

Nejmi managed Botola 2 side Union de Mohammédia from 2009 until 2015. During this time, he focused on strengthening the club's youth system, with the club's former youth players Zakaria El Hachimi (Raja) and Yassir Jarici (FUS Rabat) excelling in the Botola and with Morocco after leaving Mohammédia.
