= Raja CA =

Sports club in Casablanca, Morocco

Raja Club Athletic
- Full name: Raja Club Athletic نادي الرجاء الرياضي
- Nicknames: النسور الخضر (Green Eagles) نادي الشعب Barça of Africa (The People's Club) الرجاء العالمي
- Short name: Raja CA; RCA
- Founded: 20 March 1949; 77 years ago
- Ground: Stade Mohammed V
- Capacity: 45,000
- President: Jawad Ziyat
- Head coach: Abdelkrim Jinani
- League: Botola Pro
- 2025–26: Botola Pro, 3rd of 16
- Website: rajacasablanca.com
Home colours	Away colours

Raja Club Athletic (Arabic: نادي الرجاء الرياضي), widely known as Raja Casablanca, Raja CA or simply Raja, is a football club based in Casablanca, Morocco, that competes in Botola Pro, the top flight of Moroccan football.

Founded on 20 March 1949 in the district of Derb Sultan, the club has traditionally worn a green home kit since inception. Raja is a well known club for the success of its football section, very popular in and outside the country. The club sits at the Raja CA Academy for training and plays home games in the Stade Mohammed V since 1955.

The club is one of the most widely supported teams in Africa. Raja were a founding member of the Botola and is one of three clubs that have never been relegated, along with founding club Wydad AC and AS FAR. The club holds many long-standing rivalries, most notably in the Casablanca Derby with Wydad AC and the Classico with the capital side AS FAR.

Raja established itself as a major force in both Moroccan and African football in the late 1980s, winning three CAF Champions League. This success was replicated in the league, which the club won seven times in ten years, including six titles in a row between 1995 and 2001. This team, which included club icons such as Mustapha Moustawdaa, Mustapha Chadili, Salaheddine Bassir and Abdellatif Jrindou, is considered by some in the sport to be the greatest African team in the 1990s. Club and Moroccan national team legend, Abdelmajid Dolmy holds the record for most appearances for the club. In 2000, Raja was ranked by CAF as the 3rd best African club of the 20th century, after Al Ahly and Zamalek.

In domestic football, the club has won 22 trophies; 13 Botola titles, and 9 Moroccan Throne Cup. In international competitions, Raja have won 9 trophies; 3 CAF Champions League titles, two CAF Confederation Cup, two CAF Super Cup and 1 CAF Cup. It is the only African team, with TP Mazembe, to reach the final of the FIFA Club World Cup in 2013 when they faced Bayern Munich.

== Crest and colours ==
=== Colors and kits ===
Green and white were used since the team's first matches in 1949. The green was chosen by the founders because it symbolizes hope and growth. It's also considered the traditional colour of Islam and one of the two colours of the Moroccan flag. White is the symbolic colour of Casablanca.

The green star of the Moroccan flag

Raja jersey was long made by the Adidas, roughly between 1968 and 1980. Raja made its first sponsorship deal with General Tire, making it the first Moroccan club to display a brand on the jersey. From 1995 to 1999, the club is sponsored by Danone and Lavazza for a year, but the club changes equipment manufacturer each season (Adidas, Uhlsport and Umbro). After winning the 1999 CAF Champions League, Raja signed a three-year deal with Hummel, the jersey was sponsored during this period by Western Union, Fiat, Café ASTA and Coca-Cola, In 2001, Raja signed a contract with the French sports management company Transatlas Sports Management (TSM) which has made Raja one of the first clubs in Africa to have a marketing commission. Kappa took over the shirt during four years. The next brand was Lotto from 2007 to 2013, then Adidas takes over again until 2017. On 13 August 2021, Raja announced the signing of a four-year contract with the Italian equipment supplier Kappa.

On 27 July 2023, Soccerhub report claims Raja has signed three-year contract with British equipment supplier Umbro till 2026.

Period	Kit Manufacturer	Shirt Partner
1949–74	–	–
1974–75	Le Coq Sportif	–
1975–76	–	–
1976–81	Adidas	–
1981–82	–	–
1982–83	Adidas	–
1983–84	Puma	–
1984–87	Adidas	–
1986–87	Adidas	General Tire
1987–88	Adidas	Chimicolor
1988–89	–	BMAO (ODEP)
1989–92	Adidas	BMAO (ODEP)
1992–95	Belgoma	BMAO (ODEP)
1995–96	Belgoma	Danone
1996–97	Umbro	Danone
1997	Umbro	Lavazza
1998	Umbro	Swatch
1998–99	Umbro	Asta; Tube & Profil
1999–2000	Adidas	Western Union; Fiat; Coca-Cola
2000–01	Hummel	Coca-Cola; Siera
2001–03	Adidas	Siera; Tube & Profil
2003–07	Kappa	Siera
2007–12	Lotto	Siera
2012	Lotto	Siera; Koutoubia
2012–13	Lotto	Siera
2013–2014	Adidas	Siera
2014	Adidas	Jibal
2014–17	Adidas	Siera
2017–18	Legea	Siera
2018–19	Legea	Siera; Infinix
2019–20	Legea	Siera; OLA Energy
2020–21	Legea	OLA Energy
2021–22	Kappa	OLA Energy
2022–23	One All Sports	1xBet
2023–2025	Umbro	1xBet
2025–	Umbro	Changan

Many football clubs around the world sport stars on their jerseys, and Raja is no exception. The jerseys of Raja have four golden stars. Each of his stars represents one of his victories in African or national competition. The first three (at the bottom of the logo) symbolize his three cups in the CAF Champions League of 1989, 1997 and 1999; the fourth (the biggest at the top of the logo) was added in 2011 following the tenth win in Botola Pro.

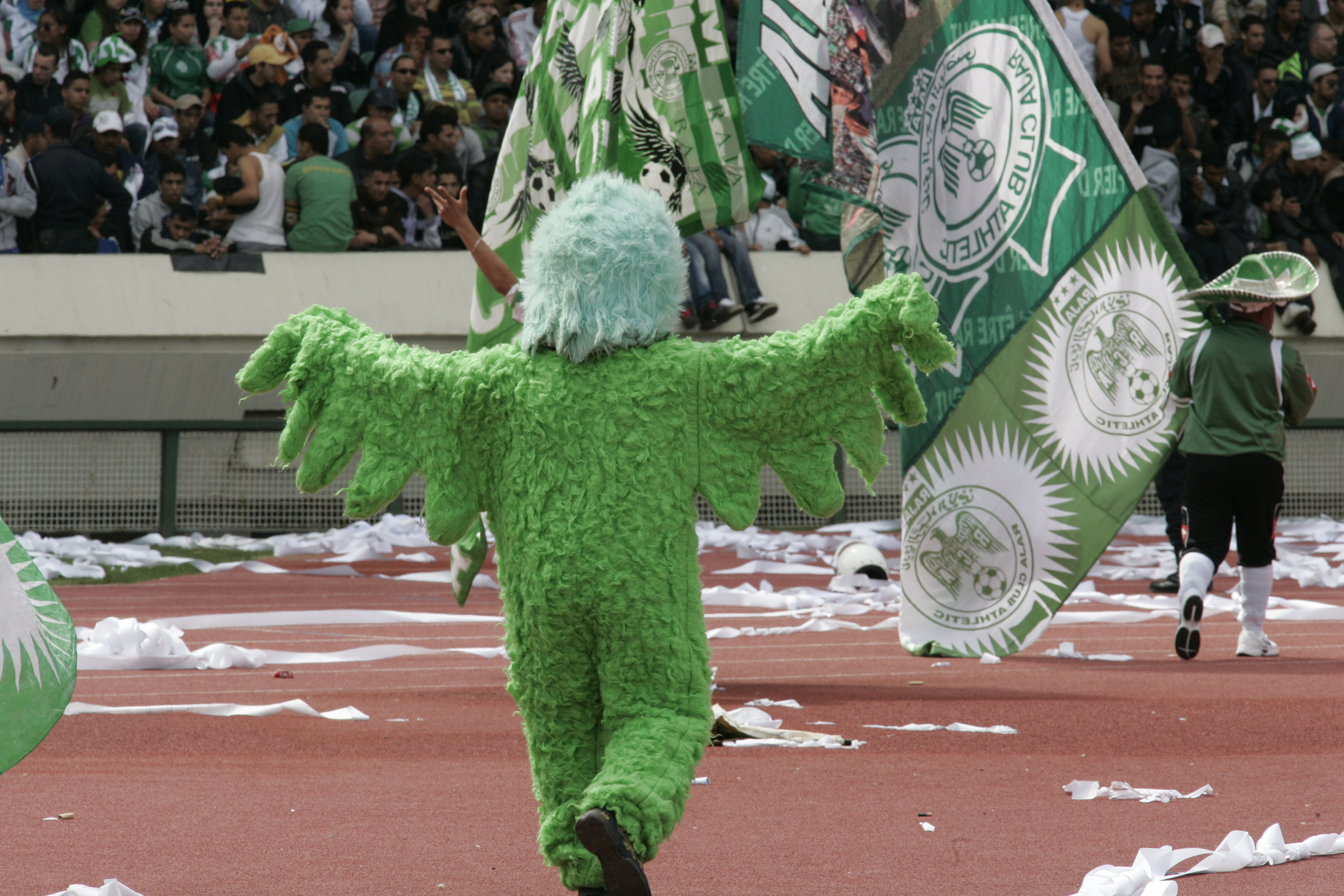
The eagle: symbol of Raja

=== Mascot ===
During the French occupation, the eagle represented for the founders the strong, prestigious and combative raptor. The animal's charisma is very representative of the history of the club, Raja was able to fly over the opponents despite the constraints. As Père Jégo wanted, the mythic figure of the history of the club, the eagle has been the club's emblem and mascot since its creation. Raja is now mainly known as Green Eagles.

== Infrastructure ==
=== Stadium ===
Stade Mohammed V (in Arabic: مركب محمد الخامس) is part of a large sports complex which contains, a 15,000-seat sports hall, an indoor Olympic swimming pool, a 650 m2 media center, a conference room, a health center and an anti-doping center. It is located in Maârif, in downtown Casablanca, 25 km away from Mohammed V Airport, and 5 km away from Casa-Voyageurs Railway Station.

It was inaugurated on 6 March 1955, under the name of the Stade Marcel Cerdan with a capacity of 30,000 seats. A few months later, after Morocco's independence, it took the name of Stade d'Honneur. In the late 1970s, in order to host the Casablanca 1983 Mediterranean Games, Stade Donor, as the Casablancais like to call it, was closed for a major renovation that increased in its capacity to 80,000. It reopened in 1983 under the name of Mohammed V, Sultan and King of Morocco that played an important role in gaining the Kingdom's independence.

In March 2016, the stadium underwent a new renovation to make it compliant with FIFA standards. The current capacity of the stadium is 45,891 seats.

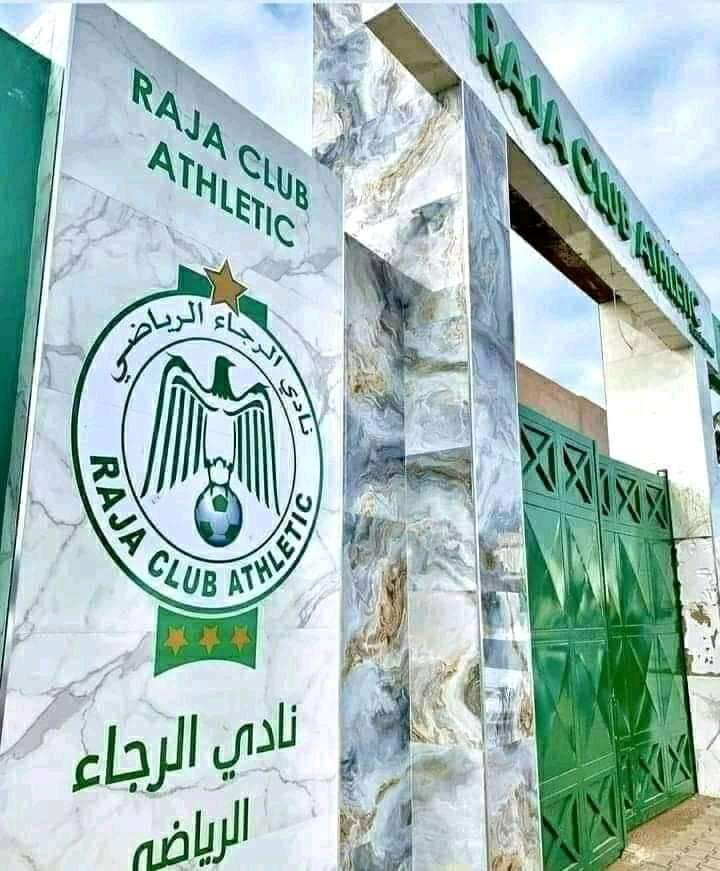
Raja-Oasis Sports Complex entry gate

=== Oasis Complex ===
Raja-Oasis Sports Complex opened in 1932 under the name of the Aviation Complex in La Cité des sports (Oasis currently), in Casablanca. After the dissolution in 1959 of its administrator, the Union sportive marocaine, Raja regained the right to use the Aviation Complex thanks to president Boujemaâ Kadri.

After being named Raja-Oasis Sports Complex, it has since housed the main training center of the A team, and the training center where the youth teams carry out their training, pending the inauguration of the club's academy. On 20 October 2023, the club announced the complete renovation of the Complex before 2025.

=== Academy ===
Raja CA Academy is the club's main training ground and academy headquarters located in Bouskoura. In March 2022, Raja CA Academy hosted the first team first training and it officially opened its doors on 22 September 2022.

Spanning an area of 7.5 hectares, the academy includes a performance center, a medical center, a restaurant and a training center with a capacity of 76 beds intended to offers to its young footballers, in association with the Raja-Oasis Sports Complex, accommodation, education and a high-level football development. The academy's facilities are dedicated to the U21, U19, and U17 teams who compete in their respective national leagues.

== Records and statistics ==
Abdelmajid Dolmy holds the record for the most games played for the club standing at 550 appearances.

Raja is the first and only team to win six straight Botola titles, between 1995–96 and 2000–01 season. In 1997–98, Raja recorded the most points obtained in a single season under the actual points scale (67 points). In the 2023/24 season, Raja won the golden league with 0 defeat.

Raja is the only Moroccan club to have played all the finals of all the competitions in which it participated. After winning the Champions League for the third time in its history in 1999, it qualified for the 2000 Club World Cup in Brazil as the first Moroccan and African team to do so. Raja is also the only African team, with TP Mazembe, to reach the final of the FIFA Club World Cup in 2013, losing to Bayern Munich (2–0).

Raja CA is the only Moroccan club that ranked among the top 10 teams in the world by FIFA in 2000.

On 11 May 2019, and after the victory against Mouloudia Oujda (2–1), Raja broke the national record for most goals scored in a single season, reaching 100 goals. They played a total of 61 games in all competitions that season, a Moroccan record.

The club recorded a flawless campaign of six wins in as many games, notably against last season's runners-up Pyramids and Zambia's Nkana whose 2–0 defeat at the hands of the Green Eagles ended their streak of invincibility at home across all African competitions going back to 1976. By doing so, Raja became only the second team to score 18 points in the group stage (alongside Étoile du Sahel) and set a new record of becoming the first team not to concede a single goal in the group stage (in the Champions League and Confederation Cup).

== Performance in CAF competitions ==
- CAF Champions League: 21 appearances

1989 – Champion
1990 – Second round
1997 – Champion
1998 – Quarter-finals
1999 – Champion
2000 – Second round
2001 – Second round
2002 – Runners-up
2004 – First round
2005 – Semi-finals
2006 – Second round
2010 – First round
2011 – Group stage
2012 – First round
2014 – First round
2015 – Second round
2019–20 – Semi-finals
2020–21 – Second round
2021–22 – Quarter-finals
2022–23 – Quarter-finals
2024–25 – Group stage

- CAF Confederation Cup: 5 appearances

2006 – Second Round
2015 – Second Round
2018 – Champion
2018–19 – Group stage
2020–21 – Champion

- CAF Cup Winners' Cup: 1 appearance

1983 – Second Round

- CAF Cup: 1 appearance

2003 – Champion

- CAF Super Cup: 4 appearances

1998 – Runner-up
2000 – Champion
2019 – Champion
2021-22 – Runner-up

== Support ==
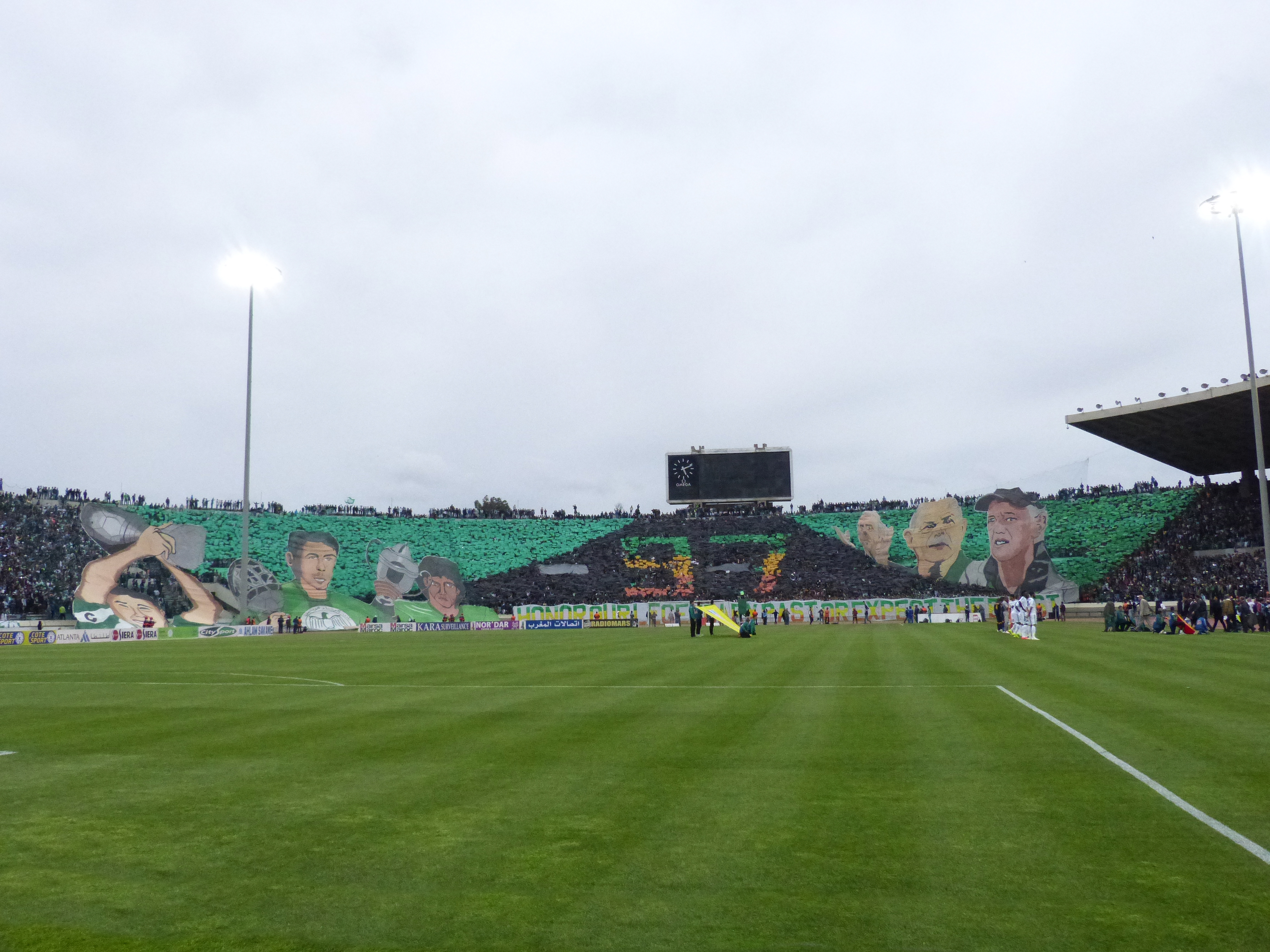
Tifosi of Curva Sud

The southern part of Complexe Mohamed V is fully occupied by supporters (ultras) of the club; it is the famous area called "LMAGANA". Four sectors of this area of the stadium can be distinguished:

- The official gallery devoted in part to the leaders and members of the club.
- The Tribune side, covered with green seats and a rostrum.
- The Virage Sud, blank marked by the presence of a mythical scoreboard.
- The Bleachers, covered with green seats and free forum.

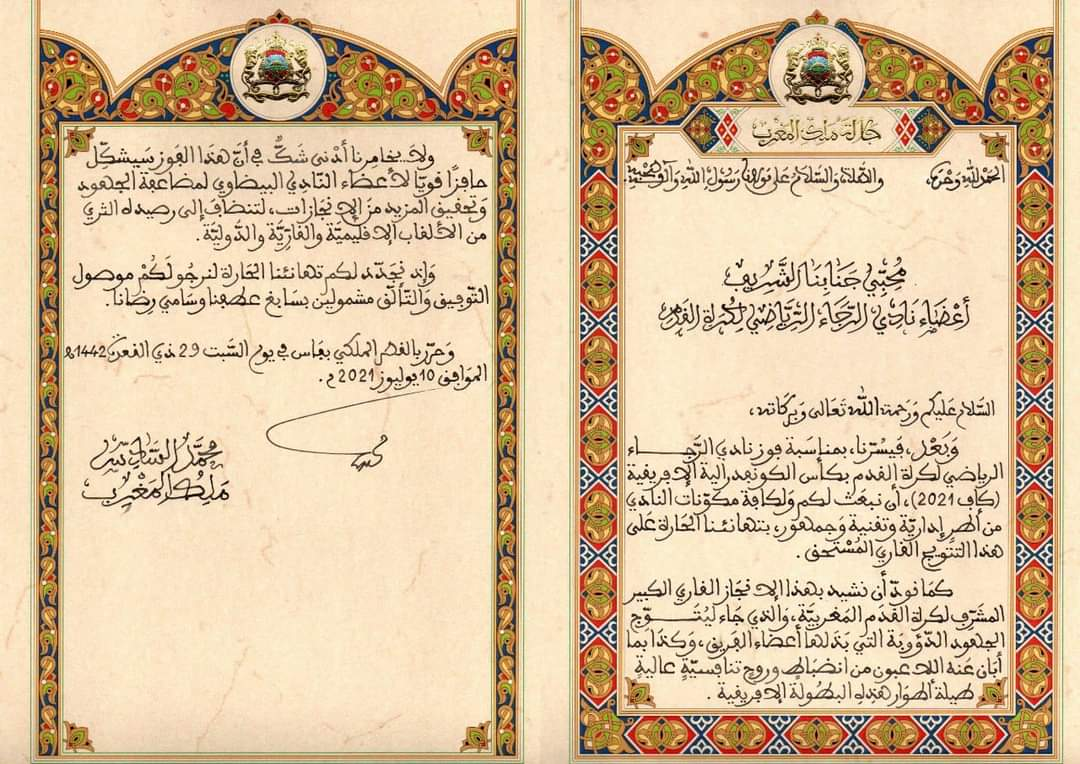
King Mohammed VI of Morocco congratulations letter to Raja after winning the 2020–21 Confederation Cup

The supporters of Raja CA are distributed in 2 ultras:

- Ultras Green-Boys 05 (First Ultras in Morocco)
- Ultras Eagles 06
- Ultras Derb Sultan

Raja is the 3rd most followed African clubs with over 8 million followers after Egyptian giants Zamalek and Al Ahly. It is as well the 2nd most followed African club on YouTube. Through its foundation created in 2013, Raja and its supporters carries out actions of general interest dedicated to children and young people to support them towards success, make them discover sport and its values and finally participate in the realization of their dreams by supporting d 'other associations.

Raja's ultra supporters are considered to be politically left-wing, and Raja supporters are known for their song "Fbladi Delmouni", that became a trend in many countries. Many of its songs are made to fight against political parties and trade unions that are not doing their job of guiding, structuring and educating. The masses that stadiums in Morocco have become places of choice for raising slogans and participating in chants with a political edge, while making it look like part of sporting fun and rivalry between fans. They show immensive support to the Palestinian cause raising their flag in many of the matches.

Raja has a large support on social media. The club ranked third place in the top six most popular football clubs on social media from Africa on 12 October 2022:

#	Football club	Country	Followers
1	Al-Ahly	Egypt	33 million
2	Zamalek SC	Egypt	13 million
3	Raja CA	Morocco	7 million
4	Kaizer Chiefs	South Africa	6 million
5	Orlando Pirates	South Africa	4 million
6	Simba SC	Tanzania	4 million

== Rivalries ==
=== Casablanca Derby ===
Green and red flags (11-04-2015)
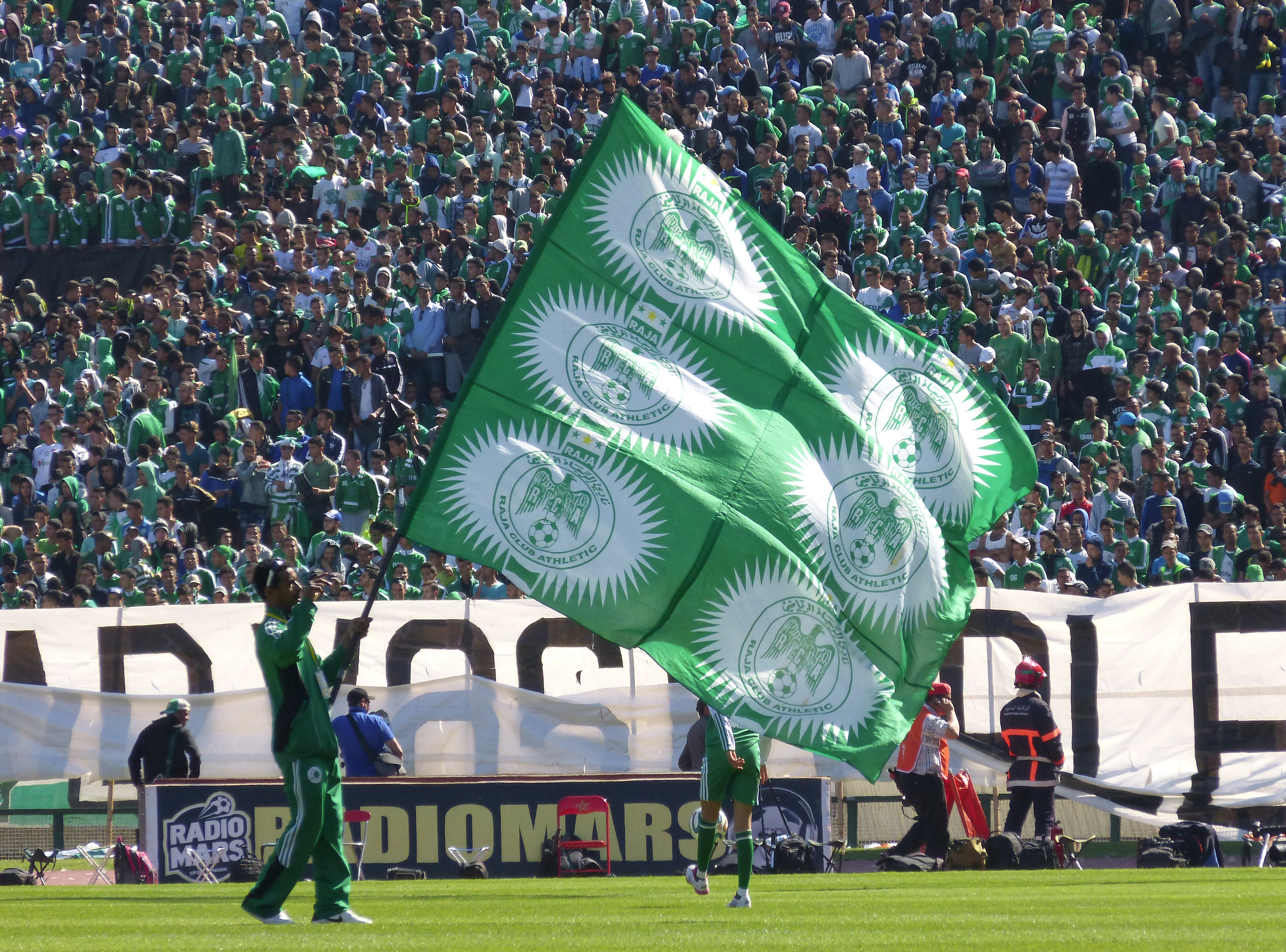
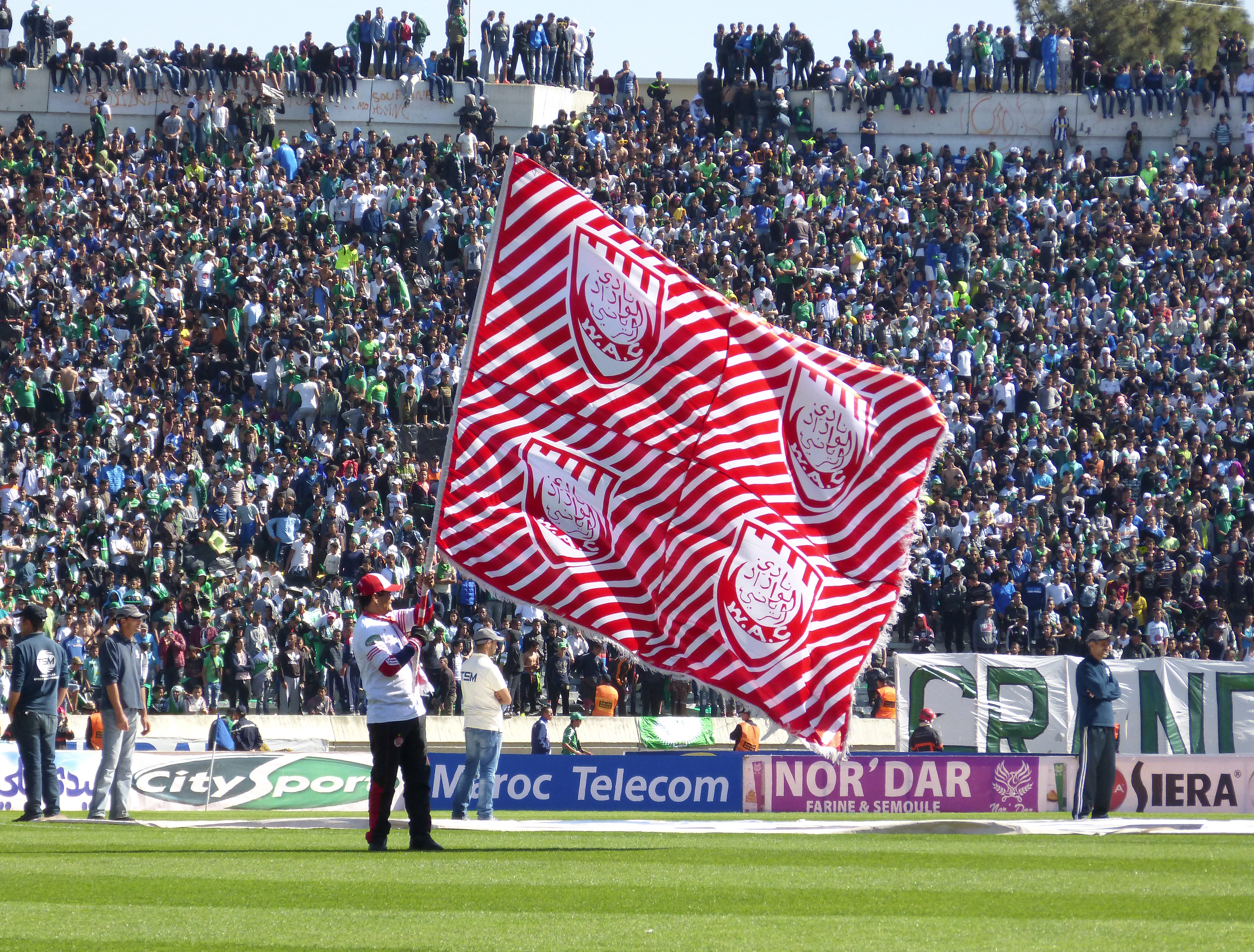

The Casablanca Derby is the intense rivalry between Casablanca rivals Raja Club Athletic and Wydad Athletic Club. It's widely considered as one of the most intense derbies in the world. After winning several titles with Wydad, Père Jégo was sacked in 1952 following a vote by players in an extraordinary assembly. He saw it as a betrayal because he was so close to them that he sometimes took them to the cinema or to eat pastries. In 1957, he was appointed as coach of Raja. On 10 February 1957 in Stade Philip, Raja won the first-ever Casablanca Derby thanks to a Mohamed Laâchir El Ouejdi late winner.

Since Botola started in 1956, the two teams are the only ones that have never been relegated. This fierce duel is accentuated by a social dimension; Wydad is closer to the bourgeoisie class, while Raja is more popular and has always been associated to the Moroccan trade union from which many of its founders and presidents belong. However, these ideological differences have faded over time and supporters of the two clubs now come from different social backgrounds. This confrontation is the football pinnacle in the Kingdom, due to its number of matches which exceeded the 150 in 2022, making it the most played confrontation in Moroccan football history, and the enthusiasm of the supporters who attach particular importance to it since it represents the opposition of the most popular and successful clubs in Morocco.

As of 18 November 2026

	Matches	Wins		Draws	Goals	
	Matches	RCA	WAC	Draws	RCA	WAC
Botola	140	39	34	67	121	108
Throne Cup	16	7	6	3	20	17
Arab Club Champions Cup	2	0	0	2	5	5
All matches	158	46	40	72	146	130

=== The Classico ===
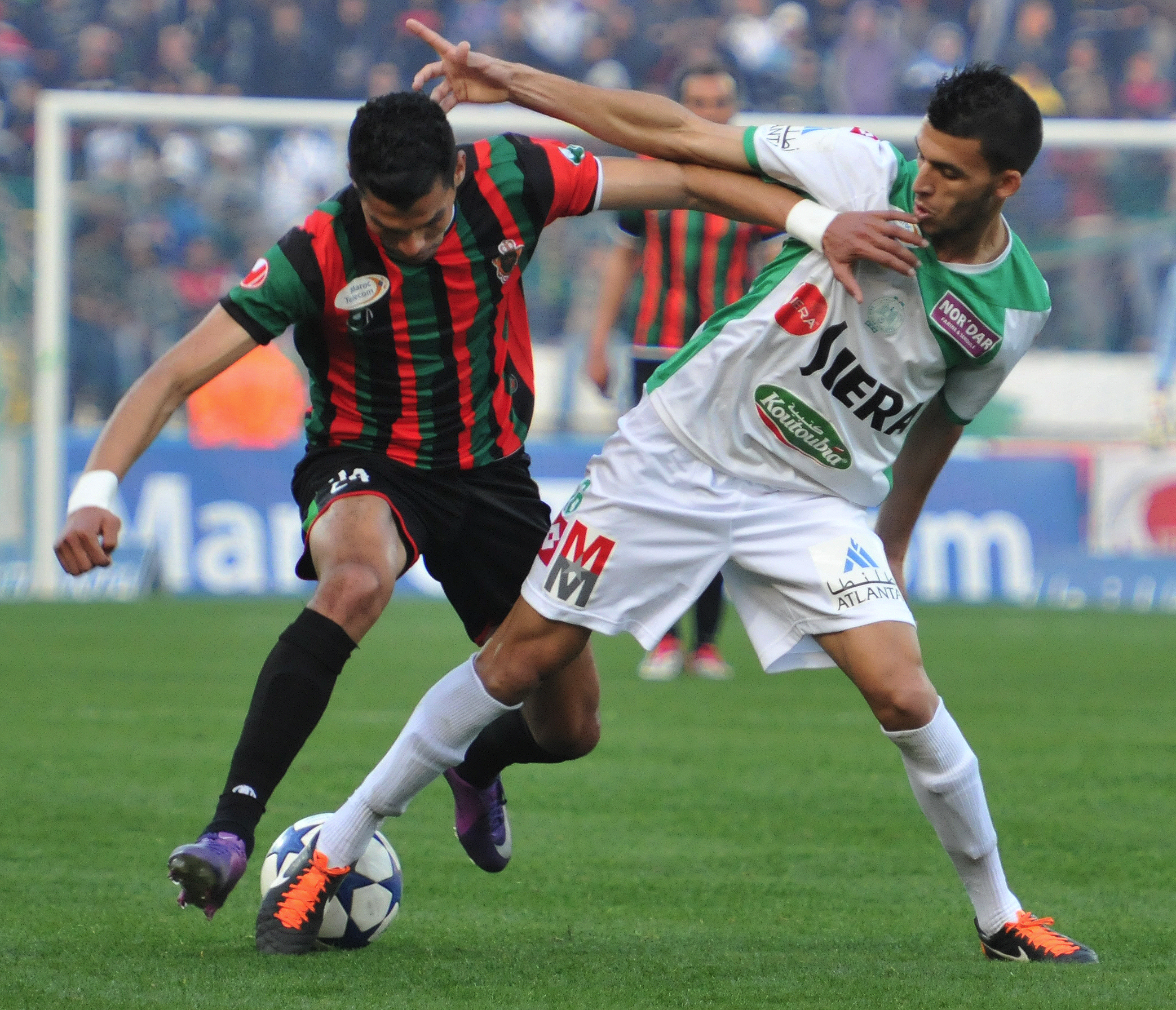
Raja defender Mohamed Oulhaj tackling AS FAR's Aziz Jounaid

The Classico is the intense rivalry between Raja CA and ASFAR. It began after the controversy of 1959–60 Botola, when the Royal Moroccan Football Federation refused to award the title to Raja, which had tied with ASFAR and Kénitra AC in points, but was ahead in goal difference. The federation decided to play a mini tournament between the three teams to pick a winner. The club protested against this decision and refused to play. The tournament was therefore transformed into a play-off match between AS FAR and Kénitra AC. Kénitra won the title, while Raja was ranked third.

In the 1980s, both teams were at their peak, with ASFAR crowned champions of Africa in 1985 and Raja in 1989, and they entertained the crowd with high level matches. In the 1990s, this rivalry experienced a big decline due to the crushing superiority of Raja, which widely dominated its rivals during this period. In 2005, the rivalry regained its intensity, when ASFAR won the title after beating Raja at Stade Mohammed V in the league's final match, and the rivalry subsequently took on a more intense dimension, especially with the emergence of Ultras groups. In the 2012–13 season, Raja won the Botola and the Throne Cup, while the capital side finished as runners-up of both competitions. In 2023–24, Raja defeated AS FAR twice in the race for domestic supremacy, first by finishing above them in the league and then by beating them in the Throne Cup final.

As of 18 November 2026

	Matches	Wins		Draws	Goals	
	Matches	RCA	FAR	Draws	RCA	FAR
Botola	133	44	34	55	120	111
Throne Cup	14	4	5	5	11	15
CAF Champions League	2	0	1	1	1	3
All matches	149	48	40	61	132	129

=== African rivalries ===
Raja CA and Egypt's Zamalek are two of the most successful clubs in the CAF Champions League, Raja winning three times while Zamalek have gathered five titles. Their most well known is the 2002 Champions League Final, in which Raja lost 1–0 on aggregate. They met again in the 2019–20 Champions League semi-final in which ended in a controversial 4-1 aggregate loss. Raja had faced Al Ahly in many occasions. They have faced each other in the 1996 Arab Club Champions Cup Final for the first time that ended in a 3–1 loss in Cairo. They met again in the 2021 CAF Super Cup, where the Eagles lost 6–5 on penalties. Raja has also many rivals in Algeria and Tunisia due to the numerous finals the played together. Raja defeated MC Oran in the 1989 African Cup of Champions Clubs final and JS Kabylie in the 2019 Confederation Cup Final. They also defeated ES Tunis in the 1999 Champions League Final and in the 2019 CAF Super Cup, and lost the 1998 CAF Super Cup to ES Sahel.

== Popular culture ==
Since its creation, Raja CA has managed to attract, under Père Jégo, many supporters thanks to its style of play that still identify it in the present, a style based on possession, movement and short passing. Nutmegs were also highly appreciated by players and supporters. They focused more on the spectacle and conserving their style of play than actually winning.

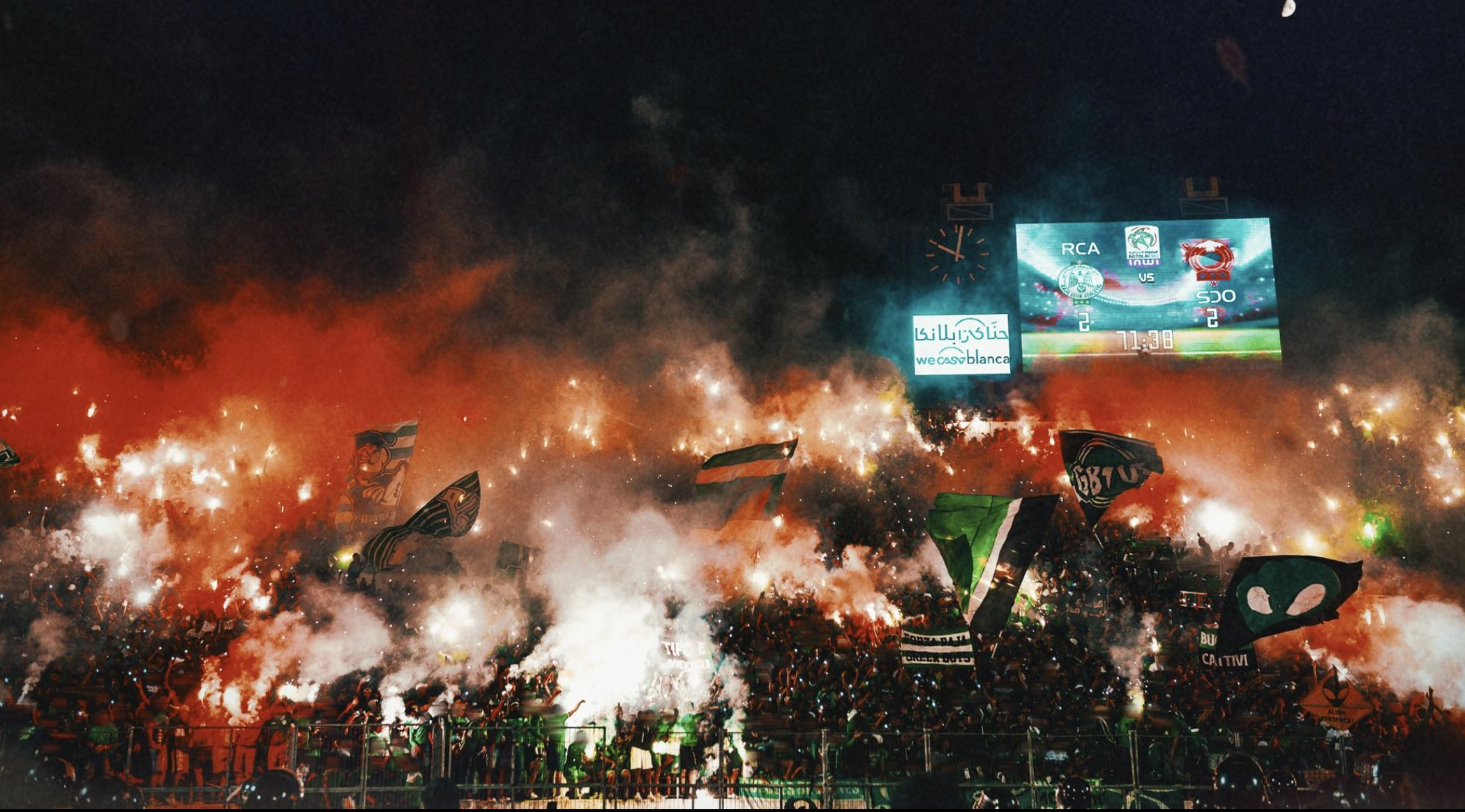
Curva Sud Magana

Things changed in the late 1980s under experienced coaches like Fernando Cabrita and Rabah Saâdane, the team began to focus more on the results while keeping its style. This development did not go overlooked by the supporters, who from the beginning of the 1990s began to regroup in the south stands of Stade Mohamed V, the Curva Sud which still gathers the most fanatic supporters. On 21 June 2005, the first ultras group in Morocco, Green Boys was created.

Raja is traditionally considered the people's club. The first supporters came from Derb Sultan, the historic stronghold of the club where it was created, but other popular districts of Casablanca like Sbata, Hay Hassani, Hay Mohammadi and Sidi Bernoussi widely supports the club.

Raja was also featured in the eleventh episode of the second season of the award-winning American sports comedy-drama television series Ted Lasso.

== Honours ==
This is a list of honours for the senior Raja CA team:

Type	Competition	Titles	Winning seasons
Domestic	Botola	13	1987–88, 1995–96, 1996–97, 1997–98, 1998–99, 1999–2000, 2000–01, 2003–04, 2000–09, 2010–11, 2012–13, 2019–20, 2023–24
Domestic	Moroccan Throne Cup	9	1973–74, 1976–77, 1981–82, 1995–96, 2001–02, 2004–05, 2011–12, 2016–17, 2022–23
Continental	CAF Champions League	3	1989, 1997, 1999
Continental	CAF Confederation Cup	2	2018, 2020–21
Continental	CAF Super Cup	2	2000, 2019
Continental	CAF Cup	1	2003
Intercontinental	Afro-Asian Club Championship	1	1998
Regional	Arab Club Champions Cup	2	2005–06, 2019–20
Regional	UNAF Club Cup	1	2015

Competition	Titles	Runners-up	Winning seasons
FIFA Club World Cup	–	1	2013

- record
- ^{S} shared record
- Friendly

Competition	Titles	Winning seasons
Cherkaoui Tournament	1	1959
Ben Bella Tournament	1	1962
International Friendship Abha Cup	1	2004
Arab Summer Cup	1	2007
Ahmed Antifi Tournament	3	2004, 2009, 2016

== Players ==
=== Current squad ===
As of 15 September 2026

Note: Flags indicate national team as defined under FIFA eligibility rules; some limited exceptions apply. Players may hold more than one non-FIFA nationality.

No.	Pos.	Nation	Player
1	GK	MAR	El Mehdi Al Harrar
2	DF	POR	Marian Huja
3	DF	MAR	Chemseddine Knaidil
4	DF	MAR	Ismael Mokadem
5	DF	MAR	Bouchaib Arrassi
6	MF	MAR	Aymen Barkok
7	DF	MAR	Mohamed Boulacsoute
8	MF	MAR	Ishak Zidani
9	FW	MAR	Ismail Khafi
10	FW	BRA	Felipinho
11	FW	MAR	Youness Dahmani
12	GK	MAR	Khalid Kbiri Alaoui
13	DF	MAR	Badr Benoun (captain)
14	MF	DEN	Younes Bakiz (on loan from Silkeborg)
16	MF	MAR	Anas Benomar

No.	Pos.	Nation	Player
17	DF	MAR	Ayoub El Amloud
18	FW	MAR	Yahya Iguiz
19	MF	MAR	Othmane Chraibi
21	FW	TUN	Adel Bettaieb
22	GK	MAR	Saad Antra
23	MF	MAR	Mohamed Al Makahasi
24	DF	MAR	Amine Khammas
27	FW	JOR	Sharara
30	MF	GHA	Michael Agbekpornu
32	GK	MAR	Yassine Zoubir
45	FW	MAR	Bilal Ould-Chikh
70	FW	MAR	Mounaïm El Idrissy
77	FW	MAR	Adam Ennafati
99	FW	NGR	Mathias Oyewusi

==== Out on loan ====
As of 15 September 2026

Note: Flags indicate national team as defined under FIFA eligibility rules; some limited exceptions apply. Players may hold more than one non-FIFA nationality.

No.	Pos.	Nation	Player

=== Notable players ===
This list includes some players that have appeared in at least 100 league games and/or have reached international status.

- (Morocco) Abdelmajid Dolmy
- (Morocco) Ali Bendayan
- (Morocco) Mustapha Choukri
- (Morocco) Said Ghandi
- (Morocco) Houmane Jarir
- (Morocco) Abdelmajid Hadry
- (Morocco) Jawad El Andaloussi
- (Morocco) Mohamed Fakhir
- (Morocco) Mustafa El Haddaoui
- (Morocco) Fathi Jamal
- (Morocco) Mohamed Nejmi
- (Morocco) Mustapha Khalif
- (Morocco) Mustapha Moustawdaa
- (Morocco) Hajry Redouane
- (Morocco) Salaheddine Bassir
- (Morocco) Jamal Sellami
- (Morocco) Talal El Karkouri
- (Morocco) Youssef Safri
- (Morocco) Abdellatif Jrindou
- (Morocco) Mustapha Chadili
- (Morocco) Abdelilah Fahmi
- (Morocco) Reda Ereyahi
- (Morocco) Hicham Misbah
- (Morocco) Bouchaib El Moubarki
- (Morocco) Zakaria Aboub
- (Morocco) Hicham Aboucherouane
- (Burkina Faso) Mohamed Ali Diallo
- (Morocco) Hamid Nater
- (Cameroon) François Endene
- (Morocco) Sami Tajeddine
- (Morocco) Merouane Zemmama
- (Morocco) Amin Erbati
- (Morocco) Soufiane Alloudi
- (Morocco) Mouhcine Iajour
- (Morocco) Zakaria Zerouali
- (Mali) Modibo Maïga
- (Morocco) Rachid Soulaimani
- (Morocco) Mohamed Oulhaj
- (Morocco) Said Fettah
- (Morocco) Mohsine Moutaouali
- (Ivory Coast) Kouko Guehi
- (Morocco) Adil Karrouchy
- (Morocco) Zakaria El Hachimi
- (Central African Republic) Vianney Mabidé
- (Morocco) Yassine Salhi
- (Morocco) Abdelilah Hafidi
- (Morocco) Issam Erraki
- (Morocco) Jawad El Yamiq
- (Morocco) Badr Benoun
- (Morocco) Anas Zniti
- (Morocco) Soufiane Rahimi
- (Democratic Republic of the Congo) Ben Malango
- (Morocco) Mohamed Zrida
- (Morocco) Mohamed Al Makahasi

== Personnel ==
=== Board of directors ===
Position	Name
President	(Morocco) Jawad Ziyat

=== Current technical staff ===
Position	Staff
Head coach	(Morocco) Abdelkrim Jinani
Assistant coach	(Morocco) Fouad Chafik
Assistant coach	(Morocco) Issam Erraki
Fitness coach	(France) Frédéric Gacon
Fitness coach	(Morocco) Charafeddine Mezzour
Goalkeeping coach	(South Africa) Wayne Sandilands
Performance analyst	(Morocco) Nabil Chamali
Sporting director	-
Head of Player Development	(Portugal) Silveira Ramos
Head of performance	(Morocco) Anwar Mghinia
First-team doctor	(Morocco) Dr. Hakim Ait Lahcen
Head Physiotherapist	(Morocco) Mustapha Jazouli
Match delegate	(Morocco) Mustapha Tantaoui

=== Presidents ===
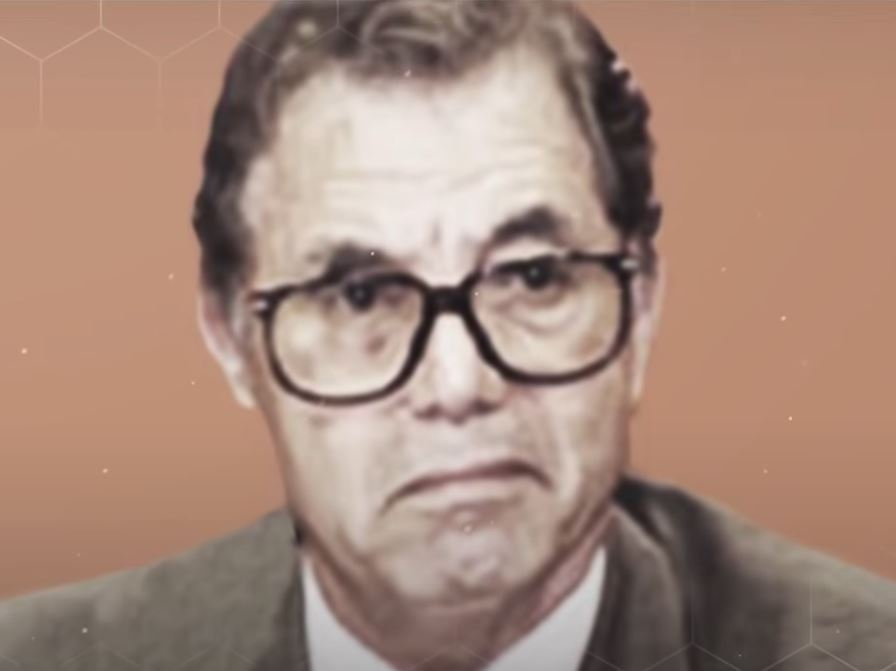
Maati Bouabid

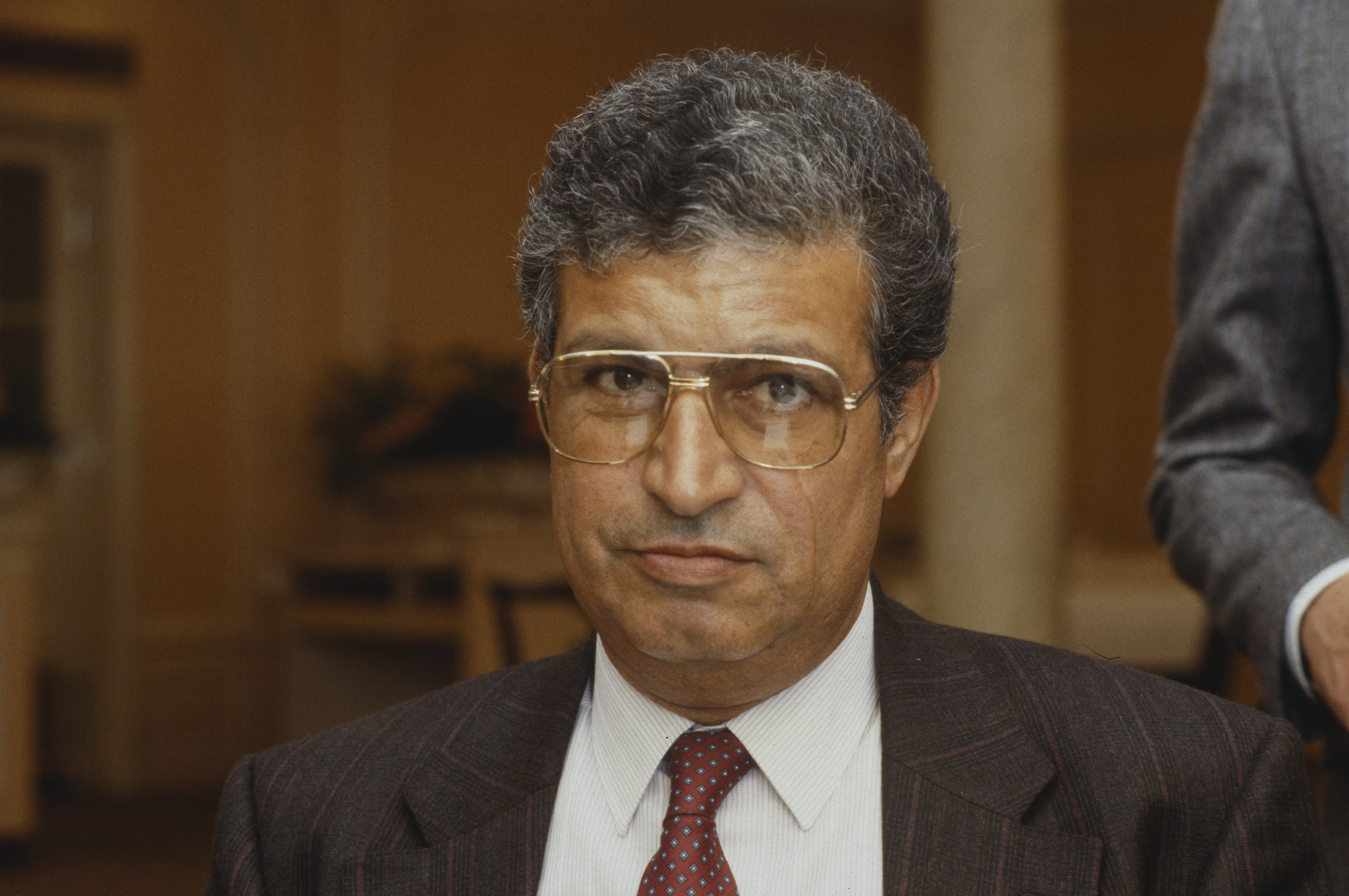
Abdellatif Semlali

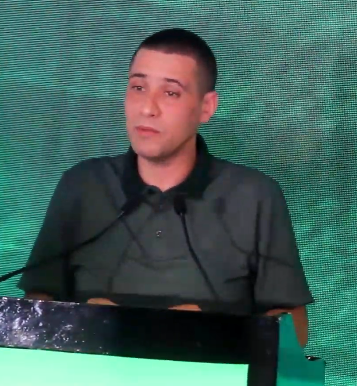
Mohamed Boudrika

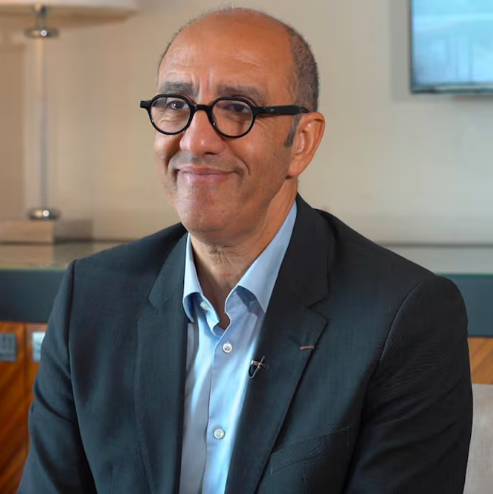
Jawad Ziyat

=== Managers ===
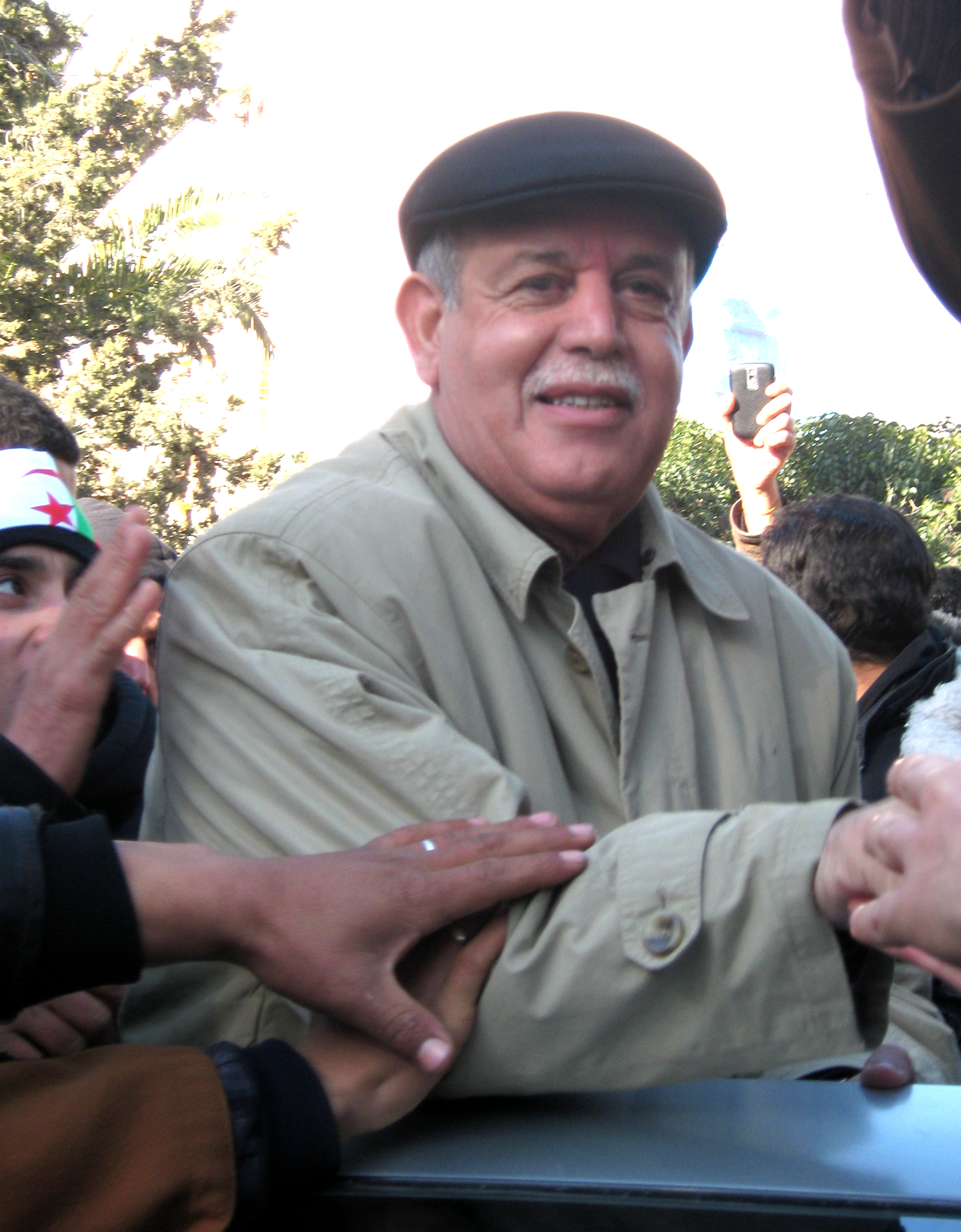
Rabah Saâdane

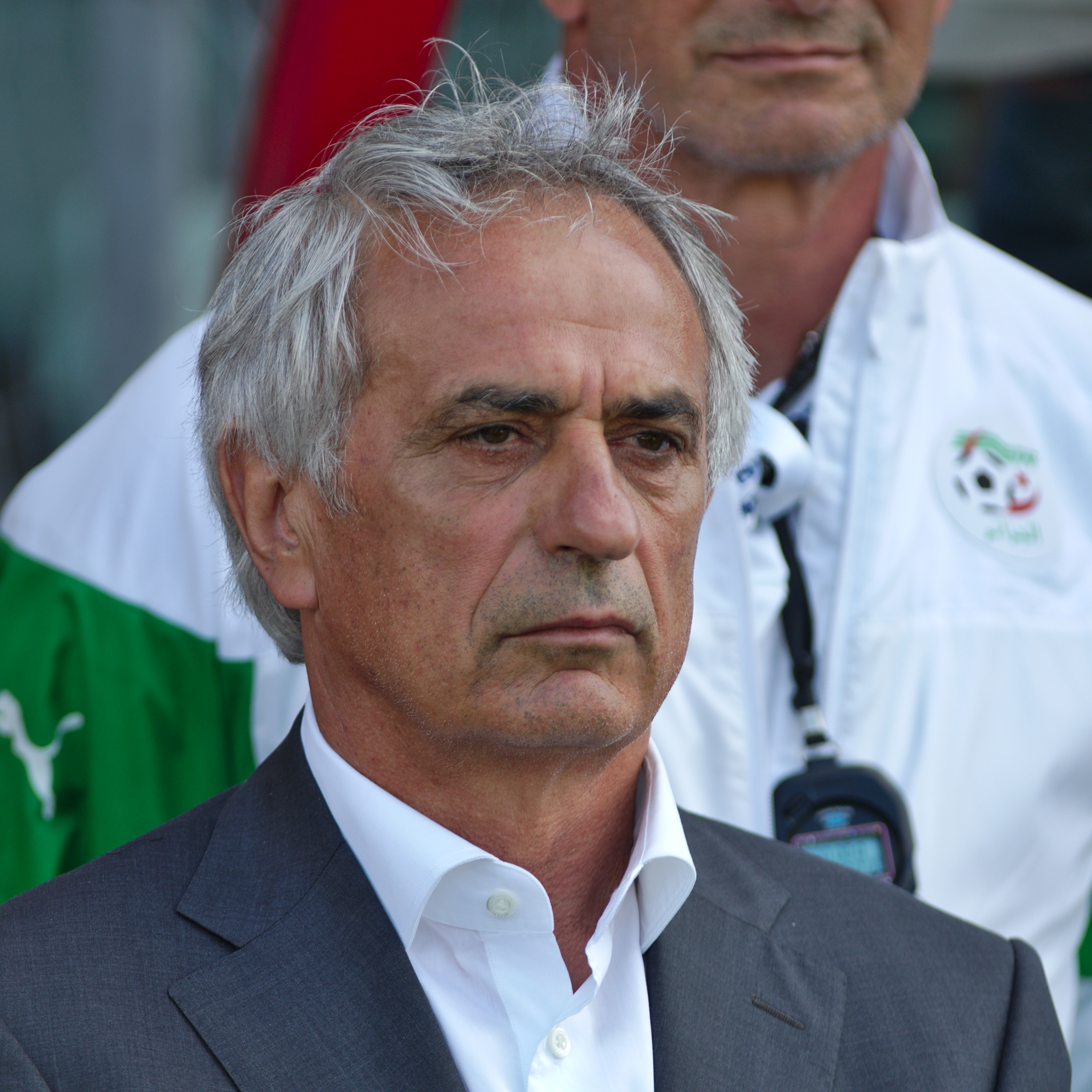
Vahid Halilhodžić

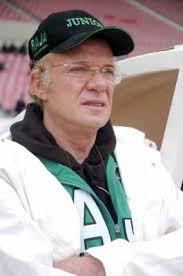
Oscar Fulloné

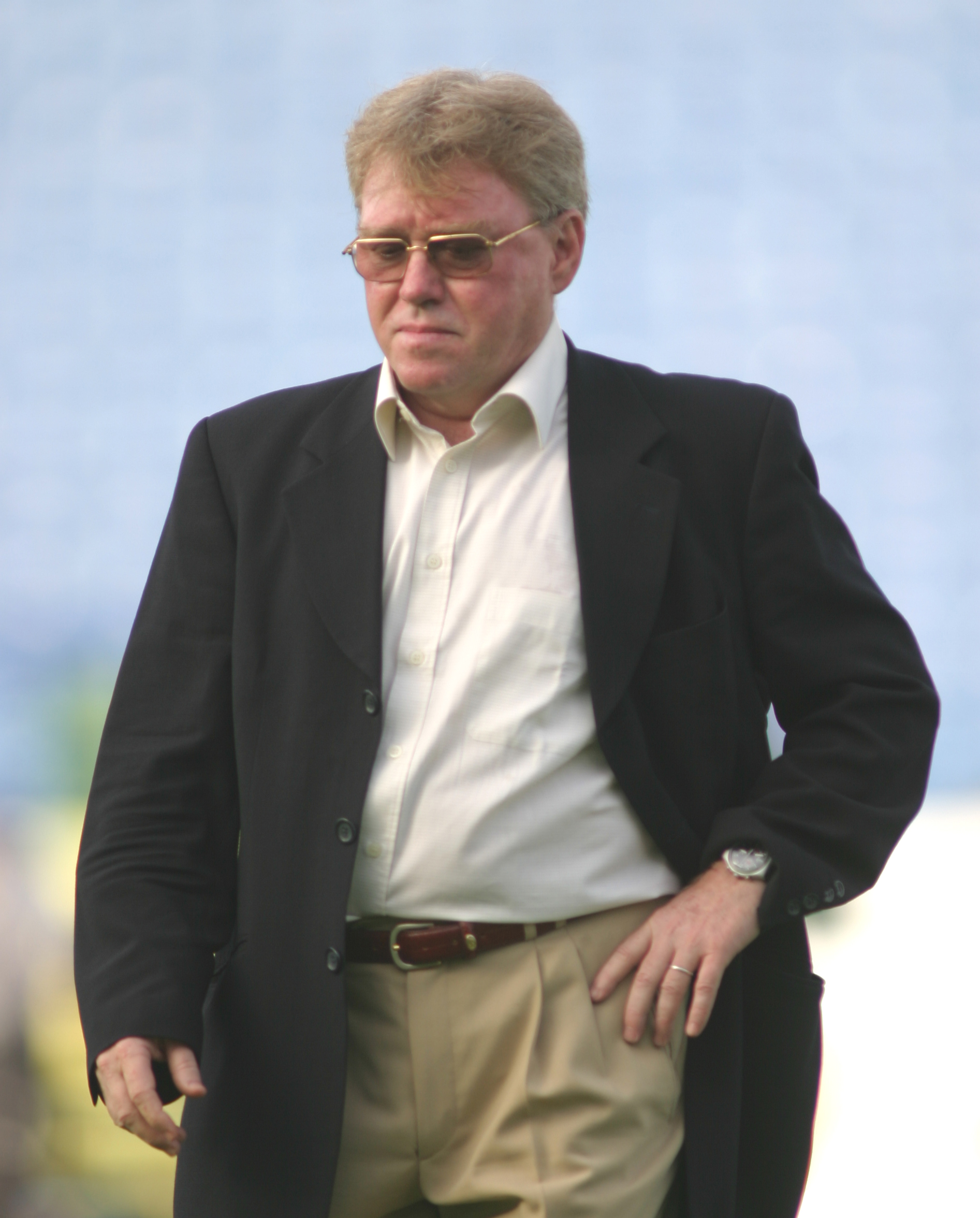
Alexandru Moldovan

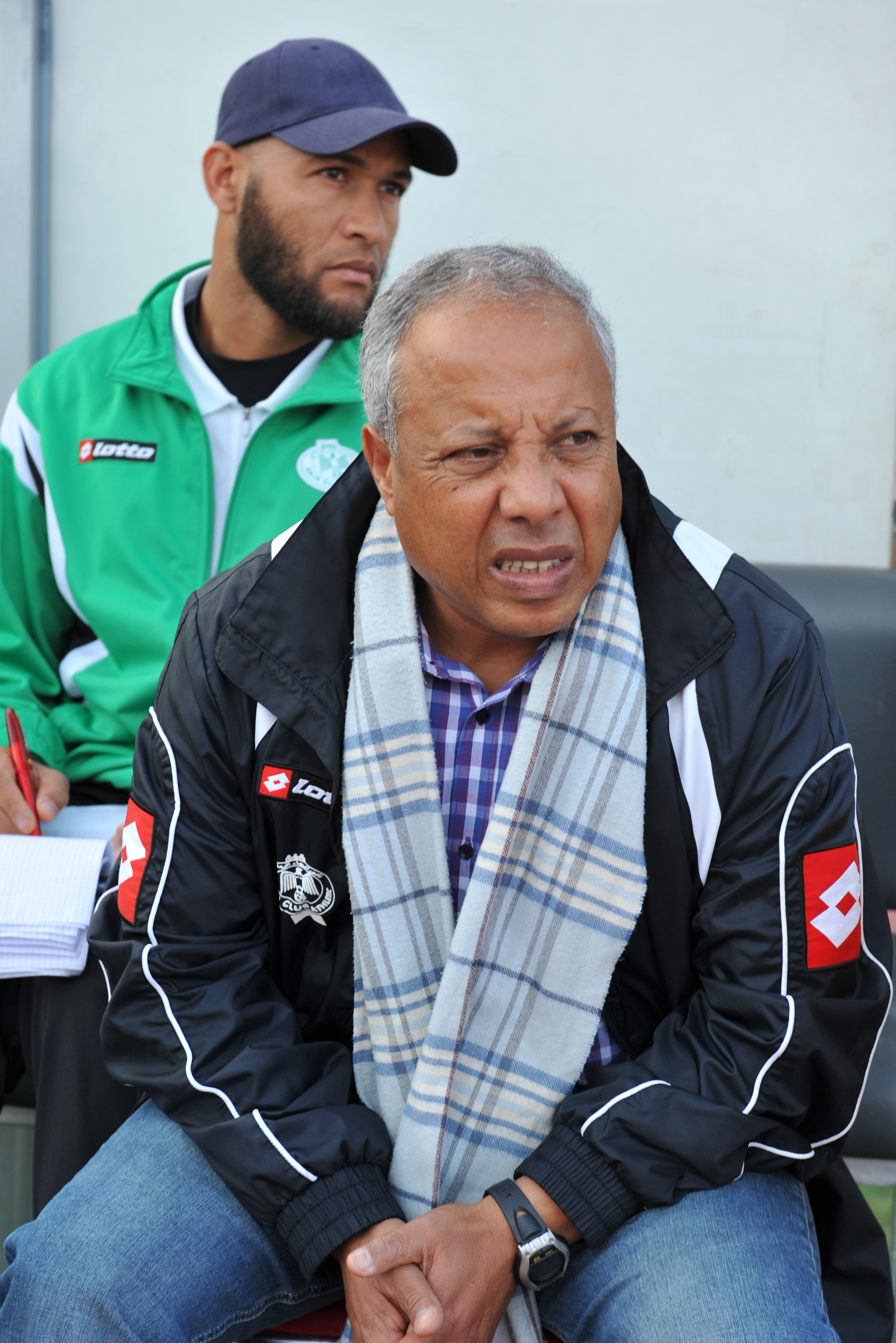
Mohamed Fakhir

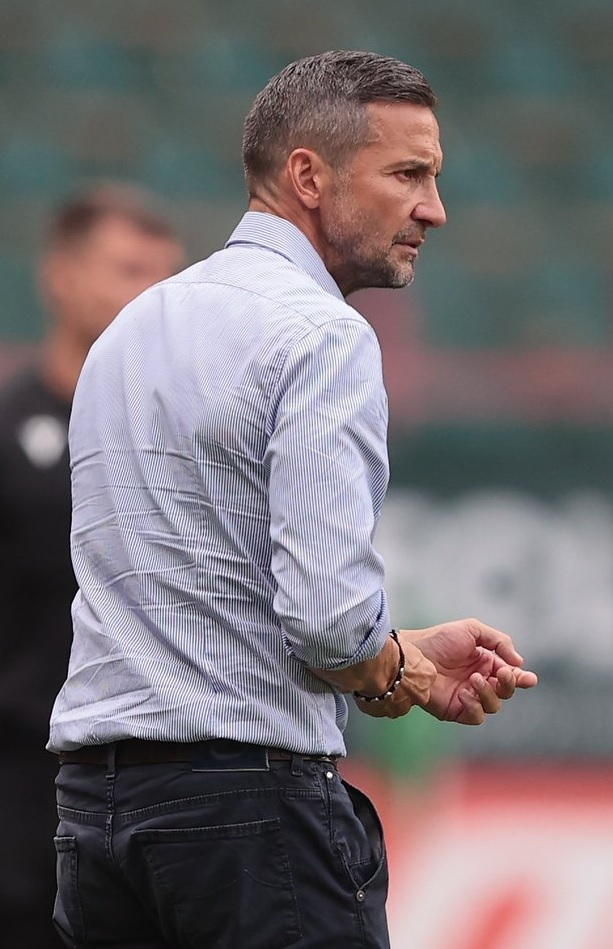
Josef Zinnbauer
