= History of Raja CA (1990–present) =

History of a Moroccan football club

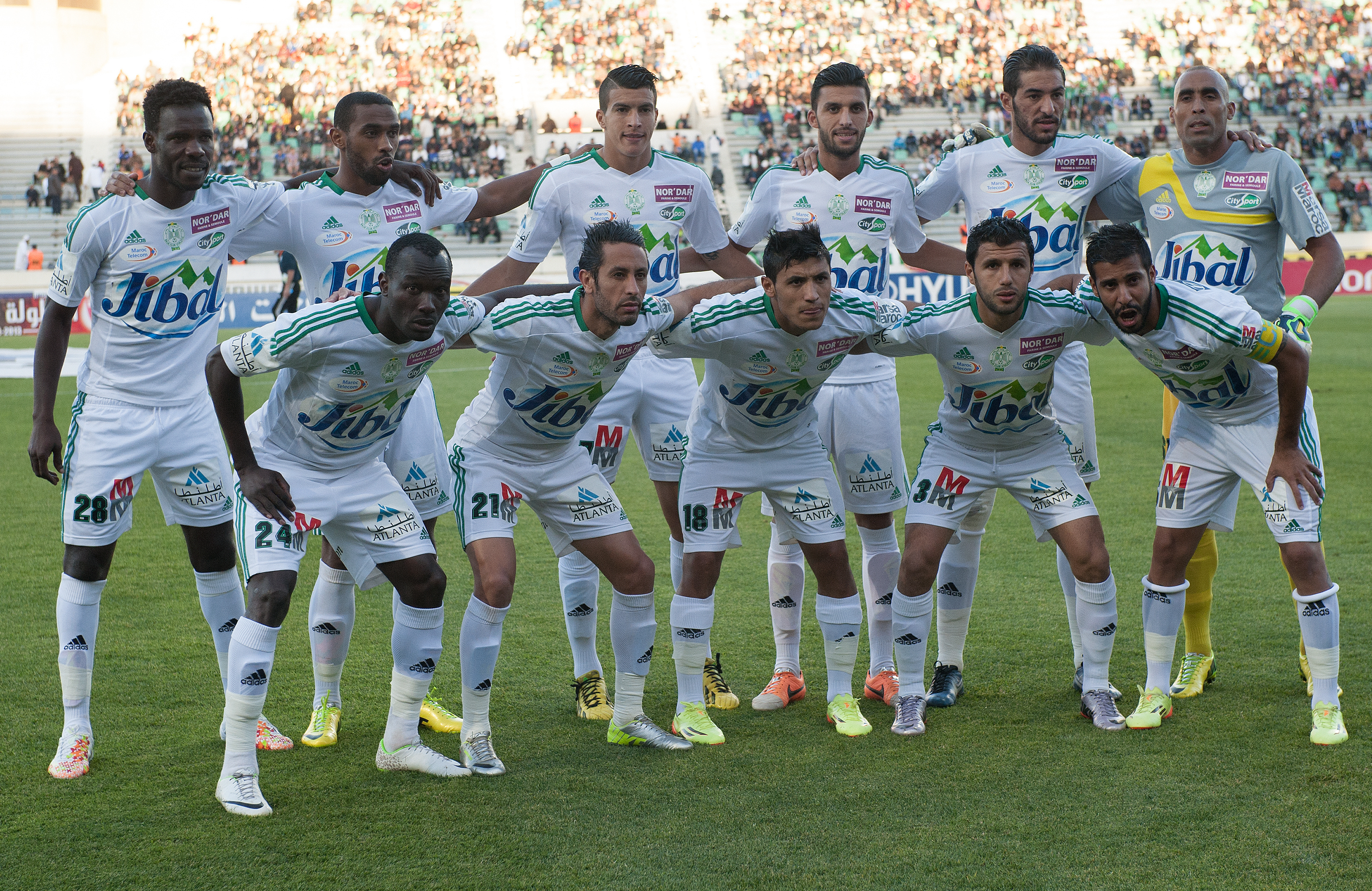
Raja's team that reached the 2013 World Cup final

The history of Raja Club Athletic from 1990 to the present day covers the club's national and African hegemony in the 1990s and 2000s, through the 2013 Club World Cup final, the financial crisis to going undefeated to win their third domestic double in 2024.

In the 1990s, Raja Imposed their dominance on national football, winning a record six consecutive league titles, and in Africa by claiming many titles in Champions League, African Super Cup and Afro-Asian Cup. In 2000, Raja became the first African team to qualify for the Club World Cup. This successful period is closely associated with players like Mustapha Moustawdae, Abdellatif Jrindou, Mustapha Khalif or Mustapha Chadli and managers like Vahid Halilhodžić and Oscar Fulloné. The 2000s were marked by sporting instability mainly caused by the sale of key players and the frequent managerial changes. Nevertheless, in addition to domestic trophies, the club won several international titles: 2003 CAF Cup, 2006 Arab Champions League and lost the 2002 Champions League final.

Under Mohamed Boudrika's presidency, the team was rebuilt and went on to secure its second domestic double in 2012. After the 2013 Club World Cup final, heavy spending and poor results eventually plunged the club into a financial crisis. Jawad Ziyat got the ball rolling financially and Raja managed to win their first African title in fifteen years, their second CAF Super Cup and their first Botola in seven years. They continued their international success, winning the CAF Confederation Cup and the Arab Club Champions Cup in 2021. However, the following seasons were very instable. The return of Boudrika in 2023 and the appointment of Josef Zinnbauer marked a turning point, as Raja enjoyed a historic 2023–24 season, going undefeated for the first time in Botola's history and completing its third domestic double.

== Ups and downs (1990–95) ==
=== Misfortune ===
In June 1990, Abdelmajid Dolmy returned to the club for a final season, much to the delight of supporters who welcomed back one of their greatest players. To prepare for the new season, Raja hosted Girondins de Bordeaux in a friendly, winning 2–1 thanks to a brace of Mustapha Bark. Raja finished ninth and was eliminated from the Cup's quarter-finals by Kenitra AC. In June 1991, two club legends retired; Dolmy and Said Seddiki, who played respectively 18 and 12 years with the first team.

The following season, Raja finished runners-up and reached the Throne Cup final to face Olympique de Casablanca again. The Eagles lost the final on 11 January 1993 at the Stade El Harti (1–0). On 15 October 1992, before playing Fath US (1–0 win, goal of Mohamed Oustad), UNESCO awarded Dolmy with the Fair-play prize, to reward a “player whose exemplary morality and courtesy make him unanimously considered by his partners and opponents as a football ambassador”. He has played more than 750 matches without getting a red card.

They ended as runners-up once again in 1992–93, behind Wydad. In the Throne Cup, they took their revenge against Olympique de Casablanca in the quarter-finals, before exiting the competition against Kawkab Marrakech.

=== Renewal ===
In the summer of 1993, Raja undertook a major squad overhaul under new Algerian coach Meziane Ighil, aiming to rejuvenate an aging squad. Some key players left, such as Abderrahim Hamraoui, Tijani El-Mâataoui, and Khalid Moussalek, and others stayed, such as Salaheddine Bassir, Mustapha Moustawdae, and Abdeslam Laghrissi. Players like Omar Nejjary, Abderezzak Zerraf, Aziz Mountari, Nabil Okba, and Abdellah Moussadek, made it to the first team. Raja then faced the local Algerian national team at Stade du 5 Juillet as a celebration of Algerian players Abdelkader Fréha and Hacène Lalmas. Raja won 1–0, courtesy of a goal of Soumaila Traoré. The preseason preparations continued on 30 August with a match against Botafogo, which they defeated 1–0 thanks to Fakhreddine Miri's goal. Raja's inexperienced squad placed fourth before being eliminated by Maghreb de Fès in the round of 32 of the Throne Cup. In the following season, the team finished eighth and suffered the heaviest defeat in its cup history, losing 5–1 to Fath US.

== National and African hegemony (1995–06) ==
=== Supremacy ===
In 1995, ONA Group announced the dissolution of Olympique de Casablanca due to financial difficulties. Its players became free agents, allowing several of them, including Abdellatif Jrindou and Jamal Sellami, to join Raja. Between 1995 and 2002, Raja became the team to beat, winning six straight Botola titles, an all-time record. This prosperous period peaked in 1999, when Raja established itself as the best African team with victories in the Champions League, the African Super Cup and the Afro-Asian Cup.

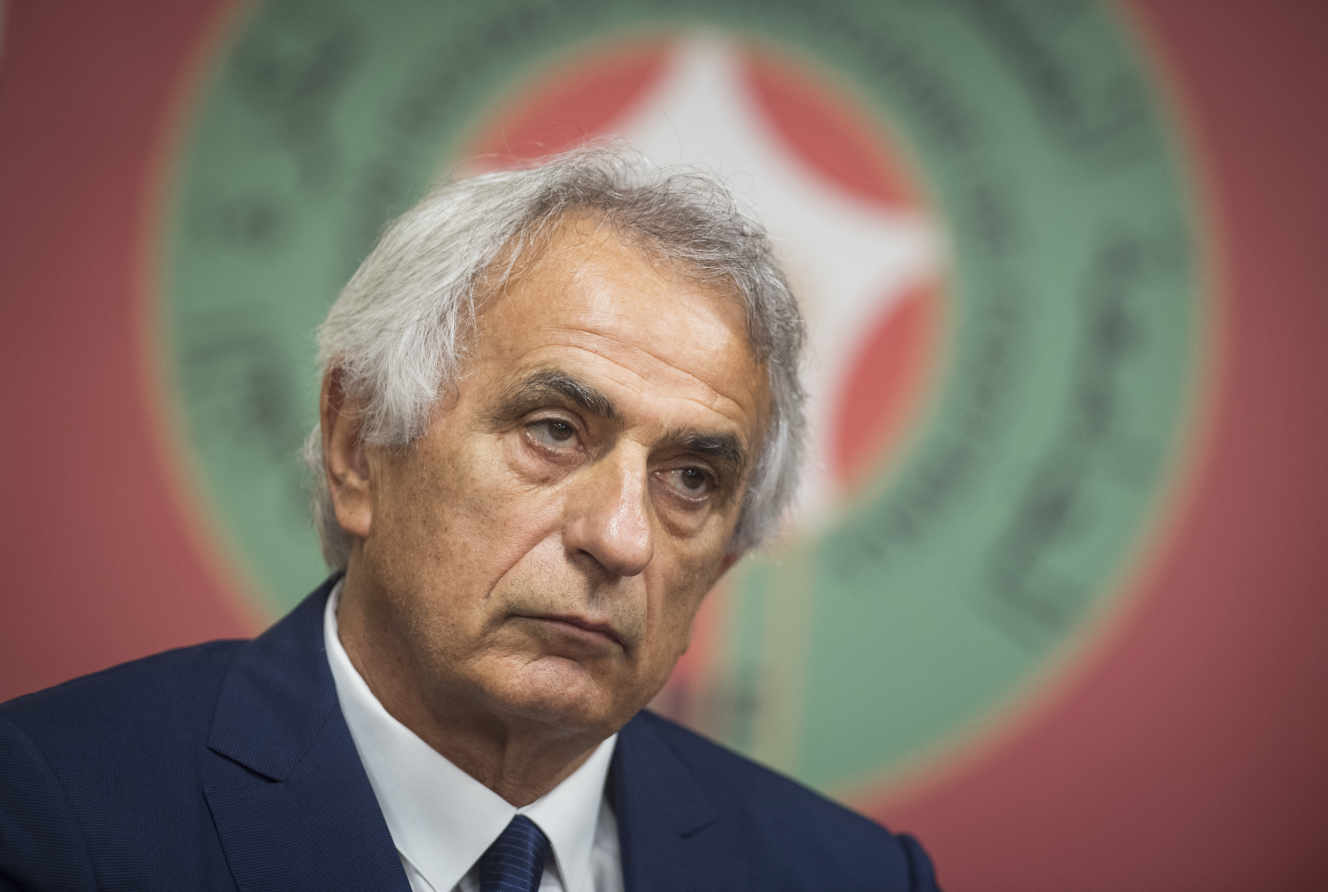
Vahid Halilhodžić won the Champions League a month after his arrival

In June 1995, Raja appointed Russian coach Evgeni Rogov. Diagnosed with terminal cancer, he took a sick leave in February, with his assistant Mohamed Fakhir taking over as caretaker manager. On 18 February 1996, in the quarter-finals of the Throne Cup, Raja recorded the biggest score in the history of the Derby, winning 5–1 (a goal from Sellami and two braces from Nazir and Khalif). They eliminated Rachad Bernoussi (3–0) before beating AS FAR in the final thanks to Abdellatif Jrindou's last-minute goal. In April, Rogov resumed his duties despite his condition and secured the league title on 2 June after a win over Ittihad Tanger. Raja thus won the first league and cup double in its history. Rogov died on 6 July 1996 in Moscow. On 16 September 1996, at the Cairo International Stadium, Raja lost the final of the Arab Club Champions Cup held in Egypt to Al Ahly (3–1).

The 1996 transfer window was marked by the departure of Salaheddine Bassir to Al Hilal, and the arrivals of Abdelkrim Jinani and Jonas Ogandaga and the return from loan of Mustapha Chadli. To build on his achievements, Rogov was succeeded by his compatriot Viktor Razumovskiy, but was quickly replaced in September by Rabah Saâdane. The latter was himself replaced by Alexandru Moldovan a month later. At the end of February 1997, Raja competed in the 1997 Arab Super Cup with a revamped squad to test the new recruits. A draw against OC Khouribga (0–0) and two defeats against Al Faisaly (2–1) and Al Ahly (2–0) closed the competition for them. On 15 June 1997, and after a tough title race with Wydad, Raja defeated Hassania Agadir (4–1) and won their second consecutive league title.

To further strengthen the squad for the new season, Raja finalized several signings during the summer: Youssef Safri and Mohamed Khoubache from Rachad Bernoussi, Noureddine Ziyati from Chabab Mohammédia, Hicham Belmamoune and Zouheir Jbilou from US Sidi Kacem, Dieudonné Londo from 105 Libreville, Réda Ryahi from Difaâ d'El Jadida, and the return on loan of Talal El Karkouri and Hafid Abdessadek. In November, Bosnian manager Vahid Halilhodžić was hired. On 14 December, and after losing the first leg to Goldfields SC (1–0), the Eagles won their second Champions League, the first edition under this new format, on penalties after winning 1–0 thanks to Nazir's goal. On 15 March 1998, Raja lost the African Super Cup to Étoile du Sahel on penalties after regulation time ended 2–2, despite a last-gasp comeback from 2–0. On 3 May, Raja defeated Hassania Agadir away 1–0 and won Botola with a record 67 points and only one defeat, also a record at the time.

In July, Raja completed the most expensive transfer in Moroccan football at the time, selling Jamal Sellami to Beşiktaş JK for €1.8 million. Following the departure of Halilhodžić, Slavoljub Muslin was hired. He made minor squad changes with the arrivals of Hassan Ouchrif, Bouchaib El Moubarki and Mohamed Bouabdellaoui, and the departure of Abdelkarim Nazir to Kuwait SC. On 18 August, the team prepared for the new season by facing Juventus, then Italian champions with Marcello Lippi, during the San Marino Tournament at the Stadio Dino Manuzzi (2–0 defeat).

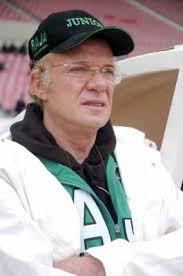
Oscar Fulloné

On 8 November, despite beating Manning Rangers (2–1), the Greens exited the Champions League semi-finals, finishing third of their group. Coupled with a poor start in the league, this elimination resulted in Muslin's sacking and the appointment of Oscar Fulloné. On 25 April 1999, they won the Afro-Asian Cup against Pohang Steelers, courtesy of a goal of Zakaria Aboub (1–0), after a 2–2 draw in Pohang (goals from Moustawdae and Khalif). On 29 June 1999, Raja defeated JS Massira 2–1 and secured their fourth consecutive Botola title.

On 12 December, during the second leg of the 1999 Champions League final, and after a 0–0 draw at the Père Jégo Stadium, Raja faced Espérance de Tunis at El Menzah Stadium. From the get go, the referee whistled a very controversial penalty and sent off captain Jrindou, who handed his armband to Moustawdae. The match ended goalless. After the penalty shootout, Chadli saved Chokri El Ouaer's penalty, giving his team the title and, at the same time, their ticket to the Club World Cup in Brazil, being the first Arab and African team to do so. Raja was eliminated after three defeats against Corinthians (0–2), Al Nasr (3–4, goals from Nejjary, El Moubarki, and El Karkouri), and Real Madrid (2–3, goals from Achami and Moustawdae), a match in which Raja put in a memorable performance against the Merengues, only losing to a late goal from Geremi. Their display earned them widespread praise from the sports press and a standing ovation at the Estádio do Morumbi.

On 5 March 2000, Raja beat Africa Sports thanks to goals from El Moubarki and Armoumen (2–0). On 28 May, despite winning 2–1 in the first leg, Raja exited the Champions League quarter-finals after a 1–0 defeat against ASC Jeanne d'Arc in Dakar. On 21 June, after their 4–1 victory over JS Massira, the Eagles set a new record and secured their fifth consecutive Botola title.

On 12 July, to prepare for the new season, Raja hosted Paris Saint-Germain in a friendly. Despite Paris opening the scoring, Raja won thanks to a Bouchaib El Moubarki's hat-trick (3–2). On 20 May 2001, despite a season marked by the passages of Fathi Jamal, Valdeir Vieira, Alexandru Moldovan and Silvester Takač in the bench, they secured their sixth straight Botola title after a 1–0 win over Kawkab Marrakech, improving their own record. On 27 May, Raja exited the quarter-finals of the Champions League for the second time in a row, despite a home win against TP Mazembe (2–1), after losing in Lubumbashi (2–0). Takač was also dismissed and the interim was entrusted to Mohamed Nejmi.

=== Slight decline ===
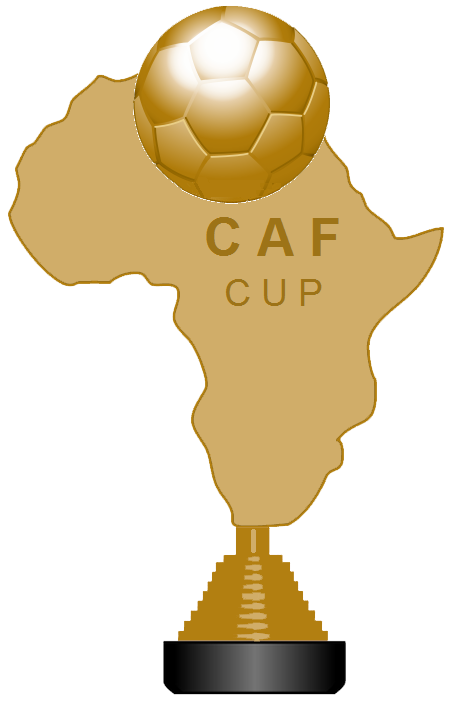
CAF Cup trophy retained by Raja

Fathi Jamal started the 2001–02 season as interim manager. On 16 September, Yuriy Sevastyanenko was appointed, but was dismissed after three weeks, following a defeat to Wydad in the Throne Cup semi-final. Jamal took over for a second time but resigned. Mohamed Nejmi replaced him during a month before the arrival of Walter Meews in January 2002. Under new management, the team regained its form after the signing of François Endene and the resurgence of its two top scorers, Ali Diallo and Hicham Aboucherouane. They went on to lead the Botola standings and qualify for the Champions League's group stage. But they fell short at the end of the season, failing to retain the league title for the first time in seven years.

On 17 November 2002, Raja qualified for the Champions League final after overcoming a 2–0 defeat by beating ASEC Abidjan 4–0 in the second leg at the Stade Mohammed V. After a goalless first leg against a defensively hunkered down Zamalek, Raja lost in Cairo (1–0), thus losing a Champions League final for the first time. They also finished runners-up of the 2002–03 Botola. Mustapha Bidoudane was crowned top scorer with 14 goals; the last Rajaoui to earn this trophy was Houmane Jarir back in 1967.

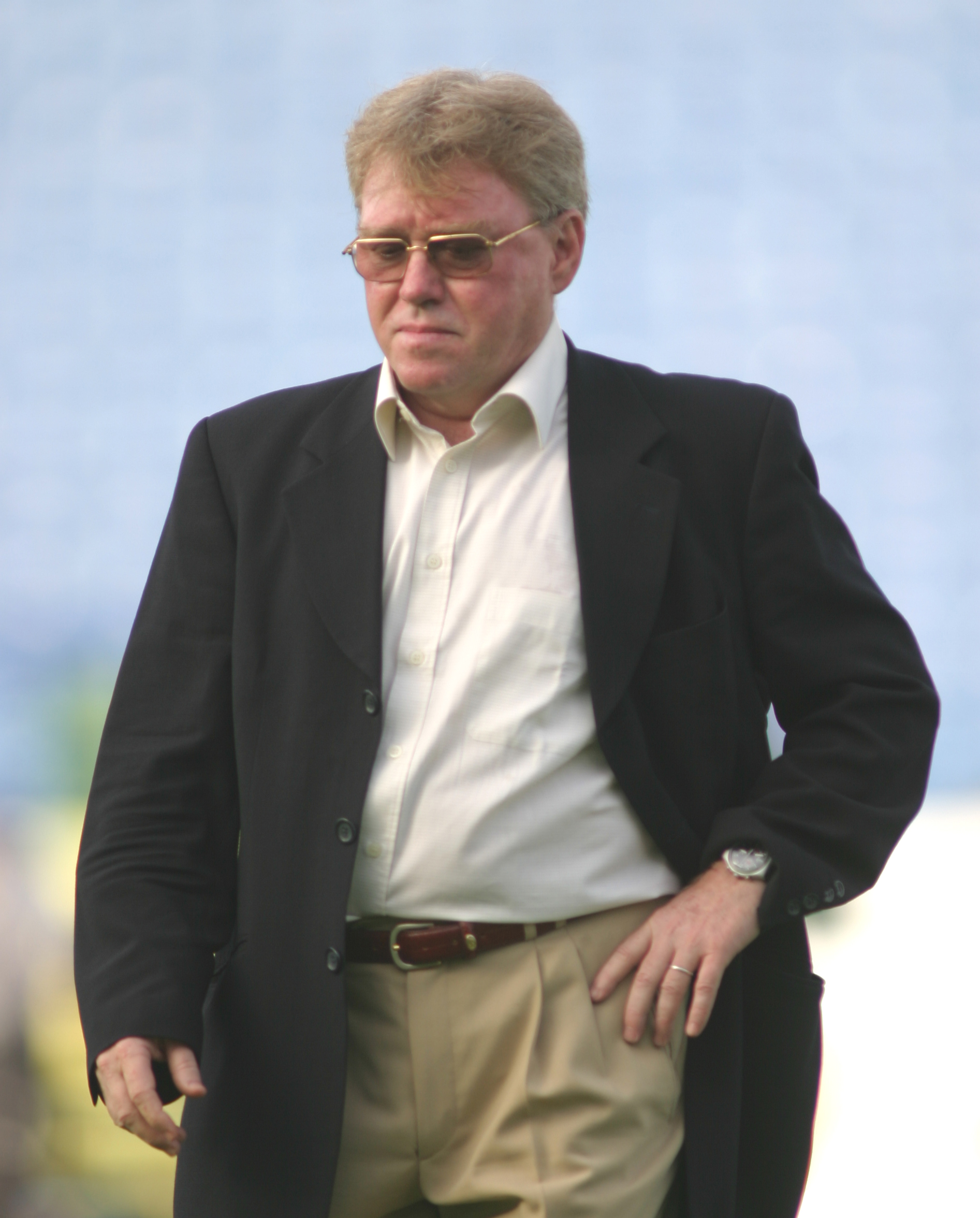
Alexandru Moldovan during the 2005 Throne Cup final, won on penalties.

On 23 November 2003 at Roumdé Adjia Stadium, Henri Michel's team won the CAF Cup against Cotonsport (0–0), after their 2–0 victory in the first leg thanks to goals from Bidoudane and Diallo. This was the last edition of this competition before it was merged with the African Cup Winners' Cup to create the Confederation Cup, allowing Raja to retain the trophy permanently.. On 11 January 2004, Raja won the Throne Cup after beating Maghreb AS 2–0, goals of Moussa Souleiman and Bidoudane. On 25 April, the Eagles were eliminated from the second round of the Champions League. At the Moulay Abdellah Stadium, Raja defeated ASC Jeanne d'Arc 2–0 (Misbah and Bidoudane), but the Senegalese side matched the score in Dakar and won the penalty shootout. On 20 June, after a fierce title race, the final matchday pitted Raja against Kénitra AC, and AS FAR against Kawkab Marrakech. After an hour of play, Raja were already leading 4–1, while AS FAR held a 1–0 advantage. Youssef Kaddioui then added a second goal, seemingly putting the title beyond doubt. However, the Kawkabis fought back and equalized in the final minute, handing the title to Raja, exactly one year after they had denied them the same trophy by holding them to a 2–2 draw in Casablanca.

On 16 July 2005, at the Moulay Abdallah Stadium, Alexandru Moldovan's team won their sixth Throne Cup, defeating Olympique Khouribga on penalties. On 15 October, Etoile du Sahel eliminated Raja from the Champions League semi-finals with a 2–0 aggregate score. A few days later, Moldovan was discharged, and his assistant Jamal Sellami succeeded him as an interim. His first assignment seemed daunting, with Raja needing to overturn a 2–0 deficit against Zamalek SC in the 2005–06 Arab Champions League. Despite the setback in Rabat, the Greens produced a stunning 3–0 comeback in Cairo, thanks to goals from Maïga, Alloudi and Iajour. After Oscar Fulloné took charge in December, Raja secured the title on 6 May 2006 against ENPPI SC, winning the final 3–1 on aggregate. In the Botola, they recorded their worst finish since 1995, ending in fourth place.

== Between domestic success and continental setbacks (2006–12) ==
=== End of an era ===
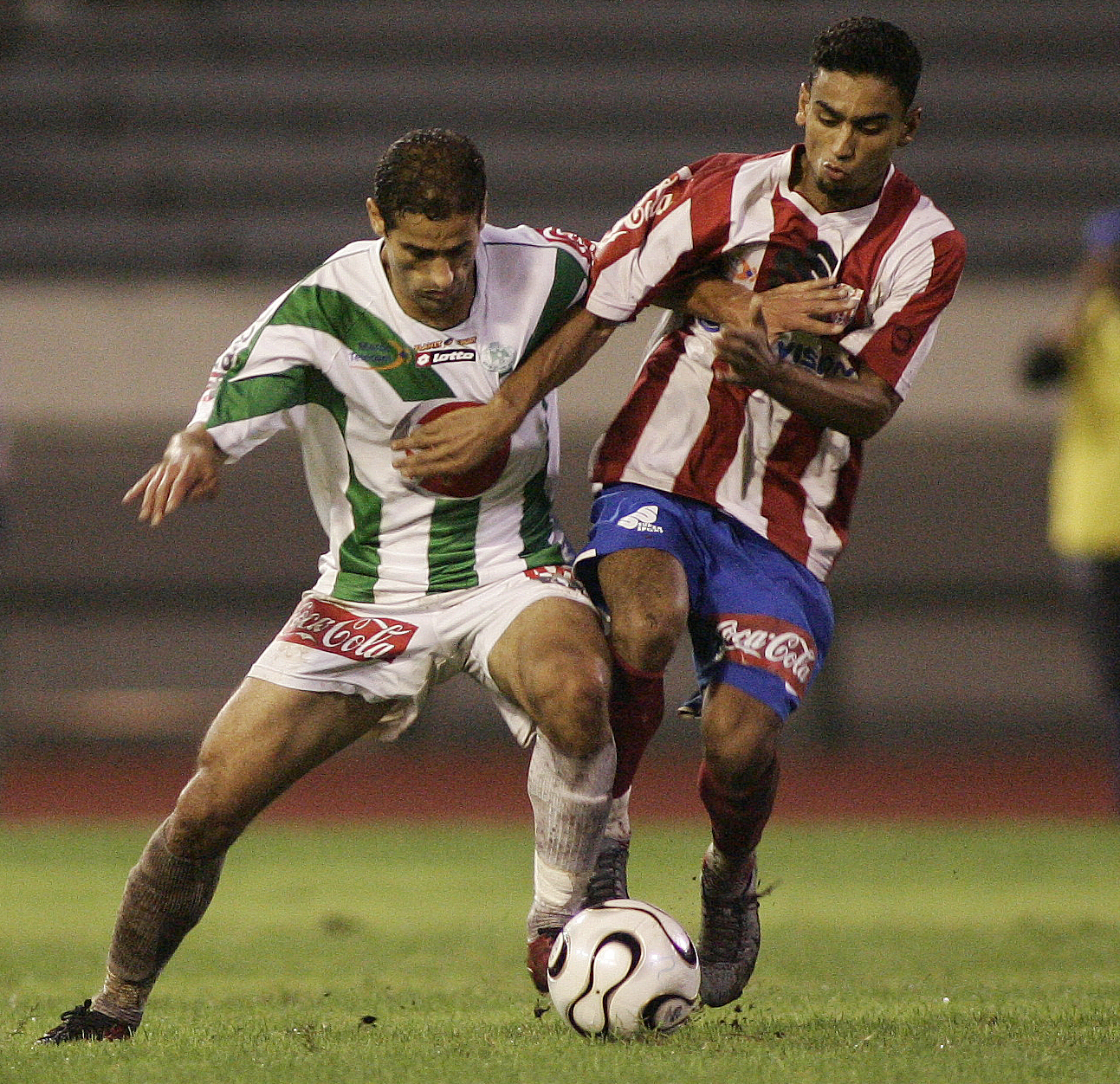
Zakaria Zerouali in 2007

Ahead of the 2006–07 season, Raja lost many key players, including Marouane Zemmama, Modibo Maïga, Abdelouahed Abdessamad, Adil Bekkari, Noureddine Harouach and Mustapha Bidoudane (some of them left in the winter). On November 26, after beating Markaz Tulkarem 14–0 on aggregate, the Eagles faced Al Ahly Jeddah in the Arab Champions League. After a 1–1 draw in Jeddah, they were eliminated after a 3–3 draw at the Moulay Abdellah Stadium.

On December 7, Paco Fortes replaced Oscar Fulloné after a poor start in the league, earning just ten points in his opening ten matches. The Spaniard was also dismissed before the end of the season and Mohamed Nejmi was appointed interim manager. Amid a period of transition, the team struggled throughout the season, ultimately finishing eleventh and exiting the Throne Cup from the quarterfinals.

On 12 June 2007, new coach Jean-Yves Chay implemented a complete overhaul of the squad. The departures of Ismail Kouha, Abdessamad Chahiri, Hamid Nater, Jesús Gómez, Jonathan Laurens, Soufiane Alloudi, Mouhcine Iajour, Ousman Jallow and Modibo Maïga were offset by the arrivals of Amine El Bourkadi, Hicham El Amrani, Mourad Ainy, Abdellah Jlaidi, Omar Nejjary, Ciré Dia, André Senghor, Abdelali Essamlali, Redouane Baqlal and Tahar Doghmi. Promising academy players such as Mohamed Oulhaj, Ismail Benlamaalem, Mohsine Moutouali and Abdessamad Ouhaki joined the first team. On 17 August, Raja won the Arab Summer Cup, a friendly tournament organized by the ART in Switzerland including Al-Hilal FC, Al Ain Club and Kuwait SC. Despite a five-match winless start, the team regained its form. This young squad even claimed two wins in the Derby and finished third in the standings In the Cup, they lost to Moghreb Tetouan in the quarterfinals. In the Arab Champions League, Raja dominated the early rounds before being finishing third in their group behind ES Sétif and Al-Faisaly. On 26 May 2008, the club announced the transfer of Elamin Erbate to Olympique de Marseille for €1 million.

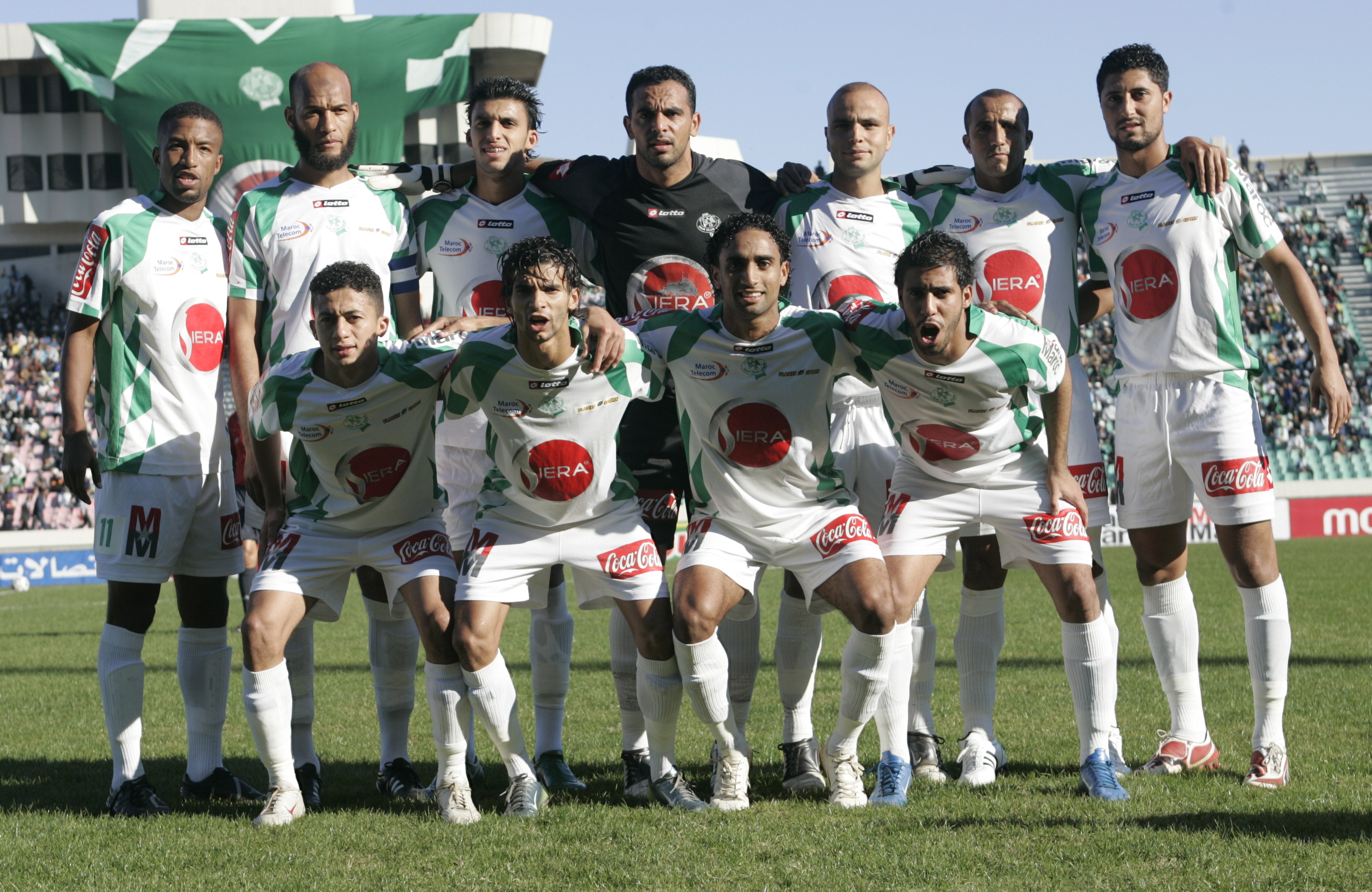
2008–09 Botola champions

=== National domination and African failure ===
In May 2008, the new manager José Romão stated in a press conference that he was aiming for the double. Raja recruited Samir Zekroumi, Nabil Mesloub, Youssef Agnaou, Khalid Hamdaoui, Omar Najdi, and André Senghor on loan. A hesitant start was followed by a 22-match unbeaten run that put them at the top. On 30 May 2009, Raja defeated Chabab Mohammedia 1–0 thanks to a Najdi goal and reclaimed the title after a five-year drought. On June 6, Carlos Mozer replaced Romão, whose contract had expired. The club signed Tarik El Jarmouni, Youness Bellakhdar, Zakaria Aboub, Kouko Guehi, Soufiane Alloudi and Yassine Salhi (returning from his loan at Racing AC). Following a difficult opening to the season, Raja parted ways with the Brazilian coach and brought Romão back. Kouko Guehi and Mamadou Baila were recruited in January. On 15 May 2010, Raja traveled to face AS FAR in the final fixture. Despite leading the standings, they lost 1–0, allowing Wydad to claim the title. After early exits from the Throne Cup, the North African Cup of Champions and the Champions League, Abdellah Rhallam faced mounting criticism and eventually resigned as club president.

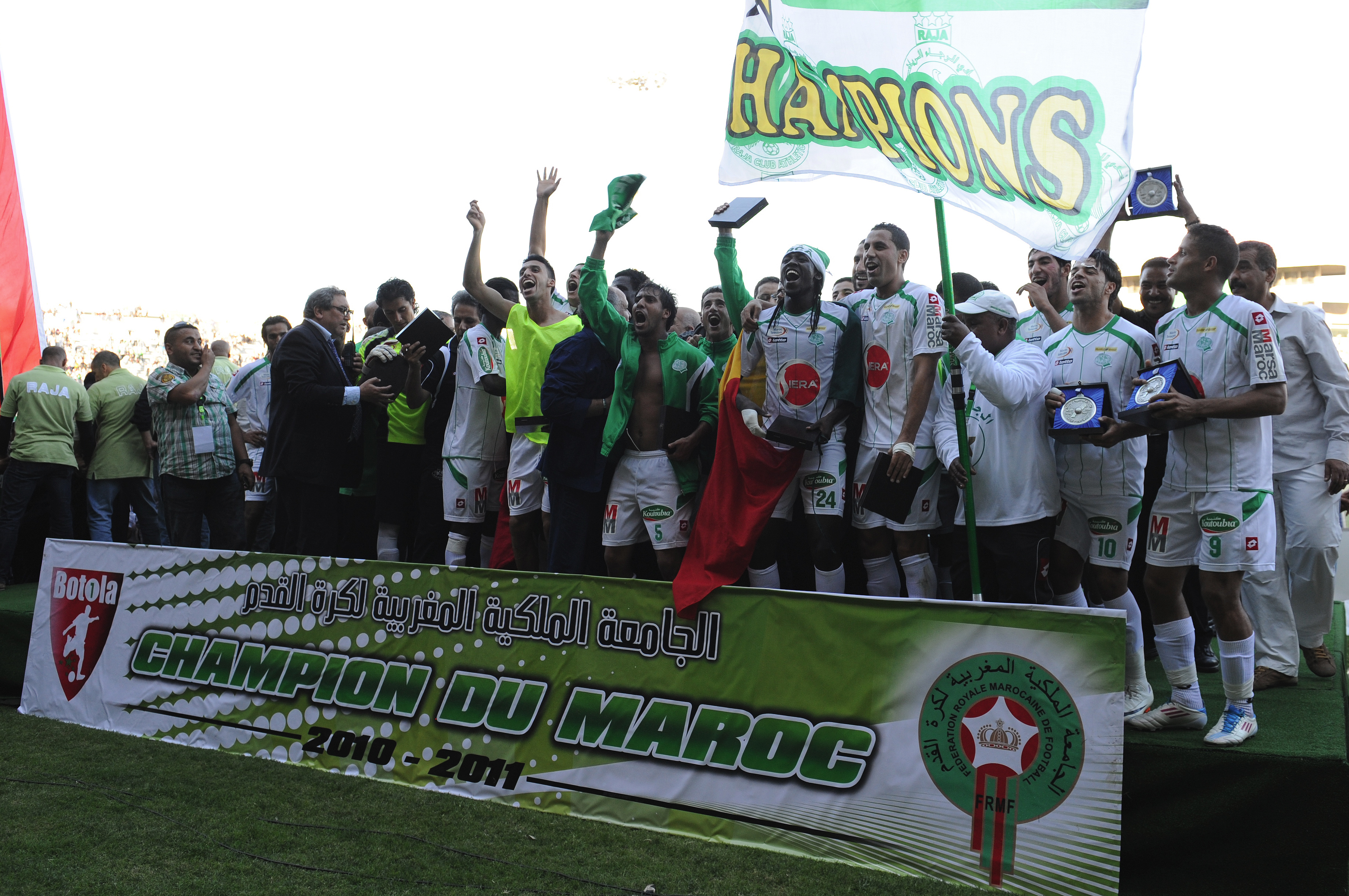
Raja players celebrating the 2010–11 Botola

On June 4, the general assembly elected former president Abdesalam Hanat. On July 1, Henri Michel returned to the club. Under his leadership, the club recruited Hicham Mahdoufi, Lanciné Koné, Abdelmoula Berrabeh, Bouchaib El Moubarki, Elamin Erbate and Hicham Aboucherouane. But the results were not as good as in 2003, and the Frenchman resigned on October 6. Raja turned to club legend M'hamed Fakhir, who became the club's first Moroccan coach in almost 20 years. On 28 January 2011, Raja recorded their biggest ever Champions league win, crushing Tourbillon FC 10–1. They then qualified for the group stage for the first time since 2005 after beating ASEC Mimosas in a single leg in Casablanca due to political instability in Abidjan. On May 21, Raja won their tenth Botola title, defeating Olympique Khouribga 2–1.

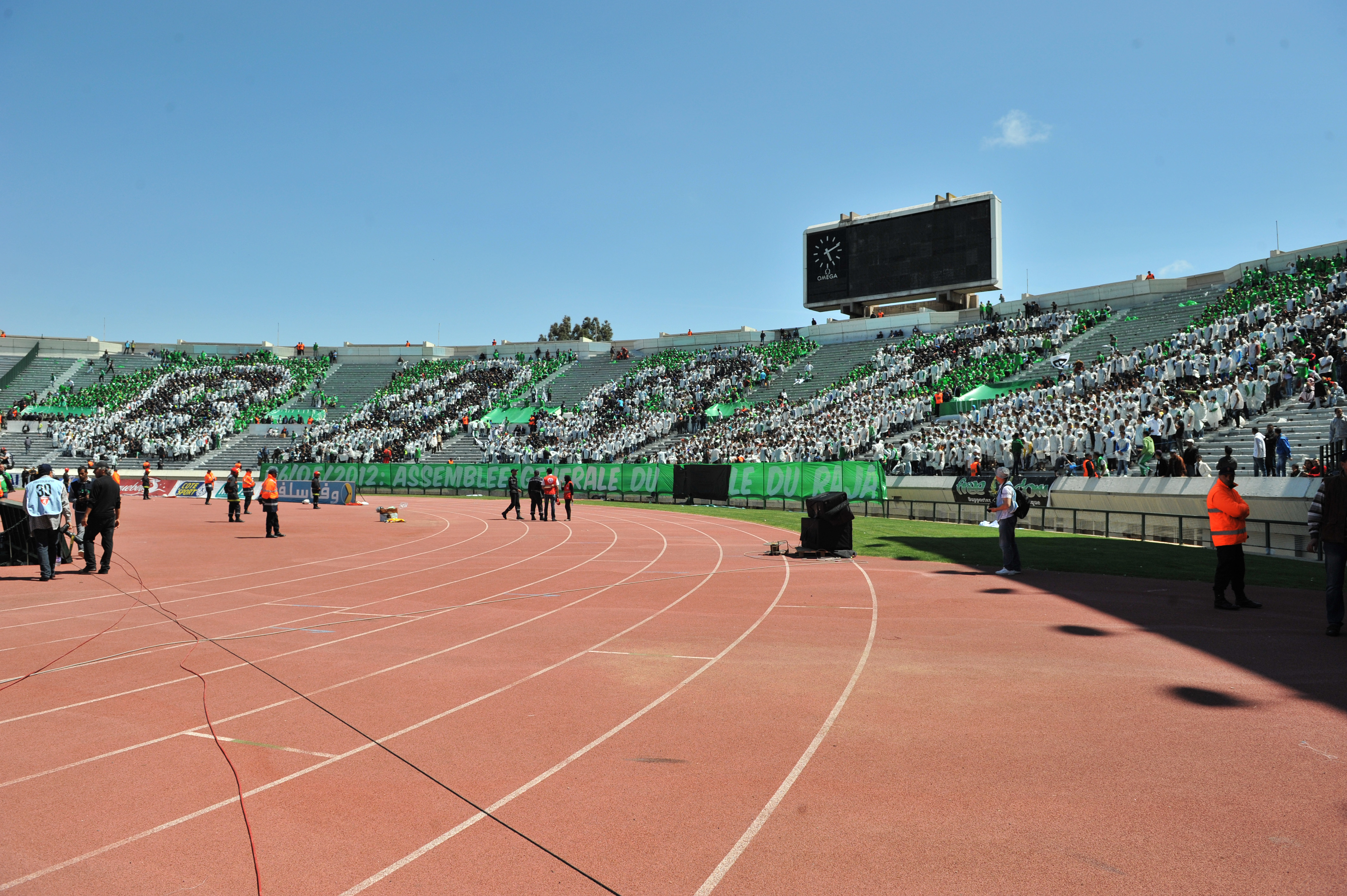
The 'BASTA' tifo, expressing the anger of the supporters, marks the beginning of a new era.

In July, Fakhir stepped down, prompting the departure of many key players. He was succeeded by Bertrand Marchand. In the Champions League, Raja endured its worst-ever group-stage campaign, drawing three and losing three of its six matches, scoring only once. On 3 October 2011, Zakaria Zerouali passed away after a 30-hour hospitalization. The circumstances surrounding his death remained unclear, with several possible explanations reported, including travel to Africa without vaccination, a fever and a possible paracetamol overdose. Fans and players alike expressed widespread support for his family. Raja failed to win any of its first five games but subsequently improved and challenged for the title before fading in the closing stages to finish fourth. Late-season defeats, including one in the Derby, provoked widespread discontent among fans, who called for the president's departure. He resigned days later, prompting the scheduling of a general assembly for 7 June 2012.

== Boudrika era (2012–16) ==
=== Second domestic double ===
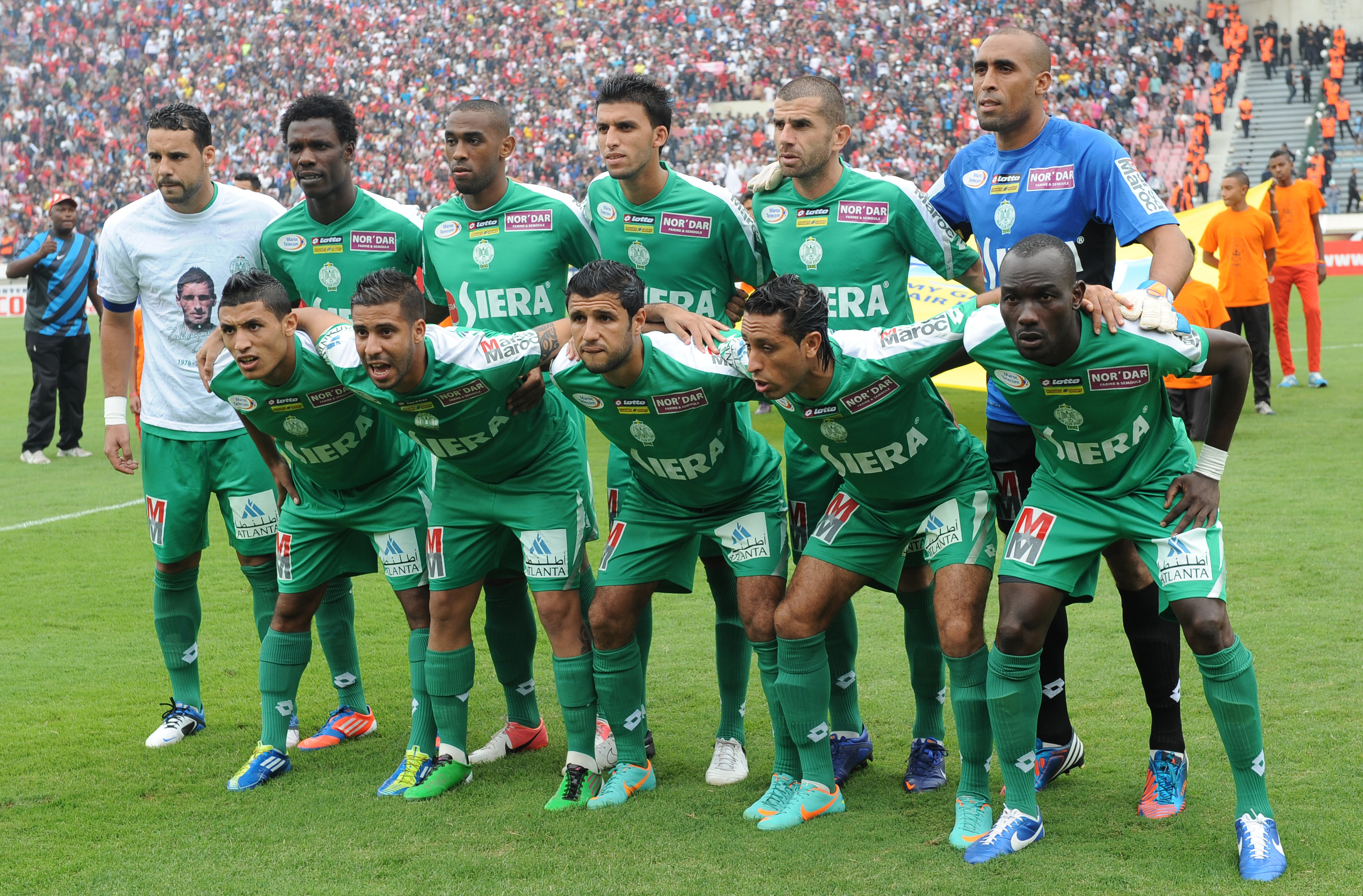
The team that won the domestic double in the 2012–13 season

The assembly elected Mohamed Boudrika who, becomes, at 28, the youngest president in the club's history. With the return of M'hamed Fakhir, Boudrika introduced an ambitious project backed by major financial investment, aiming to revive the club through significant changes and the recruitment of top players. Names like Khalid Askri, Abdelfettah Boukhriss, Zakaria El Hachimi, Adil Karrouchy, Chemseddine Chtibi, Adel Chedli, Vianney Mabidé, Hamza Abourazzouk and Mouhcine Iajour, to name just a few, all arrived at Oasis.

Raja started its preseason in Tunisia before returning to Casablanca for a friendly against Athletic Bilbao, which attracted 60,000 supporters eager to rediscover their team. They defeated the Europa League and Copa del Rey runners-up 3–1. Raja started the season strongly and soon took the lead. On 18 November, they claimed their seventh Throne Cup at the Moulay Abdellah Stadium, defeating AS FAR on penalties (0–0). On 3 April 2013, they exited the Arab Cup semi-finals against Al Arabi SC, drawing 2–2 at the Al Abdi Stadium despite taking the lead thanks to a brace from Moutouali. On May 25, Raja hosted Difaâ El Jadida in the penultimate match. After conceding first, a superb free-kick from Karrouchy brought them level before Moutouali, as in 2011, scored a last-minute penalty that secured them the Botola title after a dominant season. They also qualified for the 2013 FIFA Club World Cup, hosted by Morocco.

=== Runners–ups and World Cup final ===
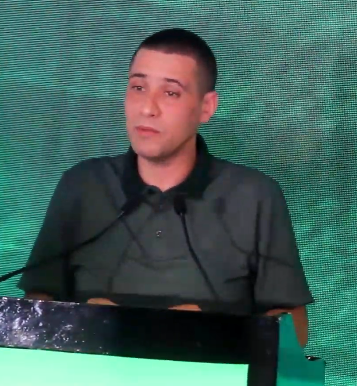
Mohamed Boudrika

Raja's summer transfer window was relatively calm, marked mainly by the departure of Adel Chedli and the arrivals of Issam Erraki, Marouane Zemmama and Idrissa Coulibaly. After Amine Erbate's exit, Fakhir entrusted the captaincy to Moutouali. Despite the presence of more experienced players, he displayed leadership qualities, and the coach wanted him to grow a sense of responsibility that he lacked sometimes. The team struggled to keep its momentum and only earned 16 points out of 30. On November 18, Raja lost the Throne Cup final on penalties to Difaâ El Jadida, despite being the favorite. For the fans, this was the final straw. Just days before the World Cup, Fakhir was replaced by Faouzi Benzarti.

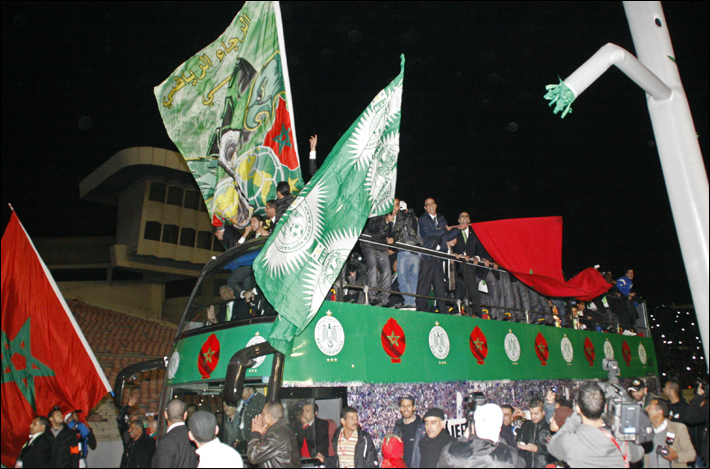
The team celebrated at the Stade Mohammed V after the World Cup

From 11 to 21 December 2013, the Eagles took part in the 2013 Club World Cup. They eliminated Auckland City (2–1), C.F. Monterrey (2–1) and Atlético Mineiro (3–1) to reach the final, a stage never reached by an Arab or a North African team. They lost 2–0 to Bayern Munich but came out proud with the acclamation of the supporters and the international press. They were welcomed by Mohammed VI who pays tribute to them during a ceremony at the Royal palace where he decorated the entire team. In January, Benzarti shortened the squad during the winter, authorizing the departures of Ahmed Rahmani, Redouane Derdouri, Deo Kanda, Chemseddine Chtibi, Abdelmajid Jilani and Badr Kachani. Abdelkabir El Ouadi and Amr Zaki were signed, but the latter left after a month. After a disappointing first half of the season, the team took the league by storm, collecting 35 points out of 45, scoring 30 goals and conceding 6. On the penultimate match, the Greens snatched the first place by crushing the leaders, Moghreb Tétouan, 5–0. Raja traveled to Safi needing a final win to clinch the title. Against all odds, Olympique Safi struck with a shocking goal, shattering Raja's title dreams and handing the trophy to Tétouan.

=== Disappointment ===
On 1 June 2014, Abdelhak Benchikha was appointed new manager. Several players arrived under his leadership, including Ahmed Chagou, Abdeljalil Jbira, Said Fettah, Youssef El Gnaoui, Ali Bemammer, Salaheddine Aqqal, Jawad Issine and Lys Mouithys. However, the exits of key-players like Issam Erraki, Mohsine Moutouali and Mouhcine Iajour were a hard blow to the team.

Despite a good start that gave them the lead, the coach tenure was short, and he was replaced in September by José Romão, following an early elimination against AS FAR. In January 2015, Christian Osaguona arrived from Enugu Rangers and proved valuable to the attack, scoring five goals in the Champions League against Diables Noirs and Kaizer Chiefs. However, Raja lost on penalties to ES Sétif after an epic comeback in Algeria (4–4 aggregate). They were then relegated to the Confederation Cup, where they were knocked out by ES Sahel (2–3 aggregate). Romão was sacked and replaced by Fathi Jamal as an interim. Their season collapsed with just a single victory in their final thirteen matches. Slumping to an 8th-place finish, it went down as one of the worst seasons in the club's history.

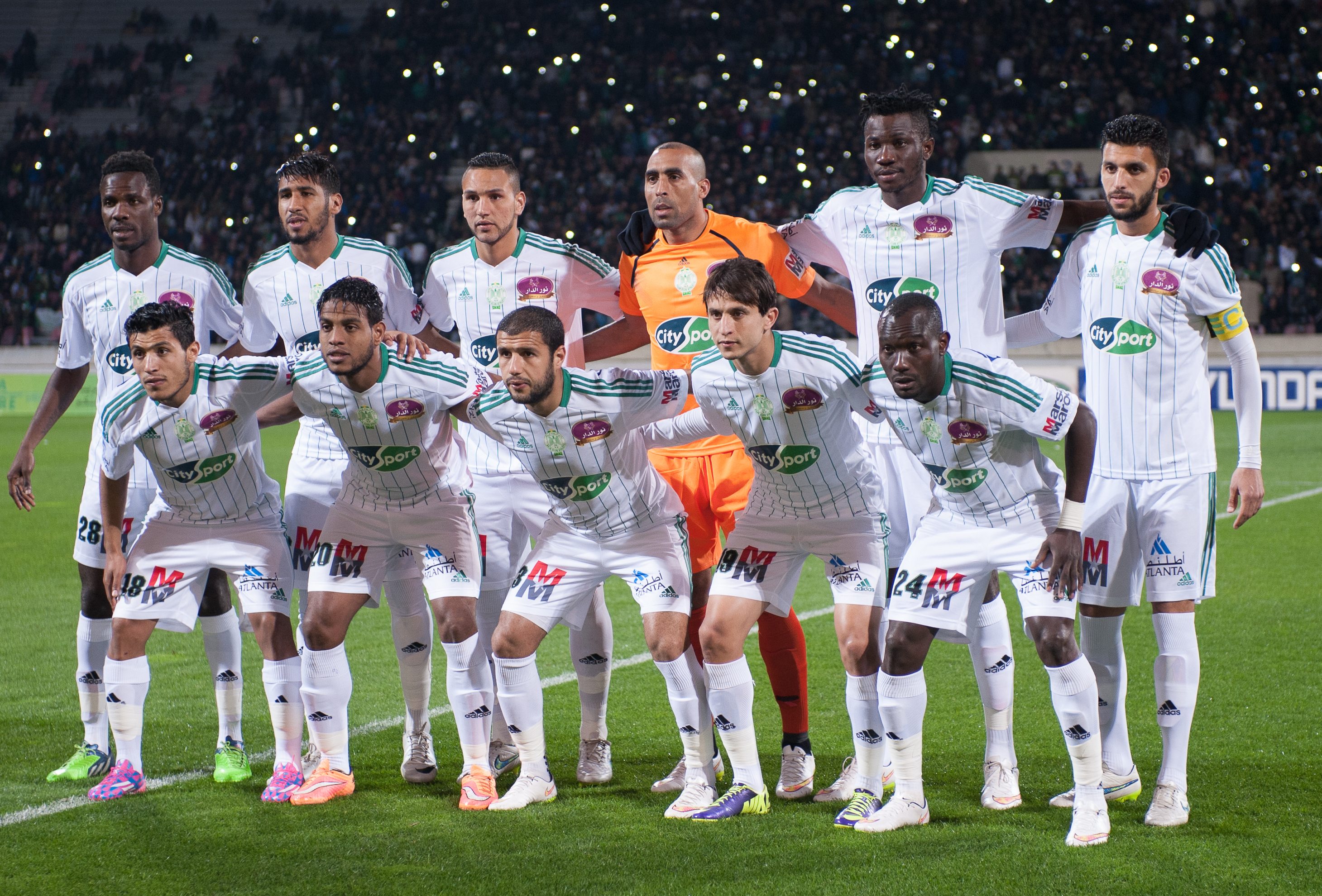
Raja during the 2014–15 season

Despite signing a pre-contract with Raja on 8 May 2015, Faouzi Benzarti changed his mind and decided to remain in Tunisia. The club confirmed they received an apology from him, noting his intention to pay the buyout clause to prevent any legal action. Ruud Krol signed a two-year contract on 12 June 2015. The Dutch coach oversaw a very busy mercato, signing Anas Zniti, Lema Mabidi, Ahmed Jahouh, Youssef Kaddioui, Khaled Korbi and Mohamed Awal, and releasing Kouko Guehi, Khalid Askri, Youssef El Gnaoui, Salaheddine Aqqal, Ahmed Chagou and Jawad Issine.

During this critical period, Raja managed to win the UNAF Club Cup after beating Club Africain (2–0) and Ismaily SC (1–0). They also drew against Al Hilal Benghazi. Following his disappointing results, Krol was replaced by Rachid Taoussi on November 5. Despite a tricky start, the team began to click into gear and managed a six-match winning streak between February and April. On 8 May 2016, at the Ibn-Batouta Stadium, the first-ever Derby behind closed doors took place. Osaguona opened the scoring, Hafidi doubled the lead before Erraki sealed the victory with a superb free kick (3–0). This was the Derby's biggest score since Raja's 3–0 win in 2003. The match was even more memorable as it coincided with their rival's anniversary. However, the team lost momentum towards the end of the season and finished fifth. In the Throne Cup, Raja refused to continue their match against Difaâ El Jadida in protest against the referee. FRMF accused Taoussi of instigating the incident and banned him for six months.

== Crisis (2016–18) ==
On 16 June 2016, after the end Boudrika's four-year term, Said Hasbane was elected. He stated that the club is in a financial crisis and therefore needed to find solutions by bringing in new sponsors. On August 10, Raja thanked Taoussi and hired M'hamed Fakhir, marking his third stint at the club after 2010 and 2012. Several players were recruited, including Jawad El Yamiq, Saad Lamti, and Samson Mbingui, while Michel Babatunde and Christian Osaguona left. On 27 March 2017, Issam Erraki won the Best Footballer award at the Mars d'Or ceremony. After a complicated season, they finished third. The financial problems worsened and supporters demanded the president's resignation who refused to communicate with the press. Fakhir resigned, fed up with the bad management the club had been experiencing during all of the season. On 20 June, following the resignation of Abdelhak Benchikha for personal reasons just days after his appointment, Juan Carlos Garrido was appointed as head coach. Despite the situation, the Greens managed to secure their eighth Throne Cup against Difaâ El Jadida after a penalty shootout, after 120 minutes of play (1–1). Raja, with 14 titles, is the most decorated Moroccan club of the 21st century, ahead of AS FAR with 8 titles. On 4 February 2018, El Yamiq joined Genoa CFC, who paid his €850,000 release clause. On April 6, after a long standoff with club members, Hasbane resigned. Former president Mohamed Aouzal is tasked with forming a provisional committee to run the club until the end of the season.

The winners of the 2018 Confederation Cup, Raja's first continental title in 15 years

== Renewed ambitions (2018–2023) ==
=== Back on top ===
On 13 September 2018, Jawad Ziyat was elected. The new president promised to continue the work of the interim committee to save the club from its financial crisis. In December 2018, Raja won the 2018 CAF Confederation Cup against AS Vita Club, winning the first leg 3–0 at home and losing 3–1 in Kinshasa, thus securing its second title in the competition. This also ended a 15-year period without a continental title. On December 16, after a match against Cercle Mbéri (5–0), the Stade Mohammed V is closed for renovation. Raja is forced to play its domestic matches at Père Jégo Stadium and its African matches at Moulay-Abdallah Stadium. On 28 January, two days after their 2–0 defeat to ES Sahel in the Arab Club Champions Cup quarterfinals, Garrido was sacked and his assistant Youssef Safri was named as interim coach. He won his only match in El Jadida, thanks to a hat-trick from Mouhcine Iajour (2–4). On January 30, Patrice Carteron was appointed. He stated, "It is an immense honor to join such an iconic club, with the best fans in Africa and one of the best in the world".

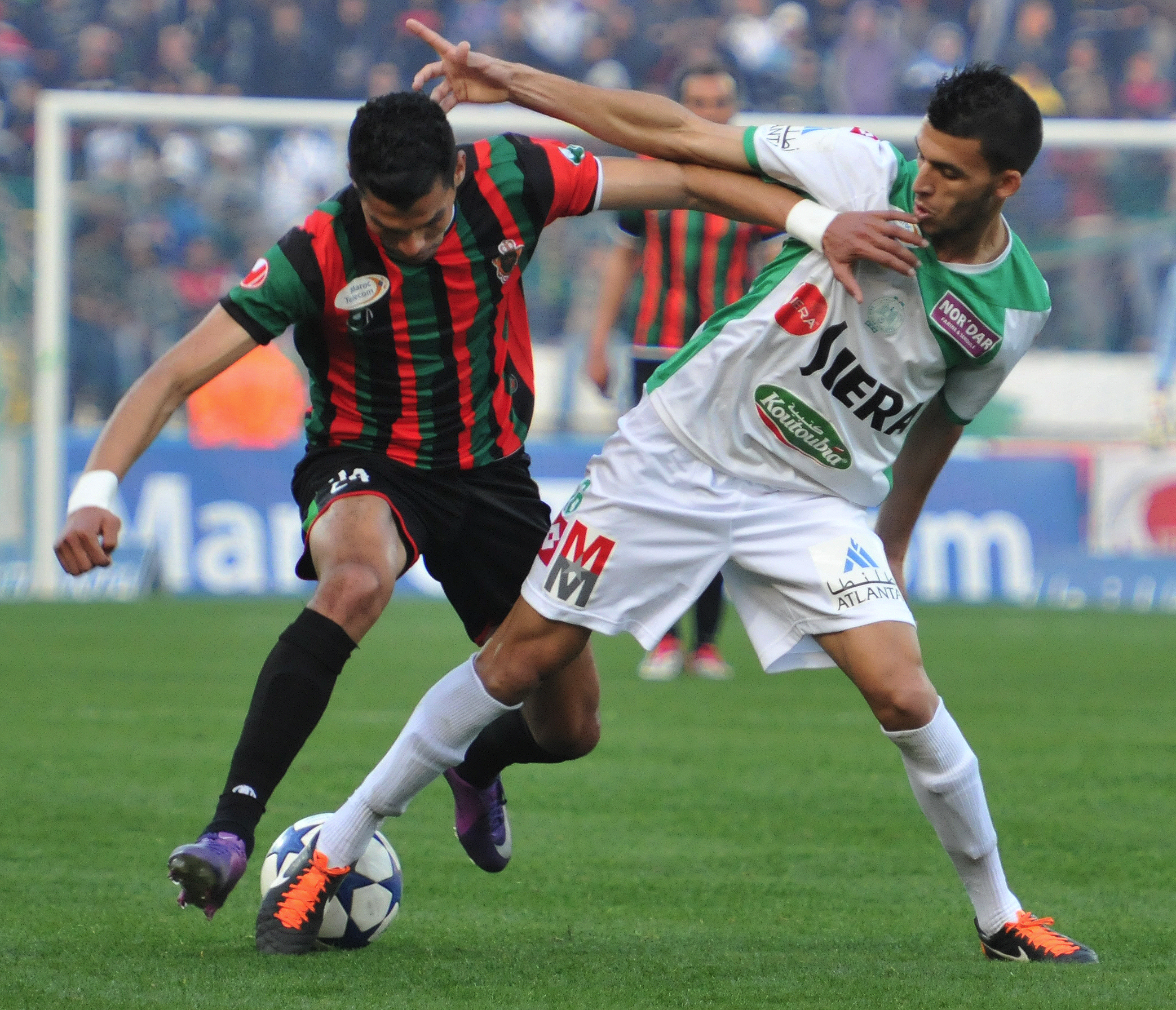
Mohamed Oulhaj left the club after 12 years of loyal service

On 29 March, Raja won their second CAF Super Cup against ES Tunis at the Jassim bin Hamad Stadium (2–1). On May 8, Carteron's contract is extended until 2020. On 11 May, following a 2–1 win against MC Oujda, Raja became the first Moroccan team to reach 100 goals in a single season. After beating Difaâ El Jadida (2–0), the Greens finished runners-up after playing 61 matches this season, a Moroccan record. Iajour was crowned the league's top scorer with 19 goals.

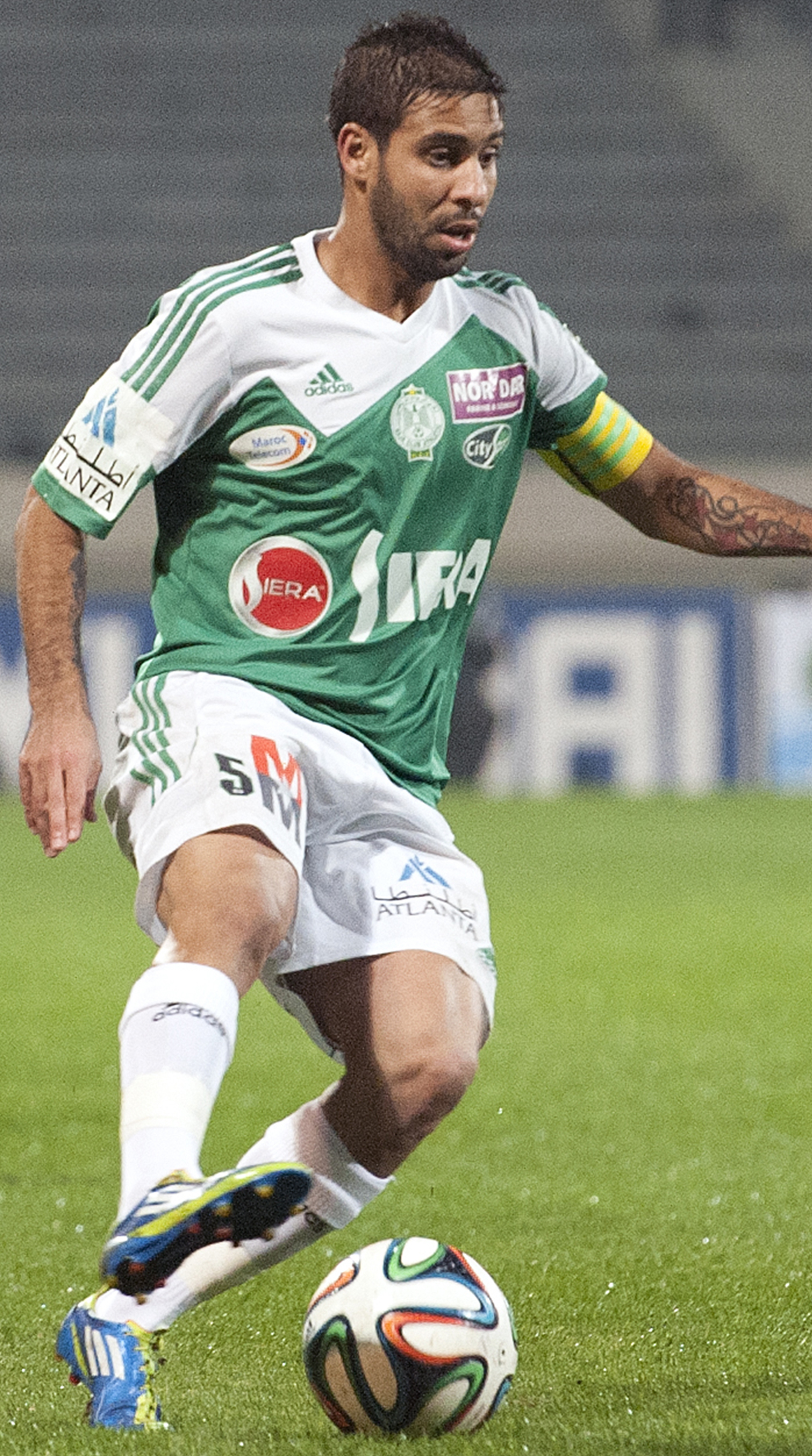
Mohsine Moutouali, who played for the club from 2006 to 2014, made his return in 2019.

On 12 May 2019, Raja announced the return of Mohsine Moutouali for next season. Salif Coulibaly, Fabrice Ngoma, Omar Arjoune, Ben Malango, and Hamid Ahaddad were also signed. On June 12, assistant coach Youssef Safri resigned. Talal El Karkouri and Hicham Aboucharouane succeeded him. After twenty years at the club, Mohamed Oulhaj bid farewell in a friendly match against Real Betis. Zakaria Hadraf, Lema Mabidi, Ibrahima Niasse, and Mouhcine Iajour also left. They played their first match on 10 August 2019 against Brikama United for the Champions League's first round (3–3), but they won 4–0 in the second leg. The club announced that 13,000 season tickets were sold, a national record.

On August 31, Raja was knocked-out from the Throne Cup by RCA Zemamra (3–2). The defense was heavily criticized, particularly Salif Coulibaly, whose contract was terminated a few days later. On September 13, the club announced the return of Sanad Al Warfali, who played on loan the previous season. On October 11, sporting director Fathi Jamal resigned. On November 11, two days after a loss against Youssoufia Berrechid (2–3), Carteron was replaced by Jamal Sellami, a former Raja player who had served as assistant coach in 2007. On November 23, in the second leg of the Arab Club Champions Cup round of 16 against Wydad, Sellami's first match, Raja were losing 4–1. Within fifteen minutes, Ahaddad scored, Moutouali converted a Panenka penalty in the 88th minute, before Malango completed a historic comeback, scoring the equalizer in the 94th minute. Raja thus eliminated their rivals in the first Derby played in an international competition. With two goals and an assist, Moutouali was unanimously named Man of the Match.

On 11 October 2020, the Greens won their twelfth Botola. As leaders, they hosted AS FAR on the final match and needed a win to secure the title. Meanwhile, Wydad traveled to face Fath US. The first half ended 1–1 in Rabat, while Raja trailed 0–1. In the 62nd minute, Hafidi equalized. In the 88th minute, Wydad scored the winner, putting them ahead, before Hafidi struck again in the 90th minute, securing the trophy. On October 17, they lost 0–1 at home to Zamalek SC in the Champions League semifinal. After the match, most of the players tested positive for SARS-CoV-2. Faced with the impossibility of leaving the country, CAF postponed the match to November 4. After taking the lead and dominating their opponent for the first sixty minutes, the players, lacking physical freshness due to the virus, collapsed and allowed the Egyptians to overturn the score (3–1).

=== Tenth international trophy ===
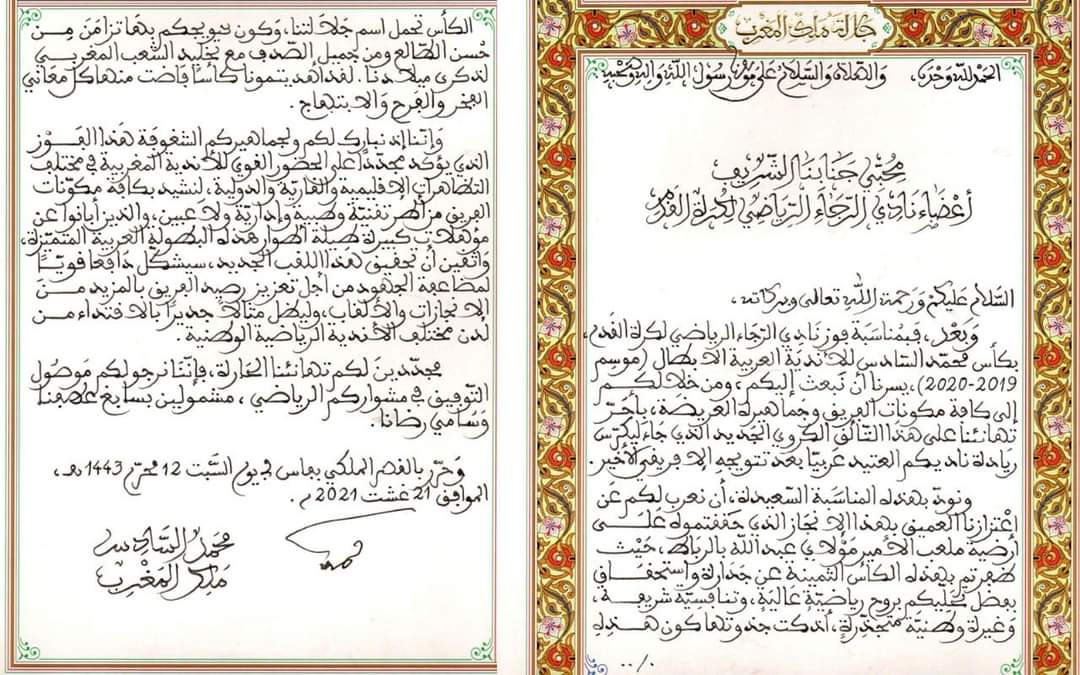
King Mohammed VI congratulations following Raja's victory in the 2019–20 Arab Club Champions Cup, named after him.

On 15 November, Jawad Ziyat convened his board members to inform them of his decision to resign. On 14 December, Rachid Andaloussi took over as interim president. This period was marked by the arrivals of Marouane Hadhoudi and Noah Sadaoui, and the departures of Badr Benoun and Hamid Ahaddad. On 5 January 2021, Raja suffered a shocking elimination in the Champions League against Teungueth FC on penalties (0–0). Due to violent storms, Raja played the second leg at the Stade Mohammed V on a waterlogged pitch that "looked more like a swimming pool than a football pitch", resulting in their elimination. On April 6, Jamal Sellami resigned. His assistant Mohamed Bekkari, took over as interim manager for two matches, including a 3–0 away victory against Pyramids FC. On 13 April, the club presented their new manager, Lassaad Chabbi. After their exit from the Champions League, they were relegated to the CAF Confederation Cup, where they reached the group stage at the expense of US Monastir. The Greens won all six of their matches, scoring 13 goals and conceding none. They became the first team in the history of African competitions to win all their group matches without conceding a single goal.

On 10 July, Raja secured the title after defeating JS Kabylie at Stade de l’Amitié (2–1, goals of Rahimi and Malango), despite being down to ten men after Omar Arjoune's expulsion, and claimed its ninth international title. However, they were eliminated in the quarterfinals of the Throne Cup on penalties and finished runners-up of Botola. On August 21, they won the Arab Club Champions Cup, defeating Ittihad FC on penalties after a 4–4 thrilling final. Raja earned the $6,000,000 prize, 698 days after their first match in the competition against Hilal Al-Quds in September 2019.

=== Two–season trophy drought ===
The summer transfer window saw the departure of key players like Soufiane Rahimi, Ben Malango, Abderrahim Achchakir and Sanad Al Warfali. The most notable signings were Jamal Harkass, Hamid Ahaddad, Mohamed Nahiri and Moustapha Kouyaté. On 21 October 2021, the club presented Patrick De Wilde as new sporting director. On 27 October, after the approval of the financial reports, the assembly appointed Anis Mahfoud as new president. The 43-year-old lawyer, who had served as general-secretary under Ziyat, was elected with 95 votes, ahead of Jamaleddine Khalfaoui (44) and Redouane Rami (17).

On November 9, the club sacked Lassaad Chabbi and hired Marc Wilmots. On December 22, Raja lost the African Super Cup on penalties to Al Ahly SC after a 1–1 draw. In addition to the departure of the trio Abdelilah Hafidi, Omar Boutayeb, and Mahmoud Benhalib, Kadima Kabangu, Béni Badibanga, Gaya Merbah, Marouane Fakhr and Abdessamad Badaoui, among others, arrived at Oasis in January. On 20 February 2022, Wilmots was dismissed due to poor results. Mohamed Bekkari served as interim manager until the arrival of Rachid Taoussi on February 28, who signed an 18-month contract. On February 24, the government announced the reopening of stadiums to the public. Raja faced Horoya AC in the Champions League on February 25 at the Stade Mohammed V after two years of empty stands. The Ultras groups boycotted the game. Some 10,000 fans attended Raja's victory thanks to a goal by Mohsine Moutouali (1–0). Raja broke their record for consecutive Champions League wins, with 5 victories. Raja brought a tumultuous campaign to a close with a second-place finish and quarterfinal exits in both the Champions League and the Throne Cup. Having gone through three presidents and four managers, the club finished without a title for the first time in five years.

On 16 June 2022, following the resignation of Anis Mahfoud, Aziz El Badraoui was unanimously elected president. Ten players left the club, and about fifteen joined under the new coaching of Faouzi Benzarti. After a poor Botola start, the Tunisian manager resigned and was replaced by his compatriot Mondher Kebaier, who secured the season's first win against ASN Nigelec in the Champions League (0–2). Despite a historic group stage in terms of points and goals scored, the team missed out on the Botola title. They were once again eliminated in the quarter-finals against Al Ahly.✅

== Boudrika's second term (2023–2025) ==
=== The invincibles ===
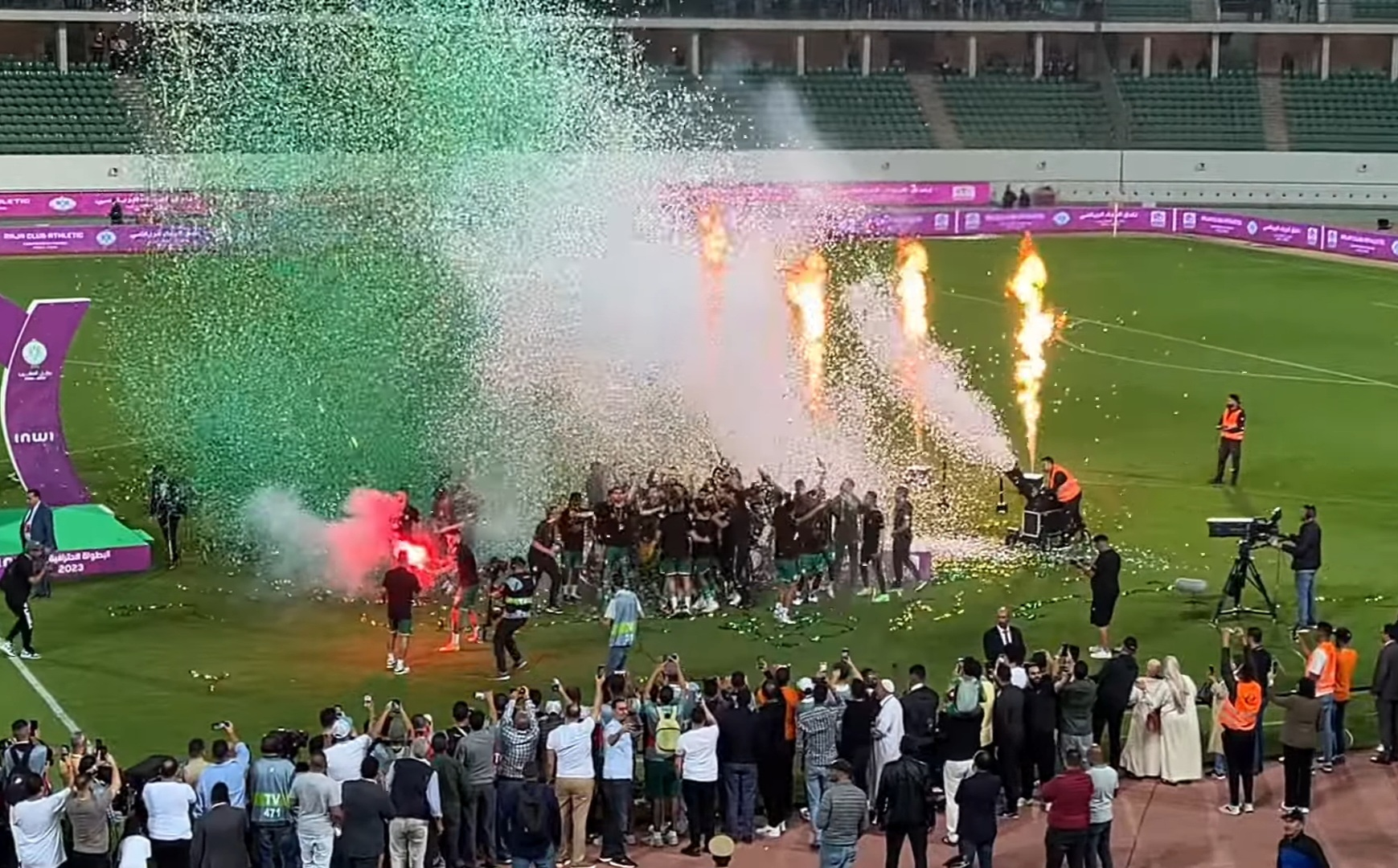
Raja players celebrating the first invincible title in Botola's history

On 26 May 2023, Aziz El Badraoui resigned and Mohamed Boudrika succeeded him, defeating Said Hasbane in the elections. Mondher Kebaier was replaced by Josef Zinnbauer, the first German manager in the club's history. He succeeded in his first challenge, beating Wydad in the Throne Cup semi-final. In the final against RS Berkane, despite Marouane Hadhoudi's early dismissal and a penalty overturned by VAR, the Greens lost to a 108th-minute penalty. A month later, the team traveled to Saudi Arabia to defend their Arab Club Champions Cup title. They won all their group matches, against Al-Wahda, CR Belouizdad and Kuwait SC, but lost to Cristiano Ronaldo's Al Nassr, who opened the scoring after Raja missed many chances (3–1).

Raja made history during the 2023–24 season by winning an undefeated domestic double, finishing with a record of 26 wins and 9 draws. The Greens chased AS FAR all season long until the penultimate match when Adam Ennafati scored a last-minute free kick in the Derby, sending them into the first place. On 14 June 2024, they secured the title after beating Mouloudia Oujda (0–3), breaking the points record with 72 points. On 1 July, Raja extended their incredible winning streak to 14 matches with a victory over AS FAR in the Throne Cup's final to secure the third double in its history.

=== From hero to zero ===
On 19 July 2024, Adil Hala took over as interim president following Boudrika's arrest in Germany. On 12 September, he was elected president. His management quickly turned into a disaster for a club that had just enjoyed a historic season. The squad was severely undermined by an awful transfer window, the exit of Zinnbauer along with key players, and rampant managerial instability featuring five managers in the season. After going undefeated for more than a year, Raja lost their first league match. They finished fifth and exited the Throne Cup's round of 16 against a Botola 2 team, while their Champions League campaign cut short, missing out on the knockout rounds by a whisker. On 30 January 2025, Abdellah Birouaine became interim president after Hala's resignation. On 12 April 2025, Raja finally returned to the Stade Mohammed V after 18 months of renovations.

== The sports company (since 2025) ==
On 7 July 2025, Raja's Parliament elected Jawad Ziyat and unanimously approved the activation of the sports company through a partnership with its long-standing sponsor, Marsa Maroc. On 2 August, Ziyat and Driss Agoujjim, CFO of Marsa Maroc and president of Ports4Impact, signed a ten-year partnership activating Raja Club Athletic S.A., in the presence of Fouzi Lekjaa. Ports4Impact, the entity responsible of Marsa Maroc's CSR policy, acquired 60% of the club, with an investment of 150 million dirhams spread over three years, while the Raja association retained 40%. In 1987, Raja began its sponsorship with ODEP, which has become a strong commitment over the years, continued since then by Marsa Maroc. As the majority shareholder, the investor will appoint the president, who will manage the areas in which he has proven expertise, sporting management will remain in the control of the association. On 22 September, Lassaad Chabbi was replaced by Fadlu Davids. The team performed well initially, but its momentum was halted by three defeats in four games. On 13 June 2026, Nasreddine Nabi was appointed. The Tunisian managed to steady the ship and finished the season in the third place, three points behind the champions.
