= 2014–15 Raja CA season =

Raja CA
2014–15 season
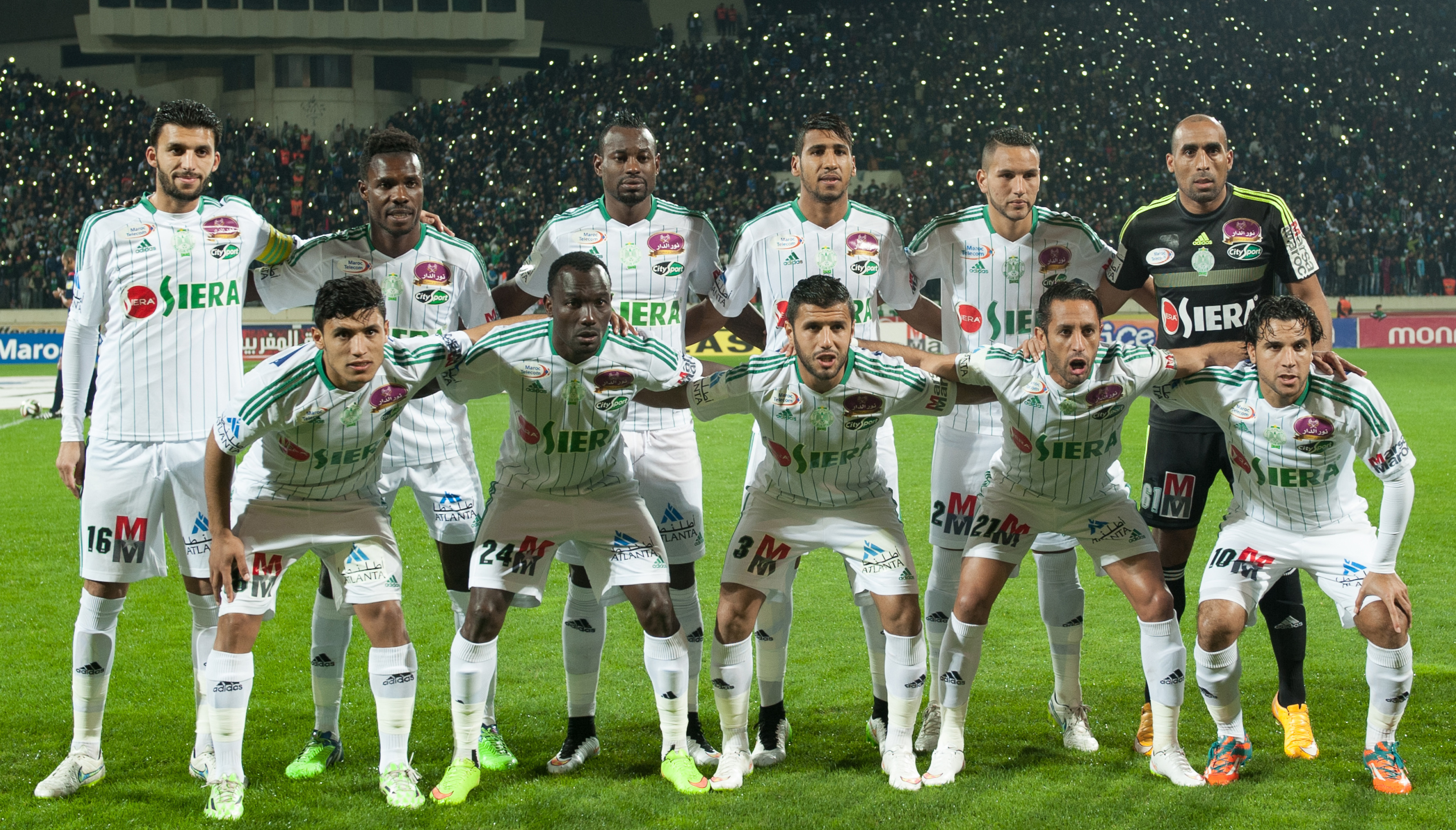
- Raja players against CA Khénifra during a Botola game
- President: Mohamed Boudrika
- Manager: Abdelhak Benchikha (until 23 September); José Romão (from 24 September until 5 May); Fathi Jamal (interim)
- Stadium: Stade Mohamed V
- Botola: 8th
- Coupe du Trône: Round of 16
- CAF Champions League: Second round
- CAF Confederation Cup: Play-off round
- Top goalscorer: League: Abdelilah Hafidi (8); All: Abdelilah Hafidi (9)
- Biggest win: 5–0 v Rachad Bernoussi (Home, 28 August 2014, Throne Cup)
Home colours	Away colours

The 2014–15 season is Raja Club Athletic's 65th season in existence, and the club's 57th consecutive season in the top flight of Moroccan football. They had a quite successful 2013–14 season where despite not winning any silverware they finished as runners-up in the 2013 FIFA Club World Cup, losing the final to Bayern Munich. In addition to this, they finished as runners-up in both of domestic competitions. They finished 2nd of the league after losing on the final day and so finished 3 points behind champions, Moghreb Tetouan. They lost the Throne Cup final 5–4 on penalties in the final to Difaa El Jadida after the first 120 minutes finished level at 0–0. In the CAF Champions League, they were knocked out by Horoya AC, losing 5–4 on penalties after drawing 1–1 on aggregate.

In addition to the domestic league, they played in this season's editions of the Throne Cup, the Champions League and the Confederation Cup. Raja CA kicked off the season with a 1–1 draw against Moghreb Tétouani in the first match of the 2014–15 Botola.

== Squad list ==
No.	Name	Nationality	Position
Goalkeepers
37	Brahim Zaari	(Morocco)	GK
61	Khalid Askri	(Morocco)	GK
22	Mohamed Boujad	(Morocco)	GK
32	Hicham El Allouch	(Morocco)	GK
Defenders
3	Zakaria El Hachimi	(Morocco)	RB
2	Mostafa Belamkadem	(Morocco)	CB
16	Mohamed Oulhaj	(Morocco)	CB
17	Rachid Soulaimani	(Morocco)	RB
21	Adil Karrouchy	(Morocco)	LB
27	Ismail Belmaalem	(Morocco)	CB
30	Ahmed Chagou	(Morocco)	CB
20	Abdeljalil Jbira	(Morocco)	LB
Midfielders
7	Walid Sabbar	(Morocco)	CM
6	Mohammed Ali Bemammer	(Morocco)	CDM
18	Abdelilah Hafidi	(Morocco)	AM/LW
19	Youssef El Gnaoui	(Morocco)	AM/LW
24	Vianney Mabidé	(Central African Republic)	CM/AM
28	Kouko Guehi	(Ivory Coast)	CDM
31	Said Fattah	(Morocco)	CM
Forwards
8	Moussa Bakayoko	(Ivory Coast)	FW
9	Hamza Abourazzouk	(Morocco)	ST
10	Salaheddine Aqqal	(Morocco)	RW
11	Jawad Issine	(Morocco)	FW/LW
14	Lys Mouithys	(Republic of the Congo)	ST
25	Yassine Salhi	(Morocco)	FW/AM
33	Christian Osaguona	(Nigeria)	ST
45	Silvère Ganvoula	(Republic of the Congo)	ST
93	Abdelkbir El Ouadi	(Morocco)	LW

== Transfers ==
=== In ===
Player	Position	Moving from	Date
(Morocco) Youssef El Gnaoui	MF	AS Sale	28 May 2014
(Morocco) Salaheddine Aqqal	FW	FAR Rabat	3 June 2014
(Morocco) Ahmed Chagou	DF	Difaâ El Jadida	9 June 2014
(Morocco) Mohamed Boujad	GK	Chabab Rif Hoceima	
(Morocco) Hicham El Allouch	GK	Olympique Khouribga	
(Morocco) Said Fattah	MF	Wydad AC	
(Morocco) Mohammed Ali Bemammer	MF	Maghreb Fès	
(Morocco) Jawad Issine	FW	Wydad AC	4 July 2014
(Burkina Faso) Yahia Kébé	ST	(Qatar) Al Kharitiyath	25 July 2014
(Republic of the Congo) Silvère Ganvoula	ST	(Republic of the Congo)	14 September 2014
(Republic of the Congo) Lys Mouithys	ST	(Turkey) Ankaraspor	1st September 2014
(Nigeria) Christian Osaguona	ST	(Nigeria) Enugu Rangers	10 January 2015
(Ivory Coast) Moussa Bakayoko	FW	(Ivory Coast) USC Bassam	13 January 2015

=== Out ===
Player	Position	Moving to	Date
(Morocco) Yassine El Had	GK	Released	4 June 2014
(Morocco) Mouhcine Moutouali	FW	(Qatar) Al-Wakrah	8 June 2014
(Morocco) Ismail Kouchame	MF	Kawkab Marrakech	
(Morocco) Issam Erraki	MF	(United Arab Emirates) Emirates Club	
(Morocco) Mouhcine Yajour	FW	Moghreb Tetiouan	
(Mali) Idrissa Coulibaly	DF	Hassania Agadir (loan)	
(Morocco) Merouane Zemmama	MF	Released	
(Burkina Faso) Yahia Kébé	ST	Released	1st November 2014
(Morocco) Said Fattah	MF	(United Arab Emirates) Kalba SC	
(Morocco) Brahim Zaari	GK	Released	
(Morocco) Ismail Benlamaalem	DF	(Qatar) Al-Wakrah SC	
(Republic of the Congo) Lys Mouithys	ST	(Saudi Arabia) Al-Qadsiah	1st January 2015

== Pre-season and friendlies ==
Date	Opponents	Venue	Result	Scorers	Report
26 July 2014	(Spain) RCD Espagnol	Stade Mohamed V, Casablanca	1–1	Belmaalem 35'	Report
2 August 2014	(Spain) Algeciras CF	Estadio Nuevo Mirador, Algésiras	1–0	El Gnaoui 81'	Report
6 August 2014	(Spain) Córdoba CF	Estadio Nuevo Arcángel, Córdoba	0–2		Report
9 August 2014	(Spain) Elche CF	Estadio Martínez Valero, Elche	1–2	Hafidi 47'	Report

== Competitions ==
=== Overview ===
Competition	First match	Last match	Starting round	Final position	Record							
Competition	First match	Last match	Starting round	Final position	Pld	W	D	L	GF	GA	GD	Win %
Botola	23 August 2014	23 May 2015	Matchday 1	8th	30	9	11	10	37	34	+3	30.00
Throne Cup	28 August 2014	24 September 2014	Round of 32	Round of 16	4	2	0	2	9	4	+5	50.00
Champions League	13 February 2015	5 April 2015	Preliminary round	Second round	6	3	3	0	13	6	+7	50.00
Confederation Cup	16 May 2015	7 June 2015	Play-off round	Play-off round	2	1	0	1	2	3	−1	50.00
Total					42	15	14	13	61	47	+14	35.71

Last updated: 7 June 2015
Source: Sofascore

=== Botola ===
==== League table ====
Pos	Team	Pld	W	D	L	GF	GA	GD	Pts	Qualification or relegation
1	Wydad Casablanca (C)	30	16	11	3	48	21	+27	59	Qualification for 2016 CAF Champions League
2	Olympique Khouribga	30	16	8	6	29	17	+12	56	Qualification for 2016 CAF Champions League
3	Kawkab Marrakech	30	13	8	9	31	26	+5	47	Qualification for 2016 CAF Confederation Cup (Note: FUS Rabat qualified for the CAF Confederation Cup as runners-up of the 2015 Moroccan Throne Cup to Olympique Khouribga, who have qualified for the 2016 CAF Champions League.)
4	Moghreb Tétouan	30	11	12	7	36	29	+7	45	
5	FUS Rabat	30	11	12	7	34	28	+6	45	Qualification for 2016 CAF Confederation Cup
6	Hassania Agadir	30	10	10	10	42	46	−4	40	
7	Difaâ El Jadidi	30	10	9	11	26	23	+3	39	
8	Raja CA	30	9	11	10	37	34	+3	38	
9	RSB Berkane	30	6	18	6	25	24	+1	36	
10	Maghreb Fès	30	8	12	10	34	35	−1	36	
11	AS FAR Club	30	7	13	10	31	26	+5	34	
12	Olympic Safi	30	8	10	12	20	35	−15	34	
13	KAC Kénitra	30	8	9	13	25	29	−4	33	
14	Chabab Rif Hoceima	30	7	11	12	26	43	−17	32 (Note: Chabab Rif Hoceima ahead on head-to-head record: Chabab Atlas Khénifra 0-1 Chabab Rif Hoceima (week 11), Chabab Rif Hoceima 1-1 Chabab Atlas Khénifra (week 26))	
15	Chabab Atlas Khénifra (R)	30	8	8	14	23	37	−14	32	Relegation to Botola 2
16	Ittihad Khemisset (R)	30	5	12	13	26	40	−14	27	Relegation to Botola 2

Updated to match(es) played on 24 May 2015. Source: Botola Pro
Rules for classification: 1) points; 2) goal difference; 3) number of goals scored.
(C) Champions; (R) Relegated

==== Matches ====
Date	Opponents	Venue	Result	Scorers	Report
23 August 2014	Moghreb Tétouan	A	1–1	Hafidi 34'	
14 September 2014	Ittihad Khemisset	H	1–0	Kerrouchy 69' (pen.)	
21 September 2014	AS FAR	H	2–1	Mabidé 21' Zekroumi 44' (csc)	
27 September 2014	Difaâ El Jadidi	A	0–3		
19 October 2014	Olympique Safi	H	2–0	Kerrouchy 5' (pen.) Mouithys 62'	
25 October 2014	Hassania Agadir	A	3–5	Mouithys 9', 11'	
31 October 2014	Olympique Khouribga	H	0–0		
8 November 2014	Kénitra AC	A	0–1		
23 November 2014	Maghreb Fès	H	1–1	Hafidi 41'	
30 November 2014	Wydad AC	A	1–2		
7 December 2014	Fath Union Sport	H	1–0	Hafidi 23'	
14 December 2014	Kawkab Marrakech	A	2–1	Mabidé 41' Aqqal 67'	
19 December 2014	Chabab Rif Hoceima	H	4–1	Hafidi 12', 50' Aqqal 22' Bemammer 80'	
28 December 2014	RS Berkane	A	1–1	Abourazzouk 68'	
3 January 2015	Chabab Atlas Khénifra	H	3–0	Mabidé 14' Kerrouchy 30' Hafidi 90+4'	
25 January 2015	Moghreb Tétouan	H	0–1		
1 February 2015	Ittihad Khemisset	A	3–0	Abourazzouk 35' Hafidi 64' (pen.) Osaguona 90+2'	
7 February 2015	AS FAR	A	1–1	Abourazzouk 28'	
18 February 2015	Difaâ El Jadidi	H	0–1		
22 February 2015	Olympique Safi	A	1–1		
7 March 2015	Olympique Khouribga	A	1–0	Jbira 90+4'	
22 March 2015	Maghreb Fès	A	1–2	Salhi 11'	
25 March 2015	Hassania Agadir	H	1–2	Abourazzouk 86'	
11 April 2015	Wydad AC	H	2–2	Osaguona 63' Aqqal 90+2'	
14 April 2015	Kénitra AC	H	0–0		
25 April 2015	Kawkab Marrakech	H	1–1	Salhi 38'	
7 May 2015	Fath Union Sport	A	2–2	Hafidi 19' Guehi 58'	
10 May 2015	Chabab Rif Hoceima	A	1–2	Bakayoko 73'	
19 May 2015	RS Berkane	H	1–1	Jbira 15'	
23 May 2015	Chabab Atlas Khénifra	A	0–1		

=== Throne Cup ===
Date	Opponents	Venue	Result	Scorers	Report
28 August 2014	Rachad Bernoussi	A	5–0	Yahia Kébé 2', 19', 21' Salaheddine Aqqal 10' Jawad Issine 52'	
31 August 2014	Rachad Bernoussi	H	2–0	Vianney Mabidé 17', 47'	
17 September 2014	AS FAR	H	0–1		
24 September 2014	AS FAR	A	2–3	Lys Mouithys 28' Adil Karrouchy 58'	

=== CAF Champions League ===
==== Preliminary round ====
13 February 2015	Raja CA (Morocco)	4–0	(Republic of the Congo) Diables Noirs	Stade Mohamed V, Casablanca
20:00 UTC±0	Guehi 9'; Osaguona 70'; Karrouchy 90'; Jbira 90'	Report		Referee: Mahmoud Ashour (Egypt)

1 March 2015	Diables Noirs (Republic of the Congo)	2–2	(Morocco) Raja CA	Stade Municipal, Pointe-Noire
15:30 UTC+1	Ebengo 83' (pen.); Mvete 87'	Report	Mabidé 41'; Osaguona 55'	Referee: Mal Mohamadou (Cameroon)

==== First round ====
14 March 2015	Kaizer Chiefs (South Africa)	0–1	(Morocco) Raja CA	Moses Mabhida Stadium, Durban
19:00 UTC+2		Report	Osaguona 6'	Referee: Eric Otogo-Castane (Gabon)

5 April 2015	Raja CA (Morocco)	2–0	(South Africa) Kaizer Chiefs	Stade Mohamed V, Casablanca
19:00 UTC+1	Osaguona 86', 90+3'	Report		Referee: Malang Diedhiou (Senegal)

==== Second round ====
19 April 2015	Raja CA (Morocco)	2–2	(Algeria) ES Sétif	Stade Mohamed V, Casablanca
18:30 UTC+1	Salhi 48'; Karrouchy 74' (pen.)	Report	Benyettou 45+2', 65'	Referee: Joseph Lamptey (Ghana)

1 May 2015	ES Sétif (Algeria)	2–2 (4–1 p)	(Morocco) Raja CA	Stade 8 Mai 1945, Sétif
18:00 UTC+1	Belameiri 7'; Delhoum 47'	Report	Hafidi 58'; Karrouchy 90+3'	Referee: Mohamed Said Kordi (Tunisia)
	Penalties
	Delhoum (penalty scored); Benyettou (penalty scored); Zerara (penalty scored); Lamri (penalty scored)		(penalty missed) Guehi; (penalty missed) Hafidi; (penalty scored) Salhi

=== Confederation Cup ===
16 May 2015	Raja CA (Morocco)	2–0	(Tunisia) Étoile du Sahel	Stade Mohamed V, Casablanca
19:00 UTC+1	El Ouadi 23'; Osaguona 44'	Report		Referee: Eric Otogo-Castane (Gabon)

7 June 2015	Étoile du Sahel (Tunisia)	3–0	(Morocco) Raja CA	Stade Olympique de Sousse, Sousse
19:15 UTC+1	Jemal 20'; Bounedjah 25'; Brigui 72'	Report		Referee: Joshua Bondo (Botswana)

== Squad information ==
=== Goals ===
Includes all competitive matches. The list is sorted alphabetically by surname when total goals are equal.

Rank	Pos.	Player	Botola	Throne Cup	Champions league	Confederation Cup	Total
1	AM	(Morocco) Abdelilah Hafidi	8	0	1	0	9
2	FW	(Nigeria) Christian Osaguona	2	0	5	1	8
3	DF	(Morocco) Adil Karrouchy	3	1	3	0	7
4	MF	(Central African Republic) Vianney Mabidé	3	2	1	0	6
5	FW	(Republic of the Congo) Lys Mouithys	3	1	0	0	4
6	FW	(Morocco) Salaheddine Aqqal	3	1	0	0	4
7	FW	(Morocco) Hamza Abourazzouk	4	0	0	0	4
8	FW	(Morocco) Yassine Salhi	2	0	1	0	3
9	DF	(Mali) Yahia Kébé	0	3	0	0	3
10	DF	(Morocco) Abdeljalil Jbira	2	0	1	0	3
11	MF	(Ivory Coast) Kouko Guehi	1	0	1	0	2
12	FW	(Morocco) Jawad Issine	0	1	0	0	1
13	MF	(Morocco) Mohammed Ali Bemammer	1	0	0	0	1
14	FW	(Morocco) Abdelkabir El Ouadi	0	0	0	1	1
15	FW	(Ivory Coast) Moussa Bakayoko	1	0	0	0	1
Own goals			4	0	0	0	4
Total			37	9	13	2	61

=== Assists ===
Rank	Pos.	Player	Botola	Throne Cup	Champions league	Confederation Cup	Total
1	FW	(Morocco) Yassine Salhi	3	0	1	1	5
2	FW	(Morocco) Salaheddine Aqqal	3	2	0	0	5
3	DF	(Morocco) Adil Karrouchy	3	1	0	0	4
4	AM	(Morocco) Abdelilah Hafidi	2	0	2	0	4
5	FW	(Morocco) Youssef El Gnaoui	1	1	1	0	3
6	DF	(Morocco) Zakaria El Hachimi	1	1	0	0	2
7	MF	(Central African Republic) Vianney Mabidé	1	1	0	0	2
8	FW	(Republic of the Congo) Lys Mouithys	2	0	0	0	2
9	FW	(Morocco) Hamza Abourazzouk	2	0	0	0	2
10	FW	(Mali) Yahia Kébé	0	2	0	0	2
11	FW	(Nigeria) Christian Osaguona	1	0	0	0	1
12	MF	(Ivory Coast) Kouko Guehi	1	0	0	0	1
13	FW	(Morocco) Jawad Issine	0	0	1	0	1
14	FW	(Morocco) Anouar El Ghaouta	1	0	0	0	1
