= Mustapha Chadili =

Moroccan footballer

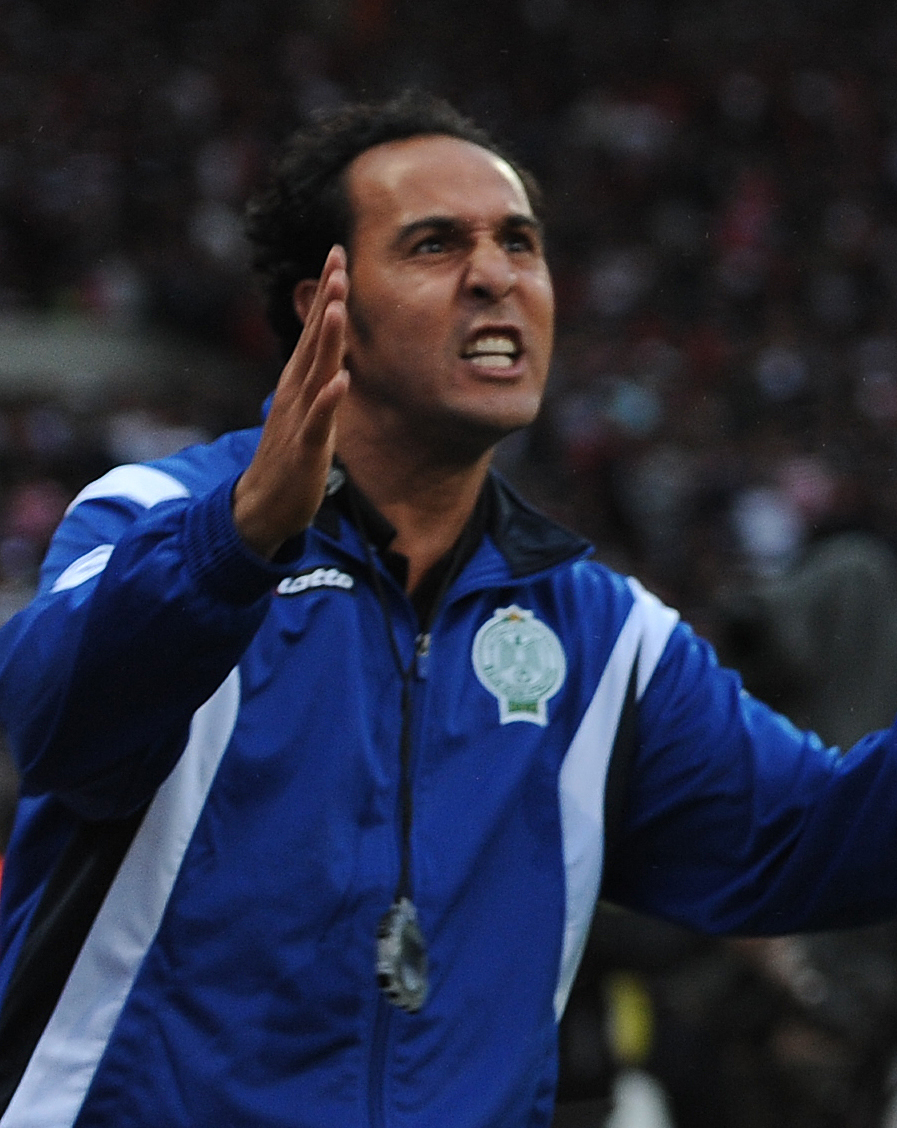

Personal information
- Date of birth: February 14, 1973 (age 53)
- Place of birth: Casablanca, Morocco
- Height: 1.78 m (5 ft 10 in)
- Position: Goalkeeper

Senior career*
Years	Team	Apps	(Gls)
1992–1995	Olympique de Casablanca		
1995–2005	Raja Casablanca	505	(0)
2005–2009	Moghreb Tétouan	95	(0)
2009–2011	FAR Rabat	11	(0)

International career^{‡}
1998–2006	Morocco	3	(0)
- * Club domestic league appearances and goals as of 20:33, 21 May 2010 (UTC) ‡ National team caps and goals as of 20:33, 21 May 2010 (UTC)

Mustapha Chadili (Arabic: مصطفى الشاذلي) (born 14 February 1973 in Casablanca) is a retired Moroccan football goalkeeper who played for Raja Casablanca.

Chadili played for Raja Casablanca at the 2000 FIFA Club World Championship.

He played for the Morocco national football team and was a participant at the 1998 FIFA World Cup.

== Honors ==
Raja Casablanca

- Moroccan League (7): 1996, 1997, 1998, 1999, 2000, 2001, 2004
- Coupe du Trône (3): 1996, 2002, 2005
- CAF Champions league (2): 1997, 1999 runner-up: 2002
- Afro-Asian Club Championship: 1998
- CAF Confederation Cup: 2003
- CAF Super Cup: 2000 runner-up : 1998

AS FAR

- Coupe du Trône: 2009

Individual

- Best goalkeeper in CAF Champions League (3): 1997, 1999, 2002
- Best goalkeeper in Moroccan League (2): 2001, 2003
- The only goalkeeper in African history to have kept a clean sheet in 13 consecutive matches
- The Moroccan goalkeeper with the most titles and the second in Africa
