= 2021 CAF Champions League =

2021 CAF Champions League may refer to:

- 2020–21 CAF Champions League
- 2021–22 CAF Champions League
