= Ahmed Chagou =

Moroccan professional footballer

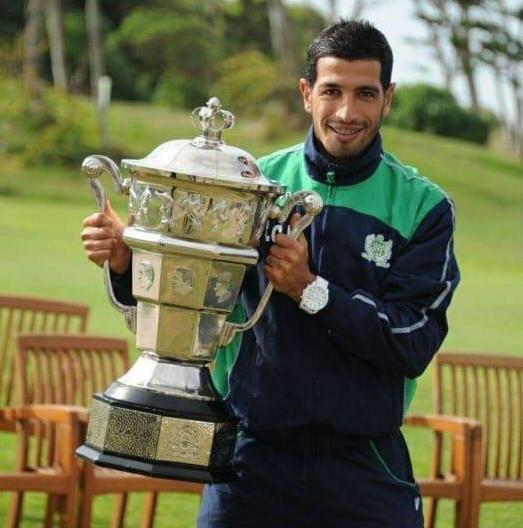

Personal information
- Date of birth: 27 November 1987 (age 38)
- Place of birth: Casablanca, Morocco
- Height: 1.82 m (6 ft 0 in)
- Position: Centre back

Senior career*
Years	Team	Apps	(Gls)
2007–2009	Rachad Bernoussi		
2009–2014	Difaâ El Jadida	101	(9)
2014–2015	Raja Casablanca	13	(0)
2015–2017	Kawkab Marrakech	56	(6)
2017–2019	RAC Casablanca		
2019–2020	Ittihad Khemisset		

International career
2012	Morocco	1	(0)
- * Club domestic league appearances and goals as of 14 March 2018

Ahmed Chagou is a Moroccan professional footballer, who plays as a defender.

== International career ==
In January 2014, coach Hassan Benabicha, invited him to be a part of the Morocca squad for the 2014 African Nations Championship. He helped the team to top group B after drawing with Burkina Faso and Zimbabwe and defeating Uganda. The team was eliminated from the competition at the quarter-final zone after losing to Nigeria.
