= Fathi Jamal =

Moroccan footballer (born 1959)

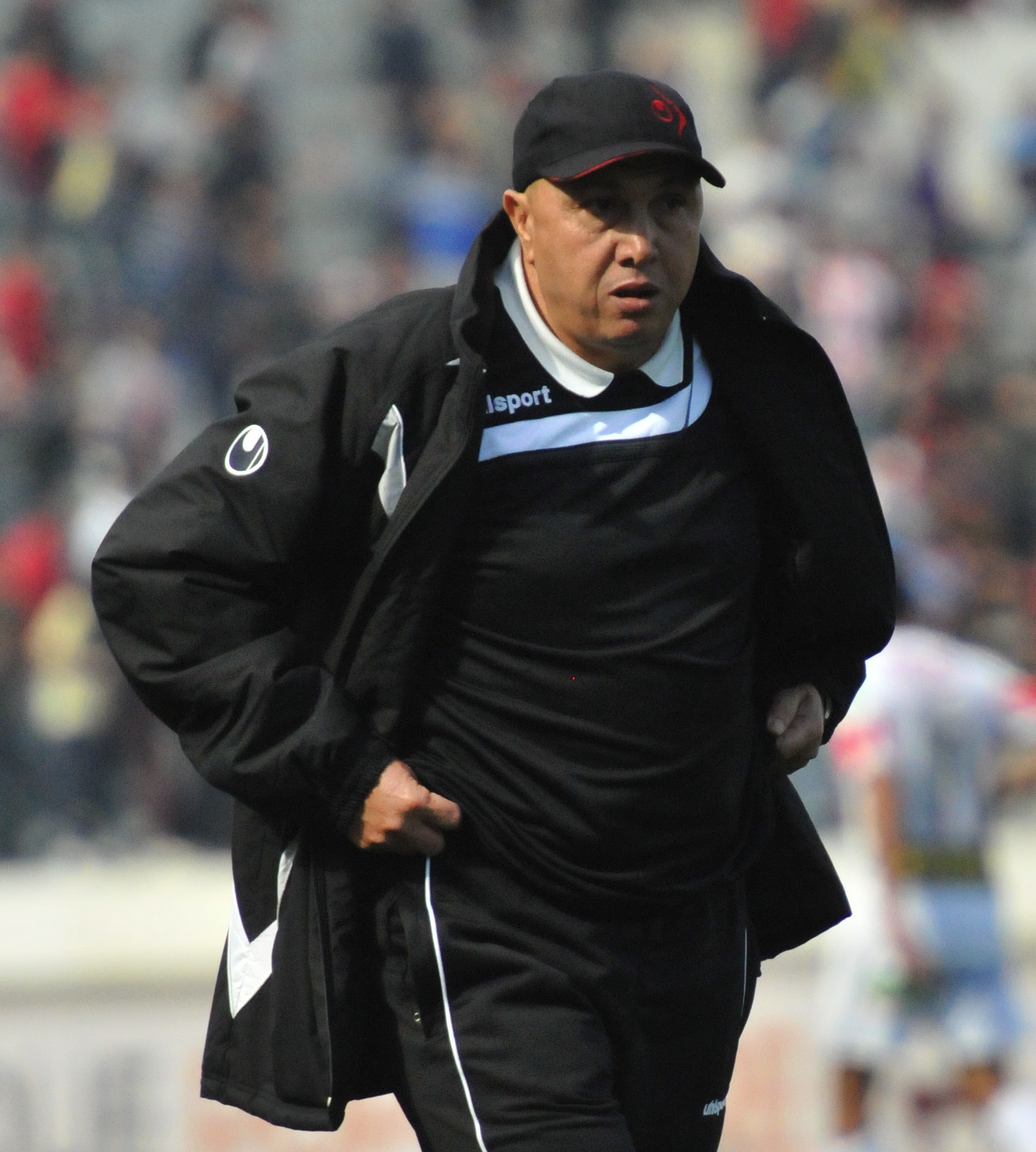

Fathi Jamal (born 11 February 1959, in Casablanca) is a Moroccan football coach and former player. He played most of his career for Raja Casablanca, JSM Laayoune and Kawkab Marrakech. After retiring as a player, he coached many teams, most notably Morocco's youth team that finished 4th at the 2005 FIFA World Youth Championship. He also coached Morocco's senior team in 2008 and Kawkab Marrakech afterwards.

In November 2011, Jamal was named head coach of FAR Rabat and took over the helm of Widad Fez in June 2013. He currently works as the scout of national team.
