= Christian Osaguona =

Nigerian footballer

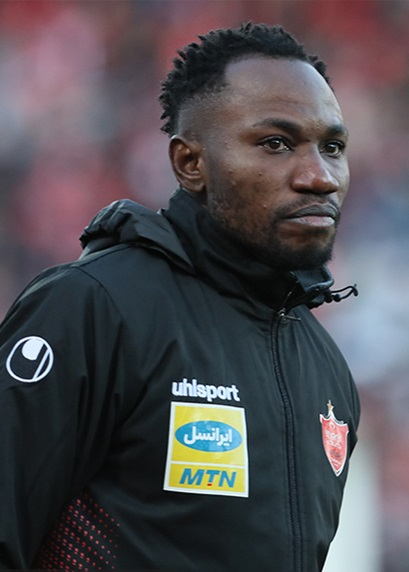
- Osaguona with Persepolis F.C. in 2020

Personal information
- Full name: Ighodaro Christian Osaguona
- Date of birth: 10 October 1990 (age 36)
- Place of birth: Edo State, Nigeria
- Height: 1.94 m (6 ft 4 in)
- Position: Forward

Senior career*
Years	Team	Apps	(Gls)
2011–2012	Buffles Parakou	40	(7)
2011–2013	Shooting Stars	58	(11)
2013–2014	Enugu Rangers	48	(17)
2014– 2016	Raja Casablanca	17	(14)
2016–2017	KV Mechelen	15	(1)
2017–2018	Westerlo	28	(5)
2018	Umm Salal	2	(1)
2019	Zob Ahan	13	(1)
2019-2020	Jeju United	11	(1)
2020	Persepolis	7	(1)
2020–2021	Al-Shorta	10	(2)

International career^{‡}
2014–2015	Nigeria	5	(0)
- * Club domestic league appearances and goals as of 7 August 2020 ‡ National team caps and goals as of 17 May 2015

Ighodaro Christian Osaguona (born 10 October 1990) is a Nigerian footballer who most recently played for Al-Shorta in the Iraqi Premier League as a striker.

== Club career ==
=== Persepolis ===
On 13 January 2020, Osaguona signed a half-season contract with Persian Gulf Pro League champions Persepolis. Also, the Iranian Reds hold an option to extend his deal for a further year.

=== Al-Shorta ===
On 9 September 2020, the striker left Persepolis to sign a contract with Al-Shorta in the Iraqi Premier League.

== International career ==
Osaguona was called up for national team for 2015 Africa Cup of Nations qualification matches and played his first international game with the senior national team on 10 September 2014 in and against South Africa (0–0), after he came on as a substitute for Gbolahan Salami in the 63rd minute of that game.

== Honours ==
Persepolis

- Persian Gulf Pro League: 2019–20
