= Vianney Mabidé =

Central African Republic footballer

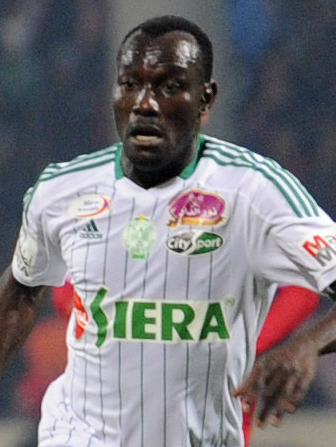
- Mabidé with Raja CA in 2015

Personal information
- Full name: Vianney Vivien Mabidé
- Date of birth: 31 August 1988 (age 38)
- Place of birth: Bangui, Central African Republic
- Height: 1.78 m (5 ft 10 in)
- Position: Midfielder

Team information
- Current team: Kawkab Marrakech

Senior career*
Years	Team	Apps	(Gls)
2006–2007	US Bitam		
2007–2008	AS Mangasport		
2008–2010	US Bitam		
2010–2011	Difaa El Jadida	40	(4)
2012	→ Al-Taawon (loan)	27	(0)
2012–2015	Raja CA	113	(23)
2015–2018	Moghreb Tétouan	48	(1)
2017	→ Al Ahli Tripoli (loan)	10	(1)
2019–	Kawkab Marrakech		

International career^{‡}
2010–	Central African Republic	25	(5)
- * Club domestic league appearances and goals as of 13 November 2019 ‡ National team caps and goals as of 25 February 2019

Vianney Vivien Mabidé (born 31 August 1988) is a Central African footballer who plays for Moroccan club Kawkab Marrakech. He was called up to Central African football team, competing at the 2012 Africa Cup of Nations qualification, where he scored one goal.

== Club career ==
=== Raja Casablanca ===
Mabidé signed a three-year contract with Raja Casablanca on 11 July 2012 for 2.5million dirham. During the 2013 FIFA Club World Cup Semi-finals match against Atlético Mineiro, he scored the third goal in a 3–1 victory that saw Raja progress to the Final against Bayern Munich.

Before the semifinal of 2013 FIFA Club World Cup, when Raja would face Brazilian side Atlético Mineiro, Mabidé spoke about Ronaldinho and caused a huge controversy. According to him: "I already faced Messi, how can I fear Ronaldinho? He is no more the same Ronaldinho from Barcelona times." Ironically, he scored, in the victory of 3–1 over Brazilians, the last goal of the game, what permitted Raja in the final. After the game, reducing the controversy, Mabidé spoke these words: "He (Ronaldinho) is no more the same player from Barcelona times. But he is still a great player."

== Career statistics ==
=== Club ===
As of 21 December 2013

Club performance			League		Cup		Continental (Note: "Continental" appearances include CAF, UAFA and AFC competitions)		Other (Note: "Other" appearances include FIFA Club World Cup)		Total	
Season	Club	League	Apps	Goals	Apps	Goals	Apps	Goals	Apps	Goals	Apps	Goals
2010–11	Difaa El Jadida	Botola	23	1					-		23	1
2011–12	Difaa El Jadida	Botola	15	2					-		15	2
2011–12	Al-Taawon (loan)	Zain Saudi League	7	0	-		-		-		7	0
2012–13	Raja Casablanca	Botola	19	3	5	0	4	0	-		29	3
2013–14	Raja Casablanca	Botola	9	0	3	0			4	1	16	1
Total	Gabon						-					
Total	Morocco		66	6	8	0	4	0	4	1	82	7
Total	Saudi Arabia		7	0	-		-		-		7	0
Career total			73	6	8	0	4	0	4	1	89	7

=== International goals ===
Scores and results list Central African Republic's goal tally first

No.	Date	Venue	Opponent	Score	Result	Competition
1.	26 March 2011	Benjamin Mkapa National Stadium, Dar es Salaam	Tanzania	1–0	1–2	2012 Africa Cup of Nations qualification
2.	8 September 2012	Barthelemy Boganda Stadium, Bangui	Burkina Faso	1–0	1–0	2013 Africa Cup of Nations qualification
3.	6 September 2015	Barthelemy Boganda Stadium, Bangui	DR Congo	1–0	2–0	2017 Africa Cup of Nations qualification
4.	5 June 2016	Barthelemy Boganda Stadium, Bangui	Angola	1–0	3–1	2017 Africa Cup of Nations qualification
5.	13 November 2019	Barthelemy Boganda Stadium, Bangui	Burundi	1–0	2–0	2021 Africa Cup of Nations qualification

== Honours ==
Raja Casablanca

- Botola (1): 2012-13
