= Lys Mouithys =

Congolese footballer (born 1985)

Personal information
- Full name: Dyzaiss-Lys Mouithys Mickalad
- Date of birth: 4 July 1985 (age 41)
- Place of birth: Brazzaville, Republic of the Congo
- Height: 1.85 m (6 ft 1 in)
- Position: Forward

Senior career*
Years	Team	Apps	(Gls)
2000–2003	Stade Briochin	1	(0)
2003–2006	Bordeaux B	39	(9)
2006	Châtellerault	9	(0)
2007	Hyères	2	(0)
2007–2008	Cherbourg	30	(3)
2008–2009	Libourne-Saint Seurin	21	(11)
2009–2010	Wydad Casablanca	25	(10)
2010–2011	Chernomorets Burgas	11	(2)
2011–2013	Wydad Casablanca	29	(5)
2013–2014	Ankaraspor	9	(2)
2014–2015	Raja Casablanca	13	(5)
2015	Al-Qadisiyah FC		
2016	Suwaiq Club		
2016	AS Cozes	6	(1)
2016–	Angoulême	10	(3)

International career^{‡}
2006–2013	Republic of the Congo	21	(4)
- * Club domestic league appearances and goals as of 19:59, 1 March 2019 (UTC) ‡ National team caps and goals as of 19:59, 1 March 2019 (UTC)

Dyzaiss-Lys Mouithys Mickalad (born 4 July 1985) is a Congolese footballer who plays for Angoulême CFC.
