= Salaheddine Aqqal =

Moroccan football midfielder

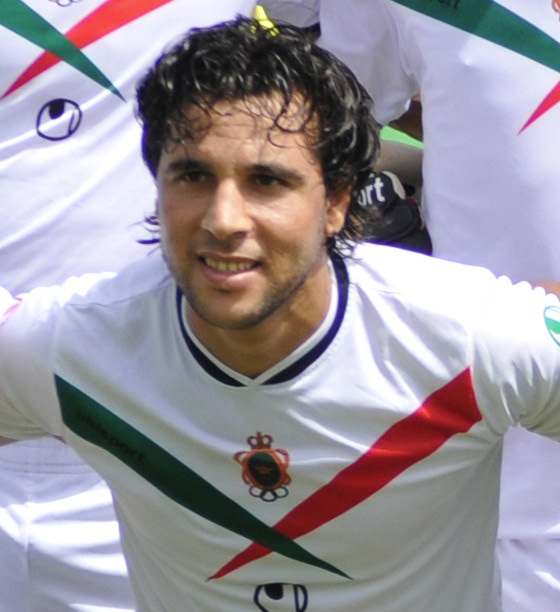
- Salaheddine el Aqqal with Far Rabat, August 2012

Personal information
- Full name: Salaheddine Aqqal
- Date of birth: 22 August 1984 (age 42)
- Place of birth: Khouribga, Morocco
- Height: 1.68 m (5 ft 6 in)
- Position: Midfielder

Senior career*
Years	Team	Apps	(Gls)
2003–2005	Olympique Khouribga		
2005–2006	Al-Hazem		
2006–2007	Al-Ta'ee		
2007–2009	Al-Ettifaq		
2009–2010	Al-Hazem	18	(6)
2010–2011	Al-Raed	23	(6)
2011–2012	Al-Taawon	21	(4)
2012–2014	FAR Rabat	22	(14)
2014-2015	Raja CA	21	(3)
2015-2016	Kawkab Marrakech		

International career
2012–2014	Morocco	2	(0)
- * Club domestic league appearances and goals as of 1 June 2013

Salaheddine Aqqal (Arabic: صلاح الدين عقال; born 22 August 1984) is a retired Moroccan football midfielder.

Aqqal played for the Moroccan team in the Under-20 African Nations Cup in 2003. In 2004, he was playing for Olympic Club de Khouribga (OCK). He was part of the Moroccan 2004 Olympic football team, who exited in the first round, finishing third in group D, behind group winners Iraq and runners-up Costa Rica. In 2005, he captained the Moroccan team at the Mediterranean Games in Almería.
