= 2007–08 Raja CA season =

Raja CA
2007–08 season
- President: Abdellah Rhallam
- Manager: Jean-Yves Chay
- Stadium: Stade Mohamed V
- Botola: 3rd
- Moroccan Throne Cup: Quarter final
- Arab Champions league: Group stage
- Top goalscorer: League: Andre Senghor (8); All: Andre Senghor (9)
- Biggest win: 3–0 v JS Massira (Home, 10 February 2008, Botola)

The 2007–08 season is Raja Club Athletic's 59th season in existence and the club's 52nd consecutive season in the top flight of Moroccan football. In addition to the domestic league, they are also participating in this season's editions of the Throne Cup and the Arab Champions league. This is the first season since 1999–00 without Hicham Aboucherouane who joined ES Tunis and the first since 2002–03 without Soufiane Alloudi who joined Al-Ain on loan on 17 September 2007.

Raja CA kicked off the season with a 1–1 away draw against Olympique Khouribga in the first round of Botola.

== Squad ==
Note: Flags indicate national team as defined under FIFA eligibility rules; some limited exceptions apply. Players may hold more than one non-FIFA nationality.

No.	Pos.	Nation	Player
1	GK	MAR	Mohammed Amine El Bourkadi
3	DF	MAR	Zakaria Zerouali
4	FW	MAR	Abderrahim Chkilit
5	FW	MAR	Mohsine Moutouali
6	DF	MAR	Yassine Remch
8	DF	MAR	Abdellatif Jrindou (captain)
9	FW	SEN	Pape Ciré Dia
10	MF	MAR	Abdessamad Ouhakki
12	GK	MAR	Khalid Fouhami
13	MF	MAR	Omar Nejjary
14	DF	MAR	Mehdi Azouar
15	DF	MAR	Hicham El Amrani
16	MF	MAR	Mohamed Oulhaj
17	MF	MAR	Rachid Soulaimani
18	DF	MAR	Mourad Ainy
19	MF	MAR	Hicham Misbah

No.	Pos.	Nation	Player
20	MF	MAR	Hassan Daoudi
21	MF	MAR	Moulay Abdellah Jlaidi
22	GK	MAR	Yassine El Had
23	DF	MAR	Abdelouahed Chakhsi
24	FW	CMR	Eustache Wanssi
25	FW	MAR	Hassan Tair
26	MF	MAR	Said Fettah
27	FW	SEN	André Senghor
29	FW	MAR	Abdelali Semlali
—	FW	MAR	Zakaria Jaouhari
—	MF	MAR	Reda Sakim
—	FW	MAR	Khalid Sbai
—	FW	MAR	Jamaleddine Malki
—	MF	MAR	Hossein Rajallah
—	FW	CIV	Yaya Traoré
—	FW	GUI	Mohamed Sylla

== Pre-season ==
On 22 July 2007, the club headed to Ifrane for a 12-day closed camp to prepare for the upcoming season. They stayed at the Al Akhawayn University campus.

On 1 August 2007, Raja CA announced that they will establish their final summer camp in Switzerland. They will also take part in the Arab Summer Cup, a friendly tournament organized in Nyon by the Arab Radio and Television Network (ART). Raja won the tournament, which also included Al-Hilal FC of Saudi Arabia, Al Ain Club of the United Arab Emirates, and Kuwait SC of Kuwait.

=== Friendly games ===
Date	Opponents	Venue	Result	Scorers	Report
20 July 2007	Fath US	Casablanca	0–0		Report
2 August 2008	Fath US	Ifrane	1–0	Hassan Tair	Report
24 August 2008	Chabab Mohammedia	Mohammedia	4–0	Soufiane Alloudi Sylla Ouhaki	Report
29 August 2008	Union Touarga	Casablanca	1–0	Abdessamad Ouhaki 30'	Report
31 August 2008	Kawkab Marrakech	El Jadida	1–1 (2–4p)		Report
1 September 2008	Fath US	El Jadida	1–0		Report
15 September 2008	Union Mohammedia	Mohammedia	2–1		Report
17 September 2008	Racing AC	Casablanca	1–0		Report

=== Arab Summer Cup ===
Date	Round	Opponents	Venue	Result	Scorers	Report
13 August 2007	Match 1	(Saudi Arabia) Al-Hilal FC	Nyon, Switzerland	3–1	Soudiane Alloudi Mouhcine Iajour Hassan Tair	Report
15 August 2007	Match 2	(United Arab Emirates) Al Ain Club	Nyon, Switzerland	1–1 (1–3p)	Soufiane Alloudi	Report
17 August 2007	Match 3	Kuwait SC	Nyon, Switzerland	0–0 (1–4p)		Report

== Competitions ==
=== Overview ===
Competition	First match	Last match	Starting round	Final position	Record							
Competition	First match	Last match	Starting round	Final position	Pld	W	D	L	GF	GA	GD	Win %
Botola	13 September 2007	14 June 2008	Matchday 1	3rd	30	12	12	6	32	23	+9	40.00
Throne Cup	1 March 2008	10 May 2008	Round of 32	Quarter-final	3	1	1	1	5	5	+0	33.33
Arab Champions League	25 October 2007	2 March 2008	Round of 32	Group stage	8	2	5	1	8	7	+1	25.00
Total					41	15	18	8	45	35	+10	36.59

Last updated: 14 June 2008
Source: RSSSF

=== Botola ===
==== League table ====
Pos	Team	Pld	W	D	L	GF	GA	GD	Pts	Qualification or relegation
1	FAR Rabat	30	14	11	5	36	23	+13	53	2009 CAF Champions League
2	Ittihad Khemisset	30	14	8	8	34	23	+11	50	2009 CAF Champions League
3	Raja CA	30	12	12	6	32	23	+9	48	2008–09 Arab Champions League
4	Hassania Agadir	30	11	13	6	23	14	+9	46	2008–09 Arab Champions League
5	Difaa El Jadida	30	12	10	8	29	26	+3	46	
6	OC Khouribga	30	10	13	7	32	36	−4	43	
7	Moghreb Tétouan	30	10	12	8	29	19	+10	42	
8	Wydad Casablanca	30	10	12	8	28	23	+5	42	2008–09 Arab Champions League
9	Jeunesse Massira	30	8	14	8	27	28	−1	38	
10	Olympique Safi	30	8	12	10	31	31	0	36	
11	Maghreb Fez	30	9	9	12	27	30	−3	36	2009 CAF Confederation Cup
12	Kawkab Marrakech	30	6	15	9	23	31	−8	33	
13	KAC Kenitra	30	6	13	11	20	33	−13	31	
14	Mouloudia Oujda	30	8	7	15	29	48	−19	31	
15	FUS Rabat	30	4	14	12	23	30	−7	26	Relegated To GNF 2
16	CODM Meknès	30	3	15	12	24	40	−16	24	Relegated To GNF 2

==== Matches ====
Date	Opponents	Venue	Result	Scorers	Report
22 September 2007	Olympique Khouribga	A	1–1	Abdellah Jlaidi 80'	Report
6 October 2007	JS El Massira	A	0–1		Report
16 October 2007	Moghreb Tétouan	H	1–1	Pape Ciré Dia 15'	Report
4 November 2007	IZ Khémisset	H	0–0		Report
10 November 2007	AS FAR	H	1–1	Hassan Tair 24'	Report
24 November 2007	Wydad AC	H	2–0	Abdellah Jlaidi 41' Abdessamad Ouhakki 45'	Report
2 December 2007	Kénitra AC	A	0–1		Report
5 December 2007	Olympique Safi	A	1–0	Abdellah Jlaidi 56'	Report
9 December 2007	Hassania Agadir	H	1–0	Hicham El Amrani 73' (pen.)	Report
19 December 2007	Maghreb AS	A	2–1	Abdelali Essamlali 6' Abdellah Jlaidi 30'	Report
30 December 2007	Difaâ El Jadidi	H	1–0	Abdessamad Ouhakki 11'	Report
5 January 2008	Kawkab Marrakech	A	0–1		Report
9 January 2008	Fath Union Sport	A	1–0	Abderrahim Chkilit 32'	Report
13 January 2008	COD Meknès	H	2–0	André Senghor 51', 85'	Report
20 January 2008	MC Oujda	A	1–1	André Senghor 44'	Report
27 January 2008	Olympique Khouribga	H	0–0		Report
3 February 2008	Moghreb Tétouan	A	0–0		Report
10 February 2008	JS El Massira	H	3–0	Abdellah Jlaidi 6' (pen.) Pape Ciré Dia 11', 56'	Report
16 February 2008	IZ Khémisset	A	1–2	André Senghor 40'	Report
24 February 2008	Olympique Safi	H	1–1	Omar Nejjary 76'	Report
16 March 2008	Maghreb AS	H	2–1	Abdellah Jlaidi 10' (pen.) Mourad Ainy 90'	Report
23 March 2008	Wydad AC	A	1–0	André Senghor 45'	Report
30 March 2008	Kénitra AC	H	2–2	Pape Ciré Dia 45+2' Abdellah Jlaidi 51'	Report
9 April 2008	AS FAR	A	0–0		Report
13 April 2008	Hassania Agadir	A	0–2		Report
18 April 2008	Fath Union Sport	H	1–0	Hassan Tair 32'	Report
27 April 2008	Difaâ El Jadidi	A	3–4	André Senghor 4', 19' Mohsine Moutouali 11'	Report
6 May 2008	Kawkab Marrakech	H	1–1	Pape Ciré Dia 55'	Report
4 June 2008	COD Meknès	A	0–0		Report
8 June 2008	MC Oujda	H	3–2	André Senghor 1' Mohsine Moutouali 65' Abdessamad Ouhakki 85'	Report

=== Throne Cup ===
Date	Round	Opponents	Venue	Result	Scorers	Report
1 March 2008	Round of 32	Olympique Safi	H	3–3 (4–2p)	Tahar Doghmi 45' Ciré Dia 61' Hicham El Amrani 118'	
5 April 2008	Round of 16	Kawkab Marrakech	H	2–1	Omar Nejjary 90' Mohsine Moutouali 100'	Report
10 May 2008	Quarter-finals	Moghreb Tétouan	A	0–1	-	Report

=== Arab Champions League ===
==== Round of 32 ====
(Morocco) Raja CA	w/o	Shabab Rafah (Palestine)

Raja CA advanced to the next round after the withdrawal of Palestinian club Shabab Rafah. UAFA stated that Israeli authorities refused to issue travel permits to the Palestinian delegation.

==== Round of 16 ====
25 October 2007	(Sudan) Al-Merrikh	2–2	(Morocco) Raja CA	Omdurman
	Paulinho 40' (pen.); Ammari 90'	Report	El Amrani 10'; Sbai 23'; Chakhsi (red card) 70'	Stadium: Al-Merrikh Stadium

17 November 2007	(Morocco) Raja CA	3–1	(Sudan) Al-Merrikh	Rabat
	Jlaidi 14'; El Amrani 80' (pen.); Ouhakki 90+1'	Report	Ajab 8'	Stadium: Moulay Abdellah Stadium; Attendance: 10000

==== Groupe stage ====
Team	Pld	W	D	L	GF	GA	GD	Pts
(Algeria) ES Sétif	6	3	2	1	10	4	+6	11
(Jordan) Al-Faisaly	6	2	3	1	9	7	+2	9
(Morocco) Raja CA	6	1	4	1	3	4	−1	7
(Syria) Al-Majd	6	0	3	3	5	12	−7	3

Source: RSSSF

28 November 2007	Raja CA (Morocco)	0–0	(Jordan) Al-Faisaly	Casablanca
		Report		Stadium: Stade Mohamed V Attendance: 30000; Referee: Asslem Jadidi (Tunisia)

12 December 2007	ES Sétif (Algeria)	2–0	(Morocco) Raja CA	Setif
	Maïza 31'; Touil 88'	Report		Stadium: Stade 8 Mai 1945; Referee: Talaat Najm (Lebanon)

25 December 2007	Al-Majd (Syria)	1–1	(Morocco) Raja CA	Damascus
	Al Zeno 28'	Report	Aïni 93'	Stadium: Abbasiyyin Stadium

20 February 2008	Raja CA (Morocco)	1–0	(Algeria) ES Sétif	Casablanca
	Senghor 60'	Report		Stadium: Stade Mohamed V Attendance: 40000

5 March 2008	Raja CA (Morocco)	0–0	(Syria) Al-Majd	Casablanca
		Report		Stadium: Stade Mohamed V Attendance: 40000

12 March 2008	Al-Faisaly (Jordan)	1–1	(Morocco) Raja CA	Amman
	Abdul-Amir 25'	Report	Ciré Dia 13'	Stadium: Amman International Stadium

== Squad information ==
=== Goals ===
Includes all competitive matches. The list is sorted alphabetically by surname when total goals are equal.

Rank	Pos.	Player	Botola	Throne Cup	Arab Champions League	Total
1	FW	(Senegal) André Senghor	8	0	1	9
2	MF	(Morocco) Abdellah Jlaidi	7	0	1	8
3	FW	(Senegal) Pape Ciré Dia	5	1	1	7
4	DF	(Morocco) Hicham El Amrani	1	1	2	4
5	MF	(Morocco) Abdessamad Ouhaki	3	0	1	4
6	FW	(Morocco) Mohsine Moutouali	2	1	0	3
7	FW	(Morocco) Hassan Tair	2	0	0	2
8	MF	(Morocco) Omar Nejjary	1	1	0	2
9	DF	(Morocco) Mourad Ainy	1	0	1	2
10	DF	(Morocco) Abderrahim Chkilit	1	0	0	1
11	MF	(Morocco) Abdelali Essamlali	1	0	0	1
12	MF	(Morocco) Tahar Doghmi	0	1	0	1
13	DF	(Morocco) Khalid Sbai	0	0	1	1
Own goals			0	0	0	0
Total			32	5	8	45
