= 2008–09 Raja CA season =

Raja CA
2008–09 season
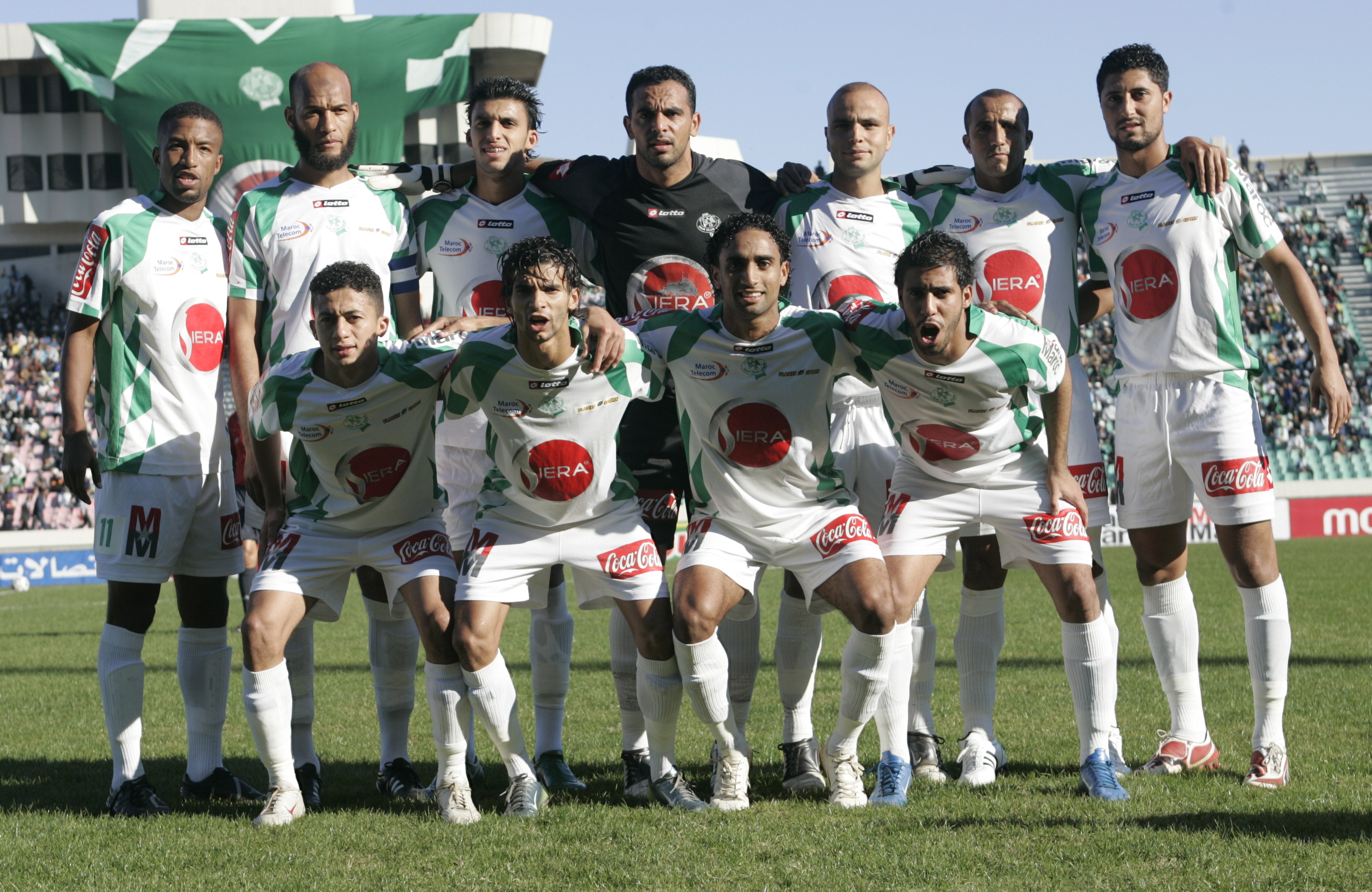
- Raja players against Maghreb AS during a Botola game
- President: Abdellah Rhallam
- Manager: José Romão
- Stadium: Stade Mohamed V
- Botola: 1st
- Moroccan Throne Cup: Round of 32
- Arab Champions league: Round of 16
- Top goalscorer: League: Mohsine Moutouali (8); All: Mohsine Moutouali (10)
- Biggest win: 5–0 v JS Massira (Home, 19 October 2008, Botola)

The 2008–09 season is Raja Club Athletic's 60th season in existence and the club's 53th consecutive season in the top flight of Moroccan football. In addition to the domestic league, they are also participating in this season's editions of the Throne Cup and the Arab Champions league. This is the first season since 2000–01 without Amin Erbate who joined Olympique Marseille on 2 July 2008.

Raja CA kicked off the season with a 0–0 home draw against Olympique Safi in the first round of Botola.

== Squad ==
Note: Flags indicate national team as defined under FIFA eligibility rules; some limited exceptions apply. Players may hold more than one non-FIFA nationality.

No.	Pos.	Nation	Player
1	GK	MAR	Mohammed Amine El Bourkadi
3	DF	MAR	Zakaria Zerouali
4	DF	MAR	Samir Zekroumi
4	DF	MAR	Mourad Ainy
5	FW	MAR	Mohsine Moutouali
6	DF	MAR	Yassine Remch
7	FW	MAR	Youssef Agnaou
8	DF	MAR	Abdellatif Jrindou (captain)
10	MF	MAR	Abdessamad Ouhakki
11	MF	MAR	Nabil Mesloub
12	GK	MAR	Youness Ataba
13	MF	MAR	Omar Nejjary
14	DF	MAR	Mehdi Azouar
15	DF	MAR	Hicham El Amrani
16	MF	MAR	Mohammed Oulhaj
17	MF	MAR	Rachid Soulaimani

No.	Pos.	Nation	Player
18	FW	SEN	Pape Ciré Dia
20	MF	MAR	Hassan Daoudi
21	MF	MAR	Moulay Abdellah Jlaidi
22	GK	MAR	Yassine El Had
23	FW	MAR	Omar Najdi
24	DF	MAR	Sami Tajeddine
25	FW	MAR	Hassan Tair
26	MF	MAR	Said Fettah
27	DF	MAR	Ismail Belmaalem
27	MF	NED	Khalid Hamdaoui
28	FW	MAR	Mohamed Armoumen
29	FW	MAR	Abdelali Semlali
29	FW	SEN	Ibrahima Ndione
30	FW	SEN	Djim Ngom
—	FW	MAR	Zakaria Jaouhari

=== Youth squad ===
Note: Flags indicate national team as defined under FIFA eligibility rules; some limited exceptions apply. Players may hold more than one non-FIFA nationality.

No.	Pos.	Nation	Player
—	GK	MAR	Yahia Filali
—	GK	MAR	Abdelali Adnaoui
—	GK	MAR	Ayoub Takeddine
—	DF	MAR	Anas Sabyh
—	DF	MAR	Abdessamad Akhaoui
—	DF	MAR	Yassine Tahoune
—	DF	MAR	Hicham Ait Lkraf
—	DF	MAR	Hamza Madani
—	DF	MAR	Mohammed Ait Hammou
—	DF	MAR	Zakaria Lachgare
—	DF	MAR	Ayoub Akird
—	MF	MAR	Jalal Ayadi
—	MF	MAR	Taoufik Dahbi
—	MF	MAR	Mehdi Zakani

No.	Pos.	Nation	Player
—	MF	MAR	Zouhir Ait Badda
—	MF	MAR	Anas Haddaoui
—	MF	MLI	Souleymane Bamba
—	MF	MAR	Soufiane Talal
—	MF	MAR	Rabii Aboutalbi
—	MF	CIV	Charles Kouaddio
—	FW	MAR	Soufiane Manfanlouti
—	FW	MAR	Mohammed Belaamane
—	FW	MAR	Abdelhak Ahiare
—	FW	MAR	Youssef Mahrous
—	FW	MAR	Abdelkader Drihem
—	FW	MAR	Ayoub Fadel
—	FW	MAR	Abdeslam Moutaabad

== Pre-season ==
Raja CA entered the preseason with a mix of satisfaction and renewed ambition after finishing third the previous season, a strong recovery from having narrowly avoided relegation the season before. Club president Abdellah Rhallam stated that the club have a positive financial balance thanks to sponsorships and player sales. He announced a structured preparation program that included medical tests in mid-July, a short training phase in Casablanca, and a 13-day intensive camp in Ifrane followed by friendly matches.

Another camp was held in Agadir, where the technical staff emphasized a youth-focused policy and the coach openly set ambitious goals of winning at least one title in the upcoming season. The squad was reinforced with new signings, while the management dealt with ongoing administrative issues such as the Mouhcine Iajour contract dispute. Overall, the preseason reflected a stabilized club, financially cautious, and eager to return to competing for major.

=== Friendly games ===
Date	Opponents	Venue	Result	Scorers
06 August 2008	USKM Inezgane	Inezgane	5–0	
08 August 2008	Chabab Houara	Oulad Teima	3–1	
23 August 2008	Chabab Mohammédia	Mohammédia	1–0	Abdessamad Ouhaki 30'
15 February 2009	Kawkab Marrakesh	Casablanca	2–2	Omar Najdi 20' Ciré Dia 50'

=== Ntifi tournament ===
Date	Round	Opponents	Venue	Result	Scorers	Report
28 August 2008	Match 1	Olympique Khouribga	Père-Jégo Stadium, Casablanca	1–1 (4–5p)	Mohsine Moutouali 90'	Report
30 August 2008	Match 2	Kawkab Marrakesh	Père-Jégo Stadium, Casablanca	1–1		Report
31 August 2008	Third place	Maghreb AS	Père-Jégo Stadium, Casablanca	0–0 (0–3p)		Report

== Competitions ==
=== Overview ===
Competition	First match	Last match	Starting round	Final position	Record							
Competition	First match	Last match	Starting round	Final position	Pld	W	D	L	GF	GA	GD	Win %
Botola	13 September 2008	14 June 2009	Matchday 1	Winners	30	17	10	3	44	17	+27	56.67
Throne Cup	5 April 2009	5 April 2009	Round of 32	Round of 32	1	0	0	1	1	2	−1	0.00
Arab Champions League	29 October 2008	28 December 2008	Round of 32	Round of 16	4	1	2	1	6	3	+3	25.00
Total					35	18	12	5	51	22	+29	51.43

Last updated: 14 June 2009
Source: Lematin

=== Botola ===
==== League table ====
Pos	Team	Pld	W	D	L	GF	GA	GD	Pts	Qualification or relegation
1	Raja CA	30	17	10	3	44	17	+27	61	2010 CAF Champions League
2	Difaa El Jadida	30	16	6	8	32	20	+12	54	2010 CAF Champions League
3	FAR Rabat	30	14	11	5	39	17	+22	53	2010 CAF Confederation Cup (Note: FUS Rabat also qualified for the 2010 CAF Confederation Cup as the 2009 Coupe du Trône runner-up.)
4	Wydad Casablanca	30	13	11	6	26	17	+9	50	
5	OC Khouribga	30	12	10	8	26	25	+1	46	
6	Moghreb Tétouan	30	11	8	11	29	28	+1	41	
7	AS Sale	30	10	10	10	27	29	−2	40	
8	Maghreb Fez	30	10	10	10	28	27	+1	40	
9	Hassania Agadir	30	10	8	12	30	30	0	38	
10	Kawkab Marrakech	30	7	15	8	28	31	−3	36	
11	Olympique Safi	30	6	16	8	25	28	−3	34	
12	Jeunesse Massira	30	8	10	12	31	41	−10	34	
13	Ittihad Khemisset	30	7	12	11	22	29	−7	33	
14	KAC Kenitra	30	8	7	15	24	34	−10	31	
15	Mouloudia Oujda	30	7	7	16	21	37	−16	28	Relegated to GNF 2
16	Chabab Mohammédia	30	4	9	17	16	38	−22	21	Relegated to GNF 2

Source: goalzz.com

==== Matches ====
Date	Opponents	Venue	Result	Scorers	Report
13 September 2008	Olympique Safi	H	0–0		Report
21 September 2008	AS FAR	A	1–4	Jrindou 52'	Report
26 September 2008	Moghreb Tétouan	H	1–1	Jlaidi 81'	Report
4 October 2008	AS Salé	A	0–1		Report
12 October 2008	Kénitra AC	A	3–1	Tair 49' Najdi 56' Moutouali 79'	Report
19 October 2008	JS El Massira	H	5–0	Mesloub 17' Nejjary 44' Moutouali 60' Tair 64' Oulhaj 81'	Report
25 October 2008	IZ Khémisset	A	1–0	Nejjary 17'	Report
2 November 2008	MC Oujda	H	1–0	Moutouali 62' (pen.)	Report
5 November 2008	Difaâ El Jadidi	A	2–1	Moutouali 12' (pen.) Jlaidi 32' (pen.)	Report
9 November 2008	Maghreb AS	H	1–1	Fettah 46'	Report
16 November 2008	Wydad AC	A	0–0		Report
7 December 2008	Kawkab Marrakech	A	1–1	Tair 90+3'	Report
21 December 2008	Chabab Mohammédia	H	4–0	Tajeddine 8' Tair 15', 78' Najdi 60' (pen.)	Report
31 December 2008	Olympique Khouribga	H	2–0	Najdi 43' Jlaidi 55'	Report
4 January 2009	Hassania Agadir	A	1–0	Tair 50'	Report
11 January 2009	Olympique Safi	A	1–0	Ngom 45'	Report
18 January 2009	AS FAR	H	3–1	Zerouali 33' Jrindou 51' Moutouali 90' (pen.)	Report
25 January 2009	Moghreb Tétouan	A	1–1	Armoumen 48'	Report
8 February 2009	AS Salé	H	4–0	Najdi 30' Nejjary 38' Moutouali 65' Armoumen 83'	Report
21 February 2009	Kénitra AC	H	0–0		Report
28 February 2009	JS El Massira	A	1–1	Moutouali 6' (pen.)	Report
6 March 2009	IZ Khémisset	H	1–0	Armoumen 45'	Report
22 March 2009	MC Oujda	A	0–0		Report
29 March 2009	Difaâ El Jadidi	H	1–0	Ouhaki 59'	Report
11 April 2009	Maghreb AS	A	1–0	Armoumen 49'	Report
3 May 2009	Wydad AC	H	0–1		Report
16 May 2009	Olympique Khouribga	A	1–1	Fettah 57'	Report
24 May 2009	Kawkab Marrakech	H	4–1	Ciré Dia 4' Armoumen 15' Najdi 67' Ngom 90'	Report
30 May 2009	Chabab Mohammédia	A	1–0	Najdi 42'	Report
14 June 2009	Hassania Agadir	H	2–1	Moutouali 1' Ngom 71'	Report

=== Throne Cup ===
Date	Opponents	Venue	Result	Scorers	Report
5 April 2009	Union Aït Melloul	H	1–2	Mohsine Moutouali 45'	Report

=== Arab Champions League ===
==== Round of 32 ====
29 October 2008	(Morocco) Raja CA	4–0	(Syria) Al-Taliya	Casablanca
17:00 GMT	Tair 20' 63'; Moutouali 45' (pen.); Najdi 68' (pen.)	Report		Stadium: Stade Mohamed V Attendance: 40000

24 November 2008	(Syria) Al-Taliya	2–2	(Morocco) Raja CA	Aleppo
18:00 GMT		Report	Jlaidi 3'; Tair 31'	Stadium: Al-Hamadaniah Stadium; Attendance: 15000

==== Round of 16 ====
17 December 2008	(Tunisia) CS Sfaxien	0–0	(Morocco) Raja CA	Sfax
18:00 GMT		Report		Stadium: Stade Taïeb Mhiri; Attendance: 15000; Referee: (Lebanon) Talaat Najm

28 December 2008	(Morocco) Raja CA	0–1	(Tunisia) CS Sfaxien	Casablanca
17:00 GMT		Report	Younés 45'	Stadium: Stade Mohamed V Attendance: 35000; Referee: (Algeria) Djamel Haimoudi

== Squad information ==
=== Goals ===
Includes all competitive matches. The list is sorted alphabetically by surname when total goals are equal.

Rank	Pos.	Player	Botola	Throne Cup	Arab Champions League	Total
1	FW	(Morocco) Mohsine Moutouali	8	1	1	10
2	FW	(Morocco) Hassan Tair	6	0	3	9
3	FW	(Morocco) Omar Najdi	6	0	1	7
4	FW	(Morocco) Mohamed Armoumen	5	0	0	5
5	MF	(Morocco) Abdellah Jlaidi	3	0	1	4
6	FW	(Morocco) Omar Nejjary	3	0	0	3
7	FW	(Senegal) Djim Ngom	3	0	0	3
8	MF	(Morocco) Said Fettah	2	0	0	2
9	FW	(Morocco) Abdellatif Jrindou	2	0	0	2
10	FW	(Senegal) Pape Ciré Dia	1	0	0	1
11	MF	(Morocco) Nabil Mesloub	1	0	0	1
12	DF	(Morocco) Zakaria Zerouali	1	0	0	1
13	FW	(Morocco) Abdessamad Ouhaki	1	0	0	1
14	DF	(Morocco) Sami Tajeddine	1	0	0	1
15	DF	(Morocco) Mohamed Oulhaj	1	0	0	1
Own goals			0	0	0	0
Total			44	1	6	51

=== Assists ===
Rank	Pos.	Player	Botola	Throne Cup	Arab Champions League	Total
1	FW	(Morocco) Mohsine Moutouali	5	0	0	5
2	FW	(Morocco) Omar Nejjary	5	0	2	5
3	FW	(Senegal) Pape Ciré Dia	3	0	0	5
4	FW	(Morocco) Omar Najdi	3	0	0	3
5	MF	(Morocco) Abdellah Jlaidi	2	0	0	2
6	FW	(Morocco) Hassan Tair	1	0	0	1
7	FW	(Morocco) Mohamed Armoumen	1	0	0	1
8	FW	(Senegal) Ibrahima Ndione	1	0	0	1
9	MF	(Morocco) Hassan Daoudi	1	0	0	1
10	FW	(Morocco) Abdellatif Jrindou	1	0	0	1
11	DF	(Morocco) Sami Tajeddine	1	0	0	1
12	FW	(Morocco) Abdessamad Ouhaki	0	1	0	1
Total			24	1	2	27
