= 2009–10 Raja CA season =

Raja CA
2009–10 season
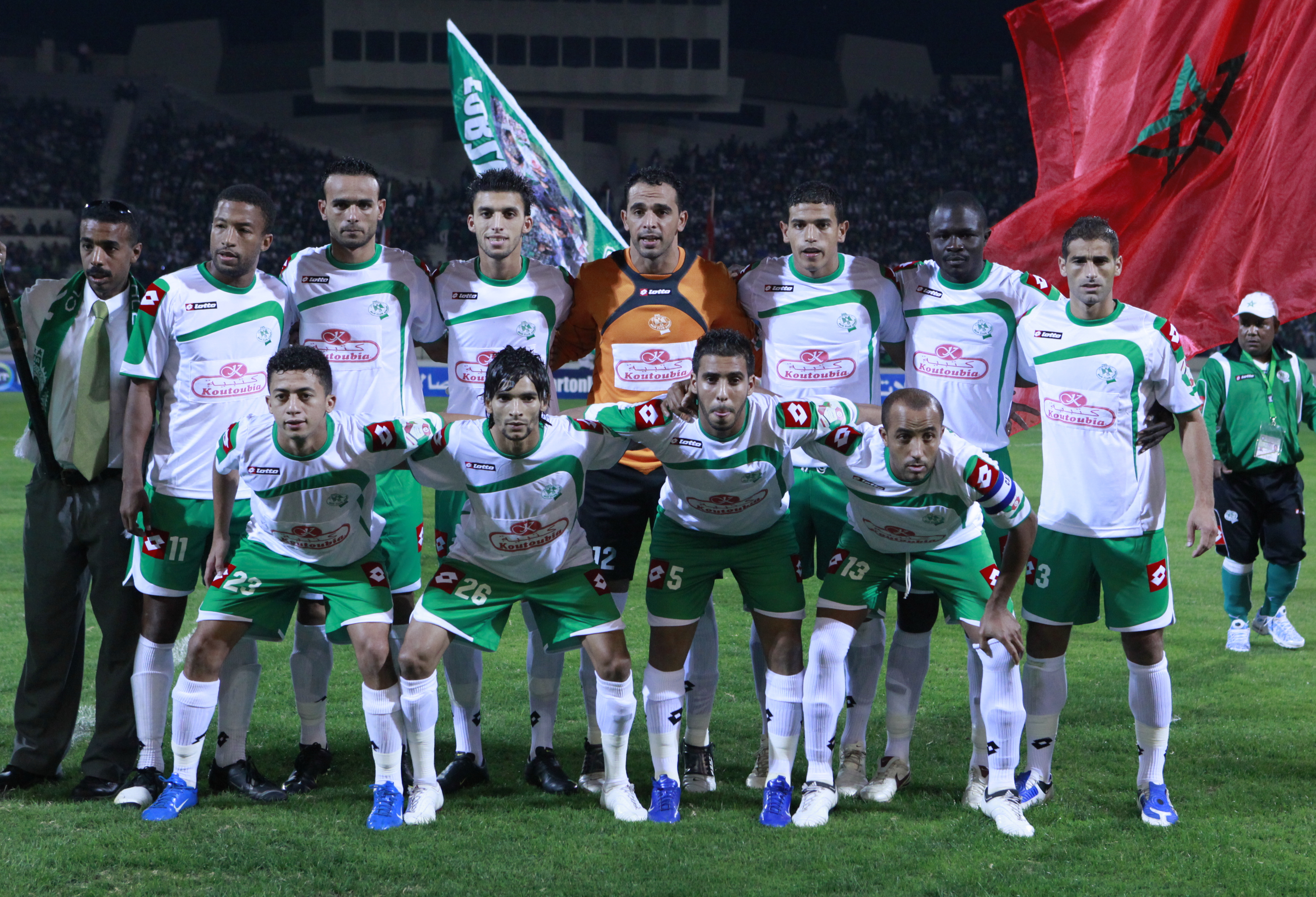
- Raja players against ES Setif during a North African Cup of Champions game
- President: Abdesslam Hanat
- Manager: Carlos Mozer (until 19 October); José Romão
- Stadium: Stade Mohamed V
- Botola: 2nd
- Champions League: Group stage
- North African Cup of Champions: Semi-final
- Top goalscorer: League: Omar Najdi (11); All: Omar Najdi (13)
- Biggest win: 0–3 v Kenitra AC (Away, 7 February 2010, Botola)

The 2009–10 season is Raja Club Athletic's 61st season in existence and the club's 53rd consecutive season in the top flight of Moroccan football. In addition to the domestic league, they are also participating in this season's editions of the CAF Champions League and North African Cup of Champions.

Raja CA kicked off the season with a 0–1 home win against AS FAR in the first round of Botola.

== Squad ==
Note: Flags indicate national team as defined under FIFA eligibility rules; some limited exceptions apply. Players may hold more than one non-FIFA nationality.

No.	Pos.	Nation	Player
1	GK	MAR	Yassine El Had
2	DF	MAR	Youness Bellakhder
3	DF	MAR	Zakaria Zerouali
4	DF	MAR	Mourad Ainy
5	FW	MAR	Mohsine Moutouali
6	DF	MAR	Samir Zakroumi
7	DF	MAR	Soufiane Alloudi
8	DF	MAR	Abdellatif Jrindou (captain)
10	MF	MAR	Abdessamad Ouhakki
11	MF	MAR	Nabil Mesloub
12	GK	MAR	Youness Ataba
13	MF	MAR	Omar Nejjary
14	FW	MAR	Youssef Agnaou
15	MF	MAR	Redouane Baqlal
16	MF	MAR	Mohamed Oulhaj
17	MF	MAR	Rachid Soulaimani

No.	Pos.	Nation	Player
18	FW	SEN	Pape Ciré Dia
19	GK	MAR	Tarik El Jarmouni
20	FW	MAR	Tarik Tnibar
21	MF	MAR	Moulay Abdellah Jlaidi
23	FW	MAR	Omar Najdi
24	MF	MLI	Souleymane Demba
25	MF	MAR	Yassine Salhi
26	MF	MAR	Said Fettah
27	DF	MAR	Ismail Belmaalem
28	MF	CIV	Kouko Guehi
29	MF	MAR	Soufiane Talal
30	MF	SEN	Mamadou Baila
31	FW	SEN	Djim Ngom
—	DF	MAR	Abdelouahed Chakhsi
—	MF	MAR	Zakaria Aboub
—	MF	MAR	Taoufik Dahbi

== Pre-season ==
=== Friendly games ===
Date	Opponents	Venue	Result	Scorers
26 July 2009	USKM Inezgane	Inezgane	7–0	Abdellah Jlaidi 76' Mourad Aarab Yassine Salhi Hajji Ibrahim
8 August 2009	Chabab Houara	Oulad Teima	1–0	Omar Najdi
18 August 2009	Chabab Mohammédia	Mohammédia	3–0	
19 September 2009	Fath Union Sport	Casablanca	0–0	

=== Ntifi tournament ===
Date	Round	Opponents	Venue	Result	Scorers	Report
13 August 2009	Match 1	Difaâ El Jadidi	Père-Jégo Stadium, Casablanca	1–0	Mourad Ainy	Report
15 August 2009	Match 2	Racing AC	Père-Jégo Stadium, Casablanca	1–1 (4–3p)	Djim Ngom 23'	Report
16 August 2009	Final	AS FAR	Stade Mohammed-V, Casablanca	3–0	Abdessamad Ouhaki 2' Yassine Salhi 47' Omar Nejjary 79'	Report

== Competitions ==
=== Overview ===
Competition	First match	Last match	Starting round	Final position	Record							
Competition	First match	Last match	Starting round	Final position	Pld	W	D	L	GF	GA	GD	Win %
Botola	30 August 2009	15 May 2010	Matchday 1	Runners-up	30	14	10	6	39	26	+13	46.67
Champions League	14 February 2010	4 April 2010	Preliminary round	First round	3	1	1	1	5	4	+1	33.33
North African Cup of Champions	27 October 2009	24 November 2009	Semi-final	Semi-final	2	0	1	1	1	3	−2	0.00
Total					35	15	12	8	45	33	+12	42.86

Last updated: 15 May 2010
Source: Sofascore

=== Botola ===
==== League table ====
Pos	Team	Pld	W	D	L	GF	GA	GD	Pts	Qualification or relegation
1	Wydad Casablanca (C)	30	15	9	6	36	22	+14	54	Qualification for 2011 CAF Champions League
2	Raja CA	30	14	10	6	39	26	+13	52	Qualification for 2011 CAF Champions League
3	Difaa El Jadida	30	12	14	4	30	17	+13	50	Qualification for 2011 CAF Confederation Cup
4	Kawkab Marrakech	30	10	14	6	27	19	+8	44	
5	Olympique Khouribga	30	11	10	9	30	26	+4	43	

Updated to match(es) played on 10 June 2010. Source: Soccerway.com
Rules for classification: 1) points; 2) goal difference; 3) number of goals scored.
(C) Champions

==== Matches ====
Date	Opponents	Venue	Result	Scorers	Report
30 August 2009	AS FAR	H	1–0	Djim Ngom 52'	Report
12 September 2009	Hassania Agadir	A	0–0		Report
27 September 2009	Kénitra AC	H	2–0	Mohsine Moutouali 40' Omar Najdi 45' (pen.)	Report
4 October 2009	Wydad Fes	A	1–1	Omar Nejjary 31'	Report
17 October 2009	AS Salé	A	1–1	Omar Najdi 5'	Report
23 October 2009	Moghreb Tétouan	H	1–1	Pape Ciré Dia 84'	Report
1 November 2009	Kawkab Marrakech	A	1–2	Omar Najdi 32' Yassine Salhi 76'	Report
7 November 2009	Difaâ El Jadidi	H	1–1	Djim Ngom 22'	Report
2 December 2009	Fath Union Sport	A	0–1		Report
6 December 2009	JS El Massira	H	3–2	Omar Najdi 4' 62' Omar Nejjary 97' (pen.)	Report
12 December 2009	Maghreb AS	A	0–1		Report
20 December 2009	Wydad AC	H	1–1	Omar Najdi 87'	Report
27 December 2009	IZ Khémisset	A	1–0	Omar Najdi 36'	Report
1 January 2010	Olympique Khouribga	H	2–2	Mohsine Moutouali 68' (pen.) Yassine Salhi 86'	Report
10 January 2010	Olympique Safi	A	2–0	Soufiane Alloudi 30' Omar Najdi 83'	Report
31 January 2010	Hassania Agadir	H	2–1	Mohsine Moutouali 15' (pen.) 58'	Report
7 February 2010	Kénitra AC	A	3–0	Yassine Salhi 20' 41' Mohsine Moutouali 66'	Report
19 February 2010	AS Salé	H	1–1	Yassine Salhi 4'	Report
24 February 2010	Wydad Fes	H	1–0	Omar Nejjary 78'	Report
4 March 2010	Moghreb Tétouan	A	0–0		Report
9 March 2010	Kawkab Marrakech	H	1–2	Mamadou Baila 46'	Report
14 March 2010	Difaâ El Jadidi	A	2–1	Omar Najdi 75' Youssef Agnaou 90'	Report
28 March 2010	Fath Union Sport	H	3–2	Omar Najdi 11' Yassine Salhi 32' 79'	Report
9 April 2010	JS El Massira	A	0–1		Report
13 April 2010	Maghreb AS	H	2–0	Yassine Salhi 41' 77'	Report
18 April 2010	Wydad AC	A	1–0	Mamadou Baila 41'	Report
25 April 2010	IZ Khémisset	H	1–1	Omar Najdi 45'	Report
2 May 2010	Olympique Khouribga	A	1–2	Mohsine Moutouali 11'	Report
8 May 2010	Olympique Safi	H	3–2	Mohsine Moutouali 55' (pen.) Mamadou Baila 57' Yassine Salhi 70'	Report
15 May 2010	AS FAR	A	0–1		Report

=== CAF Champions League ===
==== Preliminary round ====
14 February 2010	Fello Star (Guinea)	1–3	(Morocco) Raja CA	Stade du 28 Septembre, Conakry
16:30 UTC±0	Alpha Oumar Diallo 89'	Report	Omar Najdi 11'; Pape Ciré Dia 72'; Mohamed Traore 76' (o.g.)	Referee: E. Billy Parkinson (Sierra Leone)

28 February 2010	Raja CA (Morocco)	1–1	(Guinea) Fello Star	Stade Mohamed V, Casablanca
17:00 UTC±0	Omar Najdi 16'	Report	Abass Cisse 90'	Referee: Slim Jedidi (Tunisia)

==== First round ====
21 March 2010	Raja CA (Morocco)	1–1	(Angola) Petro de Luanda	Stade Mohamed V, Casablanca
17:00 UTC±0	Mohsine Moutouali 48' (pen.)		Avex 43'	Referee: Mohamed Benouza (Algeria)

4 April 2010	Petro de Luanda (Angola)	1–0	(Morocco) Raja CA	Estádio 11 de Novembro, Luanda
16:00 UTC+1	Joka 65'			Referee: Kalyoto Robert Ngosi (Malawi)

=== North African Cup of Champions ===
27 October 2009	Raja CA (Morocco)	1 – 1	(Algeria) ES Sétif	Stade Mohamed V, Casablanca
19:15 EET	Pape Ciré Dia 81'; Nabil Mesloub (yellow card) 44' (yellow-red card) 84'; Omar Najdi (yellow card) 90+4'	Report (in Arabic)	Nabil Hemani (yellow card) 34'; Abdelmalek Ziaya 69'	Referee: (Libya) Adil Arra'ee

24 November 2009	ES Sétif (Algeria)	2 – 0	(Morocco) Raja CA	Stade 8 Mai 1945, Sétif
17:00 GMT	Abdelmalek Ziaya 32', 49'		Ismail Belmaalem (yellow card) 36'	Referee: (Tunisia) Aouaz Trabelsi

== Squad information ==
=== Goals ===
Includes all competitive matches. The list is sorted alphabetically by surname when total goals are equal.

Rank	Pos.	Player	Botola	Champions league	North African Cup of Champions	Total
1	FW	(Morocco) Omar Najdi	11	2	0	13
2	FW	(Morocco) Yassine Salhi	10	0	0	10
3	FW	(Morocco) Mohsine Moutouali	7	1	0	8
4	FW	(Morocco) Omar Nejjary	3	0	0	3
5	MF	(Senegal) Mamadou Baila Traoré	3	0	0	3
6	FW	(Senegal) Pape Ciré Dia	1	1	1	3
7	MF	(Senegal) Djim Ngom	2	0	0	2
8	MF	(Morocco) Youssef Agnaou	1	0	0	1
9	FW	(Morocco) Soufiane Alloudi	1	0	0	1
Own goals			0	1	0	1
Total			39	5	1	45
