= 2010–11 GNF 2 =

Botola 2
- Season: 2010–11

The 2010–11 GNF2 is the 49th season of Botola 2, the second division of the Moroccan football league. The season commenced on the 25 August 2010 and concluded on the 30 May 2011.

== Team movement ==
=== Teams relegated from 2009–10 Botola ===
- IZK Khemisset
- Association Salé

=== Teams promoted to 2010–11 Botola ===
- JSK Chabab Kasba Tadla
- Chabab Rif Hoceima

=== Teams relegated to 2010–11 GNFA 1 ===
- Chabab Atlas Khénifra
- Renaissance de Settat
- USK Sidi Kacem

=== Teams promoted from 2009–10 GNFA 1 ===
- Union Sportive Aït Melloul
- Hilal Nador

== Competing clubs ==
Team	Stadium	Previous Season
IZK Khemisset		Relegated from 2009–10 Botola
Association Salé		Relegated from 2009–10 Botola
Union de Mohammédia		3rd in 2009–10 GNF 2
CODM de Meknès		4th in 2009–10 GNF 2
US Témara		5th in 2009–10 GNF 2
Chabab Houara		6th in 2009–10 GNF 2
Stade Moracain Rabat		7th in 2009–10 GNF 2
Racing Cascablanca		8th in 2009–10 GNF 2
Raja Al Hoceima		9th in 2009–10 GNF 2
Youssoufia Berrechid		10th in 2009–10 GNF 2
Mouloudia d'Oujda		11th in 2009–10 GNF 2
TAS Casablanca		12th in 2009–10 GNF 2
Ittihad Tanger		13th in 2009–10 GNF 2
Rachad Bernoussi Cascablanca		14th in 2009–10 GNF 2
Ittihad Riadi Fkih Ben Salah		15th in 2009–10 GNF 2
Chabab Mohammédia		16th in 2009–10 GNF 2
Union Sportive Aït Melloul		Promoted from 2009–10 GNFA 1
Hilal Nador		Promoted from 2009–10 GNFA 1

== Table ==
Pos	Team	Pld	W	D	L	GF	GA	GD	Pts	Promotion or relegation
1	CODM de Meknès	34	16	16	2	35	10	+25	64	Promotion to 2011–12 Botola
2	IZK Khemisset	34	17	10	7	43	29	+14	61	Promotion to 2011–12 Botola
3	Union Sportive Aït Melloul	34	16	13	5	42	24	+18	61	
4	Youssoufia Berrechid	34	15	14	5	33	20	+13	59	
5	TAS Casablanca	34	13	11	10	26	25	+1	50	
6	Mouloudia d'Oujda	34	12	11	11	29	29	0	47	
7	Union de Mohammédia	34	12	10	12	28	28	0	46	
8	Chabab Houara	34	11	13	10	28	29	−1	46	
9	Rachad Bernoussi Casablanca	34	10	13	11	27	29	−2	43	
10	Racing Casablanca	34	10	12	12	38	36	+2	42	
11	Ittihad Tanger	34	9	13	12	28	33	−5	40	
12	Association Salé	34	10	9	15	38	39	−1	39	
13	US Témara	34	7	18	9	25	26	−1	39	
14	Stade Marocain Rabat	34	8	15	11	18	24	−6	39	
15	Raja Al Hoceima	34	8	11	15	18	29	−11	35	
16	Ittihad Riadi Fkih Ben Salah	34	9	8	17	27	39	−12	35	
17	Chabab Mohammédia	34	6	15	13	25	33	−8	33	Relegation to 2011–12 GNFA 1
18	Hilal Nador	34	3	16	15	18	44	−26	25	Relegation to 2011–12 GNFA 1

Updated to match(es) played on 22 May 2011. Source: Soccerway.com
Rules for classification: 1) points; 2) goal difference; 3) number of goals scored.

== See also ==
- 2010–11 Botola
