= 2009 Arab Champions League final =

- Event: 2008–09 Arab Champions League
Wydad Casablanca	Espérance
(Morocco)	(Tunisia)
1	2

First leg
Wydad Casablanca	Espérance
0	1
- Date: 9 May 2009
- Venue: Stade Mohamed V, Casablanca
- Referee: (Syria) Muhsen Basma

Second leg
Espérance	Wydad Casablanca
1	1
- Date: 21 May 2009
- Venue: Stade 7 November, Radès
- Referee: (United Arab Emirates) Ali Hamad

The 2009 Arab Champions League final was a football match which was played on Saturday, 21 May 2009. It was the 6th final of the Arab Champions League. the final play as home and away matches, and it was contested between Espérance of Tunisia and Wydad Casablanca of Morocco.

== Match details ==
The 2009 Arab Champions League Final will be play home and away matches on 9 May at Stade Mohamed V, Casablanca, Morocco, on 21 May at Stade 7 November, Radès, Tunisia.

Team 1	Agg.	Team 2	1st leg	2nd leg
Wydad Casablanca (Morocco)	1–2	(Tunisia) Espérance Sportive de Tunis	0–1	1-1

=== First leg ===
May 9, 2009
17:00 GMT

Wydad Casablanca (Morocco)	0–1	(Tunisia) Espérance Sportive de Tunis
Younes Menkari (yellow card) 45+2'	Report (in Arabic)	Mickael Eneramo 30'; Khaled Korbi (yellow card) 58'; Wajdi Bouazzi (yellow card) 90+2'

Stade Mohamed V, Casablanca
Referee: (Syria) Muhsen Basma

Wydad Casablanca	Espérance Sportive de Tunis

=== Second leg ===
May 21, 2009

Espérance Sportive de Tunis (Tunisia)	1–1	(Morocco) Wydad Casablanca
Oussama Darragi 89' (pen.)		Rafik Abdessamad 66' (pen.); Mustapha Bidoudane (red card) 75'; Fouzi El Brazi (red card) 90+4'

Stade 7 November, Rades
Referee: (United Arab Emirates) Ali Hamad Al-Badwawi

Espérance Sportive de Tunis	Wydad Casablanca
