= 2009–10 GNF 2 =

The GNF2 2009–10 was the 48th edition of the Botola 2. For this season, the competition was expanded to 19 teams as 3 teams instead of the usual two were promoted from the 2008–09 GNFA 1 season. The season commenced on 23 July 2008 and concluded on 31 May 2009. JSK Chabab Kasba Tadla were crowned as champions of the Botola 2 for the 2009–10 season resulting in two successive promotions for the club following the promotion to the Botola 2 in the previous season. Chabab Rif Hoceima were also promoted to the 2010–11 Botola after finishing runners-up.

== Team movement ==
=== Teams relegated from 2008–09 Botola ===
- Mouloudia d'Oujda
- Chabab Mohammédia

=== Teams promoted to 2009–10 Botola ===
- FUS Rabat
- Widad Fez

=== Teams relegated to 2009–10 GNFA 1 ===
- Olympique Marrakech
- CWW Cascablanca

=== Teams promoted from 2008–09 GNFA 1 ===
- JSK Chabab Kasba Tadla
- Raja Al Hoceima
- Chabab Atlas Khénifra

== Competing clubs ==
- Chabab Houara
- TAS Casablanca
- Chabab Rif Hoceima
- Raja Al Hoceima
- Racing Cascablanca
- Ittihad Tanger
- Youssoufia Berrechid
- Union de Mohammédia
- Chabab Mohammédia
- Stade Moracain Rabat
- Renaissance de Settat
- Mouloudia d'Oujda
- USK Sidi Kacem
- Rachad Bernoussi Cascablanca
- Ittihad Riadi Fkih Ben Salah
- US Témara
- CODM de Meknès
- JSK Chabab Kasba Tadla
- Chabab Atlas Khénifra

== Table ==
Pos	Team	Pld	W	D	L	GF	GA	GD	Pts	Promotion or relegation
1	JSK Chabab Kasba Tadla (C, P)	36	18	11	7	34	23	+11	65	Promotion to 2010–11 Botola
2	Chabab Rif Hoceima (P)	36	17	10	9	32	23	+9	61	Promotion to 2010–11 Botola
3	Union de Mohammédia	36	15	13	8	38	25	+13	58	
4	CODM Meknés	36	14	16	6	38	26	+12	58	
5	US Témara	36	14	14	8	39	35	+4	56	
6	Chabab Houara	36	13	14	9	38	28	+10	53	
7	Stade Moracain Rabat	36	13	13	10	36	33	+3	52	
8	Racing Cascablanca	36	14	10	12	36	36	0	52	
9	Raja Al Hoceima	36	12	12	12	37	36	+1	48	
10	Youssoufia Berrechid	36	11	10	15	39	35	+4	43	
11	Mouloudia d'Oujda	36	11	10	15	30	34	−4	43	
12	TAS Casablanca	36	9	15	12	28	28	0	42	
13	Ittihad Tanger	36	10	12	14	28	33	−5	42	
14	Rachad Bernoussi Cascablanca	36	11	9	16	26	37	−11	42	
15	Ittihad Riadi Fkih Ben Salah	36	10	11	15	29	36	−7	41	
16	Chabab Mohammédia	36	10	12	14	26	37	−11	42	
17	Chabab Atlas Khénifra (R)	36	11	7	18	31	46	−15	40	Relegation to 2011–12 GNFA 1
18	Renaissance de Settat (R)	36	7	17	12	29	40	−11	38	Relegation to 2011–12 GNFA 1
19	USK Sidi Kacem (R)	36	8	12	16	33	36	−3	36	Relegation to 2011–12 GNFA 1

Source: Soccerway.com
Rules for classification: 1) points; 2) goal difference; 3) number of goals scored.
(C) Champions; (P) Promoted; (R) Relegated

== See also ==
- 2009–10 Botola
