= Abdessamad Ouhakki =

Moroccan footballer (born 1988)

Adessamad Ouhakki
Personal information
- Full name: Adessamad Ouhakki
- Date of birth: 12 August 1988 (age 38)
- Place of birth: Casablanca, Morocco
- Height: 1.75 m (5 ft 9 in)
- Position: Attacking midfielder

Team information
- Current team: AS Salé

Youth career
- Raja Casablanca

Senior career*
Years	Team	Apps	(Gls)
2007–2012	Raja Casablanca	20	(5)
2012–2013	Ajman	5	(0)
2013	Al Urooba		
2013–2015	Al-Nahda		
2015	Al-Dhaid		
2016–	AS Salé		

International career
2008	Morocco U-23	1	(0)
- * Club domestic league appearances and goals

Abdessamad Ouhakki (Arabic: عبد الصمد أو حقي; born 12 August 1988) is a Moroccan footballer who plays for Al-Nahda Club in the Oman Professional League.

== Club career ==
Abdessamad began his professional career with Raja Casablanca in 2007. He helped the club to win the Arab Summer Cup in 2007, the Moroccan League in the 2008–09 season, the Antifi Cup in 2009 and helped them to reach the finals of the Antifi Cup in 2009. He again helped his club to reach the second position in the Moroccan League in the 2009–10 season and win the league in the 2010–11 season.

After spending a long five-seasons spell in Morocco with Raja Casablanca, he moved to the United Arab Emirates in 2012 where he signed a six-months contract with Ajman Club. He played in five matches and helped his team to win the 2013 Etisalat Emirates Cup. He made his UAE Pro League debut for Ajman Club on 5 October 2012 in a 2–1 loss against Al Jazira Club.

On 26 January 2014, he signed a six-month contract with Al-Nahda Club of Oman. He helped his team to reach the finals of the 2012 Sultan Qaboos Cup.

=== Club career statistics ===
Club	Season	Division	League		Cup		Continental		Other		Total	
Club	Season	Division	Apps	Goals	Apps	Goals	Apps	Goals	Apps	Goals	Apps	Goals
Raja Casablanca	2007–08	Botola	-	3	-	0	-	0	-	1	-	4
Raja Casablanca	2008–09	Botola	-	1	-	0	-	0	-	0	-	1
Raja Casablanca	2009–10	Botola	-	0	-	1	-	0	-	3	-	4
Raja Casablanca	2010–11	Botola	-	0	-	0	-	2	-	1	-	3
Raja Casablanca	2011–12	Botola	-	1	-	0	-	0	-	0	-	1
Raja Casablanca	Total		20	5	-	1	-	2	-	5	-	13
Ajman	2012–13	UAE Pro League	5	0	2	0	0	-	0	0	7	0
Ajman	Total		5	0	2	0	0	-	0	0	7	0
Al-Nahda	2013–14	Oman Professional League	-	1	-	1	-	0	0	1	-	3
Al-Nahda	Total		-	1	-	1	-	0	0	1	-	3
Career total			-	6	-	2	-	2	-	6	-	16

== Honours ==
=== Club ===
- With Raja Casablanca
  - Moroccan League (2): 2008–09, 2010–11; Runner-up 2009–10
  - Moroccan Cup (1): 2012
  - Arab Summer Cup (1): 2007
  - Antifi Cup (1): 2009; Runner-up 2010
- With Ajman
  - Etisalat Emirates Cup (1): 2013
- With Al-Nahda
  - Oman Professional League (1): 2013-14
  - Sultan Qaboos Cup (0): Runner-up 2012, 2013
