= André Senghor =

Senegalese footballer

Personal information
- Full name: André Senghor
- Date of birth: 28 January 1986 (age 40)
- Place of birth: Dakar, Senegal
- Height: 1.88 m (6 ft 2 in)
- Position: Striker

Senior career*
Years	Team	Apps	(Gls)
2005-2006	Diaraf	36	(14)
2006–2010	Al Ain	20	(8)
2008–2009	Al Ain B	3	(5)
2007–2008	→ Al-Karamah (loan)		(10)
2008	→ Raja Casablanca (loan)	17	(8)
2009–2013	Baniyas	83	(60)
2009–2010	Baniyas B	1	(2)
2013-2014	Al-Wasl	15	(5)
2015	Shenzhen Ruby	28	(10)
2016–2020	Nei Mongol Zhongyou	109	(61)
2021–2022	Cangzhou Mighty Lions	16	(2)

International career
2009–2012	Senegal	8	(1)
- * Club domestic league appearances and goals

André Koupouleni Senghor (born 28 January 1986) is a Senegalese retired footballer who played as a striker.

== Club career ==
Senghor was loaned to Raja Casablanca, where he scored two goals in his first league match, against CODM Meknès, the second was one of the best of season.

Senghor also played an important role in Al-Karamah's run in the 2007 AFC Champions League, while he was with the club on loan during 2007.

== International career ==
On 28 March 2009, he made his debut for the Senegal national football team against Oman.

== Career statistics ==
As of 26 December 2024

Appearances and goals by club, season and competition
Club	Season	League			National Cup		League Cup		Continental		Total	
Club	Season	Division	Apps	Goals	Apps	Goals	Apps	Goals	Apps	Goals	Apps	Goals
Diaraf	2005	Senegal Premier League					—					
Diaraf	2006	Senegal Premier League					—					
Diaraf	Total		36	14	0	0	0	0	0	0	36	14
Al Ain	2008–09	UAE Pro League	20	8		1	6	2	—		26	11
Total			20	8		1	6	2	0	0	26	11
Al-Karamah (loan)	2006–07	Syrian Premier League		3			—		7 (Note: Appearances in AFC Champions League)	3		
Al-Karamah (loan)	2007–08	Syrian Premier League	10	10			—					
Al-Karamah (loan)	Total			13	0	0	0	0	7	3		16
Raja Casablanca (loan)	2007–08	Botola	17	8	0	0	—			1 (Note: Goals in Arab Club Champions Cup)	17	9
Baniyas	2009–10	UAE Pro League	20	12	0	0	4	2	—		24	14
Baniyas	2010–11	UAE Pro League	22	18		2	8	3	—		30	23
Baniyas	2011–12	UAE Pro League	21	16	4	3	8	2	7	2	37	23
Baniyas	2012–13	UAE Pro League	20	14	2	1	5	2	+2 (Note: Appearances in GCC Champions League)	2	+27	17
Baniyas	Total		83	60	6	6	25	9	9	4	123	79
Al-Wasl	2013–14	UAE Pro League	15	5	2	1	5	0	—		22	6
Shenzhen Ruby	2015	China League One	28	10	1	0	—		—		29	10
Nei Mongol Zhongyou	2016	China League One	12	9	0	0	—		—		12	9
Nei Mongol Zhongyou	2017	China League One	29	16	1	0	—		—		30	16
Nei Mongol Zhongyou	2018	China League One	28	20	0	0	—		—		28	20
Nei Mongol Zhongyou	2019	China League One	27	13	0	0	—		—		27	13
Nei Mongol Zhongyou	2020	China League One	13	3	0	0	—		—		13	3
Nei Mongol Zhongyou	Total		109	61	1	0	0	0	0	0	110	61
Cangzhou Mighty Lions	2021	Chinese Super League	16	2	2	1	—		—		18	3
Career total			344	167	13	9	36	11	16	8	395	204
