= 2010–11 Botola =

Moroccan football league season

Botola
- Season: 2010–11
- CAF Champions League: Raja CA; Maghreb Fez
- CAF Confederation Cup: WAC Casablanca; CODM Meknès (cup finalist)

The 2010–11 Botola is the 54th season of the Moroccan Premier League. It began on 21 August 2010. Wydad Casablanca are the holders of the title.

== Overview ==
=== Stadia and locations ===
Team	Stadium	Capacity	Previous Season
Chabab Massira	Stade Cheikh Laaghdef	25,000	
Chabab Rif Hoceima	Stade Mimoun Al Arsi	12,000	2009–2010 Botola 2 Runners-Up (Promoted)
Difaa El Jadida	Stade El Abdi	6,000	
FAR Rabat	Stade Moulay Abdellah	52,000	
FUS Rabat	Stade Moulay Abdellah	52,000	
Hassania Agadir	Stade Al Inbiaâte	5,000	
JSK Chabab Kasba Tadla	Complexe OCP	10,000	2009–2010 Botola 2 Champions (Promoted)
KAC Kenitra	Stade Municipal de Kénitra	15,000	
Kawkab Marrakech	Stade de Marrakech/ Stade El Harti	45,240	
Maghreb Fez	Fez Stadium	45,000	
Moghreb Tétouan	Stade Saniat Rmel	11,000	
Olympic Safi	Stade El Massira	7,000	
Olympique Khouribga	Stade OCP	5,000	
Raja CA	Stade Mohamed V	55,000	2009–2010 Botola Runners-Up
Widad Fez	Fez Stadium	45,000	
Wydad Casablanca	Stade Mohamed V	55,000	2009–2010 Botola Champions

Source: Soccerway.com

== League table ==
Pos	Team	Pld	W	D	L	GF	GA	GD	Pts	Qualification or relegation
1	Raja CA (C)	30	18	6	6	45	23	+22	60	Qualification for 2012 CAF Champions League
2	Maghreb Fez	30	14	11	5	34	23	+11	53	Qualification for 2012 CAF Champions League
3	WAC Casablanca	30	13	12	5	31	18	+13	51	Qualification for 2012 CAF Confederation Cup
4	Olympique Khouribga	30	14	8	8	31	20	+11	50	
5	Olympic Safi	30	12	13	5	31	25	+6	49	
6	FAR Rabat	30	10	10	10	28	27	+1	40	
7	FUS Rabat	30	8	14	8	22	21	+1	38	
8	Moghreb Tétouan	30	8	12	10	26	28	−2	36	
9	Hassania Agadir	30	8	12	10	22	24	−2	36	
10	Difaa El Jadida	30	7	14	9	25	25	0	35	
11	Chabab Massira	30	8	10	12	24	35	−11	34	
12	Chabab Rif Hoceima	30	6	15	9	21	24	−3	33	
13	KAC Kenitra	30	6	14	10	16	24	−8	32	
14	Widad Fez	30	6	13	11	21	30	−9	31	
15	Kawkab Marrakech (R)	30	4	16	10	19	25	−6	28	Relegation to GNF 2
16	JSK Chabab Kasba Tadla (R)	30	4	8	18	17	41	−24	20	Relegation to GNF 2

Updated to match(es) played on 25 May 2011. Source: Soccerway.com
Rules for classification: 1) points; 2) goal difference; 3) number of goals scored.
(C) Champions; (R) Relegated
- CODM Meknès also qualified for the 2012 CAF Confederation Cup as the 2011 Coupe du Trône finalist.

== See also ==
- 2010–11 GNF 2
