= 2008–09 Arab Champions League =

دوري أبطال العرب 2008–09

Tournament details
- Dates: 4 October 2008 – 22 May 2009
- Teams: 35 (from 1 association)

Final positions
- Champions: (Tunisia) Espérance (2nd title)
- Runners-up: (Morocco) Wydad Casablanca

Tournament statistics
- Matches played: 62
- Goals scored: 140 (2.26 per match)
- Top scorer(s): (Algeria) Abdelmalek Ziaya (Jordan) Mahmoud Shelbaieh (Morocco) Rafik Abdessamad (5 goals each)

The 6th edition of Arab Champions League, The 2008–2009 is going to play as a knockout stage from 35 clubs, The Algerian club ES Sétif entered automatically as 2007–08 champion.

== Format ==
- Each federation enter with (1~2) teams from their top Leagues

– The teams must be one of the top 5 teams in the latest season, or Cup Champions/Runners-up.

- The Number of teams of each federation enters based on the previous editions results of the Arab Champions League
- The official sponsor ART can choose the rest teams to complete the 32 teams, so it may can reach 3 teams from one country

– It's not necessary to be one of the top 5 teams.

- The Algerian club ES Sétif entered automatically as 2007–08 champion.

== Participated teams ==
- 35 clubs will be competing from the following countries.

=== Asia ===
Bahrain (1)	Busaiteen (Bahraini PL 2007-08 Runners-up)
Iraq (1)	Al-Quwa Al-Jawiya (Iraqi Premier League 2007-08 3rd Place)
Jordan (3)	Al-Wahdat (Jordan League 2007–08 Champion); Al-Faisaly (Jordan League 2007–08 Runners-up); Shabab Al-Ordon (Jordan League 2007–08 3rd Place)
Kuwait (3)	Kuwait SC (Kuwaiti PL 2007-08 Champion); Al-Qadisiya (Kuwaiti PL 2007-08 Runners-up); Al Arabi Kuwait (Kuwaiti PL 2007-08 4th Place)
Lebanon (1)	Al-Ansar (LPL 2007–08 Runners-up)
Qatar (0)	Withdraw
Oman (1)	Dhofar (2007-08 Omani League Runners-up)
Palestine (1)	Taraji Wadi Al-Nes (West Bank League 2007–08 Champion)
Saudi Arabia (2)	Al-Hazm (Saudi Champions Cup 2007–08 3rd Place); Al-Wahda Mecca (Saudi PL 2007-08 Wild-card)
Syria (2)	Al-Ittihad Aleppo (Syrian PL 2007-08 3rd Place); Al-Taliya (Syrian PL 2007-08 4th Place)
UAE (1)	Al-Shaab (UAE League 2007–08 5th Place)
Yemen (1)	Al-Hilal Al-Sahili (Yemeni League 2007–08 Champion)

=== Africa ===
Algeria (3)	ES Sétif (Arab CL 2007–08 Champions, Algerian CN 2007–08 3rd Place); USM Alger (Algerian CN 2007–08 4th place); USM Annaba (Algerian CN 2007–08 Wild-card)
Comoros (1)	Jakam (Representing Comoros)
Djibouti (1)	FC Société Immobilière de Djibouti (Djibouti PL 2007-08 Champion)
Egypt (1)	Ismaily SC (Egyptian PL 2007-08 Runner-up)
Libya (2)	Al-Ittihad Tripoli (Libyan PL 2007-08 Champions); Al-Ahly Tripoli (Libyan PL 2007-08 Runner-up)
Mauritania (1)	ASC Nasr de Sebkha (Representing Mauritania)
Morocco (3)	Raja Casablanca (Botola 2007-08 3rd Place); Hassania Agadir (Botola 2007-08 4th Place); Wydad Casablanca (Botola 2007-08 Wild-card)
Somalia (1)	SITT Daallo (Representing Somalia)
Sudan (2)	Al-Hilal Club (Omdurman) (Sudan PL 2007-2008 Champion); Al-Merrikh (Sudan PL 2007-2008 Runner-up)
Tunisia (3)	Espérance Sportive de Tunis (Ligue 1 2007–08 3rd Place); US Monastir (Ligue 1 2007–08 4th Place); CS Sfaxien (Ligue 1 2007–08 Wild-card)

== The System ==
- The Qualifying: Knock out stage
- Round 32: Knock out stage
- Round 16: Knock out stage
- Round 8: Knock out stage
- Semifinals and final: Knock out stage

== The Awards ==
- The Champions: 1,000,000 $
- The Runner-up: 650,000 $
- Round 4: 200,000 $
- Round 8: 100,000 $
- Round 16: 40,000 $
- Round 32: 20,000 $
- Qualifying: 5,000 $

== The qualifying Stage ==
- 4 teams play 1 leg match as Knock out stage.
- 1 team qualify to the next stage (Round 32).

Semi-finals
4 October 2008 – Djibouti
(Palestine) Taraji Wadi Al-Nes	4
(Comoros) Jakam	1
6 October 2008 – Djibouti
(Djibouti) Société Immobilière	2(p)
(Somalia) SITT Daallo	2

Final
10 October 2008 – Djibouti
(Palestine) Taraji Wadi Al-Nes	4
(Djibouti) Société Immobilière	2

== Round 32 ==
32 teams play home and away matches as Knock out stage.

Team 1	Agg.	Team 2	1st leg	2nd leg
ES Sétif (Algeria)	3–2	(Lebanon) Al-Ansar	3–2	0–0
Al-Quwa Al-Jawiya (Iraq)	2–1	(Morocco) Hassania Agadir	2–1	0–0
USM Alger (Algeria)	4–3	(Saudi Arabia) Al-Wahda Mecca	3–0	1–3
Al-Ittihad Aleppo (Syria)	0–0 (4–2)	(Algeria) USM Annaba	0–0	0–0
Wydad Casablanca (Morocco)	5–0	(Jordan) Shabab Al-Ordon	3–0	2–0
Al-Wahdat (Jordan)	3–1	(Oman) Dhofar	2–1	1–0
Ismaily (Egypt)	7–2	(Bahrain) Busaiteen	3–1	4–1
Al-Ittihad Tripoli (Libya)	2–3	(Tunisia) US Monastir	1–1	1–2
CS Sfaxien (Tunisia)	3–0	(Mauritania) ASC Nasr de Sebkha	3–0	0–0
Espérance Sportive de Tunis (Tunisia)	0–0 (9–8)	(Libya) Al-Ahly Tripoli	0–0	0–0
Raja Casablanca (Morocco)	6–2	(Syria) Al-Taliya	4–0	2–2
Al-Faisaly (Jordan)	2–1	(Palestine) Taraji Wadi Al-Nes	0–0	2–1
Kuwait SC	(w/o) ^{1}	(Yemen) Al-Hilal Al-Sahili	3–0	Canceled
Al-Qadisiya (Kuwait)	(w/o) ^{1}	(Saudi Arabia) Al-Hazm	–	–
Al-Hilal Club (Omdurman) (Sudan)	(w/o) ^{1}	(Kuwait) Al-Arabi	–	–
Al-Merrikh (Sudan)	(w/o) ^{2}	(United Arab Emirates) Al-Shaab	–	–

^{1} The Kuwaiti clubs' matches canceled due to FIFA's freezing of the membership of the Kuwait Football Association.
^{2} (United Arab Emirates) Al-Shaab withdrew.

=== Round 32 Matches Dates ===
- The first legs on 28 and 29 October 2008
- The second legs on 25 and 26 November 2008

== Round 16 ==
16 teams play home and away matches as Knock out stage.

=== Qualified teams ===
- (Algeria) ES Sétif
- (Algeria) USM Alger
- (Egypt) Ismaily
- (Iraq) Al-Quwa Al-Jawiya
- (Jordan) Al-Faisaly
- (Jordan) Al-Wahdat
- (Morocco) Raja Casablanca
- (Morocco) Wydad Casablanca
- (Saudi Arabia) Al-Hazm
- (Sudan) Al-Hilal Club (Omdurman)
- (Sudan) Al-Merrikh
- (Syria) Al-Ittihad Aleppo
- (Tunisia) Espérance Sportive de Tunis
- (Tunisia) CS Sfaxien
- (Tunisia) US Monastir
- (Yemen) Al-Hilal Al-Sahili

=== Round 16 Matches ===
Team 1	Agg.	Team 2	1st leg	2nd leg
Al-Hilal Al-Sahili (Yemen)	2–8	(Tunisia) Espérance Sportive de Tunis	1–2	1–6
Al-Quwa Al-Jawiya (Iraq)	1–3	(Tunisia) US Monastir	1–1	0–2
Ismaily (Egypt)	7–2	(Algeria) USM Alger	3–1	4–1
Al-Hazm (Saudi Arabia)	1–5	(Jordan) Al-Faisaly	0–2	1–3
Al-Merrikh (Sudan)	7–8	(Jordan) Al-Wahdat	3–1	4–7
CS Sfaxien (Tunisia)	1–0	(Morocco) Raja Casablanca	0–0	1–0
Al-Ittihad Aleppo (Syria)	1–2	(Morocco) Wydad Casablanca	1–0	0–2
Al-Hilal Omdurman (Sudan)	(w/o) ^{1}	(Algeria) ES Sétif	1–2	Withdrew

^{1} (Sudan) Al-Hilal Omdurman withdrew.

=== Round 16 Matches Dates ===
- The first legs on 16 December 2008
- The second legs on 26 December 2008

== Quarter-finals ==
8 teams play home and away matches as Knock out stage.

=== Qualified teams ===
- (Algeria) ES Sétif
- (Egypt) Ismaily
- (Jordan) Al-Faisaly
- (Jordan) Al-Wahdat
- (Morocco) Wydad Casablanca
- (Tunisia) CS Sfaxien
- (Tunisia) Espérance Sportive de Tunis
- (Tunisia) US Monastir

=== Quarter-finals Matches ===
Team 1	Agg.	Team 2	1st leg	2nd leg
Al-Faisaly (Jordan)	2–7	(Tunisia) CS Sfaxien	2–3	0–4
Ismaily (Egypt)	3–3 (3–4)	(Tunisia) Espérance Sportive de Tunis	1–2	2–1
US Monastir (Tunisia)	2–4	(Algeria) ES Sétif	1–1	1–3
Al-Wahdat (Jordan)	2–5	(Morocco) Wydad Casablanca	2–1	0–4

=== Quarter-final Match Dates ===
- The first legs between 1 March 2009 and 4 March 2009
- The second legs between 19 March 2009 and 21 March −2009

== Semi-finals ==
4 teams play home and away matches as Knock out stage.

=== Semi-finals Matches ===
Team 1	Agg.	Team 2	1st leg	2nd leg
ES Sétif (Algeria)	0–3	(Tunisia) Espérance Sportive de Tunis	0–1	0–2
CS Sfaxien (Tunisia)	1–3	(Morocco) Wydad Casablanca	1–1	0–2

==== First Legs ====
11 April 2009
19:00 GMT

(Algeria) ES Sétif	0–1	(Tunisia) Espérance Sportive de Tunis
Smail Diss (yellow card) 32'; Abdelmalek Ziaya (yellow card) 38'	Report (in Arabic)	Oussama Darragi 75'

Stade 8 Mai 1945, Sétif

12 April 2009
18:00 GMT

(Tunisia) CS Sfaxien	1–1	(Morocco) Wydad Casablanca
Blaise Kouassi 45'		Younes Menkari 75'

Stade Taïeb Mhiri, Sfax
Referee: (Saudi Arabia) Abdulrahman Al Amri

==== Second Legs ====
25 April 2009
17:00 GMT

(Morocco) Wydad Casablanca	2–0	(Tunisia) CS Sfaxien
Hicham Louissi 55' (yellow card) 55'; Fouzi El Brazi (yellow card) 58'; Mustapha Bidoudane (yellow card) 62' (goal) 90+1'; Nadir Lamyaghri (yellow card) 87'	Report (in Arabic)	Aymen Ben Amor (yellow card) 58'; Issam Merdassi (yellow card) 86'

Stade Mohamed V, Casablanca
Referee: (United Arab Emirates) Fareed Al Marzouqi

26 April 2009
15:30 GMT

(Tunisia) Espérance Sportive de Tunis	2–0	(Algeria) ES Sétif
Zine El Abidine Souissi 8'; Wajdi Bouazzi 87'	Report (in Arabic)

Stade 7 Novembre, Rades
Referee: (Egypt) Essam Abd El Fatah

== Final ==
=== First leg ===
9 May 2009
17:00 GMT

(Morocco) Wydad Casablanca	0–1	(Tunisia) Espérance Sportive de Tunis
Younes Menkari (yellow card) 45+2'	Report (in Arabic)	Mickael Eneramo 30'; Khaled Korbi (yellow card) 58'; Wajdi Bouazzi (yellow card) 90+2'

Stade Mohamed V, Casablanca
Referee: (Syria) Muhsen Basma

=== Second leg ===
21 May 2009

(Tunisia) Espérance Sportive de Tunis	1–1	(Morocco) Wydad Casablanca
Oussama Darragi 89' (pen.)		Rafik Abdessamad 66' (pen.); Mustapha Bidoudane (red card) 75'; Fouzi El Brazi (red card) 90+4'

Stade 7 November, Rades
Referee: (United Arab Emirates) Ali Hamad Al-Badwawi

Team 1	Agg.	Team 2	1st leg	2nd leg
Wydad Casablanca (Morocco)	1–2	(Tunisia) Espérance Sportive de Tunis	0–1	1–1

== Champions ==
Arab Champions League 2008–09
Winners

Espérance Sportive de Tunis
Second Title

== Top scorers ==
Rank	Name	Team	Goals
1	(Algeria) Abdelmalek Ziaya	(Algeria) ES Sétif	5
1	(Jordan) Mahmoud Shelbaieh	(Jordan) Al-Wihdat	5
1	(Morocco) Rafik Abdessamad	(Saudi Arabia) Al-Wahda	5
2	(Morocco) Mustapha Bidoudane	(Morocco) Wydad Casablanca	4
2	(Iraq) Mustafa Karim	(Egypt) Ismaily	4
2	(Tunisia) Haikel Gmamdia	(Tunisia) CS Sfaxien	4
2	(Jordan) Ra'fat Ali	(Jordan) Al-Wihdat	4
2	(Egypt) Abdallah Said	(Egypt) Ismaily	4
2	(Nigeria) Michael Eneramo	(Tunisia) Espérance	4
2	(Tunisia) Hichem Essifi	(Tunisia) US Monastir	4
3	(Tunisia) Oussama Darragi	(Tunisia) Espérance	3
3	(Tunisia) Wajdi Bouazzi	(Tunisia) Espérance	3
3	(Morocco) Hassan Taïr	(Morocco) Raja Casablanca	3
3	(Sudan) Abdelhameed Amarri	(Sudan) Al-Merreikh	3
3	(Egypt) Mohab Said	(Egypt) Ismaily	3
4	14 players		2
5	54 players		1

- Source: Goalzz.com
