= 2007–08 Kuwaiti Premier League =

- Season: 2007–08
- Dates: December 2007- April 2008
- Teams: 9
- Champions: Al Kuwait
- Matches: 72
- Goals: 191 (2.65 per match)
- Top goalscorer: (Kuwait) Ahmad Ajab 14 Goals

The 2007–08 Kuwaiti Premier League season is the 46th since its establishment. The first matches of the season were played on 7 December 2007, and the final matchday was on the 4 April 2008.

Al Kuwait won the title for the 3rd successive time.

== Current standings ==
As of 4 April 2008

Pos	Team	Pld	W	D	L	GF	GA	GD	Pts
1	Al Kuwait	16	11	2	3	25	10	+15	35
2	Al Qadsia	16	10	4	2	33	11	+22	34
3	Al Salmiya	16	10	4	2	29	14	+15	34
4	Al Arabi	16	8	3	5	25	13	+12	27
5	Kazma	16	8	3	5	28	18	+10	27
6	Al Tadamon	16	4	4	8	13	26	−13	16
7	Al Naser	16	4	3	9	16	30	−14	15
8	Sahel	16	2	2	12	9	32	−23	8
9	Al-Jahra	16	1	3	12	13	37	−24	6

== Top scorers ==
Scorer	Goals	Team
(Kuwait) Ahmad Ajab	14	Al Qadsia
(Kuwait) Bashar Abdullah	10	Al Salmiya
(Syria) Firas Al Khatib	10	Al Arabi
(Tunisia) Ziad Jaziri	9	Al Kuwait
(Kuwait) Fahad Al Fahad	8	Kazma
