= Abdelouahed Chakhsi =

Moroccan professional footballer

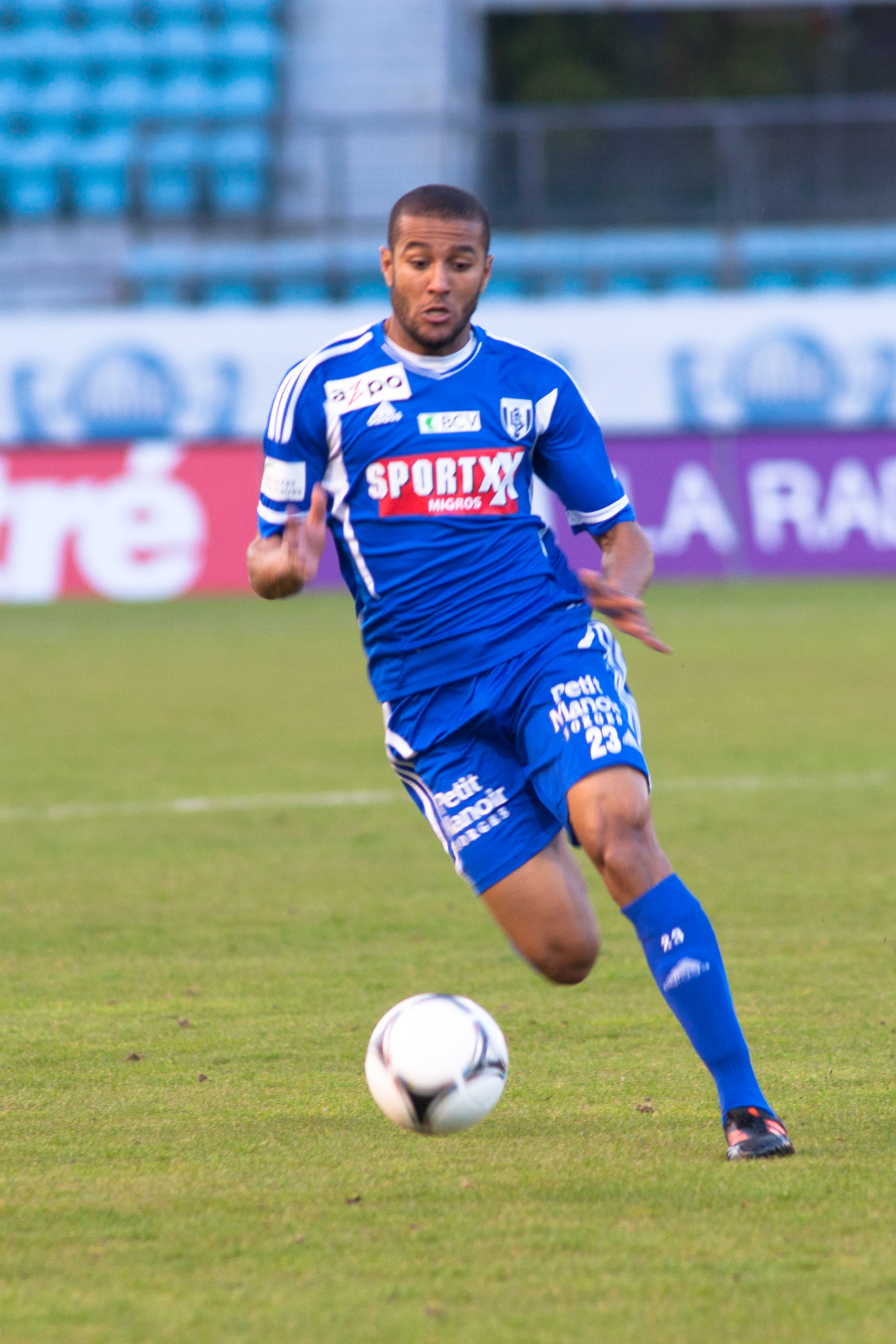

Personal information
- Date of birth: 1 October 1986 (age 40)
- Place of birth: Morocco
- Height: 1.85 m (6 ft 1 in)
- Position: Right-back

Team information
- Current team: Moghreb Tétouan
- Number: 32

Senior career*
Years	Team	Apps	(Gls)
2004–2007	Raja Casablanca		
2008–2009	Olympique Safi		
2009–2010	Raja Casablanca		
2010–2012	KAC Kénitra	30	(0)
2012–2015	Lausanne-Sport	48	(0)
2015–2017	Kawkab Marrakech	40	(0)
2018	Moghreb Tétouan	12	(0)
2018–2019	FAR Rabat	15	(0)
2019–	Moghreb Tétouan	2	(0)
- * Club domestic league appearances and goals as of 3 May 2018

Abdelouahed Chakhsi (born 1 October 1986) is a Moroccan professional footballer currently playing for Moghreb Tétouan.

== Career ==
In early February 2012, Chakhsi made the move to Europe, transferring from Moroccan club KAC Kénitra to Swiss side Lausanne-Sport. He made his debut on 19 February 2012 against Luzern in a Swiss Super League match that ended in a 0–0 draw.
