= Sheikh Mohamed Laghdaf Stadium =

Multi-use stadium in Laayoune, Western Sahara

Coordinates: 27°09′30″N 13°12′48″W

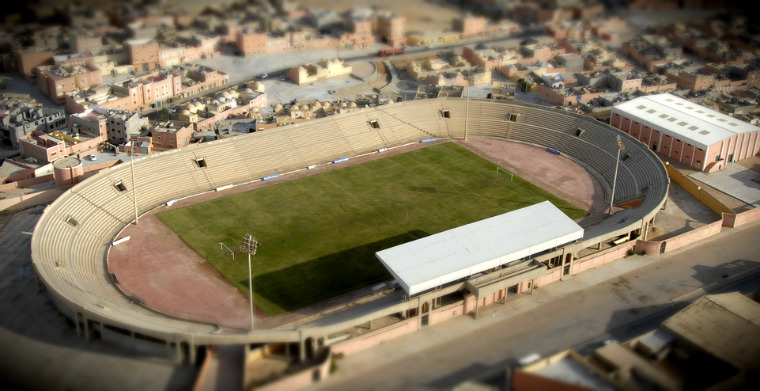
- Interactive map of Sheikh Mohamed Laghdaf Stadium
- Location: Laayoune, Western Sahara
- Operator: JS Massira
- Capacity: 15,000 (all-seated)
- Surface: artificial turf

Construction
- Opened: 1984
- Renovated: 2010

Tenants
- JS Massira; AMFF Laâyoune (Women)

Sheikh Mohamed Laghdaf Stadium (Arabic: ملعب الشيخ محمد لغضف) is a multi-use stadium located in Laayoune, Western Sahara, occupied by Morocco. It is used mostly for football matches. The stadium has a maximum capacity of 15,000 people and is home the JS Massira football club of Laayoune who plays in the Moroccan championship Botola.
