= Raja Al Hoceima =

Moroccan football club

Raja Al-Hoceima
- Full name: Raja Al Hoceima
- Founded: 1995
- Ground: Stade Mimoun Al Arsi
- Capacity: 12,000
- League: Regional League
- 2025-26: 2nd of 9 (Group 2)

Raja Al Hoceima are a Moroccan football club, based in Al Hoceima, The football club plays in the Regional League, the highest division in Moroccan regional football. Raja Al Hoceima plays its matches in the Stade Mimoun Al Arsi, a stadium which houses 12,000 seats.

== History ==
Founded in 1995, Raja Al Hoceima were promoted in 2009 to the Botola Pro 2 for the first time in their history. The football club managed to end ninth in their first season.

== Honours ==
- Champion du Maroc GNFA 1 – Groupe Est: 1
  - 2009
