= Youness Mankari =

Moroccan footballer

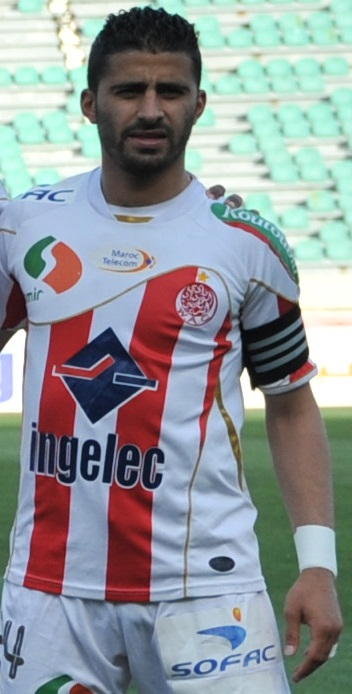

Personal information
- Date of birth: 28 April 1983 (age 43)
- Place of birth: Casablanca, Morocco
- Height: 1.73 m (5 ft 8 in)
- Position: Midfielder

Team information
- Current team: Widad Fez

Youth career
- Wydad Casablanca

Senior career*
Years	Team	Apps	(Gls)
1997–2009	Wydad Casablanca		
2004–2005	→ Kawkab Marrakech (loan)	23	(0)
2009–2010	Al-Ettifaq	8	(1)
2010	Al-Kharitiyat	9	(0)
2010–2014	Wydad Casablanca	67	(3)
2014–	Widad Fez		

International career
2004–	Morocco	12	(0)
- * Club domestic league appearances and goals

Youness Mankari (born 28 April 1983, in Casablanca) is a Moroccan international footballer who currently plays for Widad Fez. He was designated best midfielder of the Moroccan League for the season 2008/2009.
