= Omar Najdi =

Moroccan footballer

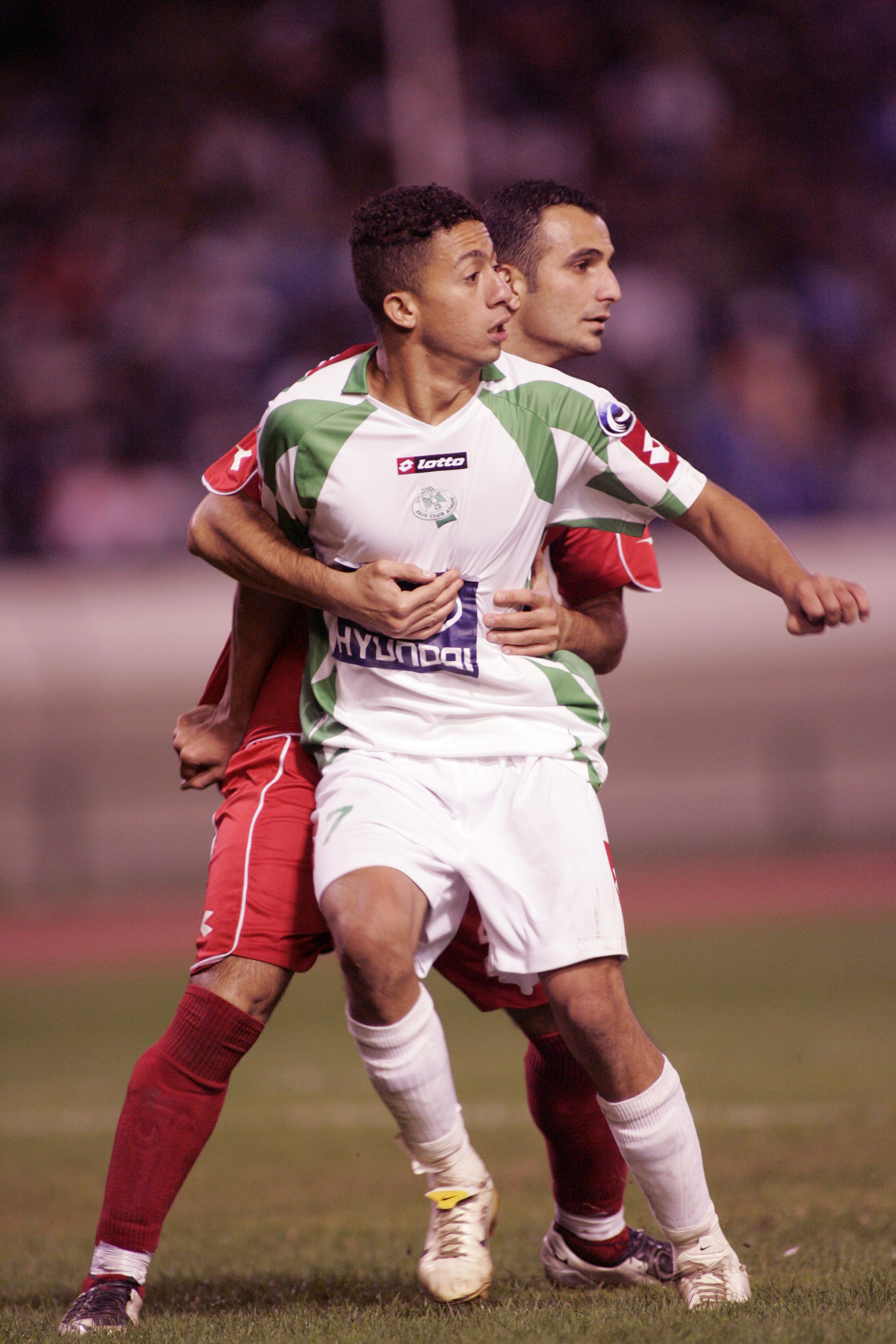

Personal information
- Full name: Omar Najdi
- Date of birth: 24 October 1986 (age 40)
- Place of birth: Agadir, Morocco
- Height: 1.70 m (5 ft 7 in)
- Position: Forward

Senior career*
Years	Team	Apps	(Gls)
2005–2008	Hassania Agadir	?	(?)
2008–2011	Raja Casablanca	37	(16)
2011–2012	Misr Lel-Makkasa	25	(6)
2012–2014	Wydad Casablanca	45	(7)
2014–2016	Misr Lel-Makkasa	55	(8)
2016–2017	Al-Shaab		
2018	Petrojet		
2018–2019	IR Tanger	3	(0)

International career^{‡}
2008–2010	Morocco U23	1	(0)
- * Club domestic league appearances and goals as of 00:00, 20 August 2019 (UTC) ‡ National team caps and goals as of 00:00, 23 December 2011 (UTC)

Omar Najdi (Arabic: عمر نجدي; born 24 September 1986) is a Moroccan former professional footballer who played as a forward. He previously played for Hassania Agadir where he began his career, Raja Casablanca, Misr Lel-Makkasa SC, Wydad Casablanca, Al-Shaab CSC, Petrojet SC and lastly Ittihad Tanger where he retired.
