= Hicham El Amrani =

Moroccan footballer

Personal information
- Full name: Hicham El Amrani
- Date of birth: November 25, 1985 (age 40)
- Place of birth: Casablanca, Morocco
- Height: 1.88 m (6 ft 2 in)
- Position: Defender

Team information
- Current team: Association Sportive des FAR
- Number: 15

Youth career
- ?–2002: Rachad Bernoussi

Senior career*
Years	Team	Apps	(Gls)
2002–2006	Rachad Bernoussi		
2006–2007	Kawkab Marrakech		
2007–2009	Raja Casablanca		
2009–2010	Moghreb Tétouan		
2011–2015	Wydad Casablanca		
2015–...	Association Sportive des FAR		

International career
2004–2005	Morocco U-20		
2006–2008	Morocco U-23		
- * Club domestic league appearances and goals

Hicham El Amrani (born November 25, 1985) is a Moroccan footballer.

== International career ==
The defender played for Morocco at the 2005 FIFA World Youth Championship in the Netherlands.
