= 2007–08 Botola =

Moroccan football league season

Botola
- Season: 2007–08
- Champions: FAR Rabat (12th title)
- Relegated: FUS Rabat; COD Meknès

The 2007–08 season of the Botola, the first division of Moroccan football.

== Table ==
Pos	Team	Pld	W	D	L	GF	GA	GD	Pts	Qualification or relegation
1	FAR Rabat	30	14	11	5	36	23	+13	53	2009 CAF Champions League
2	Ittihad Khemisset	30	14	8	8	34	23	+11	50	2009 CAF Champions League
3	Raja Casablanca	30	12	12	6	32	23	+9	48	2008–09 Arab Champions League
4	Hassania Agadir	30	11	13	6	23	14	+9	46	2008–09 Arab Champions League
5	Difaa El Jadida	30	12	10	8	29	26	+3	46	
6	OC Khouribga	30	10	13	7	32	36	−4	43	
7	Moghreb Tétouan	30	10	12	8	29	19	+10	42	
8	Wydad Casablanca	30	10	12	8	28	23	+5	42	2008–09 Arab Champions League
9	Jeunesse Massira	30	8	14	8	27	28	−1	38	
10	Olympique Safi	30	8	12	10	31	31	0	36	
11	Maghreb Fez	30	9	9	12	27	30	−3	36	2009 CAF Confederation Cup
12	Kawkab Marrakech	30	6	15	9	23	31	−8	33	
13	KAC Kenitra	30	6	13	11	20	33	−13	31	
14	Mouloudia Oujda	30	8	7	15	29	48	−19	31	
15	FUS Rabat	30	4	14	12	23	30	−7	26	Relegated To GNF 2
16	CODM Meknès	30	3	15	12	24	40	−16	24	Relegated To GNF 2
