= Pape Ciré Dia =

Senegalese footballer

Ciré Dia
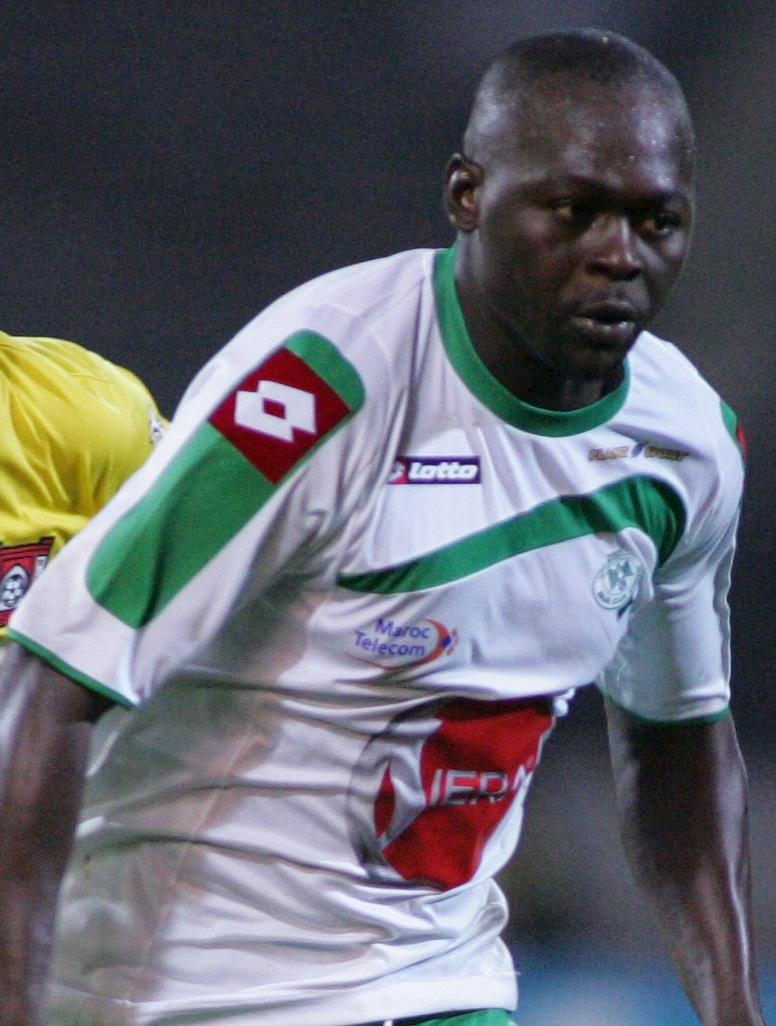

Personal information
- Full name: Pape Ciré Dia
- Date of birth: August 19, 1980 (age 46)
- Place of birth: Dakar, Senegal
- Height: 1.83 m (6 ft 0 in)
- Position: Striker

Senior career*
Years	Team	Apps	(Gls)
1999–2000	ASC Diaraf		
2000–2003	Al Salmiya		
2003–2005	Al Kuwait Kaifan		
2004	ASC Diaraf		(16)
2005–2007	Çaykur Rizespor	38	(7)
2007–2011	Raja Casablanca	68	(6)
2011	ASC Diaraf	13	(5)
2012	Felda United	5	(0)
2013–2016	ASC Diaraf		

International career
1997–2005	Senegal	4	(1)
- * Club domestic league appearances and goals as of February 17, 2010

Pape Ciré Dia (born August 19, 1980) was a Senegalese footballer who played as a Striker.

== Club career ==
Dia debuted with ASC Diaraf, a club that played in the first division. In 2000, he left his country for Kuwait and signed for Al Salmiya Club with which he spent three years. After that, he played two years with Al Kuwait Kaifan.

Dia returned to his first club ASC Diaraf after his adventure abroad, but after a little while he signed for Turkish team Çaykur Rizespor and from there he moved to Raja Casablanca.

In February 2012, Dia joined the Malaysian club Felda United FC. After two months with Felda United FC he was released.

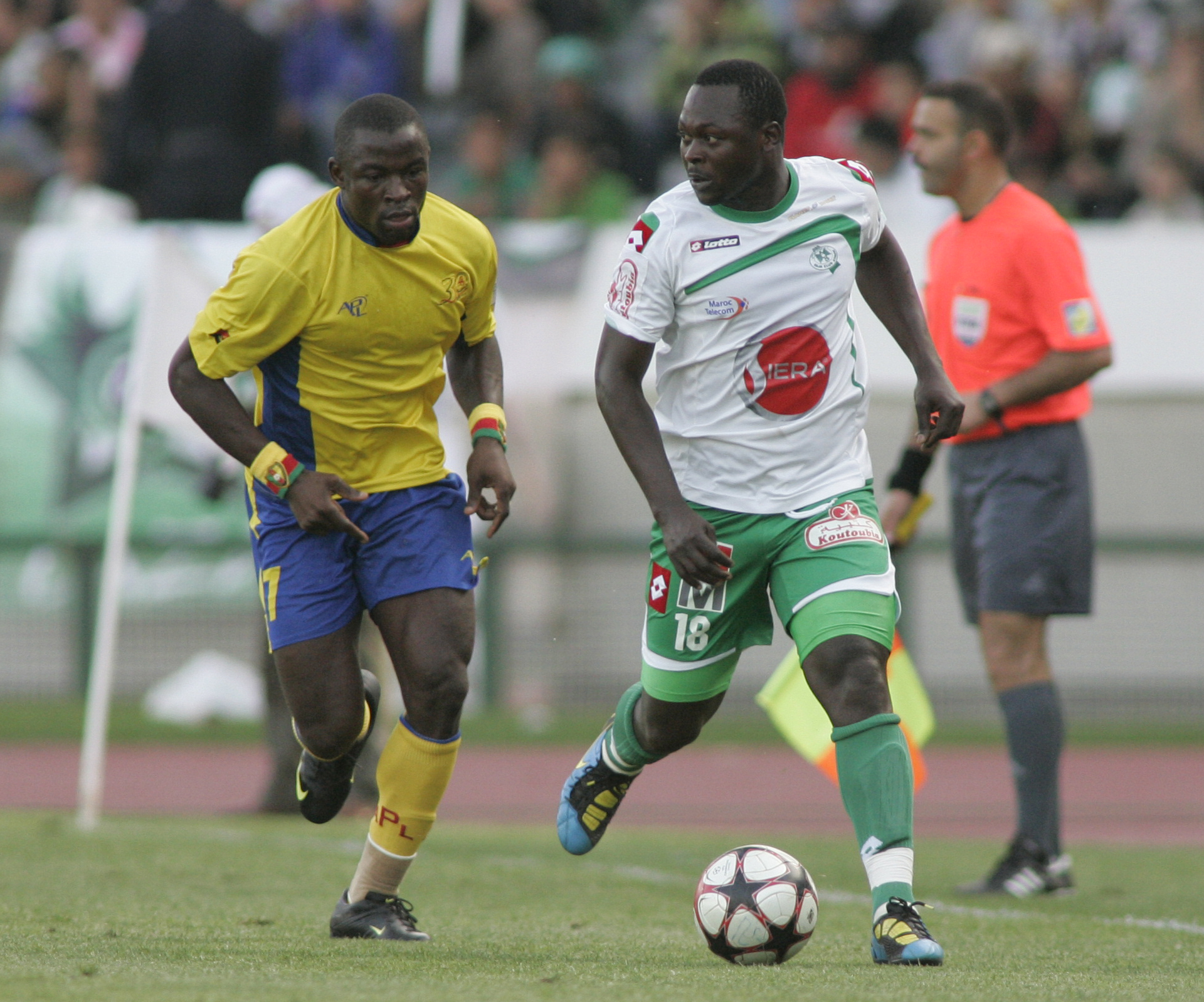
Dia pictured left.

In 2016, Dia announced his retirement from football.
