= Abdellah Jlaidi =

Moroccan footballer

Adellah Jlaidi
Personal information
- Full name: Moulay Abdellah Jlaidi
- Date of birth: 13 May 1981 (age 45)
- Place of birth: Marrakesh, Morocco
- Height: 1.80 m (5 ft 11 in)
- Position: Midfielder

Team information
- Current team: JS Massira

Youth career
- Kawkab Marrakech

Senior career*
Years	Team	Apps	(Gls)
1999–2006	Kawkab Marrakech		
2006–2007	Hassania Agadir		
2007–2011	Raja Casablanca	45	(10)
2011–2012	Widad Fez		
2012–	JS Massira		
- * Club domestic league appearances and goals as of April 16, 2009 ‡ National team caps and goals as of October 17, 2008

Abdellah Jlaidi (born 13 May 1981) is a Moroccan retired footballer who mostly played as a midfielder.

Jlaidi was born in Marrakesh and began playing football with the youth side of local club Kawkab Marrakech. He made his debut in the Moroccan Botola against Hassania Agadir during the 1999–2000 season. He moved to Raja Casablanca in 2007.
