= Mourad Ainy =

Moroccan football defender

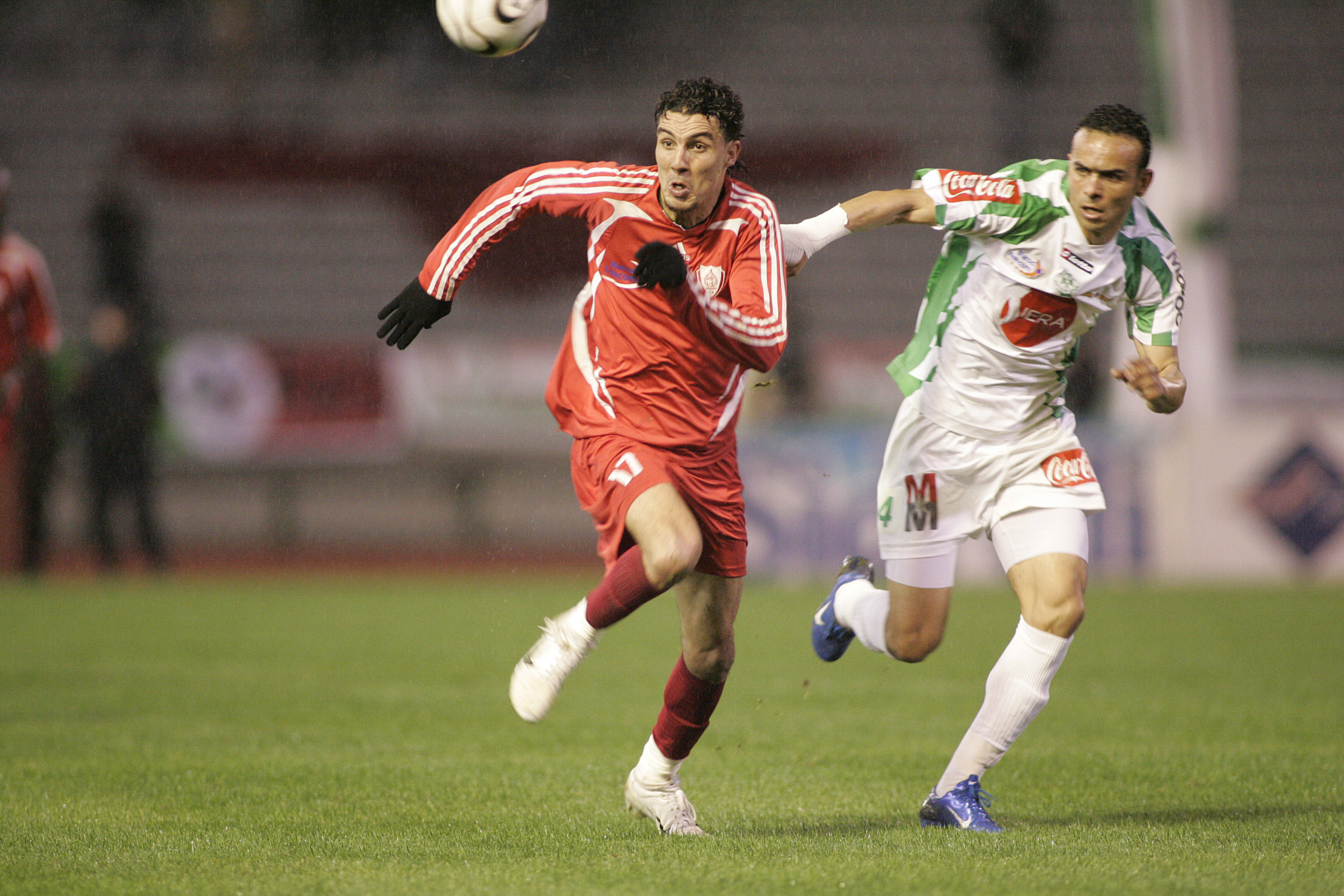

Personal information
- Full name: Mourad Ainy
- Date of birth: 24 March 1980 (age 46)
- Place of birth: Morocco
- Height: 1.84 m (6 ft 0 in)
- Position: Defender

Team information
- Current team: Kawkab Marrakech
- Number: 31

Senior career*
| Years | Team | Apps | (Gls) |
| ?–2005 | Rachad Bernoussi | ? | (?) |
| 2005–2007 | Difaa El Jadida | ? | (?) |
| 2007–2010 | Raja Casablanca | 38 | (1) |
| 2008–2009 | → Al-Wahda (loan) | 0 | (0) |
| 2010– | Kawkab Marrakech | 14 | (3) |

International career
| 2008– | Morocco | 6 | (0) |
- * Club domestic league appearances and goals

Mourad Ainy (born 24 March 1980) is a Moroccan football defender, who currently plays for Kawkab Marrakech.

He received first cap at the friendly match against Belgium on 26 March 2008.
