= 2009–10 Botola =

Moroccan football league season

Botola
- Season: 2009–10
- Champions: Wydad Casablanca
- Promoted: JSK Chabab Kasba Tadla; Chabab Rif Hoceima
- Relegated: Ittihad Khemisset; Association Salé
- 2011 CAF Champions League: Wydad Casablanca; Raja CA
- 2011 CAF Confederation Cup: Difaa El Jadida; FUS Rabat (defending champion and cup winner); Maghreb de Fès (cup runner-up)
- Matches: 30
- Top goalscorer: Omar Hassi (11)

The 2009–10 Botola is the 53rd season of the Moroccan Premier League, also known as the Botola. It began on 28 August 2009.

== Overview ==
=== Stadia and locations ===
Team	Stadium	Home city	Capacity
Association Salé	Stade Boubker Ammar	Salé	5,000
Chabab Massira	Stade Cheikh Laaghdef	Laayoune	25,000
Difaa El Jadida	Stade El Abdi	El Jadida	6,000
FAR Rabat	Stade Moulay Abdellah	Rabat	52,000
FUS Rabat	Stade Moulay Abdellah	Rabat	52,000
Hassania Agadir	Stade Al Inbiaâte	Agadir	5,000
Ittihad Khemisset	Stade du 18 novembre	Khemisset	2,800
KAC Kenitra	Stade Municipal de Kenitra	Kenitra	15,000
Kawkab Marrakech	Marrakesh Stadium	Marrakesh	45,240
Maghreb Fez	Fez Stadium	Fez	45,000
Moghreb Tétouan	Stade Saniat Rmel	Tétouan	11,000
Olympic Safi	Stade El Massira	Safi	7,000
Olympique Khouribga	Stade OCP	Khouribga	5,000
Raja CA	Stade Mohamed V	Casablanca	55,000
Widad Fez	Fez Stadium	Fez	45,000
Wydad Casablanca	Stade Mohamed V	Casablanca	55,000

== Table ==
Pos	Team	Pld	W	D	L	GF	GA	GD	Pts	Qualification or relegation
1	Wydad Casablanca (C)	30	15	9	6	36	22	+14	54	Qualification for 2011 CAF Champions League
2	Raja CA	30	14	10	6	39	26	+13	52	Qualification for 2011 CAF Champions League
3	Difaa El Jadida	30	12	14	4	30	17	+13	50	Qualification for 2011 CAF Confederation Cup
4	Kawkab Marrakech	30	10	14	6	27	19	+8	44	
5	Olympique Khouribga	30	11	10	9	30	26	+4	43	
6	Hassania Agadir	30	10	11	9	33	31	+2	41	
7	FAR Rabat	30	10	10	10	21	20	+1	40	
8	Maghreb Fez	30	9	12	9	29	26	+3	39	Qualification for 2011 CAF Confederation Cup
9	KAC Kenitra	30	10	8	12	28	30	−2	38	
10	Moghreb Tétouan	30	7	15	8	18	18	0	36	
11	Widad Fez	30	9	9	12	33	41	−8	36	
12	FUS Rabat	30	9	9	12	24	30	−6	36	Qualification for 2011 CAF Confederation Cup
13	Chabab Massira	30	8	10	12	26	33	−7	34	
14	Olympic Safi	30	8	9	13	29	37	−8	33	
15	Ittihad Khemisset (R)	30	7	12	11	15	22	−7	33	Relegation to GNF 2
16	Association Salé (R)	30	4	12	14	15	35	−20	24	Relegation to GNF 2

Updated to match(es) played on 10 June 2010. Source: Soccerway.com
Rules for classification: 1) points; 2) goal difference; 3) number of goals scored.
(C) Champions; (R) Relegated
