= 2021–22 Raja CA season =

Raja CA
2021–22 season
- President: Rachid Andaloussi (until 27 october); Anis Mahfoud (until 16 June); Aziz El Badraoui
- Manager: Lassaad Chabbi (until 9 November); Marc Wilmots (from 11 November to 20 February); Mohamed Bekkari (interim, from 21 to 28 February); Rachid Taoussi (from 28 February to 22 June); Bouchaib El Moubarki (interim)
- Stadium: Stade Mohamed V
- Botola: Runners-up
- Moroccan Throne Cup: Quarter-finals
- CAF Champions League: Quarter-finals
- CAF Super Cup: Runners-up
- Top goalscorer: League: Mohsine Moutouali (9 goals); All: Hamid Ahaddad (12 goals)
- Biggest win: 3–0 v JS Soualem (Home, 24 September 2021, Botola)
| Home colours | Away colours | Third colours |

The 2021–22 season is Raja CA's 73rd season in existence and the club's 65th consecutive season in the top flight of Moroccan football. They are competing in Botola, the Throne Cup, CAF Champions League, CAF Super Cup. It was the first season since 2017–18 without Soufiane Rahimi, who joined Al Ain FC.

Raja CA kicked off the season with a 0–1 win against Youssoufia Berrechid in the first match of the league.

== Squad list ==
Players and squad numbers last updated on 31 January 2022.
Note: Flags indicate national team as has been defined under FIFA eligibility rules. Players may hold more than one non-FIFA nationality.

| No. | Name | Nat. | Position | Date of Birth (Age) | Signed from |
Goalkeepers
| 1 | Anas Zniti | (Morocco) | GK | 28 October 1988 (aged 33) | (Morocco) AS FAR |
| 31 | Gaya Merbah | (Algeria) | GK | 22 July 1994 (aged 27) | (Algeria) CR Belouizdad |
| 89 | Marouane Fakhr | (Morocco) | GK | 11 February 1989 (aged 33) | (Morocco) Mouloudia Oujda |
| 12 | Amir El Haddaoui | (Morocco) | GK | 14 September 1999 (aged 22) | (Morocco) Youth system |
Defenders
| 15 | Jamal Harkass | (Morocco) | CB | 24 November 1995 (aged 26) | (Morocco) Mouloudia Oujda |
| 16 | Mohamed Nahiri | (Morocco) | LB | 22 October 1991 (aged 30) | (Saudi Arabia) Al-Aïn FC |
| 20 | Abdeljalil Jbira | (Morocco) | LB | 14 March 1990 (aged 32) | (Morocco) Kawkab Marrakech |
| 24 | Marouane Hadhoudi | (Morocco) | CB | 13 February 1992 (aged 30) | (Morocco) Difaâ Hassani El Jadidi |
| 25 | Abdessamad Badaoui | (Morocco) | RB | 24 August 1999 (aged 22) | (Morocco) JS Soualem |
| 26 | Ilias Haddad | (Morocco) | CB | 1 March 1989 (aged 33) | (Morocco) AS FAR |
| 29 | Abdelilah Madkour | (Morocco) | RB | 11 June 2000 (aged 22) | (Morocco) Youth system |
| 47 | Oussama Soukhane | (Morocco) | LB | 18 September 1999 (aged 22) | (Morocco) Youth system |
| 48 | Mohamed Souboul | (Morocco) | LB | 17 November 2001 (aged 20) | (Morocco) Youth system |
| N/A | Abdelmounaim Boutouil | (Morocco) | CB | 9 January 1998 (aged 24) | (Morocco) Chabab Mohammédia |
Midfielders
| 6 | Fabrice Ngoma | (Democratic Republic of the Congo) | CM | 22 January 1994 (aged 28) | (Democratic Republic of the Congo) AS Vita Club |
| 8 | Badr Boulahroud | (Morocco) | CM | 21 April 1993 (aged 29) | (Spain) Málaga CF |
| 16 | Omar Arjoune | (Morocco) | DM | 1 February 1996 (aged 26) | (Morocco) IR Tanger |
| 18 | Abdelilah Hafidi | (Morocco) | AM | 30 January 1992 (aged 30) | (Morocco) Youth system |
| 19 | Mohamed Zrida | (Morocco) | DM | 1 February 1999 (aged 23) | (Morocco) Youth system |
| 23 | Mohamed Al Makahasi | (Morocco) | CM | 5 February 1995 (aged 27) | (Morocco) Moghreb Tétouan |
| 48 | Mohamed El Mourabit | (Morocco) | AM | 11 September 1998 (aged 23) | (Morocco) Chabab Mohammédia |
| 98 | Zakaria El Wardi | (Morocco) | CM | 17 August 1998 (aged 23) | (Morocco) Moghreb Tétouan |
Forwards
| 2 | Soufiane Benjdida | (Morocco) | ST | 5 September 2001 (aged 20) | (Morocco) Youth system |
| 5 | Mohsine Moutaouali | (Morocco) | AM / RW | 3 March 1986 (aged 36) | (Qatar) Al Ahli SC |
| 7 | Youness Mokhtar | (Morocco) | LW | 29 August 1991 (aged 30) | Unattached |
| 11 | Haitam El Bahja | (Morocco) | LW | 23 December 1993 (aged 28) | (Morocco) JS Soualem |
| 14 | Zakaria Habti | (Morocco) | RW | 6 February 1998 (aged 24) | (Morocco) Youth system |
| 21 | Houssine Rahimi | (Morocco) | ST | 4 February 2002 (aged 20) | (Morocco) Youth system |
| 30 | Abdellah Farah | (Morocco) | LW | 1 June 2001 (aged 21) | (Morocco) Youth system |
| 33 | Hamid Ahadad | (Morocco) | ST | 30 November 1994 (aged 27) | (Egypt) Zamalek SC |
| 39 | Beni Badibanga | (Belgium) | LW | 19 February 1996 (aged 26) | (Belgium) Royal Excel Mouscron |
| 45 | Kadima Kabangu | (Democratic Republic of the Congo) | ST | 15 June 1993 (aged 29) | (Democratic Republic of the Congo) FC Saint Éloi Lupopo |
| 51 | Gibril Sillah | (The Gambia) | RW | 7 December 1998 (aged 23) | (Senegal) Teungueth FC |

== Transfers ==
=== In ===
| Date | Pos | Player | From club | Transfer fee | Source |
|---|---|---|---|---|---|
| 12 August 2021 | DF | (Morocco) Mohamed Nahiri | (Saudi Arabia) Al-Aïn FC | Free agent | |
| 12 August 2021 | FW | (Guinea) Moustapha Kouyaté | (Democratic Republic of the Congo) TP Mazembe | Free agent | |
| 13 August 2021 | MF | (Burkina Faso) Sami Hien | (Burkina Faso) Salitas FC | €10 k | |
| 15 August 2021 | FW | (Morocco) Soufiane Azhari | Rachad Bernoussi | €100 k | |
| 24 August 2021 | FW | (Morocco) Omar El Amrani | (Spain) Malaga CF | Free agent | |
| 27 August 2021 | FW | (The Gambia) Gibril Sillah | (Senegal) Teungueth FC | €40 k | |
| 31 August 2021 | DF | (Morocco) Jamal Harkass | MC Oujda | Free agent | |
| 31 August 2021 | FW | (Morocco) Hamid Ahaddad | (Egypt) Zamalek SC | Free agent | |
| 31 August 2021 | DF | (Morocco) Bouchaib Arrassi | Chabab Mohammédia | Free agent | |
| 8 January 2022 | FW | (Morocco) Haitam El Bahja | JS Soualem | €100 k | |
| 20 January 2022 | FW | (Democratic Republic of the Congo) Kadima Kabangu | (Democratic Republic of the Congo) FC Saint Éloi Lupopo | €140 k | |
| 20 January 2022 | FW | (Belgium) Beni Badibanga | (Belgium) Royal Excel Mouscron | Free agent | |
| 20 January 2022 | GK | (Algeria) Gaya Merbah | (Algeria) CR Belouizdad | Free agent | |
| 20 January 2022 | FW | (Morocco) Youness Mokhtar | Unattached | Free agent | |
| 24 January 2022 | GK | (Morocco) Marouane Fakhr | MC Oujda | Free agent | |
| 31 January 2022 | DF | (Morocco) Abdessamad Badaoui | JS Soualem | €113 k | |
| 31 January 2022 | DF | (Morocco) Abdelmounaim Boutouil | Chabab Mohammédia | Loan | |
| 31 January 2022 | MF | (Morocco) Mohamed El Mourabit | Chabab Mohammédia | Loan | |

=== Out ===
| Date | Pos | Player | To club | Transfer fee | Source |
|---|---|---|---|---|---|
| 26 July 2021 | FW | (Democratic Republic of the Congo) Ben Malango | (United Arab Emirates) Sharjah FC | €2 million | |
| 8 August 2021 | DF | (Morocco) Abderrahim Achchakir | Chabab Mohammedia | End of contract | |
| 10 August 2021 | FW | (Morocco) Noah Sadaoui | AS FAR | Released | |
| 13 August 2021 | DF | (Libya) Sanad Al Warfali | Unattached | End of contract | |
| 13 August 2021 | MF | (Morocco) Riad Idbouiguiguine | JS Soualem | Loan | |
| 22 August 2021 | FW | (Morocco) Soufiane Rahimi | (United Arab Emirates) Al Ain FC | €2,57 million | |
| 27 August 2021 | GK | (Morocco) Mohamed Bouamira | Chabab Mohammedia | Released | |
| 27 August 2021 | DF | (Burkina Faso) Soumaila Ouattara | Fath US | €66 k | |
| 27 August 2021 | FW | (Morocco) Ayoub Nanah | Fath US | Released | |
| 31 August 2021 | DF | (Morocco) Mohamed Douik | Chabab Mohammedia | Released | |
| 6 December 2021 | MF | (Burkina Faso) Sami Hien | Unattached | Released | |
| 10 January 2022 | DF | (Morocco) Omar Boutayeb | Unattached | Released | |
| 13 January 2022 | MF | (Morocco) Abdelilah Hafidi | (Saudi Arabia) Al Hazm | €670 k | |
| 11 January 2022 | FW | (Morocco) Houssine Rahimi | RC Oued Zem | Loan | |
| 21 January 2022 | DF | (Morocco) Imrane Fiddi | RCA Zemamra | Loan | |
| 21 January 2022 | DF | (Morocco) Saad Lakohal | Moghreb Tetouan | Loan | |
| 24 January 2022 | FW | (The Gambia) Gibril Sillah | JS Soualem | Loan | |
| 30 January 2022 | FW | (Morocco) Mahmoud Benhalib | Unattached | Released | |

== Pre-season and friendlies ==
| 14 August 2021 Friendly | AS Roma (Italy) | 5–0 | (Morocco) Raja CA | Rome, Italy |
| 20:45 | Mkhitaryan 48'; Shomurodov 17'; Mancini 20'; C. Pérez 85'; Mayoral 89' | Report | | Stadium: Stadio Olimpico |

| 28 August 2021 Friendly | Raja CA | 6–0 | USM Oujda | Casablanca |
| 12:00 | Rahimi; Makahasi; El Amrani; El Azhari (csc) | | | Stadium: Raja-Oasis Sports Complex; Attendance: 0 (close doors) |

| 4 September 2021 Friendly | Olympique Safi | 2–1 | Raja CA | Marrakesh |
| 12:00 | | | Moutouali (pen.) | Stadium: Marrakesh stadium Attendance: 0 |

| 13 January 2022 Friendly | Fath Inzegane | 0–6 | Raja CA | Agadir |
| 12:00 | | | Kouyaté; Moutouali; El Bahja | Stadium: Adrar Stadium; Attendance: 0 |

| 16 January 2022 Friendly | Olympique Dcheira | 0–1 | Raja CA | Agadir |
| 12:00 | | | Kouyaté | Stadium: Adrar Stadium; Attendance: 0 |

== Competitions ==
=== Overview ===
| Competition | First match | Last match | Starting round | Final position | Record | | | | | | | |
| Competition | First match | Last match | Starting round | Final position | Pld | W | D | L | GF | GA | GD | Win % |
|---|---|---|---|---|---|---|---|---|---|---|---|---|
| Botola | 10 September 2021 | 2 July 2022 | Matchday 1 | 2nd | 30 | 17 | 9 | 4 | 41 | 21 | +20 | 56.67 |
| Throne Cup | 6 April 2022 | 7 July 2022 | Round of 32 | Quarter-finals | 3 | 1 | 1 | 1 | 4 | 5 | −1 | 33.33 |
| CAF Champions League | 17 October 2021 | 22 April 2022 | Second round | Quarter-finals | 10 | 7 | 1 | 2 | 13 | 5 | +8 | 70.00 |
| CAF Super Cup | 22 December 2021 | | Final | Runners-up | 1 | 0 | 0 | 1 | 1 | 1 | +0 | 0.00 |
| Total | | | | | 44 | 25 | 11 | 8 | 59 | 32 | +27 | 56.82 |

Last updated: 2 July 2022
Source: Sofascore

=== Botola ===
==== League table ====
| Pos | Team | Pld | W | D | L | GF | GA | GD | Pts | Qualification or relegation |
|---|---|---|---|---|---|---|---|---|---|---|
| 1 | Wydad AC (C) | 30 | 19 | 6 | 5 | 46 | 24 | +22 | 63 | Qualification for Champions League (Note: Wydad AC and Raja CA are participated in the Arab Club Champions Cup group stage.) |
| 2 | Raja CA | 30 | 17 | 9 | 4 | 41 | 21 | +20 | 60 | Qualification for Champions League |
| 3 | AS FAR | 30 | 13 | 9 | 8 | 38 | 29 | +9 | 48 | Qualification for Confederation Cup (Note: AS FAR is participated in the Arab Club Champions Cup Qualifying round.) |
| 4 | Maghreb de Fès | 30 | 9 | 18 | 3 | 28 | 17 | +11 | 45 | |
| 5 | Fath Union Sport | 30 | 11 | 10 | 9 | 34 | 30 | +4 | 43 | |

Source: FRMF.ma
Rules for classification: 1) Points; 2a) Head-to-head goal difference if they are two teams with equal points; 2b) Goal difference if they are more than two teams with equal points; 3) Number of wins; 4) Goals scored; 5) Play-off between involved teams.
(C) Champions

==== Results summary ====
| Overall | | | | | | | | Home | | | | | | Away | | | | | |
| Pld | W | D | L | GF | GA | GD | Pts | W | D | L | GF | GA | GD | W | D | L | GF | GA | GD |
|---|---|---|---|---|---|---|---|---|---|---|---|---|---|---|---|---|---|---|---|
| 30 | 17 | 9 | 4 | 41 | 21 | +20 | 60 | 9 | 4 | 2 | 23 | 11 | +12 | 8 | 5 | 2 | 18 | 10 | +8 |

Last updated: 2 July 2022.
Source: Competitive matches

==== Results by round ====
| Round | 1 | 2 | 3 | 4 | 5 | 6 | 7 | 8 | 9 | 10 | 11 | 12 | 13 | 14 | 15 | 16 | 17 | 18 | 19 | 20 | 21 | 22 | 23 | 24 | 25 | 26 | 27 | 28 | 29 | 30 |
|---|---|---|---|---|---|---|---|---|---|---|---|---|---|---|---|---|---|---|---|---|---|---|---|---|---|---|---|---|---|---|
| Ground | A | H | A | A | H | A | H | A | H | A | H | A | H | H | A | H | A | A | H | A | H | A | H | A | H | A | H | A | H | A |
| Result | W | W | W | W | L | W | D | W | D | D | W | L | W | D | D | D | D | W | W | W | W | W | W | L | W | D | L | W | W | D |
| Position | 2 | 3 | 4 | 1 | 2 | 2 | 2 | 2 | 2 | 2 | 2 | 2 | 2 | 2 | 2 | 2 | 2 | 2 | 2 | 2 | 2 | 2 | 2 | 2 | 2 | 2 | 2 | 2 | 2 | 2 |

Updated to match(es) played on 2 July 2022. Source: Competitive matches
A = Away; H = Home; W = Win; D = Draw; L = Loss

==== Matches ====
| Date | Opponents | Venue | Result | Scorers | Report |
|---|---|---|---|---|---|
| 10 September 2021 | Youssoufia Berrechid | A | 1–0 | Rahimi 60 | Report |
| 19 September 2021 | Olympique Khouribga | H | 2–1 | Ahadad 16' Ngoma 90+4' | Report |
| 24 September 2021 | JS Soualem | H | 3–0 | Ahadad 18', 71' Moutouali 31' (pen.) | Report |
| 28 September 2021 | Ittihad Tanger | A | 1–0 | Benhalib 18' | Report |
| 3 October 2021 | RS Berkane | H | 1–2 | Hadhoudi 78' | Report |
| 20 October 2021 | MC Oujda | A | 3–1 | Farah 5 Ahadad 25' Moutouali 46' | Report |
| 26 October 2021 | Fath US | H | 1–1 | Moutouali 15' | Report |
| 30 October 2021 | Difaâ Hassani El Jadidi | A | 2–0 | Habti 53' Hadhoudi 83' | Report |
| 3 November 2021 | RC Oued-Zem | H | 0–0 | | Report |
| 6 November 2021 | Wydad AC | A | 1–1 | Hadhoudi 80' | Report |
| 19 November 2021 | Chabab Mohammédia | H | 2–1 | Kouyaté 71' Benhalib 87' | Report |
| 23 November 2021 | Olympique Safi | A | 0–1 | | Report |
| 17 December 2021 | Hassania Agadir | H | 1–0 | Benjdida 90+2' | Report |
| 30 December 2021 | Maghreb de Fès | H | 1–1 | Arjoune 8' | Report |
| 2 January 2022 | AS FAR | A | 1–1 | Ahadad 85' | Report |
| 5 February 2022 | Youssoufia Berrechid | H | 1–1 | Benjdida 70' | Report |
| 15 February 2022 | Olympique Khouribga | A | 2–2 | Moutouali 52' (pen.) Benjdida 57' | Report |
| 22 February 2022 | JS Soualem | A | 1–1 | Kabangu 61' | Report |
| 1 March 2022 | Ittihad Tanger | H | 1–0 | Benjdida 77' | Report |
| 6 March 2022 | RS Berkane | A | 2–1 | Moutouali 3' Zrida 69' | Report |
| 25 April 2022 | MC Oujda | H | 2–0 | Benjdida 56' Moutouali 67' | Report |
| 29 April 2022 | Fath US | A | 1–0 | Ahadad 52' | Report |
| 6 May 2022 | Difaâ Hassani El Jadidi | H | 2–0 | Nahiri 67' Benjdida 90+1' | Report |
| 15 May 2022 | RC Oued-Zem | A | 0–1 | | Report |
| 16 June 2022 | Wydad AC | H | 2–0 | Moutouali 43' (pen.), 88' (pen.) | Report |
| 19 June 2022 | Chabab Mohammédia | A | 0–0 | | Report |
| 22 June 2022 | Olympique Safi | H | 2–3 | Ahadad 10' Hadhoudi 45+3' | Report |
| 25 June 2022 | Hassania Agadir | A | 3–2 | Moutouali 34' (pen.) Zrida 77' Benjdida 85' | Report |
| 29 June 2022 | AS FAR | H | 2–1 | Benjdida 23' Badibanga 57' | Report |
| 2 July 2022 | Maghreb de Fès | A | 0–0 | | Report |

=== Throne Cup ===
| 6 April 2022 Round of 32 | JS Kasbah Tadla | 2–1 (a.e.t.) | Raja CA | Beni Mellal |
| 23:00 | | | Ahaddad 110' | Stadium: Stade d'honneur de Beni Mellal; Attendance: 10000; Referee: Mohamed Bellout |

| 10 April 2022 Round of 16 | Raja de Beni Mellal | 3–3 (2–4 p) | Raja CA | Beni Mellal |
| 23:00 | Ait Ouarkhane 35' (pen.); Gharib 46'; Goulouss 57' (pen.) | | Ahaddad 29' (pen.) 29' (pen.), 58'; Harkass 90' | Stadium: Stade d'honneur de Beni Mellal; Attendance: 15000; Referee: Hicham Tamsamani |
| | Penalties |
| | Thali (penalty scored); Kandil (penalty missed); Lamine (penalty missed); Maher (penalty scored) | | (penalty scored) Soukhane; (penalty scored) El Bahja; (penalty scored) Harkass; (penalty scored) Zrida |

| 7 July 2022 Quarter-finals | Wydad AC | 2–0 | Raja CA | Casablanca |
| 18:00 UTC+1 | Attiyat Allah 9'; El Moutaraji 62' | Report | | Stadium: Stade Larbi Zaouli; Attendance: 0 Referee: Jalal Jayid |

=== Champions League ===
==== First round ====
In the qualifying rounds, each tie will be played on a home-and-away two-legged basis. If the aggregate score will be tied after the second leg, the away goals rule was applied, and if still tied, extra time will not be played, and the penalty shoot-out will be used to determine the winner (Regulations III. 13 & 14).

| 17 October 2021 | LPRC Oilers (Liberia) | 0–2 | (Morocco) Raja CA | Stade de Marrakech, Marrakesh (Morocco) |
| 16:00 UTC+1 | | Report | Rahimi 21'; Benhalib 45' | Referee: Daouda Gueye (Senegal) |

| 23 October 2021 | Raja CA (Morocco) | 2–0 | (Liberia) LPRC Oilers | Stade Mohammed V, Casablanca |
| 19:00 UTC+1 | Benhalib 6'; Soukhane 26' | Report | | Referee: Peter Waweru (Kenya) |

==== Group stage ====
===== Group B =====
| Pos | Team | Pld | W | D | L | GF | GA | GD | Pts | Qualification | RCA | ESS | AMZ | HOR |
|---|---|---|---|---|---|---|---|---|---|---|---|---|---|---|
| 1 | (Morocco) Raja CA | 6 | 5 | 0 | 1 | 7 | 2 | +5 | 15 | Advance to knockout stage | — | 1–0 | 1–0 | 1–0 |
| 2 | (Algeria) ES Sétif | 6 | 3 | 0 | 3 | 6 | 5 | +1 | 9 | Advance to knockout stage | 0–1 | — | 2–0 | 3–2 |
| 3 | (South Africa) AmaZulu | 6 | 2 | 1 | 3 | 3 | 6 | −3 | 7 | | 0–2 | 1–0 | — | 1–0 |
| 4 | (Guinea) Horoya | 6 | 1 | 1 | 4 | 5 | 8 | −3 | 4 | | 2–1 | 0–1 | 1–1 | — |

Source: CAF

| 12 February 2022 | Raja CA (Morocco) | 1–0 | (South Africa) AmaZulu | Stade Mohammed V, Casablanca |
| 20:00 UTC+1 | Moutouali 67' | Report | | Referee: Bamlak Tessema Weyesa (Ethiopia) |

| 18 February 2022 | ES Sétif (Algeria) | 0–1 | (Morocco) Raja CA | Stade du 5 Juillet, Algiers (Note: ES Sétif play their group stage home matches at Stade du 5 Juillet, Algiers, instead of their regular home stadium Stade 8 Mai 1945, Sétif, which did not meet CAF requirements.) |
| 20:00 UTC+1 | | Report | Zrida 71' | Referee: Maguette Ndiaye (Senegal) |

| 25 February 2022 | Raja CA (Morocco) | 1–0 | (Guinea) Horoya | Stade Mohammed V, Casablanca |
| 20:00 UTC+1 | Moutouali 67' | Report | | Referee: Dahane Beida (Mauritania) |

| 12 March 2022 | Horoya (Guinea) | 2–1 | (Morocco) Raja CA | General Lansana Conté Stadium, Conakry |
| 16:00 UTC+0 | Mandela 26'; Barry 29' (pen.) | Report | Ahadad 19' | Referee: Boubou Traore (Mali) |

| 18 March 2022 | AmaZulu (South Africa) | 0–2 | (Morocco) Raja CA | Moses Mabhida Stadium, Durban |
| 18:00 UTC+2 | | Report | Ahadad 6'; Haddad 76' | Referee: Joshua Bondo (Botswana) |

| 3 April 2022 | Raja CA (Morocco) | 1–0 | (Algeria) ES Sétif | Stade Mohammed V, Casablanca |
| 21:00 UTC+0 | Hadhoudi 74' | Report | | Attendance: 43,651; Referee: Amin Omar (Egypt) |

==== Knockout stage ====
===== Quarter-finals =====
| 16 April 2022 First leg | Al Ahly (Egypt) | 2–1 | (Morocco) Raja CA | Cairo |
| 22:00 UTC+2 | El Solia 13' (pen.); El Shahat 23' | Report | Zrida 45+1' | Stadium: Al Ahly WE Al Salam Stadium; Referee: Jean Jacques Ndala Ngambo (DR Congo) |

| 22 April 2022 Second leg | Raja CA (Morocco) | 1–1 (2–3 agg.) | (Egypt) Al Ahly | Casablanca |
| 22:00 UTC+0 | Ngoma 5' | Report | Abdelmonem 44' | Stadium: Stade Mohammed V Referee: Maguette Ndiaye (Senegal) |

=== CAF Super Cup ===
| 22 December 2021 | Al Ahly (Egypt) | 1–1 (6–5 p) | (Morocco) Raja CA | Ahmed bin Ali Stadium, Al Rayyan |
| 17:00 GMT (20:00 UTC+3) | Taher 90' | Report | Ibrahim 13' (o.g.) | Referee: Jean-Jacques Ndala Ngambo (DR Congo) |
| | Penalties |
| | Maâloul (penalty scored); Benoun (penalty scored); Tau (penalty scored); Abdel Kader (penalty scored); Taher (penalty scored); Tawfik (penalty scored) | | (penalty scored) Zrida; (penalty scored) El Wardi; (penalty scored) Hadhoudi; (penalty scored) Benhalib; (penalty scored) Moutouali; (penalty missed) Madkour |

== Squad information ==
=== Goals ===
Includes all competitive matches. The list is sorted alphabetically by surname when total goals are equal.

| Rank | Pos. | Player | Botola | Throne Cup | Champions League | Super Cup | Total |
|---|---|---|---|---|---|---|---|
| 1 | FW | (Morocco) Hamid Ahadad | 7 | 3 | 2 | 0 | 12 |
| 2 | AM | (Morocco) Mohsine Moutaouali | 9 | 0 | 2 | 0 | 11 |
| 3 | FW | (Morocco) Soufiane Benjdida | 8 | 0 | 0 | 0 | 8 |
| 4 | DF | (Morocco) Marouane Hadhoudi | 4 | 0 | 1 | 0 | 5 |
| 5 | FW | (Morocco) Mahmoud Benhalib | 2 | 0 | 2 | 0 | 4 |
| 6 | MF | (Morocco) Mohamed Zrida | 2 | 0 | 2 | 0 | 4 |
| 7 | FW | (Morocco) Houssine Rahimi | 1 | 0 | 1 | 0 | 2 |
| 8 | MF | (Democratic Republic of the Congo) Fabrice Ngoma | 1 | 0 | 1 | 0 | 2 |
| 9 | FW | (Belgium) Beni Badibanga | 1 | 0 | 0 | 0 | 1 |
| 10 | DF | (Morocco) Mohamed Nahiri | 1 | 0 | 0 | 0 | 1 |
| 11 | FW | (Democratic Republic of the Congo) Kadima Kabangu | 1 | 0 | 0 | 0 | 1 |
| 12 | DF | (Morocco) Jamal Harkass | 0 | 1 | 0 | 0 | 1 |
| 13 | FW | (Guinea) Moustapha Kouyaté | 1 | 0 | 0 | 0 | 1 |
| 14 | MF | (Morocco) Omar Arjoune | 1 | 0 | 0 | 0 | 1 |
| 15 | DF | (Morocco) Ilias Haddad | 0 | 0 | 1 | 0 | 1 |
| 16 | DF | (Morocco) Oussama Soukhane | 0 | 0 | 1 | 0 | 1 |
| 17 | FW | (Morocco) Zakaria Habti | 1 | 0 | 0 | 0 | 1 |
| 18 | FW | (Morocco) Abdellah Farah | 1 | 0 | 0 | 0 | 1 |
| Own goals | | | 0 | 0 | 0 | 1 | 1 |
| Total | | | 41 | 4 | 13 | 1 | 59 |

=== Assists ===
| Rank | Pos. | Player | Botola | Throne Cup | Champions League | Super Cup | Total |
|---|---|---|---|---|---|---|---|
| 1 | AM | (Morocco) Mohsine Moutaouali | 5 | 0 | 2 | 0 | 7 |
| 2 | AM | (Morocco) Abdelilah Hafidi | 4 | 0 | 0 | 0 | 4 |
| 3 | DF | (Morocco) Abdelilah Madkour | 0 | 0 | 3 | 1 | 4 |
| 4 | FW | (Morocco) Mahmoud Benhalib | 3 | 0 | 0 | 0 | 3 |
| 5 | MF | (Democratic Republic of the Congo) Fabrice Ngoma | 3 | 0 | 0 | 0 | 3 |
| 6 | DF | (Morocco) Mohamed Souboul | 3 | 0 | 0 | 0 | 3 |
| 7 | MF | (Morocco) Zakaria El Wardi | 1 | 0 | 1 | 0 | 2 |
| 8 | FW | (Morocco) Hamid Ahadad | 2 | 0 | 0 | 0 | 2 |
| 9 | FW | (Morocco) Soufiane Benjdida | 2 | 0 | 0 | 0 | 2 |
| 10 | FW | (Belgium) Beni Badibanga | 2 | 0 | 0 | 0 | 2 |
| 11 | DF | (Morocco) Mohamed Nahiri | 1 | 0 | 1 | 0 | 2 |
| 12 | MF | (Morocco) Mohamed Zrida | 1 | 1 | 0 | 0 | 2 |
| 13 | FW | (Morocco) Abdellah Farah | 0 | 1 | 1 | 0 | 2 |
| 14 | DF | (Morocco) Jamal Harkass | 1 | 0 | 1 | 0 | 2 |
| 15 | DF | (Morocco) Abdeljalil Jbira | 1 | 0 | 0 | 0 | 1 |
| 16 | MF | (Morocco) Mohamed Makahasi | 0 | 0 | 1 | 0 | 1 |
| 17 | DF | (Morocco) Oussama Soukhane | 1 | 0 | 0 | 0 | 1 |
| 18 | FW | (Morocco) Houssine Rahimi | 0 | 0 | 1 | 0 | 1 |
| 19 | FW | (Morocco) Haitam El Bahja | 1 | 0 | 0 | 0 | 1 |

== Club awards ==
=== End-of-season awards ===
- Eagle of the Season: Jamal Harkass

=== Eagle of the Month award ===
Awarded monthly to the player that was chosen by fans.

| Month | Player | Ref. |
|---|---|---|
| September | Mohamed Zrida | |
| October | Mohsine Moutouali | |
| November | Anas Zniti | |
| December | Not awarded | |
| January | Not awarded | |
| February | Mohsine Moutouali | |
| March | Gaya Merbah | |
| April | Jamal Harkass | |
| May | Not awarded | |
| June | Soufiane Benjdida | |
