= 2020–21 Raja CA season =

Raja CA
2020–21 season
- President: Jawad Ziyat (until 14 December); Rachid Andaloussi (interim)
- Manager: Jamal Sellami (until 6 April); Mohamed Bekkari (interim, from 7 to 13 April); Lassaad Chabbi
- Stadium: Stade Mohamed V
- Botola: Runners-up
- Moroccan Throne Cup: Quarter-finals
- CAF Champions League: First round
- CAF Confederation Cup: Winners
- Arab Club Champions Cup: Winners
- Top goalscorer: League: Ben Malango (16 goals); All: Ben Malango (25 goals)
- Biggest win: 4–0 v Orlando Pirates (Home, 23 May 2021, Confederation Cup)
Home colours	Away colours	Third colours

The 2020–21 season is Raja CA's 72nd season in existence and the club's 64th consecutive season in the top flight of Moroccan football. They are competing in Botola, the Throne Cup, CAF Champions League, CAF Confederation Cup and Arab Club Champions Cup. The season covered the period from December 2020 to 21 August 2021. It was the first season since 2012–13 without club captain Badr Benoun, who joined Al Ahly.

Raja CA kicked off the season with a 3–3 draw against Fath Union Sport in the first match of the league.

== Squad list ==
Players and squad numbers last updated on 31 December 2020.
Note: Flags indicate national team as has been defined under FIFA eligibility rules. Players may hold more than one non-FIFA nationality.

No.	Name	Nat.	Position	Date of Birth (Age)	Signed from
Goalkeepers
1	Anas Zniti	(Morocco)	GK	28 October 1988 (aged 32)	(Morocco) AS FAR
82	Mohamed Bouamira	(Morocco)	GK	21 February 1988 (aged 33)	(Morocco) Chabab Rif Al Hoceima
12	Amir El Haddaoui	(Morocco)	GK	14 September 1999 (aged 21)	(Morocco) Youth system
Defenders
4	Soumaila Ouattara	(Burkina Faso)	CB	5 July 1995 (aged 26)	(Burkina Faso) Rahimo FC
8	Sanad Al Warfali	(Libya)	CB	17 May 1992 (aged 29)	(Libya) Al Ahli SC
20	Abdeljalil Jbira	(Morocco)	LB	14 March 1990 (aged 31)	(Morocco) Kawkab Marrakech
24	Marouane Hadhoudi	(Morocco)	CB	13 February 1992 (aged 29)	(Morocco) Difaâ Hassani El Jadidi
25	Omar Boutayeb	(Morocco)	RB	19 April 1994 (aged 27)	(Morocco) Youth system
26	Ilias Haddad	(Morocco)	CB	1 March 1989 (aged 32)	(Morocco) AS FAR
29	Abdelilah Madkour	(Morocco)	RB	11 June 2000 (aged 21)	(Morocco) Youth system
47	Oussama Soukhane	(Morocco)	LB	18 September 1999 (aged 21)	(Morocco) Youth system
48	Mohamed Souboul	(Morocco)	LB	17 November 2001 (aged 19)	(Morocco) Youth system
Midfielders
6	Fabrice Ngoma	(Democratic Republic of the Congo)	CM	22 January 1994 (aged 27)	(Democratic Republic of the Congo) AS Vita Club
8	Badr Boulahroud	(Morocco)	CM	21 April 1993 (aged 28)	(Spain) Málaga CF
16	Omar Arjoune	(Morocco)	DM	1 February 1996 (aged 25)	(Morocco) IR Tanger
18	Abdelilah Hafidi	(Morocco)	AM	30 January 1992 (aged 29)	(Morocco) Youth system
19	Mohamed Zrida	(Morocco)	DM	1 February 1999 (aged 22)	(Morocco) Youth system
23	Mohamed Al Makahasi	(Morocco)	CM	5 February 1995 (aged 26)	(Morocco) Moghreb Tétouan
55	Abderrahim Achchakir	(Morocco)	DM	15 December 1986 (aged 34)	(Morocco) AS FAR
98	Zakaria El Wardi	(Morocco)	CM	17 August 1998 (aged 23)	(Morocco) Moghreb Tétouan
Forwards
5	Mohsine Moutaouali	(Morocco)	AM / RW	3 March 1986 (aged 35)	(Qatar) Al Ahli SC
7	Noah Sadaoui	(Morocco)	LW	14 September 1993 (aged 27)	(Morocco) Mouloudia Oujda
9	Ben Malango	(Democratic Republic of the Congo)	ST	10 November 1993 (aged 27)	(Democratic Republic of the Congo) TP Mazembe
10	Mahmoud Benhalib	(Morocco)	LW	23 March 1996 (aged 25)	(Morocco) Youth system
14	Zakaria Habti	(Morocco)	RW	6 February 1998 (aged 23)	(Morocco) Youth system
21	Soufiane Rahimi	(Morocco)	LW	2 June 1996 (aged 25)	(Morocco) Youth system
30	Ayoub Nanah	(Morocco)	SS	12 November 1992 (aged 27)	(Morocco) Difaâ Hassani El Jadidi
N/A	Houssine Rahimi	(Morocco)	ST	4 February 2002 (aged 23)	(Morocco) Youth system

== Transfers ==
=== In ===
Date	Pos	Player	From club	Transfer fee	Source
9 September 2020	DF	(Morocco) Marouane Hadhoudi	(Qatar) Al Ahli SC	Free agent	
20 October 2020	FW	(Morocco) Noah Sadaoui	Mouloudia Oujda	Free agent	
22 October 2020	MF	(Morocco) Chadi Yakiri	(Spain) Deportivo de la Coruna	End of loan	
22 October 2020	DF	(Morocco) Imrane Fiddi	AS Salé	End of loan	
22 October 2020	DF	(Morocco) Saad Lakohal	Widad Temara	End of loan	
22 October 2020	DF	(Morocco) Abderrazak Ghazouat	JS Soualem	End of loan	
22 October 2020	FW	(Morocco) Hicham Islah	JS Soualem	End of loan	
5 February 2021	DF	(Burkina Faso) Soumaila Ouattara	(Burkina Faso) Rahimo FC	€50 k	
5 February 2021	MF	(Morocco) Badr Boulahroud	(Spain) Málaga CF	Free agent	
5 February 2021	FW	(Morocco) Youssef Gharb	(Spain) Siete Picos Colmenar	Undisclosed	

=== Out ===
Date	Pos	Player	To club	Transfer fee	Source
12 October 2020	FW	(Morocco) Hamid Ahaddad	(Egypt) Zamalek SC	End of loan	
9 November 2020	DF	(Morocco) Badr Benoun	(Egypt) Al Ahly SC	€1,7 million	
24 January 2021	DF	(Morocco) Mohamed Douik	RCA Zemamra	Loan	
24 January 2021	DF	(Morocco) Imrane Fiddi	Chabab Mohammédia	Loan	
26 January 2021	FW	(Morocco) Youssef Bekkari	RCA Zemamra	Undisclosed	
30 January 2021	FW	(Morocco) Anas Jabroun	Unattached	Released	
31 January 2021	DF	(Cameroon) Fabrice Ngah	(Egypt) Ceramica Cleopatra	Undisclosed	
5 February 2021	DF	(Morocco) Zakaria Drouich	Chabab Mohammédia	Undisclosed	

== Pre-season and friendlies ==
19 November 2020 Friendly	Raja CA	0–0	Etoile de Casablanca	Casablanca
12:00				Stadium: Raja-Oasis Sports Complex; Attendance: 0 (close doors)

21 November 2020 Friendly	Raja CA	1–0	Club Jeunesse Ben Guerir	Casablanca
12:00	Sadaoui 29'			Stadium: Raja-Oasis Sports Complex; Attendance: 0 (close doors)

22 November 2020 Friendly	Raja CA	0–1	Maghreb de Fès	Casablanca
12:00				Stadium: Raja-Oasis Sports Complex; Attendance: 0 (close doors)

25 November 2020 Friendly	Raja CA	0–0	Youssoufia Berrechid	Casablanca
12:00				Stadium: Raja-Oasis Sports Complex; Attendance: 0 (close doors)

26 November 2020 Friendly	Raja CA	2–1	Olympique Dcheira	Casablanca
12:00	Benhalib 20' 37'			Stadium: Raja-Oasis Sports Complex; Attendance: 0 (close doors)

28 November 2020 Friendly	Olympique Safi	0–1	Raja CA	Marrakesh
12:00			Sadaoui 54'	Stadium: Marrakesh Stadium; Attendance: 0 (close doors)

30 January 2021 Friendly	Raja CA	3–0	RC Oued Zem	Casablanca
11:00	Nanah 33' 41'; Gharb 88'			Stadium: Raja-Oasis Sports Complex; Attendance: 0 (close doors)

3 February 2021 Friendly	Raja CA	0–3	RCA Zemamra	Casablanca
11:00				Stadium: Raja-Oasis Sports Complex; Attendance: 0 (close doors)

== Competitions ==
=== Overview ===
Competition	First match	Last match	Starting round	Final position	Record							
Competition	First match	Last match	Starting round	Final position	Pld	W	D	L	GF	GA	GD	Win %
Botola	6 December 2020	28 July 2021	Matchday 1	2nd	30	17	8	5	48	26	+22	56.67
Throne Cup	1st January 2021	3 March 2021	Round of 32	Quarter-final	3	2	1	0	5	2	+3	66.67
CAF Champions League	22 December 2020	5 January 2021	First round	First round	2	0	2	0	0	0	+0	0.00
Confederation Cup	14 February 2021	10 July 2021	First round	Winners	13	9	3	1	21	3	+18	69.23
Arab Club Champions Cup	11 January 2021	21 August 2021	Semi-final	Winners	2	1	1	0	7	4	+3	50.00
Total					50	29	15	6	81	35	+46	58.00

Last updated: 21 August 2021
Source: Sofascore

=== Botola ===
==== League table ====
Pos	Team	Pld	W	D	L	GF	GA	GD	Pts	Qualification or relegation
1	Wydad AC (C)	30	20	7	3	58	26	+32	67	Qualification for Champions League
2	Raja CA	30	17	8	5	48	26	+22	59	Qualification for Champions League
3	AS FAR	30	14	9	7	39	29	+10	51	Qualification for Confederation Cup
4	RS Berkane	30	13	6	11	37	36	+1	45	Qualification for Confederation Cup
5	Mouloudia Oujda	30	12	6	12	38	35	+3	42	

Source: FRMF.ma
Rules for classification: 1) Points; 2a) Head-to-head goal difference if they are two teams with equal points; 2b) Goal difference if they are more than two teams with equal points; 3) Number of wins; 4) Goals scored; 5) Play-off between involved teams.
(C) Champions

==== Results summary ====
Overall								Home						Away					
Pld	W	D	L	GF	GA	GD	Pts	W	D	L	GF	GA	GD	W	D	L	GF	GA	GD
30	17	8	5	48	26	+22	59	10	2	3	25	11	+14	7	6	2	23	15	+8

Last updated: 28 July 2021.
Source: Competitive matches

==== Results by round ====
Round	1	2	3	4	5	6	7	8	9	10	11	12	13	14	15	16	17	18	19	20	21	22	23	24	25	26	27	28	29	30
Ground	A	H	H	A	H	A	H	A	H	A	H	A	H	A	H	H	A	A	H	A	H	A	H	A	H	A	H	A	H	A
Result	D	W	W	W	W	D	W	D	D	L	L	W	W	D	W	D	W	W	W	W	L	W	W	L	L	D	W	D	W	W
Position	2	7	5	2	1	1	2	2	2	2	2	2	2	2	2	2	2	2	2	2	2	2	2	2	2	2	2	2	2	2

Updated to match(es) played on 28 July 2021. Source: Competitive matches
A = Away; H = Home; W = Win; D = Draw; L = Loss

==== Matches ====
Date	Opponents	Venue	Result	Scorers	Report
6 December 2020	Fath US	A	3–3	Rahimi 38' (pen.), 48' Sadaoui 72'	Report
10 December 2020	RC Oued-Zem	H	3–2	Rahimi 23' Malango 35' (pen.) El Wardi 48'	Report
13 December 2020	MC Oujda	H	3–0	Benhalib 66' Malango 69' Abdoul Ba 74' (o.g.)	Report
19 December 2020	RS Berkane	A	1–0	Rahimi 65'	Report
26 December 2020	Chabab Mohammédia	H	1–0	Rahimi 32'	Report
17 February 2021	AS FAR	A	1–1	Malango 74'	Report
25 February 2021	Ittihad Tanger	H	2–0	Sadaoui 42' Malango 90'	Report
28 February 2021	Difaâ Hassani El Jadidi	A	0–0		Report
7 March 2021	Youssoufia Berrechid	H	1–1	Malango 73'	Report
21 March 2021	Wydad AC	A	0–2		Report
7 April 2021	Hassania Agadir	H	0–1		Report
16 April 2021	Moghreb Tétouan	A	3–2	Rahimi 45' Malango 50', 89'	Report
25 April 2021	Olympique Safi	H	2–0	Hafidi 4', 61'	Report
2 May 2021	RCA Zemamra	A	1–1	Al Warfali 56'	Report
9 May 2021	Maghreb AS	H	1–0	Hafidi 74'	Report
12 May 2021	Fath US	H	1–1	Rahimi 19'	Report
20 May 2021	MC Oujda	A	2–0	Malango 33' Ngoma 70'	Report
27 May 2021	SCC Mohammédia	A	2–1	Malango 49' Moutouali 90+8' (pen.)	Report
30 May 2021	AS FAR	H	3–2	Malango 32' Rahimi 53' Benhalib 89' (pen.)	Report
3 June 2021	RC Oued-Zem	A	2–0	Rahimi 50' (pen.) Haibour 70' (o.g.)	Report
13 June 2021	RS Berkane	H	0–1		Report
16 June 2021	Ittihad Tanger	A	3–0	Malango 17 56 Rahimi 39'	Report
24 June 2021	Difaâ Hassani El Jadidi	H	2–0	Malango 49' Rahimi 63'	Report
30 June 2021	Youssoufia Berrechid	A	0–1		Report
3 July 2021	Wydad AC	H	1–2	Rahimi 57' (pen.)	Report
6 July 2021	Hassania Agadir	A	0–0		Report
14 July 2021	Moghreb Tétouan	H	4–1	Malango 3' Farah 55' Hafidi 66' Rahimi 70'	Report
17 July 2021	Olympique Safi	A	2–2	Malango 38' Ngoma 89'	Report
23 July 2021	RCA Zemamra	H	1–0	Rahimi 23'	Report
28 July 2021	Maghreb AS	A	3–2	Amila 3' Ngoma 19' Moutouali 37'	Report

=== Throne Cup ===
1 January 2021 Round of 32	Raja CA	2–1 (a.e.t.)	Wydad Fès	Casablanca
19:30	Benhalib 5'; Malango 118'	Report	El Azizi 62' (pen.)	Stadium: Stade Mohammed V Attendance: 0 Referee: Mohamed Nhayeh

3 March 2021 Round of 16	Raja CA	2–0	US Sidi Kacem	Casablanca
17:00	Malango 38' (pen.); Benhalib 88'	Report		Stadium: Stade Mohammed V Attendance: 0 Referee: Soulaymane El Atifi

5 May 2021 Quarter-final	AS FAR	1–1	Raja CA	Rabat
20:00	Jerrari 71'	Report	Benhalib 53'	Stadium: Prince Moulay Abdellah Stadium; Attendance: 0 Referee: Abderrahim El Yaâcoubi

=== Champions League ===
==== First round ====
In the qualifying rounds, each tie will be played on a home-and-away two-legged basis. If the aggregate score will be tied after the second leg, the away goals rule was applied, and if still tied, extra time will not be played, and the penalty shoot-out will be used to determine the winner (Regulations III. 13 & 14).

22 December 2020 First leg	Teungueth (Senegal)	0–0	(Morocco) Raja CA	Thiès
17:00 UTC+0		Report		Stadium: Stade Lat-Dior; Referee: Boubou Traoré (Mali)

5 January 2021 Second leg	Raja CA (Morocco)	0–0 (1–3 p)	(Senegal) Teungueth	Casablanca
19:00 UTC+1		Report		Stadium: Stade Mohammed V Attendance: 0 Referee: Lahlou Benbraham (Algeria)
	Penalties
	Moutouali (penalty missed); Haddad (penalty missed); Sadaoui (penalty missed); El Wardi (penalty scored)		(penalty missed) Aboubakrine; (penalty scored) Ndoye; (penalty scored) Sarr; (penalty missed) B. Diop; (penalty scored) E. Diop

=== Confederation Cup ===
==== Play-off round ====
14 February 2021	Raja CA (Morocco)	1–0	(Tunisia) US Monastir	Stade Mohammed V, Casablanca
17:00 UTC+1	Benhalib 35'	Report		Referee: Daouda Gueye (Senegal)

21 February 2021	US Monastir (Tunisia)	1–0 (5–6 p)	(Morocco) Raja CA	Stade Mustapha Ben Jannet, Monastir
14:00 UTC+1	Jlassi 38'	Report		Referee: Mehdi Abid Charef (Algeria)
	Penalties
	Ben Romdhane (penalty missed); Chikhaoui (penalty scored); Mhirsi (penalty scored); Arfaoui (penalty scored); Jlassi (penalty scored); Tshibamba (penalty scored); Saghraoui (penalty missed)		(penalty scored) Rahimi; (penalty missed) Hafidi; (penalty scored) Al Warfali; (penalty scored) El Wardi; (penalty scored) Arjoune; (penalty scored) Madkour; (penalty scored) Malango

==== Group stage ====
Pos	Team	Pld	W	D	L	GF	GA	GD	Pts	Qualification	RCA	PYR	NKA	NAM
1	(Morocco) Raja CA	6	6	0	0	13	0	+13	18	Advance to knockout stage	—	2–0	2–0	1–0
2	(Egypt) Pyramids	6	4	0	2	7	5	+2	12	Advance to knockout stage	0–3	—	3–0	1–0
3	(Zambia) Nkana	6	2	0	4	2	8	−6	6		0–2	0–1	—	1–0
4	(Tanzania) Namungo	6	0	0	6	0	9	−9	0		0–3	0–2	0–1	—

Source: Soccerway

10 March 2021	Raja CA (Morocco)	1–0	(Tanzania) Namungo	Stade Mohammed V, Casablanca
16:00 (17:00 UTC+1)	Rahimi 54' (pen.)	Report		Referee: Hassan Corneh (Liberia)

17 March 2021	Nkana (Zambia)	0–2	(Morocco) Raja CA	Levy Mwanawasa Stadium, Ndola (Note: Nkana played their home matches at Levy Mwanawasa Stadium, Ndola, instead of their regular home stadium Nkana Stadium, Kitwe, due to unavailability.)
16:00 (18:00 UTC+2)		Report	Rahimi 47' (pen.); Sadaoui 87'	Referee: Ali Mohamed Adelaide (Comoros)

4 April 2021	Raja CA (Morocco)	2–0	(Egypt) Pyramids	Stade Mohammed V, Casablanca
16:00 (17:00 UTC+1)	Ekramy 15' (o.g.); Malango 21'	Report		Referee: Sekou Ahmed Touré (Guinea)

11 April 2021	Pyramids (Egypt)	0–3	(Morocco) Raja CA	30 June Stadium, Cairo
19:00 (21:00 UTC+2)		Report	Ngoma 15'; Malango 42'; Rahimi 77'	Referee: Helder Martins de Carvalho (Angola)

21 April 2021	Namungo (Tanzania)	0–3	(Morocco) Raja CA	National Stadium, Dar es Salaam
13:00 (16:00 UTC+3)		Report	Haddad 8'; Ngoma 14'; Habti 36'	Referee: Chelanget Sabila (Uganda)

28 April 2021	Raja CA (Morocco)	2–0	(Zambia) Nkana	Stade Mohammed V, Casablanca
21:00 (22:00 UTC+1)	Idbouiguiguine 18'; Sadaoui 42'	Report		Referee: Sabri Mohamed Fadul (Sudan)

==== Knockout phase ====
===== Quarter-finals =====
16 May 2021 First leg	Orlando Pirates (South Africa)	1–1	(Morocco) Raja CA	Orlando Stadium, Johannesburg
13:00 (15:00 UTC+2)	Pule 39'	Report	Malango 60'	Referee: Peter Waweru (Kenya)

23 May 2021 Second leg	Raja CA (Morocco)	4–0	(South Africa) Orlando Pirates	Stade Mohammed V, Casablanca
16:00 (17:00 UTC+1)	Malango 6', 36'; El Wardi 22'; Rahimi 31'	Report		Referee: Mustapha Ghorbal (Algeria)

===== Semi-finals =====
20 June 2021 First leg	Pyramids (Egypt)	0–0	(Morocco) Raja CA	30 June Stadium, Cairo
19:00 (21:00 UTC+2)		Report		Referee: Pacifique Ndabihawenimana (Burundi)

27 June 2021 Second leg	Raja CA (Morocco)	0–0 (5–4 p)	(Egypt) Pyramids	Stade Mohammed V, Casablanca
19:00 (20:00 UTC+1)		Report		Referee: Janny Sikazwe (Zambia)
	Penalties
	Rahimi (penalty scored); Malango (penalty missed); Al Warfali (penalty missed); El Wardi (penalty scored); Benhalib (penalty scored); Zrida (penalty scored); Ngoma (penalty missed); Madkour (penalty scored)		(penalty scored) El Said; (penalty missed) Ramadan; (penalty scored) Wadi; (penalty scored) Samy; (penalty missed) Farouk; (penalty scored) Galal; (penalty missed) Tawfik; (penalty missed) Hamdy

===== Final =====
10 July 2021 Final	Raja CA (Morocco)	2–1	(Algeria) JS Kabylie	Stade de l'Amitié, Cotonou
19:00 GMT (20:00 UTC+1)	Rahimi 5'; Malango 14'	Report	Zaka 46'	Referee: Victor Gomes (South Africa)

Raja CA	JS Kabylie

GK	1	(Morocco) Anas Zniti (c)
CB	24	(Morocco) Marouane Hadhoudi
CB	15	(Netherlands) Ilias Haddad
RB	29	(Morocco) Abdelilah Madkour	(yellow card) 90+4'
LB	27	(Morocco) Oussama Soukhane
CM	16	(Morocco) Omar Arjoune	(red card) 63'
CM	17	(Morocco) Zakaria El Wardi
RW	10	(Morocco) Mahmoud Benhalib		(substituted off) 58'
AM	18	(Morocco) Abdelilah Hafidi		(substituted off) 71'
LW	21	(Morocco) Soufiane Rahimi		(substituted off) 90+1'
CF	28	(Democratic Republic of the Congo) Ben Malango		(substituted off) 90+1'
Substitutes:
GK	22	(Morocco) Mohamed Bouamira
DF	3	(Morocco) Mohamed Souboul
DF	20	(Morocco) Abdeljalil Jbira
MF	6	(Democratic Republic of the Congo) Fabrice Ngoma		(substituted on) 71'
MF	19	(Morocco) Mohamed Zrida		(substituted on) 58'
MF	23	(Morocco) Mohamed Al Makaazi		(substituted on) 90+1'
MF	26	(Morocco) Riad Idbouiguiguine
FW	14	(Morocco) Zakaria Habti
FW	30	(Morocco) Ayoub Nanah		(substituted on) 90+1'
Manager:
(Tunisia) Lassaad Chabbi

GK	25	(Algeria) Oussama Benbot
CB	31	(Algeria) Ahmed Kerroum	(yellow card) 84'
CB	2	(Algeria) Ahmed Ait Abdessalem
CB	5	(Algeria) Badreddine Souyad
RM	22	(Algeria) Walid Bencherifa
CM	13	(Algeria) Aziz Benabdi
CM	8	(Algeria) Juba Oukaci		(substituted off) 69'
LM	21	(Algeria) Malik Raiah		(substituted off) 46'
AM	7	(Algeria) Mohamed Benchaira
CF	17	(Algeria) Rédha Bensayah (c)	(yellow card) 34'	(substituted off) 76'
CF	9	(Algeria) Zaka		(substituted off) 76'
Substitutes:
GK	1	(Algeria) Mohamed Idir Hadid
DF	3	(Algeria) Abdelmoumen Chikhi
DF	4	(Algeria) Bilal Tizi Bouali
DF	37	(Algeria) Fares Djabri
MF	6	(Algeria) Ammar El Orfi
MF	14	(Libya) Abdussalam Tubal		(substituted on) 76'
MF	38	(Algeria) Kouceila Boualia		(substituted on) 69'
FW	11	(Algeria) Rezki Hamroune		(substituted on) 46'
FW	34	(Algeria) Massinissa Nezla		(substituted on) 76'
Manager:
(France) Denis Lavagne

Man of the Match:
Soufiane Rahimi
(Raja CA)

=== Arab Club Champions Cup ===
==== Semi-final ====
The tournament was postponed in 2020 due to COVID-19 pandemic, thus Raja CA played the semi-final's second leg against Ismaily in January 2021 in Marrakesh, eleven months after the first leg in Egypt.

11 January 2021 Second leg	Raja CA (Morocco)	3–0	(Egypt) Ismaily	Marrakesh
19:00 UTC+1	Moutouali 60' (pen.); Malango 67'; Benhalib 86'	Report		Stadium: Marrakesh Stadium; Attendance: 0 Referee: Mohanad Qasim Sarray (Iraq)

==== Final ====
21 August 2021 Final	Al-Ittihad Jeddah (Saudi Arabia)	4–4 (3–4 p)	(Morocco) Raja CA	Rabat
21:00 WAT (UTC+1)	Bruno Henrique 4'; Romarinho 28' (pen.), 53', 64' (pen.)	Report	Haddad 5'; Benhalib 13'; El Wardi 37'; S. Rahimi 50'	Stadium: Prince Moulay Abdellah Stadium; Attendance: 0 (closed doors); Referee: Mahmoud El Banna (Egypt)
	Penalties
	Bruno Henrique (penalty missed); Romarinho (penalty scored); Coronado (penalty scored); Al-Muwallad (penalty missed); Al-Malki (penalty scored)		(penalty scored) S. Rahimi; (penalty scored) Zrida; (penalty missed) Madkour; (penalty scored) Hafidi; (penalty scored) Arjoune

Al-Ittihad	Raja CA

GK	45	(Brazil) Marcelo Grohe
RB	66	(Saudi Arabia) Saud Abdulhamid	(yellow card) 41'
CB	44	(Saudi Arabia) Omar Hawsawi	(yellow card) 49'
CB	27	(Saudi Arabia) Hamdan Al-Shamrani
LB	29	(Saudi Arabia) Muhannad Al-Shanqeeti
CM	20	(Morocco) Karim El Ahmadi (c)	(yellow card) 66'	(substituted off) 72'
CM	43	(Brazil) Bruno Henrique
RW	8	(Saudi Arabia) Fahad Al-Muwallad
AM	75	(Brazil) Igor Coronado
LW	77	(Saudi Arabia) Abdulaziz Al-Bishi		(substituted off) 79'
CF	90	(Brazil) Romarinho
Substitutes:
GK	1	(Saudi Arabia) Rakan Al-Najjar
DF	21	(Saudi Arabia) Abdulmohsen Fallatah
DF	32	(Saudi Arabia) Hazim Al-Zahrani
MF	16	(Saudi Arabia) Abdulaziz Al-Jebreen
MF	23	(Saudi Arabia) Abdulrahman Al-Aboud		(substituted on) 79'
MF	88	(Saudi Arabia) Abdulellah Al-Malki		(substituted on) 72'
FW	70	(Saudi Arabia) Haroune Camara
Manager:
(Brazil) Fábio Carille

GK	1	(Morocco) Anas Zniti	(yellow card) 27'
RB	29	(Morocco) Abdelilah Madkour
CB	34	(Morocco) Marouane Hadhoudi
CB	26	(Netherlands) Ilias Haddad	(yellow card) 85'
LB	27	(Morocco) Oussama Soukhane
CM	16	(Morocco) Omar Arjoune
CM	8	(Morocco) Zakaria El Wardi	(yellow card) 55'	(substituted off) 75'
RW	5	(Morocco) Mouhcine Moutouali (c)		(substituted off) 63'
AM	18	(Morocco) Abdelilah Hafidi	(yellow card) 18'
LW	21	(Morocco) Soufiane Rahimi	(yellow card) 51'
CF	10	(Morocco) Mahmoud Benhalib		(substituted off) 76'
Substitutes:
GK	12	(Morocco) Amir El Haddaoui
DF	20	(Morocco) Abdeljalil Jbira
DF	37	(Morocco) Mohammed Naim
MF	6	(Democratic Republic of the Congo) Fabrice Ngoma
MF	14	(Morocco) Zakaria Habti		(substituted on) 76'
MF	19	(Morocco) Mohamed Zrida		(substituted on) 75'
FW	9	(Guinea) Moustapha Kouyaté		(substituted on) 63'
Manager:
(Tunisia) Lassaad Chabbi

== Squad information ==
=== Goals ===
Includes all competitive matches. The list is sorted alphabetically by surname when total goals are equal.

Rank	Pos.	Player	Botola	Throne Cup	Champions League	Confederation Cup	Arab Club Champions Cup	Total
1	FW	(Democratic Republic of the Congo) Ben Malango	16	2	0	6	1	25
2	FW	(Morocco) Soufiane Rahimi	14	0	0	5	1	20
3	FW	(Morocco) Mahmoud Benhalib	2	3	0	1	2	8
4	MF	(Democratic Republic of the Congo) Fabrice Ngoma	3	0	0	2	0	5
5	FW	(Morocco) Noah Sadaoui	2	0	0	2	0	4
6	AM	(Morocco) Abdelilah Hafidi	4	0	0	0	0	4
7	FW	(Morocco) Mohsine Moutaouali	2	0	0	0	1	3
8	MF	(Morocco) Zakaria El Wardi	0	0	0	1	1	2
9	DF	(Morocco) Ilias Haddad	0	0	0	1	1	2
10	FW	(Morocco) Zakaria Habti	0	0	0	1	0	1
11	DF	(Libya) Sanad Al Warfali	1	0	0	0	0	1
12	AM	(Morocco) Riad Idbouiguiguine	0	0	0	1	0	1
13	FW	(Morocco) Abdellah Farah	1	0	0	0	0	1
14	FW	(Morocco) Salaheddine Amila	1	0	0	0	0	1
Own goals			2	0	0	1	0	3
Total			48	5	0	21	7	81

=== Assists ===
Rank	Pos.	Player	Botola	Throne Cup	Champions League	Confederation Cup	Arab Club Champions Cup	Total
1	FW	(Morocco) Soufiane Rahimi	11	2	0	3	1	17
2	AM	(Morocco) Abdelilah Hafidi	9	0	0	1	2	12
3	FW	(Democratic Republic of the Congo) Ben Malango	3	0	0	1	0	4
4	FW	(Morocco) Zakaria Habti	2	1	0	1	0	4
5	MF	(Morocco) Omar Arjoune	1	0	0	3	0	4
6	DF	(Morocco) Abdelilah Madkour	2	0	0	1	1	4
7	FW	(Morocco) Mahmoud Benhalib	3	0	0	0	0	3
8	DF	(Morocco) Abdeljalil Jbira	3	0	0	0	0	3
9	FW	(Morocco) Ayoub Nanah	0	0	0	2	0	2
10	MF	(Morocco) Mohamed Zrida	1	0	0	1	0	2
11	DF	(Morocco) Oussama Soukhane	1	0	0	1	0	2
12	AM	(Morocco) Mohsine Moutaouali	1	0	0	1	0	2
13	MF	(Morocco) Zakaria El Wardi	1	0	0	0	0	1
14	MF	(Morocco) Mohamed Makahasi	0	1	0	0	0	1
15	DF	(Morocco) Marouane Hadhoudi	0	0	0	1	0	1
16	DF	(Morocco) Mohamed Naim	1	0	0	0	0	1
			39	4	0	16	4	63

== Club awards ==
=== End-of-season awards ===
- Eagle of the Season: Anas Zniti

=== Eagle of the Month award ===
Awarded monthly to the player that was chosen by fans.

Month	Player	Ref.
December	Soufiane Rahimi	
January	Not awarded	
February	Zakaria El Wardi	
March	Not awarded	
April	Ben Malango	
May	Marouane Hadhoudi	
June	Anas Zniti	
July	Anas Zniti	
