= 2022–23 Raja CA season =

Raja CA
2022–23 season
- President: Aziz El Badraoui (until 26 May 2023); Mohamed Boudrika (from 26 May 2023)
- Manager: Faouzi Benzarti (until 21 September 2022); Mondher Kebaier (until 7 June 2023); Josef Zinnbauer (from 8 June 2023)
- Stadium: Stade Mohammed V
- Botola: 5th
- Throne Cup: Final
- Champions League: Quarter-finals
- Top goalscorer: Hamza Khabba (8)
- Biggest win: 5-0 vs Vipers SC, Champions League, 10 February 2023
- Biggest defeat: 3–1 vs OC Safi, Botola, 28 January 2023
Home colours	Away colours	Third colours

The 2022–23 season is Raja Club Athletic's 74th season in existence and the club's 66th consecutive season in the top flight of Moroccan football. In addition to the domestic league, they are also participating in this season's editions of the Throne Cup and Champions League.

Raja CA kicked off the season with a 2–2 draw against Olympique Safi in the first round of Botola.

== Players ==
=== First-team squad ===
Players and squad numbers last updated on 30 January 2023.
Note: Flags indicate national team as has been defined under FIFA eligibility rules. Players may hold more than one non-FIFA nationality.

No.	Name	Nat.	Position	Date of Birth (Age)	Signed from
Goalkeepers
1	Anas Zniti	(Morocco)	GK	28 October 1988 (aged 34)	(Morocco) AS FAR
89	Marouane Fakhr	(Morocco)	GK	11 February 1989 (aged 33)	(Morocco) Mouloudia Oujda
22	Amir El Haddaoui	(Morocco)	GK	14 September 1999 (aged 23)	(Morocco) Youth system
Defenders
24	Marouane Hadhoudi	(Morocco)	CB	13 February 1992 (aged 30)	(Morocco) Difaâ El Jadidi
15	Jamal Harkass	(Morocco)	CB	24 November 1995 (aged 27)	(Morocco) Mouloudia Oujda
4	Ismael Mokadem	(Morocco)	CB	26 July 1995 (aged 27)	(Morocco) Renaissance Berkane
33	Bouchaib Arrassi	(Morocco)	CB	6 January 2000 (aged 22)	(Morocco) SCC Mohammedia
16	Mohamed Nahiri	(Morocco)	LB	22 October 1991 (aged 31)	Unattached
3	Mahmoud Bentayg	(Morocco)	LB	30 October 1999 (aged 23)	(Morocco) TAS de Casablanca
6	Zakaria Labib	(Morocco)	LB	1 January 2003 (aged 20)	(Morocco) Youth system
29	Abdelilah Madkour	(Morocco)	RB	11 June 2000 (aged 22)	(Morocco) Youth system
27	Mohamed Boulacsoute	(Morocco)	RB	23 September 1998 (aged 24)	(Morocco) Chabab Mohammédia
25	Abdessamad Badaoui	(Morocco)	RB	24 August 1999 (aged 23)	(Morocco) JS Soualem
Midfielders
18	Roger Aholou	(Togo)	DM	30 December 1993 (aged 29)	(Tunisia) US Monastir
5	Ahmadou Camara	(Guinea)	DM	1 August 2003 (aged 20)	(Morocco) Youth system
28	Youssef Riani	(Morocco)	DM	8 May 1998 (aged 24)	(Morocco) TAS de Casablanca
8	Walid Sabbar	(Morocco)	DM	25 February 1996 (aged 26)	(United Arab Emirates) Emirates Club
19	Mohamed Zrida	(Morocco)	DM	1 February 1999 (aged 23)	(Morocco) Youth system
20	Raouf Benguit	(Algeria)	CM	5 April 1996 (aged 26)	(Algeria) MC Alger
13	Hamza Moujahid	(Morocco)	CM	1 February 1995 (aged 27)	(Morocco) AS FAR
10	Zakaria El Wardi	(Morocco)	CM	17 August 1998 (aged 24)	(Egypt) Zamalek SC
23	Mohamed Al Makahasi	(Morocco)	CM	5 February 1995 (aged 27)	(Morocco) Moghreb Tétouan
81	Abdelilah Hafidi	(Morocco)	AM	30 January 1992 (aged 30)	(Saudi Arabia) Al-Hazem
Forwards
11	Nawfel Zerhouni	(Morocco)	RW	25 September 1995 (aged 27)	(Saudi Arabia) Al-Hazem
7	Zakaria Hadraf	(Morocco)	LW	18 June 1990 (aged 32)	(Morocco) Difaâ El Jadidi
26	Yousri Bouzok	(Algeria)	RW	18 August 1996 (aged 26)	(Algeria) Paradou AC
14	Zakaria Habti	(Morocco)	RW	6 February 1998 (aged 24)	(Morocco) Youth system
2	Soufiane Benjdida	(Morocco)	ST	5 September 2001 (aged 21)	(Morocco) Youth system
17	Hamza Khabba	(Morocco)	ST	9 June 1996 (aged 26)	(Morocco) Olympic Safi
21	Houssine Rahimi	(Morocco)	ST	4 February 2002 (aged 20)	(Morocco) Youth system

=== New contracts ===
Date	Position	No.	Player	Ref.
1st August 2022	MF	23	(Morocco) Mohamed Al Makahasi	
27 August 2022	GK	1	(Morocco) Anas Zniti	
2 February 2023	FW	9	(Morocco) Soufiane Benjdida	

== Transfers ==
=== In ===
Date	Pos '	Player	From club	Transfer fee	Source
31 July 2022	DF	(Morocco) Ismael Mokadem	Renaissance Berkane	Free transfer	
31 July 2022	MF	(Morocco) Said Azeroual	AS Salé	Undisclosed	
31 July 2022	DF	(Morocco) Mohamed Boulacsoute	Chabab Mohammédia	Free transfer	
31 July 2022	FW	(Morocco) Zakaria Hadraf	Difaâ El Jadidi	Undisclosed	
1 August 2022	DF	(Morocco) Mahmoud Bentayg	TAS de Casablanca	66 K €	
1 August 2022	MF	(Morocco) Hamza Moujahid	AS FAR	Free transfer	
1 August 2022	FW	(Algeria) Yousri Bouzok	(Algeria) Paradou AC	Free transfer	
1 August 2022	FW	(Algeria) Mehdi Boukassi	(Iraq) Al-Quwa Al-Jawiya	Free transfer	
1 August 2022	MF	(Morocco) Abdelhay El Forsy	Chabab Atlas Khénifra	Free transfer	
2 August 2022	MF	(Morocco) Walid Sabbar	(United Arab Emirates) Emirates Club	Free transfer	
4 August 2022	MF	(Algeria) Raouf Benguit	(Algeria) MC Alger	Undisclosed	
27 August 2022	MF	(Togo) Roger Aholou	(Ivory Coast) FC San Pedro	47 K €	
31 August 2022	MF	(Morocco) Youssef Riani	TAS de Casablanca	Free Transfer	
31 August 2022	FW	(Gabon) Axel Méyé	Ittihad Tanger	332 K €	
31 August 2022	FW	(Morocco) Hamza Khabba	Al-Arabi SC (Kuwait)	121 K € (loan with purchase option)	
16 January 2023	MF	(Morocco) Zakaria El Wardi	(Egypt) Zamalek SC	Free transfer	
23 January 2023	FW	(Morocco) Nawfel Zerhouni	(Saudi Arabia) Al-Hazem F.C.	Loan	
29 January 2023	MF	(Morocco) Abdelilah Hafidi	(Saudi Arabia) Al-Hazem F.C.	Free transfer	
31 January 2023	DF	(Morocco) Mohamed Ali Manali	Moghreb Tetouan	Transfer	

=== Out ===
Date	Pos '	Player	From club	Transfer fee	Source
15 July 2022	DF	(Morocco) Ilias Haddad	Union de Touarga	Free transfer	
31 July 2022	MF	(Morocco) Omar Arjoune	(Saudi Arabia) Al-Faisaly	Free transfer	
8 August 2022	MF	(Democratic Republic of the Congo) Fabrice Ngoma	(Kuwait) Al-Fahaheel FC	Free transfer	
31 August 2022	MF	(Morocco) Zakaria El Wardi	(Egypt) Zamalek SC	Free transfer	
31 August 2022	FW	(Morocco) Hamid Ahaddad	Wydad AC	Free transfer	
31 August 2022	MF	(Morocco) Badr Boulahroud	(Saudi Arabia) Ohod Club	Free transfer	
31 August 2022	MF	(Morocco) Youness Mokhtar	(Indonesia) Bhayangkara F.C.	Free transfer	
31 August 2022	FW	(Liberia) Peter Wilson	(Norway) FK Jerv	Free transfer	
31 August 2022	MF	(Morocco) Mohsine Moutouali	(Libya) Al Ahli SC (Tripoli)	Free transfer	
31 August 2022	MF	(Algeria) Mehdi Boukassi	(Libya) Al-Nasr SC (Benghazi)	Loan	
31 August 2022	DF	(Morocco) Mohamed Souboul	Ittihad Tanger	Loan	
31 August 2022	DF	(Morocco) Oussama Soukhane	Difaâ El Jadida	Loan	
31 August 2022	FW	(Morocco) Abdellah Farah	Difaâ El Jadida	Loan	
28 January 2023	FW	(Gabon) Axel Méyé	OC Safi	Loan	
31 January 2023	GK	(Algeria) Gaya Merbah	IR Tanger	Loan	
31 January 2023	MF	(Morocco) Abdelhay El Forsy	OC Safi	Loan	
31 January 2023	FW	(Morocco) Haitam El Bahja	Fath US	Free transfer	

== Competitions ==
=== Overview ===
Competition	Record								Started round	Final position / round	First match	Last match
Competition	G	W	D	L	GF	GA	GD	Win %	Started round	Final position / round	First match	Last match
Botola	30	11	11	8	31	26	+5	36.67	—N/a	5th place	4 September 2022	23 June 2023
Throne Cup	5	3	1	1	4	2	+2	60.00	Round of 32	Runners-up	15 March 2023	15 July 2023
Champions League	9	7	1	1	20	5	+15	77.78	Second round	Quarter-final	8 October 2022	29 April 2023
Total	44	21	13	10	55	33	+22	47.73				

Updated to match played 16 July 2023
Source: Competitions

=== Botola ===
==== League table ====
Pos	Team	Pld	W	D	L	GF	GA	GD	Pts	Qualification or relegation
3	Fath Union Sport	30	15	10	5	36	16	+20	55	Qualification for Confederation Cup
4	Olympic Club de Safi	30	12	11	7	34	28	+6	47	
5	Raja CA	30	11	11	8	31	26	+5	44 (Note: Head-to-head: Raja CA: 6 points, RS Berkane: 0 point.)	
6	RS Berkane	30	11	11	8	31	29	+2	44	Qualification for Confederation Cup (Note: RS Berkane qualified for the CAF Confederation Cup by winning the 2021–22 Moroccan Throne Cup.)
7	Hassania Agadir	30	10	9	11	30	29	+1	39	

Updated to match(es) played on 23 June 2023. Source: FRMF.ma
Rules for classification: 1) Points; 2a) Head-to-head goal difference if they are two teams with equal points; 2b) Goal difference if they are more than two teams with equal points; 3) Number of wins; 4) Goals scored; 5) Play-off between involved teams.

==== Results summary ====
Overall								Home						Away					
Pld	W	D	L	GF	GA	GD	Pts	W	D	L	GF	GA	GD	W	D	L	GF	GA	GD
30	11	11	8	31	26	+5	44	9	5	1	21	11	+10	2	6	7	10	15	−5

Last updated: 26 June 2023.
Source: Competitive matches

==== Results by round ====
Round	1	2	3	4	5	6	7	8	9	10	11	12	13	14	15	16	17	18	19	20	21	22	23	24	25	26	27	28	29	30
Ground	H	A	H	A	H	A	H	A	H	A	H	A	H	H	A	A	H	A	H	A	H	A	H	A	H	A	H	A	A	H
Result	D	L	D	D	W	L	W	W	D	D	W	W	W	W	D	L	W	L	W	L	D	L	D	L	L	D	W	D	D	W
Position	5	12	11	11	10	11	8	4	6	6	5	4	4	3	3	4	4	4	4	4	4	5	5	5	5	6	5	5	5	5

Updated to match(es) played on 26 June 2023. Source: Competitive matches
A = Away; H = Home; W = Win; D = Draw; L = Loss

==== Matches ====
4 September 2022 Round 1	Raja CA	2–2	Olympic Safi	Casablanca
20:30	Nahiri 33' (pen.); Harkass 47'	Report	Najjari 8'; Diarra 21'	Stadium: Stade Mohammed V Attendance: 40000; Referee: Mohamed Zerzay

9 September 2022 Round 2	Union de Touarga	1–0	Raja CA	Rabat
18:00	El Khalej 16'	Report		Stadium: Stade Moulay Hassan; Attendance: 8000; Referee: Redouane Jiyed

18 September 2022 Round 3	Raja CA	1–1	Moghreb Tétouan	Casablanca
17:00	Habti 34'	Report	Kamal 55'	Stadium: Stade Mohammed V Attendance: 40000; Referee: Nabil Berkia

30 September 2022 Round 4	SCC Mohammédia	0–0	Raja CA	Mohammedia
20:30		Report		Stadium: Stade El Bachir; Attendance: 10000; Referee: Karim Sabri

19 October 2022 Round 5	Raja CA	1–0	Hassania Agadir	Casablanca
20:30	Nahiri 97' (pen.)	Report		Stadium: Stade Mohammed V Attendance: 40000; Referee: Yassine Bouslim

23 October 2022 Round 6	Wydad AC	2–1	Raja CA	Casablanca
16:00	El Hassouni 56'; Zola 80'	Report	Nahiri 90' (pen.)	Stadium: Stade Mohammed V Attendance: 45000; Referee: Samir Guezzaz

29 October 2022 Round 7	Raja CA	1–0	FUS Rabat	Casablanca
16:00	El Bassil 2' (o.g.)	Report		Stadium: Stade Mohammed V Attendance: 30000; Referee: Hamza El Fareq

5 November 2022 Round 8	JS Soualem	1–4	Raja CA	Mohammédia
16:00	Nahiri 25' (pen.); Zrida 39'; Hadraf 59'; Benjdida 90'	Report	Sillah 14'	Stadium: Stade El Bachir; Attendance: 12000; Referee: Hicham Tamsamani

Mid-season break for 2022 FIFA World Cup

27 December 2022 Round 9	Raja CA	0–0	Maghreb de Fès	Casablanca
18:30		Report		Stadium: Stade Mohammed V Attendance: 35000; Referee: Nabil Benrkia

3 January 2023 Round 10	Olympique Club de Khouribga	0–0	Raja CA	Khouribga
20:30		Report		Stadium: Complexe OCP; Attendance: 15000; Referee: Hicham Tamsamani

6 January 2023 Round 11	Raja CA	3–0	IR Tanger	Casablanca
20:30	Khabba 28', 54'; Harkass 44'	Report		Stadium: Stade Mohammed V Attendance: 40000; Referee: Adil Zourak

14 January 2023 Round 12	RS Berkane	0–2	Raja CA	Berkane
16:00		Report	Zrida 83'; Bentayg 90'	Stadium: Stade Municipal de Berkane; Attendance: 5000; Referee: Daki Reddad

17 January 2023 Round 13	Raja CA	2–1	MC Oujda	Casablanca
18:15	Harkass 62'; Bouzok 69'	Report		Stadium: Stade Mohammed V Attendance: 45000; Referee: Jamal Belbasri

21 January 2023 Round 14	Raja CA	1–0	FAR Rabat	Casablanca
16:00	Habti 49'	Report		Stadium: Stade Mohammed V Attendance: 45000; Referee: Redouane Jiyed

24 January 2023 Round 15	Difaâ Hassani El Jadidi	0–0	Raja CA	El Jadida
20:30		Report		Stadium: Stade El Abdi; Attendance: 10000; Referee: Adil Zourak

28 January 2023 Round 16	OC Safi	3–1	Raja CA	Safi
18:15	Mehri 40'; El Morabit 92'; Amri 90+10' (pen.)	Report	Kordani 35' (o.g.)	Stadium: Stade El Massira; Attendance: 10000; Referee: Hamza El Fareq

22 February 2023 Round 17	Raja CA	2–1	Union de Touarga	Casablanca
20:30	Hadhoudi 66'; Bouzok 90+10' (pen.)	Report	Zouhzouh 45+14' (pen.)	Stadium: Stade Mohammed V Attendance: 35000; Referee: Adil Zourak

28 February 2023 Round 18	Moghreb Tétouan	1–0	Raja CA	Tétouan
18:15	El Hasnaoui 52'	Report		Stadium: Stade Saniat Rmel; Attendance: 10000

4 March 2023 Round 19	Raja CA	1–0	SCC Mohammédia	Casablanca
18:15	Zerhouni 51'	Report		Stadium: Stade Mohammed V Attendance: 40000; Referee: Samir Guezzaz

11 March 2023 Round 20	Hassania Agadir	2–1	Raja CA	Agadir
20:30	Kaidi 37'; Mehri 90+7'	Report	Aholou 69'	Stadium: Stade Adrar; Attendance: 25000; Referee: Daki Reddad

5 April 2023 Round 21	Raja CA	2–2	Wydad AC	Casablanca
22:00	Bouzok 39' (pen.); Boulacouste 67'	Report	Zola 45+5'; El Hassouni 90+13' (pen.)	Stadium: Stade Mohammed V Attendance: 25000; Referee: Redouane Jiyed

8 April 2023 Round 22	FUS Rabat	3–0	Raja CA	Rabat
22:00	Elaz 23', 39'; Karnass 29'	Report		Stadium: Stade Moulay Hassan; Attendance: 5000; Referee: Adil Zourak

15 April 2023 Round 23	Raja CA	0–0	JS Soualem	Casablanca
22:00		Report		Stadium: Stade Mohammed V Attendance: 25000; Referee: Youssef Treiki

3 May 2023 Round 24	Maghreb de Fès	2–1	Raja CA	Fez
21:30	El Ouadghiri 40'; Riahi 67'	Report	Benjdida 88'	Stadium: Fez Stadium; Attendance: 10000; Referee: Mohamed Lahouidri

6 May 2023 Round 25	Raja CA	0–1	OC Khouribga	Casablanca
17:00		Report	Kassou 88'	Stadium: Stade Mohammed V Attendance: 5000; Referee: Mohamed El Baroudi

21 May 2023 Round 26	IR Tanger	0–0	Raja CA	Tangier
19:00				Stadium: Stade Ibn Batouta; Attendance: 40000; Referee: Samir Guezzaz

14 June 2023 Round 27	Raja CA	2–1	RS Berkane	Casablanca
20:00	Zerhouni 15'; Zrida 58'	Report	Muzungu 52'	Stadium: Stade Mohammed V Attendance: 25000; Referee: Abderrahim Arrakhiz

17 June 2023 Round 28	MC Oujda	0–0	Raja CA	Oujda
20:00		Report		Stadium: Honneur Stadium; Attendance: 10000; Referee: Mohamed Bellote

20 June 2023 Round 29	FAR Rabat	0–0	Raja CA	Rabat
20:00		Report		Stadium: Prince Moulay Abdellah Stadium; Attendance: 45000; Referee: Hamza Fareq

23 June 2023 Round 30	Raja CA	3–2	Difaâ Hassani El Jadidi	Casablanca
20:00	Bentayg 61'; Arrassi 71'; Benjdida 78'	Report	Ferras 88' (pen.); Aberkille 90+3'	Stadium: Stade Mohammed V Attendance: 25000; Referee: Hanafi Saadi

=== Throne Cup ===
15 March 2023 Round of 32	Youssoufia Berrechid	0–1	Raja CA	Berrechid
15:00		Report	Sabbar 43' (pen.)	Stadium: Stade Municipal de Berrechid; Attendance: 10000; Referee: Mohamed Nhayeh

12 April 2023 Round of 16	Hassania Agadir	0–0 (a.e.t.) (3–5 p)	Raja CA	Agadir
22:00		Report		Stadium: Stade Adrar; Attendance: 0 Referee: Yassine Bouslim
	Penalties
	Ech-Chamakh (penalty scored); Afsal (penalty scored); Lakhdar (penalty missed); Boukhanfer (penalty scored)		(penalty scored) Hafidi; (penalty scored) Boulacsoute; (penalty scored) Harkass; (penalty scored) Habti; (penalty scored) Benjdida

14 May 2023 Quarter final	SCC Mohammédia	1–2 (a.e.t.)	Raja CA	Mohammedia
18:00	Assal 1'	Report	Khabba 68'; Zrida 95'	Stadium: Stade El Bachir; Attendance: 5000; Referee: Karim Sabri

9 July 2023 Semi-final	Wydad AC	0–1	Raja CA	Casablanca
17:00		Report	Zola 18' (o.g.)	Stadium: Stade Mohammed V

15 July 2023 Final	RS Berkane	1–0 (a.e.t.)	Raja CA	Rabat
20:00 UTC+1	Dayo 105' (pen.)	Report		Stadium: Prince Moulay Abdellah Stadium; Attendance: 45000; Referee: Yassine Bouslim

=== CAF Champions League ===
==== Qualifying rounds ====
The draw of the qualifying rounds was held on 9 August 2022.

===== Second round =====
8 October 2022 First leg	ASN Nigelec (Niger)	0–2	(Morocco) Raja CA	Niamey
16:30 UTC+1		Report	Habti 66'; Benjdida 90'	Stadium: Stade Général Seyni Kountché; Referee: Gnama Aklesso (Togo)

15 October 2022 Second leg	Raja CA (Morocco)	1–0 (3–0 agg.)	(Niger) ASN Nigelec	Casablanca
18:00 UTC+1	Nahiri 79'	Report		Stadium: Mohammed V Stadium; Referee: Mashood Ssali (Uganda)

==== Group stage ====
The draw of the group stage was held on 12 December 2022.

Group C

Pos	Team	Pld	W	D	L	GF	GA	GD	Pts	Qualification	RCA	SSC	HAC	VSC
1	(Morocco) Raja CA	6	5	1	0	17	3	+14	16	Advance to knockout stage	—	3–1	2–0	5–0
2	(Tanzania) Simba	6	3	0	3	10	7	+3	9	Advance to knockout stage	0–3	—	7–0	1–0
3	(Guinea) Horoya	6	2	1	3	4	12	−8	7		1–3	1–0	—	2–0
4	(Uganda) Vipers	6	0	2	4	1	10	−9	2		1–1	0–1	0–0	—

Source: CAF

10 February 2023 Matchday 1	Raja CA (Morocco)	5–0	(Uganda) Vipers SC	Casablanca
20:00 UTC+1	Khabba 5'; Harkass 15'; Zrida 38'; Bouzok 59'; Aholou 71'	Report		Stadium: Mohammed V Stadium; Referee: Boubou Traoré (Mali)

18 February 2023 Matchday 2	Simba SC (Tanzania)	0–3	(Morocco) Raja CA	Dar es Salaam
17:00 UTC+1		Report	Khabba 30'; Benjdida 82'; Mokadem 86' (pen.)	Stadium: National Stadium; Referee: Blaise Yuven Ngwa (Cameroon)

25 February 2023 Matchday 3	Raja CA (Morocco)	2–0	(Guinea) Horoya AC	Casablanca
20:00 UTC+1	Khabba 43'; Zarhouni 89'	Report		Stadium: Mohammed V Stadium; Referee: Peter Waweru (Kenya)

7 March 2023 Matchday 4	Horoya AC (Guinea)	1–3	(Morocco) Raja CA	Bamako (Mali)
16:00 UTC+0	Ndiaye 70'	Report	Sabbar 6', 63'; Nahiri 42'	Stadium: Stade du 26 Mars; Referee: Ibrahim Kalilou Traore (Ivory Coast)

18 March 2023 Matchday 5	Vipers SC (Uganda)	1–1	(Morocco) Raja CA	Entebbe
19:00 UTC+3	Lawal 45+3'	Report	Benjdida 18'	Stadium: St. Mary's Stadium-Kitende; Referee: Mohamed Athoumani (Comoros)

31 March 2023 Matchday 6	Raja CA (Morocco)	3–1	(Tanzania) Simba SC	Casablanca
22:00 UTC+0	Khabba 44', 70'; Boulacsoute 86'	Report	Baleke 49'	Stadium: Mohammed V Stadium; Referee: Ahmad Imtehaz Heeralall (Mauritius)

==== Knockout stage ====
===== Quarter-finals =====
22 April 2023 First leg	Al Ahly (Egypt)	2–0	(Morocco) Raja CA	Cairo
19 UTC+0	Abdelmonem 45+2'; Fathy 84'	Report		Stadium: Cairo International Stadium; Attendance: 52,000; Referee: Mahmood Ismail (Sudan)

29 April 2023 Second leg	Raja CA (Morocco)	0–0	(Egypt) Al Ahly	Casablanca
19 UTC+1		Report		Stadium: Mohammed V Stadium; Attendance: 45,000; Referee: Moataz Ibrahim (Libya)

== Squad information ==
=== Goalscorers ===
Includes all competitive matches. The list is sorted alphabetically by surname when total goals are equal.

Rank	Pos.	Player	Botola	Throne Cup	Champions League	Total
1	FW	(Morocco) Hamza Khabba	2	1	5	8
2	DF	(Morocco) Mohamed Nahiri	4	0	2	6
3	FW	(Morocco) Soufiane Benjdida	3	0	3	6
4	MF	(Morocco) Mohamed Zrida	3	1	1	5
5	DF	(Morocco) Jamal Harkass	3	0	1	4
6	FW	(Algeria) Yousri Bouzok	3	0	1	4
7	FW	(Morocco) Zakaria Habti	2	0	1	3
8	MF	(Morocco) Walid Sabbar	0	1	2	3
9	FW	(Morocco) Nawfel Zarhouni	2	0	1	3
10	DF	(Morocco) Mahmoud Bentayg	2	0	0	2
11	MF	(Togo) Roger Aholou	1	0	1	2
12	FW	(Morocco) Mohamed Boulacsoute	1	0	1	2
13	FW	(Morocco) Zakaria Hadraf	1	0	0	1
14	DF	(Morocco) Ismael Mokadem	0	0	1	1
15	DF	(Morocco) Marouane Hadhoudi	1	0	0	1
16	DF	(Morocco) Bouchaib Arrassi	1	0	0	1
Own goals			2	1	0	2
Total			31	4	20	55

=== Clean sheets ===
No.	Player	Botola	Throne Cup	Champions League	Total
1	(Morocco) Anas Zniti	13	3	5	20
12	(Algeria) Gaya Merbah	1	0	1	2
Total		14	3	6	23
