= 2020 Arab Club Champions Cup final =

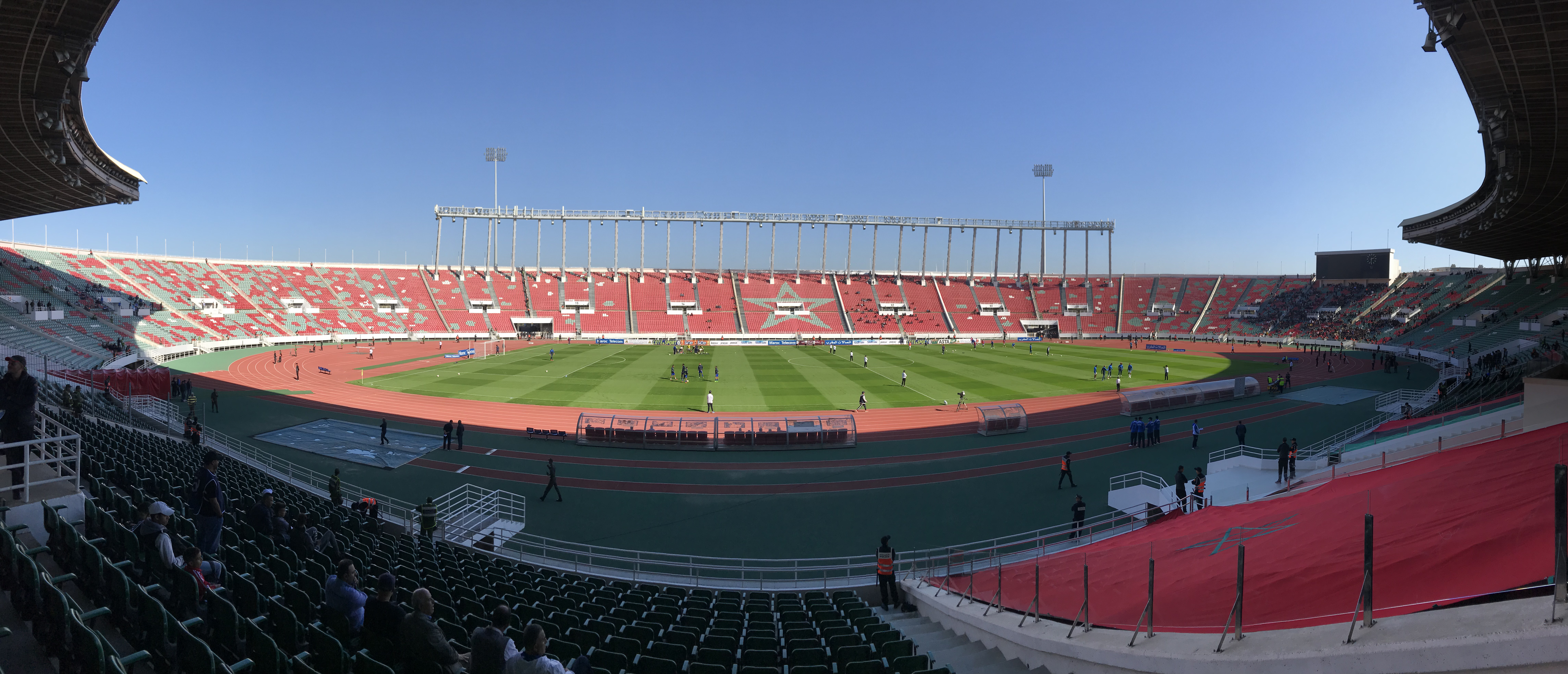
- The Prince Moulay Abdellah Stadium in Rabat hosted the final
- Event: 2019–20 Arab Club Champions Cup
Al-Ittihad Jeddah	Raja CA
(Saudi Arabia)	(Morocco)
4	4
- Raja CA won 4–3 on penalties
- Date: 21 August 2021
- Venue: Prince Moulay Abdellah Stadium, Rabat
- Referee: Mahmoud El Banna (Egypt)
- Attendance: 0 (closed doors)
- Weather: Partly cloudy 27 °C (81 °F); 74% humidity

The 2020 Arab Club Champions Cup final was the final match of the 2019–20 Arab Club Champions Cup, the 29th season of the Arab League's main club football tournament organised by UAFA, and the 2nd season since it was renamed from the Arab Club Championship to the Arab Club Champions Cup. It was played at the Prince Moulay Abdellah Stadium in Rabat. The match was originally scheduled to be played in 2020 but was delayed due to the COVID-19 pandemic which caused postponements during the semi-final stage of the competition. Moroccan club Raja CA beat Saudi side Al-Ittihad Jeddah 4–3 on penalties after a 4–4 draw to earn their second Arab Club Champions Cup title.

== Teams ==
Team	Previous finals appearances (bold indicates winners)
(Saudi Arabia) Al-Ittihad Jeddah	3 (1987, 1994, **2005**)
(Morocco) Raja CA	2 (1996, **2006**)

== Venue ==
On 16 April 2018, the then-president of UAFA Turki Al-Sheikh announced that the Prince Moulay Abdellah Stadium would host the final of the tournament for this season. This was the first UAFA club competition final hosted at the stadium. The stadium was selected as a venue for many tournaments held in Morocco; most recently the 2019 African Games.

The Prince Moulay Abdellah Stadium was built in 1983 and its current capacity is 53,000. It is used by the Morocco national football team and ASFAR as a home stadium.

== Route to the final ==
Both clubs entered the Arab Club Champions Cup at the Round of 32 stage of the competition with the draw made on 27 July 2019. Al-Ittihad Jeddah entered from the Asia Zone with Raja C2 entering from the Africa Zone.

Al-Ittihad Jeddah				Round	Raja CA			
Opponent	Agg.	1st leg	2nd leg		Opponent	Agg.	1st leg	2nd leg
(Lebanon) Al-Ahed	3–0	3–0 (H)	0–0 (A)	First round	(Palestine) Hilal Al-Quds	3–0	1–0 (H)	2–0 (A)
(United Arab Emirates) Al-Wasl	4–1	2–1 (A)	2–0 (H)	Second round	(Morocco) Wydad Casablanca	5–5 (a)	1–1 (H)	4–4 (A)
(Morocco) Olympic Safi	2–1	1–1 (H)	1–0 (A)	Quarter-finals	(Algeria) MC Alger	2–2 (a)	2–1 (A)	0–1 (H)
(Saudi Arabia) Al-Shabab	4–3	2–2 (A)	2–1 (H)	Semi-finals	(Egypt) Ismaily	3–1	0–1 (A)	3–0 (H)

== Match details ==
The "home" team (for administrative purposes) was determined by an additional draw held after the semi-final draw.

21 August 2021
21:00 WAT (UTC+1)

Al-Ittihad Jeddah (Saudi Arabia)	4–4	(Morocco) Raja CA
Bruno Henrique 4'; Romarinho 28' (pen.), 53', 64' (pen.)	Report	Haddad 5'; Benhalib 13'; El Wardi 37'; S. Rahimi 50'
Penalties
Bruno Henrique (penalty missed); Romarinho (penalty scored); Coronado (penalty scored); Al-Muwallad (penalty missed); Al-Malki (penalty scored)	3–4	(penalty scored) S. Rahimi; (penalty scored) Zrida; (penalty missed) Madkour; (penalty scored) Hafidi; (penalty scored) Arjoune

Prince Moulay Abdellah Stadium, Rabat
Attendance: 0 (closed doors)
Referee: Mahmoud El Banna (Egypt)

**Al-Ittihad**	**Raja CA**

GK	45	(Brazil) Marcelo Grohe
RB	66	(Saudi Arabia) Saud Abdulhamid	(yellow card) 41'
CB	44	(Saudi Arabia) Omar Hawsawi	(yellow card) 49'
CB	20	(Morocco) Karim El Ahmadi (c)	(yellow card) 66'	(substituted off) 72'
LB	29	(Saudi Arabia) Muhannad Al-Shanqeeti
CM	8	(Saudi Arabia) Fahad Al-Muwallad
CM	43	(Brazil) Bruno Henrique
CM	27	(Saudi Arabia) Hamdan Al-Shamrani
AM	75	(Brazil) Igor Coronado
CF	77	(Saudi Arabia) Abdulaziz Al-Bishi		(substituted off) 79'
CF	90	(Brazil) Romarinho
Substitutes:
GK	1	(Saudi Arabia) Rakan Al-Najjar
DF	21	(Saudi Arabia) Abdulmohsen Fallatah
DF	32	(Saudi Arabia) Hazim Al-Zahrani
MF	16	(Saudi Arabia) Abdulaziz Al-Jebreen
MF	23	(Saudi Arabia) Abdulrahman Al-Aboud		(substituted on) 79'
MF	88	(Saudi Arabia) Abdulellah Al-Malki		(substituted on) 72'
FW	70	(Saudi Arabia) Haroune Camara
Manager:
(Brazil) Fábio Carille

GK	1	(Morocco) Anas Zniti	(yellow card) 27'
RB	29	(Morocco) Abdelilah Madkour
CB	34	(Morocco) Marouane Hadhoudi
CB	26	(Netherlands) Ilias Haddad	(yellow card) 85'
LB	27	(Morocco) Oussama Soukhane
DM	16	(Morocco) Omar Arjoune
RM	5	(Morocco) Mouhcine Moutouali (c)		(substituted off) 63'
CM	8	(Morocco) Zakaria El Wardi	(yellow card) 55'	(substituted off) 75'
LM	18	(Morocco) Abdelilah Hafidi	(yellow card) 18'
CF	10	(Morocco) Mahmoud Benhalib		(substituted off) 76'
CF	21	(Morocco) Soufiane Rahimi	(yellow card) 51'
Substitutes:
GK	12	(Morocco) Amir El Haddaoui
DF	20	(Morocco) Abdeljalil Jbira
DF	37	(Morocco) Mohammed Naim
MF	6	(Democratic Republic of the Congo) Fabrice Ngoma
MF	14	(Morocco) Zakaria Habti		(substituted on) 76'
MF	19	(Morocco) Mohamed Zrida		(substituted on) 75'
FW	9	(Guinea) Moustapha Kouyaté		(substituted on) 63'
Manager:
(Tunisia) Lassaad Chabbi

Assistant referees:
Mahmoud Abu El-Regal (Egypt)
Ahmed Hossam Taha (Egypt)
Fourth official:
Amin Mohamed Omar (Egypt)
Video assistant referee:
Gehad Grisha (Egypt)

**Match rules**

- 90 minutes
- Penalty shoot-out if scores still level
- Twelve named substitutes
- Maximum of three substitutions.
