= 2021 CAF Super Cup (December) =

TotalEnergies CAF Super Cup 2021
Al Ahly	Raja CA
(Egypt)	(Morocco)
1	1
- Al Ahly won 6–5 on penalties
- Date: 22 December 2021
- Venue: Ahmad bin Ali Stadium, Al Rayyan, Qatar
- Man of the Match: Taher Mohamed (Al Ahly)
- Referee: Jean-Jacques Ndala (DR Congo)
- Attendance: 40,000
- Weather: Fair; 20 °C (68 °F); 60% humidity

The 2021 CAF Super Cup (officially the TotalEnergies CAF Super Cup 2021 for sponsorship reasons) was the 30th CAF Super Cup, an annual football match in Africa organized by the Confederation of African Football (CAF), between the winners of the previous season's two CAF club competitions, the CAF Champions League and the CAF Confederation Cup.

The match was played between Al Ahly from Egypt, the 2020–21 CAF Champions League winners, and Raja CA from Morocco, the 2020–21 CAF Confederation Cup winners, at the Ahmad bin Ali Stadium in Al Rayyan, Qatar on 22 December 2021. Al Ahly won the match 6–5 on penalties, after the original match ended as a 1–1 draw, to win their record-extending eighth and second consecutive title.

== Teams ==
Team	Zone	Qualification	Previous participation (bold indicates winners)
(Egypt) Al Ahly	UNAF (North Africa)	2020–21 CAF Champions League winners	9 (1994, **2002**, **2006**, **2007**, **2009**, **2013**, **2014**, 2015, **2021 (May)**)
(Morocco) Raja CA	UNAF (North Africa)	2020–21 CAF Confederation Cup winners	3 (1998, **2000**, **2019**)

== Venue ==
City	Stadium	Location of the host city of the match.
Al Rayyan (Doha Area)	Ahmad bin Ali Stadium	Location of the host city of the match.
**Capacity: 45,032**		Location of the host city of the match.

== Format ==
The CAF Super Cup is played as a single match at a neutral venue, with the CAF Champions League winners designated as the "home" team for administrative purposes. If the score is tied at the end of regulation, extra time will not be played, and the penalty shoot-out will be used to determine the winner (CAF Champions League Regulations XXVII and CAF Confederation Cup Regulations XXV).

== Background ==
The match was the fourth (and second consecutive) CAF Super Cup to feature an Egyptian and a Moroccan team, with all previous matches ending in favor of the Egyptian side. Al Ahly qualified to the match after defeating South African side Kaizer Chiefs 3–0 in the 2021 CAF Champions League Final. Raja CA earned a place in the match after defeating JS Kabylie of Algeria 2–1 in the 2021 CAF Confederation Cup Final.

This was the seventh meeting between both teams in African competition. All of the previous six encounters were in the CAF Champions League group stage. Raja CA won two matches, including a famous victory in Cairo during their 1999 winning campaign, three matches ended as a draw, and only one win for Al Ahly; a 1–0 victory in 2005 when they won the competition.

== Match ==
=== Details ===
22 December 2021
17:00 GMT
(20:00 UTC+3)

Al Ahly (Egypt)	1–1	(Morocco) Raja CA
Taher 90'	Report	Ibrahim 13' (o.g.)
Penalties
Maâloul (penalty scored); Benoun (penalty scored); Tau (penalty scored); Abdel Kader (penalty scored); Taher (penalty scored); Tawfik (penalty scored)	6–5	(penalty scored) Zrida; (penalty scored) El Wardi; (penalty scored) Hadhoudi; (penalty scored) Benhalib; (penalty scored) Moutouali; (penalty missed) Madkour

Ahmad bin Ali Stadium, Al Rayyan (Qatar)
Attendance: 40,000
Referee: Jean-Jacques Ndala (DR Congo)

**Al Ahly**	**Raja CA**

GK	1	(Egypt) Mohamed El Shenawy (c)
CB	6	(Egypt) Yasser Ibrahim	(yellow card) 66'	(substituted off) 77'
CB	13	(Morocco) Badr Benoun
CB	12	(Egypt) Ayman Ashraf		(substituted off) 46'
RWB	25	(Egypt) Akram Tawfik
LWB	21	(Tunisia) Ali Maâloul
CM	8	(Egypt) Hamdy Fathy
CM	15	(Mali) Aliou Dieng
RW	14	(Egypt) Hussein El Shahat		(substituted off) 61'
CF	23	(South Africa) Percy Tau
LW	19	(Egypt) Mohamed Magdy
Substitutes:
GK	16	(Egypt) Ali Lotfi
DF	5	(Egypt) Ramy Rabia
DF	30	(Egypt) Mohamed Hany
MF	28	(Egypt) Karim Fouad
MF	35	(Egypt) Ahmed Abdel Kader		(substituted on) 61'
FW	10	(Egypt) Mohamed Sherif		(substituted on) 46'
FW	27	(Egypt) Taher Mohamed	(yellow card) 90+1'	(substituted on) 77'
Manager:
(South Africa) Pitso Mosimane

GK	1	(Morocco) Anas Zniti
RB	29	(Morocco) Abdelilah Madkour
CB	24	(Morocco) Marouane Hadhoudi	(yellow card) 58'
CB	35	(Morocco) Jamal Harkass
LB	20	(Morocco) Abdeljalil Jbira
CM	8	(Morocco) Zakaria El Wardi
CM	6	(Democratic Republic of the Congo) Fabrice Ngoma
RW	10	(Morocco) Mahmoud Benhalib
AM	18	(Morocco) Abdelilah Hafidi		(substituted off) 78'
LW	5	(Morocco) Mouhcine Moutouali (c)
CF	7	(Morocco) Hamid Ahadad	(yellow card) 61'	(substituted off) 84'
Substitutes:
GK	12	(Morocco) Amir El Haddaoui
DF	4	(Morocco) Mohamed Souboul
MF	3	(Morocco) Mohamed Zrida		(substituted on) 78'
MF	19	(Morocco) Badr Boulahroud
FW	14	(Morocco) Zakaria Habti
FW	16	(Morocco) Omar Arjoune
FW	21	(Morocco) Soufiane Benjdida		(substituted on) 84'
Manager:
(Belgium) Marc Wilmots

Man of the Match:
Taher Mohamed (Al Ahly)

Assistant referees:
Olivier Safari Kabene (DR Congo)
Gilbert Cheruiyot (Kenya)
Fourth official:
Peter Waweru (Kenya)
Video assistant referee:
Janny Sikazwe (Zambia)
Assistant video assistant referees:
Bakary Gassama (Gambia)
Gerson Emiliano dos Santos (Angola)

**Match rules**

- 90 minutes.
- Penalty shoot-out if scores level.
- Seven named substitutes, of which up to five may be used. (Note: Each team was only given three opportunities to make substitutions, excluding substitutions made at half-time.)

=== Statistics ===
First half
Statistic	Al Ahly	Raja CA
Goals scored	0	1
Total shots	2	2
Shots on target	1	1
Saves	1	1
Ball possession	72%	28%
Corner kicks	5	3
Yellow cards	0	0
Red cards	0	0

Second half
Statistic	Al Ahly	Raja CA
Goals scored	1	0
Total shots	13	3
Shots on target	3	1
Saves	2	1
Ball possession	67%	33%
Corner kicks	3	4
Yellow cards	2	2
Red cards	0	0

Overall
Statistic	Al Ahly	Raja CA
Goals scored	1	1
Total shots	15	5
Shots on target	4	2
Saves	3	2
Ball possession	70%	30%
Corner kicks	8	7
Yellow cards	2	2
Red cards	0	0

== See also ==
- 2021 CAF Champions League Final
- 2021 CAF Confederation Cup Final
