= Fábio Carille =

Brazilian footballer and manager (born 1973)

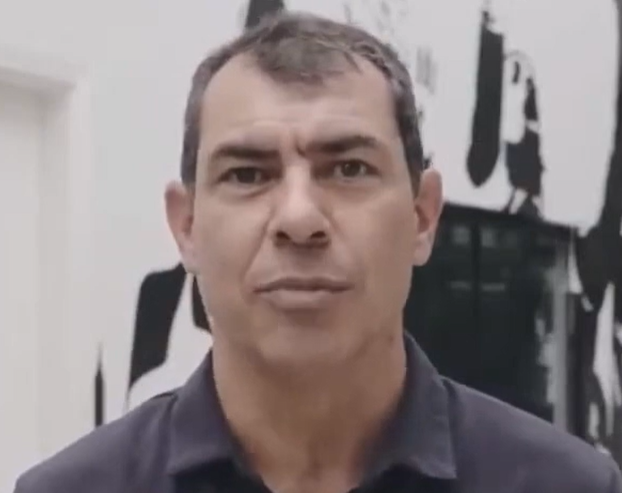
- Carille in 2023

Personal information
- Full name: Fábio Luiz Carille de Araújo
- Date of birth: 26 September 1973 (age 53)
- Place of birth: São Paulo, Brazil
- Height: 1.86 m (6 ft 1 in)
- Positions: Centre back; left back

Team information
- Current team: Damac (head coach)

Senior career*
Years	Team	Apps	(Gls)
1993	Sertãozinho		
1993–1996	XV de Jaú		
1995	→ Corinthians (loan)	0	(0)
1996–2000	Iraty		
1996	→ Paraná (loan)		
1996	→ Coritiba (loan)	14	(0)
1997	→ Santa Cruz (loan)		
1997	→ Paraná (loan)	6	(0)
1998	→ XV de Piracicaba (loan)		
1999	→ Santo André (loan)		
1999	→ CRB (loan)		
2000–2004	Juventus-SP		
2001	→ Botafogo-SP (loan)	10	(0)
2002	→ Paraná (loan)	17	(1)
2003	→ Guangzhou (loan)		
2004	Gama		
2004	União Araxá		
2005	Monte Azul		
2005	Ulbra		
2006–2007	Grêmio Barueri		

Managerial career
- 2007: Grêmio Barueri (interim)
- 2007–2009: Grêmio Barueri (assistant)
- 2008: Grêmio Barueri U20
- 2009–2016: Corinthians (assistant)
- 2010: Corinthians (interim)
- 2016: Corinthians (interim)
- 2016: Corinthians (interim)
- 2017–2018: Corinthians
- 2018: Al-Wehda
- 2019: Corinthians
- 2020–2021: Al-Ittihad
- 2021–2022: Santos
- 2022: Athletico Paranaense
- 2022–2023: V-Varen Nagasaki
- 2024: Santos
- 2025: Vasco da Gama
- 2025: Vitória
- 2025: Goiás
- 2026: Damac
- * Club domestic league appearances and goals

Fábio Luiz Carille de Araújo (born 26 September 1973), known as Fábio Carille, is a Brazilian football coach and former player who played both as a central defender and left back, who is the head coach of Saudi Pro League club Damac.

== Playing career ==
Born in São Paulo, Carille was known as Fábio Luiz during his playing days. He moved to Sertãozinho at the age of 12, and made his senior debut with hometown side Sertãozinho in 1993, after a trial period.

In 1993, Carille moved to XV de Jaú, and impressed enough to earn a loan move to Corinthians in August 1995. He left the club in December, after making no first team appearances, and subsequently moved to Iraty.

Carille subsequently represented Coritiba, Paraná (two stints), Santa Cruz, XV de Piracicaba, Santo André and CRB while on loan from Iraty. In 2000, he signed a permanent deal with Juventus-SP, but also served loan stints at Botafogo-SP, Paraná and Chinese side Guangzhou.

After leaving the Moleque Travesso in 2004, Carille subsequently resumed his career with Gama, União Araxá, Monte Azul, Ulbra and Grêmio Barueri. He retired with the latter in April 2007, aged 33.

== Managerial career ==
=== Grêmio Barueri ===
Immediately after retiring, Carille was named interim coach of Barueri, as head coach Sérgio Soares was relieved from his duties. He would subsequently remain at the club for two more seasons, acting as an assistant and under-20 coach.

=== Corinthians ===
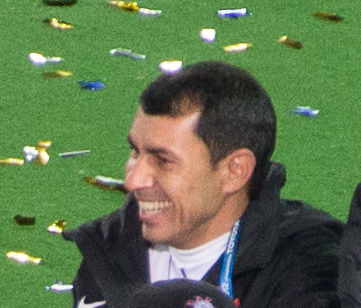
Carille celebrating the 2012 FIFA Club World Cup with Corinthians

In 2009, Carille moved to another club he represented as a player, Corinthians, as Mano Menezes' assistant. On 11 October 2010 he was appointed as interim coach, after Adílson Batista resigned. He returned to his previous duties after the appointment of Tite as head coach, but was again interim in June 2016, as the latter left to manage the Brazil national team.

On 17 September 2016, Carille was named first team coach until the end of the year, replacing dismissed Cristóvão Borges. In October, however, he was replaced by Oswaldo de Oliveira and returned to assistant duties.

On 22 December 2016, Carille was permanently appointed head coach of the main squad for the 2017 campaign. He subsequently won two Campeonato Paulista titles and one Série A with the club before leaving on 22 May after accepting an offer from abroad.

=== Al-Wehda ===
Carille joined Saudi club Al-Wehda in May 2018. He left the club in December, after Corinthians agreed to pay his release clause.

=== Corinthians return ===
On 7 December 2018, Carille was announced as head coach back at former side Corinthians for the ensuing campaign. He won the 2019 Campeonato Paulista with Timão, but was dismissed on 3 November 2019, after a 4–1 loss to Flamengo.

=== Al-Ittihad ===
On 17 February 2020, Carille was appointed as the head coach of the Saudi club, Al-Ittihad. He was sacked on 23 August of the following year, after losing the 2020 Arab Club Champions Cup Final.

=== Santos ===
On 8 September 2021, Carille was appointed head coach of Santos, after signing a contract until the end of 2022. He was sacked on 18 February 2022, after a poor start of the new campaign.

=== Athletico Paranaense ===
On 13 April 2022, Carille was named head coach of Athletico Paranaense also in the top tier, on a two-year contract. On 4 May, after just 21 days and seven matches, he was sacked.

=== V-Varen Nagasaki ===
On 12 June 2022, Carille was announced as manager of J2 League side V-Varen Nagasaki. Despite missing out promotion, his contract was renewed for a further year.

=== Santos return ===
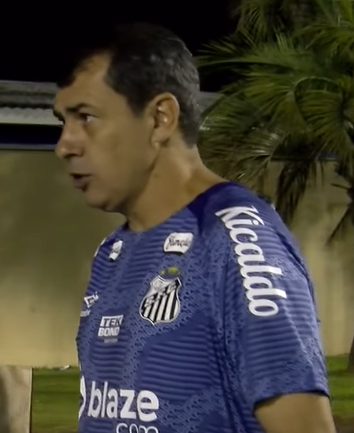
Carille as head coach of Santos in 2024

On 19 December 2023, Santos, recently-relegated to Série B for the first time in their history, announced the return of Carille on a one-year contract, with an option for a further year. He was presented by his new club the following day.

Carille led Santos to the 2024 Campeonato Paulista finals, losing to Palmeiras, and won the 2024 Série B; despite that, he faced severe criticism from the supporters due to the poor football displayed. On 18 November 2024, in spite of having his contract automatically renewed after the promotion, he left by mutual consent.

==== Contract dispute with V-Varen ====
On 20 December 2023, just hours after his presentation, V-Varen Nagasaki released a note claiming that Carille and his staff already have renewed contracts with for 2024 as early as late November 2023, then reconfirmed Carille's intention to manage V-Varen for another year in early December, after they heard about a news that Carille was in negotiations with Santos. On 12 January 2024, Santos announced that they registered Carille as their coach, after knowing that his contract with V-Varen ended on 1 January; V-Varen later released another note stating that Carille and his staff were still under contract for the 2024 season, and that the club will "consider taking appropriate measures" in the future.

=== Vasco da Gama ===
On 19 December 2024, Carille was announced Vasco da Gama head coach for the upcoming season. On 27 April of the following year, he was dismissed.

=== Vitória ===
On 9 July 2025, Carille replaced Thiago Carpini at the helm of Vitória also in the top tier; he agreed to a contract until December 2026. He was sacked on 25 August, hours after a 8–0 loss to Flamengo.

=== Goiás ===
On 13 October 2025, Carille was named head coach of Goiás in the second division. On 8 December, after missing out promotion in the last round, he left by mutual consent.

== Career statistics ==
Club	Season	League			State League		Cup		Continental		Other		Total	
Club	Season	Division	Apps	Goals	Apps	Goals	Apps	Goals	Apps	Goals	Apps	Goals	Apps	Goals
Corinthians	1995	Série A	0	0	—		—		—		—		0	0
Coritiba	1996	Série A	14	0	—		—		—		—		14	0
Paraná	1997	Série A	6	0	—		—		—		—		6	0
Botafogo-SP	2001	Série A	10	0	—		—		—		—		10	0
Paraná	2002	Série A	17	1	—		—		—		—		17	1
Career total			47	1	0	0	0	0	0	0	0	0	47	1

== Managerial statistics ==
As of 20 October 2025

Managerial record by team and tenure
Team	Nat.	From	To	Record								Ref
Team	Nat.	From	To	G	W	D	L	GF	GA	GD	Win %	Ref
Grêmio Barueri (interim)	(Brazil)	11 April 2007	17 April 2007	1	0	0	1	1	2	−1	0.00	
Corinthians (interim)	(Brazil)	11 October 2010	17 October 2010	2	1	0	1	0	2	−2	50.00	
Corinthians (interim)	(Brazil)	15 June 2016	19 June 2016	2	1	0	1	3	2	+1	50.00	
Corinthians (interim)	(Brazil)	17 September 2016	13 October 2016	6	3	1	2	7	6	+1	50.00	
Corinthians	(Brazil)	22 December 2016	22 May 2018	99	53	28	18	132	69	+63	53.54	
Al-Wehda	(Saudi Arabia)	22 May 2018	13 December 2018	15	6	4	5	16	13	+3	40.00	
Corinthians	(Brazil)	13 December 2018	3 November 2019	66	26	24	16	72	56	+16	39.39	
Al-Ittihad	(Saudi Arabia)	17 February 2020	23 August 2021	47	21	16	10	75	45	+30	44.68	
Santos	(Brazil)	8 September 2021	18 February 2022	27	9	10	8	23	23	+0	33.33	
Athletico Paranaense	(Brazil)	13 April 2022	4 May 2022	7	3	0	4	7	10	−3	42.86	
V-Varen Nagasaki	(Japan)	1 July 2022	19 December 2023	63	23	17	23	94	91	+3	36.51	
Santos	(Brazil)	19 December 2023	18 November 2024	53	30	10	13	78	44	+34	56.60	
Vasco da Gama	(Brazil)	19 December 2024	27 April 2025	21	9	5	7	28	21	+7	42.86	
Vitória	(Brazil)	9 July 2025	25 August 2025	9	1	5	3	8	18	−10	11.11	
Goiás	(Brazil)	13 October 2025	8 December 2025	6	3	0	3	6	8	−2	50.00	
Career total				408	181	115	112	550	410	+140	44.36	—

== Honours ==
=== Player ===
Paraná

- Campeonato Paranaense: 1996

=== Coach ===
Corinthians

- Campeonato Brasileiro Série A: 2017
- Campeonato Paulista: 2017, 2018, 2019

Santos

- Campeonato Brasileiro Série B: 2024

=== Individual ===
- Campeonato Paulista Team of the year: 2017
- Campeonato Brasileiro Série A Coach of the Year: 2017
- Saudi Professional League Manager of the Month: October 2018, April & May 2021
