= Abdessamad Badaoui =

Moroccan professional footballer

Personal information
- Date of birth: 24 August 1999 (age 27)
- Place of birth: Casablanca, Morocco
- Height: 1.81 m (5 ft 11 in)
- Position: Right-back

Youth career
- 2011-2019: Raja CA

Senior career*
Years	Team	Apps	(Gls)
2019-2022	JS Soualem	51	(0)
2022-2023	Raja CA	39	(1)

International career^{‡}
2019–2022	Morocco U-23	2	(0)
- * Club domestic league appearances and goals as of 23 December 2023 ‡ National team caps and goals as of 10 October 2023

Abdessamad Badaoui (Arabic: عَبْد الصَّمَد بَدَوِيّ; born 24 August 1999) is a Moroccan professional footballer who plays as a right-back. He began his career as a youth player with Raja CA before joining JS Soualem in 2019 where he gained with them their first ever promotion to Botola. In January 2022, he returned to Raja CA.

== Early life ==
Abdessamad Badaoui was born on 24 August 1999 in Casablanca. He started playing football in the streets before joining the academy of Raja Club Athletic in the Raja-Oasis Complex.

== Club career ==
=== Debut with Raja CA ===
In 2018, Badaoui began to play with the reserves under Abdelilah Fahmi but did not establish himself as a starter.

=== Transfer to JS Soualem and promotion ===
In 2019, he joined Jeunesse Sportive Soualem which had just won the 2017-18 Amateur National Championship (D3) under the direction of Redouane El Haimer. In his first season, he quickly became a starter and the team were very close to promotion but finished in fifth place.

The club of Soualem finished second at the end of the 2020–21 Botola 2 one point behind Olympique de Khouribga, meaning they earned their first ever promotion to the first division.

During the summer of 2021, he refuses to sign for RS Berkane despite an agreement reached between Fouzi Lekjaa and Bouchaib Bencheikh, president of JS Soualem.

On 19 December 2021, after a long-term injury, he made his Botola debut against Youssoufia Berrechid and played 10 minutes (loss 1–2). He will start the next games.

=== Return to Raja CA ===
On 31 January 2022, Abdessamad Badaoui returns to his former club Raja CA and signed a four-and-a-half-year contract.

On 7 April, he played his first match against JS de Kasbah Tadla in the round of 16 of the Throne Cup (0–1 victory).

On 8 October in Niamey, he played his first international match against ASN Nigelec in the second round of the 2022-23 Champions League (victory 0–2).
