= Moustapha Kouyaté =

Guinean footballer

Personal information
- Date of birth: 3 March 1994 (age 32)
- Place of birth: Nzérékoré, Guinea
- Height: 1.80 m (5 ft 11 in)
- Position: Forward

Team information
- Current team: Hafia FC
- Number: 21

Senior career*
Years	Team	Apps	(Gls)
2008–2013	Fello Star		
2013	FUS Rabat		
2013–2016	Kaloum		
2015–2016	O'Mbilaziami		
2015–2016	Bitam		
2016–2017	Akanda		
2017	Bosher		
2017–2019	Muscat		
2019–2020	Ibri		
2020–2021	Mazembe		
2021–2022	RAJA		
2022–	Hafia FC		

International career^{‡}
2021–	Guinea	1	(0)
- * Club domestic league appearances and goals as of 00:11, 26 March 2021 (UTC) ‡ National team caps and goals as of 00:11, 26 March 2021 (UTC)

Moustapha Kouyaté (born 3 March 1994) is a Guinean footballer who plays as a forward for Hafia FC and the Guinea national team.

== Career ==
Kouyaté began his career in his native Guinea, before stints abroad in Morocco, Gabon, Oman. He transferred to the Congolese club Mazembe in October 2020. On 19 August he signed at Raja Casablanca.

== International career ==
Kouyaté made his debut with the Guinea national team in a 1–0 2021 Africa Cup of Nations qualification win over Mali on 24 March 2021.
