= Soufiane Benjdida =

Moroccan footballer (born 2001)

Personal information
- Date of birth: 5 September 2001 (age 25)
- Place of birth: Casablanca, Morocco
- Height: 1.78 m (5 ft 10 in)
- Position: Forward

Team information
- Current team: Al Ahly
- Number: 9

Youth career
- 2012–2015: AMF
- 2015–2016: Fath US
- 2016–2018: AS FAR
- 2018–2021: Raja CA

Senior career*
Years	Team	Apps	(Gls)
2021–2023	Raja CA	64	(14)
2023–2024	SL16 FC	23	(6)
2024–2025	Standard Liège	15	(2)
2025	→ RWD Molenbeek (loan)	10	(1)
2025–2026	MAS Fès	30	(20)
2026–	Al Ahly	0	(0)

International career^{‡}
2020–2021	Morocco U20	0	(0)
2021–2023	Morocco U23	13	(6)
2026–	Morocco	1	(0)
- * Club domestic league appearances and goals as of 06:22, 7 July 2026 (UTC) ‡ National team caps and goals as of 29 May 2026

Soufiane Benjdida (Arabic: سفيان بنجديدة; born 5 September 2001) is a Moroccan professional footballer who plays as a forward for Al Ahly and the Morocco national team.

== Career ==
On 29 August 2023, Benjdida joined Standard Liège in the Belgian Pro League. He was assigned to their second squad SL16 FC in the second-tier Challenger Pro League.

On 14 January 2025, Benjdida moved on loan to RWD Molenbeek in Challenger Pro League, with an option to buy. On 9 April 2025, R.W.D. Molenbeek ended Benjdida loan with immediate effect, as he punched his teammate Achraf Laaziri after 1–1 draw with Patro Eisden.

In July 2026, Benjdida agreed to join Egyptian Premier League club Al Ahly from Standard Liège. The Moroccan forward said the opportunity to join one of Africa's biggest clubs and compete for domestic and continental titles played a key role in his decision.

== Honours ==
MAS Fès

- Botola Pro: 2025–26

Individual

- Botola Pro top goalscorer: 2025–26
