= Lassaad Chabbi =

Tunisian football manager (born 1961)

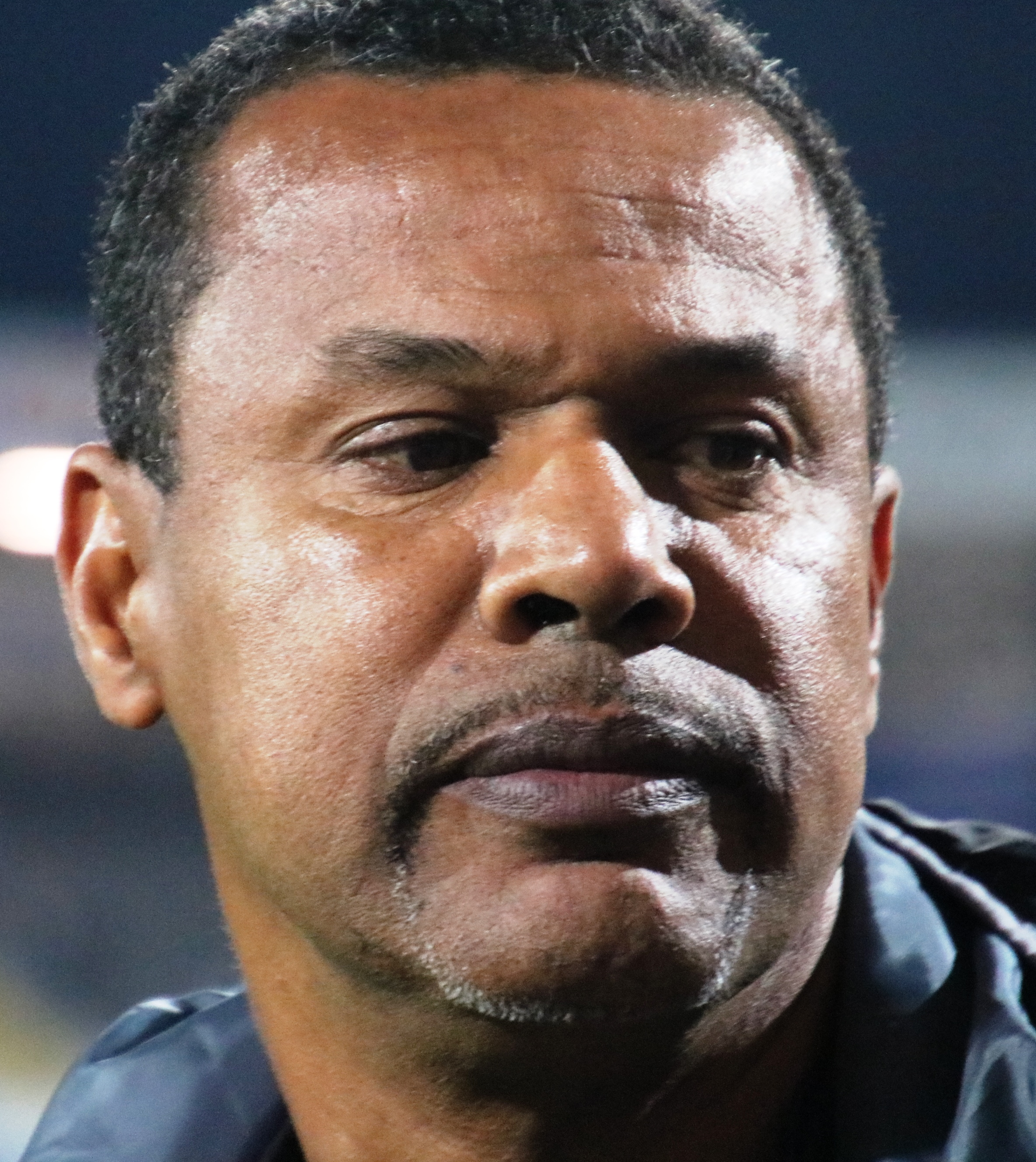
- Chabbi in 2017

Personal information
- Full name: Lassaad Jarda Chabbi
- Date of birth: 23 August 1961 (age 65)
- Place of birth: Tunis, Tunisia
- Position: Defender

Team information
- Current team: ES Sétif (manager)

Managerial career
- Years: Team
- 2006–2007: FC Rätia Bludenz
- 2007–2014: AKA Vorarlberg (Youth teams)
- 2014: El Jaish SC
- 2015–2017: Austria Lustenau
- 2017–2018: SV Ried
- 2018: Ratchaburi Mitr Phol
- 2019–2021: US Monastir
- 2021: Raja CA
- 2022: Étoile du Sahel
- 2022–2023: Difaa El Jadida
- 2023: Asswehly SC
- 2024: US Monastir
- 2024: Kazma SC
- 2025: Raja CA
- 2025: OC Safi
- 2025–2026: Al-Khaldiya
- 2026–: ES Sétif

Lassaad Jarda Chabbi (Arabic: لسعد الشابي; born 23 August 1961) is a Tunisian football manager.

== Personal life ==
Chabbi is the father of professional football players Seifedin Chabbi and Nino Chabbi.

== Managerial career ==
For his first season as manager of US Monastir, the team finished the season in the third place and won the national cup on 27 September 2020

== Honours ==
=== Managerial ===
US Monastir

- Tunisian Cup: 2019–20

Raja CA

- CAF Confederation Cup: 2020–21
- Arab Club Champions Cup: 2019–20

Al-Khaldiya SC

- Bahraini Super Cup: 2025-26
