= Mohamed Zrida =

Moroccan footballer (born 1999)

Personal information
- Date of birth: 1 February 1999 (age 27)
- Place of birth: Casablanca, Morocco
- Height: 1.80 m (5 ft 11 in)
- Position: Midfielder

Youth career
- 2014–2019: Raja CA

Senior career*
Years	Team	Apps	(Gls)
2019–2025	Raja CA	137	(8)
2025–2026	Al Ittihad	11	(0)

International career^{‡}
2017–2019	Morocco U20		
2019–2021	Morocco U23	11	(0)
2021–	Morocco A'	6	(0)
- * Club domestic league appearances and goals as of 19 March 2026 ‡ National team caps and goals as of 18 April 2024

Mohamed Zrida (Arabic: محمد زريدة; born 1 February 1999) is a Moroccan professional footballer who plays as a midfielder.

== Early life ==
Mohamed Zrida was born on 1 February 1999 in Hay Mohammadi, Casablanca, where he began to play football. Aged 7, his mother tries to sign him up for Tihad Athletic Sport but the prices were too expensive for her.

At 9, he joined the youth center of his neighborhood, located in Hay Adil, where he played futsal for nearly five years. He then played for FCC Casablanca for a while before joining the Raja Club Athletic Oasis academy in 2014.

== Career ==
In January 2019, with the arrival of Patrice Carteron, Mohamed Zrida joined the first team training, but got no playing time.

On 4 May, he made his professional debut against Rapide Oued-Zem in the Botola and gave his first assist to Zakaria Hadraf in a game that ended with a 3–3 tie.

On 28 January 2020, Jamal Sellami added him to his Champions League squad list. He immediately made his African debut as a starter in the quarter-finals against TP Mazembe (2–0 victory). While Omar Boutayeb and Abderrahim Achchakir were both injured, he played the second leg as a right-back and helped his team to gain qualification from Lubumbashi.

On 3 March, the club awarded him the Eagle of the month prize for the best Raja player of February. On 8 August, he renewed his contract until 2025.

On 11 October, Botola leaders Raja received AS FAR in the final game and needed a win to secure the title. After the visitors has scored the opener, Abdelilah Hafidi tied the score and then scored a dramatic late winner to crown Raja as 2019–20 champions of Morocco, their first league title since 2012–13.

On 10 July 2021, Raja CA beat JS Kabylie in the Confederation Cup final and secured their third title of the competition (2–1 victory).

On 18 February 2022 in Algiers, Zrida scored his first goal and offers the win to Raja CA against ES Sétif in the 2021-22 Champions League group stage.

On 31 July 2023, he score his tenth goal with Raja in the Arab Cup of Champions Clubs against Kuweit SC, in a 2–0 victory that qualified Raja CA for the quarter-finals.

On 3 January 2024, he scored the second goal of the Derby against Wydad AC in Mohammedia (2–0 win).

== International career ==
On 20 March 2021, he was called up by Houcine Ammouta to join the Moroccan A' national team for a preparation camp between 23 and 29 March.

== Honours ==
Raja CA

- Botola: 2019–20, 2023–24; runner-up: 2018–19, 2020–21, 2021–22
- Arab Club Champions Cup: 2019–20
- CAF Confederation Cup: 2020–21
- Throne Cup: 2023–24; runner-up: 2021–22
- CAF Super Cup runner-up: 2021

Individual

- Eagle of the month award for the best Raja CA player (February 2020).
- Goal of the month award for Raja CA (February 2022).
