= Zakaria Habti =

Moroccan footballer

Personal information
- Date of birth: 6 February 1998 (age 28)
- Place of birth: Casablanca, Morocco
- Height: 1.75 m (5 ft 9 in)
- Position: Winger

Team information
- Current team: OC Safi

Youth career
- 2010-2019: Raja CA

Senior career*
Years	Team	Apps	(Gls)
2019-2023	Raja CA	46	(3)
2023–2024	AS FAR	16	(2)
2025–	OC Safi	0	(0)
- * Club domestic league appearances and goals as of 31 January 2025

Zakaria Habti (Arabic: زكرياء الهبطي; born 6 February 1998) is a Moroccan professional footballer who plays as a winger for OC Safi.

== Career ==
In the summer of 2019, Habti was called up to the first team by Patrice Carteron and flied to Agadir for a preseason camp held between the 12 and 21 July. He made his debut in a friendly match against the English side of Oldham Athletic FC alongside Mahmoud Benhalib and Mouhcine Iajour in the front line.

On 10 August in Banjul, he made his professional debut during the first game of the season against Brikama United in the first round of the 2019-20 Champions League (draw 3–3).

On 10 January 2020, he made it to the starting line-up for the first time under Jamal Sellami against JS Kabylie at the 1 November 1954 Stadium in Tizi-Ouzou in the group stage of the Champions League (draw 0–0).

On 15 January 2021, the club announced the extension of Zakaria Habti's contract until the end of the 2023–2024 season.

On 3 March, he delivered his first assist in the quarter-final of the Throne Cup against the US Sidi Kacem (2–0 victory).

On 21 April, he scored his first professional goal against the Namungo FC in the Confederation Cup group stage. He also assisted Ilias Haddad (3–0 victory).

On 27 June, he was injured against Pyramids FC in the semi-final second leg of the Confederation Cup. Medical examinations reveal sprained ankle ligaments and is therefore withdrawn from the decisive Derby scheduled a few days later. However, he returned in time to fly with the team to Cotonou to play in the final of the Confederation Cup. He does not play a minute and Raja beat JS Kabylie (2–1).

== Honours ==
- Botola Pro: 2019–20 runner-up: 2020-21, 2021-22, 2023-24
- Arab Club Champions Cup: 2019–20
- CAF Confederation Cup: 2020–21
- Moroccan Throne Cup runner-up: 2022–23, 2023–24
