= Hamid Ahadad =

Moroccan footballer

Personal information
- Full name: Hamid Ahadad
- Date of birth: 30 November 1994 (age 31)
- Place of birth: Agadir, Morocco
- Height: 1.78 m (5 ft 10 in)
- Position: Forward

Team information
- Current team: Hassania Agadir
- Number: 17

Senior career*
Years	Team	Apps	(Gls)
2016–2018	DHJ	66	(20)
2018–2021	Zamalek	24	(12)
2019–2020	→ Raja CA (loan)	30	(15)
2021–2022	Raja CA	28	(12)
2022–2025	Wydad AC	32	(16)
2025–2026	East Bengal	8	(4)
2026-	Hassania Agadir	0	(0)

International career^{‡}
2019-2022	Morocco	1	(0)
- * Club domestic league appearances and goals ‡ National team caps and goals as of 30 April 2026

Hamid Ahadad (born 30 November 1994) is a Moroccan footballer currently playing for Hassania Agadir as a forward.

== International career ==
=== International goals ===
Scores and results list Morocco's goal tally first.

No.	Date	Venue	Opponent	Score	Result	Competition
1.	19 October 2019	Stade Municipal, Berkane, Morocco	Algeria	2–0	3–0	2020 African Nations Championship qualification

== Honours ==
Raja Casablanca

- Botola: 2019–20

Zamalek

- Egyptian Premier League 2020–21
- Saudi-Egyptian Super Cup: 2018
- CAF Confederation Cup: 2018–19

Individual

- Raja CA Goal of the Month: March 2022
