= Zakaria El Wardi =

Moroccan footballer

Personal information
- Date of birth: 17 August 1998 (age 28)
- Place of birth: Casablanca, Morocco
- Height: 1.83 m (6 ft 0 in)
- Position: Midfielder

Team information
- Current team: Raja CA
- Number: 10

Youth career
- –2016: Moghreb Tétouan

Senior career*
| Years | Team | Apps | (Gls) |
| 2016–2019 | Moghreb Tétouan | 20 | (0) |
| 2019–2022 | Raja CA | 120 | (3) |
| 2022 | Zamalek SC | 6 | (0) |
| 2023– | Raja CA | 20 | (3) |

International career^{‡}
| 2016–2018 | Morocco U20 | 4 | (0) |
| 2018–2021 | Morocco U23 | 3 | (0) |
| 2019– | Morocco | 2 | (0) |
Medal record
Representing Morocco
Jeux de la Francophonie
| Winner | 2017 Ivory Coast |
- * Club domestic league appearances and goals as of 2 January 2024 ‡ National team caps and goals as of 2 January 2024

Zakaria El Wardi (Arabic: زكرياء الوردي; born 17 August 1998) is a Moroccan professional footballer who plays as a midfielder for Raja CA as a midfielder.

== Club career ==
=== Moghreb Tétouan ===
Born on 17 August 1998, Zakaria El Wardi joined the Moghreb Atlético Tétouan training center at a very young age, where he did not find many difficulties in establishing himself in the club's different age categories. After he was called up to the Morocco under-20 team, he joined Tétouan's first team under Spaniard coach Sergio Lobera despite his very young age.

=== Raja CA ===
In 2018–19, he played a very good first half of Botola, and several major clubs, including Raja CA and Wydad AC, were interested in signing him. It was ultimately the Greens who recruited him on a 3 1/2-year contract, he declared 'I received several offers from other clubs, but I chose Raja because I love this club and It has been always my dream of playing for it'.

On 29 March 2019, Zakaria won his first club title at the Jassim-bin-Hamad Stadium in Doha for the African Super Cup, he started in Patrice Carteron's line-up which beat Esperance de Tunis (2–1).

On 21 February 2020, he scored his first professional goal on a penalty against Raja Beni Mellal (1–2 victory). On October 11, Raja were crowned 2019–20 champions of Morocco, their first league title since 2012–13, thank to a Abdelilah Hafidi brace against AS FAR.

On 6 March 2021, he received the 'Eagle of the Month' award for the club's best player during the month of February. On 5 March, medical tests showed that he will need to undergo a meniscus surgery that will keep him away for at least six weeks. Days before, he had received a pre-call-up to the National team by Vahid Halilhodzic, for the double confrontation with DR Congo in the 2022 FIFA World Cup qualification final round, on March 25 and 29, in Kinshasa then Casablanca.

On 10 July, Raja CA won the Confederation Cup's final against the JS Kabylie and secured their third title of the competition (2–1).

On 21 August, El Wardi scored in the 2019–20 Arab Club Champions Cup final against Ittihad FC. Raja won the competition on penalties after a thrilling final that ended in a 4–4 draw.

In July 2022, as he reached the end of his contract, it was announced that he had refused to play the last matches of the season. He then left the club on bad terms with the supporters and with club president Aziz El Badraoui.

=== Zamalek and return to Raja CA ===
On August 23, after the failure of an imminent transfer to Le Havre AC, El Wardi joined Zamalek SC as a free agent signing a three-season contract.

On 8 December, the club announced the termination of his contract by mutual consent after spending less than 4 months in Cairo. Sources close to the player claim that he has depression.

On 16 January 2023, Raja CA announced his return after Aziz El Badraoui himself had communicated it a few days earlier.

== International career ==
On 30 July 2017, he won the gold medal of the 2017 Jeux de la Francophonie with Morocco U20, beating the hosts Ivory Coast in the final (1-1, 7–6 on penalties) and scored the second penalty.

On 18 August 2019, he was selected by Patrice Beaumelle with the Moroccan U-23 team for a double confrontation against Mali counting for qualifications for the 2019 U-23 Africa Cup of Nations.

In March 2022, he received a pre-call-up to the National team by Vahid Halilhodzic, for the double confrontation with DR Congo in the 2022 FIFA World Cup qualification final round. However, he suffered a meniscus injury that prevented him from joining the Atlas Lions.

== Honours ==
Raja CA

- Botola: 2019–20
- CAF Confederation Cup: 2021
- CAF Super Cup: 2019
- Arab Champions Cup: 2020

Morocco U20

- Jeux de la Francophonie gold medalist: 2017
