= Badr Boulahroud =

Moroccan international footballer

Personal information
- Date of birth: 21 April 1993 (age 33)
- Place of birth: Rabat, Morocco
- Height: 1.78 m (5 ft 10 in)
- Position: Midfielder

Youth career
- FUS Rabat

Senior career*
Years	Team	Apps	(Gls)
2013–2018	FUS Rabat	77	(0)
2018–2020	Málaga	28	(1)
2021–2022	Raja CA	8	(0)
2022–2023	Ohod	30	(0)

International career^{‡}
2017–	Morocco	9	(1)
- * Club domestic league appearances and goals as of 20:11, 18 February 2021 (UTC) ‡ National team caps and goals as of 21:22, 18 February 2021 (UTC)

Badr Boulahroud (born 21 April 1993) is a Moroccan international footballer who plays as a midfielder.

== Club career ==
Born in Rabat, Boulahroud began his career with hometown side FUS Rabat.

On 6 July 2018, Boulahroud signed a three-year deal with Spanish Segunda División side Málaga, for a reported fee of €600,000. He left Málaga in October 2020.

He returned to Morocco in February 2021 to sign for Raja.

On 25 July 2022, Boulahroud joined Saudi Arabian club Ohod.

== International career ==
He made his senior international debut for Morocco in 2017.

=== International goals ===
Scores and results list Morocco's goal tally first.

No.	Date	Venue	Opponent	Score	Result	Competition
1.	18 August 2017	Prince Moulay Abdellah Stadium, Rabat, Morocco	Egypt	3–0	3–1	2018 African Nations Championship qualification
