= Fabrice Ngoma =

Congolese footballer

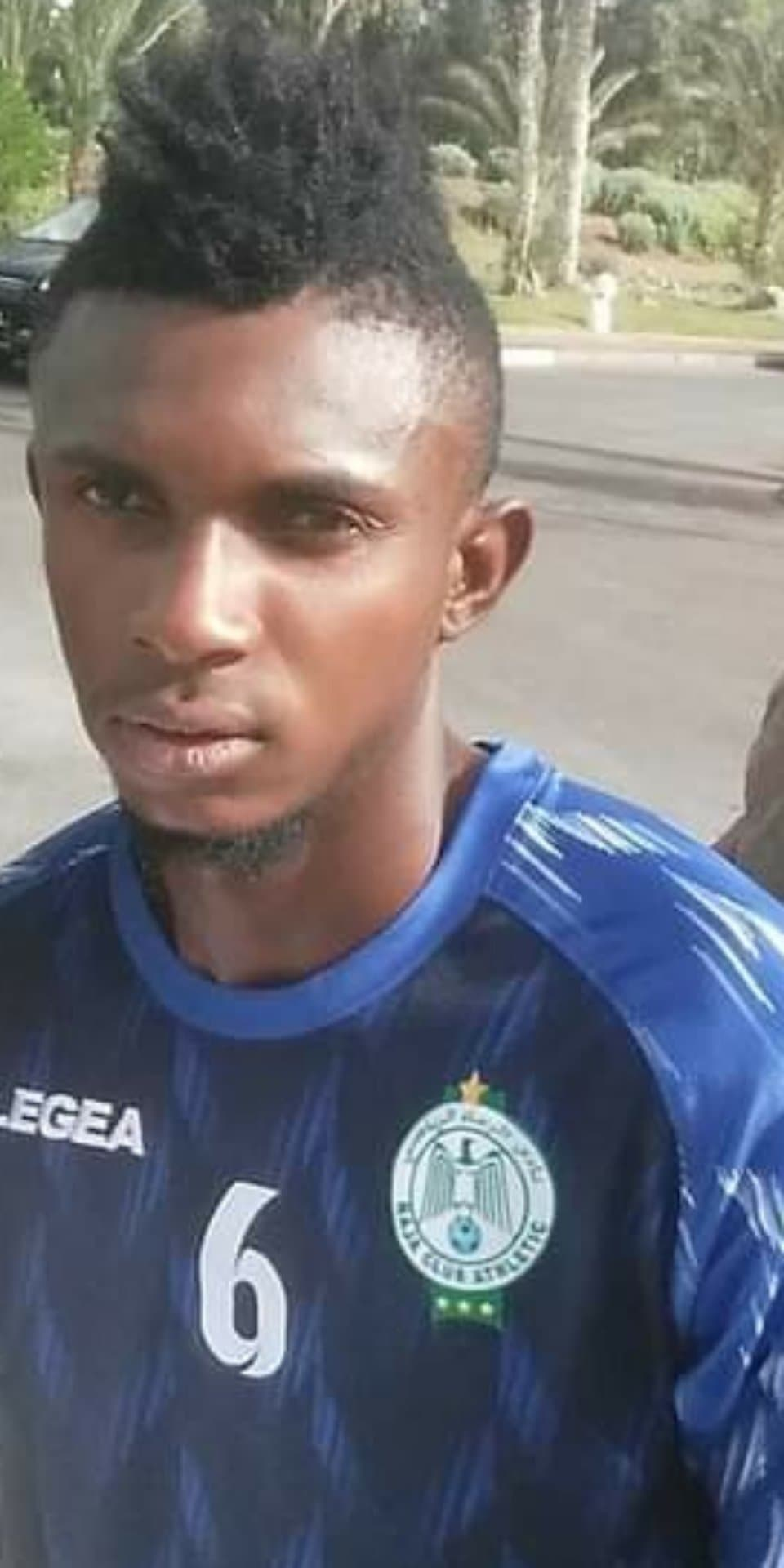
- Fabrice Ngoma in 2019

Personal information
- Full name: Fabrice Luamba Ngoma
- Date of birth: 22 January 1994 (age 32)
- Place of birth: Kinshasa, Zaire
- Height: 1.88 m (6 ft 2 in)
- Position: Midfielder

Senior career*
Years	Team	Apps	(Gls)
2013–2014	FC Arc-en-Ciel		
2014–2015	Sharks XI		
2015–2017	MK Etanchéité		
2017	Ifeanyi Ubah	15	(0)
2017–2019	AS Vita Club		
2019–2022	Raja CA	18	(0)
2022-2023	Al-Fahaheel SC		
2023	Al-Hilal Club		
2023–2025	Simba		

International career^{‡}
2018–	DR Congo	17	(0)
- * Club domestic league appearances and goals as of 22:21, 22 April 2025 (UTC) ‡ National team caps and goals as of 20:20, 15 February 2021 (UTC)

Fabrice Luamba Ngoma (born 22 January 1994) is a Congolese professional footballer who plays as a midfielder for the DR Congo national football team.
