= Ilias Haddad =

Dutch footballer (born 1989)

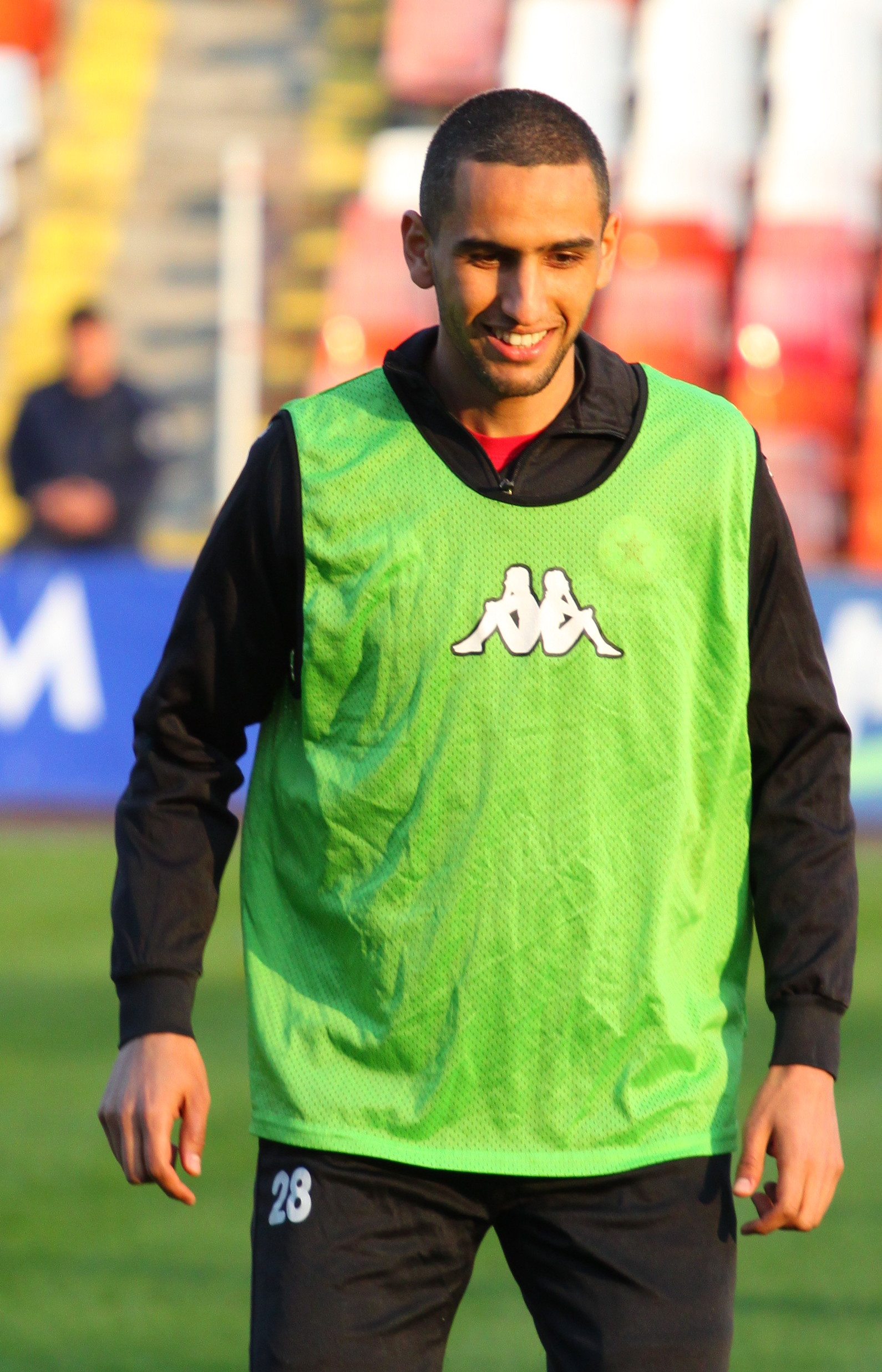
- Haddad in 2012

Personal information
- Date of birth: 1 March 1989 (age 37)
- Place of birth: Dordrecht, Netherlands
- Height: 1.87 m (6 ft 2 in)
- Position: Centre-back

Youth career
- DVV Merwesteijn
- Feyenoord
- Excelsior
- AZ

Senior career*
Years	Team	Apps	(Gls)
2009–2011	AZ	0	(0)
2009–2011	→ Telstar (loan)	47	(1)
2011	St Mirren	10	(0)
2012	CSKA Sofia	3	(0)
2013–2015	Dordrecht	60	(1)
2015–2018	FAR Rabat	73	(2)
2018–2022	Raja Casablanca	66	(0)
2022–2026	Union Touarga	38	(5)

International career
2007	Netherlands U18	1	(0)
2007-2008	Netherlands U19	2	(0)
- * Club domestic league appearances and goals as of 11:39, 12 November 2025 (UTC)

Ilias Haddad (Arabic: إلياس الحداد; born 1 March 1989) is a Dutch retired footballer who plays as a centre-back for Union Touarga.

== Career ==
As a youth, Haddad spent time with hometown club DVV Merwesteijn, Feyenoord and SBV Excelsior, where he signed his first professional contract before moving to AZ. He made his professional debut at first division club Telstar, where he played on loan.

Haddad signed for Scottish Premier League club St Mirren on 19 August 2011, that keep him until January. He joined fellow Dutchman Jeroen Tesselaar, who Haddad played alongside at Telstar. Haddad made his debut, the next day on 20 August 2011, coming on as a substitute for Paul McGowan, in a 2–1 win over Hibernian. In September, Haddad hints he might extend his contract with his contract is about to expire in January. In November 2011, Manager Danny Lennon says he hopes Haddad to sign a new contract, that will keep him until the end of the season despite suffering a family bereavement. In late-December, Lennon says he will be withdrawing Haddad's contract, citing financial problem

After leaving St Mirren, Haddad then moved to Bulgaria by joining CSKA Sofia until the end of the season. At first, CSKA Sofia confirmed their interest in signing Haddad jthem However, he would make just three appearances

After six-months without a club, Haddad signed for FC Dordrecht until the end of the season.the next season, fc dordrecht got promoted after 18 years to the Eredivisie

Later on, Haddad played for AS FAR and Raja Casablanca in Morocco.

== International career ==
Haddad has been capped for the Netherlands at Under 18 and Under 19 level.

== Personal life ==
He holds both Dutch and Moroccan nationalities.

== Honours ==
Raja Casablanca

- Coupe Arabe 2021
- Moroccan League: 2020
- CAF Confederation Cup: 2018, 2021
- CAF Super Cup: 2019
- In 2006–07, Haddad was awarded the best player of Eredivisie A-Juniors.
