= 2018–19 Raja CA season =

Raja CA
2018–19 season
- President: Jawad Ziyat (from 13 September 2018)
- Manager: Juan Carlos Garrido (until 28 January 2019); Patrice Carteron (from 29 January 2019)
- Stadium: Stade Mohamed V
- Botola: Runners-up
- Throne Cup: Semi-final
- Confederation Cup: 2018: Winners; 2019: Group stage
- CAF Super Cup: Winners
- Arab Club Champions Cup: Quarter-finals
- Top goalscorer: League: Mouhcine Iajour (19 goals); All: Mouhcine Yajour (29 goals)
- Average home league attendance: 15,038
Home colours	Away colours	Third colours

The 2018–19 season is Raja CA's 70th season in existence and the club's 62nd consecutive season in the top flight of Moroccan football. They competing in Botola, the Throne Cup, Confederation Cup, CAF Super Cup and Arab Club Champions Cup.

== Squad list ==
Players and squad numbers last updated on 25 August 2018.
Note: Flags indicate national team as has been defined under FIFA eligibility rules. Players may hold more than one non-FIFA nationality.

No.	Name	Nat.	Position	Date of birth (age)	Signed from
Goalkeepers
1	Anas Zniti	(Morocco)	GK	28 October 1988 (aged 29)	(Morocco) AS FAR
22	Mohamed Bouamira	(Morocco)	GK	21 February 1988 (aged 30)	(Morocco) Chabab Rif Al Hoceima
12	Mohamed Chennouf	(Morocco)	GK	14 May 1995 (aged 23)	(Morocco) Youth system
Defenders
13	Badr Benoun	(Morocco)	CB	30 September 1993 (aged 24)	(Morocco) Youth system
8	Sanad Al Warfali	(Libya)	CB	17 May 1992 (aged 26)	(Libya) Al Ahli SC
26	Ilias Haddad	(Morocco)	CB	1 March 1989 (aged 29)	(Morocco) AS FAR
16	Mohamed Oulhaj	(Morocco)	CB	6 January 1988 (aged 30)	(Morocco) Youth system
NA	Salif Coulibaly	(Mali)	CB	13 May 1988 (aged 30)	(Egypt) Al Ahly SC
6	Saad Lakohal	(Morocco)	CB	5 April 1998 (aged 20)	(Morocco) Youth system
5	Fabrice Ngah	(Cameroon)	LB	16 October 1997 (aged 20)	(Morocco) Difaâ Hassani El Jadidi
20	Abdeljalil Jbira	(Morocco)	LB	14 March 1990 (aged 28)	(Morocco) Kawkab Marrakech
NA	Mohamed Aymen Sadil	(Morocco)	LB	10 June 1994 (aged 24)	(Morocco) Youssoufia Berrechid
NA	Muller Dinda	(Gabon)	LB	22 September 1995 (aged 22)	(Morocco) Wydad Témara
NA	Mohamed Erroutbi	(Morocco)	LB	30 July 1997 (aged 21)	(Switzerland) FC Azzurri 90
NA	Zakaria Drouich	(Morocco)	LB	11 January 2001 (aged 17)	(Morocco) Youth system
25	Omar Boutayeb	(Morocco)	RB	19 April 1994 (aged 24)	(Morocco) Youth system
4	Mohamed Douik	(Morocco)	RB	1 March 1999 (aged 19)	(Morocco) Youth system
3	Imrane Fiddi	(Morocco)	RB	10 October 1998 (aged 19)	(Morocco) Youth system
Midfielders
2	Abderrahim Achchakir	(Morocco)	DM	15 December 1986 (aged 31)	(Morocco) AS FAR
19	Baye Ibrahima Niasse	(Senegal)	DM	18 April 1988 (aged 30)	(Greece) Levadiakos
23	Salaheddine Bahi	(Morocco)	DM	1 October 1994 (aged 23)	(Morocco) Club Ben Guerir
NA	Mohamed Zrida	(Morocco)	DM	1 February 1999 (aged 19)	(Morocco) Youth system
14	Lema Mabidi	(Democratic Republic of the Congo)	CM	11 June 1993 (aged 25)	(Tunisia) CS Sfaxien
17	Zakaria El Wardi	(Morocco)	CM	17 August 1998 (aged 20)	(Morocco) Moghreb Tétouan
NA	Ayoub Khairi	(Morocco)	CM	16 February 2000 (aged 18)	(Morocco) Youth system
NA	Mouad Mouchtanim	(Morocco)	CM	19 January 1999 (aged 19)	(Morocco) Youth system
NA	Hassan Bouain	(Morocco)	RW	24 April 1999 (aged 19)	(Morocco) Youth system
18	Abdelilah Hafidi	(Morocco)	AM	30 January 1992 (aged 26)	(Morocco) Youth system
10	Saifeddine Alami	(Morocco)		19 November 1992 (aged 25)	(France) Paris FC
Forwards
7	Zakaria Hadraf	(Morocco)	LW	18 June 1990 (aged 28)	(Morocco) Difaâ Hassani El Jadidi
21	Soufiane Rahimi	(Morocco)	LW	2 June 1996 (aged 22)	(Morocco) Étoile de Casablanca
24	Mahmoud Benhalib	(Morocco)	LW	23 March 1996 (aged 22)	(Morocco) Youth system
11	Anas Jabroun	(Morocco)	LW	7 October 1997 (aged 20)	(Morocco) Moghreb Tétouan
NA	Hicham Islah	(Morocco)	RW	3 March 1999 (aged 19)	(Morocco) Youth system
14	Zakaria Habti	(Morocco)	RW	6 February 1998 (aged 20)	(Morocco) Youth system
30	Ayoub Nanah	(Morocco)	SS	12 November 1992 (aged 25)	(Morocco) Difaâ Hassani El Jadidi
9	Mouhssine Iajour	(Morocco)	ST	14 June 1985 (aged 33)	(Morocco) Al-Khor SC
28	Muhammad Shaban	(Uganda)	ST	11 January 1998 (aged 20)	(Uganda) Kampala City

== Transfers ==
=== In ===
Date	Pos	Player	From club	Transfer fee	Source
12 June 2018	MF	(Senegal) Baye Ibrahima Niasse	(Greece) Levadiakos	Free transfer	
4 July 2022	FW	(Morocco) Anas Jabroun	Moghreb Tétouan	Free transfer	
10 July 2022	MF	(Morocco) Salaheddine Bahia	Club Ben Guerir	Free transfer	
17 July 2022	MF	(Morocco) Saifeddine Alami	(France) Paris FC	Free transfer	
17 July 2022	DF	(Morocco) Ilias Haddad	AS FAR	Free transfer	
28 July 2022	DF	(Libya) Sanad Al Warfali	(Libya) Al Ahli SC	Loan for one year	
15 August 2022	FW	(Uganda) Muhammad Shaban	(Uganda) Kampala City	Free transfer	
18 September 2018	DF	(Gabon) Muller Dinda	Wydad Témara	Free transfer	

=== Out ===
Date	Pos	Player	To club	Transfer fee	Source
21 May 2018	DF	(Morocco) Adil Kerrouchi	Retired	—N/a	
7 June 2018	MF	(Morocco) Abdeladim Khadrouf	Chabab Rif Al Hoceima	Free transfer	
7 June 2018	FW	(Central African Republic) Hilaire Momi	SC Mouloudia Dakhla	Free transfer	
7 June 2018	DF	(Morocco) Ismaïl Benlamaalem	AS FAR	Free transfer	
12 June 2018	MF	(Morocco) Mounir Obbadi	(France) Stade Lavallois	Free transfer	
14 June 2018	MF	(Morocco) Abdelkabir El Ouadi	Ittihad Tanger	Free transfer	
22 July 2018	FW	(Morocco) Zouheir El Ouasli	Olympique Khouribga	Free transfer	

== Competitions ==
=== Overview ===
Competition	Record								Started round	Final position / round	First match	Last match
Competition	G	W	D	L	GF	GA	GD	Win %	Started round	Final position / round	First match	Last match
Botola	30	15	10	5	56	36	+20	50.00	—N/a	Runner-up	25 August 2018	9 June 2019
Throne Cup	4	3	1	0	6	2	+4	75.00	Round of 32	Semi-finals	2 September 2018	3 November 2018
2018 CAF Confederation Cup	10	8	0	2	21	5	+16	80.00	Group stage	Winners	18 July 2018	2 December 2018
2018–19 CAF Confederation Cup (Note: Title holders (TH): Usually, the association of the title holders is not allowed to enter more than the eligible number of teams according to the CAF 5-Year Ranking (Regulations IV. 5). However, due to the transitional calendar where the 2018–19 CAF Confederation Cup began before the 2018 CAF Confederation Cup Final, the identity of the title holders was not known at the time of the draw. As a result, it was decided that the association of the title holders would be allowed exceptionally to enter a third team for this season. As Raja won the 2018 CAF Confederation Cup, they entered the competition and received a bye to the first round..)	10	3	5	2	14	8	+6	30.00	First round	Group stage	16 December 2018	17 March 2019
CAF Super Cup	1	1	0	0	2	1	+1	100.00	Final	Winners	29 March 2019	
Arab Club Champions Cup	6	2	3	1	4	4	+0	33.33	First round	Quarter-finals	10 August 2018	8 February 2019
Total	61	32	19	10	103	53	+50	52.46				

Updated to match played 22 July 2022
Source: Competitions

=== Botola ===
==== League table ====
Pos	Team	Pld	W	D	L	GF	GA	GD	Pts	Qualification or relegation
1	Wydad Casablanca (C)	30	17	8	5	56	30	+26	59	Qualification for Champions League
2	Raja Casablanca	30	15	10	5	56	36	+20	55	Qualification for Champions League
3	Hassania Agadir	30	12	9	9	30	22	+8	45 (Note: Head-to-head: Hassania Agadir: 3 points, +2 GD; Olympic Safi: 3 points, −2 GD.)	Qualification for Confederation Cup
4	Olympic Safi	30	12	9	9	37	38	−1	45	Participation in Arab Club Champions Cup (Note: Wydad Casablanca and Raja Casablanca are also participated in the Arab Club Champions Cup.)
5	IR Tanger	30	9	13	8	27	30	−3	40	Participation in Arab Club Champions Cup

Source: frmf.ma
Rules for classification: 1) Points; 2) Head-to-head points; 3) Head-to-head goal difference; 4) Goal difference; 5) Goals scored; 6) Fair-play points; 7) Play-off.
(C) Champions

==== Results summary ====
Overall								Home						Away					
Pld	W	D	L	GF	GA	GD	Pts	W	D	L	GF	GA	GD	W	D	L	GF	GA	GD
30	15	10	5	56	36	+20	55	9	4	2	28	14	+14	6	6	3	28	22	+6

Last updated: 22 July 2022.
Source: Competitive matches

==== Result round by round ====
Round	1	2	3	4	5	6	7	8	9	10	11	12	13	14	15	16	17	18	19	20	21	22	23	24	25	26	27	28	29	30
Ground	H	A	A	H	A	H	A	H	A	H	A	H	A	H	A	A	H	H	A	H	A	H	A	H	A	H	A	H	A	H
Result	W	D	W	W	D	D	D	W	W	L	L	W	D	D	W	W	W	D	L	L	W	W	W	W	D	D	D	W	L	W
Position																														2

Updated to match(es) played on 9 June 2019. Source: Competitive matches
A = Away; H = Home; W = Win; D = Draw; L = Loss

==== Matches ====
25 August 2018 Round 1	Raja CA	6–0	Chabab Rif Al Hoceima	Casablanca
21:30	Rahimi (yellow card) 7' (goal) 34'; Alami 8' (yellow card) 15'; Iajour 56' 68'; Hadraf 81'; Boutayeb 83'		El Houasli (yellow card) 38' (yellow-red card) 61'; Varela (yellow card) 40'	Stadium: Stade Mohammed V Referee: Nabil Benrakia

17 November 2018 Round 2	Hassania Agadir	0–0	Raja CA	Agadir
15:00	Rami (yellow card) 58'; Chaouch (yellow card) 60'		Bouain (yellow card) 88'; Iajour (yellow card) 90+1'	Stadium: Stade Adrar; Referee: Adil Zaourak

26 December 2018 Round 3	Youssoufia Berrechid	1–2	Raja CA	Berrechid
15:00	Naciri 53'		Benhalib 8'; Haddad (yellow card) 44'; Douik (yellow card) 83'; Rahimi (yellow card) 88'; Iajour 90'	Stadium: Stade Municipal de Berrechid; Referee: Samir Guezzaz

23 January 2019 Round 4	Raja CA	2–1	AS FAR	Marrakesh
15:00	Iajour 40'; Nanah 70'; Achchakir (yellow card) 62'; El Wardi (yellow card) 81'		El Yousfi (yellow card) 30'; Belmaalem (yellow card) 36'; Khaba 38' (yellow card) 65'; Berrahma (yellow card) 90+1'	Stadium: Stade de Marrakech; Referee: Hicham Tiazi

20 October 2018 Round 5	Olympique Khouribga	1–1	Raja CA	Khouribga
16:00	Kalai (yellow card) 81'; Hajhouj 90+1' (pen.)		Niasse 5'	Stadium: Complexe OCP; Referee: Mohamed Bellote

30 December 2018 Round 6	Raja CA	1–1	RSB Berkane	Casablanca
15:00	Bahi (yellow card) 22'; Benoun (red card) 69'; Rahimi (yellow card) 79'; Zniti (yellow card) 89'; Benhalib 90+7' (pen.)		Namsaoui (yellow card) 18'; Dayo (yellow card) 32'; Hilali (yellow card) 45'; Fo-Doh Laba 51'; El Kess (yellow card) 90+3'	Stadium: Stade Père Jégo; Referee: Mohamed El Allam

7 November 2018 Round 7	IR Tanger	1–1	Raja CA	Tanger
18:00	El Ghrib 45'; El Ouadi (yellow card) 46'; Arjoune (yellow card) 56'; Najdi (yellow card) 89'		Haddad (yellow card) 25'; Hafidi (yellow card) 63' (goal) 79'	Stadium: Stade Ibn Batouta; Referee: Taoufik Gourar

11 November 2018 Round 8	Raja CA	2–0	Kawkab Marrakech	Casablanca
15:00	Benoun 2' (pen.) (yellow card) 25'; Hafidi 30'; Niasse (yellow card) 20'; Douik (yellow card) 44'; Boutayeb (yellow card) 55'		Lahlali (yellow card) 66'	Stadium: Stade Père Jégo; Referee: Abderrahim Yaacoubi

20 February 2019 Round 9	Olympic Safi	0–1	Raja CA	Safi
17:00	Boua (yellow card) 60'		Benhalib (yellow card) 57'; Rahimi (yellow card) 82' (goal) 90+6'	Stadium: Stade El Massira; Referee: Mohamed Nhayeh

6 January 2019 Round 10	Raja CA	0–1	Wydad Athletic Club	Marrakesh
14:00	Bahi (yellow card) 40'; Haddad (yellow card) 42'; Rahimi (yellow card) 82'; Hafidi (red card) 82'	a	El Haddad 78'; Saidi (yellow card) 84'; El Hassouni (yellow card) 90+4'; Nahiri (yellow card) 48' (yellow-red card) 90+4'	Stadium: Stade de Marrakech; Referee: Redouane Jiyed

7 December 2018 Round 11	FUS Rabat	1–0	Raja CA	Rabat
17:30	Benarif 17' (yellow card) 58'; Skouma (yellow card) 66'; El Bassil (yellow card) 74'; Ettourabi (yellow card) 75'; Saidi (yellow card) 77' (yellow-red card) 81'			Stadium: Prince Moulay Abdellah Stadium; Referee: Hicham Tiazi

19 December 2018 Round 12	Raja CA	3–2	Rapide Oued Zem	Casablanca
20:00	Iajour 20'; Jabroun 45' (pen.); Benoun (yellow card) 47'; Hadraf 50'; Achchakir (yellow card) 53'; Benhalib (yellow card) 76'; Mabidi (yellow card) 83'; Dinda (yellow card) 86'		Coulibaly (yellow card) 17'; Boudali (yellow card) 28' (goal) 29'; El Aroui (yellow card) 44'; Blé (yellow card) 47'; Jaaouani (yellow card) 48'; Barki (yellow card) 69'; Tahloucht (red card) 78'; Diarra 90+4'	Stadium: Stade Mohammed V Referee: Taoufik Gourar

2 January 2019 Round 13	Mouloudia Oujda	1–1	Raja CA	Oujda
15:00	Ijroten 49'; Karkache (yellow card) 51'; Halhoul (yellow card) 66'; Karisa (yellow card) 86'		Douik (yellow card) 20'; Al Warfali (yellow card) 31'; Iajour 90' (yellow card) 90+1'	Stadium: Honneur Stadium; Referee: Jamal Belbassri

17 January 2019 Round 14	Raja CA	1–1	Moghreb Tétouan	Casablanca
15:00	Boutayeb (yellow card) 57'; Hafidi 67'; Jabroun (yellow card) 90+3'		Bellaaroussi 63'; Makahasi (yellow card) 76'	Stadium: Stade Père Jégo; Referee: Adil Zaourak

30 January 2019 Round 15	Difaâ El Jadidi	2–4	Raja CA	El Jadida
18:00	El Maftoul 41'; Msuva 76'; Karnass (yellow card) 40'		Iajour 7', 83', 90' (yellow card) 44'; Niasse 54'; Achchakir (yellow card) 79'	Stadium: Stade El Abdi; Referee: Redouane Jiyed

10 April 2019 Round 16	Chabab Rif Al Hoceima	1–2	Raja CA	Al Hoceima
17:00	Khadrouf 69' (pen.); Abdelghani (yellow card) 90+2'		Boutayeb 33'; Iajour 36'; Nanah (yellow card) 65'; Zniti (yellow card) 67'; Ngah (yellow card) 77'; Jabroun (yellow card) 90'	Stadium: Stade Mimoun Al Arsi; Referee: Hicham Tiazi

24 April 2019 Round 17	Raja CA	2–1	Hassania Agadir	Casablanca
18:00	Iajour 67'; Ngah 84'; Nanah (red card) 87'; Benoun (yellow card) 90'		El Berkaoui 63'; Qasmi (yellow card) 66' (yellow-red card) 71'; Baadi (yellow card) 87'	Stadium: Stade Père Jégo; Referee: Daki Radad

17 February 2019 Round 18	Raja CA	3–3	Youssoufia Berrechid	Casablanca
15:00	Rahimi 11' (yellow card) 62'; Benhalib 54'; Niasse (yellow card) 67'; Nanah 90+2'		Sadil (yellow card) 41'; Fati (yellow card) 55'; El Fakih 72' (pen.); Wakili 84'; Ayat Ahmed 87'	Stadium: Stade Père Jégo; Referee: Abderrahim Yaacoubi

27 February 2019 Round 19	AS FAR	2–1	Raja CA	Rabat
18:00	Luvumbu 41'; Kaaouach (yellow card) 67' (yellow-red card) 71'; Safsafi (yellow card) 83'; Berrahma 90+3'		Iajour 17'; Benoun (yellow card) 27'; Hafidi (yellow card) 69'; Rahimi (yellow card) 80'; Lakohal (yellow card) 90+3'	Stadium: Prince Moulay Abdellah Stadium; Referee: Gehad Grisha (Egypt)

6 March 2019 Round 20	Raja CA	2–3	Olympique Khouribga	Berrechid
15:00	Hafidi 23'; Nanah 87'; Mabidi (yellow card) 37'		Hachadi 38', 77' (yellow card) 89'; Hajhouj 41'; Koumya (yellow card) 43'; Kalai (yellow card) 74'; Askri (yellow card) 82'; Jamaoui (yellow card) 90+1'	Stadium: Stade Municipal de Berrechid; Referee: Samir Guezzaz

13 March 2019 Round 21	RSB Berkane	3–7	Raja CA	Berkane
16:00	Hilali 6'; Fo-Doh Laba 15'; Namsaoui (yellow card) 68'; Ouidar (yellow card) 74'; Mohamed 84'		Hadraf 10', 49', 59'; Benoun 57' (pen.); Boutayeb 64'; Iajour 71', 87'	Stadium: Stade Municipal de Berkane; Referee: Redouane Jiyed

17 April 2019 Round 22	Raja CA	1–0	IR Tanger	Casablanca
17:00	Hadraf 49'; Achchakir (yellow card) 74'			Stadium: Stade Père Jégo; Referee: Yassin Bouslim

3 April 2019 Round 23	Kawkab Marrakech	1–2	Raja CA	Marrakesh
20:00	El Hany (yellow card) 29'; Agouzoul 79'		Nanah 62'; Iajour 74' (pen.); Ngah (yellow card) 83'; Rahimi (yellow card) 89'	Stadium: Stade de Marrakech; Referee: Abderrahim Yaacoubi

7 April 2019 Round 24	Raja CA	1–0	Olympic Safi	Casablanca
17:00	Ouattara 58' (o.g.); Achchakir (yellow card) 60'; Boutayeb (yellow card) 80'; Niasse (yellow card) 90'		Lahlali (yellow card) 43'; Sabbar (yellow card) 30' (yellow-red card) 87'; Attouchi (yellow card) 90'	Stadium: Stade Père Jégo; Referee: Taoufik Gourar

21 April 2019 Round 25	Wydad Athletic Club	2–2	Raja CA	Marrakesh
17:00	El Karti 13'; Babatunde (yellow card) 13'; Saidi 46' (yellow card) 88'; Jabrane (yellow card) 50'; Noussair (yellow card) 77'		Achchakir (yellow card) 10'; Rahimi 21'; Iajour 72'	Stadium: Stade de Marrakech; Attendance: 30,000; Referee: Youssef Haraoui

28 April 2019 Round 26	Raja CA	0–0	FUS Rabat	Casablanca
17:00	Iajour (yellow card) 17'; El Wardi (yellow card) 42'; Douik (yellow card) 59'; Benhalib (yellow card) 70'		Diakité (yellow card) 18'; Ait Khorsa (yellow card) 55'; Ennaffati (yellow card) 55' (yellow-red card) 84'; Louadni (yellow card) 78'	Stadium: Stade Père Jégo; Referee: Adil Zaourak

4 May 2019 Round 27	Rapide Oued Zem	3–3	Raja CA	Oued Zem
17:00	Diarra 7'; El Aroui 10'; Ouchouia 61'; Barki (yellow card) 19'; Jaaouani (yellow card) 84'		Rahimi 3', 30'; Hadraf 51'	Stadium: Stade Municipal; Referee: Abderrahim Yaacoubi

11 May 2019 Round 28	Raja CA	2–1	Mouloudia Oujda	Casablanca
00:00	Iajour 63', 79'; Douik (yellow card) 84'		Jefferson da Silva 49'; Karkache (yellow card) 53'; Okagbue (yellow card) 76'	Stadium: Stade Père Jégo; Referee: Nabil Berquia

4 June 2019 Round 29	Moghreb Tétouan	3–1	Raja CA	Tétouan
:	El Maimouni 36' (pen.) (yellow card) 71'; Hawassi 55'; Halfi 87' (yellow card) 88'; Bouchatta (yellow card) 75'; Bounaga (yellow card) 69'; Lakhal (yellow card) 82'		Hadraf 22'; El Wardi (yellow card) 34'	Stadium: Stade Saniat Rmel; Referee: Redouane Jiyed

9 June 2019 Round 30	Raja CA	2–0	Difaâ El Jadidi	Casablanca
20:00	Benhalib 36'; Iajour 75'		Aguerdoum (red card) 44'	Stadium: Stade Mohammed V Referee: Mohamed Nhayeh

=== Moroccan Throne Cup ===
2 September 2018 Round of 32	Chabab Atlas Khénifra	0–1	Raja CA	Khenifra
17:00			Hafidi 74'	Stadium: Stade municipal de Khénifra; Referee: Abderrahim El Yaaqoubi
Note: Lineup for Raja CA - Zniti, Benoun, Boutayeb, Haddad, Achchakir, Mabidi (Hadraf 61'), Niasse, Rahimi, Iajour (Chaabane 81'), Hafidi, Benhalib (Bahi 78').

12 September 2018 Round of 16	Raja CA	3–1	KAC Kénitra	Casablanca
20:00	Iajour 14'; Hafidi 50'; Benhalib 69' (pen.)		Oumarou 38'	Stadium: Stade Mohammed V Referee: Abdelouahed Fatihi
Note: Lineup for Raja CA - Zniti, Benoun, Boutayeb, Haddad (Bahi 65'), Jbira, Hafidi, Niasse, Achchakir, Iajour (Hadraf 76'), Alami (Rahimi 64'), Benhalib.

7 October 2018 Quarter-finals	Rapide Oued Zem	0–1	Raja CA	Oued Zem
19:00			Benoun 22'	Stadium: Stade municipal de Oued Zem; Referee: Adil Zaourak
Note: Lineup for Raja CA - Zniti, Benoun, Al Warfali, Dinda, Boutayeb, Niasse (Haddad 90+8'), Bahi (Jabroun 79'), Achchakir, Mabidi, Iajour (Jbira 87'), Rahimi.

3 November 2018 Semi-finals	Wydad de Fès	1–1 (a.e.t.) (4–3 p)	Raja CA	Tangier
17:00	Baalla 76'		Hafidi 20'	Stadium: Stade Ibn Batouta; Referee: Hicham Tiazi
Note: Lineup for Raja CA - Zniti, Al Warfali, Jbira (Dinda 89'), Boutayeb, Achchakir (Benhalib 90+3'), Niasse, Mabidi (Jabroun 72'), Hadraf (Bahi 65'), Hafidi, Iajour, Rahimi.

=== 2018 Confederation Cup ===
==== Group A ====
Pos	Team	Pld	W	D	L	GF	GA	GD	Pts	Qualification	RCA	VIT	ASE	ADU
1	(Morocco) Raja Casablanca	6	3	2	1	14	5	+9	11	Quarter-finals	—	0–0	4–0	6–0
2	(Democratic Republic of the Congo) AS Vita Club	6	3	1	2	8	5	+3	10	Quarter-finals	2–0	—	3–1	2–0
3	(Ivory Coast) ASEC Mimosas	6	3	0	3	6	8	−2	9		0–1	2–0	—	1–0
4	(Ghana) Aduana Stars	6	1	1	4	5	15	−10	4		3–3	2–1	0–2	—

Source: CAF

18 July 2018 Matchday 3	ASEC Mimosas (Ivory Coast)	0–1	(Morocco) Raja CA	Abidjan
16:00 UTC+0		Report	Benhalib 74' (pen.)	Stadium: Stade Félix Houphouët-Boigny; Attendance: 8,000; Referee: Mohamed Maarouf (Egypt)

29 July 2018 Matchday 4	Raja CA (Morocco)	4–0	(Ivory Coast) ASEC Mimosas	Casablanca
20:00 UTC+1	Benhalib 18', 62' (pen.); Hadraf 27', 45+1'	Report		Stadium: Stade Mohammed V Attendance: 32 000; Referee: Sékou Ahmed Touré (Guinea)

19 August 2018 Matchday 5	AS Vita Club (Democratic Republic of the Congo)	2–0	(Morocco) Raja CA	Kinshasa
14:00 UTC+1	Ngoma 50'; Mundele 59'	Report		Stadium: Stade des Martyrs; Referee: Hassan Mohamed Hagi (Somalia)

29 August 2018 Matchday 6	Raja CA (Morocco)	6–0	(Ghana) Aduana Stars	Casablanca
20:00 UTC+1	Iajour 3', 15'; Hadraf 30'; Rahimi 33'; Benhalib 67', 82'	Report		Stadium: Stade Mohammed V Referee: Juste Ephrem Zio (Burkina Faso)

==== Knockout stage ====
===== Quarter-finals =====
16 September 2018 First leg	CARA Brazzaville (Republic of the Congo)	1–2	(Morocco) Raja CA	Brazzaville
14:00 UTC+1	Kivutuka 71'	Report	Rahimi 47'; Benhalib 80'	Stadium: Stade Alphonse Massemba-Débat; Referee: Davies Omweno (Kenya)

23 September 2018 Second leg	Raja CA (Morocco)	1–0	(Republic of the Congo) CARA Brazzaville	Casablanca
17:00 UTC+1	Iajour 4'	Report		Stadium: Stade Mohammed V Attendance: 55,000; Referee: Jean-Jacques Ndala Ngambo (DR Congo)

===== Semi-finals =====
3 October 2018 First leg	Enyimba (Nigeria)	0–1	(Morocco) Raja CA	Aba
14:00 UTC+1		Report	Hafidi 48'	Stadium: Enyimba International Stadium; Referee: Youssef Essrayri (Tunisia)

24 October 2018 Second leg	Raja CA (Morocco)	2–1	(Nigeria) Enyimba	Casablanca
20:00 UTC+1	Hadraf 45+1'; Oladuntoye 88' (o.g.)	Report	Bashir 89'	Stadium: Stade Mohammed V Referee: Eric Otogo-Castane (Gabon)

===== Final =====
25 November 2018 First leg	Raja CA (Morocco)	3–0	(Democratic Republic of the Congo) AS Vita Club	Casablanca
20:00 UTC+1	Rahimi 47', 61'; Benhalib 66' (pen.)	Report		Stadium: Stade Mohammed V Attendance: 45,000; Referee: Maguette N'Diaye (Senegal)

2 December 2018 Second leg	AS Vita Club (Democratic Republic of the Congo)	3–1	(Morocco) Raja CA	Kinshasa
20:00 UTC+1	Mundele 45+4'; Batezadio 71'; Ngoma 74'	Report	Hafidi 21'	Stadium: Stade des Martyrs; Attendance: 75,000; Referee: Victor Gomes (South Africa)

=== CAF Super Cup ===
29 March 2019	Espérance de Tunis (Tunisia)	1–2	(Morocco) Raja CA	Al Rayyan
19:00 UTC+3	Belaïli 57'	Report	Hafidi 22'; Banoun 64'	Stadium: Thani bin Jassim Stadium; Referee: Bamlak Tessema Weyesa (Ethiopia)

=== 2018–19 Confederation Cup ===
==== First round ====
16 December 2018 First leg	Raja CA (Morocco)	5–0	(Gabon) Cercle Mbéri Sportif	Casablanca
17:00 UTC+1	Banoun 52'; Benhalib 58'; Achchakir 68' (pen.); Soumahoro 84' (o.g.); Shaban 88'	Report		Stadium: Stade Mohammed V Referee: Ibrahim Nour El Din (Egypt)

22 December 2018 Second leg	Cercle Mbéri Sportif (Gabon)	1–0	(Morocco) Raja CA	Libreville
15:30 UTC+1	Nono 41'	Report		Stadium: Stade Augustin Monédan de Sibang; Referee: Lazard Tsiba (Congo)

==== Play-off round ====
12 January 2019 First leg	African Stars (Namibia)	1–1	(Morocco) Raja CA	Windhoek
16:00 UTC+2	Handura 42'	Report	Rahimi 49'	Stadium: Sam Nujoma Stadium; Referee: Antoine Effa (Cameroon)

20 January 2019 Second leg	Raja CA (Morocco)	1–0	(Namibia) African Stars	Marrakesh
17:00 UTC+1	Banoun 56'	Report		Stadium: Stade de Marrakech; Referee: Beida Dahane (Mauritania)

==== Group stage ====
===== Group A =====
Pos	Team	Pld	W	D	L	GF	GA	GD	Pts	Qualification	RSB	HAS	RCA	ASO
1	(Morocco) RS Berkane	6	3	2	1	10	5	+5	11	Quarter-finals	—	2–1	0–0	3–0
2	(Morocco) Hassania Agadir	6	2	2	2	5	5	0	8	Quarter-finals	1–0	—	1–1	2–1
3	(Morocco) Raja Casablanca	6	1	4	1	7	6	+1	7		2–4	0–0	—	0–0
4	(Republic of the Congo) AS Otohô	6	1	2	3	4	10	−6	5		1–1	1–0	1–4	—

Source: CAF

3 February 2019 Matchday 1	Hassania Agadir (Morocco)	1–1	(Morocco) Raja CA	Agadir
17:00 UTC+1	Oubila 63'	Report	Iajour 54'	Stadium: Stade Adrar; Referee: Bienvenu Sinko (Ivory Coast)

13 February 2019 Matchday 2	Raja CA (Morocco)	0–0	(Republic of the Congo) AS Otohô	Rabat
17:00 UTC+1		Report		Stadium: Prince Moulay Abdellah Stadium; Referee: Sékou Ahmed Touré (Guinea)

24 February 2019 Matchday 3	Raja CA (Morocco)	2–4	(Morocco) RS Berkane	Rabat
17:00 UTC+1	Iajour 60', 78'	Report	Fiddi 10' (o.g.); Laba 52', 84'; Farehane 64'	Stadium: Prince Moulay Abdellah Stadium; Referee: Issa Sy (Senegal)

3 March 2019 Matchday 4	RS Berkane (Morocco)	0–0	(Morocco) Raja CA	Berkane
20:00 UTC+1		Report		Stadium: Stade Municipal de Berkane; Referee: Antoine Effa (Cameroon)

10 March 2019 Matchday 5	Raja CA (Morocco)	0–0	(Morocco) Hassania Agadir	Rabat
17:00 UTC+1		Report		Stadium: Prince Moulay Abdellah Stadium; Referee: Youssef Essrayri (Tunisia)

17 March 2019 Matchday 6	AS Otohô (Republic of the Congo)	1–4	(Morocco) Raja CA	Owando
14:00 UTC+1	Bissiki 16'	Report	Benhalib 41'; Al Ouarfali 44'; Nanah 64'; Iajour 87'	Stadium: Stade Omnisport Marien Ngouabi d'Owando; Referee: Bakary Gassama (Gambia)

=== Arab Club Champions Cup ===
==== First round ====
10 August 2018 First leg	Salam Zgharta (Lebanon)	1–2	(Morocco) Raja CA	Zgharta
17:00 UTC+3	Nias 43'	Report	Iajour 64'; Boutayeb 84'	Stadium: Zgharta Stadium; Referee: Sadok Selmi (Tunisia)
Note: Lineup for Raja CA - Zniti, Benoun, Jbira, Boutayeb, Haddad (Al Ouarfali 55'), Achchakir, Alami (Hafidi 55'), Niasse, Rahimi, Iajour, Benhalib.

29 September 2018 Second leg	Raja CA (Morocco)	1–1	(Lebanon) Salam Zgharta	Casablanca
19:00 UTC+1	Hadraf 51'	Report	Nias 90+2'	Stadium: Stade Mohammed V Referee: Mahmoud El Banna (Egypt)

==== Second round ====
29 October 2018 First leg	Ismaily (Egypt)	0–0	(Morocco) Raja CA	Ismailia
19:00 UTC+2		Report		Stadium: Ismailia Stadium; Referee: Ali Shaban (Kuwait)

11 December 2018 Second leg	Raja CA (Morocco)	0–0 (4–2 p)	(Egypt) Ismaily	Casablanca
20:00 UTC+1		Report		Stadium: Stade Mohammed V Referee: Ahmed Al Kaf (Oman)
	Penalties
	Hafidi (penalty missed); Banoun (penalty scored); Rahimi (penalty scored); Achchakir (penalty scored); Hadraf (penalty scored)		(penalty missed) Abd Rabo; (penalty missed) Taha; (penalty scored) El Wahsh; (penalty scored) El Mohamady

==== Quarter-finals ====
26 January 2019 First leg	Raja CA (Morocco)	0–2	(Tunisia) Étoile du Sahel	Rabat
17:00 UTC+1			Msakni 57'; Ben Larbi 90'	Stadium: Prince Moulay Abdellah Stadium; Referee: Gehad Grisha (Egypt)
Note: Lineup for Raja CA - Bouamira, Haddad (Hafidi 62'), Benoun, Boutayeb, Ngah, Niasse, Achchakir, Nanah, Hadraf, Rahimi, Iajour.

8 February 2019 Second leg	Étoile du Sahel (Tunisia)	0–1	(Morocco) Raja CA	Sousse
15:00 UTC+1			Iajour 29'	Stadium: Stade Olympique de Sousse; Referee: Mohanad Qassim (Iraq)
Note: Lineup for Raja CA - Zniti, Al Warfali, Benoun, Ngah (Douik 75'), Achchakir, Niasse, Hafidi (Jabroun 82'), Nanah, Hadraf, Iajour, Rahimi.

== Squad information ==
=== Playing statistics ===
No.	Pos	Nat	Player	Total		Botola		Throne Cup		Confederation Cup		CAF Super Cup		Arab Club Champions	
No.	Pos	Nat	Player	Apps	Goals	Apps	Goals	Apps	Goals	Apps	Goals	Apps	Goals	Apps	Goals
Goalkeepers
1	GK	(Morocco) MAR	Anas Zniti	46	0	23	0	4	0	16	0	1	0	2	0
22	GK	(Morocco) MAR	Mohamed Bouamira	9	0	8	0	0	0	0	0	0	0	1	0
12	GK	(Morocco) MAR	Mohamed Chennouf	0	0	0	0	0	0	0	0	0	0	0	0
Defenders
13	DF	(Morocco) MAR	Badr Benoun	42	4	20	2	3	1	15	0	1	1	3	0
8	DF	(Libya) LBY	Sanad Al Warfali	28	1	11	0	2	0	12	1	1	0	2	0
26	DF	(Morocco) MAR	Ilias Haddad	27	0	20	0	3	0	2	0	0	0	2	0
	DF	(Morocco) MAR	Mohamed Oulhaj	2	0	1	0	0	0	1	0	0	0	0	0
	DF	(Mali) MLI	Salif Coulibaly	1	0	0	0	1	0	0	0	0	0	0	0
6	DF	(Morocco) MAR	Saad Lakohal	8	0	4	0	0	0	4	0	0	0	0	0
5	DF	(Cameroon) CMR	Fabrice Ngah	27	1	18	1	0	0	6	0	1	0	2	0
20	DF	(Morocco) MAR	Abdeljalil Jbira	16	0	4	0	3	0	8	0	0	0	1	0
	DF	(Morocco) MAR	Mohamed Aymen Sadil	0	0	0	0	0	0	0	0	0	0	0	0
	DF	(Gabon) GAB	Muller Dinda	10	0	8	0	2	0	0	0	0	0	0	0
	DF	(Morocco) MAR	Mohamed Erroutbi	0	0	0	0	0	0	0	0	0	0	0	0
	DF	(Morocco) MAR	Zakaria Drouich	0	0	0	0	0	0	0	0	0	0	0	0
25	DF	(Morocco) MAR	Omar Boutayeb	36	4	16	3	4	0	13	0	1	0	2	1
4	DF	(Morocco) MAR	Mohamed Douik	27	0	20	0	0	0	6	0	0	0	1	0
3	DF	(Morocco) MAR	Imrane Fiddi	8	0	7	0	0	0	1	0	0	0	0	0
Midfielders
2	MF	(Morocco) MAR	Abderrahim Achchakir	44	0	23	0	4	0	13	0	1	0	3	0
19	MF	(Senegal) SEN	Baye Ibrahima Niasse	33	2	14	2	4	0	12	0	0	0	3	0
23	MF	(Morocco) MAR	Salaheddine Bahi	23	0	9	0	4	0	10	0	0	0	0	0
	MF	(Morocco) MAR	Mohamed Zrida	1	0	1	0	0	0	0	0	0	0	0	0
14	MF	(Democratic Republic of the Congo) COD	Lema Mabidi	24	0	13	0	3	0	8	0	0	0	0	0
17	MF	(Morocco) MAR	Zakaria El Wardi	20	0	16	0	0	0	3	0	1	0	0	0
	MF	(Morocco) MAR	Ayoub Khairi	3	0	3	0	0	0	0	0	0	0	0	0
	MF	(Morocco) MAR	Mouad Mouchtanim	2	0	2	0	0	0	0	0	0	0	0	0
	MF	(Morocco) MAR	Hassan Bouain	4	0	4	0	0	0	0	0	0	0	0	0
18	MF	(Morocco) MAR	Abdelilah Hafidi	32	10	12	4	3	3	13	2	1	1	3	0
10	MF	(Morocco) MAR	Saifeddine Alami	14	1	8	1	1	0	4	0	0	0	1	0
Forwards
7	FW	(Morocco) MAR	Zakaria Hadraf	45	12	24	8	3	0	15	4	1	0	2	0
21	FW	(Morocco) MAR	Soufiane Rahimi	50	10	26	6	4	0	16	4	1	0	3	0
24	FW	(Morocco) MAR	Mahmoud Benhalib	39	13	22	4	3	1	12	8	1	0	1	0
11	FW	(Morocco) MAR	Anas Jabroun	29	1	20	1	2	0	6	0	0	0	1	0
	FW	(Morocco) MAR	Hicham Islah	0	0	0	0	0	0	0	0	0	0	0	0
	FW	(Morocco) MAR	Zakaria Habti	0	0	0	0	0	0	0	0	0	0	0	0
30	FW	(Morocco) MAR	Ayoub Nanah	25	5	16	4	0	0	6	1	1	0	2	0
9	FW	(Morocco) MAR	Mouhssine Iajour	48	29	26	19	4	1	14	7	1	0	3	2
28	FW	(Uganda) UGA	Muhammad Shaban	8	0	5	0	1	0	2	0	0	0	0	0
Players transferred out during the season
	FW	(Morocco) MAR	Hamid Ahadad	1	0	0	0	1	0	0	0	0	0	0	0

Last updated: 1 August 2022

=== Goalscorers ===
Includes all competitive matches. The list is sorted alphabetically by surname when total goals are equal.

No.	Nat.	Player	Pos.	B	TC	CC 3	CSC	ACC	TOTAL
1	(Morocco)	Mouhcine Iajour	FW	19	1	7	0	2	29
2	(Morocco)	Mahmoud Benhalib	FW	4	1	9	0	0	14
3	(Morocco)	Zakaria Hadraf	FW	8	0	4	0	1	13
4	(Morocco)	Soufiane Rahimi	FW	6	0	5	0	0	11
5	(Morocco)	Abdelilah Hafidi	MF	4	3	2	1	0	10
8	(Morocco)	Badr Benoun	DF	2	1	2	1	0	6
6	(Morocco)	Ayoub Nanah	FW	4	0	1	0	0	5
7	(Morocco)	Omar Boutayeb	DF	3	0	0	0	1	4
9	(Senegal)	Baye Ibrahima Niasse	MF	2	0	0	0	0	2
10	(Cameroon)	Fabrice Ngah	DF	1	0	0	0	0	1
11	(Morocco)	Anas Jabroun	FW	1	0	0	0	0	1
12	(Morocco)	Saifeddine Alami	MF	1	0	0	0	0	1
13	(Libya)	Sanad Al Warfali	DF	0	0	1	0	0	1
14	(Morocco)	Abderrahim Chakir	MF	0	0	1	0	0	1
15	(Uganda)	Muhammad Shaban	FW	0	0	1	0	0	1
Own Goals				1	0	2	0	0	3
Totals				56	6	35	2	4	103
