= 2019–20 Raja CA season =

Raja CA
2019–20 season
- President: Jawad Ziyat
- Manager: Patrice Carteron (until 11 November 2019); Jamal Sellami (from 12 November 2019)
- Stadium: Stade Mohamed V
- Botola: Winners
- Throne Cup: Round of 32
- CAF Champions League: Semi-finals
- Arab Club Champions Cup: Winners
- Top goalscorer: League: Soufiane Rahimi (10 goals); All: Mohsine Moutouali (15 goals)
Home colours	Away colours	Third colours

The 2019–20 season is Raja CA's 71st season in existence and the club's 63rd consecutive season in the top flight of Moroccan football. They competing in Botola, the Throne Cup, CAF Champions League and Arab Club Champions Cup. The season started on 14 September 2019, and was scheduled to end on 1 July 2020. However, the season was suspended in March 2020, due to COVID-19 pandemic in Morocco, then resumed in July and ended in 11 October 2020.

== Squad list ==
Players and squad numbers last updated on 31 August 2019.
Note: Flags indicate national team as has been defined under FIFA eligibility rules. Players may hold more than one non-FIFA nationality.

No.	Name	Nat.	Position	Date of birth (age)	Signed from
Goalkeepers
1	Anas Zniti	(Morocco)	GK	28 October 1988 (aged 29)	(Morocco) AS FAR
82	Mohamed Bouamira	(Morocco)	GK	21 February 1988 (aged 30)	(Morocco) Chabab Rif Al Hoceima
12	Amir El Haddaoui	(Morocco)	GK	14 September 1999 (aged 19)	(Morocco) Youth system
Defenders
26	Ilias Haddad	(Morocco)	CB	1 March 1989 (aged 30)	(Morocco) AS FAR
NA	Salif Coulibaly	(Mali)	CB	13 May 1988 (aged 31)	(Egypt) Al Ahly SC
8	Sanad Al Warfali	(Libya)	CB	17 May 1992 (aged 27)	(Libya) Al Ahli SC
13	Badr Benoun	(Morocco)	CB	30 September 1993 (aged 25)	(Morocco) Youth system
25	Omar Boutayeb	(Morocco)	RB	19 April 1994 (aged 25)	(Morocco) Youth system
29	Abdelilah Madkour	(Morocco)	RB	11 June 2000 (aged 19)	(Morocco) Youth system
20	Abdeljalil Jbira	(Morocco)	LB	14 March 1990 (aged 29)	(Morocco) Kawkab Marrakech
4	Fabrice Ngah	(Cameroon)	LB	16 October 1997 (aged 21)	(Morocco) Difaâ Hassani El Jadidi
2	Mohamed Douik	(Morocco)	RB	1 March 1999 (aged 20)	(Morocco) Youth system
NA	Zakaria Driouch	(Morocco)	LB	11 January 2001 (aged 18)	(Morocco) Youth system
47	Oussama Soukhane	(Morocco)	LB	11 January 1999 (aged 20)	(Morocco) Youth system
Midfielders
19	Mohamed Zrida	(Morocco)	DM	1 February 1999 (aged 20)	(Morocco) Youth system
55	Abderrahim Achchakir	(Morocco)	DM	15 December 1986 (aged 32)	(Morocco) AS FAR
16	Omar Arjoune	(Morocco)	DM	1 February 1996 (aged 23)	(Morocco) IR Tanger
23	Mohamed Al Makahasi	(Morocco)	CM	5 February 1995 (aged 24)	(Morocco) Moghreb Tétouan
6	Fabrice Ngoma	(Democratic Republic of the Congo)	CM	22 January 1994 (aged 25)	(Democratic Republic of the Congo) AS Vita Club
98	Zakaria El Wardi	(Morocco)	CM	17 August 1998 (aged 21)	(Morocco) Moghreb Tétouan
NA	Mouad Mouchtanim	(Morocco)	CM	19 January 1999 (aged 20)	(Morocco) Youth system
30	Ayoub Nanah	(Morocco)	SS	12 November 1992 (aged 26)	(Morocco) Difaâ Hassani El Jadidi
5	Mohsine Moutaouali	(Morocco)	AM / RW	3 March 1986 (aged 33)	(Qatar) Al Ahli SC
18	Abdelilah Hafidi	(Morocco)	AM	30 January 1992 (aged 27)	(Morocco) Youth system
Forwards
10	Mahmoud Benhalib	(Morocco)	LW	23 March 1996 (aged 23)	(Morocco) Youth system
9	Ben Malango	(Democratic Republic of the Congo)	ST	10 November 1993 (aged 25)	(Democratic Republic of the Congo) TP Mazembe
35	Youssef Bekkari	(Morocco)		30 November 1999 (aged 19)	(Morocco) Youth system
17	Hamid Ahadad	(Morocco)	ST	30 November 1994 (aged 24)	(Egypt) Zamalek SC
14	Zakaria Habti	(Morocco)	RW	6 February 1998 (aged 21)	(Morocco) Youth system
11	Anas Jabroun	(Morocco)	LW	7 October 1997 (aged 21)	(Morocco) Moghreb Tétouan
21	Soufiane Rahimi	(Morocco)	LW	2 June 1996 (aged 23)	(Morocco) Étoile de Casablanca
NA	Hicham Islah	(Morocco)	RW	3 March 1999 (aged 20)	(Morocco) Youth system

== Transfers ==
=== In ===
Date	Pos	Player	From club	Transfer fee	Source
12 May 2019	FW	(Morocco) Mohsine Moutouali	(Qatar) Al Ahli SC	Free transfer	
14 May 2019	DF	(Mali) Salif Coulibaly	(Egypt) Al Ahly SC	Free transfer	
21 May 2019	MF	(Democratic Republic of the Congo) Fabrice Ngoma	(Democratic Republic of the Congo) AS Vita Club	Free transfer	
27 June 2019	MF	(Morocco) Omar Arjoune	IR Tanger	Free transfer	
30 June 2019	FW	(Morocco) Ayoub Sabiri	Union Sidi Kacem	Loan Return	
30 June 2019	DF	(Morocco) Mohamed Aymen Sadil	Youssoufia Berrechid	Loan Return	
30 June 2019	DF	(Morocco) Ayoub Joulale	JS Soualem	Loan Return	
30 June 2019	MF	(Morocco) Hassan Bouaïn	Maghreb de Fès	Loan Return	
30 June 2019	FW	(Morocco) Mâati Tamaizou	Stade Marocain	Loan Return	
24 July 2019	FW	(Morocco) Hamid Ahaddad	(Egypt) Zamalek SC	Loan for one year	
15 August 2019	FW	(Democratic Republic of the Congo) Ben Malango	(Democratic Republic of the Congo) TP Mazembe	Free transfer	
13 September 2019	DF	(Libya) Sanad Al Warfali	(Libya) Al Ahli SC	Free transfer	
14 January 2020	MF	(Morocco) Mohamed Al Makahasi	Moghreb Tétouan	Free transfer	

=== Out ===
Date	Pos	Player	To club	Transfer fee	Source
29 May 2019	FW	(Morocco) Zakaria Hadraf	(Saudi Arabia) Damac FC	Free transfer	
9 June 2019	MF	(Democratic Republic of the Congo) Lema Mabidi	Unattached (Note: Mabidi joined Sabail FK on 14 February 2020.)	Free transfer	
17 June 2019	MF	(Senegal) Baye Ibrahima Niasse	Unattached (Note: Niasse joined Gabala FK on 31 October 2019.)	Free transfer (Released)	
27 June 2019	DF	(Morocco) Mohamed Aymen Sadil	IR Tanger	Free transfer	
22 July 2019	FW	(Morocco) Mouhcine Iajour	(Saudi Arabia) Damac FC	Free transfer	
25 July 2019	MF	(Morocco) Salaheddine Bahi	AS FAR	Free transfer	
29 July 2019	FW	(Uganda) Muhammad Shaban	Unattached (Note: Shaban joined Vipers SC on 8 August 2019.)	Free transfer (Released)	
29 July 2019	GK	(Morocco) Mohammed Chenouf	Unattached	Free transfer (Released)	
3 August 2019	DF	(Morocco) Mohamed Oulhaj	Unattached	Free transfer	
15 August 2019	DF	(Morocco) Imrane Fiddi	AS Salé	Loan for one year	
15 August 2019	MF	(Morocco) Hassan Bouain	AS Salé	Loan for one year	
15 August 2019	DF	(Morocco) Saad Lakohal	Widad Témara	Loan for one year	
11 September 2019	DF	(Mali) Salif Coulibaly	Unattached (Note: Coulibaly joined Horoya AC on 23 January 2020.)	Free transfer (Released)	

== Pre-season and friendlies ==
14 July 2019 Friendly	Raja CA (Morocco)	0–1	(England) Oldham Athletic	Agadir
18:00				Stadium: Stade Adrar; Attendance: 0 (close doors)

17 July 2019 Friendly	Raja CA	7–0	CS Hilal Tarrast	Agadir
18:00	Haddad 9'; Islah 16'; Tamaizou 33', 35'; Nanah 36'; Jaadi 39'; Iajour 58'			Stadium: Stade Adrar; Attendance: 0 (close doors)

20 July 2019 Friendly	Raja CA	4–0	Olympique Khouribga	Agadir
18:00	Islah 5'; Madkour 27'; Ngoma 55', 59'			Stadium: Stade Adrar; Attendance: 0 (close doors)

23 July 2019 Friendly	Raja CA (Morocco)	0–0	(Spain) CD Leganés	Tangier
20:30				Stadium: Stade Ibn Batouta

27 July 2019 Friendly	Raja CA	2–0	AS Salé	Casablanca
11:00	Islah 19'; Mouchtanim 57'			Stadium: Raja-Oasis Sports Complex; Attendance: 0 (close doors)

30 July 2019 Friendly	Raja CA	1–0	Raja Beni Mellal	Casablanca
15:00	Ngah 86'			Stadium: Raja-Oasis Sports Complex; Attendance: 0 (close doors)

4 August 2019 Friendly	Raja CA (Morocco)	0–1	(Spain) Real Betis	Casablanca
20:00	El Wardi (yellow card) 41'	Report	Raúl García 88'	Stadium: Stade Mohammed V Referee: Noureddine Jaafari

== Competitions ==
=== Overview ===
Competition	Record								Started round	Final position / round	First match	Last match
Competition	G	W	D	L	GF	GA	GD	Win %	Started round	Final position / round	First match	Last match
Botola	30	17	9	4	43	23	+20	56.67	—N/a	Winners	24 October 2019	11 October 2020
Throne Cup	1	0	0	1	2	3	−1	0.00	Round of 32		31 August 2019	
CAF Champions League	14	6	4	4	20	14	+6	42.86	Preliminary round	Semi-finals	10 August 2019	4 November 2020
Arab Club Champions Cup	7	3	2	2	10	8	+2	42.86	First round	Winners	23 September 2019	16 February 2020
Total	52	26	15	11	75	48	+27	50.00				

Updated to match played 22 July 2022
Source: Competitions

=== Botola ===
==== League table ====
Pos	Team	Pld	W	D	L	GF	GA	GD	Pts	Qualification or relegation
1	Raja Casablanca (C, Q)	30	17	9	4	43	23	+20	60	Qualification for Champions League
2	Wydad Casablanca (Q)	30	17	8	5	52	28	+24	59	Qualification for Champions League
3	RS Berkane (Q)	30	15	12	3	35	23	+12	57	Qualification for Confederation Cup
4	FUS Rabat	30	13	10	7	39	30	+9	49	
5	Mouloudia Oujda	30	12	12	6	35	28	+7	48	

Updated to match(es) played on 11 October 2020. Source: frmf.ma
Rules for classification: 1) Points; 2) Head-to-head points; 3) Head-to-head goal difference; 4) Goal difference; 5) Goals scored; 6) Fair-play points; 7) Play-off.
(C) Champions; (Q) Qualified for the phase indicated

==== Results summary ====
Overall								Home						Away					
Pld	W	D	L	GF	GA	GD	Pts	W	D	L	GF	GA	GD	W	D	L	GF	GA	GD
30	17	9	4	43	23	+20	60	11	2	2	24	11	+13	6	7	2	19	12	+7

Last updated: 11 October 2020.
Source: Competitive matches

==== Result round by round ====
Round	1	2	3	4	5	6	7	8	9	10	11	12	13	14	15	16	17	18	19	20	21	22	23	24	25	26	27	28	29	30
Ground	H	A	A	H	A	H	A	H	A	H	A	H	A	H	A	A	H	H	A	H	A	H	A	H	A	H	A	H	A	H
Result	W	W	L	W	D	W	D	L	D	W	W	D	D	W	L	W	W	W	D	W	W	W	W	W	D	L	D	D	W	W
Position	1	2	1	3	4	3	2	4	3	3	3	3	3	3	4	5	4	2	2	2	1	1	1	1	1	1	1	1	1	1

Updated to match(es) played on 9 June 2019. Source: Competitive matches
A = Away; H = Home; W = Win; D = Draw; L = Loss

==== Matches ====
24 October 2019 Round 1	Raja CA	2–0	Raja Beni Mellal	Casablanca
17:00	Moutouali 20' (pen.); Arjoune (yellow card) 25'; Malango (yellow card) 32' (goal) 76'; Rahimi (yellow card) 78'		Ghirrane (yellow card) 22'; Allali (yellow card) 78'	Stadium: Stade Mohammed V Referee: Dakki Reddad

5 November 2019 Round 2	Renaissance Zemamra	1–2	Raja CA	Zemamra
15:00	El Mobaraky 74'		Malango 45+2'; Ahaddad 71'	Stadium: Stade Ahmed Chokri; Attendance: 0 (close doors); Referee: Mohamed Nhayeh

9 November 2019 Round 3	Youssoufia Berrechid	3–2	Raja CA	Berrechid
16:00	Luvumbu (yellow card) 13'; Chaina 34'; Al Hachimi 37' (yellow card) 58'; Taik (yellow card) 84'; Niani 92+3'		Achchakir (yellow card) 12'; Rahimi 28', 59'	Stadium: Stade Municipal de Berrechid; Referee: Karim Sabry

11 December 2019 Round 4	Raja CA	1–0	Moghreb Tétouan	Casablanca
19:00	Ngah (yellow card) 55'; Malango 63'		Sissoko (yellow card) 36' (yellow-red card) 43'; El Hasnaoui (yellow card) 82'; Ettorabi (yellow card) 85'	Stadium: Stade Mohammed V Referee: Adil Zourak

27 October 2019 Round 5	Olympic Club de Safi	0–0	Raja CA	Safi
15:00	Mouaoui (yellow card) 52'		Benoun (yellow card) 18'; Rahimi (yellow card) 26'	Stadium: Stade El Massira; Referee: Samir Kazaz

18 December 2019 Round 6	Raja CA	2–1	Hassania Agadir	Casablanca
17:00	Rahimi 17'; Ahaddad 26'; Malango (yellow card) 77'; Haddad (yellow card) 83'		Lirki 3'; Cisse (yellow card) 90'	Stadium: Stade Mohammed V Referee: Dakki Reddad

15 December 2019 Round 7	Rapide Oued Zem	0–0	Raja CA	Oued Zem
15:00	Abouzhar (yellow card) 64'		Zrida (yellow card) 21'; Jbira (yellow card) 45'	Stadium: Stade Municipal de Oued Zem; Referee: Abdelaziz Lamssalek

30 December 2019 Round 8	Raja CA	0–2	Fath Union Sport	Casablanca
17:00	Medkour (yellow card) 82'; Douik (red card) 77'		Bellamri 64'; Louani (yellow card) 44' (goal) 82'; Jaadi (yellow card) 78' (yellow-red card) 85'	Stadium: Stade Mohammed V Referee: Yassine Bouslim

27 July 2020 Round 9	Difaâ El Jadidi	0–0	Raja CA	El Jadida
20:00	Hadraf (yellow card) 48' (yellow-red card) 75'		Zrida (yellow card) 42'; Jbira (yellow card) 90'	Stadium: Stade El Abdi; Attendance: 0 (close doors); Referee: Samir Guezzaz

22 December 2019 Round 10	Raja CA	1–0	Wydad AC	Casablanca
15:00	Ahadad 81'		Asrir (yellow card) 90+2'; Nekkach (yellow card) 90+2' (yellow-red card) 90+5'; El Hassouni (yellow card) 90+6'; Kamal (yellow card) 90+7'	Stadium: Stade Mohammed V Referee: Rédouane Jiyed

15 January 2020 Round 11	Ittihad Tanger	1–4	Raja CA	Tangier
19:00	Mhannaoui (yellow card) 45+3'; El Amraoui 46'		Malango 31', 66'; Benhalib 36', 48'; Soukhane (yellow card) 73'; Arjoune (yellow card) 90+4'	Stadium: Stade Ibn Batouta; Referee: Dakki Reddad

22 January 2020 Round 12	Raja CA	1–1	Mouloudia Oujda	Casablanca
19:00	Ahaddad 13'; Ngah (yellow card) 38'; Benoun (yellow card) 71'; Haddad (yellow card) 90+2'		Munganga (yellow card) 8'; Jaadi 74'; Khafifi (yellow card) 79'	Stadium: Stade Mohammed V Referee: Jamal Belbassri

19 January 2020 Round 13	Nahdat Berkane	2–2	Raja CA	Berkane
19:00	Namsaoui 65'; Dayo (yellow card) 68'; Iajour 70'; Laaroubi (yellow card) 87'		Hafidi 2', 88'; Benoun (yellow card) 90'	Stadium: Stade Municipal de Berkane; Referee: Redouane Jiyed

17 February 2020 Round 14	Raja CA	2–1	Olympique Khouribga	Casablanca
17:00	Rahimi 44' (pen.); Nanah 77'; Madkour (yellow card) 82'		Ouerdani (yellow card) 5'; Hajhouj 83'	Stadium: Stade Mohammed V Referee: Abdelaziz Lamssalek

12 February 2020 Round 15	AS FAR	1–0	Raja CA	Rabat
17:00	Chabani (yellow card) 55'; Toungara (yellow card) 57'; Joseph 69'; Fikri (yellow card) 90+3'		Jabroun (yellow card) 21'	Stadium: Prince Moulay Abdellah Stadium; Referee: Abderrahim El Yaacoubi

21 February 2020 Round 16	Raja Beni Mellal	1–2	Raja CA	Beni Mellal
17:00	Lghar (yellow card) 60'; Salhi 84' (pen.); Allali (yellow card) 90+2'		Rahimi 64'; El Wardi 73' (pen.); Benoun (yellow card) 83'	Stadium: Stade d'honneur de Beni Mellal; Referee: Hicham Tamsamani

30 July 2020 Round 17	Raja CA	3–1	Renaissance Zemamra	Casablanca
22:00	Boutayeb (yellow card) 13' (yellow-red card) 89'; Rahimi (yellow card) 19'; Moutouali 29' (pen.); Ahaddad 42', 69'		Sarrhat (yellow card) 23'; Kiani (yellow card) 55'; Lamti (yellow card) 73'; Dahdouh 75'	Stadium: Stade Mohammed V Attendance: 0 (close doors); Referee: Abdelaziz Lamssalek

2 August 2020 Round 18	Raja CA	2–0	Youssoufia Berrechid	Casablanca
20:00	Hafidi 50'; Benoun (yellow card) 67'; Ahaddad 72'; Habti (yellow card) 76'		Niani (yellow card) 19'; Taik (yellow card) 49'	Stadium: Stade Mohammed V Attendance: 0 (close doors); Referee: Mustapha Kechaf

5 August 2020 Round 19	Moghreb Tétouan	0–0	Raja CA	Tétouan
20:00	El Ouardighi (yellow card) 39'; Safsafi (yellow card) 49'; Hasnaoui (yellow card) 90'		Zrida (yellow card) 75'	Stadium: Stade Saniat Rmel; Attendance: 0 (close doors); Referee: Daki Reddad

8 August 2020 Round 20	Raja CA	2–0	Olympic Club de Safi	Casablanca
18:00	Achchakir 19'; Rahimi 45+1'; Madkour (yellow card) 56'		Khalis (yellow card) 41'; Sabbar (yellow card) 67'	Stadium: Stade Mohammed V Attendance: 0 (close doors); Referee: Abdelaziz Lamssalek

11 August 2020 Round 21	Hassania Agadir	0–2	Raja CA	Agadir
20:00	Cisse (yellow card) 60'		Moutouali (yellow card) 23'; Ahaddad (yellow card) 63' (goal) 73'; Rahimi 64'	Stadium: Stade Adrar; Attendance: 0 (close doors); Referee: Yassine Bouslim

27 September 2020 Round 22	Raja CA	1–0	Rapide Oued Zem	Casablanca
19:15	Ahaddad (yellow card) 9'; Moutouali 83' (pen.)		El Ghafouli (yellow card) 90+1'	Stadium: Stade Mohammed V Attendance: 0 (close doors); Referee: Mohamed Nhayeh

19 August 2020 Round 23	Fath Union Sport	0–1	Raja CA	Rabat
20:00	Louani (yellow card) 45'; Aït Khorsa (yellow card) 63'		Moutouali 29'; Al Makahasi (yellow card) 86'	Stadium: Stade Moulay Hassan; Attendance: 0 (close doors); Referee: Hicham Tamsamani

20 September 2020 Round 24	Raja CA	3–1	Difaâ El Jadidi	Casablanca
21:30	Rahimi 3'; Zrida (yellow card) 10'; Benoun (yellow card) 13'; Al Makahasi 38' (yellow card) 45+1'; Moutouali 58' (pen.); Al Warfali (yellow card) 90+1'; Medkour (yellow card) 90+4'		Amaanan (yellow card) 33'; Askandar (yellow card) 84'; Karnass 90+1' (pen.)	Stadium: Stade Mohammed V Attendance: 0 (close doors); Referee: Adil Zourak

24 September 2020 Round 25	Wydad AC	0–0	Raja CA	Casablanca
19:15	Arjoune (yellow card) 28'; Al Makahasi (yellow card) 67'; Rahimi (yellow card) 90+4'	Report	Najmeddine (yellow card) 12'; Attiat Allah (yellow card) 40'; Rahim (yellow card) 55'	Stadium: Stade Mohammed V Attendance: 0 (close doors); Referee: Rédouane Jiyed

2 September 2020 Round 26	Raja CA	0–1	Ittihad Tanger	Casablanca
20:00	Achchakir (yellow card) 60'		El Ouahabi (yellow card) 56'; Anouar 74'	Stadium: Stade Mohammed V Attendance: 0 (close doors); Referee: Adil Zourak

30 September 2020 Round 27	Mouloudia Oujda	2–2	Raja CA	Oujda
19:00	Sadaoui 37'; Bompunga (yellow card) 44'; Diakité 62'; Harkass (yellow card) 71'; El Hany (yellow card) 73'		Ahaddad 3'; Arjoune (yellow card) 52'; Moutouali 71' (pen.)	Stadium: Honneur Stadium; Attendance: 0 (close doors); Referee: Abdelaziz Lamssalek

4 October 2020 Round 28	Raja CA	2–2	Nahdat Berkane	Casablanca
19:00	Rahimi 3', 90+6'; Hafidi (yellow card) 44'; Al Makahasi (yellow card) 71'		Dayo (yellow card) 29'; Laachir 42'; Iajour 54' (yellow card) 67'; Laâroubi (yellow card) 90+4'	Stadium: Stade Mohammed V Attendance: 0 (close doors); Referee: Adil Zourak

7 October 2020 Round 29	Olympique Khouribga	1–2	Raja CA	Khouribga
19:00	Dayoum 43'; Tachtach (yellow card) 45+1'; Kalai (red card) 90+6'		Hafidi 24' (yellow card) 59'; Ahaddad (yellow card) 35'; Nanah 37'; Benoun (yellow card) 54'; Moutouali (yellow card) 58'	Stadium: Complexe OCP; Attendance: 0 (close doors); Referee: Daki Reddad

11 October 2020 Round 30	Raja CA	2–1	AS FAR	Casablanca
19:00	Arjoune (yellow card) 27'; Haddad (yellow card) 45+1'; Hafidi 62', 90'; Al Makahasi (yellow card) 90+6'		Slim (yellow card) 29'; Gnadou 42'; Bamaamar (yellow card) 90+6'	Stadium: Stade Mohammed V Attendance: 0 (close doors); Referee: Redouane Jiyed

=== Moroccan Throne Cup ===
31 August 2019 Round of 32	Raja CA	2–3	Renaissance Zemamra	Casablanca
20:00	Nanah 10'; Islah 67'		El Mobaraky 52'; Ghabra 64'; El Bahri 80'	Stadium: Stade Mohammed V Referee: Mohamed Nhayeh

=== Champions League ===
==== Qualifying rounds ====
In the qualifying rounds, each tie will be played on a home-and-away two-legged basis. If the aggregate score will be tied after the second leg, the away goals rule was applied, and if still tied, extra time will not be played, and the penalty shoot-out will be used to determine the winner (Regulations III. 13 & 14).

===== Preliminary round =====
10 August 2019 First leg	Brikama United (The Gambia)	3–3	(Morocco) Raja CA	Bakau
16:00 UTC+0	Bojang 24', 37'; Manneh 45'	Report	Banoun 5', 59'; Moutouali 28'	Stadium: Independence Stadium; Referee: Elhadji Amadou Sy (Senegal)

24 August 2019 Second leg	Raja CA (Morocco)	4–0 (7–3 agg.)	(The Gambia) Brikama United	Casablanca
20:00 UTC+1	Rahimi 17'; Nanah 49', 76'; Moutouali 52'	Report		Stadium: Stade Mohammed V Referee: Charles Benle Bulu (Ghana)

===== First round =====
15 September 2019 First leg	Al-Nasr (Libya)	1–3	(Morocco) Raja CA	Cairo (Egypt) (Note: Teams from Libya played their home matches outside the country due to security concerns from the ongoing civil war.)
20:00 UTC+2	Sherif 71'	Report	Ngoma 51'; Nanah 72'; Moutouali 85'	Stadium: Petro Sport Stadium; Referee: Lofti Bekouassa (Algeria)

28 September 2019 Second leg	Raja CA (Morocco)	1–1	(Libya) Al-Nasr	Casablanca
19:00 UTC+1	Moutouali 8'	Report	Figongang 23'	Stadium: Stade Mohammed V Referee: Elsiddig Mohamed Eltreefe (Sudan)

==== Group stage ====
Pos	Team	Pld	W	D	L	GF	GA	GD	Pts	Qualification	EST	RCA	JSK	VIT
1	(Tunisia) Espérance de Tunis	6	3	2	1	7	3	+4	11 (Note: Head-to-head points: Espérance de Tunis 4, Raja Casablanca 1.)	Advance to knockout stage	—	2–2	1–0	0–0
2	(Morocco) Raja Casablanca	6	3	2	1	6	4	+2	11	Advance to knockout stage	0–2	—	2–0	1–0
3	(Algeria) JS Kabylie	6	2	1	3	3	7	−4	7		1–0	0–0	—	1–0
4	(Democratic Republic of the Congo) AS Vita Club	6	1	1	4	4	6	−2	4		0–2	0–1	4–1	—

Source: CAF
Notes:

30 November 2019 Matchday 1	Raja CA (Morocco)	0–2	(Tunisia) Espérance de Tunis	Casablanca
19:00 (20:00 UTC+1)		Report	Badri 8'; Ouattara 15'	Stadium: Stade Mohammed V Referee: Victor Gomes (South Africa)

6 December 2019 Matchday 2	AS Vita Club (Democratic Republic of the Congo)	0–1	(Morocco) Raja CA	Kinshasa
16:00 (17:00 UTC+1)		Report	Rahimi 48'	Stadium: Stade des Martyrs; Referee: Janny Sikazwe (Zambia)

27 December 2019 Matchday 3	Raja CA (Morocco)	2–0	(Algeria) JS Kabylie	Casablanca
19:00 (20:00 UTC+1)	Malango 51'; Rahimi 54'	Report		Stadium: Stade Mohammed V Referee: Mohamed Maarouf (Egypt)

10 January 2020 Matchday 4	JS Kabylie (Algeria)	0–0	(Morocco) Raja CA	Tizi Ouzou
16:00 (17:00 UTC+1)		Report		Stadium: Stade du 1er Novembre 1954; Referee: Louis Hakizimana (Rwanda)

25 January 2020 Matchday 5	Espérance de Tunis (Tunisia)	2–2	(Morocco) Raja CA	Tunis
19:00 (20:00 UTC+1)	Benguit 32'; Ben Choug 81'	Report	Ngah 49'; Banoun 67'	Stadium: Stade Olympique de Radès; Referee: Bakary Gassama (Gambia)

1 February 2020 Matchday 6	Raja CA (Morocco)	1–0	(Democratic Republic of the Congo) AS Vita Club	Casablanca
16:00 (17:00 UTC+1)	Banoun 3'	Report		Stadium: Stade Mohammed V Referee: Joshua Bondo (Botswana)

==== Knockout stage ====
Following the quarter-finals, due to the COVID-19 pandemic in Africa, the semi-finals, originally scheduled for 1–2 May (first legs) and 8–9 May (second legs), were postponed indefinitely on 11 April 2020, and the final, originally scheduled for 29 May, was also postponed on 18 April 2020. On 30 June 2020, the CAF Executive Committee proposed that the competition would resume with a Final Four format played as single matches in a host country to be decided. However, these plans were later halted after the Cameroonian Football Federation withdrew from hosting the Final Four, and the CAF decided against hosting it in either Egypt or Morocco in the principle of fairness. On 3 August 2020, the CAF announced that the competition would resume in its original format with the semi-finals played on 25–26 September (first legs) and 2–3 October (second legs), and the final played on 16 or 17 October. On 10 September 2020, the CAF announced that at the request of the Royal Moroccan Football Federation, the semi-finals were rescheduled to 17–18 October (first legs) and 23–24 October (second legs), and the final to 6 November. On 22 October 2020, the CAF announced that the semi-final second leg between Zamalek and Raja, originally scheduled to be played on 24 October, was postponed to 1 November, due to Raja being required by Moroccan authorities to self-isolate until 27 October after eight players testing positive for the COVID-19 virus, with the total number of cases increasing to fourteen the following day. On 30 October 2020, the CAF announced that this match was further postponed to 4 November, the final postponed to 27 November.

===== Quarter-finals =====
28 February 2020 First leg	Raja CA (Morocco)	2–0	(Democratic Republic of the Congo) TP Mazembe	Casablanca
19:00 (20:00 UTC+1)	Malango 6'; Banoun 79'	Report		Stadium: Stade Mohammed V Referee: Janny Sikazwe (Zambia)

7 March 2020 Second leg	TP Mazembe (Democratic Republic of the Congo)	1–0	(Morocco) Raja CA	Lubumbashi
13:00 (15:00 UTC+2)	Tshibangu 50'	Report		Stadium: Stade TP Mazembe; Referee: Bamlak Tessema Weyesa (Ethiopia)

===== Semi-finals =====
18 October 2020 First leg	Raja CA (Morocco)	0–1	(Egypt) Zamalek	Casablanca
19:00 (20:00 UTC+1)		Report	Bencharki 18'	Stadium: Stade Mohammed V Referee: Sidi Alioum (Cameroon)

4 November 2020 (Note: The second leg between Zamalek and Raja CA, originally scheduled to be played on 24 October 2020, 21:00 UTC+2, at Cairo International Stadium, Cairo, was postponed to 1 November 2020, due to Rajaccv being required by Moroccan authorities to self-isolate until 27 October 2020 after eight players testing positive for the COVID-19 virus, with the total number of cases increasing to fourteen the following day. The match was later further postponed to 4 November 2020.) Second leg	Zamalek (Egypt)	3–1	(Morocco) Raja CA	Cairo
19:00 (21:00 UTC+2)	Sassi 61'; Mostafa 85', 88'	Report	Malango 47'	Stadium: Cairo International Stadium; Referee: Maguette N'Diaye (Senegal)

=== Arab Club Champions Cup ===
==== First round ====
23 September 2019 First leg	Raja CA (Morocco)	1–0	(Palestine) Hilal Al-Quds	Casablanca
20:00 UTC+1	Moutouali 12' (pen.)	Report		Stadium: Stade Mohammed V Referee: Beida Dahane (Mauritania)

3 October 2019 Second leg	Hilal Al-Quds (Palestine)	0–2	(Morocco) Raja CA	Al-Ram
19:00 UTC+3		Report	Ngoma 47'; Nanah 82'	Stadium: Faisal Al-Husseini International Stadium; Referee: Ahmed Yacoub (Jordan)

==== Second round ====
2 November 2019 First leg	Raja CA (Morocco)	1–1	(Morocco) Wydad AC	Casablanca
19:00 UTC+1	Ngoma 48'	Report	El Haddad 33'	Stadium: Stade Mohammed V Referee: Mohammed Abdulla Hassan Mohamed (United Arab Emirates)

23 November 2019 Second leg	Wydad AC (Morocco)	4–4 (5–5 (a) agg.)	(Morocco) Raja CA	Casablanca
20:00 UTC+1	Nahiri 13' (pen.); El Hassouni 55'; El Kaabi 57'; Aouk 71'	Report	Moutouali 49' (pen.), 88' (pen.); Ahaddad 74'; Malango 90+4'	Stadium: Stade Mohammed V Referee: Mahmoud El Banna (Egypt)

==== Quarter-finals ====
4 January 2020 First leg	MC Alger (Algeria)	1–2	(Morocco) Raja CA	Blida
20:00 UTC+1	Frioui 29'	Report	Moutouali 58' (pen.); Malango 82'	Stadium: Mustapha Tchaker Stadium; Referee: Adel Al-Naqbi (United Arab Emirates)

9 February 2020 Second leg	Raja CA (Morocco)	0–1	(Algeria) MC Alger	Casablanca
20:00 UTC+1		Report	Frioui 42' (pen.)	Stadium: Stade Mohammed V Referee: Mohammed Al-Hoish (Saudi Arabia)

==== Semi-finals ====
The tournament was postponed for ten months in 2020 due to COVID-19 pandemic, and the final was played on 21 August 2021, where Raja defeated Al-Ittihad Jeddah on penalties after a 4–4 draw to earn their second title.

16 February 2020 First leg	Ismaily (Egypt)	1–0	(Morocco) Raja CA	Ismailia
18:00 UTC+2	Ben Youssef 52' (pen.)	Report		Stadium: Ismailia Stadium; Referee: Ahmed Al-Kaf (Oman)

== Squad information ==
=== Playing statistics ===
No.	Pos	Nat	Player	Total		Botola		Throne Cup		Champions League		Arab Club Champions	
No.	Pos	Nat	Player	Apps	Goals	Apps	Goals	Apps	Goals	Apps	Goals	Apps	Goals
Goalkeepers
	GK	(Morocco) MAR	Anas Zniti	34	0	25	0	0	0	9	0	0	0
	GK	(Morocco) MAR	Mohamed Bouamira	7	0	5	0	1	0	1	0	0	0
	GK	(Morocco) MAR	Amir Haddaoui	0	0	0	0	0	0	0	0	0	0
Defenders
	DF	(Morocco) MAR	Ilias Haddad	15	0	11	0	0	0	4	0	0	0
	DF	(Libya) LBA	Sanad Al Warfali	32	0	23	0	0	0	9	0	0	0
	DF	(Morocco) MAR	Badr Benoun	27	5	19	0	1	0	7	5	0	0
	DF	(Morocco) MAR	Omar Boutayeb	16	0	14	0	0	0	2	0	0	0
	DF	(Morocco) MAR	Abdelilah Madkour	15	0	11	0	0	0	4	0	0	0
	DF	(Morocco) MAR	Abdeljalil Jbira	18	0	13	0	0	0	5	0	0	0
	DF	(Cameroon) CMR	Fabrice Ngah	26	1	17	0	1	0	8	1	0	0
	DF	(Morocco) MAR	Mohamed Douik	12	0	7	0	1	0	4	0	0	0
	DF	(Morocco) MAR	Zakaria Driouch	0	0	0	0	0	0	0	0	0	0
	DF	(Morocco) MAR	Oussama Soukhane	5	0	5	0	0	0	0	0	0	0
Midfielders
	MF	(Morocco) MAR	Mohamed Zrida	22	0	19	0	0	0	3	0	0	0
	MF	(Morocco) MAR	Abderrahim Achchakir	29	1	22	1	0	0	7	0	0	0
	MF	(Morocco) MAR	Omar Arjoune	33	0	26	0	0	0	7	0	0	0
	MF	(Morocco) MAR	Mohamed Al Makahasi	16	1	13	1	0	0	3	0	0	0
	MF	(Democratic Republic of the Congo) COD	Luamba Ngoma	24	1	14	0	1	0	9	1	0	0
	MF	(Morocco) MAR	Zakaria El Wardi	31	1	24	1	1	0	6	0	0	0
	MF	(Morocco) MAR	Ayoub Nanah	24	6	17	2	1	1	6	3	0	0
	MF	(Morocco) MAR	Mohsine Moutaouali	35	10	24	6	1	0	10	4	0	0
	MF	(Morocco) MAR	Abdelilah Hafidi	23	6	18	6	0	0	5	0	0	0
	MF	(Morocco) MAR	Abdelkarim Namani	0	0	0	0	0	0	0	0	0	0
Forwards
	FW	(Morocco) MAR	Mahmoud Benhalib	9	2	4	2	1	0	4	0	0	0
	FW	(Democratic Republic of the Congo) COD	Ben Malango	28	8	19	5	0	0	9	3	0	0
	FW	(Morocco) MAR	Youssef Bekkari	8	0	8	0	0	0	0	0	0	0
	FW	(Morocco) MAR	Hamid Ahadad	28	9	22	9	1	0	5	0	0	0
	FW	(Morocco) MAR	Zakaria Habti	5	0	3	0	0	0	2	0	0	0
	FW	(Morocco) MAR	Anas Jabroun	14	0	11	0	0	0	3	0	0	0
	FW	(Morocco) MAR	Soufiane Rahimi	38	13	28	10	1	0	9	3	0	0
	FW	(Morocco) MAR	Maati Tamaiazou	5	0	5	0	0	0	0	0	0	0
	FW	(Morocco) MAR	Hicham Islah	1	1	0	0	1	1	0	0	0	0
Players transferred out during the season
	DF	(Mali) MLI	Salif Coulibaly	1	0	0	0	1	0	0	0	0	0

Last updated: 11 October 2020

=== Goalscorers ===
Includes all competitive matches. The list is sorted alphabetically by surname when total goals are equal.

No.	Nat.	Player	Pos.	B	TC	CL 1	ACC	TOTAL
5	(Morocco)	Mohsine Moutouali	MF	6	0	4	5	15
21	(Morocco)	Soufiane Rahimi	FW	10	0	3	0	13
9	(Democratic Republic of the Congo)	Ben Malango	FW	5	0	3	3	11
17	(Morocco)	Hamid Ahaddad	FW	9	0	0	1	10
30	(Morocco)	Ayoub Nanah	FW	2	1	3	1	7
18	(Morocco)	Abdelilah Hafidi	MF	6	0	0	0	6
13	(Morocco)	Badr Benoun	DF	0	0	5	0	5
6	(Democratic Republic of the Congo)	Fabrice Ngoma	MF	0	0	1	2	3
10	(Morocco)	Mahmoud Benhalib	FW	2	0	0	1	3
55	(Morocco)	Abderrahim Achchakir	MF	1	0	0	0	1
23	(Morocco)	Mohamed Al Makahasi	MF	1	0	0	0	1
98	(Morocco)	Zakaria El Wardi	MF	1	0	0	0	1
4	(Cameroon)	Fabrice Ngah	DF	0	0	1	0	1
	(Morocco)	Hicham Islah	FW	0	1	0	0	1
Own Goals				0	0	0	0	0
Totals				43	2	20	13	78
