= 2019 CAF Super Cup =

2019 Total CAF Super Cup
| Espérance de Tunis | Raja CA |
| (Tunisia) | (Morocco) |
| 1 | 2 |
- Date: 29 March 2019
- Venue: Thani bin Jassim Stadium, Doha, Qatar
- Referee: Bamlak Tessema Weyesa (Ethiopia)

The 2019 CAF Super Cup (officially the 2019 Total CAF Super Cup for sponsorship reasons) was the 27th CAF Super Cup, an annual football match in Africa organized by the Confederation of African Football (CAF), between the winners of the previous season's two CAF club competitions, the CAF Champions League and the CAF Confederation Cup.

The match was played between Espérance de Tunis from Tunisia, the 2018 CAF Champions League winners, and Raja CA from Morocco, the 2018 CAF Confederation Cup winners, at the Thani bin Jassim Stadium in Doha, Qatar on 29 March 2019.

Raja CA won the match 2–1 for their second CAF Super Cup title.

The match was originally to be hosted by Espérance de Tunis at the Stade Olympique de Radès in Radès, Tunisia on 29 December 2018, but CAF announced on 12 December 2018 that the match would be played in Qatar on 20 February 2019. However, the date was later changed to 29 March 2019 after both clubs requested a new date for the match. This was the first CAF Super Cup to be played outside of Africa.

The Super Cup of this season followed a transitional calendar which allows the CAF club competitions to switch from a February-to-November schedule to an August–to-May schedule, as per the decision of the CAF Executive Committee on 20 July 2017. The Super Cup of next season will then be played in August after the 2019 Africa Cup of Nations (which has been switched from January/February to June/July) following the new calendar.

== Teams ==
| Team | Zone | Qualification | Previous participation (bold indicates winners) |
|---|---|---|---|
| (Tunisia) Espérance de Tunis | UNAF (North Africa) | 2018 CAF Champions League winners | 3 (**1995**, 1999, 2012) |
| (Morocco) Raja CA | UNAF (North Africa) | 2018 CAF Confederation Cup winners | 2 (1998, **2000**) |

== Venue ==
| City | Stadium | Location of the host city of the 2019 CAF Super Cup. |
|---|---|---|
| Doha | Thani bin Jassim Stadium | Location of the host city of the 2019 CAF Super Cup. |
| **Capacity: 20,560** | | Location of the host city of the 2019 CAF Super Cup. |

== Format ==
The CAF Super Cup was played as a single match at a neutral venue, with the CAF Champions League winners designated as the "home" team for administrative purposes. If the score was tied at the end of regulation, extra time would not be played, and the penalty shoot-out would be used to determine the winner (CAF Champions League Regulations XXVII and CAF Confederation Cup Regulations XXV).

== Ticketing ==
A total of 20,560 tickets are available in three categories: category 1 for 100 QR, category 2 for 50 QR, and category 3 for 20 QR.

== Match ==
=== Details ===
29 March 2019
19:00 UTC+3

| Espérance de Tunis (Tunisia) | 1–2 | (Morocco) Raja CA |
|---|---|---|
| Belaïli 57' | Report | Hafidi 22'; Banoun 64' |

Thani bin Jassim Stadium, Doha (Qatar)
Referee: Bamlak Tessema Weyesa (Ethiopia)

| **Espérance de Tunis** | **Raja CA** |

| GK | 19 | (Tunisia) Rami Jridi |
| RB | 22 | (Tunisia) Sameh Derbali | | (substituted off) 54' |
| CB | 5 | (Tunisia) Chamseddine Dhaouadi (c) | (yellow card) 76' |
| CB | 6 | (Tunisia) Mohamed Ali Yacoubi | | (substituted off) 73' |
| LB | 20 | (Tunisia) Ayman Ben Mohamed |
| CM | 15 | (Ivory Coast) Fousseny Coulibaly |
| CM | 30 | (Cameroon) Franck Kom | (yellow card) 81' |
| RW | 8 | (Tunisia) Anice Badri |
| AM | 18 | (Tunisia) Saad Bguir | | (substituted off) 46' |
| LW | 17 | (Libya) Hamdou Elhouni |
| CF | 11 | (Tunisia) Taha Yassine Khenissi |
Substitutes:
| GK | 1 | (Tunisia) Moez Ben Cherifia |
| DF | 24 | (Tunisia) Iheb Mbarki | | (substituted on) 54' |
| DF | 26 | (Tunisia) Houcine Rabii |
| MF | 25 | (Tunisia) Ghailene Chaalali |
| MF | 28 | (Tunisia) Mohamed Amine Meskini |
| FW | 10 | (Algeria) Youcef Belaïli | | (substituted on) 46' |
| FW | 14 | (Tunisia) Haythem Jouini | | (substituted on) 73' |
Manager:
(Tunisia) Moïne Chaâbani

| GK | 1 | (Morocco) Anas Zniti | (yellow card) 90+2' |
| RB | 25 | (Morocco) Omar Boutayeb |
| CB | 13 | (Morocco) Badr Banoun (c) | (yellow card) 86' |
| CB | 8 | (Libya) Sanad Al Ouarfali |
| LB | 5 | (Cameroon) Fabrice Gael Ngah |
| CM | 2 | (Morocco) Abderrahim Achchakir | (yellow card) 89' |
| CM | 29 | (Morocco) Zakaria El Wardi |
| RW | 24 | (Morocco) Mahmoud Benhalib |
| AM | 18 | (Morocco) Abdelilah Hafidi | | (substituted off) 80' |
| LW | 7 | (Morocco) Zakaria Hadraf | (yellow card) 76' |
| CF | 21 | (Morocco) Soufiane Rahimi | | (substituted off) 90+4' |
Substitutes:
| GK | 22 | (Morocco) Mohamed Bouamira |
| DF | 26 | (Netherlands) Ilias Haddad |
| MF | 4 | (Morocco) Mohamed Douik |
| MF | 19 | (Senegal) Ibrahima Niasse |
| FW | 9 | (Morocco) Mouhcine Iajour | | (substituted on) 90+4' |
| FW | 11 | (Morocco) Anas Jabroun |
| FW | 30 | (Morocco) Ayoub Nanah | | (substituted on) 80' |
Manager:
(France) Patrice Carteron

Assistant referees:
Zakhele Siwela (South Africa)
Waleed Ahmed Ali (Sudan)
Fourth official:
Janny Sikazwe (Zambia)

**Match rules**

- 90 minutes.
- Penalty shoot-out if scores level.
- Seven named substitutes, of which up to three may be used.

== Prize money ==
Prize money shared between CAF Champions League winner and CAF Confederations Cup winner in CAF Super Cup are as following :

| Final position | Money awarded to club |
|---|---|
| winner | US$200,000 |
| Runners-up | US$150,000 |

== See also ==
- 2019 CAF Champions League final
- 2019 CAF Confederation Cup final
