= Saifeddine Alami =

Moroccan footballer (born 1992)

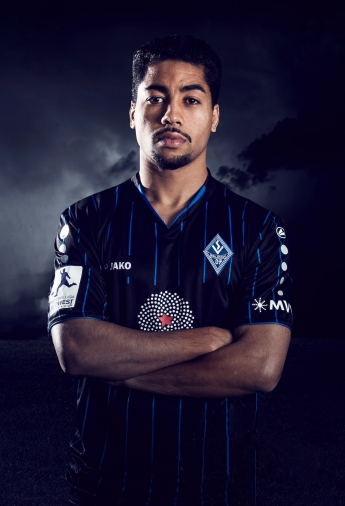

Personal information
- Full name: Saifeddine Alami Bazza
- Date of birth: 19 November 1992 (age 33)
- Place of birth: Beni Mellal, Morocco
- Height: 1.69 m (5 ft 7 in)
- Position: Midfielder

Youth career
- Tàrrega
- Nike Academy

Senior career*
Years	Team	Apps	(Gls)
2011–2012	Lleida Esportiu	9	(1)
2013–2014	Tàrrega	0	(0)
2015	Waldhof Mannheim	4	(1)
2015–2016	Dunărea Călărași	30	(8)
2016–2018	Paris FC	49	(8)
2018–2019	Raja Casablanca	8	(1)
2019–2022	Rapid București	21	(3)
2020–2021	→ Dunărea Călărași (loan)	15	(5)
2022–	Hassania Agadir	0	(0)
- * Club domestic league appearances and goals as of 04 February 2022

Saifeddine Alami Bazza (born 19 November 1992) is a Moroccan professional footballer who plays as a midfielder.

== Professional career ==
Alami was born in Morocco, but moved to Spain at the age of 7. He was part of the Nike Academy in 2012. He spent his early career in the lower divisions of Spain, Germany, and Romania before moving to Paris FC in France.

Alami made his professional debut for Paris FC in a 2–1 Ligue 2 win over Football Bourg-en-Bresse Péronnas 01, scoring on his debut and assisting the winner.

== Honours ==
Raja Casablanca

- CAF Confederation Cup: 2018
- CAF Super Cup: 2019
