= Mohamed Al Makahasi =

Moroccan footballer (born 1995)

Personal information
- Date of birth: 5 February 1995 (age 31)
- Place of birth: Martil, Morocco
- Height: 1.75 m (5 ft 9 in)
- Position: Midfielder

Team information
- Current team: Raja CA
- Number: 23

Youth career
- -2013: Moghreb Tétouan

Senior career*
Years	Team	Apps	(Gls)
2013-2020	Moghreb Tétouan	72	(2)
2020–2024	Raja CA	93	(2)
2024–2025	Al-Wehda	28	(1)
2025–	Raja CA	26	(0)

International career^{‡}
2011–2013	Morocco U20	4	(0)
2013–2015	Morocco U23	5	(0)
2019–	Morocco A'	1	(0)
Medal record
Men's football
Representing Morocco
Mediterranean Games
Winner	2013 Turkey
Islamic Solidarity Games
Winner	2013 Indonesia
African Nations Championship
Winner	2020 Cameroon
- * Club domestic league appearances and goals as of 13 September 2026 ‡ National team caps and goals as of 18 April 2024

Mohamed Al Makahasi or Makahasi (Arabic: محمد مكعازي; born 5 February 1995) is a Moroccan professional footballer who plays as a midfielder for Botola side Raja CA.

== Early life ==
Mohamed Makahasi was born on 5 February 1995 in Martil, a seaside town located northeast of Tétouan, on the shores of the Mediterranean Sea. He started playing football in the Hawma Jdida district during the street tournaments organized during Ramadan.

Aged 7, he joined the Moghreb Tétouan academy under the direction of Abdelouahed Benhsain, future coach of the first team, who personally asked Makahasi's father to register his son in the center.

== Career ==
=== Moghreb Tétouan ===
On 19 April 2013, he made his professional debut against COD Meknès in the 2012-13 Botola aging only 18 (2–0 victory). After the departure of Aziz El Amri, he will get less play time will even find himself playing for the U23 team sometimes.

On 15 May 2016, the team won their first national U23 league, after beating Difaâ Hassani El Jadidi and taking advantage Raja CA draw against Olympique Safi.

With the arrival of his former coach Abdelouahed Benhsain in the first team in March 2018, Mohamed Makahasi began to have playing time and became a starting player. He later becomes team captain.

=== Raja CA ===
On 15 January 2020, a few hours before the end of the winter transfer window, he joined Raja Club Athletic by signing a two and a half season contract.

On 20 September, he scored his first Raja's goal after an Mohsine Moutaouali assist against Difaâ Hassani El Jadidi in a 3–1 home victory.

On 11 October, Botola leaders Raja received AS FAR in the final game and needed a win to secure the title. After the visitors has scored the opener, Abdelilah Hafidi tied the score and then scored a dramatic late winner to crown Raja as 2019–20 champions of Morocco, their first league title since 2012–13.

On 10 July 2021, Raja CA beat JS Kabylie in the Confederation Cup final and secured their third title of the competition (2–1 victory).

== International career ==
Makahasi represented Morocco at U20, U23 and senior level. He appeared in many tournaments with the youth teams, including the 2013 Mediterranean Games Football Tournament and the 2013 Jeux de la Francophonie Football Tournament.

On 4 October 2019, he was called up by Houcine Ammouta with the Moroccan A' squad to face Algeria in the 2020 African Nations Championship qualifiers. Due to the COVID-19 pandemic, the competition was postponed from April 2020 to January 2021. He finally was part of the squad that won their second consecutive title after a 2–0 win over Mali in the final in Cameroon.

== Honours ==
Raja CA

- Botola: 2019–20, 2023–24; runner-up: 2018–19, 2020–21, 2021–22
- Arab Club Champions Cup: 2019–20
- CAF Confederation Cup: 2020–21
- Throne Cup: 2023–24 runner-up: 2021–22
- CAF Super Cup runner-up: 2021

Moghreb Tétouan

- Botola: 2013–14

Morocco U20

- Islamic Solidarity Games Football Tournament: 2013

Morocco U23

- Mediterranean Games Football Tournament: 2013

Morocco A'

- African Nations Championship: 2020

=== Individual ===
- Botola Team of the Season: 2021–22
