= Soufiane Rahimi =

Moroccan footballer (born 1996)

Soufiane Rahimi سفيان رحيمي
- Rahimi with Morocco in 2026

Personal information
- Full name: Soufiane Rahimi
- Date of birth: 2 June 1996 (age 30)
- Place of birth: Casablanca, Morocco
- Height: 1.83 m (6 ft 0 in)
- Positions: Striker; winger

Team information
- Current team: Al Ain
- Number: 21

Youth career
- 2006–2017: Raja CA

Senior career*
Years	Team	Apps	(Gls)
2017–2021	Raja CA	83	(30)
2017–2018	→ EJS Casablanca (loan)	28	(17)
2021–	Al Ain	109	(47)

International career^{‡}
2021–	Morocco	46	(15)
2024	Morocco Olympic (O.P.)	6	(8)
Medal record
Men's football
Representing Morocco
Africa Cup of Nations
Winner	2025 Morocco
African Nations Championship
Winner	2020 Cameroon
Olympic Games
Bronze medal – third place	2024 Paris	Team
- * Club domestic league appearances and goals as of 02:58, 25 June 2026 (UTC) ‡ National team caps and goals as of 23:55, 4 October 2026 (UTC)

Soufiane Rahimi (Arabic: سفيان رحيمي, romanized: Sufyān Raḥīmī; born 2 June 1996) is a Moroccan professional footballer who plays as a striker for UAE Pro League club Al Ain and the Morocco national team.

Rahimi started his professional career playing for Raja CA, before being sent on a loan to Étoile de Casablanca. Rahimi then returned to his former club after the end of his loan, helping the club win the 2019–20 Botola, the 2018 and 2021 CAF Confederation Cup and the 2019–20 Arab Club Champions Cup. He then signed with UAE Pro League side Al-Ain, where he led the club to win the 2023–24 AFC Champions League, finishing as the tournament's top scorer with 13 goals.

A full international for Morocco since 2021, Soufiane represented the nation at the 2020 African Nations Championship, 2021 FIFA Arab Cup, 2021 Africa Cup of Nations, 2025 Africa Cup of Nations and 2026 FIFA World Cup. Rahimi was the top goalscorer of the 2020 African Nations Championship, with five goals. At the 2024 Summer Olympics, he was selected as one of the three overage players of Morocco Olympic and won a bronze medal, as well as the top scorer award.

== Club career ==
=== Raja Club Athletic ===
Rahimi scored a total of four goals for Raja CA in 2018 CAF Confederation Cup campaign, including two goals in the final against AS Vita Club in Casablanca. This allowed them to qualify and play the 2019 CAF Super Cup against Espérance Sportive de Tunis; which then ended up winning after a 2–1 victory.

He has been one of the highest performing players in his last two seasons in Botola, becoming a top pick for the Moroccan national team coach to join the local squad. He has been closely linked with a move to Europe, and has stated his ambition of joining the Serie A in press conferences.

=== Al Ain ===
On 21 August 2021, he had played his last match with Raja CA in the 2020 Arab Club Champions Cup Final, therefore defeating Al-Ittihad in penalties; before transferring to Emirati club Al Ain. On September 17, Rahimi scored his first goal for the club in a 4–1 victory against Al-Ittihad Kalba. On 12 November 2022, Rahimi scored a double against Sharjah. On 7 November 2023, Rahmi scored in a 3–2 victory against Al Fayha in the 2023–24 AFC Champions League to qualify his team into the Knock-out stages. In the Round of 16, Rahimi scored the winning goal against Nasaf to qualify the team to the Quarter-finals. Rahimi went on to score the winning goal in a 1–0 victory against Al Nassr in the first leg of the quarter-finals and two goals in the second leg. On 15 March 2023, Rahimi scored his first ever hat-trick for the club in a 4–0 win against Ajman. In the first leg of the 2023–24 AFC Champions League Semi-final, Rahimi scored a hat-trick in a 4–2 victory against Al Hilal SFC, putting an end to Al Hilal 34 game winning streak. In the 2024 AFC Champions League final, Al Ain won 6–3 in aggregate against Yokohama F. Marinos, with Rahimi scoring a brace in the second leg, and winning the Most Valuable Player and Top scorer awards.

On 24 October 2024, Rahimi along with his international teammate Achraf Hakimi, were nominated for the 2024 African Footballer of the Year award.

== International career ==
In 2018, Rahimi was called up to the Moroccan national A' team by Jamal Sellami. Rahimi represented Morocco in the 2020 African Nations Championship, scoring a double in his third game of the group stages against Uganda. He scored in the quarter-finals in a 3–1 victory against Zambia. Morocco won an astonishing 4–0 in the semi-finals against Cameroon. With this performance, Rahimi managed of scoring a total of five goals thus helping his country to achieve the title and becoming the first and only country to win the Championship back to back. He was awarded top scorer and best player of the tournament.

Over two years after his last appearances with the national team, Rahimi was included in Morocco's squad for the friendlies against Angola and Mauritania in March 2024. He came off the bench against Angola and helped create the own-goal by David Carmo. Morocco won 1–0.

Rahimi was selected for Morocco's squad to compete in the men's football at the 2024 Summer Olympics. In the opening match of the group stage, Rahimi scored a brace in a 2–1 victory against Argentina. He then scored a goal in a 2–1 defeat against Ukraine and a goal in a 3–0 victory against Iraq, thus surpassing Ahmed Faras and becoming the top Moroccan goalscorer for the Summer Olympics with four goals. Rahimi ended the Olympics scoring a total of 8 goals in 6 appearances, becoming the first player to score in all 6 games of a single Olympic edition. On 11 December 2025, Rahimi was called up to the Morocco squad for the 2025 Africa Cup of Nations.

On 26 May 2026, Rahimi was selected in the 26-man squad for the 2026 FIFA World Cup. On 24 June, he scored his first World Cup goal and provided an assist in a 4–2 victory over Haiti. On 4 July 2026, Rahimi scored in the eighth minute of second-half stoppage time (90+8') to seal a 3–0 victory against tournament co-hosts Canada in the Round of 16, securing Morocco a place in the quarterfinals.

== Personal life ==
Born in Casablanca, Soufiane Rahimi is the older brother of Houssine Rahimi, who is also a footballer.

== Career statistics ==
=== Club ===
As of match played 21 January 2025

Appearances and goals by club, season and competition
Club	Season	League			National cup (Note: Includes Moroccan Throne Cup, UAE President's Cup)		League cup (Note: Includes UAE League Cup)		Continental		Other		Total	
Club	Season	Division	Apps	Goals	Apps	Goals	Apps	Goals	Apps	Goals	Apps	Goals	Apps	Goals
EJS Casablanca	2017–18	Botola 3	28	17	—		—		—		—		28	17
Raja CA	2018–19	Botola	26	6	4	0	—		16 (Note: Appearances in CAF Confederation Cup)	4	3 (Note: One appearance in CAF Super Cup, two appearances in Arab Club Champions Cup)	0	49	10
Raja CA	2019–20	Botola	28	10	1	0	—		9 (Note: Appearances in CAF Champions League)	3	5 (Note: Appearances in Arab Club Champions Cup)	1	43	14
Raja CA	2020–21	Botola	29	14	2	0	—		12 (Note: One appearance in CAF Champions League, eleven appearances and five goals in CAF Confederation Cup)	5	7	1	50	20
Raja CA	Total		83	30	7	0	—		37	12	15	2	142	44
Al Ain	2021–22	UAE Pro League	23	8	—		6	1	—		—		29	9
Al Ain	2022–23	UAE Pro League	26	11	6	0	5	3	—		1 (Note: Appearance in UAE Super Cup)	0	38	14
Al Ain	2023–24	UAE Pro League	18	8	2	0	7	2	13 (Note: Appearances in AFC Champions League)	13	—		40	23
Al Ain	2024–25	UAE Pro League	13	6	0	0	2	1	6	5	2 (Note: Appearances in FIFA Intercontinental Cup)	2	23	14
Al Ain	Total		80	33	8	0	20	7	19	18	4	2	130	60
Career total			191	80	15	0	20	7	56	30	18	4	300	121

=== International ===
As of match played 4 October 2026

Appearances and goals by national team and year
National team	Year	Apps	Goals
Morocco	2021	12	6
Morocco	2022	4	0
Morocco	2024	9	4
Morocco	2025	7	1
Morocco	2026	14	4
Total		46	15

Scores and results list Morocco's goal tally first, score column indicates score after each Rahimi goal.

List of Morocco international goals scored by Soufiane Rahimi
No.	Date	Venue	Opponent	Score	Result	Competition
1	26 January 2021	Reunification Stadium, Douala, Cameroon	Uganda	2–1	5–2	2020 African Nations Championship
2	26 January 2021	Reunification Stadium, Douala, Cameroon	Uganda	4–1	5–2	2020 African Nations Championship
3	31 January 2021	Reunification Stadium, Douala, Cameroon	Zambia	1–0	3–1	2020 African Nations Championship
4	3 February 2021	Limbe Stadium, Limbe, Cameroon	Cameroon	2–0	4–0	2020 African Nations Championship
5	3 February 2021	Limbe Stadium, Limbe, Cameroon	Cameroon	3–0	4–0	2020 African Nations Championship
6	4 December 2021	Ahmad bin Ali Stadium, Al Rayyan, Qatar	Jordan	4–0	4–0	2021 FIFA Arab Cup
7	11 June 2024	Adrar Stadium, Agadir, Morocco	Congo	6–0	6–0	2026 FIFA World Cup qualification
8	12 October 2024	Honor Stadium, Oujda, Morocco	Central African Republic	5–0	5–0	2025 Africa Cup of Nations qualification
9	18 November 2024	Honor Stadium, Oujda, Morocco	Lesotho	3–0	7–0	2025 Africa Cup of Nations qualification
10	18 November 2024	Honor Stadium, Oujda, Morocco	Lesotho	5–0	7–0	2025 Africa Cup of Nations qualification
11	18 November 2025	Tangier Grand Stadium, Tangier, Morocco	Uganda	3–0	4–0	Friendly
12	2 June 2026	Prince Moulay Abdellah Stadium, Rabat, Morocco	Madagascar	3–0	4–0	Friendly
13	24 June 2026	Mercedes-Benz Stadium, Atlanta, United States	Haiti	3–2	4–2	2026 FIFA World Cup
14	4 July 2026	NRG Stadium, Houston, United States	Canada	3–0	3–0	2026 FIFA World Cup
15	25 September 2026	Prince Moulay Abdellah Stadium, Rabat, Morocco	Gabon	2–0	2–0	2027 Africa Cup of Nations qualification

== Honours ==
Raja CA

- Botola Pro: 2019–20
- CAF Confederation Cup: 2018, 2020–21
- CAF Super Cup: 2019
- Arab Club Champions Cup: 2019–20

Al Ain

- UAE Pro League: 2021–22, 2025–26
- UAE President's Cup: 2025–26
- UAE League Cup: 2021–22
- AFC Champions League: 2023–24

Morocco

- African Nations Championship: 2020
- Africa Cup of Nations: 2025

Morocco Olympic

- Summer Olympics Bronze Medal: 2024

Individual

- Botola Pro Best Player: 2019–20, 2020–21
- Botola Pro Best Young player: 2018–19
- Botola Pro Top assist provider: 2020–21
- Best Player in African Nations Championship: 2020
- Top Scorer in African Nations Championship: 2020
- African Nations Championship Team of the Tournament: 2020
- Raja CA Player of the season: 2020
- Raja CA Goal of the Season: 2021
- Pro League player of the month: September 2021, November 2021, February 2022, October 2022, February 2023, September 2023
- Pro League Best Fans player of the year: 2022, 2023, 2024
- Pro League Team of the year: 2022, 2023
- UMFP Best Moroccan Player Abroad: 2024
- AFC Champions League MVP: 2023–24
- AFC Champions League top scorer: 2023–24
- Olympics Games top scorer: 2024
- FIFA Intercontinental Cup top scorer: 2024
- IFFHS World's Best International Goal Scorer: 2024

Record

- Fastest goal in history of CHAN
- Top scorer in the history of Morocco in the Olympics Games.
