= Père Jégo Stadium =

Stadium in Casablanca, Morocco

Coordinates: 33.5574°N 7.6515°W

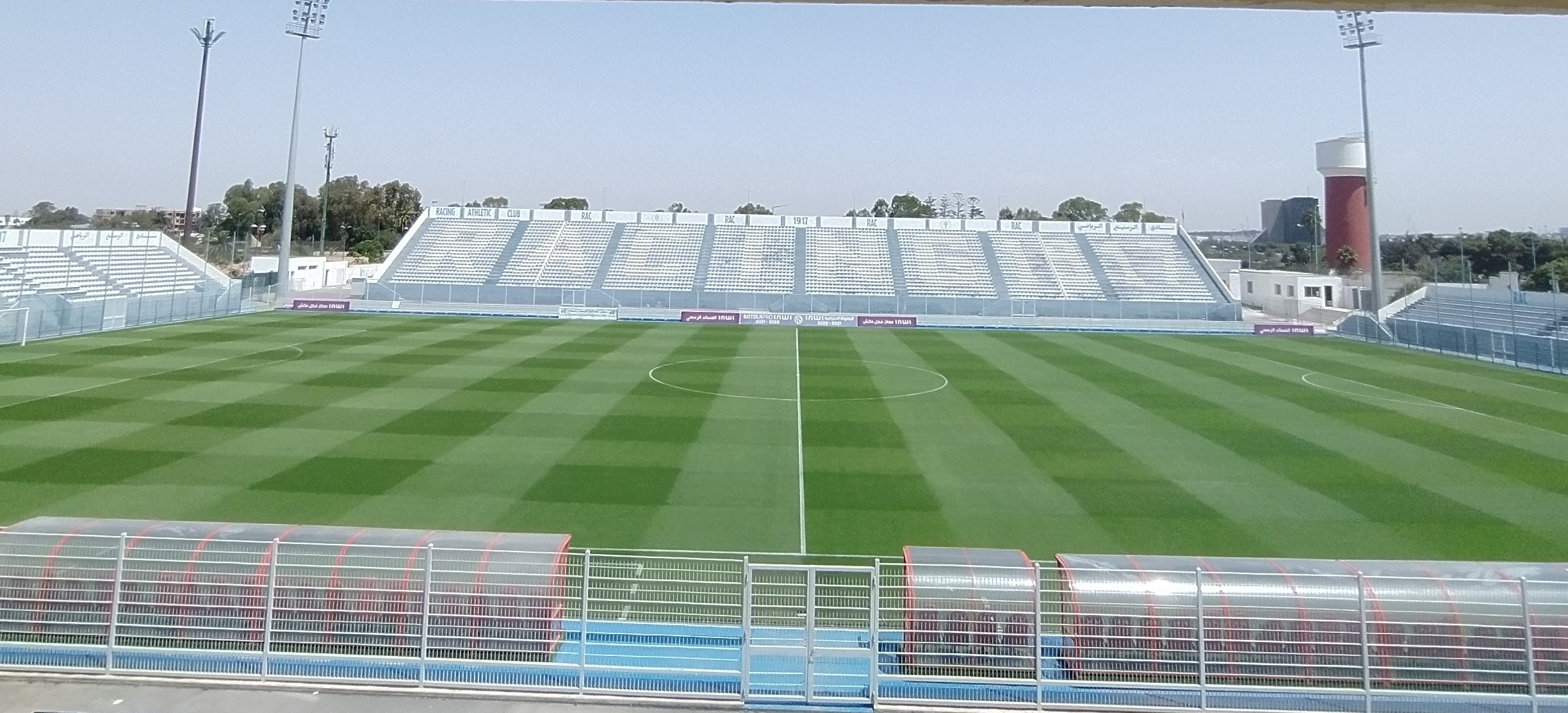
- Interactive map of Père Jégo Stadium
- Location: Casablanca, Morocco
- Owner: City of Casablanca
- Capacity: 10,000
- Surface: Grass

Tenants
- Racing Casablanca; Étoile de Casablanca

The Père Jégo Stadium is a multi-purpose stadium in Casablanca, Morocco. It is used mostly for football matches and is the home ground of Racing Casablanca. The stadium was named after Moroccan footballer and manager Père Jégo.

The stadium currently holds 10,000 spectators.
