= Walid Sabbar =

Moroccan footballer

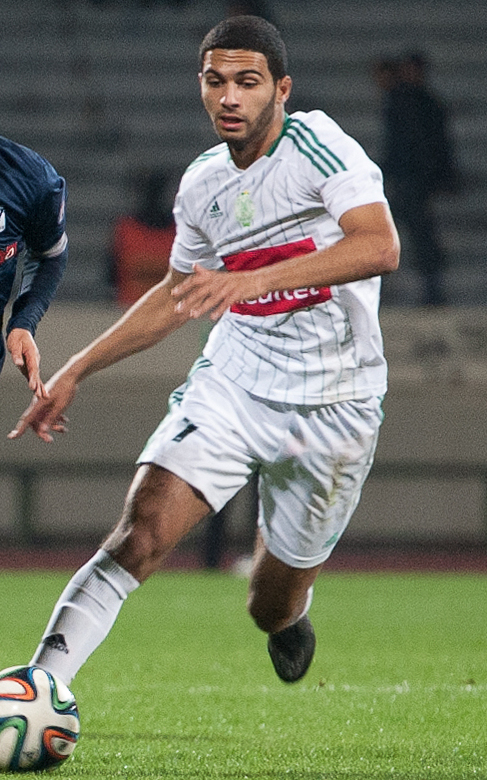
- Sabbar with Raja CA in 2015

Personal information
- Date of birth: 25 February 1996 (age 30)
- Place of birth: Casablanca, Morocco
- Height: 1.83 m (6 ft 0 in)
- Position: Midfielder

Youth career
- 2006–2014: Raja CA

Senior career*
Years	Team	Apps	(Gls)
2014–2018	Raja CA	38	(0)
2016	→ Kawkab Marrakech (loan)	13	(1)
2018–2021	Olympique de Safi	62	(7)
2021–2022	Emirates	28	(3)
2022–2023	Raja CA	31	(3)
2023–2024	Al-Arabi		

International career^{‡}
2013-2014	Morocco U17	22	(3)
2014-2015	Morocco U20	7	(0)
2015	Morocco U23	5	(0)
- * Club domestic league appearances and goals as of 26 June 2023 ‡ National team caps and goals as of 26 June 2023

Walid Sabbar (Arabic: وليد الصبار; born 25 February 1996) is a Moroccan professional footballer who plays as a midfielder. He was a squad member for the 2013 FIFA U-17 World Cup.

== Honours ==
Raja CA

- Coupe du Trône: 2017

Morocco

- Toulon Tournament: runner-up 2015
