= Abdelilah Hafidi =

Moroccan footballer

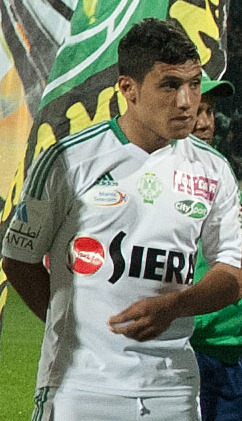
- Hafidi with Raja CA in 2014

Personal information
- Full name: Abdelilah Hafidi
- Date of birth: 30 January 1992 (age 34)
- Place of birth: Boujad, Morocco
- Height: 1.69 m (5 ft 7 in)
- Position: Attacking midfielder

Team information
- Current team: Raja CA
- Number: 81

Youth career
- 2004–2009: US Bejaâd
- 2009–2011: Raja CA

Senior career*
Years	Team	Apps	(Gls)
2011–2022	Raja CA	222	(50)
2022–2023	Al-Hazem	15	(1)
2023–	Raja CA	20	(0)

International career^{‡}
2013–	Morocco A'	25	(6)
2013–	Morocco	6	(1)
Medal record
Men's football
Representing Morocco
African Nations Championship
Winner	2018 Morocco
Winner	2020 Cameroon
- * Club domestic league appearances and goals as of 26 June 2023 (UTC) ‡ National team caps and goals as of 19 April 2023 (UTC)

Abdelilah Hafidi (born 30 January 1992) is a Moroccan professional footballer who plays as an attacking midfielder for Raja CA and the Morocco national team. He started his professional career playing for Raja CA.

== Club career ==
During the 2011–12 Botola season, Hafidi was one of a few Raja CA B players who were called up to the first team as part of the team's board members plan, which sought to solve the team's financial difficulties by giving the chance to its young players to integrate into the first team. Hafidi made 11 appearances during that season. However, he did not play for most of the season, but still managed to score 3 goals in the Botola; 2 goals against Chabab Massira (4–1) and 1 goal against KAC Kenitra (5–2). Raja ended a disappointing 2011–12 season as fourth in the ranking of the Botola, which secured them a place in the Arab Champions League.

During the 2012–13 pre-season transfer window, Raja CA's new president, Mohamed Boudrika, signed the Moroccan coach, Mohamed Fakhir. The latter made some meaningful changes to the team's squad. However, Hafidi was not released as Fakhir was convinced that the young player has a substantial individual talent. As a result, Hafidi imposed himself as an indispensable player in the team, despite his young age. Furthermore, he played an important role in the front line of the team, during all 5 matches of the Moroccan Cup Coupe du Trône, by scoring 3 goals in 3 consecutive matches, against Hassania Agadir (2–1), KACM (0–1) and Wydad Casablanca (1–3). Consequently, Raja won the Cup for the seventh time in its history, after beating AS FAR in the final, by penalty shoot-outs (4–5), following a score of (0–0) in the match.

Hafidi's performances drew more attention during the 2012–13 season. He scored 6 goals in the 2012–13 Botola, 2 goals in the Arab Champions League and 3 goals in the Throne Cup, and won his first trophies, the 2012 Throne Cup and the 2012–13 Botola. The latter qualified Raja directly to the 2013 FIFA Club World Cup, as Morocco was the host country of that year's tournament.

These were the beginning of a total of 8 titles he won with Raja. He won his third after a draw with Libyan side Al-Hilal SC to win the 2015 UNAF Cup. In 2017, Raja defeated Difaâ Hassani El Jadidi to earn the 2017 Moroccan Throne Cup.

He won the 2018 CAF Confederation Cup after defeating AS Vita Club in the final, which guaranteed them a spot in the 2019 CAF Super Cup that Raja will win after a 2–1 victory over Espérance Sportive de Tunis in Thani bin Jassim Stadium, Doha. In 2020, He won his second Botola title and the 2020 Arab Champions League after defeating Al-Ittihad 4–3 in penalties. In 2021, he achieved the 2021 CAF Confederation Cup after defeating JS Kabylie 2–1 in the final. Raja lost the 2021 CAF Super Cup against Al Ahly SC in penalties.

On January 13, 2022, Raja CA announced Hafidi's departure to Al-Hazm F.C. Established himself as one of the best Moroccan players of his generation he said goodbye after spending more than ten years with the club, winning 9 trophies and scoring 68 goals and 75 assists in 316 games.

On January 29, 2023, Abdelilah Hafidi returns to Raja and signs a six-month renewable contract after leaving Al Hazm.

== International career ==
Hafidi made his debut for Morocco in the 2013 Africa Cup of Nations group stage game against South Africa, scored one in an eventual 2–2 draw that saw Morocco eliminated after three draws.

Hafidi represented Morocco in the 2018 African Nations Championship, helping his country to achieve the first chan title for Morocco after defeating Nigeria 4–0 in the final. He also took part in the 2020 African Nations Championship, helping his country to achieve the title and becoming the first and only country to win the Championship back to back after defeating Mali 2–0 in the final.

== Career statistics ==
Scores and results list Morocco's goal tally first.

No.	Date	Venue	Opponent	Score	Result	Competition
1.	27 January 2013	Moses Mabhida Stadium, Durban, South Africa	South Africa	2–1	2–2	2013 Africa Cup of Nations
2.	1 December 2021	Al Janoub Stadium, Al Wakrah, Qatar	Palestine	2–0	4–0	2021 FIFA Arab Cup
3.	1 December 2021	Al Janoub Stadium, Al Wakrah, Qatar	Palestine	3–0	4–0	2021 FIFA Arab Cup

== Honours ==
Raja CA

- FIFA Club World Cup runner-up: 2013
- Botola: 2013, 2020
- Coupe du Trône: 2012, 2017 runner-up: 2013
- North African Cup of Champions: 2015
- Arab Champions League: 2020
- CAF Confederation Cup: 2018, 2021
- CAF Super Cup: 2019

Morocco

- African Nations Championship: 2018, 2020

Individual

- Botola Rookie of the Year: 2011–12
- Botola Player of the Year: 2018–19
- Botola Top assists: 2016–17
- Raja CA top goalscorer: 2014-15, 2015–16
- Raja CA top assists: 2015–16, 2016–17, 2017-18, 2018-19
- Raja CA Player of the Month: October 2020
- CHAN top assists: 2020
