= Karim El Hany =

French footballer (born 1988)

Personal information
- Date of birth: 12 January 1988 (age 38)
- Place of birth: Sartène, France
- Height: 1.71 m (5 ft 7 in)
- Position: Midfielder

Team information
- Current team: Mouloudia Oujda

Youth career
- 2007–2008: Gazélec Ajaccio

Senior career*
Years	Team	Apps	(Gls)
2008–2010	Gazélec Ajaccio	55	(8)
2010–2013	AC Ajaccio	25	(0)
2013	FC Brussels	6	(0)
2013–2015	RWS Bruxelles	22	(2)
2015–2017	Mouloudia Oujda	37	(1)
2017–2019	Kawkab Marrakech	52	(0)
2019–	Mouloudia Oujda	0	(0)
- * Club domestic league appearances and goals as of 14 March 2019

Karim El Hany (born 12 January 1988) is a French professional footballer who plays as a midfielder for Mouloudia Oujda. He first started playing for Gazélec Ajaccio at the age of 19 before moving to rivals AC Ajaccio.

== Career ==
=== Gazélec Ajaccio ===
El Hany was bornBorn in Sartène, France. His first experience in professional football was at the age of 19 when he joined Championnat de France amateur side Gazélec Ajaccio. his first season as a youth started slowly with just 1 appearance all season but in the 2008-09 season he got a taste for first team football playing 18 games and scoring once. In his final season to be at Gazélec Ajaccio, El Hany played 33 from 34 games and scored 7 times helping his team to 2nd place in the CFA groupe B.

=== AC Ajaccio ===
At the start of the 2010-11 season, El Hany secured a free transfer to rival team AC Ajaccio. In his first season at AC Ajaccio, El Hany started a total of 11 games whilst coming on as a substitute a further 13 times. Although he didn't score, he did help Ajaccios promotion back to the Ligue 1. El Hany also played a further 5 games for AC Ajaccio in the Coupe de France and scored once.

== Career statistics ==
Appearances and goals by club, season and competition
Club	Season	League			National cup (Note: Includes Coupe de France.)		League cup (Note: Includes Coupe de la Ligue.)		Total	
Club	Season	Division	Apps	Goals	Apps	Goals	Apps	Goals	Apps	Goals
Gazélec Ajaccio	2008–09	Championnat de France Amateur								
Gazélec Ajaccio	2009–10	Championnat de France Amateur								
Ajaccio	2010–11	Ligue 2	24	0						
Ajaccio	2011–12	Ligue 1	1	0						
Ajaccio	Total		25	0						
FC Brussels	2012–13	Belgian Second Division	6	0						
White Star Bruxelles	2013–14	Belgian Second Division	11	1						
White Star Bruxelles	2013–14	Belgian Second Division	10	1						
White Star Bruxelles	Total		21	2						
Career total			52	2						
