= Fabrice Ngah =

Cameroonian footballer (born 1997)

Personal information
- Full name: Fabrice Gael Ngah
- Date of birth: 16 October 1997 (age 29)
- Place of birth: Yaoundé, Cameroon
- Height: 1.75 m (5 ft 9 in)
- Position: Leftback

Team information
- Current team: Charlotte Independence
- Number: 2

Youth career
- 2009–2014: Astres

Senior career*
Years	Team	Apps	(Gls)
2014–2016	Astres		
2016–2017	UMS de Loum		
2017–2018	DHJ	23	(1)
2019–2021	Raja Club Athletic	35	(2)
2021	Ceramica Cleopatra	11	(0)
2022–2023	Canon Yaoundé		
2023–	Charlotte Independence	83	(8)

International career^{‡}
2014–	Cameroon	2	(0)
- * Club domestic league appearances and goals as of 31 October 2026 ‡ National team caps and goals as of 16 November 2020

Fabrice Gael Ngah (born 16 October 1997) is a Cameroonian professional footballer who plays as a left-back for USL League One side Charlotte Independence.

== Club career ==
A youth product of Jeunes Académie Sportive de Ngoulmekong, Ngah moved to Morocco with DHJ and then transferred to Raja Club Athletic in 2018.

== International career ==
Ngah debuted for the Cameroon national team in a 1–0 win over Central African Republic on 3 December 2014.
