= Badr Benoun =

Moroccan footballer (born 1993)

Badr Benoun بدر بانون
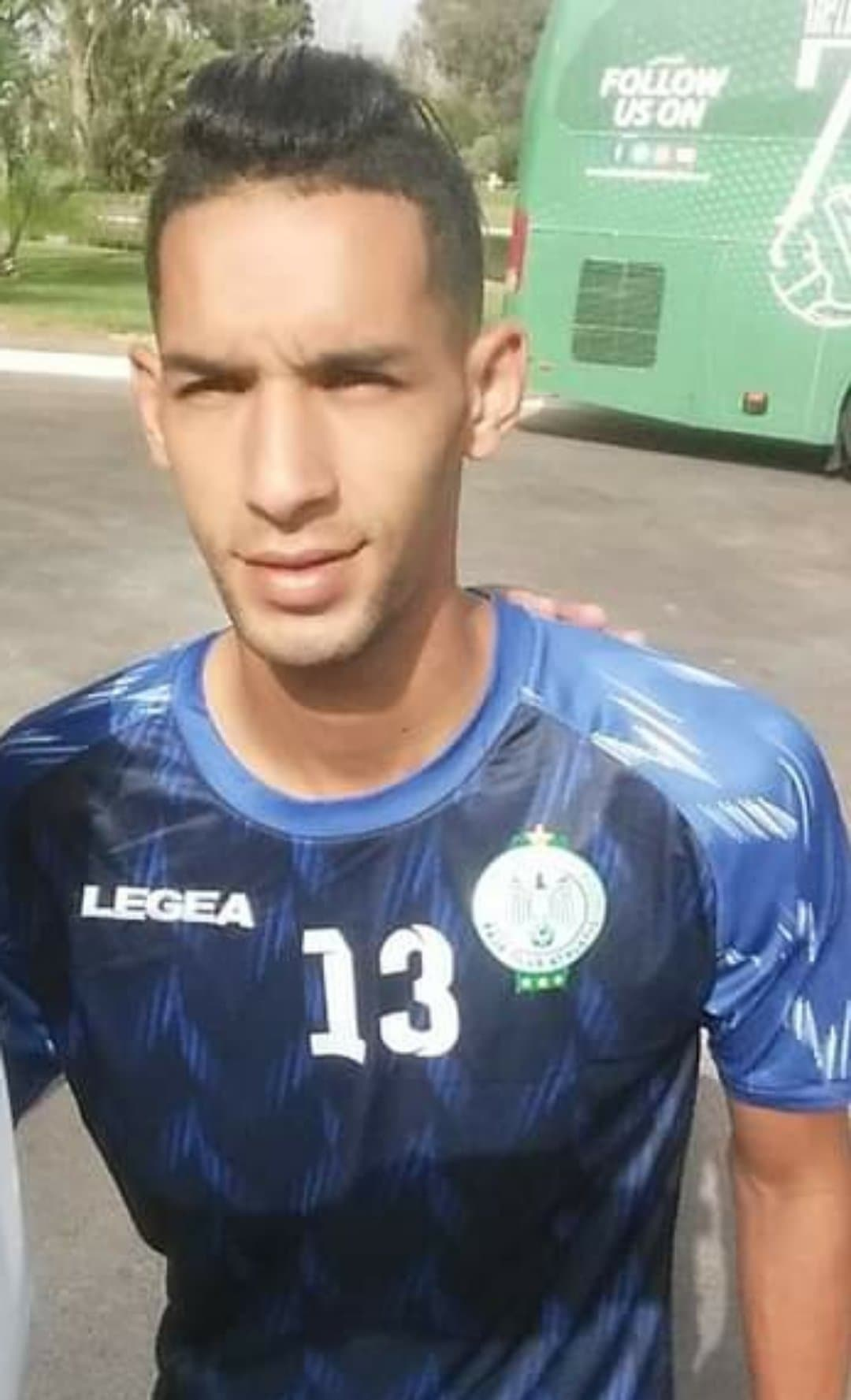
- Benoun with Raja in 2021

Personal information
- Full name: Badr Benoun
- Date of birth: 30 September 1993 (age 33)
- Place of birth: Casablanca, Morocco
- Height: 1.93 m (6 ft 4 in)
- Position: Centre-back

Team information
- Current team: Raja CA
- Number: 13

Youth career
- 2011–2013: Raja CA

Senior career*
Years	Team	Apps	(Gls)
2013–2020	Raja CA	183	(17)
2014	→ Wydad de Fès (loan)	16	(0)
2014–2015	→ RS Berkane (loan)	28	(2)
2020–2022	Al Ahly	52	(4)
2022–2025	Qatar SC	64	(9)
2025–	Raja CA	23	(0)

International career
2017–	Morocco A'	18	(5)
2017–2022	Morocco	6	(0)
Medal record
Representing Morocco
Islamic Solidarity Games
Winner	2013 Indonesia
African Nations Championship
Winner	2018 Morocco
- * Club domestic league appearances and goals as of 13 September 2026

Badr Benoun (also spelt as Badr Banoune; Arabic: بدر بانون; born 30 September 1993) is a Moroccan professional footballer who plays as a centre-back and captains Botola side Raja CA.

== Club career ==
=== Debut ===
Benoun started his career playing for Raja Club Athletic. He won his first trophy with the club after finishing champion of the 2012–13 Botola. He was loaned out to Wydad de Fès to gain more playing time and experience. He played a total of 16 games before being loaned out again to RS Berkane. In 2015 he was called back to the club.

=== Raja CA ===
He won his second trophy after defeating Difaâ Hassani El Jadidi in the 2017 Moroccan Throne Cup after scoring a penalty.

In 2018, Raja qualified to play the 2018 CAF Confederation Cup. Raja entered the knock-out stages after topping the group stages. Raja reached to the finals and won the cup. This guaranteed them a spot in the 2019 CAF Super Cup. Raja was to face Espérance Sportive de Tunis the match was to take place in Doha. Benoun scored a goal in the 64th minute and won the cup. He also won the 2019–20 Botola and the 2019–20 Arab Club Champions Cup. He spent five seasons with the club before signing with Al Ahly.

=== Al Ahly ===
In November 2020, he joined Egyptian club Al Ahly. He represented the club during the FIFA Club World Cup and secured the bronze medal after a victory against Brazilian side Palmeiras. Soon after, he won the 2020 Egypt Cup, the 2021 CAF Champions League and the 2020 CAF Super Cup. He later went on to defeat his former team Raja on penalties to win the 2021 CAF Super Cup.

=== Qatar SC ===
In July 2022, he signed for Qatari club Qatar SC on a three-year deal.

=== Return to Raja CA ===
On 17 May 2025, Benoun returned to his childhood club and signed a two-year contract.

== International career ==
In 2013, Benoun won a gold medal at the 2013 Islamic Solidarity Games after defeating Indonesia 2–1 in the final.

On 7 October 2017, he made his international debut for Morocco in a 2018 FIFA World Cup qualification match against Gabon at the Stade Mohammed V in Casablanca, replacing Medhi Benatia in a 3–0 victory.

In May 2018, he was named in Morocco's 23-man squad for the 2018 FIFA World Cup in Russia.

On 10 January 2022, Benoun was replaced by Achraf Bencharki for the 2021 Africa Cup of Nations after suffering an injury that would limit his participation in the competition.

On 10 November 2022, he was named in Morocco's 26-man squad for the 2022 FIFA World Cup in Qatar.

== Career statistics ==
Scores and results list Morocco's goal tally first.

No.	Date	Venue	Opponent	Score	Result	Competition
1.	13 August 2017	Alexandria Stadium, Alexandria, Egypt	Egypt	1–1	1–1	2018 African Nations Championship qualification
2.	19 October 2019	Stade Municipal, Berkane, Morocco	Algeria	1–0	3–0	2020 African Nations Championship qualification
3.	1 December 2021	Al Janoub Stadium, Al Wakrah, Qatar	Palestine	4–0	4–0	2021 FIFA Arab Cup
4.	4 December 2021	Ahmed bin Ali Stadium, Al Rayyan, Qatar	Jordan	2–0	4–0	2021 FIFA Arab Cup
5.	11 December 2021	Al Thumama Stadium, Al Thumana, Qatar	Algeria	2–2	2–2	2021 FIFA Arab Cup

== Honours ==
Raja CA

- Botola Pro: 2012–13, 2019–20
- Moroccan Throne Cup: 2017
- CAF Confederation Cup: 2018
- CAF Super Cup: 2019

Al Ahly

- Egypt Cup: 2019–20
- CAF Champions League: 2020–21
- CAF Super Cup: 2020, 2021
- FIFA Club World Cup: 2021 (Bronze Medal)

Morocco

- Islamic Solidarity Games: 2013
- African Nations Championship: 2018

Individual

- Botola Pro Best Defender: 2017–18
- African Nations Championship Team of the Tournament: 2018
- FIFA Arab Cup Team of the Tournament: 2021

Orders

- Order of the Throne: 2022
