= Sanad Al Warfali =

Libyan footballer (born 1992)

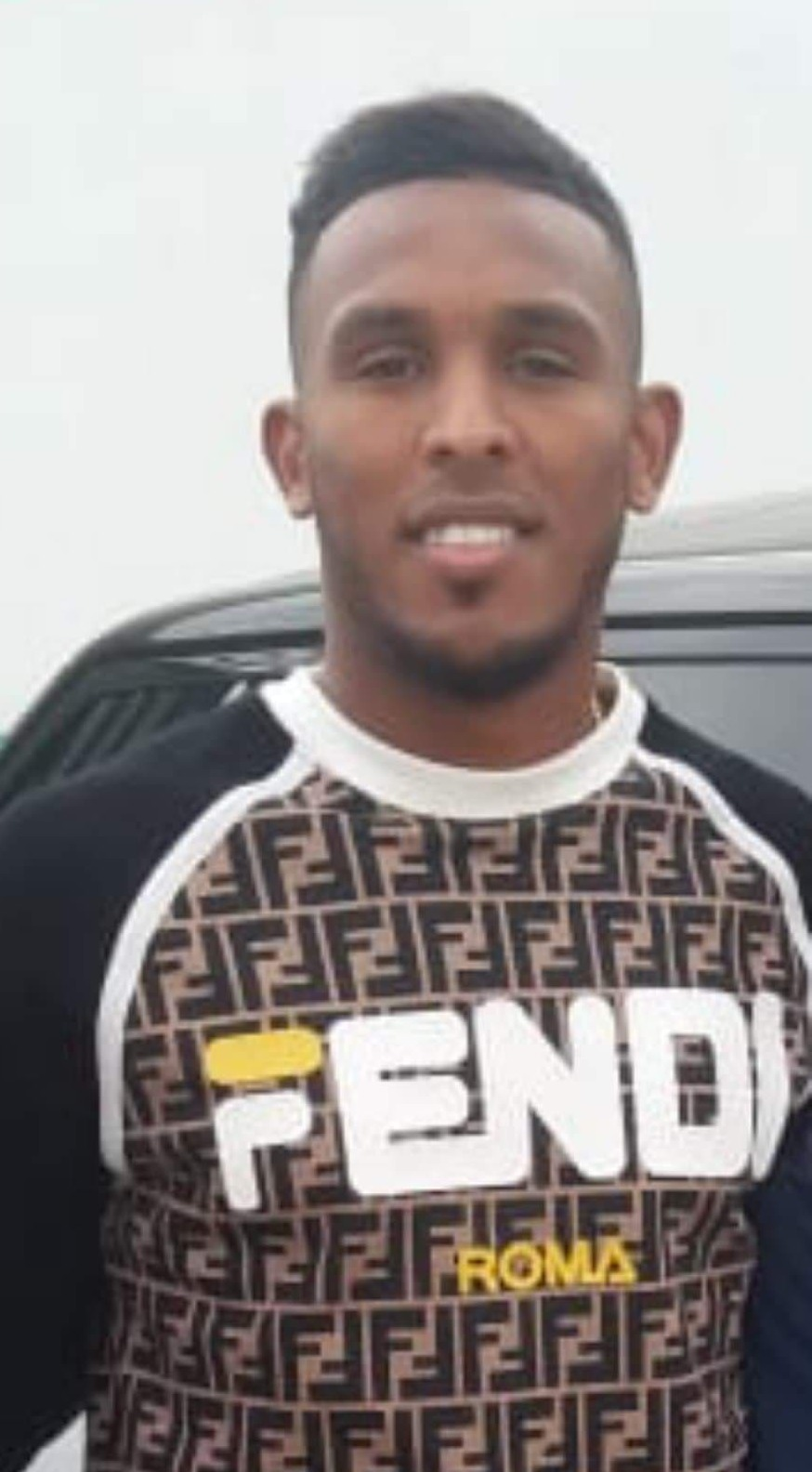
- Sanad Al Warfali in 2020

Personal information
- Full name: Sanad Masoud Mohammed; Masoud Al Warfali
- Date of birth: 17 May 1992 (age 34)
- Place of birth: Tripoli, Libya
- Height: 1.82 m (6 ft 0 in)
- Position: Defender

Team information
- Current team: Al Ahli SC (Tripoli)
- Number: 8

Senior career*
| Years | Team | Apps | (Gls) |
| 2011–2014 | Al-Wahda | | |
| 2014–2019 | Al Ahli SC | 24 | (3) |
| 2018–2019 | → Raja Casablanca (loan) | 11 | (0) |
| 2019–2021 | Raja Casablanca | 35 | (1) |
| 2021–2023 | Al-Ittihad Club (Tripoli) | 35 | (1) |
| 2023– | Al Ahli SC | 14 | (02) |

International career^{‡}
| 2015– | Libya | 35 | (5) |
- * Club domestic league appearances and goals as of 3 July 2021 ‡ National team caps and goals as of 7 September 2021

Sanad Masoud Mohammed Masoud Al Warfali (also spelled Al-Ouarfali; Arabic: سند مسعود محمد مسعود الورفلي; born 17 May 1992) is a Libyan footballer who plays as a defender for Al Ahli SC (Tripoli) and he is retired from Libya national team.

== International career ==
Al Warfali scored his first international goal in a 1–1 draw with Morocco. The match was a 2017 African Cup of Nations qualifier.

=== International goals ===
Scores and results list Libya's goal tally first.

| No. | Date | Venue | Opponent | Score | Result | Competition |
|---|---|---|---|---|---|---|
| 1. | 3 June 2016 | Stade Olympique de Radès, Radès, Tunisia | Morocco | 1–1 | 1–1 | 2017 Africa Cup of Nations qualification |
| 2. | 11 October 2019 | Honneur Stadium, Oujda, Morocco | Morocco | 1–1 | 1–1 | Friendly |
| 3. | 19 November 2019 | Stade Mustapha Ben Jannet, Monastir, Tunisia | Tanzania | 1–1 | 2–1 | 2021 Africa Cup of Nations qualification |
| 4. | 11 November 2020 | Stade Olympique de Radès, Radès, Tunisia | Equatorial Guinea | 1–1 | 2–3 | 2021 Africa Cup of Nations qualification |
| 5. | 1 September 2021 | Martyrs of February Stadium, Benina, Libya | Gabon | 2–1 | 2–1 | 2022 FIFA World Cup qualification |
| 6. | 16 November 2021 | Martyrs of February Stadium, Benina, Libya | Angola | 1–0 | 1–1 | 2022 FIFA World Cup qualification |
