= EJS Casablanca =

Moroccan football club

- Full name: Étoile Jeunesse Sportive de Casablanca
- Founded: 1942; 84 years ago
- Stadium: Père Jégo Stadium
- Capacity: 10,000
- League: Amateurs I
- 2024-25: Amateurs I, 12th of 16
Home colours	Away colours

Étoile de Casablanca is a Moroccan football club currently playing in the fourth division. The club is based in the city of Casablanca. It was founded in 1942 and plays their home games at the Père Jégo Stadium.

== Honours ==
- Botola Pro:
  - Winner (1): 1959
- Moroccan Super Cup
  - Runners-up (1): 1959
