= Abderrahim Achchakir =

Moroccan footballer

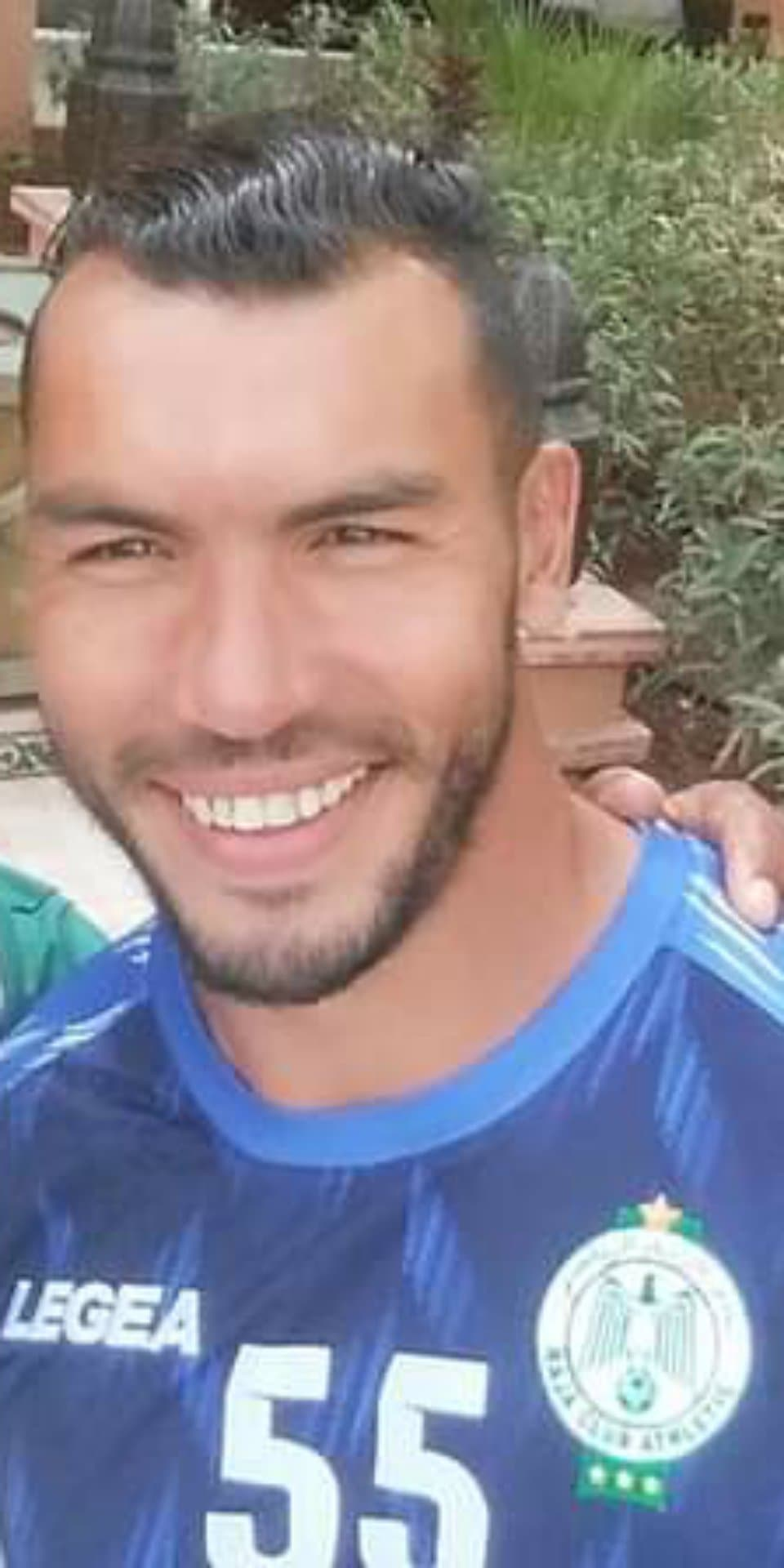
- Abderrahim Achchakir in 2019

Personal information
- Full name: Abderrahim Achchakir
- Date of birth: December 15, 1986 (age 39)
- Place of birth: Mohammedia, Morocco
- Height: 1.79 m (5 ft 10 1/2 in)
- Positions: Defensive midfielder; defender

Team information
- Current team: Chabab Mohammedia
- Number: 55

Senior career*
Years	Team	Apps	(Gls)
2007–2010	Chabab Mohammedia	52	(8)
2010–2012	Difaa El Jadida	27	(1)
2012–2017	FAR	148	(23)
2017–2021	Raja CA	143	(5)
2021–	Chabab Mohammedia	0	(0)

International career^{‡}
2013–2016	Morocco	10	(0)
- * Club domestic league appearances and goals as of February 2019 ‡ National team caps and goals as of 22:00, January 23, 2012 (UTC)

Abderrahim Achchakir (born December 15, 1986) is a Moroccan footballer who plays for Chabab Mohammedia and the Morocco national team. He was a member of the Morocco national team at the 2013 Africa Cup of Nations in South Africa.

== Honors ==
=== Club ===
Raja Casablanca

- Botola: 2019–20
- Coupe du Trône: 2017
- CAF Confederation Cup: 2018, 2021
- CAF Super Cup: 2019
