= Mohamed Douik =

Moroccan professional footballer

Personal information
- Date of birth: 1 March 1999 (age 27)
- Place of birth: Morocco
- Height: 1.76 m (5 ft 9 in)
- Position: Midfielder

Youth career
- –2019: Raja Casablanca

Senior career*
Years	Team	Apps	(Gls)
2019–2021	Raja Casablanca	7	(0)
2020–2021	→ Renaissance Zemamra (loan)	14	(2)
2021–	SCC Mohammédia	7	(0)
2022	→ Rapide Oued Zem (loan)	10	(0)
- * Club domestic league appearances and goals as of 1 January 2023

Mohamed Douik is a Moroccan professional footballer who plays as a midfielder.
