= 2018 CAF Confederation Cup qualifying rounds =

- Dates: 9 February – 18 April 2019

In international football, the 2018 CAF Confederation Cup qualifying rounds were played from 9 February to 18 April 2018. A total of 70 teams competed in the qualifying rounds to decide the 16 places in the group stage of the 2018 CAF Confederation Cup.

== Draw ==
The draw for the preliminary round and first round was held on 13 December 2017 at the CAF headquarters in Cairo, Egypt.

The entry round of the 54 teams entered into the draw is determined by their performances in the CAF competitions for the previous five seasons (CAF 5-year ranking points shown in parentheses).

Entry round	First round (10 teams)	Preliminary round (44 teams)
Teams	(Egypt) Zamalek (43 pts); (Algeria) USM Alger (35 pts); (South Africa) SuperSport United (20 pts); (Tunisia) Club Africain (15 pts); (Sudan) Al-Hilal Al-Ubayyid (10 pts); (Nigeria) Enyimba (8 pts); (Zambia) Nkana (2 pts); (Democratic Republic of the Congo) DC Motema Pembe; (Morocco) Raja Casablanca; (Sudan) Al-Ahly Shendi	(Egypt) Al-Masry; (Tunisia) US Ben Guerdane; (Democratic Republic of the Congo) AS Maniema Union; (Algeria) CR Belouizdad; (South Africa) Cape Town City; (Morocco) RS Berkane; (Ivory Coast) AS Tanda; (Ivory Coast) Africa Sports; (Zambia) Green Buffaloes; (Republic of the Congo) CARA Brazzaville; (Republic of the Congo) CS La Mancha; (Mali) Djoliba (Note: The teams from Mali were listed as Mali 1 (Onze Créateurs) and Mali 2 (Djoliba) at the time of the qualifying round draw.); (Mali) Onze Créateurs; (Nigeria) Akwa United; (Cameroon) New Star; (Libya) Al-Ittihad Tripoli; (Ghana) Asante Kotoko; (Tanzania) Simba; (Angola) Petro de Luanda; (Ethiopia) Welayta Dicha; (Benin) Energie (Note: The identity of the team from Benin was not known at the time of the qualifying round draw.); (Botswana) Jwaneng Galaxy; (Burkina Faso) Étoile Filante; (Burundi) Olympique Star; (Comoros) Ngazi Sport; (Djibouti) Gendarmerie Nationale; (Equatorial Guinea) Deportivo Niefang; (Gabon) AS Mangasport; (The Gambia) Banjul Hawks; (Guinea) Hafia; (Kenya) AFC Leopards; (Liberia) ELWA United; (Madagascar) Fosa Juniors; (Malawi) Masters Security; (Mauritania) FC Nouadhibou; (Mauritius) AS Port-Louis 2000; (Mozambique) Costa do Sol; (Niger) Sahel; (Rwanda) APR; (Senegal) Mbour Petite-Côte; (Seychelles) Anse Réunion; (South Sudan) Al-Hilal Juba; (Eswatini) Young Buffaloes; (Zanzibar) Zimamoto

== Format ==
In the qualifying rounds, each tie was played on a home-and-away two-legged basis. If the aggregate score was tied after the second leg, the away goals rule would be applied, and if still tied, extra time would not be played, and the penalty shoot-out would be used to determine the winner (Regulations III. 13 & 14).

== Schedule ==
The schedule of each round was as follows (matches scheduled in midweek in italics).

Round	First leg	Second leg
Preliminary round	9–11 February 2018	20–21 February 2018
First round	6–7 March 2018	16–18 March 2018
Play-off round	6–8 April 2018	17–18 April 2018

== Bracket ==
The bracket of the draw was announced by the CAF on 13 December 2017. The 16 winners of the first round advanced to the play-off round, where they were joined by the 16 losers of the Champions League first round.

Preliminary round
1	(Angola) Petro de Luanda	5	0	5
4	(Malawi) Masters Security	0	0	0
3	(South Africa) SuperSport United	Bye
2

First round
(Angola) Petro de Luanda	0	1	1
(South Africa) SuperSport United	0	2	2

Preliminary round
1	(Mozambique) Costa do Sol	1	1	2
4	(Botswana) Jwaneng Galaxy	0	0	0
3	(Eswatini) Young Buffaloes	0	0	0
2	(South Africa) Cape Town City	1	1	2

First round
(Mozambique) Costa do Sol	0	2	2 (a)
(South Africa) Cape Town City	1	1	2

Preliminary round
1	(Benin) Energie	1	1	2
4	(Guinea) Hafia	0	1	1
3	(Nigeria) Enyimba	Bye
2

First round
(Benin) Energie	0	2	2
(Nigeria) Enyimba	2	3	5

Preliminary round
1	(Mali) Djoliba	—	—	w/o
4	(Liberia) ELWA United	—	—
3	(Rwanda) APR	4	2	6
2	(Seychelles) Anse Réunion	0	1	1

First round
(Mali) Djoliba	1	1	2 (a)
(Rwanda) APR	0	2	2

Preliminary round
1	(Comoros) Ngazi Sport	1	1	2
4	(Mauritius) AS Port-Louis 2000	1	4	5
3	(Kenya) AFC Leopards	1	0	1
2	(Madagascar) Fosa Juniors	1	0	1 (a)

First round
(Mauritius) AS Port-Louis 2000	0	0	0
(Madagascar) Fosa Juniors	2	1	3

Preliminary round
1	(Gabon) AS Mangasport	0	1	1
4	(Democratic Republic of the Congo) AS Maniema Union	1	1	2
3	(Algeria) USM Alger	Bye
2

First round
(Democratic Republic of the Congo) AS Maniema Union	2	1	3
(Algeria) USM Alger	2	1	3 (a)

Preliminary round
1	(Burundi) Olympique Star	0	1	1
4	(Burkina Faso) Étoile Filante	0	0	0
3	(Sudan) Al-Hilal Al-Ubayyid	Bye
2

First round
(Burundi) Olympique Star	0	0	0
(Sudan) Al-Hilal Al-Ubayyid	0	6	6

Preliminary round
1	(Democratic Republic of the Congo) DC Motema Pembe	Bye
4
3	(Cameroon) New Star	2	0	2
2	(Equatorial Guinea) Deportivo Niefang	1	1	2 (a)

First round
(Democratic Republic of the Congo) DC Motema Pembe	1	0	1
(Equatorial Guinea) Deportivo Niefang	1	1	2

Preliminary round
1	(Ivory Coast) AS Tanda	0	0	0
4	(Republic of the Congo) CS La Mancha	0	1	1
3	(Sudan) Al-Ahly Shendi	Bye
2

First round
(Republic of the Congo) CS La Mancha	3	1	4
(Sudan) Al-Ahly Shendi	0	2	2

Preliminary round
1	(Libya) Al-Ittihad Tripoli	1	3	4
4	(Niger) Sahel	0	0	0
3	(Nigeria) Akwa United	1	2	3
2	(The Gambia) Banjul Hawks	2	0	2

First round
(Libya) Al-Ittihad Tripoli	1	0	1 (2 p)
(Nigeria) Akwa United	0	1	1 (3 p)

Preliminary round
1	(Ghana) Asante Kotoko	1	0	1 (6 p)
4	(Republic of the Congo) CARA Brazzaville	0	1	1 (7 p)
3	(Tunisia) US Ben Guerdane	—	—	w/o
2	(South Sudan) Al-Hilal Juba	—	—

First round
(Republic of the Congo) CARA Brazzaville	3	1	4
(Tunisia) US Ben Guerdane	0	3	3

Preliminary round
1	(Mali) Onze Créateurs	1	0	1
4	(Algeria) CR Belouizdad	1	2	3
3	(Zambia) Nkana	Bye
2

First round
(Algeria) CR Belouizdad	3	0	3
(Zambia) Nkana	0	1	1

Preliminary round
1	(Tanzania) Simba	4	1	5
4	(Djibouti) Gendarmerie Nationale	0	0	0
3	(Egypt) Al-Masry	4	1	5
2	(Zambia) Green Buffaloes	0	2	2

First round
(Tanzania) Simba	2	0	2
(Egypt) Al-Masry	2	0	2 (a)

Preliminary round
1	(Morocco) RS Berkane	2	1	3
4	(Senegal) Mbour Petite-Côte	1	1	2
3	(Tunisia) Club Africain	Bye
2

First round
(Morocco) RS Berkane	3	1	4
(Tunisia) Club Africain	1	0	1

Preliminary round
1	(Morocco) Raja Casablanca	Bye
4
3	(Ivory Coast) Africa Sports	1	0	1
2	(Mauritania) FC Nouadhibou	1	1	2

First round
(Morocco) Raja Casablanca	1	4	5
(Mauritania) FC Nouadhibou	1	2	3

Preliminary round
1	(Zanzibar) Zimamoto	1	0	1
4	(Ethiopia) Welayta Dicha	1	1	2
3	(Egypt) Zamalek	Bye
2

First round
(Ethiopia) Welayta Dicha	2	1	3 (4 p)
(Egypt) Zamalek	1	2	3 (3 p)

== Preliminary round ==
The preliminary round included the 44 teams that did not receive byes to the first round.

Team 1	Agg.	Team 2	1st leg	2nd leg
Petro de Luanda (Angola)	5–0	(Malawi) Masters Security	5–0	0–0
Young Buffaloes (Eswatini)	0–2	(South Africa) Cape Town City	0–1	0–1
Costa do Sol (Mozambique)	2–0	(Botswana) Jwaneng Galaxy	1–0	1–0
Energie (Benin)	2–1	(Guinea) Hafia	1–0	1–1
APR (Rwanda)	6–1	(Seychelles) Anse Réunion	4–0	2–1
Djoliba (Mali)	w/o (Note: Djoliba won on walkover after ELWA United withdrew.)	(Liberia) ELWA United	—	—
AFC Leopards (Kenya)	1–1 (a)	(Madagascar) Fosa Juniors	1–1	0–0
Ngazi Sport (Comoros)	2–5	(Mauritius) AS Port-Louis 2000	1–1	1–4
AS Mangasport (Gabon)	1–2	(Democratic Republic of the Congo) AS Maniema Union	0–1	1–1
Olympique Star (Burundi)	1–0	(Burkina Faso) Étoile Filante	0–0	1–0
New Star (Cameroon)	2–2 (a)	(Equatorial Guinea) Deportivo Niefang	2–1	0–1
AS Tanda (Ivory Coast)	0–1	(Republic of the Congo) CS La Mancha	0–0	0–1
Akwa United (Nigeria)	3–2	(The Gambia) Banjul Hawks	1–2	2–0
Al-Ittihad Tripoli (Libya)	4–0	(Niger) Sahel	1–0	3–0
US Ben Guerdane (Tunisia)	w/o (Note: US Ben Guerdane won on walkover after Al-Hilal Juba failed to arrive for the first leg.)	(South Sudan) Al-Hilal Juba	—	—
Asante Kotoko (Ghana)	1–1 (6–7 p)	(Republic of the Congo) CARA Brazzaville	1–0	0–1
Onze Créateurs (Mali)	1–3	(Algeria) CR Belouizdad	1–1	0–2
Al-Masry (Egypt)	5–2	(Zambia) Green Buffaloes	4–0	1–2
Simba (Tanzania)	5–0	(Djibouti) Gendarmerie Nationale	4–0	1–0
RS Berkane (Morocco)	3–2	(Senegal) Mbour Petite-Côte	2–1	1–1
Africa Sports (Ivory Coast)	1–2	(Mauritania) FC Nouadhibou	1–1	0–1
Zimamoto (Zanzibar)	1–2	(Ethiopia) Welayta Dicha	1–1	0–1

Notes:

10 February 2018
16:00 UTC+1

Petro de Luanda (Angola)	5–0	(Malawi) Masters Security
Mano-Mano 40'; Tony 74', 77', 82'; Diney 90+3'	Report

Estádio 11 de Novembro, Luanda
Referee: Jonas Shongedi (Namibia)
20 February 2018
14:30 UTC+2

Masters Security (Malawi)	0–0	(Angola) Petro de Luanda
	Report

Kamuzu Stadium, Blantyre
Referee: Elly Ally Sasii (Tanzania)

Petro de Luanda won 5–0 on aggregate.

10 February 2018
16:00 UTC+2

Young Buffaloes (Eswatini)	0–1	(South Africa) Cape Town City
	Report	Akosah-Bempah 81'

Somhlolo National Stadium, Lobamba
Referee: João Goma (Angola)
20 February 2018
19:30 UTC+2

Cape Town City (South Africa)	1–0	(Eswatini) Young Buffaloes
Ralani 57'	Report

Athlone Stadium, Cape Town
Referee: Dharamveer Hurbungs (Mauritius)

Cape Town City won 2–0 on aggregate.

10 February 2018
15:30 UTC+2

Costa do Sol (Mozambique)	1–0	(Botswana) Jwaneng Galaxy
Tisdell 88'	Report

Estádio do Zimpeto, Maputo
Referee: Abdoul Kanoso (Madagascar)
21 February 2018
19:00 UTC+2

Jwaneng Galaxy (Botswana)	0–1	(Mozambique) Costa do Sol
	Report	Isac 20'

Botswana National Stadium, Gaborone
Referee: José Álvaro Clemente Chitumba (Angola)

Costa do Sol won 2–0 on aggregate.

10 February 2018
16:00 UTC+1

Energie (Benin)	1–0	(Guinea) Hafia
Santou 42'	Report

Stade de l'Amitié, Cotonou
Referee: Kokou Fagla (Togo)
20 February 2018
16:30 UTC+0

Hafia (Guinea)	1–1	(Benin) Energie
Ab. Camara 10'	Report	Guera 90'

Stade du 28 Septembre, Conakry
Referee: António Rodrigues (Cape Verde)

Energie won 2–1 on aggregate.

11 February 2018
15:30 UTC+2

APR (Rwanda)	4–0	(Seychelles) Anse Réunion
Bizimana 12', 71', 90+1'; Bigirimana 79'	Report

Amahoro Stadium, Kigali
Referee: Lemma Nigussie (Ethiopia)
20 February 2018
17:30 UTC+4

Anse Réunion (Seychelles)	1–2	(Rwanda) APR
Rose 34'	Report	Rugwiro 47'; Bigirimana 62'

Stade Linité, Victoria
Referee: Anthony Ogwayo (Kenya)

APR won 6–1 on aggregate.

9 February 2018
19:00 UTC+0

Djoliba (Mali)	Cancelled	(Liberia) ELWA United
	Report

Stade Modibo Kéïta, Bamako
Referee: Mohamed Cheikh Mhamed Vall (Mauritania)
20 February 2018
16:00 UTC+0

ELWA United (Liberia)	Cancelled	(Mali) Djoliba
	Report

Antoinette Tubman Stadium, Monrovia
Referee: Allou Franc Eric Miessan (Ivory Coast)

Djoliba won on walkover after ELWA United withdrew.

11 February 2018
15:00 UTC+3

AFC Leopards (Kenya)	1–1	(Madagascar) Fosa Juniors
Arkoh 3'	Report	Andrianinosy 15'

Bukhungu Stadium, Kakamega
Referee: Omar Artan (Somalia)
21 February 2018
14:30 UTC+3

Fosa Juniors (Madagascar)	0–0	(Kenya) AFC Leopards
	Report

Rabemananjara Stadium, Mahajanga
Referee: Allister Barra (Seychelles)

1–1 on aggregate. Fosa Juniors won on away goals.

10 February 2018
15:00 UTC+3

Ngazi Sport (Comoros)	1–1	(Mauritius) AS Port-Louis 2000
Fanomezantsoa 66'	Report	Ernest 2'

Stade de Moroni, Moroni
Referee: Dennis Nguluwe (Malawi)
20 February 2018
15:15 UTC+4

AS Port-Louis 2000 (Mauritius)	4–1	(Comoros) Ngazi Sport
Lafoudre 41', 81', 89'; Botlar 56'	Report	Zayed 88'

Stade George V, Curepipe
Referee: Kutlwano Leso (Botswana)

AS Port-Louis 2000 won 5–2 on aggregate.

10 February 2018
15:30 UTC+1

AS Mangasport (Gabon)	0–1	(Democratic Republic of the Congo) AS Maniema Union
	Report	Amongo 83'

Stade de Franceville, Franceville
Referee: Mandeng Cosmas (Cameroon)
21 February 2018
15:30 UTC+2

AS Maniema Union (Democratic Republic of the Congo)	1–1	(Gabon) AS Mangasport
Mbambu 18' (pen.)	Report	Hassan 37'

Stade Joseph Kabila, Kindu
Referee: Prince Arcy Dongombe (Central African Republic)

AS Maniema Union won 2–1 on aggregate.

10 February 2018
15:00 UTC+2

Olympique Star (Burundi)	0–0	(Burkina Faso) Étoile Filante
	Report

Prince Louis Rwagasore Stadium, Bujumbura
Referee: Abdoul Karim Twagirumukiza (Rwanda)
21 February 2018
15:30 UTC+0

Étoile Filante (Burkina Faso)	0–1	(Burundi) Olympique Star
	Report	Saidi 56'

Stade du 4 Août, Ouagadougou
Referee: Harouna Coulibaly (Mali)

Olympique Star won 1–0 on aggregate.

10 February 2018
15:30 UTC+1

New Star (Cameroon)	2–1	(Equatorial Guinea) Deportivo Niefang
Ngongang 35', 83'	Report	Diarra 87'

Limbe Stadium, Limbe
Referee: Isidore Essono Nze (Gabon)
20 February 2018
16:00 UTC+1

Deportivo Niefang (Equatorial Guinea)	1–0	(Cameroon) New Star
Asu 29'	Report

Estadio de Bata, Bata
Referee: Quadri Ololade Adebimpe (Nigeria)

2–2 on aggregate. Deportivo Niefang won on away goals.

10 February 2018
16:00 UTC+0

AS Tanda (Ivory Coast)	0–0	(Republic of the Congo) CS La Mancha
	Report

Stade Robert Champroux, Abidjan
Referee: Reginald Lathbridge (Ghana)
20 February 2018
15:30 UTC+1

CS La Mancha (Republic of the Congo)	1–0	(Ivory Coast) AS Tanda
Mbenza 51'	Report

Stade Municipal, Pointe-Noire
Referee: Alhadi Mahamat (Chad)

CS La Mancha won 1–0 on aggregate.

11 February 2018
16:00 UTC+1

Akwa United (Nigeria)	1–2	(The Gambia) Banjul Hawks
Mbaoma 72'	Report	Jallow 11'; Charty 34'

Godswill Akpabio International Stadium, Uyo
Referee: Daudu Williams (Sierra Leone)
21 February 2018
18:00 UTC+0

Banjul Hawks (The Gambia)	0–2	(Nigeria) Akwa United
	Report	Olisema 38', 46'

Independence Stadium, Bakau
Referee: Ousmane Camara (Guinea)

Akwa United won 3–2 on aggregate.

10 February 2018
18:00 UTC+1

Al-Ittihad Tripoli (Libya)	1–0	(Niger) Sahel
Eisa 90'	Report

Stade Taïeb Mhiri, Sfax (Tunisia) (Note: Teams from Libya are not allowed to host their home matches in their country due to security concerns.)
Referee: Haithem Kossaï (Tunisia)
21 February 2018
16:00 UTC+1

Sahel (Niger)	0–3	(Libya) Al-Ittihad Tripoli
	Report	Alaqoub 17', 32'; Tubal 25'

Stade Général-Seyni-Kountché, Niamey
Referee: Abderazzek Arab (Algeria)

Al-Ittihad Tripoli won 4–0 on aggregate.

10 February 2018
14:00 UTC+1

US Ben Guerdane (Tunisia)	Cancelled	(South Sudan) Al-Hilal Juba
	Report

Stade du 7 Mars, Ben Gardane
Referee: Mahmoud El Banna (Egypt)
21 February 2018
16:00 UTC+3

Al-Hilal Juba (South Sudan)	Cancelled	(Tunisia) US Ben Guerdane
	Report

Juba Stadium, Juba
Referee: Numbi Pierre Kibingo (DR Congo)

US Ben Guerdane won on walkover after Al-Hilal Juba failed to arrive for the first leg.

11 February 2018
15:00 UTC+0

Asante Kotoko (Ghana)	1–0	(Republic of the Congo) CARA Brazzaville
Mohammed 90+2' (pen.)	Report

Baba Yara Stadium, Kumasi
Referee: Issa Sy (Senegal)
21 February 2018
15:30 UTC+1

CARA Brazzaville (Republic of the Congo)	1–0	(Ghana) Asante Kotoko
Ondongo 38'	Report
Penalties
Ondongo (penalty missed); Kibongani (penalty missed); Okiélé (penalty missed); Massa (penalty scored)	7–6	(penalty scored) Annan; (penalty missed) O. Owusu; (penalty missed) Frimpong; (penalty scored) Nafiu; (penalty scored) Mohammed; (penalty scored) Adams; (penalty missed) J. Owusu; (penalty scored) Opoku; (penalty scored) Mahama; (penalty missed) Boahene

Stade Alphonse Massemba-Débat, Brazzaville
Referee: Lebalang Martin Mokete (Lesotho)

1–1 on aggregate. CARA Brazzaville won 7–6 on penalties.

9 February 2018
16:30 UTC+0

Onze Créateurs (Mali)	1–1	(Algeria) CR Belouizdad
Samaké 40' (pen.)	Report	Bechou 61'

Stade Modibo Kéïta, Bamako
Referee: Mohamed Ali Moussa (Niger)
20 February 2018
17:00 UTC+1

CR Belouizdad (Algeria)	2–0	(Mali) Onze Créateurs
Bouchar 30'; Lakroum 69'	Report

Stade du 20-Août-1955, Algiers
Referee: Adil Zourak (Morocco)

CR Belouizdad won 3–1 on aggregate.

10 February 2018
19:30 UTC+2

Al-Masry (Egypt)	4–0	(Zambia) Green Buffaloes
Salah 14'; Bancé 40'; Koffi 56'; Issa 81'	Report

Al-Masry Club Stadium, Port Said
Attendance: 12,000
Referee: Mashood Ssali (Uganda)
20 February 2018
15:00 UTC+2

Green Buffaloes (Zambia)	2–1	(Egypt) Al-Masry
Katiba 10'; Kabamba 87'	Report	Gomaa 15'

Nkoloma Stadium, Lusaka
Referee: Joaquin Esono (Equatorial Guinea)

Al-Masry won 5–2 on aggregate.

11 February 2018
16:00 UTC+3

Simba (Tanzania)	4–0	(Djibouti) Gendarmerie Nationale
Hamisi 1'; Bocco 33', 45'; Okwi 90'	Report

National Stadium, Dar es Salaam
Referee: Alier Michael James (South Sudan)
20 February 2018
16:00 UTC+3

Gendarmerie Nationale (Djibouti)	0–1	(Tanzania) Simba
	Report	Okwi 53'

El Hadj Hassan Gouled Aptidon Stadium, Djibouti
Referee: Pacifique Ndabihawenimana (Burundi)

Simba won 5–0 on aggregate.

11 February 2018
18:30 UTC+0

RS Berkane (Morocco)	2–1	(Senegal) Mbour Petite-Côte
El Kaabi 63' (pen.); Laba 72'	Report	Sow 42'

Stade Municipal de Berkane, Berkane
Referee: Sidi Alioum (Cameroon)
21 February 2018
16:00 UTC+0

Mbour Petite-Côte (Senegal)	1–1	(Morocco) RS Berkane
Sow 43'	Report	El Kaabi 66'

Stade Caroline Faye, M'Bour
Referee: Boukari Ouedraogo (Burkina Faso)

RS Berkane won 3–2 on aggregate.

11 February 2018
16:00 UTC+0

Africa Sports (Ivory Coast)	1–1	(Mauritania) FC Nouadhibou
Thomas 42'	Report	Voullany 51'

Stade Félix Houphouët-Boigny, Abidjan
Referee: Lazard Tsiba (Congo)
21 February 2018
15:30 UTC+0

FC Nouadhibou (Mauritania)	1–0	(Ivory Coast) Africa Sports
Manu 61' (o.g.)	Report

Stade Municipal, Nouadhibou
Referee: Bakary Camara (Gambia)

FC Nouadhibou won 2–1 on aggregate.

11 February 2018
16:00 UTC+3

Zimamoto (Zanzibar)	1–1	(Ethiopia) Welayta Dicha
Ali 32'	Report	Djako 43'

Amaan Stadium, Zanzibar City
Referee: Hafiz Abdelghani Alamen (Sudan)
21 February 2018
16:00 UTC+3

Welayta Dicha (Ethiopia)	1–0	(Zanzibar) Zimamoto
Djako 28' (pen.)	Report

Hawassa International Stadium, Awasa
Referee: Souleiman Ahmed Djama (Djibouti)

Welayta Dicha won 2–1 on aggregate.

== First round ==
The first round included 32 teams: the 22 winners of the preliminary round, and the 10 teams that received byes to this round.

Team 1	Agg.	Team 2	1st leg	2nd leg
Petro de Luanda (Angola)	1–2	(South Africa) SuperSport United	0–0	1–2
Costa do Sol (Mozambique)	2–2 (a)	(South Africa) Cape Town City	0–1	2–1
Energie (Benin)	2–5	(Nigeria) Enyimba	0–2	2–3
Djoliba (Mali)	2–2 (a)	(Rwanda) APR	1–0	1–2
AS Port-Louis 2000 (Mauritius)	0–3	(Madagascar) Fosa Juniors	0–2	0–1
AS Maniema Union (Democratic Republic of the Congo)	3–3 (a)	(Algeria) USM Alger	2–2	1–1
Olympique Star (Burundi)	0–6	(Sudan) Al-Hilal Al-Ubayyid	0–0	0–6
DC Motema Pembe (Democratic Republic of the Congo)	1–2	(Equatorial Guinea) Deportivo Niefang	1–1	0–1
CS La Mancha (Republic of the Congo)	4–2	(Sudan) Al-Ahly Shendi	3–0	1–2
Al-Ittihad Tripoli (Libya)	1–1 (2–3 p)	(Nigeria) Akwa United	1–0	0–1
CARA Brazzaville (Republic of the Congo)	4–3	(Tunisia) US Ben Guerdane	3–0	1–3
CR Belouizdad (Algeria)	3–1	(Zambia) Nkana	3–0	0–1
Simba (Tanzania)	2–2 (a)	(Egypt) Al-Masry	2–2	0–0
RS Berkane (Morocco)	4–1	(Tunisia) Club Africain	3–1	1–0
Raja Casablanca (Morocco)	5–3	(Mauritania) FC Nouadhibou	1–1	4–2
Welayta Dicha (Ethiopia)	3–3 (4–3 p)	(Egypt) Zamalek	2–1	1–2

6 March 2018
16:00 UTC+1

Petro de Luanda (Angola)	0–0	(South Africa) SuperSport United
	Report

Estádio 11 de Novembro, Luanda
Referee: Simões Guambe (Mozambique)
16 March 2018
19:00 UTC+2

SuperSport United (South Africa)	2–1	(Angola) Petro de Luanda
Mnyamane 79', 83'	Report	Élio 49'

Lucas Masterpieces Moripe Stadium, Pretoria
Referee: Wisdom Chewe (Zambia)

SuperSport United won 2–1 on aggregate.

7 March 2018
19:00 UTC+2

Costa do Sol (Mozambique)	0–1	(South Africa) Cape Town City
	Report	Masina 65'

Estádio do Zimpeto, Maputo
Referee: Lebalang Martin Mokete (Lesotho)
18 March 2018
16:00 UTC+2

Cape Town City (South Africa)	1–2	(Mozambique) Costa do Sol
Kewuti 15'	Report	Tisdell 3'; Miocha 83'

Athlone Stadium, Cape Town
Referee: Belay Tadesse (Ethiopia)

2–2 on aggregate. Costa do Sol won on away goals.

7 March 2018
16:00 UTC+1

Energie (Benin)	0–2	(Nigeria) Enyimba
	Report	Santou 3' (o.g.); Oladepo 8'

Stade de l'Amitié, Cotonou
Referee: Mohamed Cheikh Mhamed Vall (Mauritania)
18 March 2018
16:00 UTC+1

Enyimba (Nigeria)	3–2	(Benin) Energie
Bashir 1'; Okonkwo 68', 90' (pen.)	Report	Elegbedé 62'; Odjouhassi 88'

U. J. Esuene Stadium, Calabar
Referee: Blaise Yuven Ngwa (Cameroon)

Enyimba won 5–2 on aggregate.

7 March 2018
17:00 UTC+0

Djoliba (Mali)	1–0	(Rwanda) APR
Niang 48'	Report

Stade Modibo Kéïta, Bamako
Referee: Fabricio Duarte (Cape Verde)
17 March 2018
15:30 UTC+2

APR (Rwanda)	2–1	(Mali) Djoliba
Bizimana 19'; Nshuti 75'	Report	Bagayoko 9'

Amahoro Stadium, Kigali
Referee: Idris Mehammed Osman (Eritrea)

2–2 on aggregate. Djoliba won on away goals.

7 March 2018
15:30 UTC+4

AS Port-Louis 2000 (Mauritius)	0–2	(Madagascar) Fosa Juniors
	Report	Andrianarimanana 35', 53'

Stade George V, Curepipe
Referee: Bilal Abdallah Ismael (Djibouti)
18 March 2018
14:30 UTC+3

Fosa Juniors (Madagascar)	1–0	(Mauritius) AS Port-Louis 2000
Razafindrakoto 63'	Report

Rabemananjara Stadium, Mahajanga
Referee: Elly Ally Sasii (Tanzania)

Fosa Juniors won 3–0 on aggregate.

7 March 2018
14:00 UTC+2

AS Maniema Union (Democratic Republic of the Congo)	2–2	(Algeria) USM Alger
Mbuka 45'; Mozinzi 51'	Report	Ardji 18'; Darfalou 29'

Stade Joseph Kabila, Kindu
Referee: Sabri Mohamed Fadul (Sudan)
18 March 2018
18:00 UTC+1

USM Alger (Algeria)	1–1	(Democratic Republic of the Congo) AS Maniema Union
Darfalou 82'	Report	Manzoki 90'

Omar Hamadi Stadium, Algiers
Referee: Jerry Yekeh (Liberia)

3–3 on aggregate. USM Alger won on away goals.

7 March 2018
15:00 UTC+2

Olympique Star (Burundi)	0–0	(Sudan) Al-Hilal Al-Ubayyid
	Report

Stade Urukundo, Ngozi
Referee: Messie Nkounkou (Congo)
17 March 2018
19:00 UTC+2

Al-Hilal Al-Ubayyid (Sudan)	6–0	(Burundi) Olympique Star
El Tahir 3', 81'; Girfa 7', 33'; Ladzagla 19'; Abdelraheem 63'	Report

Al-Ubayyid Stadium, El-Obeid
Referee: Ayman El Sharif (Libya)

Al-Hilal Al-Ubayyid won 6–0 on aggregate.

6 March 2018
15:30 UTC+1

DC Motema Pembe (Democratic Republic of the Congo)	1–1	(Equatorial Guinea) Deportivo Niefang
Tshibamba 21'	Report	Sidibé 35'

Stade des Martyrs, Kinshasa
Referee: Joseph Odey Ogabor (Nigeria)
18 March 2018
16:00 UTC+1

Deportivo Niefang (Equatorial Guinea)	1–0	(Democratic Republic of the Congo) DC Motema Pembe
Mikue 15'	Report

Estadio de Bata, Bata
Referee: Abdoulaye Rhissa Almoustapha (Niger)

Deportivo Niefang won 2–1 on aggregate.

6 March 2018
15:30 UTC+1

CS La Mancha (Republic of the Congo)	3–0	(Sudan) Al-Ahly Shendi
Mbenza 22' (pen.); Agbodo 65'; Mantouari 81'	Report

Stade Municipal, Pointe-Noire
Referee: Jean Marc Ganamandji (Central African Republic)
16 March 2018
19:00 UTC+2

Al-Ahly Shendi (Sudan)	2–1	(Republic of the Congo) CS La Mancha
Elhussain 7'; Magbi 62' (pen.)	Report	Ngoma 47'

Shendi Stadium, Shendi
Referee: Maguette N'Diaye (Senegal)

CS La Mancha won 4–2 on aggregate.

7 March 2018
17:00 UTC+1

Al-Ittihad Tripoli (Libya)	1–0	(Nigeria) Akwa United
Eisa 83'	Report

Stade Taïeb Mhiri, Sfax (Tunisia)
Referee: Kokou Ognankotan Ntale (Togo)
18 March 2018
16:00 UTC+1

Akwa United (Nigeria)	1–0	(Libya) Al-Ittihad Tripoli
Asuquo 46'	Report
Penalties
Etim (penalty scored); Olisema (penalty scored); Kester (penalty scored); Nya (penalty missed)	3–2	(penalty scored) Shafshuf; (penalty scored) Al Badri

Godswill Akpabio International Stadium, Uyo
Referee: Joaquin Esono (Equatorial Guinea)

1–1 on aggregate. Akwa United won 3–2 on penalties.

7 March 2018
15:30 UTC+1

CARA Brazzaville (Republic of the Congo)	3–0	(Tunisia) US Ben Guerdane
Kivutuka 3'; Thoury 22'; Louamba 79'	Report

Stade Alphonse Massemba-Débat, Brazzaville
Referee: Issa Abdelhadi (Chad)
18 March 2018
14:00 UTC+1

US Ben Guerdane (Tunisia)	3–1	(Republic of the Congo) CARA Brazzaville
Loua Loua 13'; Yahia 57'; Zoghlami 83'	Report	Louamba 73'

Stade du 7 Mars, Ben Gardane
Referee: Adissa Abdul Raphiou Ligali (Benin)

CARA Brazzaville won 4–3 on aggregate.

6 March 2018
17:00 UTC+1

CR Belouizdad (Algeria)	3–0	(Zambia) Nkana
Benkablia 46'; Lamhene 59'; Draoui 71'	Report

Stade du 20-Août-1955, Algiers
Referee: Sadok Selmi (Tunisia)
17 March 2018
15:00 UTC+2

Nkana (Zambia)	1–0	(Algeria) CR Belouizdad
Apanene 47' (pen.)	Report

Nkana Stadium, Kitwe
Referee: Thulani Sibandze (Swaziland)

CR Belouizdad won 3–1 on aggregate.

7 March 2018
18:00 UTC+3

Simba (Tanzania)	2–2	(Egypt) Al-Masry
Bocco 10' (pen.); Okwi 74' (pen.)	Report	Gomaa 12'; Shoukry 26' (pen.)

National Stadium, Dar es Salaam
Referee: Thando Ndzandzeka (South Africa)
17 March 2018
19:30 UTC+2

Al-Masry (Egypt)	0–0	(Tanzania) Simba
	Report

Al-Masry Club Stadium, Port Said
Attendance: 13,000
Referee: Yonas Zekarias Ghebre (Eritrea)

2–2 on aggregate. Al-Masry won on away goals.

6 March 2018
17:00 UTC+0

RS Berkane (Morocco)	3–1	(Tunisia) Club Africain
Aziz 24'; Laba 31'; Akhmis 75'	Report	Khalifa 89' (pen.)

Stade Municipal de Berkane, Berkane
Referee: Ali Lemghaifry (Mauritania)
17 March 2018
15:00 UTC+1

Club Africain (Tunisia)	0–1	(Morocco) RS Berkane
	Report	El Kaabi 72'

Stade Olympique de Radès, Tunis
Referee: Louis Hakizimana (Rwanda)

RS Berkane won 4–1 on aggregate.

6 March 2018
19:00 UTC+0

Raja Casablanca (Morocco)	1–1	(Mauritania) FC Nouadhibou
Khaldane 69'	Report	Voullany 79'

Stade Mohammed V, Casablanca
Attendance: 21,000
Referee: Mahmoud El Banna (Egypt)
17 March 2018
15:30 UTC+0

FC Nouadhibou (Mauritania)	2–4	(Morocco) Raja Casablanca
Gaye 12'; Moustapha 63'	Report	Iajour 5', 44'; Hafidi 15'; Benhalib 69'

Stade Municipal, Nouadhibou
Attendance: 12,000
Referee: Sékou Ahmed Touré (Guinea)

Raja Casablanca won 5–3 on aggregate.

7 March 2018
16:00 UTC+3

Welayta Dicha (Ethiopia)	2–1	(Egypt) Zamalek
Melayu 16'; Dawit 77'	Report	Fathy 36'

Hawassa International Stadium, Awasa
Referee: Ishmael Chizinga (Malawi)
18 March 2018
18:00 UTC+2

Zamalek (Egypt)	2–1	(Ethiopia) Welayta Dicha
Madbouly 45+1' (pen.), 48'	Report	Usman 51'
Penalties
Madbouly (penalty scored); Morsy (penalty scored); Ibrahim (penalty scored); Hefny (penalty missed); Abdel Aziz (penalty missed)	3–4	(penalty scored) Djako; (penalty scored) Holeta; (penalty scored) Usman; (penalty scored) Kumma

Al-Salam Stadium, Cairo
Attendance: 10,000
Referee: Davies Omweno (Kenya)

3–3 on aggregate. Welayta Dicha won 4–3 on penalties.

== Play-off round ==
The play-off round included 32 teams: the 16 winners of the Confederation Cup first round and the 16 losers of the Champions League first round. The draw for the play-off round was held on 21 March 2018, 19:00 EET (UTC+2), at the Ritz Carlton in Cairo, Egypt. The winners of the Confederation Cup first round were drawn against the losers of the Champions League first round, with the teams from the Confederation Cup hosting the second leg.

The 32 teams were seeded by their performances in the CAF competitions for the previous five seasons (CAF 5-year ranking points shown in parentheses):

- Pot A contained the four highest-ranked losers of the Champions League first round.
- Pot B contained the four highest-ranked winners of the Confederation Cup first round.
- Pot C contained the twelve lowest-ranked losers of the Champions League first round.
- Pot D contained the twelve lowest-ranked winners of the Confederation Cup first round.

First, a team from Pot A and a team from Pot D were drawn into four ties. Next, a team from Pot B and a team from Pot C were drawn into four ties. Finally, the remaining teams from Pot C and Pot D were drawn into the last eight ties.

Pot	Pot A	Pot B	Pot C	Pot D
Qualified from	Champions League	Confederation Cup	Champions League	Confederation Cup
Teams	(Sudan) Al-Hilal (21 pts); (Democratic Republic of the Congo) AS Vita Club (15 pts); (Ethiopia) Saint George (10.5 pts); (Zambia) Zanaco (10 pts)	(Algeria) USM Alger (35 pts); (South Africa) SuperSport United (20 pts); (Sudan) Al-Hilal Al-Ubayyid (10 pts); (Nigeria) Enyimba (8 pts)	(Ivory Coast) ASEC Mimosas (5 pts); (Gabon) CF Mounana (2.5 pts); (Tanzania) Young Africans (2 pts); (Ivory Coast) Williamsville AC; (Ghana) Aduana Stars; (Kenya) Gor Mahia; (Mozambique) UD Songo; (Nigeria) MFM; (Nigeria) Plateau United; (Rwanda) Rayon Sports; (Senegal) Génération Foot; (South Africa) Bidvest Wits	(Algeria) CR Belouizdad; (Republic of the Congo) CARA Brazzaville; (Republic of the Congo) CS La Mancha; (Egypt) Al-Masry; (Equatorial Guinea) Deportivo Niefang; (Ethiopia) Welayta Dicha; (Madagascar) Fosa Juniors; (Mali) Djoliba; (Morocco) Raja Casablanca; (Morocco) RS Berkane; (Mozambique) Costa do Sol; (Nigeria) Akwa United

The 16 winners of the play-off round advanced to the group stage.

Team 1	Agg.	Team 2	1st leg	2nd leg
Zanaco (Zambia)	0–5	(Morocco) Raja Casablanca	0–2	0–3
AS Vita Club (Democratic Republic of the Congo)	6–1	(Republic of the Congo) CS La Mancha	1–0	5–1
Saint George (Ethiopia)	1–1 (3–4 p)	(Republic of the Congo) CARA Brazzaville	1–0	0–1
Al-Hilal (Sudan)	3–3 (a)	(Nigeria) Akwa United	2–0	1–3
Gor Mahia (Kenya)	2–2 (a)	(South Africa) SuperSport United	1–0	1–2
UD Songo (Mozambique)	4–3	(Sudan) Al-Hilal Al-Ubayyid	3–1	1–2
Plateau United (Nigeria)	2–5	(Algeria) USM Alger	2–1	0–4
Bidvest Wits (South Africa)	1–1 (a)	(Nigeria) Enyimba	1–1	0–0
Aduana Stars (Ghana)	7–3	(Madagascar) Fosa Juniors	6–1	1–2
Young Africans (Tanzania)	2–1	(Ethiopia) Welayta Dicha	2–0	0–1
Génération Foot (Senegal)	3–3 (a)	(Morocco) RS Berkane	3–1	0–2
CF Mounana (Gabon)	2–3	(Egypt) Al-Masry	1–1	1–2
ASEC Mimosas (Ivory Coast)	1–0	(Algeria) CR Belouizdad	1–0	0–0
Williamsville AC (Ivory Coast)	3–2	(Equatorial Guinea) Deportivo Niefang	2–0	1–2
MFM (Nigeria)	0–1	(Mali) Djoliba	0–1	0–0
Rayon Sports (Rwanda)	3–2	(Mozambique) Costa do Sol	3–0	0–2

7 April 2018
15:00 UTC+2

Zanaco (Zambia)	0–2	(Morocco) Raja Casablanca
	Report	Benhalib 67'; Hadraf 75'

National Heroes Stadium, Lusaka
Attendance: 8,000
Referee: Bamlak Tessema Weyesa (Ethiopia)
18 April 2018
20:00 UTC+1

Raja Casablanca (Morocco)	3–0	(Zambia) Zanaco
Benhalib 15'; Iajour 18'; Banoun 78'	Report

Stade Mohammed V, Casablanca
Attendance: 21,000
Referee: Mustapha Ghorbal (Algeria)

Raja Casablanca won 5–0 on aggregate.

7 April 2018
15:30 UTC+1

AS Vita Club (Democratic Republic of the Congo)	1–0	(Republic of the Congo) CS La Mancha
Ngoma 87'	Report

Stade des Martyrs, Kinshasa
Referee: Denis Dembélé (Ivory Coast)
17 April 2018
15:30 UTC+1

CS La Mancha (Republic of the Congo)	1–5	(Democratic Republic of the Congo) AS Vita Club
Mbenza 40' (pen.)	Report	Mundele 8', 59', 61', 88'; Moloko 79'

Stade Municipal, Pointe-Noire
Referee: Mutaz Khairalla (Sudan)

AS Vita Club won 6–1 on aggregate.

7 April 2018
16:00 UTC+3

Saint George (Ethiopia)	1–0	(Republic of the Congo) CARA Brazzaville
Girma 78'	Report

Addis Ababa Stadium, Addis Ababa
Referee: Ibrahim Nour El Din (Egypt)
18 April 2018
15:30 UTC+1

CARA Brazzaville (Republic of the Congo)	1–0	(Ethiopia) Saint George
Mbo 36'	Report
Penalties
Louamba (penalty scored); Diafouka (penalty scored); Chancy (penalty missed); Thoury (penalty scored); Ankira (penalty scored)	4–3	(penalty missed) Adane; (penalty missed) Assefa

Stade Alphonse Massemba-Débat, Brazzaville
Referee: Antoine Effa (Cameroon)

1–1 on aggregate. CARA Brazzaville won 4–3 on penalties.

8 April 2018
19:30 UTC+2

Al-Hilal (Sudan)	2–0	(Nigeria) Akwa United
Shelesh 20'; Al-Jerif 25'	Report

Al-Hilal Stadium, Omdurman
Referee: Jean-Jacques Ndala Ngambo (DR Congo)
18 April 2018
16:00 UTC+1

Akwa United (Nigeria)	3–1	(Sudan) Al-Hilal
Ibe 45', 52', 65' (pen.)	Report	Bashir 29'

Godswill Akpabio International Stadium, Uyo
Referee: Bernard Camille (Seychelles)

3–3 on aggregate. Al-Hilal won on away goals.

8 April 2018
15:00 UTC+3

Gor Mahia (Kenya)	1–0	(South Africa) SuperSport United
Tuyisenge 78' (pen.)	Report

Kenyatta Stadium, Machakos
Referee: Hamada Nampiandraza (Madagascar)
18 April 2018
19:00 UTC+2

SuperSport United (South Africa)	2–1	(Kenya) Gor Mahia
Shakava 60' (o.g.); Mnyamane 68'	Report	Kahata 61'

Lucas Masterpieces Moripe Stadium, Pretoria
Referee: Eric Otogo-Castane (Gabon)

2–2 on aggregate. Gor Mahia won on away goals.

7 April 2018
15:00 UTC+2

UD Songo (Mozambique)	3–1	(Sudan) Al-Hilal Al-Ubayyid
Amorim 21'; Kambala 34'; Pelembe 61'	Report	Tetteh 89'

Estádio do Ferroviário, Beira
Referee: Davies Omweno (Kenya)
18 April 2018
19:00 UTC+2

Al-Hilal Al-Ubayyid (Sudan)	2–1	(Mozambique) UD Songo
Amin 32'; Ladzagla 61'	Report	Kambala 21'

Al-Ubayyid Stadium, El-Obeid
Referee: Youssef Essrayri (Tunisia)

UD Songo won 4–3 on aggregate.

7 April 2018
16:00 UTC+1

Plateau United (Nigeria)	2–1	(Algeria) USM Alger
Osanga 21'; James 74'	Report	Yaya 55'

Agege Stadium, Lagos
Referee: Victor Gomes (South Africa)
17 April 2018
18:00 UTC+1

USM Alger (Algeria)	4–0	(Nigeria) Plateau United
Darfalou 29', 49'; Beldjilali 43'; Benkhemassa 79'	Report

Stade du 5-Juillet-1962, Algiers
Referee: Maguette N'Diaye (Senegal)

USM Alger won 5–2 on aggregate.

6 April 2018
20:00 UTC+2

Bidvest Wits (South Africa)	1–1	(Nigeria) Enyimba
Klate 3'	Report	Mustapha 5'

Bidvest Stadium, Johannesburg
Referee: Joshua Bondo (Botswana)
18 April 2018
16:00 UTC+1

Enyimba (Nigeria)	0–0	(South Africa) Bidvest Wits
	Report

U. J. Esuene Stadium, Calabar
Referee: Hélder Martins de Carvalho (Angola)

1–1 on aggregate. Enyimba won on away goals.

8 April 2018
15:00 UTC+0

Aduana Stars (Ghana)	6–1	(Madagascar) Fosa Juniors
Opoku 8', 84'; Adams 33' (pen.), 40' (pen.); Mumuni 62' (pen.); Adjei 86'	Report	Randrianantenaina 4'

Agyeman Badu Stadium, Dormaa Ahenkro
Referee: Bakary Gassama (Gambia)
18 April 2018
14:30 UTC+3

Fosa Juniors (Madagascar)	2–1	(Ghana) Aduana Stars
Marobe 4' (pen.); Andrinirina 41'	Report	Asamoah 61'

Rabemananjara Stadium, Mahajanga
Referee: Ali Adelaïd (Comoros)

Aduana Stars won 7–3 on aggregate.

7 April 2018
16:00 UTC+3

Young Africans (Tanzania)	2–0	(Ethiopia) Welayta Dicha
Daudi 1'; Martin 54'	Report

National Stadium, Dar es Salaam
Referee: Ferdinand Udoh (Nigeria)
18 April 2018
16:00 UTC+3

Welayta Dicha (Ethiopia)	1–0	(Tanzania) Young Africans
Djako 2'	Report

Hawassa International Stadium, Awasa
Referee: Ali Sabilla (Uganda)

Young Africans won 2–1 on aggregate.

7 April 2018
17:00 UTC+0

Génération Foot (Senegal)	3–1	(Morocco) RS Berkane
Ndiaye 49', 58', 63'	Report	El Kaabi 37'

Stade Léopold Sédar Senghor, Dakar
Referee: Daniel Laryea (Ghana)
18 April 2018
19:00 UTC+1

RS Berkane (Morocco)	2–0	(Senegal) Génération Foot
Aziz 33'; Diouf 75' (o.g.)	Report

Stade Municipal de Berkane, Berkane
Referee: Mahamadou Keita (Mali)

3–3 on aggregate. RS Berkane won on away goals.

6 April 2018
15:00 UTC+1

CF Mounana (Gabon)	1–1	(Egypt) Al-Masry
Atchabao 56'	Report	Gomaa 15'

Stade Augustin Monédan de Sibang, Libreville
Referee: Kokou Ognankotan Ntale (Togo)
17 April 2018
19:30 UTC+2

Al-Masry (Egypt)	2–1	(Gabon) CF Mounana
Koffi 59'; Issa 74'	Report	Ameka 65'

Al-Masry Club Stadium, Port Said
Attendance: 13,000
Referee: Noureddine El Jaafari (Morocco)

Al-Masry won 3–2 on aggregate.

8 April 2018
15:00 UTC+0

ASEC Mimosas (Ivory Coast)	1–0	(Algeria) CR Belouizdad
Agbégniadan 50'	Report

Stade Félix Houphouët-Boigny, Abidjan
Referee: Janny Sikazwe (Zambia)
17 April 2018
17:00 UTC+1

CR Belouizdad (Algeria)	0–0	(Ivory Coast) ASEC Mimosas
	Report

Stade du 20-Août-1955, Algiers
Referee: Sékou Ahmed Touré (Guinea)

ASEC Mimosas won 1–0 on aggregate.

7 April 2018
16:00 UTC+0

Williamsville AC (Ivory Coast)	2–0	(Equatorial Guinea) Deportivo Niefang
J.-F. N'da 13'; Zan Bi 54'	Report

Stade Robert Champroux, Abidjan
Referee: Ahmad Imtehaz Heeralall (Mauritius)
18 April 2018
16:00 UTC+1

Deportivo Niefang (Equatorial Guinea)	2–1	(Ivory Coast) Williamsville AC
Koné 3' (o.g.); Pogadjo 70'	Report	Karidioula 90+1'

Estadio de Bata, Bata
Referee: Norman Matemera (Zimbabwe)

Williamsville AC won 3–2 on aggregate.

8 April 2018
16:00 UTC+1

MFM (Nigeria)	0–1	(Mali) Djoliba
	Report	Niapégué 78'

Agege Stadium, Lagos
Referee: Amin Mohamed Omar (Egypt)
18 April 2018
17:00 UTC+0

Djoliba (Mali)	0–0	(Nigeria) MFM
	Report

Stade Modibo Kéïta, Bamako
Referee: Jean Claude Ishimwe (Rwanda)

Djoliba won 1–0 on aggregate.

6 April 2018
18:00 UTC+2

Rayon Sports (Rwanda)	3–0	(Mozambique) Costa do Sol
Shabani 45+1' (pen.), 84'; Muhire 78'	Report

Stade Régional Nyamirambo, Kigali
Referee: Jackson Pavaza (Namibia)
18 April 2018
19:00 UTC+2

Costa do Sol (Mozambique)	2–0	(Rwanda) Rayon Sports
Isac 30', 45+1'	Report

Estádio do Zimpeto, Maputo
Referee: Thierry Nkurunziza (Burundi)

Rayon Sports won 3–2 on aggregate.
