= Sow =

Sow or SOW may refer to:

- Sowing, the process of planting

== Female animals ==
- Badger
- Bear
- Guinea pig
- Hedgehog
- Suidae
  - Wild boar
  - Pig

== Arts, entertainment and media ==
- "Sow", a poem by Sylvia Plath
- Sow (playing card), common name for the Deuce in cards games in southern Germany
- S.O.W. Sense of Wonder, 2010 single by Idoling!!!

== Places ==
- Show Low Regional Airport (IATA airport code), Arizona, US
- Sowerby Bridge railway station (Network Rail station code), England
- River Sow, England

== People ==
- Abdoul Salam Sow (born 1970), Guinean footballer
- Abdoulaye Sékou Sow (1931–2013), former Prime Minister of Mali
- Abdourahmane Sow (born 1942), Minister of the Interior of Senegal, chair of the World Scout Committee
- Aminata Sow Fall (born 1941), Senegalese author
- Baba Sow (born 1995), Senegalese footballer
- Coumba Sow (born 1994), Swiss footballer
- Daouda Sow (politician) (1933–2009), Senegalese politician
- Daouda Sow (boxer) (born 1983), boxer
- Djibril Sow (born 1997), Swiss footballer
- Fatou Ndiaye Sow (1937–2004), Senegalese poet
- Kareem Sow (born 2000), Canadian soccer player
- Karim Sow (born 2003), Swiss footballer
- Moussa Sow (born 1986), French-Senegalese footballer
- Osman Sow (born 1990), Swedish footballer of Senegalese descent
- Pape Sow (born 1981), Senegalese basketball player
- Samba Sow, multiple people
- Sidy Sow (born 1998), Canadian American football player
- Thierno Faty Sow (1941–2009), Senegalese filmmaker and actor

== Other uses ==
- Sow, the channel connecting pig iron ingots during casting
- sow, a covered shed used in medieval siege warfare
- Scheme of work, defines the structure and content of an academic course
- Share of wallet, a survey method used in performance management
- Statement of work, in project management
- Special Operations Wing, a designation of the US Air Force

== See also ==
- Sew
