= 2015–16 Raja CA season =

Raja CA
2015–16 season
- President: Mohamed Boudrika
- Manager: Ruud Krol (until 5 November); Rachid Taoussi
- Stadium: Stade Mohammed V (until 26 March 2016)
- Botola: Runners-up
- UNAF Club Cup: Winners
- Top goalscorer: League: Abdelilah Hafidi (11 goals); All: Abdelilah Hafidi (12 goals)
- Biggest win: 5–1 v Hassania Agadir (Home, 29 May 2016, Botola)
Home colours

The 2015–16 season is Raja CA's 66rd season in existence and the club's 58th consecutive season in the top flight of Moroccan football. They are competing in Botola, the Throne Cup and the UNAF Club Cup. It was the first season since 2004–05 without Rachid Soulaimani and since 2006–07 without Yassine Salhi.

The team's home matches were played at Stade Mohammed V until its closing for renovation on 26 March 2016.

Raja CA kicked off the season with 0–1 loss against JS El Massira in the first round of the Throne Cup.

== Squad list ==
Players and squad numbers last updated on 31 January 2016.

Note: Flags indicate national team as has been defined under FIFA eligibility rules. Players may hold more than one non-FIFA nationality.

No.	Name	Nat.	Position	Date of Birth (Age)	Signed from
Goalkeepers
1	Anas Zniti	(Morocco)	GK	28 October 1988 (aged 27)	(Morocco) AS FAR
22	Mohamed Boujad	(Morocco)	GK	25 February 1988 (aged 28)	(Morocco) Chabab Rif Hoceima
32	Hicham El Allouch	(Morocco)	GK	20 October 1985 (aged 30)	(Morocco) Olympique Khourbiga
Defenders
2	Hamza Toumi	(Morocco)	LB	6 January 1995 (aged 21)	(Morocco) Youth system
3	Zakaria El Hachimi	(Morocco)	RB	4 August 1987 (aged 28)	(Morocco) Union Mohammedia
13	Badr Benoun	(Morocco)	CB	30 September 1993 (aged 22)	(Morocco) Youth system
16	Mohamed Oulhaj	(Morocco)	CB	6 January 1988 (aged 28)	(Morocco) Youth system
20	Abdeljalil Jbira	(Morocco)	LB	14 March 1990 (aged 26)	(Morocco) Kawkab Marrakech
21	Adil Kerrouchy	(Morocco)	LB	23 November 1982 (aged 33)	(Morocco) Difaâ El Jadidi
25	Omar Boutayeb	(Morocco)	RB	19 April 1994 (aged 22)	(Morocco) Youth system
49	Mohamed Awal	(Ghana)	CB	1 May 1988 (aged 28)	(Saudi Arabia) Al Shabab
Midfielders
5	Soufiane Gadoume	(Morocco)	CDM	28 July 1988 (aged 27)	(Morocco) Difaâ El Jadidi
6	Mohammed Ali Bemammer	(Morocco)	CDM	19 November 1989 (aged 26)	(Morocco) Maghreb Fès
7	Walid Sabbar	(Morocco)	CM	25 February 1996 (aged 20)	(Morocco) Youth system
14	Lema Mabidi	(Democratic Republic of the Congo)	CM	11 June 1993 (aged 23)	(Tunisia) CS Sfaxien
17	Mohamed Messoudi	(Belgium)	AM	7 January 1984 (aged 32)	(Belgium) Zulte Waregem
26	Anas Soudani	(Morocco)	CM	1 July 1995 (aged 20)	(Morocco) Youth system
30	Mouhcine Mouhtadi	(Morocco)	CDM	17 January 1996 (aged 20)	(Morocco) Youth system
55	Ahmed Jahouh	(Morocco)	CM	31 July 1988 (aged 27)	(Morocco) Moghreb Tetouan
99	Issam Erraki	(Morocco)	CM	5 January 1981 (aged 35)	(United Arab Emirates) Emirates Club
Forwards
7	Youssef Kaddioui	(Morocco)	LW/AM	28 September 1984 (aged 31)	(United Arab Emirates) Al Dhafra
8	Moussa Bakayoko	(Ivory Coast)	FW	27 December 1996 (aged 19)	(Ivory Coast) USC Bassam
9	Mohamed Bouldini	(Morocco)	ST	27 November 1995 (aged 20)	(Morocco) Rachad Bernoussi
10	Michel Babatunde	(Nigeria)	FW/AM	24 December 1992 (aged 23)	(Ukraine) Dnipro Dnipropetrovsk
11	Zouheir El Ouassli	(Morocco)	LW	11 August 1993 (aged 22)	(Morocco) Tihad AS
18	Abdelilah Hafidi	(Morocco)	LW/AM	30 January 1992 (aged 24)	(Morocco) Youth system
24	Mahmoud Benhalib	(Morocco)	LW	23 March 1996 (aged 20)	(Morocco) Youth system
25	Yassine Salhi	(Morocco)	FW/AM	3 November 1987 (aged 28)	(Morocco) Youth system
29	Mohamed Yakubu	(Ghana)	ST	26 July 1990 (aged 25)	(Ghana) Ashanti Gold
33	Christian Osaguona	(Nigeria)	ST	10 October 1990 (aged 25)	(Nigeria) Enugu Rangers
93	Abdelkbir El Ouadi	(Morocco)	LW	20 February 1993 (aged 23)	(Morocco) Wydad Fes
77	Nathaniel Asamoah	(Ghana)	ST	22 February 1994 (aged 22)	(Ghana) Medeama SC

== Transfers ==
=== In ===
Date	Pos	Player	Moving from	Transfer fee	Source
9 May 2015	FW	(Morocco) Youssef Kaddioui	(United Arab Emirates) Al Dhafra	Free agent	
15 May 2015	MF	(Tunisia) Khaled Korbi	(Tunisia) Club Africain	Free agent	
9 June 2015	GK	(Morocco) Anas Zniti	AS FAR	Free agent	
17 June 2015	AM	(Belgium) Mohamed Messoudi	(Belgium) Zulte Waregem	Free agent	
17 June 2015	FW	(Morocco) Mohamed Bouldini	Rachad Bernoussi	€65 k	
25 July 2015	DF	(Ghana) Mohamed Awal	(Saudi Arabia) Al Shabab	Free agent	
12 August 2015	MF	(Morocco) Soufiane Gadoum	Difaâ El Jadidi	€110 k	
21 August 2015	FW	(Ghana) Mohammed Yakubu	(Ghana) Ashanti Gold	€175 k	
27 August 2015	FW	(Ghana) Nathaniel Asamoah	(Ghana) Medeama SC	€328 k	
4 September 2015	MF	(Morocco) Lema Mabidi	(Tunisia) CS Sfaxien	Free agent	
7 September 2015	MF	(Morocco) Ahmed Jahouh	Moghreb Tetouan	€400 k	
2 January 2016	FW	(Nigeria) Michel Babatunde	(Ukraine) Dnipro Dnipropetrovsk	Free agent	
16 January 2016	FW	(Morocco) Zouheir El Ouassli	Tihad AS	Undisclosed	

=== Out ===
Date	Pos	Player	Moving to	Transfer fee	Source
25 May 2015	FW	(Morocco) Salaheddine Aqqal	Kawkab Marrakech	Released	
22 June 2015	GK	(Morocco) Khalid Askri	CR Hoceima	Released	
26 June 2015	FW	(Morocco) Jawad Issine	CR Hoceima	Released	
29 June 2015	DF	(Morocco) Ahmed Chagou	Kawkab Marrakech	Released	
1 July 2015	DF	(Mali) Idrissa Coulibaly	(Portugal) Arouca	Free	
1 July 2015	DF	(Morocco) Ismail Belmaalem	Qatar SC	€550 k	
6 July 2015	MF	(Morocco) Said Fettah	AS FAR	€70 k	
21 July 2015	DF	(Morocco) Rachid Soulaimani	-	Released	
21 July 2015	MF	(Ivory Coast) Koukou Guehi	Olympique Safi	End of contract	
22 July 2015	MF	(Central African Republic) Vianney Mabidé	Moghreb Tétouan	€60 k	
25 July 2015	FW	(Morocco) Youssef El Gnaoui	Fath US	€300 k	
25 July 2015	FW	(Republic of the Congo) Silvère Ganvoula	(Turkey) Elazigspor	Undisclosed	
21 August 2015	FW	(Morocco) Hamza Abourazzouk	Moghreb Tétouan	Free	
27 August 2015	MF	(Tunisia) Khaled Korbi	(Tunisia) Stade Tunisien	Released	
15 September 2015	DF	(Morocco) Mustapha Belmkadem	MC Oujda	Loan	
17 December 2015	MF	(Morocco) Mohammed Ali Bemammer	Difaâ El Jadidi	€80 k	
1 January 2016	DF	(Morocco) Ayoub Boucheta	JS Kasbah Tadla	Undisclosed	
1 January 2016	DF	(Morocco) Hamza Moussadak	Difaâ El Jadidi	Undisclosed	
1 January 2016	FW	(Ghana) Nathaniel Asamoah	-	Free	
13 January 2016	MF	(Morocco) Walid Sabbar	Kawkab Marrakech	Loan	
13 January 2016	FW	(Ghana) Mohammed Yakubu	Union Aït Melloul	Loan	
30 January 2016	FW	(Morocco) Yassine Salhi	Kuwait SC	Loan (€70 k)	

== Pre-season and friendlies ==
2 August 2015 Friendly	Antalyaspor (Turkey)	1–1	(Morocco) Raja CA	Afyon, Turkey
18:00	Başsan 80'	Report	Kaddioui 45'; Korbi (red card) 54'	Stadium: Afyon Kocatepe Stadium

5 August 2016 Friendly	Al Faisaly (Saudi Arabia)	0–0	(Morocco) Raja CA	Afyon, Turkey
18:00		Report		Stadium: Afyon Kocatepe Stadium

8 August 2015 Friendly	Torku Konyaspor (Turkey)	0–0	(Morocco) Raja CA	Konya, Turkey
18:00	Bardakcı 83'	Report	Jbira (red card) 85'	Stadium: Torku Arena

29 January 2016 Friendly	Raja CA (Morocco)	1–0	(Morocco) Misr Lel Makkasa	El Jadida, Morocco
19:00	El Ouadi 30'	Report		Stadium: Ben M'Hamed El Abdi Stadium

== Competitions ==
=== Overview ===
Competition	First match	Last match	Starting round	Final position	Record							
Competition	First match	Last match	Starting round	Final position	Pld	W	D	L	GF	GA	GD	Win %
Botola	6 September 2015	4 June 2016	Matchday 1	5th	30	13	8	9	48	30	+18	43.33
Throne Cup	24 August 2015	4 November 2015	Round of 32	Semi-finals	8	3	3	2	9	8	+1	37.50
UNAF Club Cup	14 August 2015	19 August 2015	Group stage	Winners	3	2	1	0	3	0	+3	66.67
Total					41	18	12	11	60	38	+22	43.90

Last updated: 4 June 2016
Source: Sofascore

=== Botola ===
==== League table ====
Pos	Team	Pld	W	D	L	GF	GA	GD	Pts	Qualification or relegation
1	FUS Rabat (C)	30	16	10	4	40	21	+19	58	CAF Champions League and the Arab Club Championship
2	Wydad Casablanca	30	16	8	6	34	19	+15	56	Qualification to the CAF Champions League
3	IR Tanger	30	14	8	8	36	23	+13	50	Qualification to the CAF Confederation Cup
4	FAR Rabat	30	13	8	9	40	35	+5	47	
5	Raja CA	30	13	8	9	48	30	+18	47	
6	Moghreb Tétouan	30	12	7	11	34	43	−9	43	
7	RSB Berkane	30	10	13	7	24	19	+5	43	
8	Hassania Agadir	30	11	8	11	44	46	−2	41	
9	Olympic Safi	30	9	10	11	23	27	−4	37	
10	Chabab Rif Hoceima	30	10	6	14	27	34	−7	36	
11	KAC Kénitra	30	10	5	15	26	37	−11	35	
12	Olympique Khouribga	30	9	7	14	26	35	−9	34	
13	Difaâ El Jadidi	30	7	13	10	26	30	−4	34	
14	Kawkab Marrakech	30	7	9	14	23	30	−7	30	
15	MC Oujda (R)	30	7	8	15	26	41	−15	29	Relegation to Botola 2
16	Maghreb Fès (R)	30	5	14	11	24	31	−7	29	Confederation Cup and relegation to Botola 2 (Note: Despite relegation, MAS Fès qualified for the 2017 CAF Confederation Cup as Coupe du Trône winners)

Updated to match(es) played on 4 June 2016. Source:
Rules for classification: 1) points; 2) goal difference; 3) number of goals scored.
(C) Champions; (R) Relegated

==== Results summary ====
Overall								Home						Away					
Pld	W	D	L	GF	GA	GD	Pts	W	D	L	GF	GA	GD	W	D	L	GF	GA	GD
30	13	8	9	48	30	+18	47	6	4	5	26	17	+9	7	4	4	22	13	+9

Last updated: 2 June 2016.
Source: Competitive matches

==== Results by round ====
Round	1	2	3	4	5	6	7	8	9	10	11	12	13	14	15	16	17	18	19	20	21	22	23	24	25	26	27	28	29	30
Ground	A	H	A	H	H	A	H	A	H	A	H	A	H	A	H	H	A	H	A	H	A	A	H	A	H	A	H	A	H	A
Result	L	D	W	L	W	W	L	L	L	D	W	D	D	D	D	D	W	W	W	W	W	W	L	W	L	D	W	L	W	L
Position	4	14	14	10	12	9	5	6	9	11	11	8	8	9	9	10	10	9	6	3	4	3	3	3	3	3	4	3	3	5

Updated to match(es) played on 2 June 2016. Source: Competitive matches
A = Away; H = Home; W = Win; D = Draw; L = Loss

==== Matches ====
Date	Opponents	Venue	Result	Scorers	Report
6 September 2015	Fath Union Sport	A	0–2		Report
12 September 2015	Kawkab Marrakech	H	1–1	El Ouadi 9'	Report
4 October 2015	MC Oujda	A	1–0	El Ouadi 89'	Report
10 October 2015	Kénitra AC	H	0–1		Report
31 October 2015	Maghreb Fès	H	3–0	Kerrouchy 79' (pen.) 87' Benhalib 83'	Report
8 November 2015	Chabab Rif Hoceima	A	2–0	El Ouadi 46' Salhi 76'	Report
17 November 2015	Moghreb Tétouan	H	2–3	Jahouh 2' Salhi 86'	Report
22 November 2015	AS FAR	A	0–1		Report
29 November 2015	Olympique Khouribga	H	1–2	Salhi 58' (pen.)	Report
6 December 2015	Difaâ El Jadidi	A	1–1	Bouldini 8'	Report
12 December 2015	RS Berkane	H	1–0	Benhalib 84'	Report
20 December 2015	Wydad AC	A	0–0		Report
26 December 2015	Olympique Safi	H	0–0		Report
1 January 2016	Hassania Agadir	A	1–1	Osaguona 17'	Report
7 January 2016	Ittihad Tanger	H	2–2	Jahouh 46' (pen.) Mabidi 77'	Report
12 February 2016	Fath Union Sport	H	1–1	Babatunde 67'	Report
21 February 2016	Kawkab Marrakech	A	2–0	Kaddioui 46' Mabidi 67'	Report
28 February 2016	MC Oujda	H	4–0	Hafidi 34' Kaddioui 40' (pen.) Babatunde 54' Awal 75'	Report
5 March 2016	Kénitra AC	A	3–0	El Ouasli 10' Jbira 58' Hafidi 71'	Report
19 March 2016	Chabab Rif Hoceima	H	2–1	Oulhaj 48' Babatunde 74'	Report
27 March 2016	Maghreb Fès	A	3–0	Erraki 55' Hafidi 63' 90+3'	Report
3 April 2016	Moghreb Tétouan	A	5–2	Benhalib 7' Erraki 32' (pen.) Hafidi 54', 82' Osaguona 80'	Report
11 April 2016	AS FAR	H	1–4	Erraki 52' (pen.)	Report
17 April 2016	Olympique Khouribga	A	3–1	Osaguona 4' El Ouasli 22' Hafidi 61'	Report
23 April 2016	Difaâ El Jadidi	H	0–1		Report
30 April 2016	RS Berkane	A	1–1	Mabidi 6'	Report
8 May 2016	Wydad AC	H	3–0	Osaguona 19' Hafidi 41' Erraki 90+2'	Report
22 May 2016	Olympique Safi	A	0–1		Report
29 May 2016	Hassania Agadir	H	5–1	Osaguona 21' 31' Hafidi 80' (pen.), 90', 90+4'	Report
4 June 2016	Ittihad Tanger	A	0–3		Report

=== Throne Cup ===
==== Round of 32 ====
24 August 2015 Round of 32 First leg	Raja CA	0–1	JS Massira	Casablanca
18:00			Oulhaj 11' (o.g.)	Stadium: Stade Mohammed V

28 August 2015 Round of 32 Second leg	JS Massira	1–2 (2-2 agg.)	Raja CA	Laayoune
16:00	Thali 35'		Kaddioui 87', 90+3'	Stadium: Sheikh Mohamed Laghdaf Stadium

==== Round of 16 ====
2 September 2015 Round of 16 First leg	Raja CA	1–0	Kawkab Marrakech	Casablanca
16:00	Yakubu 53'			Stadium: Stade Mohammed V

9 September 2015 Round of 16 Second leg	Kawkab Marrakech	1–1 (1-2 agg.)	Raja CA	Marrakesh
18:00	Bahja 83' (pen.)		Messoudi 53'	Stadium: Marrakesh Stadium

==== Quarter-finals ====
19 September 2015 Quarter-finals First leg	Raja CA	1–1	Maghreb de Fes	Casablanca
17:00	Jahouh 27' (pen.)		Sidibé 63'	Stadium: Stade Mohammed V

22 September 2015 Quarter-finals Second leg	Maghreb de Fes	1–1 (2-2 agg.) (2–4 p)	Raja CA	Fez
17:00	Bencharki 84' (pen.)		El Ouadi 12'	Stadium: Fez Stadium
	Penalties
	Bencharki (penalty scored); Sylla (penalty missed); Dahmani (penalty missed); Sektioui (penalty missed)		(penalty scored) Jahouh; (penalty scored) Benoun; (penalty scored) Bemammer; (penalty scored) Kaddioui

==== Semi-finals ====
14 October 2015 Semi-finals First leg	Raja CA	3–1	Fath Union Sport	Casablanca
18:00	Jahouh 16' (pen.); El Ouadi 45'; Hafidi 59'		Benjelloun 49'	Stadium: Stade Mohammed V

4 November 2015 Semi-finals Second leg	Fath Union Sport	2–0 (3-3 agg.)	Raja CA	Rabat
18:00	Khalis 82'; Nahiri 88'			Stadium: Stade Moulay Hassan

=== UNAF Club Cup ===
14 August 2015	Raja CA (Morocco)	1–0	(Egypt) Ismaily SC	Casablanca
21:00	Bouldini 39'			Stadium: Stade Mohammed V Attendance: 35,000; Referee: Amir Loussif (Tunisia)

16 August 2015	Raja CA (Morocco)	2–0	(Tunisia) Club Africain	Casablanca
21:00	Bouldini 32'; Iajour 88'			Stadium: Stade Mohammed V Referee: Ibrahim Noureddin (Egypt)

19 August 2015	Raja CA (Morocco)	0–0	(Libya) Al-Hilal Benghazi	Casablanca
21:00				Stadium: Stade Mohammed V Referee: Sadok Selmi (Tunisia)

== Squad information ==
=== Goals ===
Includes all competitive matches. The list is sorted alphabetically by surname when total goals are equal.

Rank	Pos.	Player	Botola	Throne Cup	UNAF Club Cup	Total
1	FW	(Morocco) Abdelilah Hafidi	11	1	0	12
2	FW	(Nigeria) Christian Osaguona	6	0	0	6
3	FW	(Morocco) Abdelkabir El Ouadi	3	2	0	5
4	MF	(Morocco) Issam Erraki	4	0	0	4
5	MF	(Morocco) Ahmed Jahouh	2	2	0	4
6	FW	(Morocco) Youssef Kaddioui	2	2	0	4
7	FW	(Nigeria) Michel Babatunde	3	0	0	3
8	FW	(Morocco) Yassine Salhi	3	0	0	3
9	FW	(Morocco) Mohamed Bouldini	1	0	2	3
10	FW	(Morocco) Mahmoud Benhalib	3	0	0	3
11	MF	(Democratic Republic of the Congo) Lema Mabidi	3	0	0	3
12	DF	(Morocco) Adil Karrouchy	2	0	0	2
13	FW	(Morocco) Zouheir El Ouasli	2	0	0	2
14	DF	(Morocco) Abdeljalil Jbira	1	0	0	1
15	DF	(Ghana) Mohamed Awal	1	0	0	1
16	DF	(Morocco) Mohamed Oulhaj	1	0	0	1
17	AM	(Morocco) Mohamed Messoudi	0	1	0	1
18	FW	(Morocco) Hamza Iajour	0	0	1	1
19	FW	(Ghana) Mohamed Yakubu	0	1	0	1
Own goals			0	0	0	0
Total			48	9	3	60

=== Assists ===
Rank	Pos.	Player	Botola	Throne Cup	UNAF Club Cup	Total
1	AM	(Morocco) Abdelilah Hafidi	4	2	0	6
2	AM	(Nigeria) Michel Babatunde	4	0	0	4
3	DF	(Morocco) Zouheir El Ouasli	3	0	0	3
4	FW	(Morocco) Zakaria El Hachimi	3	0	0	3
5	MF	(Morocco) Issam Erraki	2	0	0	2
6	DF	(Morocco) Abdelkabir El Ouadi	0	1	1	2
7	MF	(Morocco) Youssef Kaddioui	1	0	1	2
8	FW	(Morocco) Abdeljalil Jbira	2	0	0	2
9	FW	(Morocco) Mohamed Bouldini	2	0	0	2
10	FW	(Morocco) Anas Zniti	1	0	0	1
11	DF	(Democratic Republic of the Congo) Lema Mabidi	1	0	0	1
12	MF	(Morocco) Mohamed Oulhaj	0	1	0	1
13	FW	(Morocco) Anas Soudani	1	0	0	1
14	DF	(Nigeria) Christian Osaguona	1	0	0	1
15	DF	(Morocco) Mahmoud Benhalib	1	0	0	1
