= Bury Grammar School (Girls) =

Coordinates: 53°35′27.4″N 2°18′13.8″W

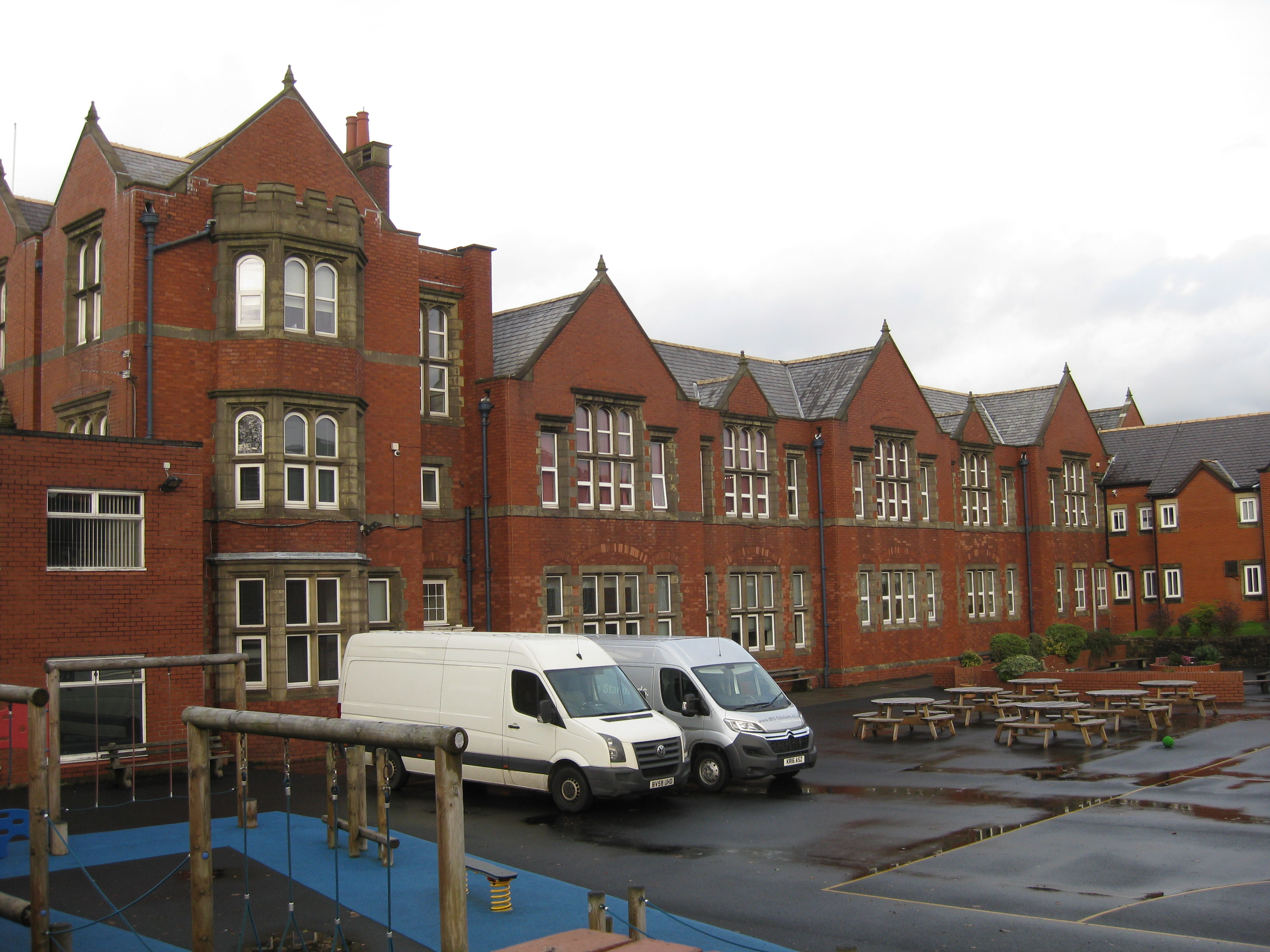

Location
- Bridge Road; Bury, Greater Manchester, BL9 0HH; England

Information
- Type: Private grammar school
- Motto: Latin: Sanctas Clavis Fores Aperit (The key that opens sacred doors)
- Religious affiliation: Church of England
- Established: 1884
- Founder: Revd Roger Kay
- Department for Education URN: 105374 Tables
- Chair of Governors: Richard Smyth
- Principal: Jo Anderson
- Staff: 76 teaching; 37 support
- Gender: 3-11 Mixed; 11-16 Girls; 16-18 Mixed
- Age: 3 to 18
- Enrolment: 714
- Capacity: 1100
- Houses: Lester, Kitchener, Nield, Perigo
- Colours: Oxford blue Cambridge blue
- Old Girls: Old Claviennes
- Website: http://www.bgsg.bury.sch.uk/home.htm

Bury Grammar School (Girls) is a private girls' day school in Bury, Greater Manchester, England, which was founded in 1884. The Headmistress since 2015 has been Jo Anderson. The previous headmistress, Bobby Georghiou, retired after 12 years in post. The Headmistress is a member of the GSA. The 2016 school fees were £13,089 p.a. for senior pupils and £9,948 p.a. in the junior school.

== History ==
Although no girls were admitted to Bury Grammar School when it was founded, on its re-founding by Rev’d Prebendary Roger Kay in 1726 he bequeathed money specifically for girls’ education, his bequest stating: "I charge my Estate called Warth in Rattcliff with the payment of five pounds yearly" in order that ten poor girls born, or to be born, in the parish and town of Bury might receive an education "to make them perfect in their Reading the Bible, to teach 'em to write well, and to be good Accountants to fit 'em for Trades or to be good Servants".

The education provided under the terms of Kay's will remains unrecorded until, on 22 January 1884, Bury High School for Girls opened as a fee-paying school. Mr. Henry Webb, Bury's representative on the Hulme Trust, had moved a resolution that "it is desirable that a High School for Girls be formed." Initially, it was run by a private company of gentlemen with an interest in education. They appointed Miss Jane Penelope Kitchener, a cousin of General Lord Kitchener, as the first headmistress. The school was based in a townhouse in Bolton Street (since demolished), on a site opposite the Castle Leisure Centre. There were 23 girls in attendance and lessons (Latin, French, science, mathematics, English, music, needlework and games) were taught from 9.00am to 1.00pm, with a half hour break each day.

In 1900, the school was taken over by the governors of the Grammar School and was renamed Bury Grammar School for Girls. Almost immediately, plans evolved for a new building, to be shared by the boys’ and girls’ schools. The new building was funded in part by the governors and in part by grants from the Hulme Trust; there were also donations of land and money from the Earl of Derby. The new buildings, of Accrington brick, were designed in a simple Neo-Renaissance style by William Venn Gough. In 1903 the boys' school moved from its existing premises in The Wylde to half of the current girls' school site; the following year, the cornerstone of the girls' school was laid. The girls moved in on completion of this part of the building in 1906.

For Miss Kitchener, Headmistress since the High School for Girls had opened in 1884, there must have been a great sense of relief. Gone would be the cramped conditions of the old town house where the girls had to traipse all the way upstairs in order to change their outdoor boots for indoor shoes and whose only claim to fame was a gravel tennis court and instead there would be spacious classrooms, an art room, a laboratory and, in the none too distant future there would be a glorious central hall.

A school was being built; half of it was already complete and filled with boys; the rest was waiting for us - the Girls' School. We arrived on 17 January 1906, smiled pleasantly at our neighbours, firmly shut all of the interconnecting doors and got on with the job of providing our girls with a no nonsense high quality education, good manners and good sense.

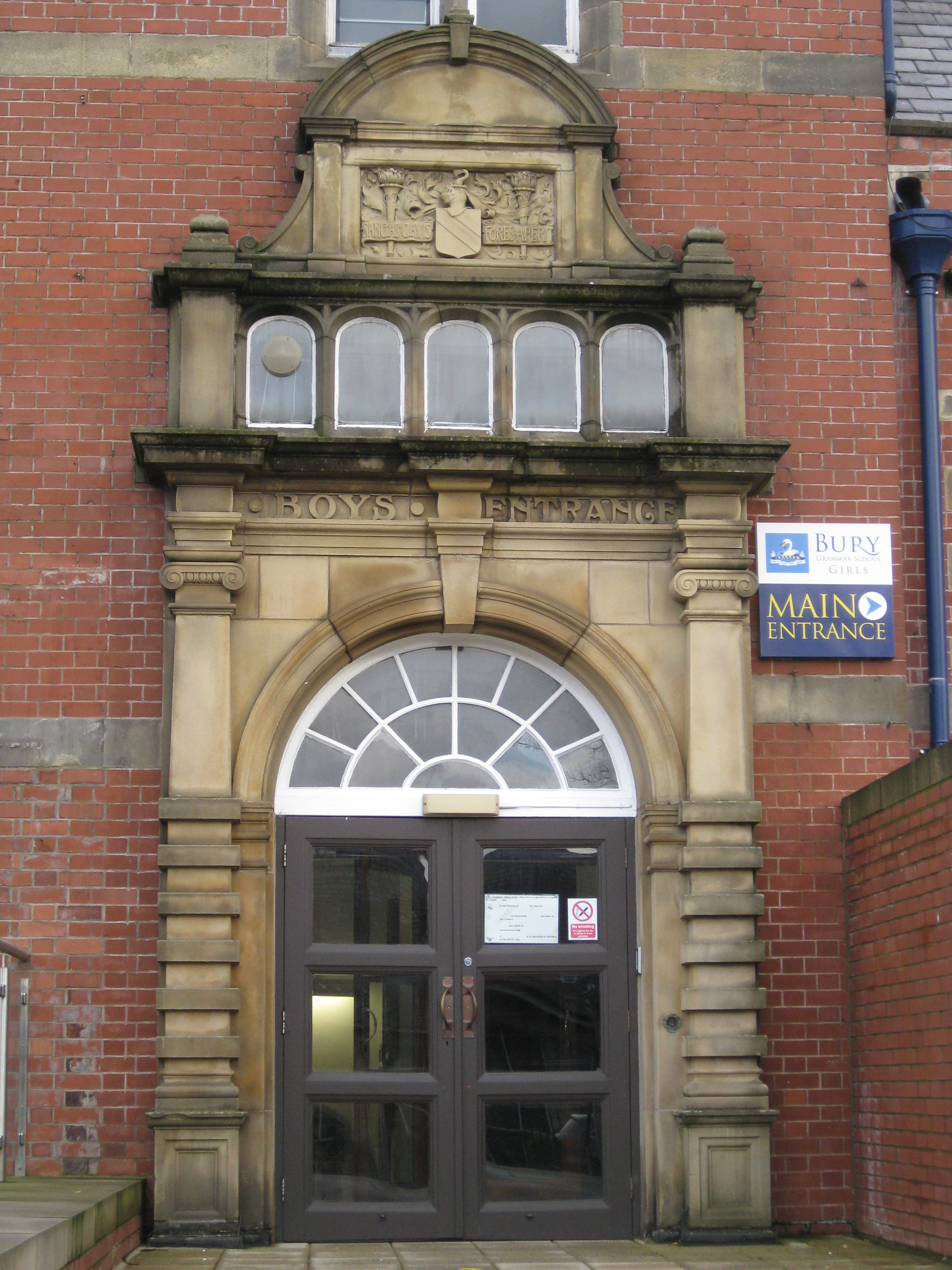
The former boys' entrance

With both the boys' and girls' sides of the building filled, the cornerstone of a new, shared assembly hall was laid (with full Masonic ritual) in 1906. First called simply The New Hall, it was soon renamed after its donor, Henry Whitehead, High Sheriff of Lancashire and a descendant of Roger Kay. The hall was opened by Alice Stanley, Countess of Derby in 1907 using a golden key and in 1908 was renamed the Roger Kay Hall. The two schools shared the buildings, but they remained two very separate institutions, divided by a green baize door. The boys' school, for example, held morning prayers first each day. As the boys trooped out through the door from the boys' half of the building, so the girls trooped in from theirs.

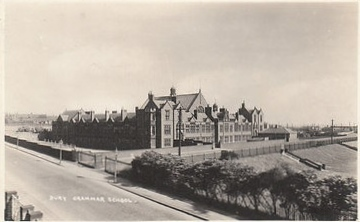
1906 postcard showing the playing fields on which the boys' school now stands

In wartime, the girls set to supporting the troops. Letters from Commander Kitchener (son of Lord Kitchener) of H.M.S. Ajax during World War I speak of books and cakes sent by the girls on several occasions. One James Law wrote on behalf of himself and another Bury man, both serving on Ajax, who visited the school in March 1916. Commander Kitchener noted later that "they seem to have been treated below Royalty but above a Prime Minister." There are also letters referring to support for the Church Army, the Minesweepers' Fund, the Red Cross Comforts Section and various refugee organisations. In World War II, the girls were found knitting for the troops and the Merchant Navy, making of camouflage nets, offering financial and material help to refugees and those in bombed areas.

Bury was considered a neutral area in WWII, so the school need not be evacuated, but there were other problems. Air-raid shelters were a necessity and negotiations to provide them began in April 1939. It was not until the end of that year that the provision was adequate. School opened on 19 September and many pupils arrived from evacuation areas. In winter school finished at 3 p.m. to ease the transport situation and to allow cleaning to be done before blackout. Miss Perigo, who became Headmistress in September 1940, later recalled sleeping on a sofa in her study when taking her turn on firewatch.

The school had grown considerably during the tenure of Kitchener's successor, Miss Nellie Neild, headmistress from September 1919 to 1940. The archives show that the number of girls in school rose from 23 in 1884 to 401 in 1940. Numbers continued to rise during the headship of Miss Perigo, to 521 by 1954. Inevitably, demand for places grew from 1944 when the School became a direct grant grammar school under the Butler Education Act.

Miss Dorothy Lester was Headmistress from 1954 until 1979 and during that time oversaw a phase of considerable development to the buildings. It was in Lester's time that the boys moved to a new school building across Bridge Road from the existing school, easing for a time the girls' school's difficulties finding room. Expanding to fill the available space, the girls' school reached 1 000 pupils in 1984, during the headship of Miss Joyce Batty.

== The school today ==
=== Structure ===
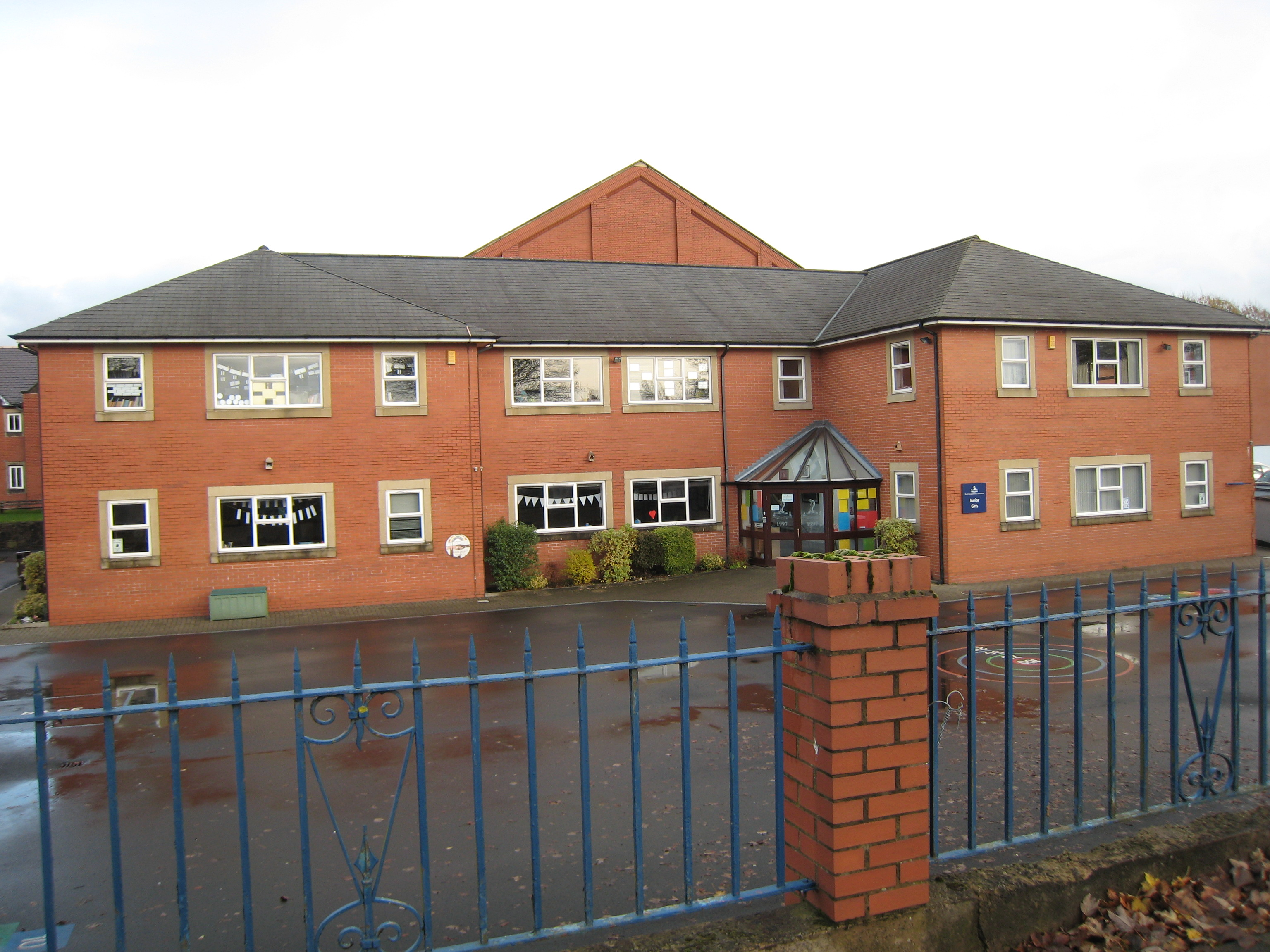
Junior School for Girls

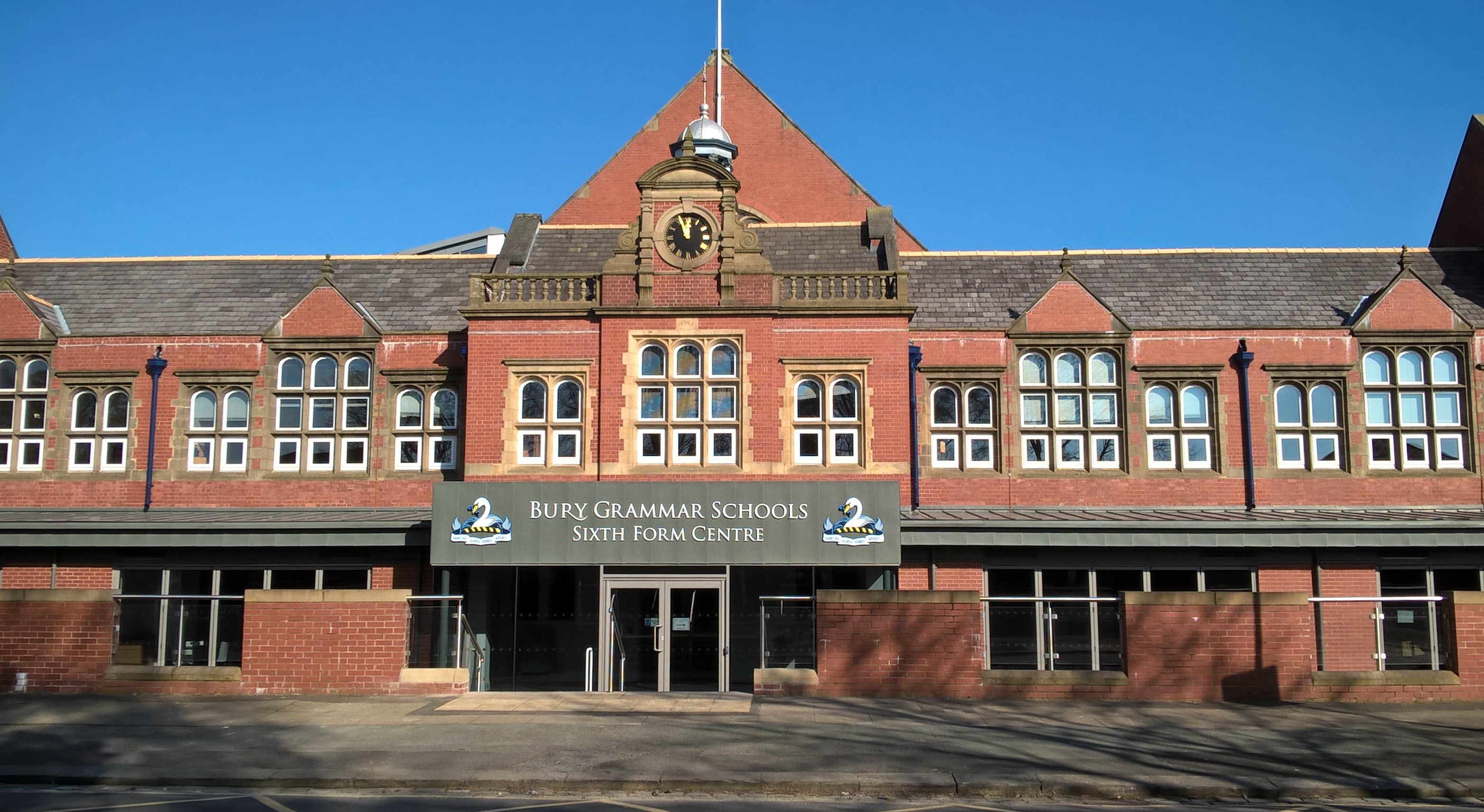
Sixth Form Centre

The school currently consists of co-educational nursery (Cygnets), co-educational infants schools (ages 3 – 7), co-educational junior (ages 7 – 11), single-sex senior schools (ages 11 – 16) and a co-educational sixth form (ages 16 – 18).

=== Curriculum ===
All girls follow a core of English language and English literature, at least one MFL, sciences and mathematics to GCSE level, together with an enhancement programme of PSE and citizenship, Religious Studies, ICT and PE. Most girls take 10 examination subjects, including at least one humanity. Their choice is made from a wide list of subjects including art & design, business studies, drama, food & nutrition, geography, history and textile technology.

Options at 'A' level include, business studies, Classics, economics, English literature, government and politics, maths, sciences, MFL, music, psychology and theatre studies.

Pupils leaving the school proceed to a wide range of universities, including Oxbridge, as well as directly into industry and commerce.

=== The campus ===
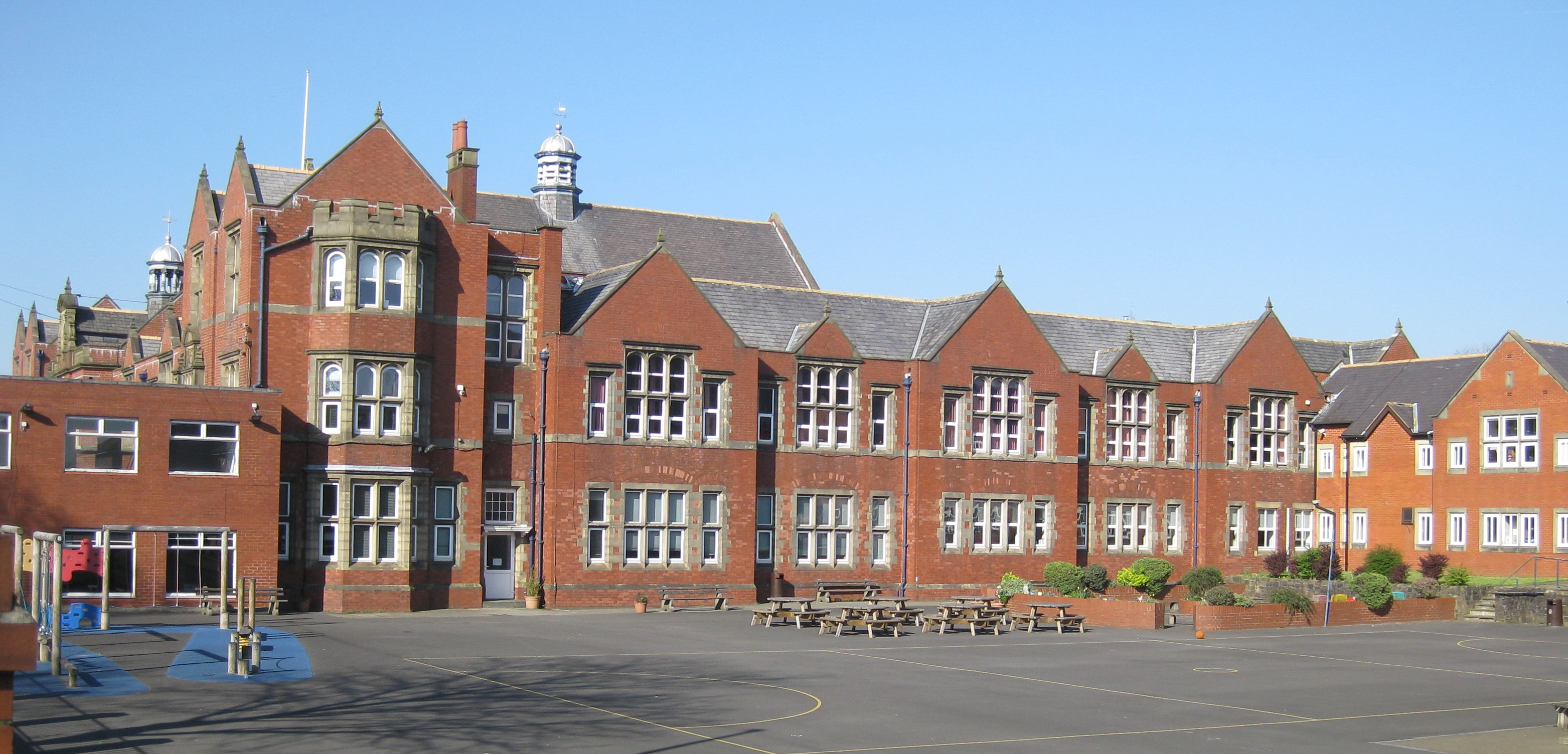
main building south side from Bridge Road

The school occupies a 3.62 hectares (8.95 acres) campus between the East Lancs Railway and Bridge Street. The 1906 building has been adapted and developed many times during the last century. Facilities include a sports hall, recently redeveloped to include a fitness centre in additional to the traditional gym. There are specialist classrooms for science, art, DT, and food and textiles technology, as well as a music suite with music technology room, and several ICT suites throughout the campus.

=== Sport ===
The school offers the traditional girls' school combination of netball and hockey, but the girls also have the opportunity to engage in a wide range of sports including Association football, athletics, badminton, cross-country running, swimming and tennis.

=== Performing arts ===
The school has a variety of choirs, orchestras, quartets and bands which regularly perform in concert. Music groups annually go on tour in Europe and over the past few years have performed in the Czech Republic, Poland, Hungary, Italy, France, Spain, Holland, Austria, Switzerland, and have also visited the United States.

Drama lessons are part of the timetable, but there are also opportunities for drama beyond the curriculum, too. The school puts on regular stage plays and musicals, often in collaboration with the boys' school.

=== Houses ===
In 1920, following the lead of the boys, the girls' school introduced a house system. There were five houses, into which girls were placed depending on where they lived. The houses were named after Herbert, Lord Kitchener (Bury), Sir Robert Peel (Walmersley), George, Lord Byron (Rochdale), Robert, Lord Clive (Prestwich) and Samuel Crompton (Ainsworth and Bolton). Each of these men had some association with the locality from which the girls in the house were drawn. In 1950, the house system was changed since some houses had many more members that others, which rendered inter-house competitions unfair. The new houses were named after then famous women: Elizabeth Garrett Anderson (red badge), Frances Mary Buss (green badge), Edith Cavell (blue and white badge), Elizabeth Fry (orange badge), Octavia Hill (originally turquoise, later purple, badge) and Florence Nightingale (yellow badge). The girls' school now has 4 houses, named after the first four headmistresses:
Lester
Kitchener
Nield
Perigo

Membership of different houses is indicated by a circular badge which bears the house colour. These houses are used to form teams for interhouse competitions.

=== Publications and alumni activities ===
In 1912 the first girls’ school magazine was published and the Old Girls’ Association was founded with its own magazine, The Old Girls’ Record, first being published in 1923-1924.

=== Inter school co-operation ===
Although still functioning as separate institutions, the boys’ and girls’ schools have long shared a single board of governors. They are also served by a single Bursar/Clerk to the Governors and development office. There is a tradition of boys and girls uniting for dramatic productions and musical concerts and, since 1992, membership of the boys' school CCF has been open to members of the girls' school. Pupils in the sixth forms of the two schools have long mixed socially; the imminent completion of a joint sixth form centre will mean that some 'A' level subjects will be taught jointly across the two schools.

== Link with Harvard College and the Henry Dunster Society ==
The Henry Dunster Society, an organisation inaugurated at Harvard University in September 2008, is intended to bring together from time to time the alumni/ae of the Bury Grammar Schools and to help them support new initiatives for the schools. The connection with Harvard College started with Henry Dunster. Dunster was born near Bury and attended Bury Grammar School. He went up to Magdalene College, Cambridge, and after graduation became the curate of Bury Parish Church, a living in the patronage of the Earl of Derby. Returning to Bury, Dunster became the third headmaster of the school. Dunster left his posts in Bury in 1640 when, like many other Puritans dissatisfied with developments in both church and state, and probably in anticipation of a civil war, he emigrated to Massachusetts. Soon after his arrival, Dunster was asked and agreed to become the first president of Harvard College, now Harvard University. Although few documents survive to explain how Dunster thought of himself, he did use a phrase in one letter, ego enim Lancastrensis sum, suggesting that he was a modest, hard-working, Lancashire lad, proud of his northern English origins and of his noted Lancashire accent. Dunster, a Professor of Oriental Languages, founded the first printing press in America at Harvard in 1648.

Derek Calrow, an Old Clavian, a Governor and Chair of the Schools' Development Committee, serves as the Patron of the Henry Dunster Society.

== Headmistresses ==
Bury Girls' High School (1884-1900)

- Jane P. Kitchener - 1884−1919
- Helen (Nellie) Nield - 1919−1940
- Grace Perigo - 1940−1954
- L Dorothy Lester - 1954−1979
- Joyce E. Batty - 1979−1987
- Janet Lawley - 1987−1998
- Caroline H Thompson - 1998−2002
- Roberta Georghiou - 2003−2015
- Jo Anderson - 2015−present

== Notable Old Claviennes ==
- Christine Nuttall OBE (1931-2020), specialist in TEFL
- Victoria Wood (1953-2016), comedian, actress and writer
- Diane Coyle (born 1961), economist, former advisor to HM Treasury, journalist, Vice-Chairman of the BBC Trust
- Rowetta Satchell (born 1966), singer
- Victoria Derbyshire (born 1968), broadcaster
- Nicola Shindler (born 1968), Chief Executive of Red Productions Company Ltd
- Amy Nuttall (born 1982), actress and singer; appeared as Chloe Atkinson in Yorkshire TV's Emmerdale
- Kate O'Flynn (born 1986), actress
- Kristrún Frostadóttir (born 1988), Prime Minister of Iceland
- Kate Cross (born 1991) England International cricketer

== See also ==
Bury Grammar School
