= Sam Adams (footballer, born 1989) =

Ghanaian professional footballer

Personal information
- Date of birth: 2 October 1989 (age 37)
- Place of birth: Kumasi, Ghana
- Position: Midfielder

Team information
- Current team: Aduana Stars
- Number: 18

Senior career*
Years	Team	Apps	(Gls)
2016–2019	Aduana Stars	57	(11)
2019	Asante Kotoko	3	(0)
2020–	Aduana Stars	74	(15)
- * Club domestic league appearances and goals as of 15 January 2023

Sam Adams (born 2 October 1989) is a Ghanaian professional footballer who plays as a midfielder for Ghanaian Premier League side Aduana Stars. Adams won the Ghana Premier League in 2017 and the Ghana Super Cup in 2018 during his first stint with Aduana Stars. He joined Asante Kotoko in December 2019 but left after 8 months after his contract was terminated only to rejoin Aduana Stars in 2020.

== Career ==
=== Aduana Stars ===
Adams started his career with Aduana Stars, eventually becoming a key player of the squad in the future. His first stint with the club was from 2014 to 2019. During the 2016 season, he played 11 league matches and scored a goal to help Aduana place 2nd, trailing by just two points to the eventual winners Wa All Stars. The following season, he played a pivotal role by playing in 24 league matches out of 30, provided 4 assists and scored 7 goals to push the Dormaa-based side to the pinnacle of the league for the second time in the club's history. On 15 October 2017, he scored the decisive goal from the penalty spot in the late minutes of a 2–1 victory over Elmina Sharks in Dormaa to help the team win the league with one match standing.

In November 2017, after his impressive performance in the 2016 season, he was linked with moves to Medeama SC and Accra Hearts of Oak. Adams however penned down a new 2-year contract, extending his stay with the club till 2019. He played an integral role in the club's 2018 CAF Champions league and 2018 CAF Confederations Cup campaigns, helping them to reach the group stages of the latter. Adams scored the only goal after converting a second half penalty to secure a 1–0 slim first leg victory over ES Sétif during the 2018 CAF Champions League qualifying round. Aduana lost the second leg by 4–0 loss leading to an exit from the Champions League and a demotion to the CAF Confederations Cup.

On 8 April 2018, during their 2018 CAF Confederations Cup qualifying round, he scored 2 goals after converting two penalties to push them to a convincing 6–1 first leg victory over Fosa Juniors from Madagascar. Aduana subsequently went on to qualify for the group stages on 7–3 aggregate.

=== Asante Kotoko ===
In December 2019, Adams joined Asante Kotoko SC on a free transfer. He signed a two-year deal with club after passing his medicals. During the 2019–20 Ghana Premier League season, he featured in only 3 matches before the league was brought to a halt as a result of the COVID-19 pandemic. However, in September 2020, he was deemed as surplus to the squad as his 2-year contract was terminated after spending just 8 months with the Kumasi-based club.

=== Return to Aduana Stars ===
On 31 October 2020, with the league set to restart in November 2020, for the 2020–21 Ghana Premier League season, he rejoined his previous club Aduana Stars after his contract was mutually terminated by Asante Kotoko. On 25 April 2021, he scored a brace in the first 18 minutes, to help Aduana to a 2–1 victory over Elmina Sharks and return them to winning ways after a heavy 4–0 defeat to Bechem United in the previous game week.

== Style of play ==
Adams is a set piece taker, scoring several spot kicks whilst playing for Aduana Stars. Adams can play as an attacking midfielder, central midfielder, or a winger.

== Honours ==
Aduana Stars

- Ghana Premier League: 2017
- Ghana Super Cup: 2018
