= Personal and social education =

Component of the state school curriculum in Scotland and Wales

Personal and social education (PSE) is a component of the state school curriculum in Scotland and Wales. PSE became a statutory requirement in schools in September 2003, and is compulsory for all students at key stages 1, 2, 3 and 4 (5 to 16 years old), and shares some similar elements with Personal, social, health and economic education and citizenship education in England. These include:

- local and global communities
- sex education
- spirituality
- morals
- environmental issues

== PSE framework ==
For each key stage, learning outcomes for knowledge and understanding are set in each of the Aspects (listed below); additionally, learning outcomes for the development of attitudes and values and skills are prescribed across all aspects. ACCAC, the curriculum authority for Wales (part of the Welsh Assembly Government from 1 April 2006), published these in the PSE framework (2000). While it is not compulsory for schools to use the framework, they are expected to use schemes of work in order to standardize practice across teachers and classes.

Aspects:

- Community
- Emotional
- Environmental
- Learning
- Moral
- Physical
- Sexual
- Social
- Spiritual
- Vocational

== See also ==
- Education in Wales
- Personal, Social, Health and Economic (PSHE) education (the equivalent in England and Scotland)
