= Christine Nuttall =

Teacher of English as a Foreign Language

Christine Nuttall OBE
- Born: Christine Elizabeth Nuttall; 1931; Holcombe Brook
- Died: 21 May 2020 (aged 88–89)
- Education: University of St. Andrews, University of Manchester
- Occupations: specialist in Teaching English as a Foreign Language and applied linguistics
- Years active: 1950s to 1980s
- Employer(s): British Council, University of Edinburgh
- Notable work: "Teaching Reading Skills in a Foreign Language"
- Honours: OBE

Christine Nuttall (1931–2020), OBE was a British academic and teacher of English as a Foreign Language who worked for over 30 years globally, and had published a guide to Teaching Reading Skills in a Foreign Language which remains a key resource for international teaching and learning a foreign language.

== Early life and education ==
Born Christine Elizabeth Nuttall in 1931 in Holcombe Brook, Bury, Manchester to Alfred Nuttall, a stockbroker, and Marjorie (née Broome), a teacher. She had a younger sister, Barbara. Her father died when she was five years old.

Nuttall went to Bury Grammar School before going to St. Andrew's University graduating in English and philosophy in 1953, and then completed a Masters (M.A.) in linguistics at Manchester University.

== Career ==
Nuttall spent a year teaching English in Finland, then four years in Nigeria as a lecturer in English and studied the Hausa language.

Starting in the 1960s she became an English Language teaching advisor and by 1994 was also a product development manager for the British Council. Her postings were in Nigeria, Milan, Ghana, Iran and Malaysia as well as working in China and Namibia. Her work Teaching Reading Skills in a Foreign Language was published in three editions and quoted by language teachers and linguistics specialists in different countries from 1982 up to at least 2017.

She was awarded an OBE in 1982, and joined the University of Edinburgh applied linguistics department in 1985, becoming the director of the MSc course before retiring in 1989. She moved to her home in Broughton-in-Furness, Cumbria (which she had lent to friends to use during the years when she had travelled) and joined development committee the Cumbria Wildlife Trust.

Nuttall died on 21 May 2020, aged 89.
