= Jean-Claude Marobe =

Malagasy footballer

Personal information
- Full name: Jean-Claude Lolody Marobe
- Date of birth: 18 June 1993 (age 33)
- Place of birth: Toamasina
- Date of death: 4 July 2025 (aged 32)
- Height: 1.75 m (5 ft 9 in)
- Position: Defender

Senior career*
Years	Team	Apps	(Gls)
-2024	Fosa Juniors FC		
2016	→ AS Adema		
2024-2025	Anse Réunion		

International career^{‡}
2015–2019	Madagascar	16	(0)
- * Club domestic league appearances and goals ‡ National team caps and goals as of 7 November 2019

Jean-Claude Marobe (born 18 June 1993) was a Malagasy football defender.
