= Youssef Kaddioui =

Moroccan footballer

Personal information
- Full name: Youssef Kaddioui Idrissi
- Date of birth: 28 September 1984 (age 42)
- Place of birth: El Jadida, Morocco
- Height: 1.64 m (5 ft 5 in)
- Position: Winger

Youth career
- ?–1999: Difaa El Jadida

Senior career*
Years	Team	Apps	(Gls)
1999–2003	Difaa El Jadida		
2003–2009	FAR Rabat		
2009–2011	Al-Wehda	25	(10)
2010	→ FAR Rabat (loan)	9	(1)
2011–2012	Wydad Casablanca	23	(2)
2012–2013	FAR Rabat	28	(5)
2013–2014	Al-Kharaitiyat	21	(8)
2014–2015	Al Dhafra SCC	18	(4)
2015–2017	Raja Casablanca		
2017–2019	FAR Rabat	13	(2)
2019	→ RCA Zemamra (loan)		
2019–2020	Al-Kharaitiyat	18	(2)

International career
2004–2013	Morocco	7	(1)
- * Club domestic league appearances and goals

Youssef Kaddioui Idrissi (Arabic: يوسف القديوي; born 28 September 1984) is a Moroccan former professional footballer who played as a winger. He made seven appearances for the Morocco national team scoring once.

== Career ==
Keddioui won the 2008 Coupe du Trône with FAR Rabat.

Keddioui played for the "B" Morocco national team in a 2009 African Championship of Nations qualifying match against Algeria on 3 May 2008.

In July 2009, Keddioui joined Saudi Arabian Professional League side Al-Wehda Club.

In January 2019, Keddioui was loaned out to RCA Zemamra from FAR Rabat.
