= Jonathan Ernest =

Mauritian footballer

Personal information
- Position: Forward

Team information
- Current team: AS Port-Louis 2000

Senior career*
Years	Team	Apps	(Gls)
–2007	Faucon Flacq SC		
2007–	AS Port-Louis 2000		

International career^{‡}
2009–2010	Mauritius	3	(0)
- * Club domestic league appearances and goals ‡ National team caps and goals as of 5 November 2019

Jonathan Ernest is a Mauritian football striker for AS Port-Louis 2000.
