= Pascoal Amorim =

Mozambican footballer

Personal information
- Full name: Pascoal Carlos Amorim
- Date of birth: 29 July 1995 (age 31)
- Place of birth: Beira, Mozambique
- Height: 1.73 m (5 ft 8 in)
- Position: Defender

Team information
- Current team: UD Songo

Senior career*
Years	Team	Apps	(Gls)
–2015	Sporting Beira		
2016–2017	Clube Ferroviário da Beira		
2018–	UD Songo		

International career^{‡}
2016–	Mozambique	2	(0)
- * Club domestic league appearances and goals ‡ National team caps and goals as of 7 November 2019

Pascoal Amorim (born 29 July 1995) is a Mozambican football defender for UD Songo.
