= Samba Sow =

Samba Sow may refer to:

- Samba Ousemane Sow (born 1964), Malian doctor, World Health Organization director general of the Center for Vaccine Development in Mali and professor
- Samba Sow (footballer, born 1984), Senegalese footballer
- Samba Sow (footballer, born 1989), Malian footballer
