= Lamin Charty =

Gambian international footballer

Personal information
- Date of birth: 8 April 1996 (age 30)
- Place of birth: Busumbala, Gambia
- Height: 1.75 m (5 ft 9 in)
- Position: Midfielder

Team information
- Current team: AS Douanes

Senior career*
Years	Team	Apps	(Gls)
2014–2018	Banjul Hawks		
2018–	AS Douanes		

International career^{‡}
2015–	Gambia	6	(0)
- * Club domestic league appearances and goals as of 13:56, 8 April 2020 (UTC) ‡ National team caps and goals as of 13:56, 8 April 2020 (UTC)

Lamin Charty (born 8 April 1996) is a Gambian international footballer who plays for AS Douanes, as a midfielder.

== Career ==
Born in Busumbala, he has played club football for Banjul Hawks and AS Douanes.

He made his international debut for Gambia in 2015.
