= Rabemananjara Stadium =

Sports venue in Mahajanga, Madagascar

- Rabemananjara
- Interactive map of Rabemananjara Stadium
- Full name: Rabemananjara Stadium
- Location: Mahajanga, Madagascar
- Coordinates: 15.7178°S 46.3158°E
- Capacity: 8,000
- Surface: Artificial Grass

Tenants
- Fosa Juniors FC; Madagascar national football team

Rabemananjara Stadium is a multi-purpose stadium in Mahajanga, Madagascar. It is currently used mostly for Association football matches and hosts the home matches of Tana FC Formation of the THB Champions League. The stadium has a capacity 8,000 spectators.
