= Cheick Tidiane Niang =

Malian footballer

Personal information
- Date of birth: 8 December 1996 (age 29)
- Position: Forward

Team information
- Current team: Djoliba AC

Senior career*
Years	Team	Apps	(Gls)
2016–	Djoliba AC		

International career^{‡}
2019–	Mali	1	(0)
- * Club domestic league appearances and goals ‡ National team caps and goals as of 7 November 2019

Cheick Tidiane Niang (born 8 December 1996) is a Malian football striker for Djoliba AC.
