= Ludovic Lafoudre =

Mauritian footballer

Personal information
- Date of birth: 1 December 1987 (age 38)
- Position: Midfielder

Team information
- Current team: AS Port-Louis 2000

Senior career*
Years	Team	Apps	(Gls)
- AS Port-Louis 2000

International career^{‡}
2015	Mauritius	1	(0)
- * Club domestic league appearances and goals ‡ National team caps and goals as of 5 November 2019

Ludovic Lafoudre (born 1 December 1987) is a Mauritian football midfielder for AS Port-Louis 2000.
