= Baba Sow =

Senegalese footballer

Personal information
- Full name: Baba Sow Basse
- Date of birth: 26 July 1995 (age 31)
- Position: Midfielder

Team information
- Current team: Montalegre

Youth career
- –2013: Étoile Lusitana
- 2013–2014: Chaves

Senior career*
Years	Team	Apps	(Gls)
2014–2015	Pedras Salgadas	26	(1)
2015–2016	Mirandela	27	(7)
2016–2018	Montalegre	56	(16)
2018–2019	Varzim B	4	(0)
2018–2021	Varzim	31	(2)
2021–	Montalegre	4	(0)
- * Club domestic league appearances and goals ‡ National team caps and goals as of 21 October 2021

Baba Sow (born 26 July 1995) is a Senegalese football midfielder who plays for Montalegre. He played on the Portuguese second tier for Varzim.
