= Yakubu Mohammed (footballer, born 1990) =

Ghanaian footballer

Personal information
- Date of birth: 26 July 1990 (age 36)
- Place of birth: Ghana
- Position: Forward

Team information
- Current team: Futuro Kings
- Number: 28

Senior career*
Years	Team	Apps	(Gls)
–2013	Ashanti Gold		
2013–2014	Maritzburg United	13	(1)
2014–2015	Ashanti Gold		
2015–2016	Raja Casablanca	5	(0)
2016	→ Union Aït Melloul (loan)		
2017–2019	Asante Kotoko		
2018	→ Elmina Sharks (loan)		
2019–	Futuro Kings		

International career^{‡}
2015	Ghana	1	(0)
- * Club domestic league appearances and goals ‡ National team caps and goals as of 27 May 2015

Yakubu Mohammed (born 26 July 1990) is a Ghanaian footballer who plays as a forward for the Equatorial Guinean club Futuro Kings FC. He is also a former member of the Ghana national team.
