= Scheme of work =

Concept in pedagogy

A scheme of work is a kind of plan that outlines all the learning to be covered over a given period of time (usually a term or a whole school year).

It defines the structure and content of an academic course. It splits an often-multi-year curriculum into deliverable units of work, each of a far shorter weeks' duration (e.g. two or three weeks). Each unit of work is then analysed out into teachable individual topics of even shorter duration (e.g. two hours or less).

Better schemes of work map out clearly how resources (e.g. books, equipment, time) and class activities (e.g. teacher-talk, group work, practicals, discussions) and assessment strategies (e.g. tests, quizzes, Q&A, homework) will be used to teach each topic and assess students' progress in learning the material associated with each topic, unit and the scheme of work as a whole. As students progress through the scheme of work, there is an expectation that their perception of the interconnections between topics and units will be enhanced.

Schemes of work may include times and dates (deadlines) for delivering the different elements of the curriculum. Philosophically, this is linked to a belief that all students should be exposed to all elements of the curriculum such that those who are able to "keep up" ("the best" / elite) do not miss out on any content and can achieve the highest grades. This might be described as a "traditionalist" view.

There is a conflicting philosophical d progress at its own pace: such that no student is "left behind". Whilst the remaining students "catch up", those students who understand quickly should be placed in a "holding pattern" full of puzzles and questions that challenge them to connect recent learning with longer-established learning (they may also be encouraged to spend a small amount of time enhancing their understanding by supporting teaching staff in unpicking underlying errors/questions of fellow students who have not grasped recent ideas as quickly). This view might be described as a "Mastery" approach. In mathematics teaching in England it is strongly supported by the Government-funded National Centre for Excellence in Teaching Mathematics based on research guided by the globally-exceptional performance of schools in Singapore and Shanghai.

== Curriculum ==
The scheme of work is usually an interpretation of a specification or syllabus and can be used as a guide throughout the course to monitor progress against the original plan. Schemes of work can be shared with students so that they have an overview of their course.

The ultimate source of the specification or syllabus is a curriculum. Curricula are typically defined by Government and hence by law and/or regulation. Accordingly, each country has its own (though some countries choose to adopt curricula defined by other countries).

In generating a scheme of work, it is vital to have detailed regard to the legally-required curriculum of the country in which the scheme of work is to be delivered. These are typically defined, in detail, by subject. Understanding the subtleties and nuances of their presentation is of vital importance when defining the most useful schemes of work.

=== England ===
For maintained schools and exam boards in England, the National Curriculum is set by Department for Education such that all children growing up in England have a broadly similar education.

The curriculum for Primary education (ages 4/5 to 11) and Secondary education (ages 11 to 18) in England is divided into five Key Stages. Key stages 1 and 2 are delivered at Primary Schools. Key Stages 3, 4 and 5 are delivered at Secondary Schools.

==== England - Mathematics ====
===== English Primary Schools: Key Stages 1 & 2 [ages 5 to 11] =====
The expectations for delivering the National Curriculum for mathematics in England at Key Stages 1 and 2 are tightly defined with clear time-linked objectives. The Department for Education has provided an initial annual scheme of work (or set of expectations) for each school/academic year from Year 1 (age 5/6) to and including Year 6 (age 10/11). This does not specify the order of teaching each topic within each year; but does provide guidance and does set out the expectations of what is to be taught and learned by the end of each year of students' primary education.

===== English Secondary Schools: Key Stages 3 and 4 [ages 11 to 16] =====
The National Curriculum for mathematics in England is also tightly defined at Key Stages 3 and 4. However, each individual English school's mathematics department is given greater freedom to decide when and how to deliver the content. By contrast to the national curriculum for England's primary schools, there are no annual expectations. Instead, guidance is set by reference to what is to be taught and learned by the end of Key Stage 3 [the end of year 9 (ages 13/14)] and by the end of Key Stage 4 [the end of year 11 (ages 15/16)].

It is notable that the curriculum for Key Stage 4 is intended by the Department for Education to examine all learning from Key Stages 1 to 4. In particular, topics listed in Key Stage 3 explicitly form part of the curriculum for Key Stage 4 (such that the foundations of earlier learning are reinforced whilst building upon them). Accordingly, students who have struggled with the harder-to-understand elements in the past are given the opportunity to master the Key Stage 3 content whilst others build higher, in parallel.

===== English Secondary Schools: GCSEs [typically age 15/16+] =====
It is mandatory in England for students to have taken a GCSE in mathematics by the year of their sixteenth birthday.

It is notable that the subject content agreed between the Department of Education and The Office of Qualifications and Examinations Regulation (Ofqual) [the exam board regulator for GCSEs, AS-Levels and A-Levels] is highlighted in subtly different ways to the subject content of the national curriculum for Key Stage 4.

The latter features two levels of expectation (plain text versus {bold and 'braces'}); the former features three (plain text, underlined text and bold text). The subtly of the distinction enabled more perceptive students, parents and educators to determine (or speculate about) the way in which content is (or should be) distributed between the two different sets of GCSE mathematics examinations (Foundation and Higher): these two sets overlap (suggesting the underlined topics exist in the intersection between the two sets of topics).

It is also notable that the curriculum for GCSE is intended by the Department for Education to examine all learning from Key Stages 1 to 4. In particular, topics listed in Key Stage 3 explicitly form part of the curriculum for Key Stage 4 and the GCSE (such that the foundations of earlier learning are reinforced whilst building upon them). Accordingly, students who have struggled with the harder-to-understand elements in the past are given the opportunity to master the Key Stage 3 content whilst others build higher, in parallel.

===== English Secondary Schools: AS and A-Levels [typically age 17+] =====
AS and A-Levels in mathematics are not mandatory.

Accordingly, there is no national curriculum for AS and A-Level mathematics in England. However, there is agreed subject content required by the Department for Education for AS and A level specifications in mathematics.

== Elements ==
The key parts of a "scheme of work" may include:

Content 1
Objectives or Outcomes
Methods of delivery (student and teacher activity)
Assessment strategies
Resources
Other Remarks

scheme of Work

Example of a simple scheme of work

See also Lesson Plans.
