= 2017–18 Raja CA season =

Raja CA
2017–18 season
- President: Said Hasbane (until 6 April); Mohamed Aouzal (provisional commission)
- Manager: Juan Carlos Garrido
- Stadium: Stade Mohamed V
- Botola: 6th
- Throne Cup: Winners
- CAF Confederation Cup: Winners
- Top goalscorer: League: Mouhcine Iajour (17); All: Mouhcine Iajour (25)
- Biggest win: 5–1 v CA Khénifra (Home, 15 October 2017, Throne Cup)
Home colours	Away colours	Third colours

The 2017–18 season is Raja CA's 69th season in existence and the club's 62nd consecutive season in the top flight of Moroccan football. It covers a period from 1 July 2017 to 30 June 2018.

== Current squad ==
Note: Flags indicate national team as defined under FIFA eligibility rules; some limited exceptions apply. Players may hold more than one non-FIFA nationality.

No.	Pos.	Nation	Player
1	GK	MAR	Anas Zniti (Captain)
3	FW	MAR	Hamza Toumi
4	MF	MAR	Zakaria El Hilali
12	GK	MAR	Mohamed Chennouf
13	DF	MAR	Badr Banoun
14	MF	COD	Lema Mabidi
15	FW	MAR	Mohamed Bouain
16	DF	MAR	Mohamed Oulhaj
7	FW	MAR	Zakaria Hadraf
18	FW	MAR	Abdelilah Hafidi
29	FW	MAR	Ayoub Joulal
—	FW	MAR	Ayoub Sabiri
28	MF	MAR	Karim Nouamani

No.	Pos.	Nation	Player
20	DF	MAR	Abdeljalil Jbira
21	DF	MAR	Adil Karrouchy
24	FW	MAR	Mahmoud Benhalib
25	DF	MAR	Omar Boutayeb
96	MF	MAR	Walid Sebbar
9	FW	MAR	Mouhcine Iajour
55	FW	MAR	Abderrahim Achchakir
26	DF	MAR	Mohamed Khaldan
17	MF	MAR	Mounir Obbadi
30	FW	MAR	Abdeladim Khadrouf

- Head coach: Juan Carlos Garrido
- Assistant-coach: Mohammed Adil Erradi

== Transfers ==
=== In (summer) ===
Note: Flags indicate national team as defined under FIFA eligibility rules; some limited exceptions apply. Players may hold more than one non-FIFA nationality.

No.	Pos.	Nation	Player
7	FW	MAR	Zakaria Hadraf (from DHJ)
9	FW	MAR	Mouhcine Iajour (from Al-Khor)
55	DF	MAR	Abderrahim Achchakir (from AS FAR (football))
—	MF	MAR	Zakaria El Hilali (on loan from Chabab Rif Al Hoceima)

=== Out (Summer) ===
Note: Flags indicate national team as defined under FIFA eligibility rules; some limited exceptions apply. Players may hold more than one non-FIFA nationality.

No.	Pos.	Nation	Player
—	MF	MAR	Zakaria El Hachimi (to Wydad Athletic Club)
29	FW	MAR	Johan Lengoualama (to (Algeria) Wifaq stif)
—	GK	MAR	Hicham Allouch (Nahdat Berkane)

=== In (winter) ===
Note: Flags indicate national team as defined under FIFA eligibility rules; some limited exceptions apply. Players may hold more than one non-FIFA nationality.

No.	Pos.	Nation	Player
—	MF	MAR	Mounir Obbadi (from OGC Nice)
—	FW	MAR	Abdeladim Khadrouf (from Wydad AC)

=== Out (winter) ===
Note: Flags indicate national team as defined under FIFA eligibility rules; some limited exceptions apply. Players may hold more than one non-FIFA nationality.

No.	Pos.	Nation	Player
99	MF	MAR	Issam Erraki (to Al Raed)
11	FW	MAR	Zouheir El Ouassli (to (Morocco) Moghreb Tetouan)
5	DF	MAR	Jawad El Yamiq (to (Italy) Genoa)

== Competitions ==
=== Overview ===
Competition	First match	Last match	Starting round	Final position	Record							
Competition	First match	Last match	Starting round	Final position	Pld	W	D	L	GF	GA	GD	Win %
Botola	10 September 2017	20 May 2018	Matchday 1	6th	30	13	9	8	45	33	+12	43.33
Coupe du Trône	23 August 2017	18 November 2017	Round of 32	Winners	9	4	5	0	15	5	+10	44.44
CAF Confederation Cup	6 March 2018	16 May 2018	Preliminary round	Winners	6	3	3	0	13	6	+7	50.00
Total					45	20	17	8	73	44	+29	44.44

Last updated: 20 May 2018.
Source: Competitions

=== Botola ===
==== League table ====
Pos	Team	Pld	W	D	L	GF	GA	GD	Pts	Qualification or relegation
4	FUS Rabat	30	13	10	7	34	26	+8	49	
5	Difaâ El Jadidi	30	13	9	8	49	33	+16	48 (Note: Difaa Jadidi finished ahead of Raja Casablanca on head-to-head goal difference: Difaa Jadidi 2–1 Raja Casablanca, Raja Casablanca 3–2 Difaa Jadidi)	
6	Raja Casablanca	30	13	9	8	45	33	+12	48	Qualification for the CAF Confederation Cup (Note: Raja CA qualified for the Confederation Cup First round as the title holders, by winning the 2018 CAF Confederation Cup.)
7	Olympic Safi	30	10	13	7	32	28	+4	43 (Note: Olympic Safi finished ahead of AS FAR on head-to-head points: Olympic Safi 1–1 AS FAR, AS FAR 3–4 Olympic Safi)	
8	AS FAR	30	11	10	9	35	34	+1	43	

Source: frmf.ma
Rules for classification: 1) Points; 2) Head-to-head points; 3) Head-to-head goal difference; 4) Goal difference; 5) Goals scored; 6) Fair-play points; 7) Play-off.

==== Results summary ====
Overall								Home						Away					
Pld	W	D	L	GF	GA	GD	Pts	W	D	L	GF	GA	GD	W	D	L	GF	GA	GD
30	13	9	8	45	33	+12	48	8	5	2	27	15	+12	5	4	6	18	18	0

Last updated: 20 May 2018.
Source: Competitive matches

==== Result round by round ====
Round	1	2	3	4	5	6	7	8	9	10	11	12	13	14	15	16	17	18	19	20	21	22	23	24	25	26	27	28	29	30
Ground	A	H	H	A	H	A	H	A	H	H	A	H	A	H	A	H	A	A	H	A	H	H	H	A	A	H	A	A	H	A
Result	D	W	W	D	W	L	L	D	W	W	W	D	L	W	W	W	L	W	D	L	D	L	D	L	W	D	L	D	W	W
Position	6	8	5	3	3	2	2	4	4	2	2	1	2	2	3	2	1	2	2	2	3	3	3	3	3	6	3	7	7	6

Updated to match(es) played on 20 May 2018. Source: League matches
A = Away; H = Home; W = Win; D = Draw; L = Loss

==== Matches ====
10 September 2017 1	Olympique Khouribga	1–1	Raja CA	Khouribga
17:00 UTC+1	Aboubi		Benoun	Stadium: Complexe OCP; Attendance: 11,000

16 September 2017 2	Raja CA	2–0	FAR Rabat	Casablanca
17:00 UTC+1	Benhalib 53', 80'			Stadium: Stade Mohamed V Attendance: 43,000

23 September 2017 3	Raja CA	4–0	Kawkab Marrakech	Agadir
16:00 UTC+1	Achchakir 36'; Iajour 56' (72); Hafidi 58'			Stadium: Stade Adrar; Attendance: 5,000

1 October 2017 4	IR Tanger	1–1	Raja CA	Tangier
16:00 UTC+1	Lebhiri (yellow card) 32'; Serroukh (yellow card) 47'; Naghmi 55' (yellow card) 63'; Bouldini (yellow card) 84'; Thioune (yellow card) 88'; El Khaliqi (yellow card) 90+3'		Achchakir 23'; Jbira (yellow card) 32'; Benhalib (yellow card) 57'; Banoun (yellow card) 90+3'	Stadium: Stade Ibn Batouta; Attendance: 35,000; Referee: Redouane Jiyed

23 October 2017 5	Raja CA	2–1	Hassania Agadir	Casablanca
19:30 UTC+1	Iajour 45'; Erraki 90+2' pen.		Daoudi 82' pen.	Stadium: Stade Mohamed V Attendance: 45,000

29 October 2017 6	Olympic Safi	2–0	Raja CA	Safi
15:00 GMT	El Haj 32' Hamza Khabarovsk 83'			Stadium: Stade El Massira; Attendance: 5,000

5 November 2017 7	Raja CA	1–2	Chabab Atlas Khénifra	Casablanca
19:00 GMT	Abdelilah Hafidi 68'		Youssef El omari 88' Sayer Séné 90+2'	Stadium: Stade Mohamed V Attendance: 25,000

23 November 2017 8	FUS Rabat	0–0	Raja CA	Rabat
19:00 GMT				Stadium: Prince Moulay Abdellah Stadium

27 November 2017 9	Raja CA	3–1	Rapide Oued Zem	Rabat
17:00 GMT	Abdelkabir El Ouadi 49' Mohamed Khaldan 79' Badr Banoun 84'		Mamadou sidibé 69'	Stadium: Prince Moulay Abdellah Stadium; Attendance: 16,000

10 February 2018 10	Wydad Casablanca	1–2	Raja CA	Casablanca
15:00 UTC	Omar Boutayeb 20' OG		Mouhcine Iajour 34'; Badr Banoun 88'	Stadium: Stade Mohamed V

12 December 2017 11	Raja CA	3–2	Difaa El Jadida	Rabat
16:00 GMT	Jaouad El Yamiq 27' Mohamed Hamami csc 54' Mouhcine Iajour 63'		Ayoub Nanah 21' Hamid Ahedad 27'	Stadium: Prince Moulay Abdellah Stadium; Attendance: 18,000

19 December 2018 12	Moghreb Tétouan	1–3	Raja CA	Rabat
15:00 GMT	Anas Jabroun 59'		Mahmoud Benhalib 54'; Mouhcine Iajour 74' 92'	Stadium: Prince Moulay Abdellah Stadium

24 December 2017 13	Raja CA	1–1	Chabab Rif Al Hoceima	Casablanca
15:00 GMT	Jawad El Yamiq 87'		Echcharaf 56'	Stadium: Stade Mohamed V

27 December 2017 14	RS Berkane	1–0	Raja CA	Berkane
14:00 GMT	Ayoub El Kaabi 28'			Stadium: Stade Municipal de Berkane

30 December 2017 15	Raja CA	2–0	Racing de Casablanca	Casablanca
15:00 GMT	El Msane 38' OG; Mouhcine Iajour 80'			Stadium: Stade Mohamed V

14 February 2018 16	Raja CA	4–3	Olympique Khouribga	Casablanca
15:00 GMT	Mouhcine Iajour 50' 55' 90+4'; Lema Mabidi 51'		Adam Ennafati 27'; Ouchen 49' 88'	Stadium: Stade Mohamed V Attendance: 20,000

18 February 2018 17	FAR Rabat	2–1	Raja CA	Rabat
15:00			Abdeladim Khadrouf 22'	Stadium: Prince Moulay Abdellah Stadium

25 February 2018 18	Kawkab Marrakech	0–3	Raja CA	Marrakesh
			Mouhcine Iajour 60' 65'; Lema Mabidi 90+8'	Stadium: Marrakesh Stadium

2 March 2018 19	Raja CA	1–1	IR Tanger	Casablanca
	Mouhcine Iajour 57'			Stadium: Stade Mohamed V

10 March 2018 20	Hassania Agadir	1–0	Raja CA	Agadir
				Stadium: Stade Adrar

29 March 2018 21	Raja CA	0–0	Olympic Safi	Casablanca
				Stadium: Stade Mohamed V

1 April 2018 23	Raja CA	1–2	FUS Rabat	Casablanca
18:00 Gmt+1	Zakaria Hadraf 57' (pen.)			Stadium: Stade Mohamed V

14 April 2018 25	Raja CA	1–1	Wydad Casablanca	Casablanca
	Badr Benoun 88'			Stadium: Stade Mohamed V

22 April 2018 26	Difaa El Jadida	2–1	Raja CA	El Jadida
			Mouhcine Iajour 41' (pen.)	Stadium: Stade El Abdi

25 April 2018 22	Chabab Atlas Khénifra	2–3	Raja CA	Khénifra
			Badr Benoun 29'; Mouhcine Iajour 62'; Abderrahim Achchakir 84'	Stadium: Stade municipal of Khénifra

28 April 2018 27	Raja CA	0–0	Moghreb Tétouan	Casablanca
				Stadium: Stade Mohamed V

2 May 2018 24	Rapide Oued Zem	3–1	Raja CA	Oued Zem
			Benhalib 70'	Stadium: Stade Municipalo of Oued Zem

9 May 2018 28	Chabab Rif Al Hoceima	0–0	Raja CA	Al Hoceima
				Stadium: Stade Mimoun Al Arsi

12 May 2018 29	Raja CA	2–1	RS Berkane	Casablanca
	Mahmoud Benhalib 5'; Issoufou Dayo 66' (o.g.)			Stadium: Stade Mohamed V

20 May 2018 30	Racing de Casablanca	1–2	Raja CA	Casablanca
			Abdelkabir El Ouadi 9'; Mouhcine Iajour 33'	Stadium: Stade Père-Jégo

=== Moroccan Throne Cup ===
==== Round of 32 ====
23 August 2017 First leg	Raja CA	0-0	Olympique Dcheira	Casablanca
18:00 UTC+1				Stadium: Stade Mohammed V Attendance: 15,000; Referee: Hamza El Fareq

27 August 2017 Second leg	Olympique Dcheira	1-4 (1-4 agg.)	Raja CA	Dcheira
16:00 UTC+1			Benhalib 14'; Hadraf 43'; Iajour 50'; Erraki 90'	Stadium: Stade Ahmed Fana; Attendance: 5,000; Referee: Adil Zaourak

==== Round of 16 ====
26 September 2017 First leg	Raja CA	0-0	FUS Rabat	Rabat
18:00 UTC+1				Stadium: Prince Moulay Abdellah Stadium; Attendance: 5,000

12 October 2017 Second leg	FUS Rabat	1-2 (1-2 agg.)	Raja CA	Rabat
18:00 UTC+1	Ibrahim El Bahraoui 11'		37' Zakaria Hadraf; 57' Abdelilah Hafidi	Stadium: Stade de FUS; Attendance: 10,000

==== Quarter-finals ====
15 October 2017 First leg	Raja CA	5-1	Chabab Atlas Khénifra	Casablanca
19:30 UTC+1	Iajour 5' 90+3'; Hadraf 62'; El Yamiq 67'; Erraki 85'		79' (pen.) Alioune	Stadium: Stade Mohamed V Attendance: 35,000

19 October 2017 Second leg	Chabab Atlas Khénifra	0-2 (1-7 agg.)	Raja CA	Khénifra
15:30 UTC+1			Mouhcine Iajour 3' Ayoub Joulal 90'	Stadium: Stade municipal de Khénifra; Attendance: 5,000

==== Semi-finals ====
26 October 2017 First leg	FAR Rabat	1-1	Raja CA	Rabat
18:00 UTC+1	Mohamed El Fakih 3'		Mahmoud Benhalib 65'	Stadium: Prince Moulay Abdellah Stadium; Attendance: 30,000

2 November 2017 Second leg	Raja CA	0-0 (1-1 agg.)	FAR Rabat	Casablanca
19:30 GMT				Stadium: Stade Mohamed V

==== Final ====
18 November 2017 Final	Difaâ El Jadidi	1-1 (1-3 p)	Raja CA	Rabat
16:00 GMT	Hamid Ahaddad		Mouhcine Iajour	Stadium: Prince Moulay Abdellah Stadium; Attendance: 50,000

=== CAF Confederation Cup ===
==== First round ====
6 March 2018	Raja CA (Morocco)	1–1	(Mauritania) FC Nouadhibou	Stade Mohammed V, Casablanca
19:00 UTC+0	Khaldane 69'	Report	Voullany 79'	Attendance: 21,000; Referee: Mahmoud El Banna (Egypt)

17 March 2018	FC Nouadhibou (Mauritania)	2–4	(Morocco) Raja CA	Nouadhibou Municipal Stadium, Nouadhibou
15:30 UTC+0	Gaye 12'; Moustapha 63'	Report	Iajour 5', 44'; Hafidi 15'; Benhalib 69'	Attendance: 12,000; Referee: Sékou Ahmed Touré (Guinea)

==== Play-off round ====
7 April 2018	Zanaco (Zambia)	0–2	(Morocco) Raja CA	National Heroes Stadium, Lusaka
15:00 UTC+2		Report	Benhalib 67'; Hadraf 75'	Attendance: 8,000; Referee: Bamlak Tessema Weyesa (Ethiopia)

18 April 2018	Raja CA (Morocco)	3–0	(Zambia) Zanaco	Stade Mohammed V, Casablanca
20:00 UTC+1	Benhalib 15'; Iajour 18'; Banoun 78'	Report		Attendance: 21,000; Referee: Mustapha Ghorbal (Algeria)

==== Group stage ====
===== Group A =====
Pos	Team	Pld	W	D	L	GF	GA	GD	Pts	Qualification	RCA	VIT	ASE	ADU
1	(Morocco) Raja Casablanca	6	3	2	1	14	5	+9	11	Quarter-finals	—	0–0	4–0	6–0
2	(Democratic Republic of the Congo) AS Vita Club	6	3	1	2	8	5	+3	10	Quarter-finals	2–0	—	3–1	2–0
3	(Ivory Coast) ASEC Mimosas	6	3	0	3	6	8	−2	9		0–1	2–0	—	1–0
4	(Ghana) Aduana Stars	6	1	1	4	5	15	−10	4		3–3	2–1	0–2	—

Source: CAF

6 May 2018	Raja Casablanca (Morocco)	0–0	(Democratic Republic of the Congo) AS Vita Club	Stade Mohammed V, Casablanca
20:00 UTC+1		Report		Attendance: 14,000; Referee: Maguette N'Diaye (Senegal)

16 May 2018	Aduana Stars (Ghana)	3–3	(Morocco) Raja Casablanca	Agyeman Badu Stadium, Dormaa Ahenkro
13:00 UTC+0	Ulitch 20'; Amankwah 48'; Asamoah 90+4'	Report	Benhalib 10', 60'; Mabidi 39'	Attendance: 15,000; Referee: Jackson Pavaza (Namibia)

== Statistics ==
=== Squad statistics ===
Last updated on 2 November 2017.

No.	Pos	Nat	Player	Total		Botola		Coupe du Trône		CAF Cup 2018	
No.	Pos	Nat	Player	Apps	Goals	Apps	Goals	Apps	Goals	Apps	Goals
Goalkeepers
1	GK	(Morocco) MAR	Anas Zniti	18	0	9	0	9	0	0	0
22	GK	(Morocco) MAR	Mohamed Bouamira	1	0	1	0	0	0	0	0
55	GK	(Morocco) MAR	Aymane Chennouf	0	0	0	0	0	0	0	0
Defenders
2	DF	(Morocco) MAR	Omar Boutayeb	10	0	5	0	5	0	0	0
2	DF	(Morocco) MAR	Adil Karrouchy	5	0	1	0	4	0	0	0
3	DF	(Morocco) MAR	Hamza Toumi	5	0	3	0	2	0	0	0
4	DF	(Morocco) MAR	Badr Banoun	19	1	10	1	9	0	0	0
5	DF	(Morocco) MAR	Jaouad El Yamiq	16	2	8	1	8	1	0	0
24	DF	(Morocco) MAR	Abdeljalil Jbira	12	0	6	0	6	0	0	0
26	DF	(Morocco) MAR	Mohamed Khaldan	7	0	4	0	3	0	0	0
27	DF	(Morocco) MAR	Mohamed Oulhaj	11	0	5	0	6	0	0	0
Midfielders
99	MF	(Morocco) MAR	Issam Erraki	17	3	8	1	9	2	0	0
6	MF	(Democratic Republic of the Congo) COD	Lema Mabidi	16	0	7	0	9	0	0	0
10	MF	(Gabon) GAB	Samson Mbingui	1	0	1	0	0	0	0	0
18	MF	(Morocco) MAR	Abdelilah Hafidi	12	2	5	1	7	1	0	0
28	MF	(Morocco) MAR	Karim Nouamani	1	0	0	0	1	0	0	0
12	MF	(Morocco) MAR	Zakaria El Hilali	2	0	0	0	2	0	0	0
55	MF	(Morocco) MAR	Abderrahim Achchakir	17	3	9	3	8	0	0	0
98	MF	(Morocco) MAR	Walid Sebbar	6	0	3	0	3	0	0	0
2	MF	(Morocco) MAR	Aiman Douni	0	0	0	0	0	0	0	0
93	MF	(Morocco) MAR	Ayoub Sabiri	0	0	0	0	0	0	0	0
15	MF	(Morocco) MAR	Mohamed Douik	1	0	1	0	0	0	0	0
	MF	(Morocco) MAR	Mounir Obbadi	0	0	0	0	0	0	0	0
Forwards
7	FW	(Morocco) MAR	Zakaria Hadraf	18	2	9	0	9	2	0	0
11	FW	(Morocco) MAR	Zouhair El Ouassli	7	0	4	0	3	0	0	0
27	FW	(Morocco) MAR	Ayoub Joulal	3	1	2	0	1	1	0	0
19	FW	(Morocco) MAR	Mouhcine Iajour	18	9	9	4	9	5	0	0
93	FW	(Morocco) MAR	Abdelkabir El Ouadi	4	1	4	1	0	0	0	0
26	FW	(Morocco) MAR	Mahmoud Benhalib	15	4	6	2	9	2	0	0
77	FW	(Morocco) MAR	Hilaire Momi	5	0	3	0	2	0	0	0

=== Goalscorers ===
No.	Pos.	Name	Botola	Coupe du Trône	Confederation Cup	Total
12	FW	(Morocco) Mouhcine Iajour	17	5	3	25
24	FW	(Morocco) Mahmoud Benhalib	5	2	5	12
13	DF	(Morocco) Badr Benoun	5	0	1	6
7	FW	(Morocco) Zakaria Hadraf	1	3	1	5
18	MF	(Morocco) Abdelilah Hafidi	2	1	1	4
99	MF	(Morocco) Issam Erraki	1	2	0	3
55	MF	(Morocco) Abderrahim Achchakir	3	0	0	3
5	DF	(Morocco) Jaouad El Yamiq	2	1	0	3
14	MF	(Democratic Republic of the Congo) Lema Mabidi	2	0	1	3
26	DF	(Morocco) Mohamed Khaldan	1	1	1	2
93	FW	(Morocco) Abdelkabir El Ouadi	2	0	0	2
30	FW	(Morocco) Abdeladim Khadrouf	1	0	0	1
27	FW	(Morocco) Ayoub Joulal	0	1	0	1
Own goals			3	0	0	3
TOTAL			45	15	13	73
