= 2018 CAF Confederation Cup group stage =

- Dates: 6 May – 29 August 2018

Tournament statistics
- Matches played: 48
- Goals scored: 106 (2.21 per match)

The 2018 CAF Confederation Cup group stage was played from 6 May to 29 August 2018. A total of 16 teams competed in the group stage to decide the eight places in the knockout stage of the 2018 CAF Confederation Cup.

== Draw ==
The draw for the group stage was held on 21 April 2018, 14:00 EET (UTC+2), at the CAF headquarters in Cairo, Egypt. The 16 teams, all winners of the play-off round of qualifying, were drawn into four groups of four. The teams were seeded by their performances in the CAF competitions for the previous five seasons (CAF 5-year ranking points shown in parentheses). Each group contained one team from Pot 1 and three teams from Pot 2, and each team was drawn into one of the positions in their group.

Pot	Pot 1	Pot 2
Teams	(Algeria) USM Alger (35 pts); (Sudan) Al-Hilal (21 pts); (Democratic Republic of the Congo) AS Vita Club (15 pts); (Nigeria) Enyimba (8 pts)	(Ivory Coast) ASEC Mimosas (5 pts); (Tanzania) Young Africans (2 pts); (Republic of the Congo) CARA Brazzaville; (Ivory Coast) Williamsville AC; (Egypt) Al-Masry; (Ghana) Aduana Stars; (Kenya) Gor Mahia; (Mali) Djoliba; (Morocco) Raja Casablanca; (Morocco) RS Berkane; (Mozambique) UD Songo; (Rwanda) Rayon Sports

== Format ==
In the group stage, each group was played on a home-and-away round-robin basis. The winners and runners-up of each group advanced to the quarter-finals of the knockout stage.

=== Tiebreakers ===
The teams were ranked according to points (3 points for a win, 1 point for a draw, 0 points for a loss). If tied on points, tiebreakers were applied in the following order (Regulations III. 20 & 21):

1. Points in head-to-head matches among tied teams;
2. Goal difference in head-to-head matches among tied teams;
3. Goals scored in head-to-head matches among tied teams;
4. Away goals scored in head-to-head matches among tied teams;
5. If more than two teams are tied, and after applying all head-to-head criteria above, a subset of teams are still tied, all head-to-head criteria above are reapplied exclusively to this subset of teams;
6. Goal difference in all group matches;
7. Goals scored in all group matches;
8. Away goals scored in all group matches;
9. Drawing of lots.

== Schedule ==
The schedule of each matchday was as follows (matches scheduled in midweek in italics). Effective from the Confederation Cup group stage, weekend matches were played on Sundays while midweek matches were played on Wednesdays, with some exceptions. Kick-off times were also fixed at 13:00, 16:00 and 19:00 GMT.

Matchday	Dates	Matches
Matchday 1	6 May 2018	Team 1 vs. Team 4, Team 2 vs. Team 3
Matchday 2	16 May 2018	Team 3 vs. Team 1, Team 4 vs. Team 2
Matchday 3	18 July 2018	Team 4 vs. Team 3, Team 1 vs. Team 2
Matchday 4	29 July 2018	Team 3 vs. Team 4, Team 2 vs. Team 1
Matchday 5	19 August 2018	Team 4 vs. Team 1, Team 3 vs. Team 2
Matchday 6	29 August 2018	Team 1 vs. Team 3, Team 2 vs. Team 4

== Groups ==
=== Group A ===
Pos	Team	Pld	W	D	L	GF	GA	GD	Pts	Qualification	RCA	VIT	ASE	ADU
1	(Morocco) Raja Casablanca	6	3	2	1	14	5	+9	11	Quarter-finals	—	0–0	4–0	6–0
2	(Democratic Republic of the Congo) AS Vita Club	6	3	1	2	8	5	+3	10	Quarter-finals	2–0	—	3–1	2–0
3	(Ivory Coast) ASEC Mimosas	6	3	0	3	6	8	−2	9		0–1	2–0	—	1–0
4	(Ghana) Aduana Stars	6	1	1	4	5	15	−10	4		3–3	2–1	0–2	—

Source: CAF
Rules for classification: Group stage tiebreakers
6 May 2018
16:00 UTC+0

ASEC Mimosas (Ivory Coast)	1–0	(Ghana) Aduana Stars
Touré 39'	Report

Stade Félix Houphouët-Boigny, Abidjan
Referee: Norman Matemera (Zimbabwe)
6 May 2018
20:00 UTC+1

Raja Casablanca (Morocco)	0–0	(Democratic Republic of the Congo) AS Vita Club
	Report

Stade Mohammed V, Casablanca
Attendance: 14,000
Referee: Maguette N'Diaye (Senegal)

16 May 2018
14:00 UTC+1

AS Vita Club (Democratic Republic of the Congo)	3–1	(Ivory Coast) ASEC Mimosas
Ngudikama 48', 58'; Muzinga 71'	Report	Badie 20' (pen.)

Stade des Martyrs, Kinshasa
Referee: Youssef Essrayri (Tunisia)
16 May 2018
13:00 UTC+0

Aduana Stars (Ghana)	3–3	(Morocco) Raja Casablanca
Ulitch 20'; Amankwah 48'; Asamoah 90+4'	Report	Benhalib 10', 60'; Mabidi 39'

Agyeman Badu Stadium, Dormaa Ahenkro
Attendance: 15,000
Referee: Jackson Pavaza (Namibia)

18 July 2018
13:00 UTC+0

Aduana Stars (Ghana)	2–1	(Democratic Republic of the Congo) AS Vita Club
Adjei 3'; Mohammed 10'	Report	Muzinga 26'

Agyeman Badu Stadium, Dormaa Ahenkro
Referee: Mehdi Abid Charef (Algeria)
18 July 2018
16:00 UTC+0

ASEC Mimosas (Ivory Coast)	0–1	(Morocco) Raja Casablanca
	Report	Benhalib 74' (pen.)

Stade Félix Houphouët-Boigny, Abidjan
Attendance: 8,000
Referee: Mohamed Maarouf (Egypt)

29 July 2018
14:00 UTC+1

AS Vita Club (Democratic Republic of the Congo)	2–0	(Ghana) Aduana Stars
Mundele 14', 78'	Report

Stade des Martyrs, Kinshasa
Referee: Souleiman Ahmed Djama (Djibouti)
29 July 2018
20:00 UTC+1

Raja Casablanca (Morocco)	4–0	(Ivory Coast) ASEC Mimosas
Benhalib 18', 62' (pen.); Hadraf 27', 45+1'	Report

Stade Mohammed V, Casablanca
Attendance: 32 000
Referee: Sékou Ahmed Touré (Guinea)

19 August 2018
13:00 UTC+0

Aduana Stars (Ghana)	0–2	(Ivory Coast) ASEC Mimosas
	Report	Badie 24' (pen.); Ta Bi 35'

Agyeman Badu Stadium, Dormaa Ahenkro
Referee: Joshua Bondo (Botswana)
19 August 2018
14:00 UTC+1

AS Vita Club (Democratic Republic of the Congo)	2–0	(Morocco) Raja Casablanca
Ngoma 50'; Mundele 59'	Report

Stade des Martyrs, Kinshasa
Referee: Hassan Mohamed Hagi (Somalia)

29 August 2018
19:00 UTC+0

ASEC Mimosas (Ivory Coast)	2–0	(Democratic Republic of the Congo) AS Vita Club
Ta Bi 14'; Sanogo 26'	Report

Stade Félix Houphouët-Boigny, Abidjan
Referee: Mustapha Ghorbal (Algeria)
29 August 2018
20:00 UTC+1

Raja Casablanca (Morocco)	6–0	(Ghana) Aduana Stars
Iajour 3', 15'; Hadraf 30'; Rahimi 33'; Benhalib 67', 82'	Report

Stade Mohammed V, Casablanca
Referee: Juste Ephrem Zio (Burkina Faso)

=== Group B ===
Pos	Team	Pld	W	D	L	GF	GA	GD	Pts	Qualification	RSB	MAS	SON	HIL
1	(Morocco) RS Berkane	6	4	1	1	7	2	+5	13	Quarter-finals	—	0–0	2–1	1–0
2	(Egypt) Al-Masry	6	3	3	0	7	2	+5	12	Quarter-finals	1–0	—	2–0	2–0
3	(Mozambique) UD Songo	6	0	3	3	5	10	−5	3 (Note: Head-to-head results: Al-Hilal 2–2 UD Songo, UD Songo 1–1 Al-Hilal (UD Songo won on away goals).)		0–2	1–1	—	1–1
4	(Sudan) Al-Hilal	6	0	3	3	4	9	−5	3		0–2	1–1	2–2	—

Source: CAF
Rules for classification: Group stage tiebreakers
Notes:
6 May 2018
17:00 UTC+1

RS Berkane (Morocco)	1–0	(Sudan) Al-Hilal
Laba 2'	Report

Stade Municipal de Berkane, Berkane
Referee: Denis Dembélé (Ivory Coast)
6 May 2018
21:00 UTC+2

Al-Masry (Egypt)	2–0	(Mozambique) UD Songo
Gomaa 35', 52'	Report

Al-Masry Club Stadium, Port Said
Attendance: 11,000
Referee: Jean-Jacques Ndala Ngambo (DR Congo)

16 May 2018
15:00 UTC+2

UD Songo (Mozambique)	0–2	(Morocco) RS Berkane
	Report	El Kaabi 64', 89'

Estádio do Ferroviário, Beira
Referee: Pacifique Ndabihawenimana (Burundi)
16 May 2018
21:00 UTC+2

Al-Hilal (Sudan)	1–1	(Egypt) Al-Masry
Maranhão 80' (pen.)	Report	Issa 10'

Al-Hilal Stadium, Omdurman
Referee: Mustapha Ghorbal (Algeria)

18 July 2018
21:00 UTC+2

Al-Hilal (Sudan)	2–2	(Mozambique) UD Songo
Bashir 2'; Ulimwengu 36'	Report	Banda 43'; Pelembe 87'

Al-Hilal Stadium, Omdurman
Referee: Jackson Pavaza (Namibia)
18 July 2018
20:00 UTC+1

RS Berkane (Morocco)	0–0	(Egypt) Al-Masry
	Report

Stade Municipal de Berkane, Berkane
Referee: Eric Otogo-Castane (Gabon)

29 July 2018
15:00 UTC+2

UD Songo (Mozambique)	1–1	(Sudan) Al-Hilal
Mário 5'	Report	Shiboub 53'

Estádio do Ferroviário, Beira
Referee: Jean Claude Ishimwe (Rwanda)
29 July 2018
21:00 UTC+2

Al-Masry (Egypt)	1–0	(Morocco) RS Berkane
Issa 54'	Report

Al-Masry Club Stadium, Port Said
Referee: Sadok Selmi (Tunisia)

19 August 2018
15:00 UTC+2

UD Songo (Mozambique)	1–1	(Egypt) Al-Masry
Ukonde 82'	Report	Grendo 77'

Estádio do Ferroviário, Beira
Referee: Mahamadou Keita (Mali)
19 August 2018
21:00 UTC+2

Al-Hilal (Sudan)	0–2	(Morocco) RS Berkane
	Report	Laba 40'; Traoré 64'

Al-Hilal Stadium, Omdurman
Referee: Sidi Alioum (Cameroon)

29 August 2018
20:00 UTC+1

RS Berkane (Morocco)	2–1	(Mozambique) UD Songo
Traoré 6'; Farehane 70'	Report	Ukonde 47'

Stade Municipal de Berkane, Berkane
Referee: Ali Lemghaifry (Mauritania)
29 August 2018
21:00 UTC+2

Al-Masry (Egypt)	2–0	(Sudan) Al-Hilal
Grendo 20'; Marcelo 67'	Report

Al-Masry Club Stadium, Port Said
Referee: Youssef Essrayri (Tunisia)

=== Group C ===
Pos	Team	Pld	W	D	L	GF	GA	GD	Pts	Qualification	ENY	CAR	WAC	DJO
1	(Nigeria) Enyimba	6	4	0	2	5	5	0	12	Quarter-finals	—	1–0	1–0	2–0
2	(Republic of the Congo) CARA Brazzaville	6	3	0	3	7	5	+2	9	Quarter-finals	3–0	—	3–1	1–0
3	(Ivory Coast) Williamsville AC	6	2	2	2	5	5	0	8		2–0	1–0	—	0–0
4	(Mali) Djoliba	6	1	2	3	3	5	−2	5		0–1	2–0	1–1	—

Source: CAF
Rules for classification: Group stage tiebreakers
6 May 2018
17:00 UTC+1

Enyimba (Nigeria)	2–0	(Mali) Djoliba
Oladuntoye 48'; Dimgba 81' (pen.)	Report

U. J. Esuene Stadium, Calabar
Referee: Noureddine El Jaafari (Morocco)
6 May 2018
19:00 UTC+0

Williamsville AC (Ivory Coast)	1–0	(Republic of the Congo) CARA Brazzaville
Zan Bi 18'	Report

Stade Félix Houphouët-Boigny, Abidjan
Referee: Ali Lemghaifry (Mauritania)

16 May 2018
14:00 UTC+1

CARA Brazzaville (Republic of the Congo)	3–0	(Nigeria) Enyimba
Louamba 14'; Kivutuka 17'; Liema 18'	Report

Stade Alphonse Massemba-Débat, Brazzaville
Referee: Hassan Mohamed Hagi (Somalia)
16 May 2018
19:00 UTC+0

Djoliba (Mali)	1–1	(Ivory Coast) Williamsville AC
Niapégué 58'	Report	J.-F. N'da 76'

Stade Modibo Kéïta, Bamako
Referee: Sékou Ahmed Touré (Guinea)

18 July 2018
14:00 UTC+1

Enyimba (Nigeria)	1–0	(Ivory Coast) Williamsville AC
Mustapha 7'	Report

Adokiye Amiesimaka Stadium, Port Harcourt
Referee: Norman Matemera (Zimbabwe)
18 July 2018
19:00 UTC+0

Djoliba (Mali)	2–0	(Republic of the Congo) CARA Brazzaville
Cissé 45+2'; Coulibaly 54'	Report

Stade Modibo Kéïta, Bamako
Referee: Pacifique Ndabihawenimana (Burundi)

29 July 2018
14:00 UTC+1

CARA Brazzaville (Republic of the Congo)	1–0	(Mali) Djoliba
Louamba 14'	Report

Stade Alphonse Massemba-Débat, Brazzaville
Referee: Mashood Ssali (Uganda)
29 July 2018
16:00 UTC+0

Williamsville AC (Ivory Coast)	2–0	(Nigeria) Enyimba
J.-W. N'da 31'; Yameogo 77'	Report

Stade Robert Champroux, Abidjan
Referee: Rédouane Jiyed (Morocco)

19 August 2018
14:00 UTC+1

CARA Brazzaville (Republic of the Congo)	3–1	(Ivory Coast) Williamsville AC
Kinfounia 15'; Kivutuka 52'; Mbo 87'	Report	Karidioula 72'

Stade Alphonse Massemba-Débat, Brazzaville
Referee: Louis Hakizimana (Rwanda)
19 August 2018
19:00 UTC+0

Djoliba (Mali)	0–1	(Nigeria) Enyimba
	Report	Mohammed 90+1' (pen.)

Stade Modibo Kéïta, Bamako
Referee: Ibrahim Nour El Din (Egypt)

29 August 2018
17:00 UTC+1

Enyimba (Nigeria)	1–0	(Republic of the Congo) CARA Brazzaville
Alalade 90+4'	Report

Enyimba International Stadium, Aba
Referee: Souleiman Ahmed Djama (Djibouti)
29 August 2018
16:00 UTC+0

Williamsville AC (Ivory Coast)	0–0	(Mali) Djoliba
	Report

Stade Félix Houphouët-Boigny, Abidjan
Referee: Kokou Ognankotan Ntale (Togo)

=== Group D ===
Pos	Team	Pld	W	D	L	GF	GA	GD	Pts	Qualification	USM	RAY	GOR	YAN
1	(Algeria) USM Alger	6	3	2	1	10	5	+5	11	Quarter-finals	—	1–1	2–1	4–0
2	(Rwanda) Rayon Sports	6	2	3	1	6	5	+1	9	Quarter-finals	1–2	—	1–1	1–0
3	(Kenya) Gor Mahia	6	2	2	2	10	7	+3	8		0–0	1–2	—	4–0
4	(Tanzania) Young Africans	6	1	1	4	4	13	−9	4		2–1	0–0	2–3	—

Source: CAF
Rules for classification: Group stage tiebreakers
6 May 2018
18:00 UTC+2

Rayon Sports (Rwanda)	1–1	(Kenya) Gor Mahia
Rutanga 24'	Report	Kagere 11'

Stade Régional Nyamirambo, Kigali
Referee: Amin Mohamed Omar (Egypt)
6 May 2018
20:00 UTC+1

USM Alger (Algeria)	4–0	(Tanzania) Young Africans
Darfalou 4'; Chafaï 32'; Meziane 53'; Zemmamouche 90+2' (pen.)	Report

Stade du 5-Juillet-1962, Algiers
Referee: Daniel Laryea (Ghana)

16 May 2018
19:00 UTC+3

Young Africans (Tanzania)	0–0	(Rwanda) Rayon Sports
	Report

National Stadium, Dar es Salaam
Referee: Hélder Martins de Carvalho (Angola)
16 May 2018
19:00 UTC+3

Gor Mahia (Kenya)	0–0	(Algeria) USM Alger
	Report

Moi International Sports Centre, Nairobi
Referee: Mahamadou Keita (Mali)

18 July 2018
19:00 UTC+3

Gor Mahia (Kenya)	4–0	(Tanzania) Young Africans
Tuyisenge 22'; Guikan 45+1', 86'; Mwinyi 65' (o.g.)	Report

Moi International Sports Centre, Nairobi
Referee: Hassan Mohamed Hagi (Somalia)
18 July 2018
18:00 UTC+2

Rayon Sports (Rwanda)	1–2	(Algeria) USM Alger
Diarra 38'	Report	Chafaï 45+2'; Benguit 90+3'

Stade Régional Nyamirambo, Kigali
Referee: Sidi Alioum (Cameroon)

29 July 2018
19:00 UTC+3

Young Africans (Tanzania)	2–3	(Kenya) Gor Mahia
Kaseke 59'; Loth 81'	Report	Odhiambo 1'; Tuyisenge 41'; Shakava 64'

National Stadium, Dar es Salaam
Referee: Ahmad Imtehaz Heeralall (Mauritius)
29 July 2018
20:00 UTC+1

USM Alger (Algeria)	1–1	(Rwanda) Rayon Sports
Hamia 86'	Report	Diarra 28'

Mustapha Tchaker Stadium, Blida (Note: USM Alger played their home match against Rayon Sports at Mustapha Tchaker Stadium, Blida, instead of their regular stadium July 5, 1962 Stadium, Algiers, as it was used for athletics at the 2018 African Youth Games.)
Referee: Juste Ephrem Zio (Burkina Faso)

19 August 2018
19:00 UTC+3

Gor Mahia (Kenya)	1–2	(Rwanda) Rayon Sports
Mustapha 22'	Report	Bimenyimana 3'; Rutanga 53'

Moi International Sports Centre, Nairobi
Referee: Norman Matemera (Zimbabwe)
19 August 2018
19:00 UTC+3

Young Africans (Tanzania)	2–1	(Algeria) USM Alger
Kaseke 44'; Makambo 47'	Report	Meziane 52'

National Stadium, Dar es Salaam
Referee: Jackson Pavaza (Namibia)

29 August 2018
15:00 UTC+2

Rayon Sports (Rwanda)	1–0	(Tanzania) Young Africans
Bimenyimana 19'	Report

Stade Régional Nyamirambo, Kigali
Referee: Mashood Ssali (Uganda)
29 August 2018
14:00 UTC+1

USM Alger (Algeria)	2–1	(Kenya) Gor Mahia
Ibara 36'; Sayoud 81'	Report	Tuyisenge 83'

Stade du 5-Juillet-1962, Algiers
Referee: Bienvenu Sinko (Ivory Coast)
