= 2018 CAF Confederation Cup final =

- Event: 2018 CAF Confederation Cup
Raja CA	AS Vita Club
(Morocco)	(Democratic Republic of the Congo)
4	3

First leg
Raja CA	AS Vita Club
3	0
- Date: 25 November 2018
- Venue: Stade Mohammed V, Casablanca
- Referee: Maguette N'Diaye (Senegal)
- Attendance: 45,000

Second leg
AS Vita Club	Raja CA
3	1
- Date: 2 December 2018
- Venue: Stade des Martyrs, Kinshasa
- Referee: Victor Gomes (South Africa)
- Attendance: 75,000

The 2018 CAF Confederation Cup final was the final of the 2018 CAF Confederation Cup, the 27th edition of Africa's secondary club football tournament organized by the Confederation of African Football (CAF), and the 15th edition under the current CAF Confederation Cup title.

The final was contested in two-legged home-and-away format between Raja CA from Morocco and AS Vita Club from the Democratic Republic of the Congo. The first leg was hosted by Raja CA at the Stade Mohammed V in Casablanca on 25 November 2018, while the second leg was hosted by AS Vita Club at the Stade des Martyrs in Kinshasa on 2 December 2018.

Raja CA won the final 4–3 on aggregate for their second CAF Confederation Cup title. As winners, they earned the right to play in the 2019 CAF Super Cup against the winner of the 2018 CAF Champions League.

== Teams ==
Team	Zone	Previous finals appearances (bold indicates winners)
(Morocco) Raja CA	UNAF (North Africa)	None
(Democratic Republic of the Congo) AS Vita Club	UNIFFAC (Central Africa)	None

== Venues ==
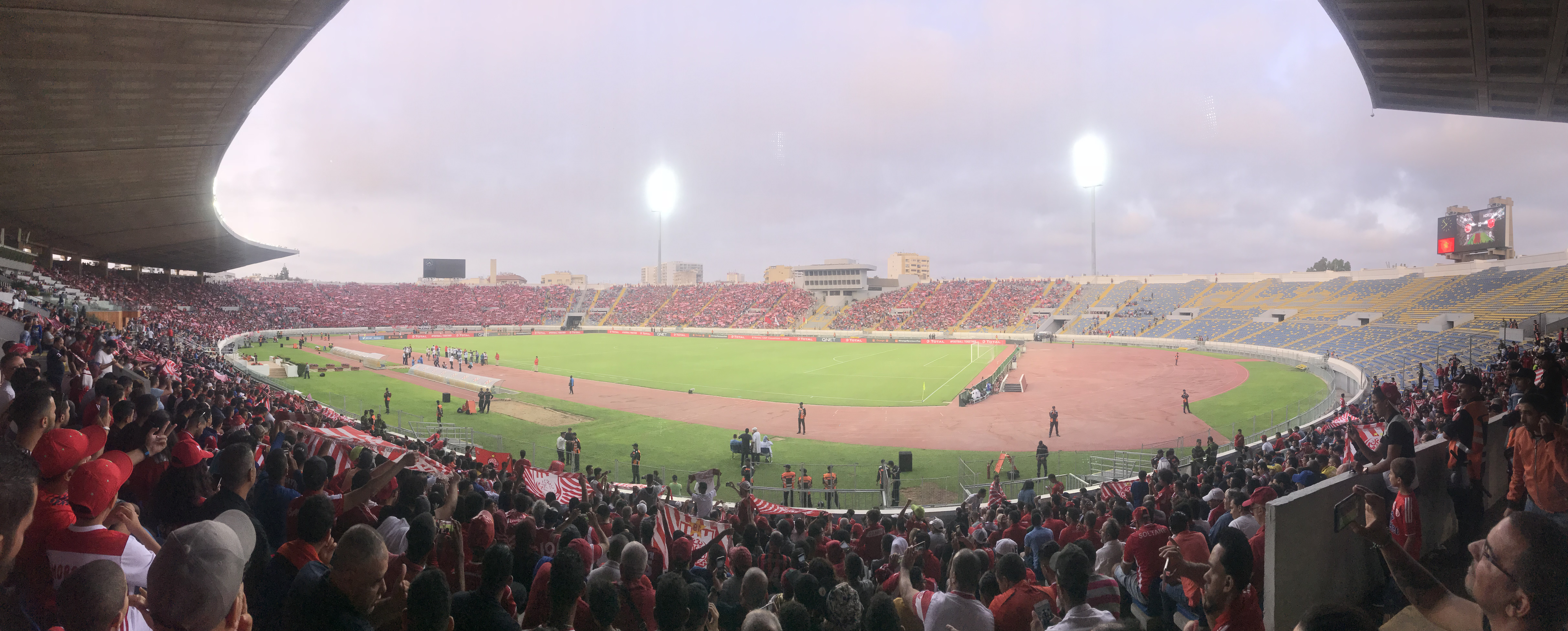
Stade Mohammed V in Casablanca, Morocco hosted the first leg.

Stade des Martyrs in Kinshasa, Democratic Republic of the Congo, hosted the second leg.

== Road to the final ==
Note: In all results below, the score of the finalist is given first (H: home; A: away).

(Morocco) Raja CA				Round	(Democratic Republic of the Congo) AS Vita Club			
**Confederation Cup**					**Champions League**			
Opponent	Agg.	1st leg	2nd leg	Qualifying rounds (CC, CL)	Opponent	Agg.	1st leg	2nd leg
Bye				Preliminary round	(Malawi) Mighty Wanderers	6–1	4–0 (H)	2–1 (A)
(Mauritania) FC Nouadhibou	5–3	1–1 (H)	4–2 (A)	First round	(Morocco) Difaâ El Jadidi	2–3	0–1 (A)	2–2 (H)
					**Confederation Cup**			
(Zambia) Zanaco	5–0	2–0 (A)	3–0 (H)	Play-off round	(Republic of the Congo) CS La Mancha	6–1	1–0 (H)	5–1 (A)
Opponent	Result			Group stage	Opponent	Result		
(Democratic Republic of the Congo) AS Vita Club	0–0 (H)			Matchday 1	(Morocco) Raja CA	0–0 (A)		
(Ghana) Aduana Stars	3–3 (A)			Matchday 2	(Ivory Coast) ASEC Mimosas	3–1 (H)		
(Ivory Coast) ASEC Mimosas	1–0 (A)			Matchday 3	(Ghana) Aduana Stars	1–2 (A)		
(Ivory Coast) ASEC Mimosas	4–0 (H)			Matchday 4	(Ghana) Aduana Stars	2–0 (H)		
(Democratic Republic of the Congo) AS Vita Club	0–2 (A)			Matchday 5	(Morocco) Raja CA	2–0 (H)		
(Ghana) Aduana Stars	6–0 (H)			Matchday 6	(Ivory Coast) ASEC Mimosas	0–2 (A)		
**Group A winners**: Pos / Team / Pld / Pts; **1** / (Morocco) Raja Casablanca / **6** / **11**; 2 / (Democratic Republic of the Congo) AS Vita Club / 6 / **10**; 3 / (Ivory Coast) ASEC Mimosas / 6 / **9**; 4 / (Ghana) Aduana Stars / 6 / **4**; Source: CAF				Final standings	**Group A runners-up**: Pos / Team / Pld / Pts; 1 / (Morocco) Raja Casablanca / 6 / **11**; **2** / (Democratic Republic of the Congo) AS Vita Club / **6** / **10**; 3 / (Ivory Coast) ASEC Mimosas / 6 / **9**; 4 / (Ghana) Aduana Stars / 6 / **4**; Source: CAF			
Opponent	Agg.	1st leg	2nd leg	Knockout stage	Opponent	Agg.	1st leg	2nd leg
(Republic of the Congo) CARA Brazzaville	3–1	2–1 (A)	1–0 (H)	Quarter-finals	(Morocco) RS Berkane	4–2	3–1 (H)	1–1 (A)
(Nigeria) Enyimba	3–1	1–0 (A)	2–1 (H)	Semi-finals	(Egypt) Al-Masry	4–0	0–0 (A)	4–0 (H)

== Format ==
The final was played on a home-and-away two-legged basis, with the order of legs determined by the knockout stage draw, which was held on 3 September 2018, 19:00 EET (UTC+2), at the CAF headquarters in Cairo, Egypt.

If the aggregate score was tied after the second leg, the away goals rule would be applied, and if still tied, extra time would not be played, and the penalty shoot-out would be used to determine the winner.

== Matches ==
=== First leg ===
25 November 2018
20:00 UTC+1

Raja CA (Morocco)	3–0	(Democratic Republic of the Congo) AS Vita Club
Rahimi 47', 61'; Benhalib 66' (pen.)	Report

Stade Mohammed V, Casablanca
Attendance: 45,000
Referee: Maguette N'Diaye (Senegal)

**Raja CA**	**AS Vita Club**

GK	1	(Morocco) Anas Zniti
RB	2	(Morocco) Abderrahim Achchakir
CB	13	(Morocco) Badr Banoun (c)		(substituted off) 90+2'
CB	4	(Libya) Sanad Al Ouarfali
LB	25	(Morocco) Omar Boutayeb
CM	19	(Senegal) Ibrahima Niasse
CM	14	(Democratic Republic of the Congo) Lema Mabidi		(substituted off) 84'
RW	24	(Morocco) Mahmoud Benhalib
AM	18	(Morocco) Abdelilah Hafidi
LW	7	(Morocco) Zakaria Hadraf
CF	21	(Morocco) Soufiane Rahimi	(yellow card) 44'	(substituted off) 76'
Substitutes:
GK	22	(Morocco) Mohamed Bouamira
DF	6	(Morocco) Saad Lakohal		(substituted on) 90+2'
DF	16	(Morocco) Mohamed Oulhaj
MF	8	(Morocco) Mohamed Douik		(substituted on) 84'
MF	23	(Morocco) Salaheddine Bahi
FW	9	(Morocco) Mouhcine Iajour		(substituted on) 76'
FW	11	(Morocco) Anas Jabroun
Manager:
(Spain) Juan Carlos Garrido

GK	16	(Cameroon) Nelson Lukong
RB	3	(Democratic Republic of the Congo) Djuma Shabani
CB	26	(Democratic Republic of the Congo) Makwekwe Kupa
CB	4	(Democratic Republic of the Congo) Yannick Bangala Litombo	(yellow card) 25' (yellow-red card) 64'
LB	14	(Democratic Republic of the Congo) Ngonda Muzinga	(yellow card) 57'
CM	22	(Democratic Republic of the Congo) Mukoko Tonombe	(yellow card) 32'
CM	6	(Democratic Republic of the Congo) Nelson Munganga (c)
RW	11	(Democratic Republic of the Congo) Chadrack Lukombe		(substituted off) 73'
AM	8	(Democratic Republic of the Congo) Fabrice Luamba Ngoma
LW	7	(Democratic Republic of the Congo) Mukoko Batezadio
CF	29	(Democratic Republic of the Congo) Jean-Marc Makusu Mundele		(substituted off) 24'
Substitutes:
GK	23	(Democratic Republic of the Congo) Hervé Lomboto
DF	12	(Democratic Republic of the Congo) Dharles Kalonji
DF	13	(Democratic Republic of the Congo) Ernest Luzolo Sita
DF	15	(Democratic Republic of the Congo) Botuli Bompunga		(substituted on) 73'
MF	2	(Democratic Republic of the Congo) Emmanuel Ngudikama
MF	5	(Democratic Republic of the Congo) Emomo Eddy Ngoyi		(substituted on) 24'
FW	21	(Democratic Republic of the Congo) Ducapel Moloko
Manager:
(Democratic Republic of the Congo) Florent Ibengé

Assistant referees:
Djibril Camara (Senegal)
El Hadji Samba (Senegal)
Fourth official:
Issa Sy (Senegal)

**Match rules**

- 90 minutes.
- Seven named substitutes, of which up to three may be used.

=== Second leg ===
2 December 2018
20:00 UTC+1

AS Vita Club (Democratic Republic of the Congo)	3–1	(Morocco) Raja CA
Mundele 45+4'; Batezadio 71'; Ngoma 74'	Report	Hafidi 21'

Stade des Martyrs, Kinshasa
Attendance: 75,000
Referee: Victor Gomes (South Africa)

**AS Vita Club**	**Raja CA**

Assistant referees:
Zakhele Siwela (South Africa)
Johannes Moshidi (South Africa)
Fourth official:
Joshua Bondo (Botswana)

**Match rules**

- 90 minutes.
- Penalty shoot-out if tied on aggregate and away goals.
- Seven named substitutes, of which up to three may be used.

== See also ==
- 2018 CAF Champions League Final
- 2019 CAF Super Cup
