= 2018 CAF Confederation Cup knockout stage =

The 2018 CAF Confederation Cup knockout stage was played from 16 September to 2 December 2018. A total of eight teams competed in the knockout stage to decide the champions of the 2018 CAF Confederation Cup.

== Qualified teams ==
The winners and runners-up of each of the four groups in the group stage advanced to the quarter-finals.

Group	Winners	Runners-up
A	(Morocco) Raja Casablanca	(Democratic Republic of the Congo) AS Vita Club
B	(Morocco) RS Berkane	(Egypt) Al-Masry
C	(Nigeria) Enyimba	(Republic of the Congo) CARA Brazzaville
D	(Algeria) USM Alger	(Rwanda) Rayon Sports

== Format ==
In the knockout stage, the eight teams played a single-elimination tournament. Each tie was played on a home-and-away two-legged basis. If the aggregate score was tied after the second leg, the away goals rule would be applied, and if still tied, extra time would not be played, and the penalty shoot-out would be used to determine the winner (Regulations III. 26 & 27).

== Schedule ==
The schedule of each round was as follows (matches scheduled in midweek in italics). Effective from the Confederation Cup group stage, weekend matches were played on Sundays while midweek matches were played on Wednesdays, with some exceptions. Kick-off times were also fixed at 13:00, 16:00 and 19:00 GMT.

Round	First leg	Second leg
Quarter-finals	16 September 2018	23 September 2018
Semi-finals	3 October 2018	24 October 2018
Final	25 November 2018	2 December 2018

== Bracket ==
The bracket of the knockout stage was determined as follows:

Round	Matchups
Quarter-finals	(Group winners host second leg, matchups decided by draw, teams from same group cannot play each other): QF1; QF2; QF3; QF4
Semi-finals	(Matchups and order of legs decided by draw, between winners QF1, QF2, QF3, QF4): SF1; SF2
Final	(Winners SF1 host first leg, Winners SF2 host second leg): Winner SF1 vs. Winner SF2

The bracket was decided after the draw for the knockout stage (quarter-finals and semi-finals), which was held on 3 September 2018, 19:00 EET (UTC+2), at the CAF headquarters in Cairo, Egypt.

Quarter-finals
(Rwanda) Rayon Sports	0	1	1
(Nigeria) Enyimba	0	5	5
(Republic of the Congo) CARA Brazzaville	1	0	1
(Morocco) Raja Casablanca	2	1	3
(Egypt) Al-Masry	1	1	2
(Algeria) USM Alger	0	0	0
(Democratic Republic of the Congo) AS Vita Club	3	1	4
(Morocco) RS Berkane	1	1	2

Semi-finals
(Nigeria) Enyimba	0	1	1
(Morocco) Raja Casablanca	1	2	3
(Egypt) Al-Masry	0	0	0
(Democratic Republic of the Congo) AS Vita Club	0	4	4

Final
(Morocco) Raja Casablanca	3	1	4
(Democratic Republic of the Congo) AS Vita Club	0	3	3

== Quarter-finals ==
In the quarter-finals, the winners of one group played the runners-up of another group (teams from same group could not play each other), with the group winners hosting the second leg, and the matchups decided by draw.

Team 1	Agg.	Team 2	1st leg	2nd leg
Rayon Sports (Rwanda)	1–5	(Nigeria) Enyimba	0–0	1–5
CARA Brazzaville (Republic of the Congo)	1–3	(Morocco) Raja Casablanca	1–2	0–1
Al-Masry (Egypt)	2–0	(Algeria) USM Alger	1–0	1–0
AS Vita Club (Democratic Republic of the Congo)	4–2	(Morocco) RS Berkane	3–1	1–1

16 September 2018
15:00 UTC+2

Rayon Sports (Rwanda)	0–0	(Nigeria) Enyimba
	Report

Stade Régional Nyamirambo, Kigali
Referee: Mustapha Ghorbal (Algeria)
23 September 2018
14:00 UTC+1

Enyimba (Nigeria)	5–1	(Rwanda) Rayon Sports
Dimgba 12'; Udo 29'; Adetunji 48'; Osadiaye 60'; Oladuntoye 80'	Report	Bimenyimana 25'

Enyimba International Stadium, Aba
Referee: Gehad Grisha (Egypt)

Enyimba won 5–1 on aggregate.

16 September 2018
14:00 UTC+1

CARA Brazzaville (Republic of the Congo)	1–2	(Morocco) Raja Casablanca
Kivutuka 71'	Report	Rahimi 47'; Benhalib 80'

Stade Alphonse Massemba-Débat, Brazzaville
Referee: Davies Omweno (Kenya)
23 September 2018
17:00 UTC+1

Raja Casablanca (Morocco)	1–0	(Republic of the Congo) CARA Brazzaville
Iajour 4'	Report

Stade Mohammed V, Casablanca
Attendance: 55,000
Referee: Jean-Jacques Ndala Ngambo (DR Congo)

Raja Casablanca won 3–1 on aggregate.

16 September 2018
21:00 UTC+2

Al-Masry (Egypt)	1–0	(Algeria) USM Alger
Wadi 54'	Report

Al-Masry Club Stadium, Port Said
Attendance: 15,000
Referee: Maguette N'Diaye (Senegal)
23 September 2018
20:00 UTC+1

USM Alger (Algeria)	0–1	(Egypt) Al-Masry
	Report	Wadi 34'

Stade 8 Mai 1945, Sétif (Note: USM Alger played their home match against Al-Masry at Stade 8 Mai 1945, Sétif, instead of their regular stadium July 5, 1962 Stadium, Algiers, due to renovation.)
Attendance: 23,000
Referee: Joshua Bondo (Botswana)

Al-Masry won 2–0 on aggregate.

16 September 2018
17:00 UTC+1

AS Vita Club (Democratic Republic of the Congo)	3–1	(Morocco) RS Berkane
Mundele 44', 57'; Shabani 78'	Report	Aziz 24'

Stade des Martyrs, Kinshasa
Referee: Mahamadou Keita (Mali)
23 September 2018
20:00 UTC+1

RS Berkane (Morocco)	1–1	(Democratic Republic of the Congo) AS Vita Club
Traoré 6'	Report	Ngoma 87'

Stade Municipal de Berkane, Berkane
Referee: Janny Sikazwe (Zambia)

AS Vita Club won 4–2 on aggregate.

== Semi-finals ==
In the semi-finals, the four quarter-final winners played in two ties, with the matchups and order of legs decided by draw.

Team 1	Agg.	Team 2	1st leg	2nd leg
Enyimba (Nigeria)	1–3	(Morocco) Raja Casablanca	0–1	1–2
Al-Masry (Egypt)	0–4	(Democratic Republic of the Congo) AS Vita Club	0–0	0–4

3 October 2018
14:00 UTC+1

Enyimba (Nigeria)	0–1	(Morocco) Raja Casablanca
	Report	Hafidi 48'

Enyimba International Stadium, Aba
Referee: Youssef Essrayri (Tunisia)
24 October 2018
20:00 UTC+1

Raja Casablanca (Morocco)	2–1	(Nigeria) Enyimba
Hadraf 45+1'; Oladuntoye 88' (o.g.)	Report	Bashir 89'

Stade Mohammed V, Casablanca
Referee: Eric Otogo-Castane (Gabon)

Raja Casablanca won 3–1 on aggregate.

3 October 2018
21:00 UTC+2

Al-Masry (Egypt)	0–0	(Democratic Republic of the Congo) AS Vita Club
	Report

Al-Masry Club Stadium, Port Said
Referee: Bakary Gassama (Gambia)
24 October 2018
17:00 UTC+1

AS Vita Club (Democratic Republic of the Congo)	4–0	(Egypt) Al-Masry
Ngoyi 6', 39'; Mundele 75'; Batezadio 90+4'	Report

Stade des Martyrs, Kinshasa
Referee: Bernard Camille (Seychelles)

AS Vita Club won 4–0 on aggregate.

== Final ==
In the final, the two semi-final winners played each other, with the order of legs determined by the semi-final draw.

25 November 2018
20:00 UTC+1

Raja CA (Morocco)	3–0	(Democratic Republic of the Congo) AS Vita Club
Rahimi 47', 61'; Benhalib 66' (pen.)	Report

Stade Mohammed V, Casablanca
Attendance: 45,000
Referee: Maguette N'Diaye (Senegal)
2 December 2018
20:00 UTC+1

AS Vita Club (Democratic Republic of the Congo)	3–1	(Morocco) Raja CA
Mundele 45+4'; Batezadio 71'; Ngoma 74'	Report	Hafidi 21'

Stade des Martyrs, Kinshasa
Attendance: 75,000
Referee: Victor Gomes (South Africa)

Raja Casablanca won 4–3 on aggregate.
