= 2018 CAF Confederation Cup =

International football competition in Africa

2018 Total CAF Confederation Cup

Tournament details
- Dates: 9 February – 2 December 2018
- Teams: 54+16 (from 43 associations)

Final positions
- Champions: (Morocco) Raja Casablanca (1st title)
- Runners-up: (Democratic Republic of the Congo) AS Vita Club

Tournament statistics
- Matches played: 170
- Goals scored: 369 (2.17 per match)
- Top scorer: (Morocco) Mahmoud Benhalib (9 goals)

The 2018 CAF Confederation Cup (officially the 2018 Total CAF Confederation Cup for sponsorship reasons) was the 15th edition of Africa's secondary club football tournament organized by the Confederation of African Football (CAF), under the current CAF Confederation Cup title after the merger of CAF Cup and African Cup Winners' Cup.

Raja Casablanca won the title for the first time, defeating AS Vita Club in the final, and earned the right to play against the winners of the 2018 CAF Champions League in the 2019 CAF Super Cup.

TP Mazembe were the two-time defending champions, but as they qualified for the 2018 CAF Champions League and reached the group stage, they were not able to defend their title.

== Association team allocation ==
All 56 CAF member associations may enter the CAF Confederation Cup, with the 12 highest ranked associations according to their CAF 5-year ranking eligible to enter two teams in the competition. As a result, theoretically a maximum of 68 teams could enter the tournament (plus 16 teams eliminated from the CAF Champions League which enter the play-off round) – although this level has never been reached.

For the 2018 CAF Confederation Cup, the CAF uses the 2012–2016 CAF 5-year ranking, which calculates points for each entrant association based on their clubs' performance over those 5 years in the CAF Champions League and CAF Confederation Cup. The criteria for points are the following:

	CAF Champions League	CAF Confederation Cup
Winners	5 points	4 points
Runners-up	4 points	3 points
Losing semi-finalists	3 points	2 points
3rd place in groups	2 points	1 point
4th place in groups	1 point	1 point

The points are multiplied by a coefficient according to the year as follows:

- 2016 – 5
- 2015 – 4
- 2014 – 3
- 2013 – 2
- 2012 – 1

== Teams ==
The following 54 teams from 42 associations entered the competition.

- Teams in **bold** received a bye to the first round.
- The other teams entered the preliminary round.

Associations are shown according to their 2012–2016 CAF 5-year ranking – those with a ranking score have their rank and score indicated.

Associations eligible to enter two teams (Ranked 1–12)
Association	Team	Qualifying method
Egypt (1st – 85 pts)	**Zamalek**	2016–17 Egyptian Premier League third place
Egypt (1st – 85 pts)	Al-Masry	2016–17 Egypt Cup runners-up
Tunisia (2nd – 76 pts)	**Club Africain**	2016–17 Tunisian Ligue Professionnelle 1 third place
Tunisia (2nd – 76 pts)	US Ben Guerdane	2016–17 Tunisian Cup runners-up
(Democratic Republic of the Congo) DR Congo (3rd – 70 pts)	**DC Motema Pembe**	2016–17 Linafoot third place
(Democratic Republic of the Congo) DR Congo (3rd – 70 pts)	AS Maniema Union	2017 Coupe du Congo DR winners
Algeria (4th – 62 pts)	**USM Alger**	2016–17 Algerian Ligue Professionnelle 1 third place
Algeria (4th – 62 pts)	CR Belouizdad	2016–17 Algerian Cup winners
(South Africa) South Africa (5th – 45 pts)	Cape Town City	2016–17 South African Premier Division third place
(South Africa) South Africa (5th – 45 pts)	**SuperSport United**	2016–17 Nedbank Cup winners
Morocco (6th – 41 pts)	**Raja Casablanca**	2016–17 Botola third place
Morocco (6th – 41 pts)	RS Berkane	2016–17 Botola fourth place
Sudan (7th – 35 pts)	**El-Hilal El-Obeid**	2017 Sudan Premier League third place
Sudan (7th – 35 pts)	**Al-Ahly Shendi**	2017 Sudan Cup winners
(Ivory Coast) Ivory Coast (8th – 21 pts)	AS Tanda	2016–17 Côte d'Ivoire Ligue 1 third place
(Ivory Coast) Ivory Coast (8th – 21 pts)	Africa Sports	2017 Coupe de Côte d'Ivoire winners
Zambia (9th – 18 pts)	**Nkana**	2017 Zambia Super League third place
Zambia (9th – 18 pts)	Green Buffaloes	2017 Zambia Super League fourth place
(Republic of the Congo) Congo (10th – 16 pts)	CARA Brazzaville	2017 Congo Ligue 1 third place
(Republic of the Congo) Congo (10th – 16 pts)	CS La Mancha	2017 Congo Ligue 1 fourth place
Mali (11th – 15 pts)	Djoliba	2016 Malian Première Division third place
Mali (11th – 15 pts)	Onze Créateurs	2016 Malian Cup winners
Nigeria (12th – 13 pts)	**Enyimba**	2017 Nigeria Professional Football League third place
Nigeria (12th – 13 pts)	Akwa United	2017 Nigerian FA Cup winners

Associations eligible to enter one team
Association	Team	Qualifying method
Cameroon (13th – 12 pts)	New Star	2017 Cameroonian Cup winners
Libya (14th – 8 pts)	Al-Ittihad Tripoli	2017 Libyan Premier League CAF competition playoff runners-up
Ghana (15th – 7 pts)	Asante Kotoko	2017 Ghanaian FA Cup winners
Tanzania (16th – 5 pts)	Simba	2016–17 Tanzania FA Cup winners
Angola (17th – 3 pts)	Petro de Luanda	2017 Taça de Angola winners
Ethiopia (18th – 2 pts)	Welayta Dicha	2017 Ethiopian Cup winners
Benin	Energie	2017 Benin Premier League runners-up
Botswana	Jwaneng Galaxy	2016–17 Mascom Top 8 Cup winners
(Burkina Faso) Burkina Faso	Étoile Filante	2017 Coupe du Faso winners
Burundi	Olympique Star	2017 Burundian Cup winners
Comoros	Ngazi Sport	2017 Comoros Cup winners
Djibouti	Gendarmerie Nationale	2017 Djibouti Cup winners
(Equatorial Guinea) Equatorial Guinea	Deportivo Niefang	2017 Equatoguinean Cup winners
Gabon	AS Mangasport	2016–17 Gabon Championnat National D1 runners-up
(The Gambia) Gambia	Banjul Hawks	2017 Gambian Cup winners
Guinea	Hafia	2017 Guinée Coupe Nationale winners
Kenya	AFC Leopards	2017 FKF President's Cup winners
Liberia	ELWA United	2017 Liberian Cup runners-up
Madagascar	Fosa Juniors	2017 Coupe de Madagascar winners
Malawi	Masters Security	2017 Malawi FAM Cup losing semi-finalists
Mauritania	FC Nouadhibou	2017 Coupe du Président de la République winners
Mauritius	AS Port-Louis 2000	2017 Mauritian Cup winners
Mozambique	Costa do Sol	2017 Taça de Moçambique winners
Niger	Sahel	2017 Niger Cup winners
Rwanda	APR	2017 Rwandan Cup winners
Senegal	Mbour Petite-Côte	2017 Senegal FA Cup winners
Seychelles	Anse Réunion	2017 Seychelles FA Cup runners-up
(South Sudan) South Sudan	Al-Hilal Juba	2017 South Sudan National Cup runners-up
(Eswatini) Swaziland	Young Buffaloes	2017 Swazi Cup winners
Zanzibar	Zimamoto	2016–17 Zanzibar Premier League runners-up

Notes

1. Mali (MLI): Mali were represented by Djoliba and Onze Créateurs, the 2016 Malian Première Division third place and 2016 Malian Cup winners, as the 2017 Malian Première Division and 2017 Malian Cup were not completed by the end of the year.

A further 16 teams eliminated from the 2018 CAF Champions League entered the play-off round.

Losers of 2018 CAF Champions League first round
(Ethiopia) Saint George	(Zambia) Zanaco	(Ivory Coast) Williamsville AC	(Ghana) Aduana Stars
(Gabon) CF Mounana	(Nigeria) MFM	(Senegal) Génération Foot	(Tanzania) Young Africans
(Kenya) Gor Mahia	(Nigeria) Plateau United	(Sudan) Al-Hilal	(Ivory Coast) ASEC Mimosas
(Mozambique) UD Songo	(Democratic Republic of the Congo) AS Vita Club	(South Africa) Bidvest Wits	(Rwanda) Rayon Sports

Associations which did not enter a team

- (Cape Verde) Cape Verde
- (Central African Republic) Central African Republic
- Chad
- Eritrea
- Guinea-Bissau
- Lesotho
- Namibia
- Réunion
- (São Tomé and Príncipe) São Tomé and Príncipe
- (Sierra Leone) Sierra Leone
- Somalia
- Togo
- Uganda
- Zimbabwe
Location of teams of the 2018 CAF Confederation Cup.
Italics: Teams transferred from the 2018 CAF Champions League
Red: Preliminary round; Green: First Round; Purple: Play-off Round;
Brown: Group A; Orange: Group B; Yellow: Group C; Blue: Group D.

== Schedule ==
The schedule of the competition was as follows (matches scheduled in midweek in italics). The regulations were modified with an additional draw before the quarter-finals. Effective from the Confederation Cup group stage, weekend matches were played on Sundays while midweek matches were played on Wednesdays, with some exceptions. Kick-off times were also fixed at 13:00, 16:00 and 19:00 GMT.

Phase	Round	Draw date	First leg	Second leg
Qualifying	Preliminary round	13 December 2017 (Cairo, Egypt)	9–11 February 2018	20–21 February 2018
Qualifying	First round	13 December 2017 (Cairo, Egypt)	6–7 March 2018	16–18 March 2018
Qualifying	Play-off round	21 March 2018 (Cairo, Egypt)	6–8 April 2018	17–18 April 2018
Group stage	Matchday 1	21 April 2018 (Cairo, Egypt)	6 May 2018	
Group stage	Matchday 2	21 April 2018 (Cairo, Egypt)	16 May 2018	
Group stage	Matchday 3	21 April 2018 (Cairo, Egypt)	18 July 2018	
Group stage	Matchday 4	21 April 2018 (Cairo, Egypt)	29 July 2018	
Group stage	Matchday 5	21 April 2018 (Cairo, Egypt)	19 August 2018	
Group stage	Matchday 6	21 April 2018 (Cairo, Egypt)	29 August 2018	
Knockout stage	Quarter-finals	3 September 2018 (Cairo, Egypt)	16 September 2018	23 September 2018
Knockout stage	Semi-finals	3 September 2018 (Cairo, Egypt)	3 October 2018	24 October 2018
Knockout stage	Final	3 September 2018 (Cairo, Egypt)	25 November 2018	2 December 2018

== Qualifying rounds ==
The draw for the preliminary round and first round was held on 13 December 2017 at the CAF headquarters in Cairo, Egypt. In the qualifying rounds, each tie was played on a home-and-away two-legged basis. If the aggregate score was tied after the second leg, the away goals rule would be applied, and if still tied, extra time would not be played, and the penalty shoot-out would be used to determine the winner (Regulations III. 13 & 14).

=== Preliminary round ===
Team 1	Agg.	Team 2	1st leg	2nd leg
Petro de Luanda (Angola)	5–0	(Malawi) Masters Security	5–0	0–0
Young Buffaloes (Eswatini)	0–2	(South Africa) Cape Town City	0–1	0–1
Costa do Sol (Mozambique)	2–0	(Botswana) Jwaneng Galaxy	1–0	1–0
Energie (Benin)	2–1	(Guinea) Hafia	1–0	1–1
APR (Rwanda)	6–1	(Seychelles) Anse Réunion	4–0	2–1
Djoliba (Mali)	w/o (Note: Djoliba won on walkover after ELWA United withdrew.)	(Liberia) ELWA United	—	—
AFC Leopards (Kenya)	1–1 (a)	(Madagascar) Fosa Juniors	1–1	0–0
Ngazi Sport (Comoros)	2–5	(Mauritius) AS Port-Louis 2000	1–1	1–4
AS Mangasport (Gabon)	1–2	(Democratic Republic of the Congo) AS Maniema Union	0–1	1–1
Olympique Star (Burundi)	1–0	(Burkina Faso) Étoile Filante	0–0	1–0
New Star (Cameroon)	2–2 (a)	(Equatorial Guinea) Deportivo Niefang	2–1	0–1
AS Tanda (Ivory Coast)	0–1	(Republic of the Congo) CS La Mancha	0–0	0–1
Akwa United (Nigeria)	3–2	(The Gambia) Banjul Hawks	1–2	2–0
Al-Ittihad Tripoli (Libya)	4–0	(Niger) Sahel	1–0	3–0
US Ben Guerdane (Tunisia)	w/o (Note: US Ben Guerdane won on walkover after Al-Hilal Juba failed to arrive for the first leg.)	(South Sudan) Al-Hilal Juba	—	—
Asante Kotoko (Ghana)	1–1 (6–7 p)	(Republic of the Congo) CARA Brazzaville	1–0	0–1
Onze Créateurs (Mali)	1–3	(Algeria) CR Belouizdad	1–1	0–2
Al-Masry (Egypt)	5–2	(Zambia) Green Buffaloes	4–0	1–2
Simba (Tanzania)	5–0	(Djibouti) Gendarmerie Nationale	4–0	1–0
RS Berkane (Morocco)	3–2	(Senegal) Mbour Petite-Côte	2–1	1–1
Africa Sports (Ivory Coast)	1–2	(Mauritania) FC Nouadhibou	1–1	0–1
Zimamoto (Zanzibar)	1–2	(Ethiopia) Welayta Dicha	1–1	0–1

=== First round ===
The 16 winners of the first round advanced to the play-off round, where they were joined by the 16 losers of the Champions League first round.

Team 1	Agg.	Team 2	1st leg	2nd leg
Petro de Luanda (Angola)	1–2	(South Africa) SuperSport United	0–0	1–2
Costa do Sol (Mozambique)	2–2 (a)	(South Africa) Cape Town City	0–1	2–1
Energie (Benin)	2–5	(Nigeria) Enyimba	0–2	2–3
Djoliba (Mali)	2–2 (a)	(Rwanda) APR	1–0	1–2
AS Port-Louis 2000 (Mauritius)	0–3	(Madagascar) Fosa Juniors	0–2	0–1
AS Maniema Union (Democratic Republic of the Congo)	3–3 (a)	(Algeria) USM Alger	2–2	1–1
Olympique Star (Burundi)	0–6	(Sudan) Al-Hilal Al-Ubayyid	0–0	0–6
DC Motema Pembe (Democratic Republic of the Congo)	1–2	(Equatorial Guinea) Deportivo Niefang	1–1	0–1
CS La Mancha (Republic of the Congo)	4–2	(Sudan) Al-Ahly Shendi	3–0	1–2
Al-Ittihad Tripoli (Libya)	1–1 (2–3 p)	(Nigeria) Akwa United	1–0	0–1
CARA Brazzaville (Republic of the Congo)	4–3	(Tunisia) US Ben Guerdane	3–0	1–3
CR Belouizdad (Algeria)	3–1	(Zambia) Nkana	3–0	0–1
Simba (Tanzania)	2–2 (a)	(Egypt) Al-Masry	2–2	0–0
RS Berkane (Morocco)	4–1	(Tunisia) Club Africain	3–1	1–0
Raja Casablanca (Morocco)	5–3	(Mauritania) FC Nouadhibou	1–1	4–2
Welayta Dicha (Ethiopia)	3–3 (4–3 p)	(Egypt) Zamalek	2–1	1–2

=== Play-off round ===
The draw for the play-off round was held on 21 March 2018, 19:00 EET (UTC+2), at the Ritz Carlton in Cairo, Egypt. The winners of the Confederation Cup first round were drawn against the losers of the Champions League first round, with the teams from the Confederation Cup hosting the second leg.

The 16 winners of the play-off round advanced to the group stage.

Team 1	Agg.	Team 2	1st leg	2nd leg
Zanaco (Zambia)	0–5	(Morocco) Raja Casablanca	0–2	0–3
AS Vita Club (Democratic Republic of the Congo)	6–1	(Republic of the Congo) CS La Mancha	1–0	5–1
Saint George (Ethiopia)	1–1 (3–4 p)	(Republic of the Congo) CARA Brazzaville	1–0	0–1
Al-Hilal (Sudan)	3–3 (a)	(Nigeria) Akwa United	2–0	1–3
Gor Mahia (Kenya)	2–2 (a)	(South Africa) SuperSport United	1–0	1–2
UD Songo (Mozambique)	4–3	(Sudan) Al-Hilal Al-Ubayyid	3–1	1–2
Plateau United (Nigeria)	2–5	(Algeria) USM Alger	2–1	0–4
Bidvest Wits (South Africa)	1–1 (a)	(Nigeria) Enyimba	1–1	0–0
Aduana Stars (Ghana)	7–3	(Madagascar) Fosa Juniors	6–1	1–2
Young Africans (Tanzania)	2–1	(Ethiopia) Welayta Dicha	2–0	0–1
Génération Foot (Senegal)	3–3 (a)	(Morocco) RS Berkane	3–1	0–2
CF Mounana (Gabon)	2–3	(Egypt) Al-Masry	1–1	1–2
ASEC Mimosas (Ivory Coast)	1–0	(Algeria) CR Belouizdad	1–0	0–0
Williamsville AC (Ivory Coast)	3–2	(Equatorial Guinea) Deportivo Niefang	2–0	1–2
MFM (Nigeria)	0–1	(Mali) Djoliba	0–1	0–0
Rayon Sports (Rwanda)	3–2	(Mozambique) Costa do Sol	3–0	0–2

== Group stage ==
The draw for the group stage was held on 21 April 2018, 14:00 EET (UTC+2), at the CAF headquarters in Cairo, Egypt. The 16 teams, all winners of the play-off round of qualifying, were drawn into four groups of four. The teams were seeded by their performances in the CAF competitions for the previous five seasons (CAF 5-year ranking points shown in parentheses). Each group contained one team from Pot 1 and three teams from Pot 2, and each team was drawn into one of the positions in their group.

Pot	Pot 1	Pot 2
Teams	(Algeria) USM Alger (35 pts); (Sudan) Al-Hilal (21 pts); (Democratic Republic of the Congo) AS Vita Club (15 pts); (Nigeria) Enyimba (8 pts)	(Ivory Coast) ASEC Mimosas (5 pts); (Tanzania) Young Africans (2 pts); (Republic of the Congo) CARA Brazzaville; (Ivory Coast) Williamsville AC; (Egypt) Al-Masry; (Ghana) Aduana Stars; (Kenya) Gor Mahia; (Mali) Djoliba; (Morocco) Raja Casablanca; (Morocco) RS Berkane; (Mozambique) UD Songo; (Rwanda) Rayon Sports

In the group stage, each group was played on a home-and-away round-robin basis. The winners and runners-up of each group advanced to the quarter-finals of the knockout stage.

Tiebreakers
The teams were ranked according to points (3 points for a win, 1 point for a draw, 0 points for a loss). If tied on points, tiebreakers were applied in the following order (Regulations III. 20 & 21):
1. Points in head-to-head matches among tied teams;
2. Goal difference in head-to-head matches among tied teams;
3. Goals scored in head-to-head matches among tied teams;
4. Away goals scored in head-to-head matches among tied teams;
5. If more than two teams are tied, and after applying all head-to-head criteria above, a subset of teams are still tied, all head-to-head criteria above are reapplied exclusively to this subset of teams;
6. Goal difference in all group matches;
7. Goals scored in all group matches;
8. Away goals scored in all group matches;
9. Drawing of lots.

=== Group A ===
Pos	Team	Pld	W	D	L	GF	GA	GD	Pts	Qualification	RCA	VIT	ASE	ADU
1	(Morocco) Raja Casablanca	6	3	2	1	14	5	+9	11	Quarter-finals	—	0–0	4–0	6–0
2	(Democratic Republic of the Congo) AS Vita Club	6	3	1	2	8	5	+3	10	Quarter-finals	2–0	—	3–1	2–0
3	(Ivory Coast) ASEC Mimosas	6	3	0	3	6	8	−2	9		0–1	2–0	—	1–0
4	(Ghana) Aduana Stars	6	1	1	4	5	15	−10	4		3–3	2–1	0–2	—

Source: CAF

=== Group B ===
Pos	Team	Pld	W	D	L	GF	GA	GD	Pts	Qualification	RSB	MAS	SON	HIL
1	(Morocco) RS Berkane	6	4	1	1	7	2	+5	13	Quarter-finals	—	0–0	2–1	1–0
2	(Egypt) Al-Masry	6	3	3	0	7	2	+5	12	Quarter-finals	1–0	—	2–0	2–0
3	(Mozambique) UD Songo	6	0	3	3	5	10	−5	3 (Note: Head-to-head results: Al-Hilal 2–2 UD Songo, UD Songo 1–1 Al-Hilal (UD Songo won on away goals).)		0–2	1–1	—	1–1
4	(Sudan) Al-Hilal	6	0	3	3	4	9	−5	3		0–2	1–1	2–2	—

Source: CAF

=== Group C ===
Pos	Team	Pld	W	D	L	GF	GA	GD	Pts	Qualification	ENY	CAR	WAC	DJO
1	(Nigeria) Enyimba	6	4	0	2	5	5	0	12	Quarter-finals	—	1–0	1–0	2–0
2	(Republic of the Congo) CARA Brazzaville	6	3	0	3	7	5	+2	9	Quarter-finals	3–0	—	3–1	1–0
3	(Ivory Coast) Williamsville AC	6	2	2	2	5	5	0	8		2–0	1–0	—	0–0
4	(Mali) Djoliba	6	1	2	3	3	5	−2	5		0–1	2–0	1–1	—

Source: CAF

=== Group D ===
Pos	Team	Pld	W	D	L	GF	GA	GD	Pts	Qualification	USM	RAY	GOR	YAN
1	(Algeria) USM Alger	6	3	2	1	10	5	+5	11	Quarter-finals	—	1–1	2–1	4–0
2	(Rwanda) Rayon Sports	6	2	3	1	6	5	+1	9	Quarter-finals	1–2	—	1–1	1–0
3	(Kenya) Gor Mahia	6	2	2	2	10	7	+3	8		0–0	1–2	—	4–0
4	(Tanzania) Young Africans	6	1	1	4	4	13	−9	4		2–1	0–0	2–3	—

Source: CAF

== Knockout stage ==
In the knockout stage, the eight teams played a single-elimination tournament. Each tie was played on a home-and-away two-legged basis. If the aggregate score was tied after the second leg, the away goals rule would be applied, and if still tied, extra time would not be played, and the penalty shoot-out would be used to determine the winner (Regulations III. 26 & 27).

=== Bracket ===
The bracket was decided after the draw for the knockout stage (quarter-finals and semi-finals), which was held on 3 September 2018, 19:00 EET (UTC+2), at the CAF headquarters in Cairo, Egypt.

Quarter-finals
(Rwanda) Rayon Sports	0	1	1
(Nigeria) Enyimba	0	5	5
(Republic of the Congo) CARA Brazzaville	1	0	1
(Morocco) Raja Casablanca	2	1	3
(Egypt) Al-Masry	1	1	2
(Algeria) USM Alger	0	0	0
(Democratic Republic of the Congo) AS Vita Club	3	1	4
(Morocco) RS Berkane	1	1	2

Semi-finals
(Nigeria) Enyimba	0	1	1
(Morocco) Raja Casablanca	1	2	3
(Egypt) Al-Masry	0	0	0
(Democratic Republic of the Congo) AS Vita Club	0	4	4

Final
(Morocco) Raja Casablanca	3	1	4
(Democratic Republic of the Congo) AS Vita Club	0	3	3

=== Quarter-finals ===
In the quarter-finals, the winners of one group played the runners-up of another group (teams from same group could not play each other), with the group winners hosting the second leg, and the matchups decided by draw.

Team 1	Agg.	Team 2	1st leg	2nd leg
Rayon Sports (Rwanda)	1–5	(Nigeria) Enyimba	0–0	1–5
CARA Brazzaville (Republic of the Congo)	1–3	(Morocco) Raja Casablanca	1–2	0–1
Al-Masry (Egypt)	2–0	(Algeria) USM Alger	1–0	1–0
AS Vita Club (Democratic Republic of the Congo)	4–2	(Morocco) RS Berkane	3–1	1–1

=== Semi-finals ===
In the semi-finals, the four quarter-final winners played in two ties, with the matchups and order of legs decided by draw.

Team 1	Agg.	Team 2	1st leg	2nd leg
Enyimba (Nigeria)	1–3	(Morocco) Raja Casablanca	0–1	1–2
Al-Masry (Egypt)	0–4	(Democratic Republic of the Congo) AS Vita Club	0–0	0–4

=== Final ===
In the final, the two semi-final winners played each other, with the order of legs determined by the semi-final draw.

25 November 2018
20:00 UTC+1

Raja CA (Morocco)	3–0	(Democratic Republic of the Congo) AS Vita Club
Rahimi 47', 61'; Benhalib 66' (pen.)	Report

Stade Mohammed V, Casablanca
Attendance: 45,000
Referee: Maguette N'Diaye (Senegal)
2 December 2018
20:00 UTC+1

AS Vita Club (Democratic Republic of the Congo)	3–1	(Morocco) Raja CA
Mundele 45+4'; Batezadio 71'; Ngoma 74'	Report	Hafidi 21'

Stade des Martyrs, Kinshasa
Attendance: 75,000
Referee: Victor Gomes (South Africa)

Raja Casablanca won 4–3 on aggregate.

== Top goalscorers ==
Team eliminated / inactive for this round.

Rank	Player	Team	MD1	MD2	MD3	MD4	MD5	MD6	QF1	QF2	SF1	SF2	F1	F2	Total
1	(Morocco) Mahmoud Benhalib	(Morocco) Raja Casablanca		2	1	2		2	1				1		9
2	(Democratic Republic of the Congo) Jean-Marc Makusu Mundele	(Democratic Republic of the Congo) AS Vita Club				2	1		2			1		1	7
3	(Morocco) Zakaria Hadraf	(Morocco) Raja Casablanca				2		1				1			4
3	(Morocco) Soufiane Rahimi	(Morocco) Raja Casablanca						1	1				2		4
5	(Burundi) Bonfilscaleb Bimenyimana	(Rwanda) Rayon Sports					1	1	1						3
5	(Morocco) Mouhcine Iajour	(Morocco) Raja Casablanca						2		1					3
5	(Republic of the Congo) Cabwey Kivutuka	(Republic of the Congo) CARA Brazzaville		1			1		1						3
5	(Democratic Republic of the Congo) Fabrice Luamba Ngoma	(Democratic Republic of the Congo) AS Vita Club					1			1				1	3
5	(Burkina Faso) Alain Traoré	(Morocco) RS Berkane					1	1		1					3
5	(Rwanda) Jacques Tuyisenge	(Kenya) Gor Mahia			1	1		1							3

== See also ==
- 2018 CAF Champions League
- 2019 CAF Super Cup
