= Mundele =

Mundele is a Congolese surname. Notable people with the surname include:

- Benedicte Mundele (born 1993), Congolese fresh-food entrepreneur
- Jean-Marc Makusu Mundele (born 1992), Congolese football player
