= 2017–18 Ligue 1 (Ivory Coast) =

Ligue 1
- Season: 2017–18
- Champions: ASEC Mimosas

The 2017–18 Ligue 1 is the 59th season of top-tier football in Côte d'Ivoire. The season began on 14 October 2017 and ended on 3 June 2018.

== Standings ==
Pos	Team	Pld	W	D	L	GF	GA	GD	Pts	Qualification or relegation
1	ASEC Mimosas	26	20	3	3	54	19	+35	63	2018–19 CAF Champions League
2	Sporting Club de Gagnoa	26	12	8	6	40	24	+16	44	2018–19 CAF Champions League
3	FC San Pédro	26	12	7	7	29	23	+6	43	2018–19 CAF Confederation Cup
4	Africa Sports d'Abidjan	26	11	7	8	31	22	+9	40	
5	Academie de Foot Amadou Diallo	26	9	10	7	25	25	0	37	
6	Bouaké FC	26	9	8	9	24	23	+1	35	
7	USC Bassam	26	9	7	10	23	30	−7	34	
8	Williamsville Athletic Club	26	5	16	5	30	30	0	31	
9	Moossou FC	26	6	12	8	21	26	−5	30	
10	AS Indenié Abengourou	26	7	9	10	17	22	−5	30	
11	AS Tanda	26	5	13	8	16	19	−3	28	
12	SO de l'Armée	26	5	10	11	22	36	−14	25	
13	Stade d'Abidjan	26	5	7	14	16	33	−17	22	Relegated
14	Séwé FC	26	3	11	12	14	30	−16	20	Relegated

Rules for classification: 1) points; 2) goal difference; 3) number of goals scored.

== Top goalscorers ==
#	Player	Club	Number of goals
1	(Ivory Coast) William Togui	SC Gagnoa	23 goals
2	(Burkina Faso) Ahmed Touré	ASEC Mimosas	18 goals
3	(Ivory Coast) Brou Manasse Ngoh	AFAD Djékanou	10 goals
4	(Burkina Faso) Komlan Agbégniadan	ASEC Mimosas	10 goals

== See also ==
- 2018 Coupe de Côte d'Ivoire
