= Ahmed Touré =

Burkinabé-Ivorian footballer (born 1987)

Personal information
- Date of birth: 17 July 1987 (age 39)
- Place of birth: Ouagadougou, Burkina Faso
- Height: 1.87 m (6 ft 2 in)
- Position: Striker

Team information
- Current team: ASEC Mimosas
- Number: 29

Youth career
- 2002–2004: Académie de Sol Beni

Senior career*
Years	Team	Apps	(Gls)
2005–2007	Africa Sports	21	(8)
2007–2008	Asante Kotoko	25	(14)
2008–2010	Lokeren	32	(17)
2010	CS Sfaxien	–	(–)
2011–2012	Asante Kotoko	28	(12)
2012	El Gouna	–	(–)
2014–2016	Asante Kotoko	–	(–)
2015	→ Al-Nejmeh (loan)	–	(–)
2016–2017	Bechem United	25	(13)
2017–2019	ASEC Mimosas	23	(31)
2019–2020	AS Vita	–	(–)
2020	AS Kaloum Star	–	(–)
2021–	Medeama	7	(5)

International career^{‡}
2015–2019	Burkina Faso	3	(0)
- * Club domestic league appearances and goals as of 6 May 2018 ‡ National team caps and goals as of 4 September 2019

Ahmed Touré (born 17 July 1987) is a Burkinabé professional footballer, who currently plays for the Congolese club AS Vita as a striker. He also holds Ivorian nationality.

== Career ==
=== Asante Kotoko ===
Touré began his career with Ivorian club Africa Sports National, before he signed with Ghanaian top–flight Glo Premier League club Asante Kotoko.

=== KSC Lokeren Oost-Vlaanderen ===
On 31 August 2008, Touré signed for Belgian club K.S.C. Lokeren Oost-Vlaanderen in the Belgium Jupiler League, and on 1 November 2008, Touré played his first match against R.A.E.C. Mons.

=== CS Sfaxien ===
In August 2010, Touré signed with Tunisian Ligue Professionnelle 1 club CS Sfaxien for the 2010–11 Tunisian Ligue Professionnelle 1 season.

=== Asante Kotoko (return) ===
In September 2011, Touré returned to the Ghanaian top–flight Glo Premier League for the 2011–12 Ghanaian Premier League season.

=== ASEC Mimosas ===
After a successful spell with Ghanaian outfit Bechem United, by scoring 13 goals for the club in 2 years, Touré then joined Ivorian club ASEC Mimosas on a 2-year deal in 2017. He scored 31 goals during his 2-year stay with the club, including scoring 18 goals in 13 matches to help them win the 2017–18 Ligue 1 (Ivory Coast) and end the season as the second top goal scorer. In his second season, he scored 12 goals in 10 league matches and scored 4 goals in the CAF Champions League with 2 goals in a Cup match.

=== AS Vita ===
In May 2019, after his contract with ASEC Mimosas ended, he joined Congolese club AS Vita Club on a two-year deal. He was signed to replace Jean Marc-Makusu who joined RS Berkane of Morocco in March. In June 2020, he parted ways with club after a mutual termination of his contract.

=== Medeama ===
In January 2021, he returned to Ghana and signed for Tarkwa-based club Medeama SC. He joined them on a 2-year deal during the 2020–21 season. The deal was reportedly worth $20,000. On his return to the GPL, he scored a brace on his debut on 21 February 2021 to help Medeama to a 2–1 victory over Elmina Sharks. His first goal came in the 3rd minute which was the fastest goal in the first round of the 2020–21 season.

== Honours ==
=== Club ===
Asante Kotoko

- Ghana Premier League: 2007–08, 2011–12, 2013–14
- Ghanaian FA Cup: 2013–14

ASEC Mimosas

- Côte d'Ivoire Premier Division: 2017–18

=== Individual ===
- GPL Player of the Year: 2010–11
