= 2018 Coupe de Côte d'Ivoire =

Tournament details
- Country: Ivory Coast

Final positions
- Champions: ASEC Mimosas

The 2018 Coupe de Côte d'Ivoire is the 55th edition of the Coupe de Côte d'Ivoire, the knockout football competition of Côte d'Ivoire.

The tournament began with the preliminary round on 27 April 2018.

In the final on 24 June 2018, ASEC Mimosas defeated Stade d'Abidjan.

== See also ==
- 2017–18 Ligue 1 (Ivory Coast)
