= Deus Kaseke =

Tanzanian footballer

Personal information
- Full name: Deus David Kaseke
- Date of birth: 27 August 1994 (age 32)
- Place of birth: Mbeya, Tanzania
- Height: 1.76 m (5 ft 9 in)
- Position: Forward

Team information
- Current team: Singida Big Stars
- Number: 27

Senior career*
| Years | Team | Apps | (Gls) |
| 2010–2012 | Polisi | | |
| 2012–2015 | Mbeya City | | |
| 2015–2017 | Young Africans | | |
| 2017–2018 | Singida United | | |
| 2018–2022 | Young Africans | | |
| 2022– | Singida Big Stars | 5 | (1) |

International career
| 2015–2016 | Tanzania | 5 | (2) |
- * Club domestic league appearances and goals

Deus Kaseke (born 27 August 1994) is a Tanzanian football striker who plays for Young Africans.
