= Benedicte Mundele =

DR Congo businesswoman

Benedicte Mundele (born 1993), also called Benedicte Mundele Kuvuna, is a fresh-food entrepreneur from the Democratic Republic of the Congo. She is founder and manager of Surprise Tropical, established 2012, a food canteen serving healthy, takeaway food in the suburbs of Kinshasa.

Mundele attended the Elynd Institute in Kinshasa and the Lycée Technique et Professionnel de Kimbondo, joining the Kuvuna Foundation aged 16. In 2014 she was a finalist for the Anzisha Prize. In 2019, she was listed among the BBC's 100 Women.
