= Agyeman Badu Stadium =

Sports venue in Dormaa Ahenkro, Ghana

Nana Agyemang Badu I Stadium
- Interactive map of Nana Agyemang Badu I Stadium
- Full name: Nana Agyemang Badu I Stadium
- Location: Dormaa Ahenkro, Ghana
- Coordinates: 7.26522222°N 2.86536111°W
- Owner: Aduana Stars
- Operator: Aduana Stars
- Capacity: 10,000
- Surface: grass

Construction
- Renovated: 2017

Tenant
- Aduana Stars

Nana Agyemang Badu I Stadium is a football stadium in Dormaa Ahenkro, Ghana. It is currently used mostly for football matches, on club level by Aduana Stars of the Ghana Premier League. The stadium has a capacity of 10,000 spectators. It also hosted Aduana stars in their champions league match against al Tahadi of Libya. It also hosted it first ever CAF confederation cup match between aduana stars and raja Casablanca.
