= Mahmoud Benhalib =

Moroccan professional footballer

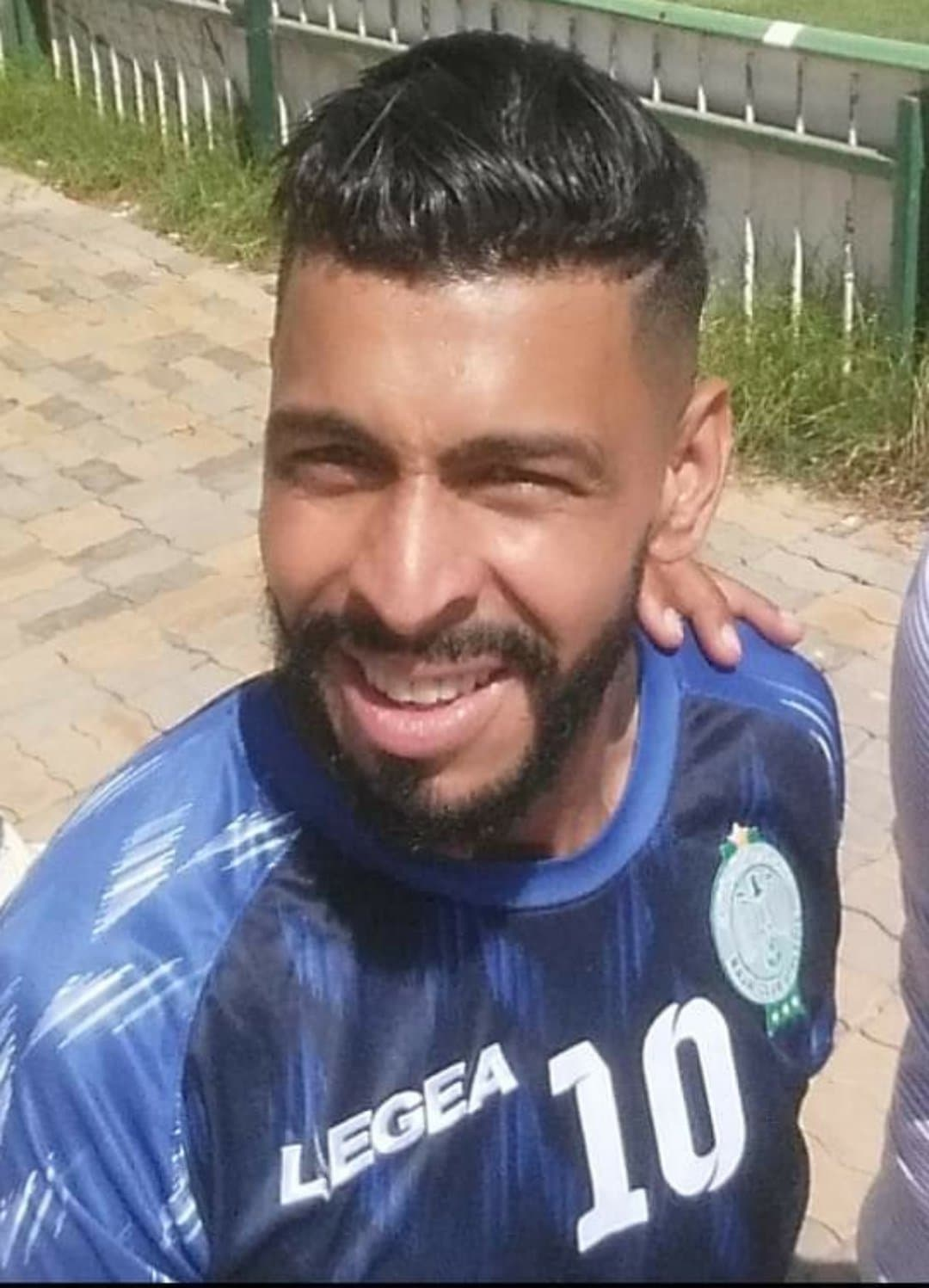
- Benhalib in 2019

Personal information
- Date of birth: 23 March 1996 (age 30)
- Place of birth: Casablanca, Morocco
- Height: 1.80 m (5 ft 11 in)
- Position: Forward

Team information
- Current team: AS FAR
- Number: 10

Senior career*
Years	Team	Apps	(Gls)
2015–2022	Raja CA	176	(47)
2022–	Al-Ahly SC (Benghazi)	0	(0)
- * Club domestic league appearances and goals as of 12 February 2022

Mahmoud Benhalib (Arabic: محمود بنحليب; born 23 March 1996) is a Moroccan professional footballer who plays as a forward for AS FAR .

== Club career ==
Benhalib started his career in Raja Casablanca and made his senior debut in 2015 since then he has scored 25 goals in 38 senior team appearances. He was the winner of the most promising talent award issued by the Union Marocaine des Footballeurs Professionnels, in partnership with the Royal Moroccan Football Federation for the 2017–18 Botola season.

In the 2017–18 CAF Confederation, he finished as the top scorer with 9 goals.

== Honours ==
Raja Casablanca

- Botola: 2020
- CAF Super Cup: 2019
- Moroccan Throne Cup: 2017
- CAF Confederation Cup: 2018, 2021

Individual

- Botola Best Promising Player of the Season: 2017–18.
- CAF Confederation Cup Top Scorer: 2018 (12 goals).
