= Cabwey Kivutuka =

Congolese footballer

Personal information
- Full name: Cabwey Mereve Kivutuka
- Date of birth: 7 February 1998 (age 28)
- Position: Forward

Team information
- Current team: Charlotte Independence
- Number: 16

Senior career*
Years	Team	Apps	(Gls)
2017–2018	CARA Brazzaville		
2018–2019	AS Otôho		
2019–	Charlotte Independence	1	(0)

International career^{‡}
2018–	Congo	1	(0)
- * Club domestic league appearances and goals as of 20:44, 26 August 2019 (UTC) ‡ National team caps and goals as of 11:00, 13 March 2019 (UTC)

Cabwey Mereve Kivutuka (born 7 February 1998) is a Congolese international footballer who plays as a forward for Charlotte Independence and the Congo national football team. He was called up to the Congo national team on 15 March 2019.

== Career ==
Kivutuka first began his career at CARA Brazzaville in 2016. In 2018, he moved to the AS Otôho.

== International statistics ==
As of match played 13 March 2019.

National team	Year	Apps	Goals
Congo	2018	1	0
Total		1	0
