= Mukoko Batezadio =

Congolese footballer

Personal information
- Full name: Mukoko Batezadio Alicia
- Date of birth: 24 October 1992 (age 34)
- Position: Winger

Senior career*
Years	Team	Apps	(Gls)
2011–2013	FC Saint-Éloi		
2013–2015	SM Sanga Balende		
2015–2018	AS Vita Club		
2018–2021	IR Tanger	60	(1)

International career^{‡}
2015–2016	DR Congo	5	(0)
- * Club domestic league appearances and goals as of 15 October 2021 ‡ National team caps and goals as of 1 August 2020

Mukoko Batezadio (born 24 October 1992) is a Congolese international footballer who plays as a winger. He is a free agent, having played most recently for Ittihad Tanger.
