= Maguette Ndiaye =

Senegalese football referee

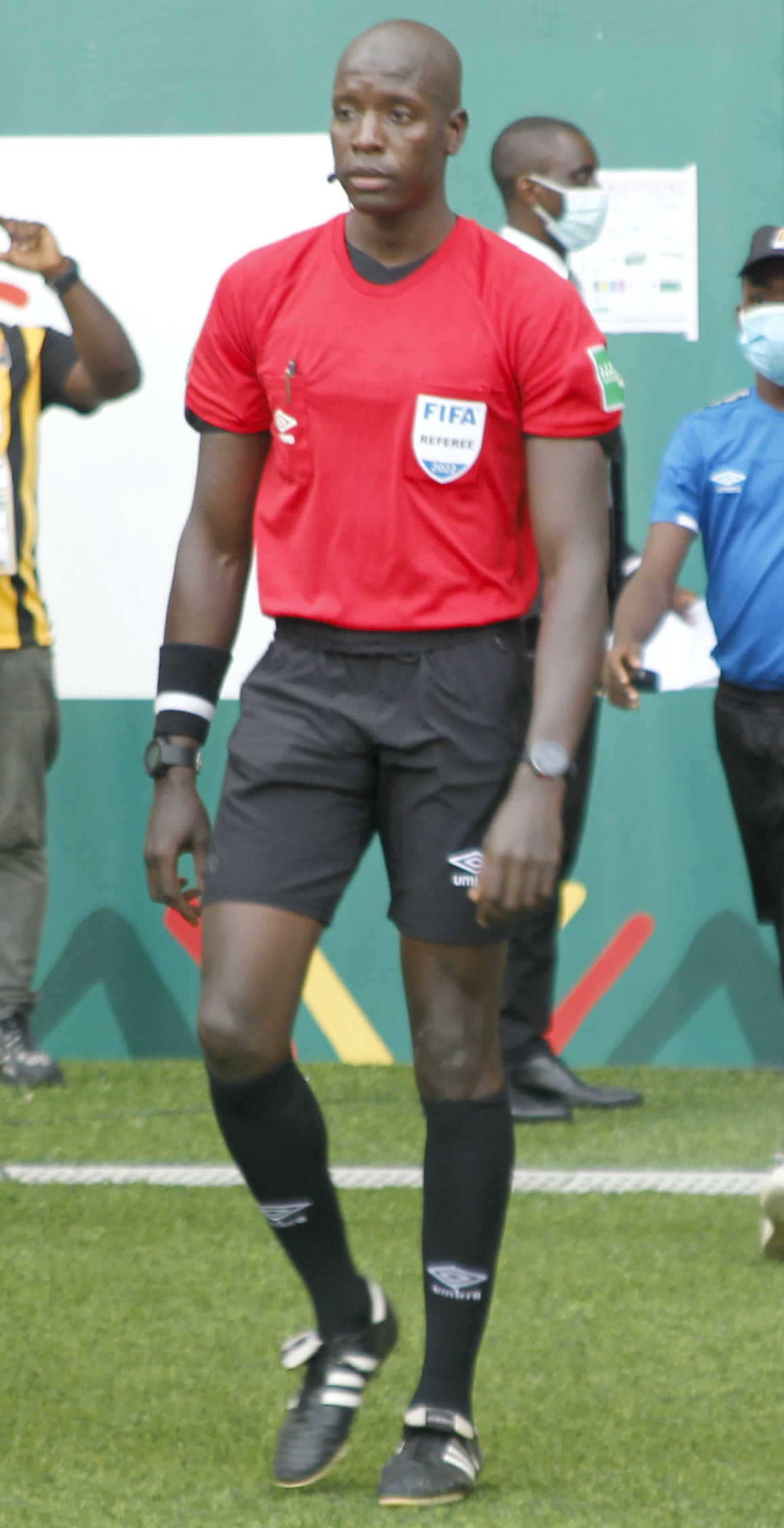
- Full name: Maguette N'Diaye
- Born: 1 September 1986 (age 40); Senegal
Years		Role

International
Years	League	Role
2011–	FIFA	Referee

Maguette Ndiaye (born 1 September 1986) is a Senegalese football referee who is a listed international referee for FIFA since 2011.

== Career ==
Ndiaye was selected to be a referee at the 2022 FIFA World Cup. He previously officiated at the FIFA Club World Cup, CAF Super Cup, AFCON finals, FIFA Under-20 World Cup, African Nations Championship, CAF Champions League and CAF Confederations Cup matches.
