= Jean-Marc Makusu Mundele =

Congolese footballer

Personal information
- Full name: Jean-Marc Makusu Mundele
- Date of birth: 27 March 1992 (age 34)
- Place of birth: Kinshasa, Zaire
- Height: 1.80 m (5 ft 11 in)
- Position: Striker

Youth career
- –: New Bel'Or

Senior career*
Years	Team	Apps	(Gls)
2011–2014	New Bel'Or		
2014–2015	Standard Liège	18	(26)
2014	→ Újpest FC (loan)		
2015	→ MC Oran (loan)	0	(0)
2015–2016	AS Vita Club		
2016–2017	DC Motema Pembe		
2017–2018	Wadi Degla	10	(20)
2018–2021	AS Vita Club		
2020–2021	→ Orlando Pirates (loan)	3	(0)
2021–2022	DC Motema Pembe		
2022–2023	Saint-Éloi Lupopo		
2023	Hajer	14	(3)

International career^{‡}
2014–	DR Congo	8	(5)
- * Club domestic league appearances and goals as of 17:49, 26 March 2021 (UTC) ‡ National team caps and goals as of 16:38, 29 July 2018

Jean-Marc Makusu Mundele (born 27 March 1992) is a Congolese professional footballer who plays as a forward. He participated in the 2014 African Nations Championship with the DR Congo.

== Club career ==
In 2014, Mundele went on a spell with Belgium outfit Standard Liège but was loaned right away to Újpest FC for six months. He was loaned again upon his return to Algerian side MC Oran for another six months, however he didn't take license agreement from Algerian federation. Mundele then left Standard Liège and returned to Congo to join AS Vita Club on a free transfer move. In August 2018, he signed for Egyptian side Wadi Degla on a three-year contract.

In January 2018, Mundele returned to AS Vita Club, where he netted 4 goals against CS La Mancha of Congo in 2018 CAF Confederation Cup playoff round. In November 2020, he signed for Orlando Pirates on a season-long loan deal.

On 27 January 2023, Makusu joined Saudi Arabian club Hajer.

== International career ==
Mundele has played for the DR Congo national football team.

== Career statistics ==
=== International goals ===
Scores and results list DR Congo's goal tally first.

No	Date	Venue	Opponent	Score	Result	Competition
1.	22 January 2014	Peter Mokaba Stadium, Polokwane, South Africa	Burundi	1–1	2–1	2014 African Nations Championship
2.	22 January 2014	Peter Mokaba Stadium, Polokwane, South Africa	Burundi	2–1	2–1	2014 African Nations Championship
3.	6 November 2015	Estádio 11 de Novembro, Luanda, Angola	Zambia	3–0	3–0	Friendly
4.	25 January 2016	Stade Huye, Butare, Rwanda	Cameroon	1–1	1–3	2016 African Nations Championship
5.	19 August 2017	Stade des Martyrs, Kinshasa, DR Congo	Congo	1–0	1–1	2018 African Nations Championship qualification
