= 2013–14 Raja CA season =

Raja CA
2013–14 season
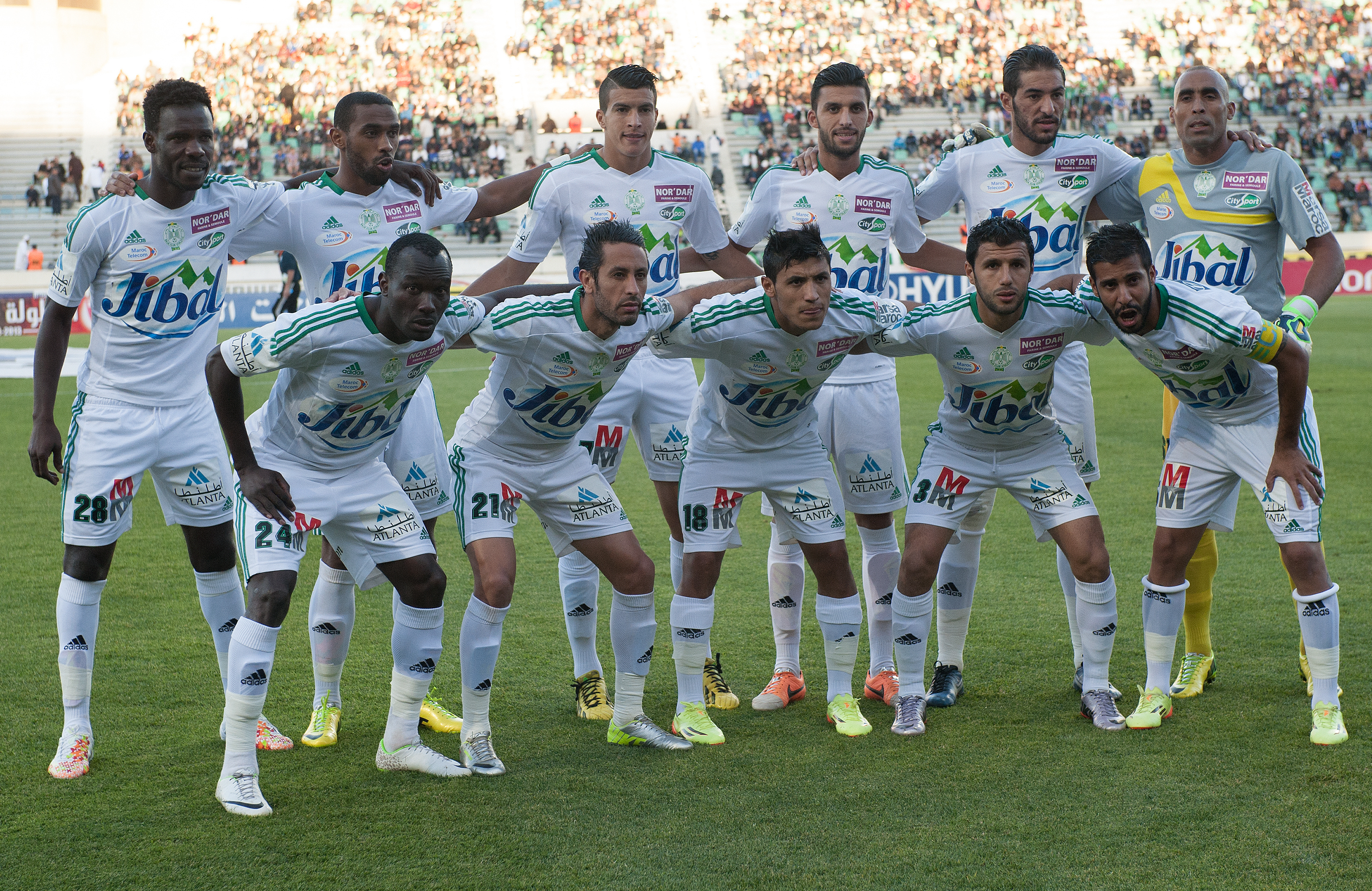
- Raja players against Fath US during a Botola game
- President: Mohamed Boudrika
- Manager: Mohamed Fakhir (until 29 November 2013); Hilal Et-tair (interim, from 29 November to 5 December); Faouzi Benzarti
- Stadium: Stade Mohamed V
- Botola: 2nd
- Coupe du Trône: Runners-up
- CAF Champions League: First round
- 2013 Club World Cup: Runners-up
- Top goalscorer: League: Mouhcine Moutouali (9); All: Mouhcine Iajour (16)
- Biggest win: 6–0 v Diamond Stars (Home, 7 February 2014, Champions League)
Home colours	Away colours

The 2013–14 season is Raja Club Athletic's 65th season in existence and the club's 57th consecutive season in the top flight of Moroccan football.

In the previous season, the team won both of Morocco's domestic competitions. They won the Botola Pro title by finishing four points ahead of AS FAR. They won the Coupe du Trône title by beating the same opponent 5–4 on penalties in the final. Their season wasn't all glory as they lost in the UAFA Club Cup at the semi-final stage, losing on away goals to Al-Arabi SC of Kuwait.

In addition to the domestic league, they played in this season's editions of the Throne Cup, the Champions League and the Confederation Cup. Raja CA kicked off the season with a 1–1 draw against Olympique Safi in the first match of the league.

== First-team squad ==
No.	Name	Nationality	Position
Goalkeepers
1	Yassine El Had	(Morocco)	GK
37	Brahim Zaari	(Morocco)	GK
61	Khalid Askri	(Morocco)	GK
Defenders
3	Zakaria El Hachami	(Morocco)	RB
4	Badr Banoune	(Morocco)	CB
14	Hamza Moussadak	(Morocco)	CB
16	Mohamed Oulhaj	(Morocco)	CB/LB
17	Rachid Soulaimani	(Morocco)	RB/LB
21	Adil Karrouchy	(Morocco)	LB
27	Ismail Belmaalem	(Morocco)	CB
31	Idrissa Coulibaly	(Mali)	CB
Midfielders
5	Mouhcine Moutouali(captain)	(Morocco)	RW
8	Mohamed Amine El Aqmari	(Morocco)	CM
18	Abdelilah Hafidi	(Morocco)	LW
24	Vianney Mabidé	(Central African Republic)	CM
26	Ismail Kouchame	(Morocco)	CM
28	Kouko Guehi	(Ivory Coast)	CDM
55	Merouane Zemmama	(Morocco)	CM
99	Issam Erraki	(Morocco)	CM
Forwards
11	Hamza Abourazzouk	(Morocco)	ST
20	Mouhcine Yajour	(Morocco)	ST
25	Yassine Salhi	(Morocco)	ST
93	Abdelkbir El Ouadi	(Morocco)	FW

== Transfers ==
=== In ===
#	Position	Player	Transferred from	Date
	MF	(Morocco) Issam Erraki	(Saudi Arabia) Al-Raed	12 June 2013
	DF	(Mali) Idrissa Coulibaly	(France) FC Istres	13 June 2013
	MF	(Morocco) Merouane Zemmama	(England) Middlesbrough	27 August 2013
	MF	(Morocco) Abdelkbir El Ouadi	(Morocco) Widad Fez	1 January 2014

=== Out ===
#	Position	Player	Transferred to	Date
	MF	(Tunisia) Adel Chedli	Retired	31 May 2013
	DF	(Morocco) Ahmed Rahmani	Released	1 January 2014
	DF	(Morocco) Redouane Derdouri	Released	1 January 2014
	MF	(Democratic Republic of the Congo) Déo Kanda	Released	1 January 2014
	MF	(Morocco) Chemseddine Chtibi	Released	1 January 2014
	FW	(Morocco) Abdelmajid Eddine Jilani	Released	1 January 2014
	FW	(Morocco) Badr Kachani	Released	1 January 2014

== Friendly Matches ==
19 July 2013	Raja CA	1–0	(France) OGC Nice	Stade Mohammed V, Morocco
20:00	Moutouali 13'	Report

28 July 2013	Raja CA	3–0	(Algeria) MC Alger	Stade Mohammed V, Morocco
20:00	Moutouali 28' (pen.); Salhi 85'; Eddine 90+2'	Report

15 January 2014	Hassania Agadir	1–3	Raja CA	Morocco
15:00

18 January 2014	Union Aït Melloul	3–2	Raja CA	Morocco
12:00

23 January 2014	Raja CA	0–2	(Portugal) Vitória de Guimarães	Stade Mohammed V, Morocco
20:00		Report

29 January 2014	Raja CA	1–0	Renaissance de Berkane	Stade Mohammed V, Morocco
16:00

== Competitions ==
=== Overview ===
Competition	First match	Last match	Starting round	Final position	Record							
Competition	First match	Last match	Starting round	Final position	Pld	W	D	L	GF	GA	GD	Win %
Botola	25 August 2013	25 May 2014	Matchday 1	Runners-up	30	16	7	7	40	15	+25	53.33
Throne Cup	7 September 2013	18 November 2013	Round of 32	Runners-up	5	4	1	0	9	1	+8	80.00
FIFA Club World Cup	11 December 2013	21 December 2013	Play-offs	Runners-up	4	3	0	1	7	5	+2	75.00
CAF Champions League	7 February 2014	8 March 2014	Preliminary round	First round	4	3	0	1	9	2	+7	75.00
Total					43	26	8	9	65	23	+42	60.47

Last updated: 25 May 2014
Source: Sofascore

=== Botola ===
==== League table ====
Pos	Team	Pld	W	D	L	GF	GA	GD	Pts	Qualification or relegation
1	Moghreb Tétouan (C)	30	16	10	4	36	25	+11	58	Qualification to Club World Cup and Champions League
2	Raja Casablanca	30	16	7	7	40	15	+25	55	Qualification to Champions League
3	FUS Rabat	30	12	12	6	31	21	+10	48	Qualification to Confederation Cup (Note: RSB Berkane qualified for the 2015 CAF Confederation Cup as runners-up of the 2014 Coupe du Trône since winners FUS de Rabat qualified for the 2015 CAF Confederation Cup.)
4	Kawkab Marrakech	30	11	15	4	30	19	+11	48	
5	Difaâ El Jadida	30	10	15	5	30	19	+11	45	

Updated to match(es) played on 26 May 2014. Source: Federation Rec.Sport.Soccer Statistics Foundation
Rules for classification: 1) points; 2) goal difference; 3) number of goals scored.
(C) Champions

==== Results ====
25 August 2013	Raja CA	1–1	Olympique Safi	Stade Mohamed V
19:00	Yajour 32'		Madi 55'; Hamdoui (red card) 88'	Attendance: 42,000

1 September 2013	Olympique Khouribga	1–0	Raja CA	Complexe OCP, Khouribga
18:00	Talhaoui 67' (pen.); Talhaoui (red card) 89'

20 September 2013	Kenitra AC	1–1	Raja CA	Stade Municipal, Kenitra
18:00	Alsofi 62'		Hafidi 51'

29 September 2013	Raja CA	0–0	Renaissance de Berkane	Stade Mohamed V
19:00

6 October 2013	Chabab Rif Al Hoceima	0–2	Raja CA	Stade Mimoun Al Arsi, Al Hoceima
18:00			Moutouali 15', 38'

27 October 2013	Raja CA	1–0	FAR Rabat	Stade Mohamed V
19:00	Erraki 45'

3 November 2013	Widad Fez	0–1	Raja CA	Complexe Sportif de Fès, Fes
18:00			Moutouali 22'

9 November 2013	Raja CA	2–1	AS Sale	Stade Mohamed V
19:00	Déo Kanda 24'; Yajour 71'		Koalsee 46'

24 November 2013	Raja CA	1–1	Wydad Casablanca	Stade Mohamed V
15:00	Kouko 89'		Kone 20'	Attendance: 70,000

28 November 2013	Difaa El Jadida	1–0	Raja CA	Stade El Abdi, El Jadida
16:00	Lengoualama 65'

3 December 2013	Hassania Agadir	1–0	Raja CA	Stade Al Inbiaâte, Agadir
16:00	Baraze (red card) 68'; Labaid 79'

28 December 2013	Moghreb Tetouan	1–0	Raja CA	Saniat Rmel, Tétouan
15:00	Naim 62'

2 January 2014	Raja CA	0–0	KAC Marrakech	Stade Mohamed V
20:00

1 February 2014	FUS Rabat	1–0	Raja CA	Stade Moulay Abdellah, Rabat
16:00	Jounaid 18'

19 February 2014	Raja CA	1–0	Maghreb Fez	Stade Mohamed V
20:00	Mabidé 81'

23 February 2014	Renaissance de Berkane	1–1	Raja CA	Berkane Municipal Stadium, Berkane
16:00	Akhmis 16'		Moutouali 20'

12 March 2014	Raja CA	1–0	Olympique Khouribga	Stade Mohamed V
20:00	El Yamiq 84' (o.g.)

16 March 2014	Raja CA	4–0	Widad Fez	Stade Mohamed V
19:30	Yajour 32', 38'; Mabidé 36', 42'

19 March 2014	Raja CA	5–0	Kenitra AC	Stade Mohamed V
20:00	Mabidé 24'; Erraki 28'; Salhi 43', 62'; Moutouali 60' (pen.)

23 March 2014	AS Sale	1–0	Raja CA	Stade Boubker Ammar; Salé, Morocco
14:00	Hibour (red card) 42'; Laabi 78' (pen.)		Belmaalem (red card) 77'

27 March 2014	Raja CA	3–1	Chabab Rif Al Hoceima	Stade Mohamed V
20:00	Mabidé 53', 55', 74'		Halfi 48'

6 April 2014	Wydad Casablanca	0–2	Raja CA	Stade Mohamed V
17:00			Yajour 56'; Moutouali 90+4'	Attendance: 68,000

12 April 2014	Raja CA	3–1	Hassania Agadir	Stade Mohamed V
20:00	Kouko 26'; El Hachimi 33'; Moutouali 40'		Kone 71'

16 April 2014	FAR Rabat	1–3	Raja CA	Stade Moulay Abdellah
17:00	Benjoulloun 80'		Yajour 21', 52'; Karrouchy 46'

20 April 2014	KAC Marrakech	0–0	Raja CA	Stade de Marrakech
17:00

26 April 2014	Raja CA	1–0	FUS Rabat	Stade Mohamed V
19:00	Mabidé 19'		Ndame (red card) 54'	Attendance: 45,000

4 May 2014	Maghreb Fez	0–1	Raja CA	Complexe Sportif de Fès, Fes
17:00			Mabidé (red card) 10'; Yajour 39'

11 May 2014	Raja CA	1–0	Difaa El Jadida	Stade Mohamed V
19:00	Belmaalem 10'			Attendance: 45,000

18 May 2014	Raja CA	5–0	Moghreb Tetouan	Stade Mohamed V
17:00	Moutouali 34', 71'; Abourazzouk 36'; El Hachimi 50'; Karrouchy 83'			Attendance: 45,000

25 May 2014	Olympique Safi	1–0	Raja CA	Stade El Massira
17:00	Rafik 37'

=== Coupe du Trone ===
==== Round of 32 ====
7 September 2013	Renaissance Settat	0–2	Raja CA	Stade Mohammed V
15:00			Moutouali 5', 44' (pen.)

==== Round of 16 ====
25 September 2013	FUS Rabat	0–2	Raja CA	Stade Moulay Abdellah
19.00			Moutouali 42', 55' (pen.)

==== Quarter-final ====
13 October 2013	Raja CA	4–1	US Temara	Stade Mohammed V
19.00	Moutouali 37' (pen.); Chtibi 42', 58'; Tadi 68' (o.g.)		Semmami 90'

==== Semi-final ====
22 October 2013	Raja CA	1–0	Olympic Safi	Stade Mohammed V
17:00	Yajour 50'		Benchaiba (red card) 90'	Attendance: 40,000

==== Final ====
18 November 2013	Difaa El Jadida	0–0 (4 –5 p)	Raja CA	Stade Moulay Abdellah, Rabat
17.00				Attendance: 50,000

=== CAF Champions League ===
==== Preliminary round ====
7 February 2014	Raja CA (Morocco)	6–0	(Sierra Leone) Diamond Stars	Stade Mohamed V, Casablanca
	Iajour 8', 46', 66', 82'; Hafidi 22'; El Ouadi 55'			Referee: Daouda (Niger)

15 February 2014	Diamond Stars (Sierra Leone)	1–2	(Morocco) Raja CA	National Stadium, Freetown
	Fofanah 83'		Mabidé 54'; Zemmama 90'	Referee: Daouda Kebe (Senegal)

==== First round ====
2 March 2014	Horoya (Guinea)	1–0	(Morocco) Raja CA	Stade du 28 Septembre, Conakry
	Keïta 27'			Referee: Badara Diatta (Senegal)

8 March 2014	Raja CA (Morocco)	1–0 (4–5 p)	(Guinea) Horoya	Stade Mohamed V, Casablanca
	Iajour 87'			Referee: Adam Cordier (Chad)

=== FIFA Club World Cup ===
11 December 2013 Play-Off for Quarter-finals	Raja CA	2–1	(New Zealand) Auckland City	Stade Adrar, Agadir
19:30	Iajour 39'; Hafidi 90+1'		Krishna 63'	Attendance: 34,875

14 December 2013 Quarter-finals	Raja CA	2–1 (a.e.t.)	(Mexico) Monterrey	Stade Adrar, Agadir
19:30	Chtibi 24'; Guehi 95'		Basanta 53'	Attendance: 34,579

18 December 2013 Semi-finals	Raja CA	3–1	(Brazil) Atlético Mineiro	Stade de Marrakech, Marrakesh
19:30	Iajour 51'; Moutouali 84' (pen.); Mabidé 90+4'		Ronaldinho 63'	Attendance: 35,219

21 December 2013 Final	Bayern Munich (Germany)	2–0	Raja CA	Stade de Marrakech, Marrakesh
19:30	Dante 7'; Thiago 22'			Attendance: 37,774

=== Overall statistics ===
	Total	Home	Away	Neutral
Games played	43	19	18	5
Games won	26	15*	8	3
Games drawn	8	4	3	1*
Games lost	9	0	8	1
Biggest win	6 - 0 (vs. Diamond Stars (Sierra Leone) )	6 - 0 (vs. Diamond Stars (Sierra Leone) )	3 - 1 (vs. FAR Rabat (Morocco) )	3 - 1 (vs. Atletico Mineiro (Brazil) )
Biggest loss	0 - 2 (vs. Bayern Munich (Germany) )		1-0 (vs. 8 different teams)	0 - 2 (vs. Bayern Munich (Germany) )
Clean sheets	21	13	7	1
Goals scored	65	41	17	7
Goals conceded	23	6	12	5
Goal difference	+42	+35	+5	+2
Average GF per game	1.51	2.16	0.89	1.4
Average GA per game	0.53	0.32	0.63	1
Winning rate	26/43 (60.47%)	15/19 (78.95%)	8/19 (44.44%)	3/5* (60%)
Most appearances	39	(Morocco) Khalid Askri		
Top scorer	16	(Morocco) Mouhcine Moutouali		

Last updated: 25 May 2014
Source: Competitive matches

[*] Lost one match on Penalties

== Squad statistics ==
=== Goals ===
Rank	Pos.	Player	Botola	Throne Cup	Club World Cup	Champions League	Total
1	FW	(Morocco) Mouhcine Iajour	8	1	2	5	16
2	FW	(Morocco) Mohsine Moutouali	9	5	1	0	15
3	AM	(Central African Republic) Vianney Mabidé	8	0	1	1	10
4	FW	(Morocco) Abdelilah Hafidi	1	0	1	1	3
5	MF	(Ivory Coast) Kouko Guehi	2	0	1	0	3
6	AM	(Morocco) Chems-Eddine Chtibi	0	2	1	0	3
7	FW	(Morocco) Yassine Salhi	2	0	0	0	2
8	MF	(Morocco) Issam Erraki	2	0	0	0	2
9	DF	(Morocco) Adil Kerrouchi	2	0	0	0	2
10	DF	(Morocco) Zakaria El Hachimi	2	0	0	0	2
11	FW	(Morocco) Hamza Abourazzouk	1	0	0	0	1
12	AM	(Morocco) Marouane Zemmama	0	0	0	1	1
13	FW	(Democratic Republic of the Congo) Déo Kanda	1	0	0	0	1
14	FW	(Morocco) Abdelkabir El Ouadi	0	0	0	1	1
15	DF	(Morocco) Ismail Benlamaalem	1	0	0	0	1
Own goals			1	1	0	0	2
Total			40	9	7	9	65

=== Assists ===
Rank	Pos.	Player	Botola	Throne Cup	Club World Cup	Champions League	Total
1	FW	(Morocco) Mohsine Moutouali	4	1	1	3	9
2	FW	(Morocco) Yassine Salhi	6	0	0	0	6
3	DF	(Morocco) Adil Karrouchy	5	0	1	0	6
4	DF	(Morocco) Zakaria El Hachimi	2	0	1	2	5
5	MF	(Central African Republic) Vianney Mabidé	3	0	0	0	3
6	AM	(Morocco) Chems-Eddine Chtibi	2	0	0	0	2
7	FW	(Morocco) Mouhcine Iajour	1	1	0	0	2
8	MF	(Morocco) Issam Erraki	1	1	0	0	2
9	DF	(Morocco) Ismail Benlamaalem	1	0	0	1	1
10	FW	(Morocco) Abdelilah Hafidi	0	0	1	0	1
11	DF	(Morocco) Rachid Soulaimani	1	0	0	0	1
12	FW	(Morocco) Hamza Abourazzouk	1	0	0	0	1
13	MF	(Ivory Coast) Kouko Guehi	0	0	0	1	1
