= 2012–13 Raja CA season =

Raja Club Athletic
2012–13 season
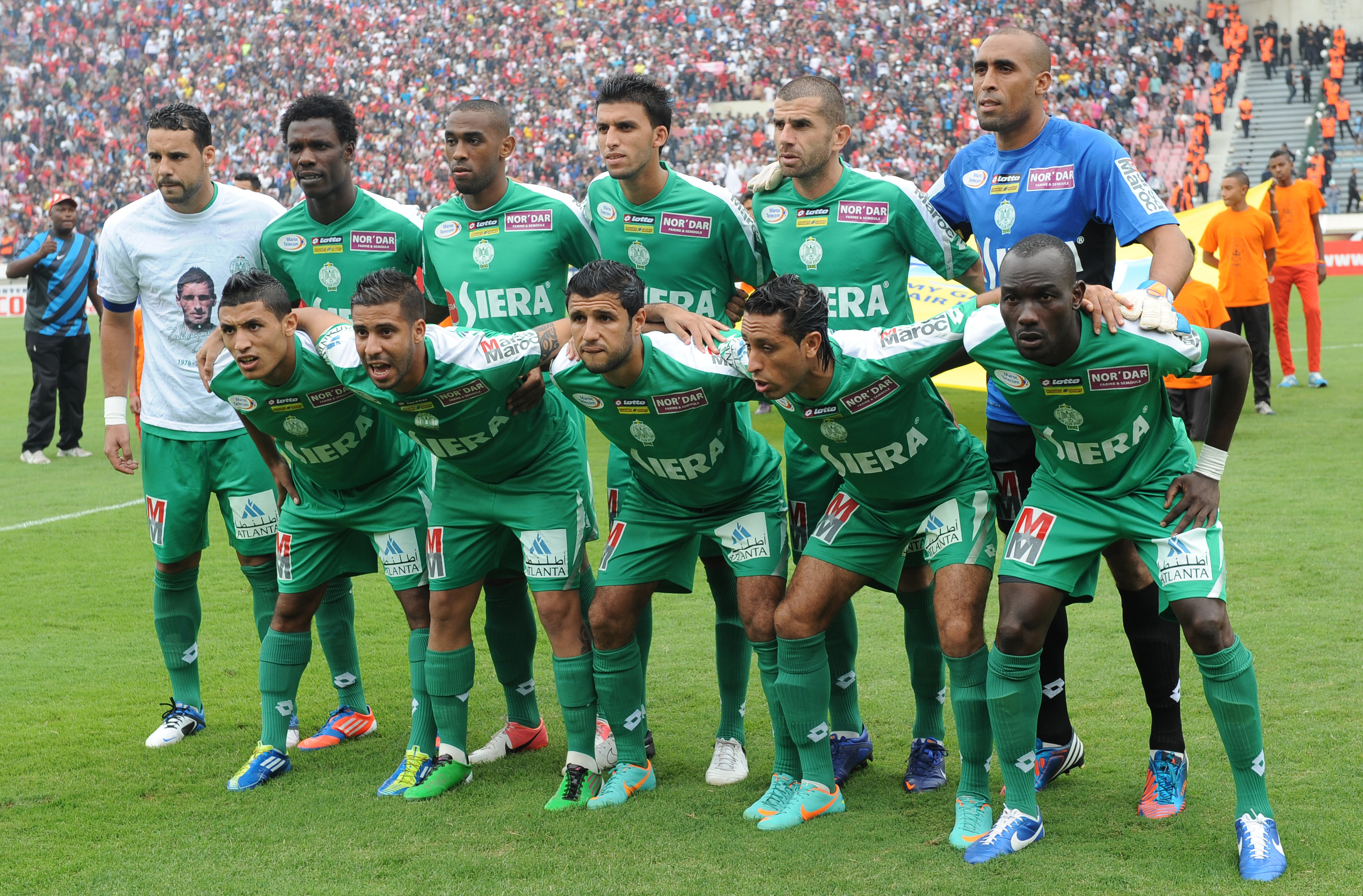
- Raja players against Wydad AC during the Throne Cup semi-final
- President: Mohamed Boudrika
- Manager: Mohamed Fakhir
- Stadium: Stade Mohamed V
- Botola: Champions
- Coupe du Trône: Winners
- Arab Champions League: Semi-final
- Top goalscorer: League: Mouhcine Yajour (9); All: Mouhcine Yajour (12)
- Biggest win: 4–0 v CA Bizertin (Home, 20 October 2012, Arab Champions League)
Home colours	Away colours

The 2012–13 season is Raja Club Athletic's 64th season in existence and the club's 56th consecutive season in the top flight of Moroccan football.

The team finished 4th last season and will be hoping to finish 1st so that they have the opportunity to play in the 2013 Club World Cup which is being held in Morocco. They start the season off with a new president Mohamed Boudrika who brought back manager Mohamed Fakhir who had previous spells with Raja CA winning many titles.

Raja CA kicked off the season with 0–2 win against Olympique Safi in the first round of the Throne Cup.

== Players ==
=== First team squad ===
No.	Name	Nationality	Position
Goalkeepers
1	Yassine El Had	(Morocco)	GK
61	Khalid Askri	(Morocco)	GK
Defenders
2	Mohamed Chibi	(Morocco)	RB
3	Zakaria El Hachimi	(Morocco)	CB
4	Ahmed Rahmani	(Morocco)	CB
6	Abdelfettah Boukhriss	(Morocco)	CB
16	Mohamed Oulhaj	(Morocco)	CB/LB
17	Rachid Soulaimani	(Morocco)	RB/LB
21	Adil Karrouchy	(Morocco)	LB
30	Redouane Derdouri	(Morocco)	LB
81	Amin Erbati (captain)	(Morocco)	CB
	Marouane Hadhoudi	(Morocco)	CB
Midfielders
5	Mouhcine Moutouali	(Morocco)	RW
7	Adel Chedli	(Tunisia)	CM
8	Chemseddine Chtibi	(Morocco)	CM
18	Abdelilah Hafidi	(Morocco)	LW
24	Ismail Kouchame	(Morocco)	CM
26	Vianney Mabidé	(Central African Republic)	CM
28	Kouko Guehi	(Ivory Coast)	CM
Forwards
9	Abdelmajid Eddine Jilani	(Morocco)	FW
10	Badr Kachani	(Morocco)	ST
11	Hamza Abourazzouk	(Morocco)	ST
19	Ismail Bassour	(Morocco)	ST
20	Mouhcine Yajour	(Morocco)	ST
25	Yassine Salhi	(Morocco)	ST

=== Reserve team squad ===
No.	Name	Nationality	Position
Goalkeepers
	Mohamed Boujad	(Morocco)	GK
	Amine Zaid	(Morocco)	GK
Defenders
	Badr Benoun	(Morocco)	CB
	Mohamed-Amine El Aqmari	(Morocco)	CB
	Anas El Asbahi	(Morocco)	LB
	Mohamed El Harouali	(Morocco)	RB
	Omar Arjoune	(Morocco)	RB
	Sadd Kabbah	(Morocco)	RB
Midfielders
	Othmane Aswab	(Morocco)	MF
	Ayoub Boucheta	(Morocco)	MF
	Walid Sebbar	(Morocco)	MF
	Yassine Jlayji	(Morocco)	MF
Strikers
	Yassine Wakili	(Morocco)	ST
	Achraf Gwirih	(Morocco)	ST
	Soufiane Saadane	(Morocco)	ST
	Yassine Feqhaoui	(Morocco)	ST

== Technical staff ==
Position	Staff
First team head coach	Mohamed Fakhir
Assistant Coach	Hafid Abdessadek
General Manager	Hassan Harmatallah
Sporting Director	Salaheddine Bassir
Coach	Abdellatif Jrindou
Goalkeeper Coach	Mustapha Chadli
Youth Coach	Hilal El Tair
Kit Manager	Yaaouri
Club Doctor	Aatik Mohammed

== Transfers ==
=== In ===
#	Position	Player	Transferred from	Date
5	MF	(Morocco) Mouhcine Moutouali	(United Arab Emirates) Emirates Club	7 June 2012
21	LB	(Morocco) Adil Karrouchy	(Morocco) Difaa El Jadida	7 June 2012
9	FW	(Morocco) Abdelmajid Eddine	(Morocco) CODM de Meknès	9 June 2012
	CM	(Morocco) Ismail Kouchame	(Morocco) Olympique Khouribga	11 June 2012
	CB	(Morocco) Marouane Hadhoudi	(Morocco) Raja CA Espoirs	12 June 2012
30	LB	(Morocco) Redouane Derdouri	(Morocco) KAC Marrakech	12 June 2012
4	CB	(Morocco) Ahmed Rahmani	(Morocco) Mouloudia Club of Oujda	13 June 2012
20	ST	(Morocco) Mouhcine Iajour	(Morocco) Wydad Casablanca	14 June 2012
19	ST	(Morocco) Ismail Bassour	(Morocco) US Témara	14 June 2012
3	CB	(Morocco) Zakaria El Hachimi	(Morocco) Union de Mohammédia	14 June 2012
10	ST	(Morocco) Badr Kachani	(Morocco) FUS Rabat	15 June 2012
8	CM	(Morocco) Chemseddine Chtibi	(Morocco) MAS Fez	19 June 2012
	CB	(Morocco) Abdelfettah Boukhriss	(Morocco) FUS Rabat	14 July 2012
24	CM	(Central African Republic) Vianney Mabidé	(Morocco) Difaa El Jadida	15 July 2012
11	ST	(Morocco) Hamza Abourazzouk	(Morocco) MAS Fez	17 July 2012
7	CM	(Tunisia) Adel Chedli	(Tunisia) Etoile du Sahel	21 July 2012

=== Out ===
#	Position	Player	Transferred to	Date
	GK	(Morocco) Younes Ataba	End of Contract	12 June 2012
	GK	(Morocco) Tarik El Jarmouni	End of Contract	15 June 2012
	CM	(Morocco) Abdelhaq Ait Laarif	Released	15 June 2012
	RW	(Morocco) Zakaria Chaabani	Released	15 June 2012
	RW	(Morocco) Idriss Belaamri	Released	15 June 2012
	FW	(Morocco) Zakaria Jaouhari	Released	15 June 2012
	FW	(Niger) Alhassane Issoufou	Released	15 June 2012
	FW	(Morocco) Hassan Tair	Al-Shoalah (Saudi Arabia)	23 July 2012
	FW	(Morocco) Samir Malcuit	MAS Fez (Morocco)	31 July 2012
	RW	(Morocco) Soufiane Talal	MAS Fez (Morocco)	31 July 2012
	CM	(Morocco) Abdessamad Ouhakki	Ajman Club (United Arab Emirates)	3 August 2012
	ST	(Morocco) Hassan Souari	Renaissance de Berkane (Morocco)	14 August 2012
	ST	(Morocco) Soufiane Alloudi	Widad Fez (Morocco)	20 August 2012
	ST	(Ivory Coast) Adama Bakayoko	Widad Fez (Morocco)	20 August 2012
	CB	(Morocco) Rabii Houbry	Termination of contract	10 September 2012
	CM	(Morocco) Abdelhak Talhaoui	Termination of contract	10 September 2012

=== Loan out ===
No.	Name	Nationality	Position	Loaned To
	Abderrahmane El Houasli	(Morocco)	GK	FAR Rabat (Morocco)
	Oumar Diop	(Senegal)	RB	Chabab Rif Al Hoceima (Morocco)
	Ismail Belmaalem	(Morocco)	CB	Baniyas SC (United Arab Emirates)
	Mohamed Achraf Salim	(Morocco)	LB	CODM Meknes (Morocco)
	Ismail Bassour	(Morocco)	ST	Chabab Rif Al Hoceima (Morocco)
	Yassine Wakili	(Morocco)	ST	Chabab Rif Al Hoceima (Morocco)

== Pre-season ==
=== Friendly matches ===
Following several new player signings, Raja CA scheduled a series of friendly matches to prepare for the new season. The club had a very good pre-season winning most of their matches and only losing once.

9 July 2012	Olympique du Kef (Tunisia)	1–1	Raja CA	Stade 7 Novembre du Kef, Tunisia
20:00			Malcuit 7'

13 July 2012	Étoile du Sahel (Tunisia)	0–1	Raja CA	Stade Olympique de Sousse, Tunisia
21:00		Report	Chtibi 82'

17 July 2012	Raja CA	3–1	(Spain) Athletic Bilbao	Stade Mohamed V, Morocco
20:45	Moutouali 12' (pen.); Karrouchy 22'; Iajour 52'	Report	Toquero 49'

21 July 2012	Raja CA	2–1	Racing de Casablanca	Stade Mohamed V, Morocco
23:00	Moutouali 53', 56'	Report	Baabi 60'

28 July 2012	Raja CA	0–8	(Spain) Barcelona	Stade de Tanger, Morocco
22:00			Alexis 12', 40'; Messi 34', 37', 45'; Dani Alves 58' (pen.); Sergi Gómez 87'; Deulofeu 89'	Referee: Hassan Kamranifar (Iran)

7 August 2012	Raja CA	1–1	(Algeria) JS Kabylie	Stade Mohamed V, Morocco
23:00	Moutouali 64' (pen.)		Belkalem 40'

10 August 2012	Raja CA	4–1	CODM Meknes	Raja-Oasis Sports Complex, Casablanca, Morocco
15:00	Hafidi 32'; Erbati 60'; Moutouali 74'; Abourazzouk 82'		69'

14 August 2012	Raja CA	3–1	Raja Beni Mellal	Raja-Oasis Sports Complex, Casablanca, Morocco
16:00	Iajour 58'; Kachani 72'; Moutouali 80'		Denkir 39'

16 August 2012	Raja CA	2–1	(Algeria) JS Saoura	Complexe Wellness, Bouskoura, Morocco
15:00	Eddine 39' (pen.); Salhi 55'		10'

11 October 2012	Raja CA	3–0	US Mohammedia	Raja-Oasis Sports Complex, Casablanca, Morocco
15:00	Eddine 19' (pen.), 80'; Abourazzouk 35' (pen.)

24 October 2012	Raja CA	1–1	Youssoufia Berrechid	Raja-Oasis Sports Complex, Casablanca, Morocco
15:00	Abourazzouk 60'		55'

=== 2012 Tournoi Antifi ===
The tournament is held in honor of the late Ahmed Antifi, a former leader of the hosts Racing de Casablanca and former vice-president of the Royal Moroccan Football Federation.

Teams:

- Racing de Casablanca (Hosts)
- Raja CA
- Wydad Casablanca
- FUS Rabat
- FAR Rabat
- Maghreb Fez
- Difaa El Jadida
- Moghreb Tetouan

==== Group stage ====
Group B
Team	Pld	W	D	L	GF	GA	GD	Pts
FUS Rabat	2	2	0	0	4	0	+4	6
Wydad Casablanca	2	1	0	1	2	1	+1	3
Raja CA	2	1	0	1	1	4	−3	2 (Note: 1 point deducted?)
Racing de Casablanca	2	0	0	2	1	3	−2	0

Notes:

22 August 2012	Racing de Casablanca	1–1 (3–4 p)	Raja CA	Stade Père-Jégo, Morocco
17.00	Bouizi 59'		Kachani 27'

24 August 2012	Raja CA	0–3	FUS Rabat	Stade Père-Jégo, Morocco
15.00			Abu Zuhair 29' Mamadou 74' 90'

== Competitions ==
=== Overview ===
Competition	First match	Last match	Starting round	Final position	Record							
Competition	First match	Last match	Starting round	Final position	Pld	W	D	L	GF	GA	GD	Win %
Botola	16 September 2012	29 May 2013	Matchday 1	Winners	30	19	9	2	56	24	+32	63.33
Throne Cup	23 August 2012	18 November 2012	Round of 32	Winners	5	4	1	0	8	2	+6	80.00
UAFA Club Cup	20 October 2012	3 April 2013	Second round	Semi-finals	6	2	3	1	10	6	+4	33.33
Total					41	25	13	3	74	32	+42	60.98

Last updated: 29 May 2013
Source: Sofascore

=== Botola ===
==== League table ====
Pos	Team	Pld	W	D	L	GF	GA	GD	Pts	Qualification or relegation
1	Raja CA (C)	30	19	9	2	56	24	+32	66	Qualification to Club World Cup and Champions League
2	AS FAR	30	17	11	2	34	18	+16	62	Qualification to Champions League
3	MAS Fez	30	11	15	4	36	27	+9	48	Qualification to Confederation Cup (Note: Difaa El Jadida qualified for the Confederation Cup as winner of the 2013 Moroccan Throne Cup.)
4	Wydad AC	30	13	9	8	31	22	+9	48	
5	MA Tétouan	30	11	13	6	40	28	+12	46	

Updated to match(es) played on 2 June 2013. Source: Botola
Rules for classification: 1) points; 2) goal difference; 3) number of goals scored.
(C) Champions

==== Results ====
16 September 2012	Raja CA	3–0	FUS Rabat	Stade Mohamed V
15:00	Yajour 54', 88'; Hafidi 78'			Attendance: 42,000

23 September 2012	Raja Beni Mellal	0–1	Raja CA	Complexe Sportif Municipal, Tadla
16:00			Mabidé 50'	Attendance: 10,500

29 September 2012	Raja CA	4–2	Kenitra AC	Stade Mohamed V
19:00	Oulhaj 14'; Yajour 18', 61'; Moutouali 44'		Biat 31', 86'	Attendance: 50,000

6 October 2012	Widad Fez	0–2	Raja CA	Complexe Sportif de Fès, Fes
18:00			Hafidi 31'; Abourazzouk 68'	Attendance: 10,000

2 November 2012	Raja CA	2–2	Olympic Safi	Stade Mohamed V
20:00	Salhi 84'; Moutouali 88' (pen.)		Hamdallah 23'; Oulhaj 79'	Attendance: 35,000

11 November 2012	Hassania Agadir	1–0	Raja CA	Stade Al Inbiaâte, Agadir
16:00	Lebhij 45' (pen.)			Attendance: 10,000

21 November 2012	CODM Meknes	0–1	Raja CA	Stade d'Honneur, Meknes
18:00			Hafidi 76'	Attendance: 25,000

1 December 2012	Raja CA	2–1	Olympique Khouribga	Stade Père Jégo
14:00	Abourazzouk 57'; Jilani 64'		Nafae 90'	Attendance: 12,000

5 December 2012	Raja CA	3–1	Moghreb Tetouan	Stade Mohamed V
20:00	Jilani 29'; Yajour 46'; Boukhriss 57'		Traoré 90'	Attendance: 45,000

9 December 2012	Maghreb Fez	0–0	Raja CA	Complexe Sportif de Fès, Fes
15:00				Attendance: 30,000

16 December 2012	Raja CA	1–1	Wydad Casablanca	Stade Mohamed V
14:00	Abourazzouk 68'		Ondama 16'	Attendance: 70,000

20 December 2012	FAR Rabat	1–1	Raja CA	Stade Moulay Abdellah, Rabat
19:00	Mrani 22'		Hafidi 20'; Koucham (yellow card) 52' (red card); Kouko (yellow card) 90+1' (red card)	Attendance: 45,000

25 December 2012	Chabab Rif Al Hoceima	1–1	Raja CA	Stade Mimoun Al Arsi, Al Hoceima
20:00	Diop 80'		Oulhaj 90'	Attendance: 11,000

30 December 2012	Raja CA	3–2	Renaissance de Berkane	Stade Mohamed V
15:00	Chtibi 45'; Jilani 86'; Salhi 90+1'		Sahmoudi 32', 68'; Largou (red card) 83'	Attendance: 25,000

6 January 2013	Difaa El Jadida	1–4	Raja CA	Stade El Abdi, El Jadida
14:30	57'		Abourazzouk 11'; Mabidé 37'; Salhi 41'; Koucham 90+1'	Attendance: 15,000

16 February 2013	Kenitra AC	1–1	Raja CA	Stade Municipal, Kenitra
16:00	El Karoui 16'		Abourazzouk 54'	Attendance: 15,000

20 February 2013	Raja CA	3–0	Raja Beni Mellal	Stade Mohamed V, Casablanca
19:00	Hafidi 18'; Yajour 69'; Moutouali 72'			Attendance: 38,000

24 February 2013	Raja CA	2–1	Widad Fez	Stade Mohamed V, Casablanca
15:00	Yajour 49'; Jilani 83'		Saadi 80' (pen.)	Attendance: 40,000

3 March 2013	Raja CA	3–0	CODM Meknes	Stade Mohamed V, Casablanca
18:00	Salhi 9' (pen.); Yajour 16', 39'		Anis (penalty missed) 43'	Attendance: 35,000

18 March 2013	Raja CA	2–0	Hassania Agadir	Stade Mohamed V, Casablanca
19:00	Salhi 14'; Oulhaj 24'

23 March 2013	Olympic Safi	1–2	Raja CA	Stade El Massira
15.00	Madi 79'		Chedli 54'; Oulhaj (yellow card) 86' (red card); Kachani 90+3'	Attendance: 19,000

30 March 2013	Moghreb Tetouan	1–0	Raja CA	Saniat Rmel, Tétouan
15:00	El Baraka 7'			Attendance: 10,000

11 April 2013	Raja CA	1–1	FAR Rabat	Stade Mohamed V, Casablanca
19:00	Abourazzouk 90'		Kaddioui 45'; Aqqal (yellow card) 90' (red card)	Attendance: 47,000

16 April 2013	Olympique Khouribga	1–3	Raja CA	Complexe OCP, Khouribga
16:00	Grada 56'		Abourazzouk 18'; Karrouchy 87'; Salhi 90'	Attendance: 10,000

21 April 2013	Raja CA	2–1	Maghreb Fez	Stade Mohamed V, Casablanca
15:00	Abourazzouk 53'; Salhi 70' (pen.)		Malcuit 49'; Zekroumi (yellow card) 68' (red card)	Attendance: 43,000

28 April 2013	Wydad Casablanca	1–1	Raja CA	Stade Mohamed V, Casablanca
14:30	Sekkat 30'		Mankari 63' (o.g.)	Attendance: 51,000

12 May 2013	Raja CA	3–1	Chabab Rif Al Hoceima	Stade Mohamed V, Casablanca
14:30	Chtibi 9'; Hafidi 26'; Abourazzouk 38'		El Omari 72'	Attendance: 34,000

21 May 2013	Renaissance de Berkane	1–1	Raja CA	Berkane Municipal Stadium, Berkane
16:30	Baltham 90+6'		Kouko 2'	Attendance: 10,000

25 May 2013	Raja CA	2–1	Difaa El Jadida	Stade Mohamed V, Casablanca
15:00	Karrouchy 67'; Moutouali 90' (pen.)		Hadraf 13'; Jawad (red card) 88'	Attendance: 55,000

20 December 2012	FUS Rabat	0–2	Raja CA	Stade Moulay Abdellah, Rabat
19:00			Chtibi 19'; Mabidé 65'	Attendance: 9,500

=== Coupe du Trone ===
==== Round of 32 ====
26 August 2012	Olympic Safi	0–2	Raja CA	Safi
16.00			Abourazouk 35'; Moutouali 90+1' (pen.); Askri (red card) 47'	Stadium: Stade El Massira

==== Round of 16 ====
1 September 2012	Raja CA	2–1	Hassania Agadir	Stade Mohammed V
20.00	Hafidi 9'; Yajour 45'		Patrick 74'

==== Quarter final ====
16 October 2012	KAC Marrakech	0–1	Raja CA	Stade de Marrakech
20.00			Hafidi 64'

==== Semi final ====
6 November 2012	Wydad Casablanca	1–3	Raja CA	Stade Mohammed V
14:00	Ondama 82'		Moutouali 89' (pen.); Salhi 115'; Hafidi 118'	Attendance: 80,000

==== Final ====
18 November 2012	FAR Rabat	0–0 (4–5 p)	Raja CA	Stade Moulay Abdellah
16.30				Attendance: 60,000

=== Arab Champions League ===
==== First round ====
20 October 2012 1st Leg	Raja CA	4–0	(Tunisia) CA Bizertin	Stade Mohamed V, Morocco
20:00	Yajour 17', 38'; Hafidi 79'; Abourazzouk 89'			Attendance: 40,000

25 November 2012 2nd Leg	CA Bizertin (Tunisia)	2–0	Raja CA	Stade 15 October, Tunisia
13:30	Otmani 8'		Chedli (red card) 44'

==== Quarter final ====
8 February 2013 1st Leg	Al-Quwa Al-Jawiya (Iraq)	1–1	Raja CA	Al-Quwa Al-Jawiya Stadium, Iraq
12:00	56'		Boukhriss 82'

27 February 2013 2nd Leg	Raja CA	2–0	(Iraq) Al-Quwa Al-Jawiya	Stade Mohamed V
19:00	Salhi 34'; Eddine 88'			Attendance: 45,000

==== Semi final ====
12 March 2013 1st Leg	Al-Arabi (Kuwait)	1–1	Raja CA	Sabah Al-Salem Stadium, Al-Mansouriah (Kuwait City)
17:00	63'		Hafidi 82'

4 April 2013 2nd Leg	Raja CA	2–2	Al-Arabi (Kuwait)	Stade El Abdi, El Jadida
18:00	Moutouali 68' 72'		88' 90'	Attendance: 15000

==== Overall statistics ====
	Total	Home	Away	Neutral
Games played	41	19	21	1
Games won	25	15	10	0
Games drawn	13	4	8	1
Games lost	3	0	3	0
Biggest win	4–0 (vs. CA Bizertin (Tunisia) )	4–0 (vs. CA Bizertin (Tunisia) )	1–4 (vs. Difaa El Jadida (Morocco) )	1–1 (5–4 on penalties) (vs. FAR Rabat (Morocco) )
Biggest loss	2–0 (vs. CA Bizertin (Tunisia) )		2–0 (vs. CA Bizertin (Tunisia) )	
Clean sheets	18	8	9	1
Goals scored	74	46	28	0
Goals conceded	32	17	15	0
Goal difference	+42	+29	+13	0
Average GF per game	1.8	2.42	1.33	0
Average GA per game	0.78	0.89	0.71	0
Winning rate	25/41 (60.98%)	15/19 (78.95%)	10/21 (47.62%)	0%
Most appearances	32	(Morocco) Mohamed Oulhaj		
Top scorer	12	(Morocco) Mouhcine Iajour		

Last updated: 15 May 2013
Source: Competitive matches

== Reserve team matches ==
=== Preseason ===
The reserve team also had a lot of Pre-season matches to build a strong team.

1 August 2012	Raja CA	2–0	CODM Meknes	Raja-Oasis Sports Complex, Casablanca, Morocco
15:00

16 August 2012	Raja CA	4–0	IZK Khemisset	Raja-Oasis Sports Complex, Casablanca, Morocco
15:00

19 August 2012	Raja CA	2–0	TAS de Casablanca	Raja-Oasis Sports Complex, Casablanca, Morocco
15:00

1 September 2012	Raja CA	6–4	Association Al Mansoria	Raja-Oasis Sports Complex, Casablanca, Morocco
15:00

=== Elite 1: Espoirs ===
16 September 2012	Raja CA	4–1	FUS Rabat	Raja-Oasis Sports Complex, Casablanca, Morocco
11:00

23 September 2012	Raja Beni Mellal	0–5	Raja CA	Municipal de Kasba Tadla, Morocco
10:30

30 September 2012	Raja CA	4–0	Kenitra AC	Raja-Oasis Sports Complex, Casablanca, Morocco
11:00

7 October 2012	Wydad de Fès	1–2	Raja CA	Stada Hassan 2, Fes, Morocco
11:00

21 October 2012	CODM Meknes	3–1	Raja CA	Meknes, Morocco
11:00

4 November 2012	Raja CA	0–2	Olympic Safi	Raja-Oasis Sports Complex, Casablanca, Morocco
11:00

11 November 2012	Hassania Agadir	0–1	Raja CA	Annexe Al Inbiate, Agadir, Morocco
11:00

18 November 2012	Raja CA	1–2	Moghreb Tetouan	Raja-Oasis Sports Complex, Casablanca, Morocco
11:00

24 November 2012	FAR Rabat	4–2	Raja CA	Centre Sportif des FAR, Sale, Morocco
11:00

1 December 2012	Raja CA	2–1	Olympique Khouribga	Raja-Oasis Sports Complex, Casablanca, Morocco
11:00

9 December 2012	MAS Fez	2–4	Raja CA	Terrain Saadienne, Fes, Morocco
11:00

23 December 2012	Chabab Rif Al Hoceima	0–0	Raja CA	Stade Mimoun El Arsi, Hoceima, Morocco
12:00

30 December 2012	Raja CA	2–0	Renaissance de Berkane	Raja-Oasis Sports Complex, Casablanca, Morocco
15:00

5 January 2013	Difaa El Jadida	0–1	Raja CA	Terrain Synthetique El Abdi, Jadida, Morocco
12:00

17 January 2013	Raja CA	2–0	Wydad Casablanca	Raja-Oasis Sports Complex, Casablanca, Morocco
14:00

9 February 2013	Raja CA	5–1	Raja Beni Mellal	Raja-Oasis Sports Complex, Casablanca, Morocco
12:00

17 February 2013	Kenitra AC	1–4	Raja CA	Kenitra, Morocco
11:00

24 February 2013	Raja CA	7–1	Wydad de Fès	Raja-Oasis Sports Complex, Casablanca, Morocco
11:45

3 March 2013	Raja CA	v	CODM Meknes	Raja-Oasis Sports Complex, Casablanca, Morocco
11:00

=== Challenge Espoirs ===
Last 16

20 January 2013	Raja CA	1–1	Youssoufia Berrechid	Stade Père Jégo, Morocco
14:00

26 January 2013	Youssoufia Berrechid	1–3	Raja CA	Stade Municipal de Berrechid, Morocco
14:00

Quarter – Final

2 February 2013	Raja CA	v	Olympique Khouribga	Stade Père Jégo, Morocco
14:00

== Squad statistics ==
=== Appearances and goals ===
As of 25 December 2012

No.	Pos	Nat	Player	Total		Botola		Coupe du Trone		Arab Champions League	
No.	Pos	Nat	Player	Apps	Goals	Apps	Goals	Apps	Goals	Apps	Goals
1	GK	(Morocco) MAR	Yassine El Had	5	0	3+0	0	1+1	0	0+0	0
2	DF	(Morocco) MAR	Mohamed Chibi	0	0	0+0	0	0+0	0	0+0	0
3	DF	(Morocco) MAR	Zakaria El Hachami	11	0	7+1	0	1+0	0	2+0	0
4	DF	(Morocco) MAR	Ahmed Rahmani	4	0	0+2	0	1+0	0	1+0	0
5	MF	(Morocco) MAR	Mouhcine Moutouali	15	4	8+0	2	5+0	2	2+0	0
6	DF	(Morocco) MAR	Abdelfettah Boukhriss	14	1	8+2	1	0+1	0	2+1	0
7	MF	(Tunisia) TUN	Adel Chedli	18	0	10+0	0	3+2	0	2+1	0
8	MF	(Morocco) MAR	Chemseddine Chtibi	14	1	7+4	1	0+2	0	0+1	0
9	FW	(Morocco) MAR	Abdelmajid Eddine Jilani	15	4	4+8	4	0+1	0	1+1	0
10	FW	(Morocco) MAR	Badr Kachani	12	0	0+10	0	0+1	0	0+1	0
11	ST	(Morocco) MAR	Hamza Abourazzouk	24	7	9+6	5	2+3	1	1+3	1
16	DF	(Morocco) MAR	Mohamed Oulhaj	26	2	17+0	2	5+0	0	4+0	0
17	DF	(Morocco) MAR	Rachid Soulaimani	18	0	11+1	0	4+0	0	2+0	0
18	MF	(Morocco) MAR	Abdelilah Hafidi	22	9	15+0	4	4+1	3	2+0	2
20	FW	(Morocco) MAR	Mouhcine Yajour	24	9	9+6	6	5+0	1	3+1	2
21	DF	(Morocco) MAR	Adil Karrouchy	23	0	14+0	0	5+0	0	4+0	0
24	MF	(Central African Republic) CAF	Vianney Mabidé	24	2	14+1	2	5+0	0	4+0	0
25	FW	(Morocco) MAR	Yassine Salhi	13	4	4+5	3	0+2	1	2+0	0
26	MF	(Morocco) MAR	Ismail Kouchame	5	1	3+2	1	0+0	0	0+0	0
28	MF	(Ivory Coast) CIV	Kouko Guehi	25	0	16+0	0	5+0	0	4+0	0
30	DF	(Morocco) MAR	Redouane Derdouri	5	0	2+3	0	0+0	0	0+0	0
61	GK	(Morocco) MAR	Khalid Askri	22	0	14+0	0	4+0	0	4+0	0
81	DF	(Morocco) MAR	Amin Erbati	19	0	11+0	0	5+0	0	3+0	0
	DF	(Morocco) MAR	Marouane Hadhoudi	0	0	0+0	0	0+0	0	0+0	0
	GK	(Morocco) MAR	Younes Houwassli [L]	0	0	0+0	0	0+0	0	0+0	0
	DF	(Morocco) MAR	Omar Diop [L]	0	0	0+0	0	0+0	0	0+0	0
	DF	(Morocco) MAR	Ismail Belmaalem [L]	0	0	0+0	0	0+0	0	0+0	0
	DF	(Morocco) MAR	Mohammed Achraf Salim [L]	0	0	0+0	0	0+0	0	0+0	0
	FW	(Morocco) MAR	Ismail Bassour [L]	0	0	0+0	0	0+0	0	0+0	0
	FW	(Morocco) MAR	Yassine Wakili [L]	0	0	0+0	0	0+0	0	0+0	0

[L] – Out on loan [S] – Sold

=== Top scorers ===
Place	Nationality	Number	Name	Botola Pro	Coupe du Trone	Arab Champions League	Total
1	(Morocco)	20	Mouhcine Yajour	9	1	2	12
2	(Morocco)	11	Hamza Abourazzouk	9	1	1	11
3	(Morocco)	18	Abdelilah Hafidi	6	3	2	11
4	(Morocco)	25	Yassine Salhi	7	1	1	9
5	(Morocco)	5	Mouhcine Moutouali	4	2	2	8
6	(Morocco)	9	Abdelmajid Eddine	4	0	1	5
7	(Morocco)	16	Mohamed Oulhaj	3	0	0	3
8	(Central African Republic)	24	Vianney Mabidé	3	0	0	3
9	(Morocco)	8	Chemseddine Chtibi	3	0	0	3
10	(Morocco)	6	Abdelfettah Boukhriss	1	0	1	2
11	(Morocco)	21	Adil Kerrouchy	2	0	0	2
12	(Tunisia)	14	Adel Chedli	1	0	0	1
13	(Morocco)	10	Badr Kachani	1	0	0	1
14	(Ivory Coast)	28	Kouko Guehi	1	0	0	1
15	(Morocco)	26	Ismail Kouchame	1	0	0	1
Own goal				1	0	0	1
			TOTALS	56	8	10	74

=== Disciplinary record ===
Nationality	Position	Number	Name	Botola		Coupe du Trone		Arab Champions League		Total	
Nationality	Position	Number	Name	Yellow card	Red card	Yellow card	Red card	Yellow card	Red card	Yellow card	Red card
(Morocco)	GK	61	Khalid Askri	1	0	0	1	0	0	1	1
(Morocco)	GK	1	Yassine El Had	0	0	1	0	0	0	1	0
(Morocco)	DF	3	Zakaria El Hachimi	3	0	1	0	0	0	4	0
(Morocco)	DF	4	Ahmed Rahmani	0	0	1	0	0	0	1	0
(Morocco)	MF	5	Mouhcine Moutouali	4	0	2	0	1	0	7	0
(Morocco)	DF	6	Abdelfettah Boukhriss	2	0	0	0	0	0	2	0
(Tunisia)	MF	7	Adel Chedli	1	0	0	0	0	1	1	1
(Morocco)	MF	8	Chemseddine Chtibi	2	0	1	0	0	0	3	0
(Morocco)	ST	9	Abdelmajid Eddine	3	0	0	0	0	0	3	0
(Morocco)	ST	10	Badr Kachani	1	0	0	0	0	0	1	0
(Morocco)	ST	11	Hamza Abourazzouk	1	0	1	0	0	0	2	0
(Morocco)	DF	16	Mohamed Oulhaj	0	0	1	0	0	0	1	0
(Morocco)	DF	17	Rachid Soulaimani	4	0	1	0	0	0	5	0
(Morocco)	ST	18	Abdelilah Hafidi	2	0	0	0	0	0	2	0
(Morocco)	ST	20	Mouhcine Yajour	2	0	0	0	1	0	3	0
(Morocco)	DF	21	Adil Karrouchy	1	0	0	0	0	0	1	0
(Central African Republic)	MF	24	Vianney Mabidé	4	0	3	0	0	0	7	0
(Morocco)	ST	25	Yassine Salhi	1	0	0	0	1	0	2	0
(Morocco)	ST	26	Ismail Kouchame	1	1	0	0	0	0	1	1
(Ivory Coast)	MF	28	Kouko Guehi	4	1	2	0	0	0	6	1
(Morocco)	DF	81	Amin Erbate	5	0	0	0	0	0	5	0
			TOTALS	43	2	14	1	2	1	59	4
