= 2013 FIFA Club World Cup squads =

Football tournament squads

Each team in the 2013 FIFA Club World Cup had to name a 23-man squad (three of whom must be goalkeepers) by the FIFA deadline of 29 November 2013. Injury replacements were allowed until 24 hours before the team's first match.

== Al-Ahly ==
Manager: (Egypt) Mohamed Youssef

Note: Flags indicate national team as defined under FIFA eligibility rules; some limited exceptions apply. Players may hold more than one non-FIFA nationality.

No.	Pos.	Nation	Player
1	GK	EGY	Sherif Ekramy
2	MF	EGY	Sabri Raheel
3	DF	EGY	Rami Rabia
4	DF	EGY	Sherif Abdel-Fadil
6	DF	EGY	Wael Gomaa (captain)
7	MF	EGY	Manga
8	MF	EGY	Shehab El-Din Ahmed
9	FW	EGY	Emad Moteab
10	MF	EGY	Ahmed Shoukry
11	MF	EGY	Walid Soliman
12	MF	EGY	Ahmad Shedid Qinawi
13	GK	EGY	Ahmed Adel Abd El-Moneam

No.	Pos.	Nation	Player
16	GK	EGY	Mahmoud Abou El-Saoud
17	FW	EGY	Amr Gamal
18	FW	EGY	Elsayed Hamdi
19	MF	EGY	Abdallah Said
20	DF	EGY	Saad Samir
22	MF	EGY	Mohamed Aboutrika
23	DF	EGY	Mohamed Nagieb
24	MF	EGY	Ahmed Fathy
25	MF	EGY	Hossam Ashour
26	FW	MTN	Dominique Da Silva
27	MF	EGY	Trezeguet

== Atlético Mineiro ==
Manager: (Brazil) Cuca

Note: Flags indicate national team as defined under FIFA eligibility rules; some limited exceptions apply. Players may hold more than one non-FIFA nationality.

No.	Pos.	Nation	Player
1	GK	BRA	Victor
2	DF	BRA	Marcos Rocha
3	DF	BRA	Leonardo Silva
4	DF	BRA	Réver (captain)
5	MF	BRA	Pierre
6	DF	BRA	Júnior César
7	FW	BRA	Jô
8	MF	BRA	Leandro Donizete
9	FW	BRA	Diego Tardelli
10	MF	BRA	Ronaldinho
11	FW	BRA	Fernandinho
14	DF	BRA	Lucas Cândido

No.	Pos.	Nation	Player
15	MF	BRA	Gilberto Silva
17	FW	BRA	Guilherme
19	FW	BRA	Alecsandro
23	GK	BRA	Lee
25	FW	BRA	Neto Berola
26	DF	BRA	Carlos César
27	FW	BRA	Luan
28	MF	BRA	Josué
29	DF	BRA	Michel
87	GK	BRA	Giovanni
88	MF	BRA	Rosinei

== Auckland City ==
Manager: (Spain) Ramon Tribulietx

Note: Flags indicate national team as defined under FIFA eligibility rules; some limited exceptions apply. Players may hold more than one non-FIFA nationality.

No.	Pos.	Nation	Player
1	GK	NZL	Tamati Williams
3	DF	JPN	Takuya Iwata
4	MF	CRO	Mario Bilen
5	DF	ESP	Ángel Berlanga
6	DF	ENG	John Irving
7	DF	NZL	James Pritchett
8	MF	WAL	Christopher Bale
9	FW	ENG	Darren White
10	FW	NZL	Ryan De Vries
11	MF	NZL	Daniel Koprivcic
12	FW	FIJ	Roy Krishna
13	MF	NZL	Alex Feneridis

No.	Pos.	Nation	Player
14	FW	ENG	Adam Dickinson
15	DF	NZL	Ivan Vicelich (captain)
16	MF	ESP	Cristóbal Márquez Crespo
17	DF	NZL	Adam McGeorge
18	GK	NZL	Louie Caunter
19	FW	PNG	David Browne
20	FW	ARG	Emiliano Tade
21	FW	NZL	Rory Turner
22	DF	NZL	Andrew Milne
23	MF	ENG	Sam Burfoot
24	GK	NZL	Oliver Sail

== Bayern Munich ==
Manager: (Spain) Pep Guardiola

Note: Flags indicate national team as defined under FIFA eligibility rules; some limited exceptions apply. Players may hold more than one non-FIFA nationality.

No.	Pos.	Nation	Player
1	GK	GER	Manuel Neuer
4	DF	BRA	Dante
5	DF	BEL	Daniel Van Buyten
6	MF	ESP	Thiago
7	MF	FRA	Franck Ribéry
8	MF	ESP	Javi Martínez
9	FW	CRO	Mario Mandžukić
11	MF	SUI	Xherdan Shaqiri
13	DF	BRA	Rafinha
14	FW	PER	Claudio Pizarro
15	DF	GER	Jan Kirchhoff
17	DF	GER	Jérôme Boateng

No.	Pos.	Nation	Player
19	MF	GER	Mario Götze
21	DF	GER	Philipp Lahm (captain)
22	GK	GER	Tom Starke
23	MF	GER	Mitchell Weiser
25	FW	GER	Thomas Müller
26	DF	GER	Diego Contento
27	DF	AUT	David Alaba
32	GK	GER	Lukas Raeder
34	MF	DEN	Pierre-Emile Højbjerg
37	MF	USA	Julian Green
39	MF	GER	Toni Kroos

== Guangzhou Evergrande ==
Manager: (Italy) Marcello Lippi

Note: Flags indicate national team as defined under FIFA eligibility rules; some limited exceptions apply. Players may hold more than one non-FIFA nationality.

No.	Pos.	Nation	Player
1	GK	CHN	Yang Jun
3	DF	CHN	Yi Teng
4	DF	CHN	Zhao Peng
5	DF	CHN	Zhang Linpeng
6	DF	CHN	Feng Xiaoting
7	MF	CHN	Feng Junyan
8	MF	CHN	Qin Sheng
9	MF	BRA	Elkeson
10	MF	CHN	Zheng Zhi (captain)
11	FW	BRA	Muriqui
14	MF	CHN	Feng Renliang

No.	Pos.	Nation	Player
15	MF	ARG	Darío Conca
16	MF	CHN	Huang Bowen
19	GK	CHN	Zeng Cheng
22	GK	CHN	Li Shuai
28	DF	KOR	Kim Young-Gwon
29	FW	CHN	Gao Lin
30	FW	CHN	Yang Chaosheng
32	DF	CHN	Sun Xiang
33	DF	CHN	Rong Hao
34	FW	CHN	Hu Weiwei
37	MF	CHN	Zhao Xuri

== Monterrey ==
Manager: (Mexico) José Guadalupe Cruz

Note: Flags indicate national team as defined under FIFA eligibility rules; some limited exceptions apply. Players may hold more than one non-FIFA nationality.

No.	Pos.	Nation	Player
1	GK	MEX	Jonathan Orozco
2	DF	MEX	Severo Meza
3	DF	MEX	Leobardo López
4	DF	MEX	Ricardo Osorio
5	DF	MEX	Darvin Chávez
6	DF	MEX	Efraín Juárez
7	MF	BRA	Lucas Silva
9	FW	ECU	Marlon de Jesús
11	FW	MEX	Guillermo Madrigal
12	GK	MEX	Luis Cárdenas
13	DF	MEX	Oscar García
14	DF	MEX	Alejandro García

No.	Pos.	Nation	Player
15	DF	ARG	José María Basanta (captain)
16	MF	MEX	Marcelo Gracia
17	MF	MEX	Jesús Zavala
18	MF	ARG	Neri Cardozo
19	FW	ARG	César Delgado
20	DF	MEX	Gael Acosta
21	MF	MEX	Gerardo Moreno
22	DF	MEX	Bernardo Hernández
23	GK	MEX	Juan de Dios Ibarra
26	FW	CHI	Humberto Suazo
27	MF	MEX	Omar Arellano

== Raja CA ==
Manager: (Tunisia) Faouzi Benzarti

Note: Flags indicate national team as defined under FIFA eligibility rules; some limited exceptions apply. Players may hold more than one non-FIFA nationality.

No.	Pos.	Nation	Player
1	GK	MAR	Yassine El Had
3	DF	MAR	Zakaria El Hachimi
4	DF	MAR	Ahmed Rahmani
5	MF	MAR	Mouhcine Moutouali (captain)
7	MF	COD	Déo Kanda
8	MF	MAR	Chemseddine Chtibi
9	FW	MAR	Abdelmajid Dine
10	FW	MAR	Badr Kachani
16	DF	MAR	Mohamed Oulhaj
17	DF	MAR	Rachid Soulaimani
18	MF	MAR	Abdelilah Hafidi
20	FW	MAR	Mouhcine Iajour

No.	Pos.	Nation	Player
21	DF	MAR	Adil Karrouchy
24	MF	CTA	Vianney Mabidé
25	FW	MAR	Yassine Salhi
26	MF	MAR	Ismail Kouchame
27	DF	MAR	Ismail Belmaalem
28	MF	CIV	Kouko Guehi
30	MF	MAR	Redouane Dardouri
31	DF	MLI	Idrissa Coulibaly
37	GK	MAR	Brahim Zaari
61	GK	MAR	Khalid Askri
99	MF	MAR	Issam Erraki
