= 2013 FIFA Club World Cup final =

- Event: 2013 FIFA Club World Cup
Bayern Munich	Raja Casablanca
(Germany)	(Morocco)
2	0
- Date: 21 December 2013
- Venue: Stade de Marrakech, Marrakesh
- Man of the Match: Franck Ribéry (Bayern Munich)
- Referee: Sandro Ricci (Brazil)
- Attendance: 37,774
- Weather: Clear night 13 °C (55 °F); 65% humidity

The 2013 FIFA Club World Cup final was the final match of the 2013 FIFA Club World Cup, an association football tournament hosted by Morocco. It was the 10th final of the FIFA Club World Cup, a FIFA-organised tournament between the winners of the six continental confederations as well as the host nation's league champions.

The final was contested between German club Bayern Munich, representing UEFA as the reigning champions of the UEFA Champions League, and Moroccan club Raja Casablanca, representing the host country as the reigning champions of the Botola. It was played at the Stade de Marrakech in Marrakesh on 21 December 2013.

== Background ==
=== Bayern Munich ===
Bayern Munich qualified for the tournament as winners of the 2012–13 UEFA Champions League, following a 2–1 win against Borussia Dortmund in the final. This was Bayern Munich's first time competing in the tournament. They twice won the Intercontinental Cup, the predecessor of the FIFA Club World Cup, in 1976 and 2001. They reached the final after defeating Chinese club Guangzhou Evergrande in the semi-finals.

=== Raja Casablanca ===
Raja Casablanca won the 2012–13 Botola to earn the host country berth of the tournament. This was Raja Casablanca's second time competing in the tournament, having participated in the competition in the inaugural edition in 2000. They were the second team to reach the final of the competition (after Corinthians in 2000) under the condition of being the host nation's national champions, as well as the second African finalist (after TP Mazembe in 2010). They reached the final after defeating New Zealand club Auckland City in the play-off round, Mexican club Monterrey in the quarter-finals, and Brazilian club Atletico Mineiro in the semi-finals.

== Route to the final ==
(Germany) Bayern Munich	Team	(Morocco) Raja Casablanca
UEFA	Confederation	CAF
Winners of the 2012–13 UEFA Champions League	Qualification	Winners of the 2012–13 Botola
Bye	Play-off round	2–1 (New Zealand) Auckland City (Iajour 39', Hafidi 90+2')
Bye	Quarter-finals	2–1 (a.e.t.) (Mexico) Monterrey (Chtibi 24', Guehi 95')
3–0 (China) Guangzhou Evergrande (Ribéry 40', Mandžukić 44', Götze 47')	Semi-finals	3–1 (Brazil) Atlético Mineiro (Iajour 51', Moutouali 84' (pen.), Mabidé 90+4')

== Match ==
=== Summary ===
Bayern Munich defender Dante opened the scoring in the seventh minute; after Jérôme Boateng headed Xherdan Shaqiri's corner into his path, he turned and shot past goalkeeper Khalid Askri. Thiago got the second for Bayern in the 22nd minute, when he shot right-footed into the far corner from the edge of the penalty area after a pull-back pass from the left from David Alaba. Bayern had the chance to add a third midway through the second half, but Shaqiri hit the crossbar from six yards before Thiago shot the rebound high and wide. Raja Casablanca almost got themselves back into the game late on, when Vianney Mabidé found himself onside only to shoot straight at Manuel Neuer in the Bayern goal, and captain Mouhcine Moutouali hit the rebound over the bar from just outside the goal area.

=== Details ===
21 December 2013
19:30 UTC±0

Bayern Munich (Germany)	2–0	(Morocco) Raja Casablanca
Dante 7'; Thiago 22'	Report

Stade de Marrakech, Marrakesh
Attendance: 37,774
Referee: Sandro Ricci (Brazil)

Bayern Munich	Raja Casablanca

GK	1	(Germany) Manuel Neuer
RB	13	(Brazil) Rafinha
CB	17	(Germany) Jérôme Boateng
CB	4	(Brazil) Dante
LB	27	(Austria) David Alaba
DM	21	(Germany) Philipp Lahm (c)
RM	11	(Switzerland) Xherdan Shaqiri	(substituted off) 80'
CM	6	(Spain) Thiago
CM	39	(Germany) Toni Kroos	(substituted off) 60'
LM	7	(France) Franck Ribéry
CF	25	(Germany) Thomas Müller	(substituted off) 76'
Substitutes:
GK	22	(Germany) Tom Starke
GK	32	(Germany) Lukas Raeder
DF	5	(Belgium) Daniel Van Buyten
DF	15	(Germany) Jan Kirchhoff
DF	26	(Germany) Diego Contento
MF	8	(Spain) Javi Martínez	(substituted on) 60'
MF	19	(Germany) Mario Götze	(substituted on) 80'
MF	23	(Germany) Mitchell Weiser
MF	34	(Denmark) Pierre-Emile Højbjerg
MF	37	(United States) Julian Green
FW	9	(Croatia) Mario Mandžukić	(substituted on) 76'
FW	14	(Peru) Claudio Pizarro
Manager:
(Spain) Pep Guardiola

GK	61	(Morocco) Khalid Askri
RB	3	(Morocco) Zakaria El Hachimi
CB	27	(Morocco) Ismail Benlamalem
CB	16	(Morocco) Mohamed Oulhaj	(yellow card) 55'
LB	21	(Morocco) Adil Kerrouchy
CM	99	(Morocco) Issam Erraki
CM	28	(Ivory Coast) Kouko Guehi
RW	5	(Morocco) Mouhcine Moutouali (c)
AM	8	(Morocco) Chemseddine Chtibi		(substituted off) 50'
LW	18	(Morocco) Abdelilah Hafidi		(substituted off) 88'
CF	20	(Morocco) Mouhcine Iajour		(substituted off) 78'
Substitutes:
GK	1	(Morocco) Yassine El Had
GK	37	(Morocco) Brahim Zaari
DF	4	(Morocco) Ahmed Rahmani
DF	17	(Morocco) Rachid Soulaimani	(yellow card) 79'	(substituted on) 78'
DF	31	(Mali) Idrissa Coulibaly
MF	7	(Democratic Republic of the Congo) Déo Kanda
MF	24	(Central African Republic) Vianney Mabidé		(substituted on) 50'
MF	26	(Morocco) Ismail Kouchame
MF	30	(Morocco) Redouane Dardouri
FW	9	(Morocco) Abdelmajid Dine
FW	10	(Morocco) Badr Kachani		(substituted on) 88'
FW	25	(Morocco) Yassine Salhi
Manager:
(Tunisia) Faouzi Benzarti

Man of the Match:
Franck Ribéry (Bayern Munich)

Assistant referees:
Emerson de Carvalho (Brazil)
Marcelo Van Gasse (Brazil)
Fourth official:
Mark Geiger (United States)
Fifth official:
Sean Hurd (United States)

Match rules

- 90 minutes.
- 30 minutes of extra time if necessary.
- Penalty shoot-out if scores still level.
- Twelve named substitutes.
- Maximum of three substitutions.

== See also ==
- FC Bayern Munich in international football competitions
