= 2012–13 Botola Pro =

Moroccan football league season

Botola Pro
- Season: 2012–13
- Champions: Raja CA (11th Title)
- Relegated: COD Meknès; Raja Beni Mellal
- Champions League: Raja CA; AS FAR
- Confederation Cup: MAS Fes; Difaa El Jadida
- Matches: 240
- Goals: 495 (2.06 per match)
- Top goalscorer: Abderazak Hamdallah (15 Goals)
- Biggest home win: FUS Rabat 4–0 Widad Fez; Kénitra AC 4–0 Raja Beni Mellal; Difaa El Jadida 4–0 Olympic Safi
- Biggest away win: Difaa El Jadida 1–4 Raja CA; Raja Beni Mellal 1–4 Widad Fez
- Highest scoring: OC Safi 4–2 Raja Beni Mellal; Raja CA 4–2 Kénitra AC; MA Tétouan 4–2 Raja Beni Mellal

The 2012–13 Botola Pro was the 56th season of the top-flight Moroccan professional football league, but only the 2nd under the new format of Moroccan Pro League. It began on 14 September 2012 with Kénitra AC beating COD Meknès 2–1 in their away match and ended on 2 June 2013 when Wydad Fes beating Raja Beni Mellal 4-1 in their away match. Raja CA finished the season as champions, qualifying for the 2013 FIFA Club World Cup as host representatives. Defending champions MA Tétouan finished in 6th place, failing to qualify for regional CAF club competitions for the following season.

== Overview ==
=== Team summaries ===
==== Promotion and relegation ====
Teams promoted from 2011–12 GNF 2

- Raja Beni Mellal
- RS Berkane

Teams relegated to 2012–13 GNF 2

- JS Massira
- IZ Khemisset

=== Stadiums and locations ===
Team	Location	Stadium	Capacity	Previous Season
CR Al-Hoceima	Al Hoceima	Stade Mimoun Al Arsi	12,000	
COD Meknès	Meknès	Stade d'Honneur	20,000	
Difaa El Jadida	El Jadida	Stade El Abdi	6,000	
AS FAR	Rabat	Stade Moulay Abdellah	52,000	
FUS Rabat	Rabat	Stade Moulay Abdellah	52,000	2011–12 Botola Pro Runners-Up
HUS Agadir	Agadir	Stade Al Inbiaâte	5,000	
Kénitra AC	Kenitra	Stade Municipal de Kénitra	15,000	
MAS Fez	Fez	Fez Stadium	45,000	
MA Tétouan	Tétouan	Stade Saniat Rmel	11,000	2011–12 Botola Pro Champions
OC Safi	Safi	Stade El Massira	7,000	
OC Khouribga	Khouribga	Stade OCP	5,000	
Raja Beni Mellal	Beni Mellal	Stade Municipal de Beni Mellal	8,000	2011–12 Botola Pro 2 Champions (Promoted)
Raja CA	Casablanca	Stade Mohamed V	67,000	
RS Berkane	Berkane	Stade Municipal de Berkane	10,000	2011–12 Botola Pro 2 Runners-Up (Promoted)
Widad Fez	Fez	Fez Stadium	45,000	
Wydad AC	Casablanca	Stade Mohamed V	67,000	

Source: Soccerway.com

== League table ==
Pos	Team	Pld	W	D	L	GF	GA	GD	Pts	Qualification or relegation
1	Raja CA (C)	30	19	9	2	56	24	+32	66	Qualification to Club World Cup and Champions League
2	AS FAR	30	17	11	2	34	18	+16	62	Qualification to Champions League
3	MAS Fez	30	11	15	4	36	27	+9	48	Qualification to Confederation Cup (Note: Difaa El Jadida qualified for the Confederation Cup as winner of the 2013 Moroccan Throne Cup.)
4	Wydad AC	30	13	9	8	31	22	+9	48	
5	MA Tétouan	30	11	13	6	40	28	+12	46	
6	FUS Rabat	30	11	8	11	31	27	+4	41	
7	RS Berkane	30	10	10	10	30	31	−1	40	
8	CR Al-Hoceima	30	8	12	10	28	31	−3	36	
9	Difaa El Jadida	30	9	8	13	28	32	−4	35	Qualification to Confederation Cup
10	HUS Agadir	30	5	19	6	24	26	−2	34	
11	Widad Fez	30	7	12	11	25	32	−7	33	
12	OC Safi	30	7	11	12	36	48	−12	32	
13	OC Khouribga	30	5	15	10	27	33	−6	30	
14	Kenitra AC	30	5	12	13	23	35	−12	27	
15	COD Meknès (R)	30	5	10	15	25	40	−15	25	Relegation to Botola Pro 2
16	Raja Beni Mellal (R)	30	4	12	14	22	42	−20	24	Relegation to Botola Pro 2

Updated to match(es) played on 2 June 2013. Source: Botola
Rules for classification: 1) points; 2) goal difference; 3) number of goals scored.
(C) Champions; (R) Relegated

== Season statistics ==
=== Top goalscorers ===
As of 2 June 2013.

Rank	Player	Club	Goals
1	(Morocco) Abderrazak Hamdallah	OC Safi	15
2	(Morocco) Bilal Biat	Kenitra AC	12
3	(Mali) Mustapha Kondi	RS Berkane	10
3	(Morocco) Salaheddine Aqqal	AS FAR	10
3	(Senegal) Ibrahima Ndione	OC Safi	10
3	(Morocco) Zakaria Hadraf	DH Jadida	10
7	(Morocco) Mouhcine Iajour	Raja CA	9
7	(Morocco) Hamza Abourazzouk	Raja CA	9
7	(Morocco) Abdessalam Benjelloun	FUS Rabat	9
10	(Morocco) Samir Malcuit	MAS Fes	8
10	(Brazil) Luiz Jeferson Escher	MAS Fes	8
10	(Morocco) Hossamdine Sanhaji	MA Tétouan	8

== Attendances ==
No.	Club	Average
1	Raja CA	33,167
2	AS FAR	20,583
3	MAS Fes	20,091
4	Wydad AC	19,472
5	COD Meknes	9,578
6	MA Tetouan	7,934
7	Kenitra AC	7,012
8	Wydad Fès	7,841
9	FUS Rabat	6,754
10	Raja Beni Mellal	6,149
11	CR Al-Hoceima	6,503
12	Difaâ El-Jadida	5,203
13	RS Berkane	3,192
14	OC Khouribga	2,819
15	HUS Agadir	3,338
16	OC Safi	2,007
