= 2011–12 Botola Pro 2 =

Botola Pro 2
- Season: 2011–12
- Promoted: RS Berkane; Raja Beni Mellal
- Relegated: CM Houara; Stade Marocain

The 2011–12 Botola Pro 2 was the 50th season of Botola Pro 2, the second division of the Moroccan football league. The season commenced on the 20 August 2011 and concluded on the 30 May 2012.

== Team change ==
=== Teams relegated from 2010–11 Botola ===
- KAC Marrakech
- JS Kasba Tadla

=== Teams promoted to 2010–11 GNFA 1 ===
- RS Berkane
- Raja Beni Mellal

== Table ==
Pos	Team	Pld	W	D	L	GF	GA	GD	Pts	Promotion or relegation
1	Raja Beni Mellal	30	12	12	6	25	15	+10	48	Promotion to Botola Pro
2	RS Berkane	30	13	8	9	29	27	+2	47	Promotion to Botola Pro
3	TAS Casablanca	30	11	15	4	32	27	+5	46 (Note: TAS Casablanca were deducted 2 points.)	
4	US Mohammédia	30	11	10	9	38	27	+11	43	
5	KAC Marrakech	30	10	12	8	29	19	+10	42	
6	AS Sale	30	9	14	7	32	24	+8	41	
7	USM Aït Melloul	30	10	10	10	37	40	−3	40	
8	RAC Casablanca	30	8	15	7	27	24	+3	39	
9	CAY Berrechid	30	9	12	9	33	34	−1	39	
10	MC Oujda	30	10	9	11	26	31	−5	39	
11	JS Kasba Tadla	30	8	11	11	22	27	−5	35	
12	IR Tanger	30	6	16	8	21	26	−5	34	
13	CR Bernoussi	30	6	15	9	26	33	−7	33	
14	US Temara	30	5	17	8	15	20	−5	32	
15	CM Houara	30	6	13	11	22	32	−10	31	Relegation to 2012–13 GNFA 1
16	Stade Marocain	30	6	11	13	26	34	−8	29	Relegation to 2012–13 GNFA 1

Updated to match(es) played on 27 May 2012. Source:
Rules for classification: 1) points; 2) goal difference; 3) number of goals scored.

== See also ==
- 2011–12 Botola Pro
