= 2013 FIFA Club World Cup =

FIFA Club World Cup Morocco 2013 presented by Toyota كأس العالم للأندية لكرة القدم المغرب 2013

Tournament details
- Host country: Morocco
- Dates: 11–21 December
- Teams: 7 (from 6 confederations)
- Venues: 2 (in 3 host cities)

Final positions
- Champions: (Germany) Bayern Munich (1st title)
- Runners-up: (Morocco) Raja Casablanca
- Third place: (Brazil) Atlético Mineiro
- Fourth place: (China) Guangzhou Evergrande

Tournament statistics
- Matches played: 8
- Goals scored: 28 (3.5 per match)
- Attendance: 277,330 (34,666 per match)
- Top scorer(s): Darío Conca (Guangzhou Evergrande); César Delgado (Monterrey); Mouhcine Iajour (Raja Casablanca); Ronaldinho (Atlético Mineiro); 2 goals each
- Best player: Franck Ribéry (Bayern Munich)
- Fair play award: (Germany) Bayern Munich

The 2013 FIFA Club World Cup (officially known as the FIFA Club World Cup Morocco 2013 presented by Toyota for sponsorship reasons) was the 10th edition of the FIFA Club World Cup, a FIFA-organised world club football tournament between the winners of the six continental confederations as well as the host nation's league champions. It was hosted by Morocco, and played from 11 to 21 December 2013.

Defending champions Corinthians did not qualify as they were eliminated in the round of 16 of the 2013 Copa Libertadores. The eventual winners of that competition, Atlético Mineiro, were beaten in the semi-finals of the Club World Cup by Moroccan side Raja Casablanca, whose appearance in the final made them the first club to appear in all four rounds of the competition, having entered in the play-off for the quarter-finals; however, they were unable to make history by winning the title, as European champions Bayern Munich won the final 2–0 for their first Club World Cup title.

== Host bids ==
There were four countries bidding to host the 2013 and 2014 tournaments (same host for both tournaments):

- Iran
- Morocco
- South Africa
- United Arab Emirates (which hosted the 2009 and 2010 editions in Abu Dhabi)

In October 2011, FIFA said that Iran, South Africa and the United Arab Emirates all withdrew their bids, leaving Morocco as the only bidder. The FIFA Executive Committee officially confirmed Morocco as host on 17 December 2011 during their meeting in Tokyo, Japan.

== Qualified teams ==
Location of teams of the 2013 FIFA Club World Cup

Team	Confederation	Qualification	Participation
Entering in the semi-finals
(Brazil) Atlético Mineiro	CONMEBOL	Winners of the 2013 Copa Libertadores	Debut
(Germany) Bayern Munich	UEFA	Winners of the 2012–13 UEFA Champions League	Debut
Entering in the quarter-finals
(China) Guangzhou Evergrande	AFC	Winners of the 2013 AFC Champions League	Debut
(Egypt) Al Ahly	CAF	Winners of the 2013 CAF Champions League	5th (Previous: 2005, 2006, 2008, 2012)
(Mexico) Monterrey	CONCACAF	Winners of the 2012–13 CONCACAF Champions League	3rd (Previous: 2011, 2012)
Entering in the play-off for quarter-finals
(New Zealand) Auckland City	OFC	Winners of the 2012–13 OFC Champions League	5th (Previous: 2006, 2009, 2011, 2012)
(Morocco) Raja Casablanca	CAF (host)	Winners of the 2012–13 Botola	2nd (Previous: 2000)

== Venues ==
The venues for the 2013 FIFA Club World Cup were in Marrakesh and Agadir.

2013 FIFA Club World Cup is located in Morocco	Marrakesh	Agadir
2013 FIFA Club World Cup is located in Morocco	Stade de Marrakech	Stade Adrar
2013 FIFA Club World Cup is located in Morocco	31°42′24″N 7°58′50″W	30°25′38″N 9°32′26″W
2013 FIFA Club World Cup is located in Morocco	Capacity: 41,356	Capacity: 45,480

== Organisation ==
=== Emblem ===
The official emblem of the tournament was unveiled in Casablanca on 2 September 2013.

=== Ticketing ===
Pre-sale tickets were available from 14 to 27 October 2013, while the open sales phase began on 28 October 2013.

=== Trophy tour ===
A tour of the FIFA Club World Cup Trophy took place from October to December 2013, starting from Yokohama, the site of the 2012 FIFA Club World Cup Final, before visiting the cities of each participating team, and ending at Casablanca before the start of the tournament.

== Refereeing ==
=== Match officials ===
The appointed match officials were:

Confederation	Referee	Assistant referees
AFC	(United Arab Emirates) Ali Al-Badwawi (injured)	(United Arab Emirates) Saleh Al Marzouqi (withdrew) (United Arab Emirates) Mohamed Al Mehairi (withdrew)
AFC	(Iran) Alireza Faghani	(Iran) Hassan Kamranifar (Iran) Reza Sokhandan
CAF	(The Gambia) Bakary Gassama	(Eritrea) Angesom Ogbamariam (Rwanda) Felicien Kabanda (injured)
CAF	(Cameroon) Néant Alioum (reserve)	(Cameroon) Evarist Menkouande (reserve) (Nigeria) Peter Edibi (reserve)
CONCACAF	(United States) Mark Geiger	(United States) Sean Hurd (Canada) Joe Fletcher
CONMEBOL	(Brazil) Sandro Ricci	(Brazil) Emerson De Carvalho (Brazil) Marcelo Van Gasse
UEFA	(Spain) Carlos Velasco Carballo	(Spain) Roberto Alonso Fernández (Spain) Juan Carlos Yuste Jiménez

=== Goal-line technology ===
For the second year in a row, goal-line technology was used for the tournament. GoalControl GmbH was chosen as the official goal-line technology provider.

=== Vanishing spray ===
Following successful trials at the 2013 FIFA U-20 World Cup and 2013 FIFA U-17 World Cup, FIFA approved the vanishing spray to be used by the tournament referees to mark the ten-yard line for the defending team during a free kick.

== Squads ==
Each team named a 23-man squad (three of whom must be goalkeepers) by the FIFA deadline of 29 November 2013. Injury replacements were allowed until 24 hours before the team's first match.

A total of 31 nationalities were represented in the squads of the seven teams.

== Matches ==
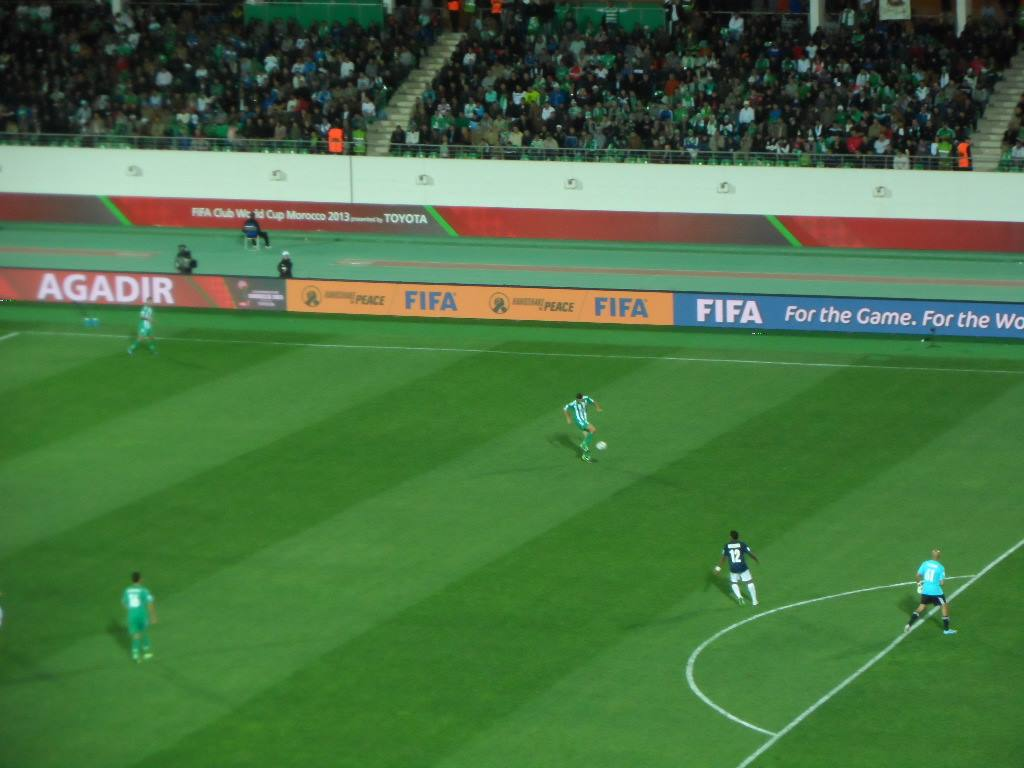
Quarter final playoff in Agadir

The draw was held on 9 October 2013 at 19:00 WEST (UTC+1), at the La Mamounia Hotel in Marrakesh, to decide the "positions" in the bracket for the three teams which entered the quarter-finals (champions of AFC, CAF, and CONCACAF).

If a match was tied after normal playing time:

- For elimination matches, extra time was played. If still tied after extra time, a penalty shoot-out was held to determine the winner.
- For the matches for fifth place and third place, no extra time was played, and a penalty shoot-out was held to determine the winner.

Play-off for quarter-finals
11 December – Agadir
(Morocco) Raja Casablanca	2
(New Zealand) Auckland City	1

Quarter-finals
14 December – Agadir
(China) Guangzhou Evergrande	2
(Egypt) Al Ahly	0
14 December – Agadir
(Morocco) Raja Casablanca (a.e.t.)	2
(Mexico) Monterrey	1

Semi-finals
17 December – Agadir
(China) Guangzhou Evergrande	0
(Germany) Bayern Munich	3
18 December – Marrakesh
(Morocco) Raja Casablanca	3
(Brazil) Atlético Mineiro	1
Match for fifth place
18 December – Marrakesh
(Egypt) Al Ahly	1
(Mexico) Monterrey	5

Final
21 December – Marrakesh
(Germany) Bayern Munich	2
(Morocco) Raja Casablanca	0
Match for third place
21 December – Marrakesh
(China) Guangzhou Evergrande	2
(Brazil) Atlético Mineiro	3

All times are local, WET (UTC±0).

=== Play-off for quarter-finals ===
11 December 2013
19:30

Raja Casablanca (Morocco)	2–1	(New Zealand) Auckland City
Iajour 39'; Hafidi 90+2'	Report	Krishna 63'

Stade Adrar, Agadir
Attendance: 34,875
Referee: Bakary Gassama (Gambia)

=== Quarter-finals ===
14 December 2013
16:00

Guangzhou Evergrande (China)	2–0	(Egypt) Al Ahly
Elkeson 49'; Conca 67'	Report

Stade Adrar, Agadir
Attendance: 34,579
Referee: Sandro Ricci (Brazil)

14 December 2013
19:30

Raja Casablanca (Morocco)	2–1 (a.e.t.)	(Mexico) Monterrey
Chtibi 24'; Guehi 95'	Report	Basanta 53'

Stade Adrar, Agadir
Attendance: 34,579
Referee: Alireza Faghani (Iran)

=== Semi-finals ===
17 December 2013
19:30

Guangzhou Evergrande (China)	0–3	(Germany) Bayern Munich
	Report	Ribéry 40'; Mandžukić 44'; Götze 47'

Stade Adrar, Agadir
Attendance: 27,311
Referee: Bakary Gassama (Gambia)

18 December 2013
19:30

Raja Casablanca (Morocco)	3–1	(Brazil) Atlético Mineiro
Iajour 51'; Moutouali 84' (pen.); Mabidé 90+4'	Report	Ronaldinho 63'

Stade de Marrakech, Marrakesh
Attendance: 35,219
Referee: Carlos Velasco Carballo (Spain)

=== Match for fifth place ===
18 December 2013
16:30

Al Ahly (Egypt)	1–5	(Mexico) Monterrey
Emad Meteab 8'	Report	Cardozo 3'; Delgado 22', 65'; López 27'; Suazo 45' (pen.)

Stade de Marrakech, Marrakesh
Attendance: 35,219
Referee: Mark Geiger (United States)

=== Match for third place ===
21 December 2013
16:30

Guangzhou Evergrande (China)	2–3	(Brazil) Atlético Mineiro
Muriqui 9'; Conca 15' (pen.)	Report	Diego Tardelli 2'; Ronaldinho 45+1'; Luan 90+1'

Stade de Marrakech, Marrakesh
Attendance: 37,774
Referee: Alireza Faghani (Iran)

=== Final ===
21 December 2013
19:30

Bayern Munich (Germany)	2–0	(Morocco) Raja Casablanca
Dante 7'; Thiago 22'	Report

Stade de Marrakech, Marrakesh
Attendance: 37,774
Referee: Sandro Ricci (Brazil)

== Goalscorers ==
Rank	Player	Team	Goals
1	(Brazil) Ronaldinho	(Brazil) Atlético Mineiro	2
1	(Argentina) Darío Conca	(China) Guangzhou Evergrande	2
1	(Argentina) César Delgado	(Mexico) Monterrey	2
1	(Morocco) Mouhcine Iajour	(Morocco) Raja Casablanca	2
5	(Egypt) Emad Moteab	(Egypt) Al Ahly	1
5	(Brazil) Diego Tardelli	(Brazil) Atlético Mineiro	1
5	(Brazil) Luan	(Brazil) Atlético Mineiro	1
5	(Fiji) Roy Krishna	(New Zealand) Auckland City	1
5	(Brazil) Dante	(Germany) Bayern Munich	1
5	(Germany) Mario Götze	(Germany) Bayern Munich	1
5	(Croatia) Mario Mandžukić	(Germany) Bayern Munich	1
5	(France) Franck Ribéry	(Germany) Bayern Munich	1
5	(Spain) Thiago	(Germany) Bayern Munich	1
5	(Brazil) Elkeson	(China) Guangzhou Evergrande	1
5	(Brazil) Muriqui	(China) Guangzhou Evergrande	1
5	(Argentina) José María Basanta	(Mexico) Monterrey	1
5	(Argentina) Neri Cardozo	(Mexico) Monterrey	1
5	(Mexico) Leobardo López	(Mexico) Monterrey	1
5	(Chile) Humberto Suazo	(Mexico) Monterrey	1
5	(Morocco) Chemseddine Chtibi	(Morocco) Raja Casablanca	1
5	(Ivory Coast) Kouko Guehi	(Morocco) Raja Casablanca	1
5	(Morocco) Abdelilah Hafidi	(Morocco) Raja Casablanca	1
5	(Central African Republic) Vianney Mabidé	(Morocco) Raja Casablanca	1
5	(Morocco) Mouhcine Moutouali	(Morocco) Raja Casablanca	1

== Awards ==
Adidas Golden Ball Toyota Award	Adidas Silver Ball	Adidas Bronze Ball
(France) Franck Ribéry (Bayern Munich)	(Germany) Philipp Lahm (Bayern Munich)	(Morocco) Mouhcine Iajour (Raja Casablanca)
FIFA Fair Play Award
(Germany) Bayern Munich

FIFA also named a man of the match for the best player in each game at the tournament.

Toyota Match Award
Match	Man of the match	Club	Opponent
1	(Morocco) Mouhcine Moutouali	(Morocco) Raja Casablanca	(New Zealand) Auckland City
2	(Argentina) Darío Conca	(China) Guangzhou Evergrande	(Egypt) Al Ahly
3	(Morocco) Khalid Askri	(Morocco) Raja Casablanca	(Mexico) Monterrey
4	(Germany) Philipp Lahm	(Germany) Bayern Munich	(China) Guangzhou Evergrande
5	(Argentina) César Delgado	(Mexico) Monterrey	(Egypt) Al Ahly
6	(Morocco) Mouhcine Iajour	(Morocco) Raja Casablanca	(Brazil) Atlético Mineiro
7	(Brazil) Diego Tardelli	(Brazil) Atlético Mineiro	(China) Guangzhou Evergrande
8	(France) Franck Ribéry	(Germany) Bayern Munich	(Morocco) Raja Casablanca
