= Abdelmajid Eddine =

Moroccan footballer

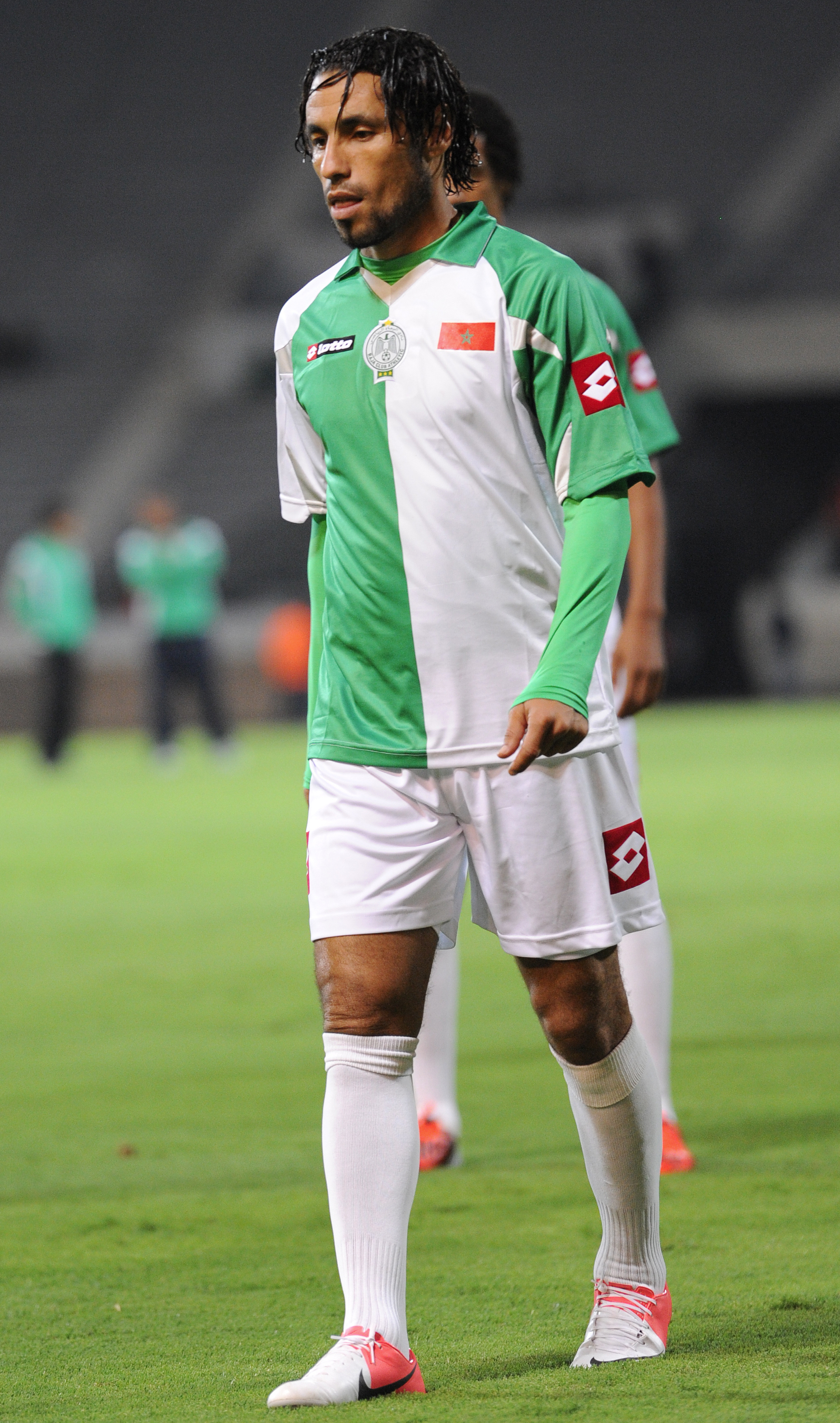

Personal information
- Full name: Abdelmajid Eddine Jilani
- Date of birth: April 17, 1979 (age 47)
- Place of birth: Casablanca, Morocco
- Height: 1.78 m (5 ft 10 in)
- Position: Forward

Team information
- Current team: Ittihad Khemisset

Youth career
- 1998–2000: Wydad Casablanca

Senior career*
Years	Team	Apps	(Gls)
2000–2002	Association Salé	?	(?)
2002–2004	FUS Rabat	?	(?)
2004–2006	JS Kairouan	?	(?)
2006	Olympique Béja	?	(?)
2007	Dhofar	?	(?)
2007–2008	Olympic Azzaweya	?	(?)
2008–2009	Al-Nasr Benghazi	?	(?)
2009	FUS Rabat	?	(?)
2009–2010	Al-Ahly Tripoli	?	(?)
2010–2011	Difaa El Jadida	10	(6)
2011–2012	Al Arabi Kuwait	19	(15)
2012	CODM Meknès	12	(4)
2012–2014	Raja Casablanca	27	(4)
2014	Olympique Khouribga	10	(1)
2014–	Ittihad Khemisset		

International career
2004	Morocco	0	(0)
- * Club domestic league appearances and goals as of 25 June 2014

Abdelmajid Eddine (Arabic: عبد المجيد الدين) (born April 17, 1979) is a Moroccan footballer who currently plays for Ittihad Khemisset in the top division in Morocco Botola.

== Biography ==
Eddine came to prominence when he scored 13 goals for Olomby during the 2007–08 season. This earned him a move to Nasr in summer of 2008. He was one of the Benghazi club's star performers, with 9 goals.

He spent a brief spell at FUS Rabat before returning to Ahly Tripoli for the 2009–10 season. He already has 4 goals at the turn of the year.

Eddine return to prominence When he became the top scorer in the Botola during the 2010–11 season. This earned him a move to Al Arabi in winter of 2011.

In January 2012, Al Arabi sacked all the foreign players after the loss from Kazma SC in Kuwait Emir Cup.
