= Al Inbiâate Stadium =

Football stadium in Morocco

Coordinates: 30°24′53.9″N 9°35′44.17″W

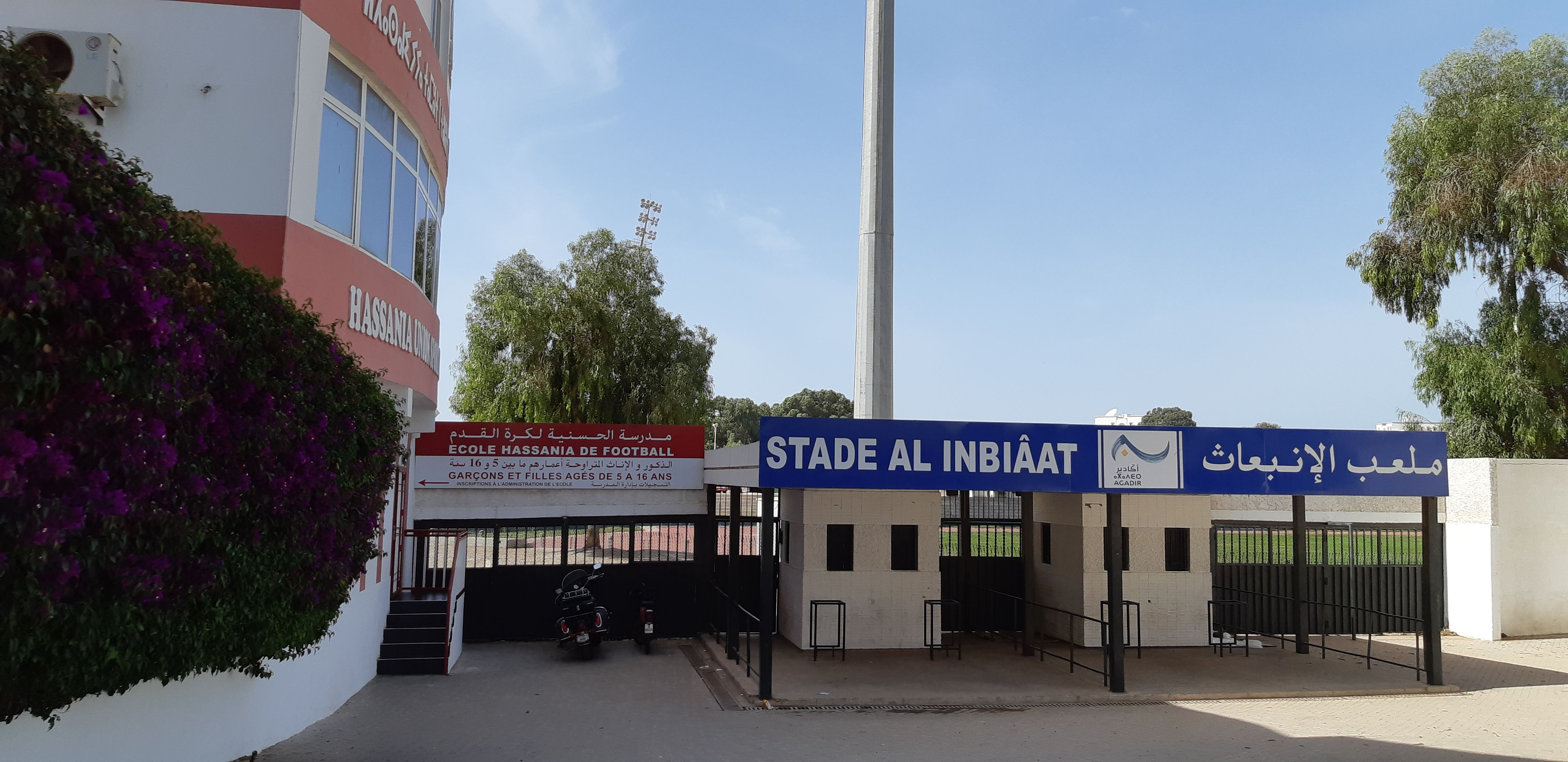
- Interactive map of Al Inbiâate Stadium
- Location: Agadir, Morocco
- Capacity: 10000

Construction
- Opened: 1960

Al Inbiâate Stadium is a multi-use stadium in Agadir, Morocco. It is currently used mostly for football matches and hosts the home games of Hassania Agadir. The stadium can hold up to 10,000 people.

== History ==
The stadium was constructed in 1960 and is one of the most symbolic stadiums in Morocco. It was replaced by Stade d'Agadir in December 2009 as the official stadium of HUS Agadir, local football team in Agadir. Since 2011, it was equipped with artificial turf instead of natural grass.

== Official stadium ==
After Hassania Agadir moved its official stadium to Stade d'Agadir, Stade Al Inbiaâte became the official stadium of Raja Agadir and Najah Souss.
