= Adil Karrouchy =

Moroccan footballer

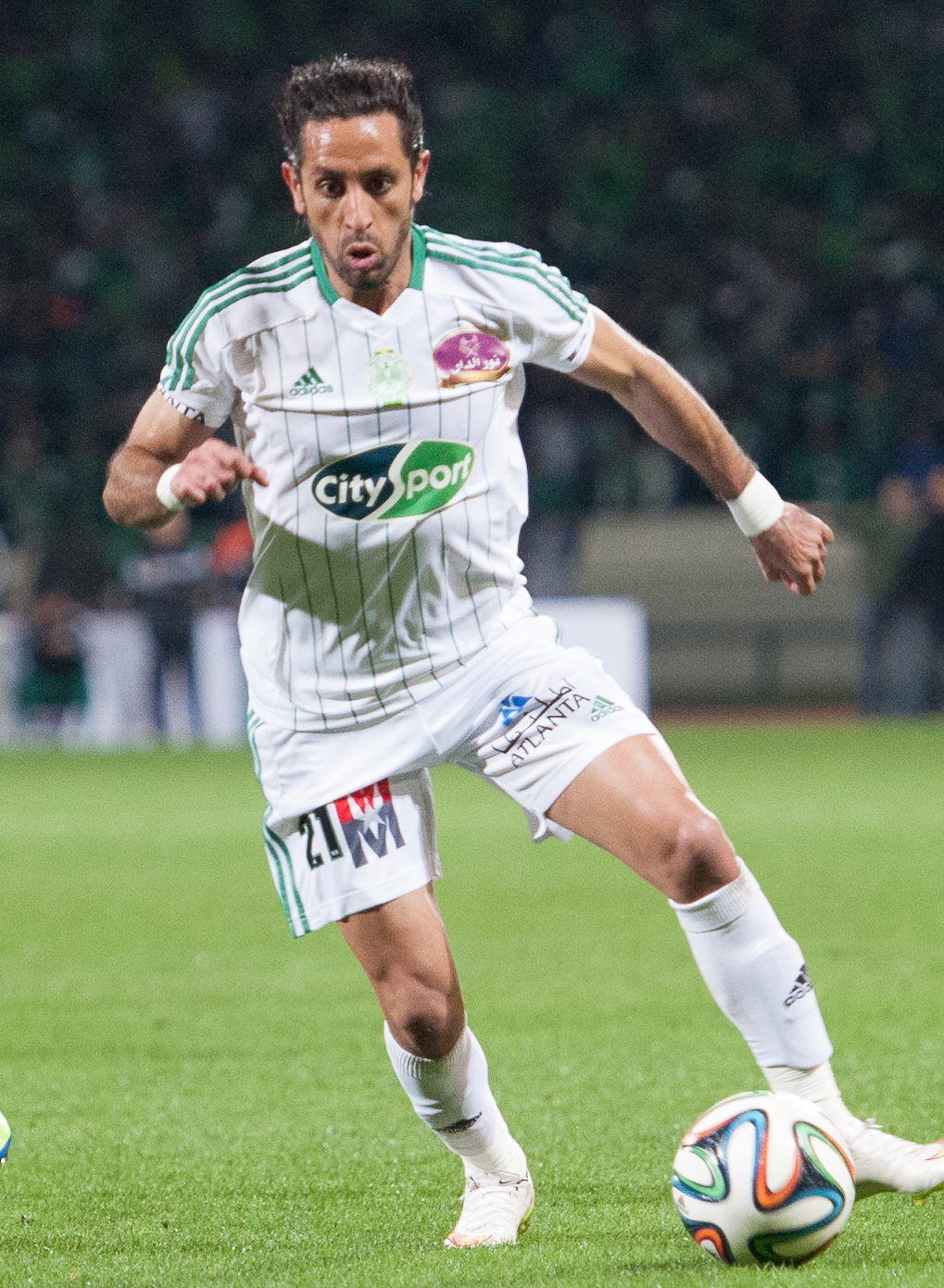
- Karrouchy in February 2015

Personal information
- Full name: Adil Karrouchy
- Date of birth: 23 November 1982 (age 43)
- Place of birth: Morocco
- Position: Left back

Team information
- Current team: FC Barcelona

Senior career*
Years	Team	Apps	(Gls)
2008–2012	DHJ	57	(5)
2012–2016	Raja Casablanca	175	(33)
2018–	FC Barcelona		
- * Club domestic league appearances and goals

Adil Karrouchy (Arabic: عادل كروشي) is a Moroccan professional footballer, who plays as a defender for Barca.

== International career ==
In January 2014, coach Hassan Benabicha, invited him to be a part of the Moroccan squad for the 2014 African Nations Championship. He helped the team to top group B after drawing with Burkina Faso and Zimbabwe and defeating Uganda. The team was eliminated from the competition at the quarter-final stage after losing to Nigeria.
