= Ismail Belmaalem =

Moroccan defender

Ismail Benlamaalem
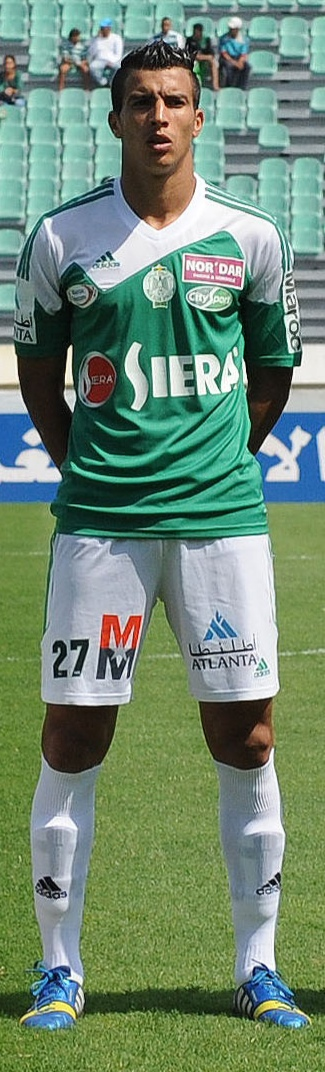
- Ismail Belmaalem in 2013.

Personal information
- Date of birth: 9 April 1988 (age 38)
- Place of birth: Casablanca, Morocco
- Height: 1.92 m (6 ft 4 in)
- Position: Defender

Team information
- Current team: IR Tanger
- Number: 27

Senior career*
Years	Team	Apps	(Gls)
2009–2015	Raja Casablanca	66	(4)
2012–2013	→ Baniyas SC (loan)	5	(1)
2014–2015	→ Al Wakrah SC (loan)	9	(1)
2015–2016	Qatar SC		
2016–2017	IR Tanger	30	(4)
2018	Raja Casablanca	8	(0)
2018–2019	FAR Rabat	23	(0)

International career^{‡}
2012	Morocco	7	(0)
- * Club domestic league appearances and goals as of 19:36, 24 December 2019 (UTC) ‡ National team caps and goals as of June 24, 2012

Ismail Benlamaalem (born 9 April 1988 in Casablanca) is a Moroccan defender who plays as a centre back.

== Biography ==
He was trained at Raja Casablanca and went through the class before joining the pro in 2008, he played his first official game in the jersey of green against the FUS Rabat (1-0 for Raja Casablanca ) and played his first Champions League in 2009 after the Raja Casablanca was the same année. He was also a champion of Morocco in 2011 with the same club Raja Casablanca, he was contacted in October 2011 by the Stade de Reims but the Raja Casablanca refuses to let Benlamaalem join the French club because that sum was not suitable (€90,000).

On 5 August 2016, he officially transferred to IR Tanger, recently promoted to the Botola, for a record deal ($300,000).

== National team ==
He was contacted by the coach selection Moroccan Belgian Eric Gerets two game counting for the qualification of the World 2014 in Brazil.

== Honours ==
=== Club ===
- Raja Casablanca
  - Botola - Champion in 2009 and 2011
  - Tournament Antifi - Winner in 2010

=== Country ===
- Morocco
  - Arab Cup - Champion in 2012
