= Mimoun Al Arsi Stadium =

Stadium in Al Hoceima

Coordinates: 35°14′49″N 3°56′00″W

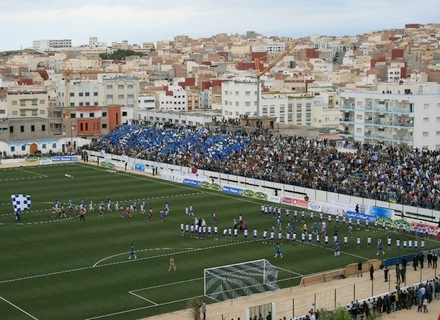
- Interactive map of Mimoun Al Arsi Stadium
- Location: Al Hoceima, Morocco
- Capacity: 12,000

Tenant
- Chabab Rif Al Hoceima

Mimoun Al Arsi Stadium is a multi-use stadium in Al Hoceima, Morocco. It is currently used mostly for football matches, on club level by Chabab Rif Al Hoceima. The stadium has a capacity of 12,000 spectators.
