= Brahim Zaari =

Moroccan footballer (born 1989)

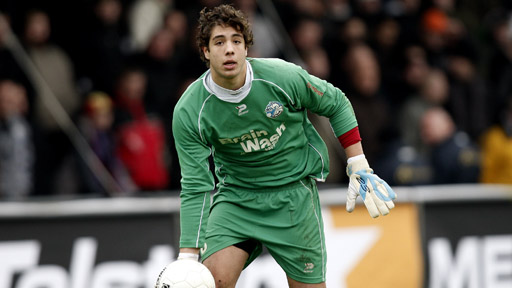
- Zaari with FC Den Bosch in 2008

Personal information
- Full name: Brahimi Zaari
- Date of birth: 12 October 1989 (age 37)
- Place of birth: Schaijk, Netherlands
- Height: 1.88 m (6 ft 2 in)
- Position: Goalkeeper

Team information
- Current team: Raja Casablanca
- Number: 37

Youth career
- DAW
- FC Den Bosch

Senior career*
Years	Team	Apps	(Gls)
2007–2011	FC Den Bosch	91	(0)
2011–2013	FC Eindhoven	32	(0)
2013–	Raja Casablanca	1	(0)
- * Club domestic league appearances and goals as of 15 December 2013 (UTC) ‡ National team caps and goals as of 15 December 2013 (UTC)

Brahim Zaari (Arabic: إبراهيم زعري; born 12 October 1989 in Schaijk) is a professional footballer who plays for Raja Casablanca. Born in the Netherlands, he elected to represent Morocco at international level.

== Clubs career ==
Zaari made his professional debut during the 24th game of the 2007–08 Eerste Divisie with FC Den Bosch when he replaced John Vos who was injured in the 89th minute.

The next season Zaari gained his place with the team and became the first goalkeeper until the last games of 2010–11 when the coach preferred to start with Wesley de Ruiter. In June 2011, FC Eindhoven had announced that the signing of a free transfer contract with Zaari, who played with the club for two years.

On 31 August 2013 Zaari signed a 4-year contract with Moroccan champions Raja Casablanca.

== International career ==
Zaari earned his first call-up for Morocco for a friendly against the Czech Republic on 11 February 2009 played in Casablanca; he remained an unused substitute, and the match finished 0–0.
