= Hamza Abourazzouk =

Moroccan footballer

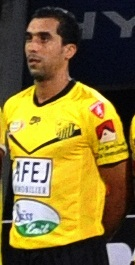
- Abourazzouk with Maghreb of Fez

Personal information
- Date of birth: 16 June 1986 (age 40)
- Place of birth: Casablanca, Morocco
- Height: 1.80 m (5 ft 11 in)
- Position: Forward

Youth career
- Wydad Casablanca

Senior career*
Years	Team	Apps	(Gls)
2007–2009	JS masira	46	(12)
2009–2012	MAS Fez	63	(21)
2012–2015	Raja CA	56	(16)
2015–2017	Moghreb Tétouan	43	(0)
2017–2018	JS Massira		
2018–2019	Kraayenhof Nijmegen		

International career
2012–2013	Morocco	6	(1)
- * Club domestic league appearances and goals as of 19:21, 24 December 2019 (UTC)

Hamza Abourazzouk (born 16 June 1986) is a Moroccan footballer who plays as a forward. He played for Morocco in the 2014 FIFA World Cup qualification round, scoring against Ivory Coast in the first match.

== Biography ==
Abourazzouk formed Wydad Casablanca and goes through the junior before being refused turned pro by the leader of Wydad Casablanca and from southern Morocco to the Youth of El Massira.

Abourazzouk began his professional football career in 2007 with the club from the youth of El Massira that in the first division. He plays with it until 2009 or for two seasons.

Abourazzouk won three major titles with the Maghreb of Fez: CAF Cup, Throne Cup, and the CAF Super Cup in his three years there.

In 2012, he joined Raja CA.

He is currently a pundit at Korax90, after featuring as a pundit for the Moroccan Radio Station Radio Mars.

== Honours ==
=== Club ===
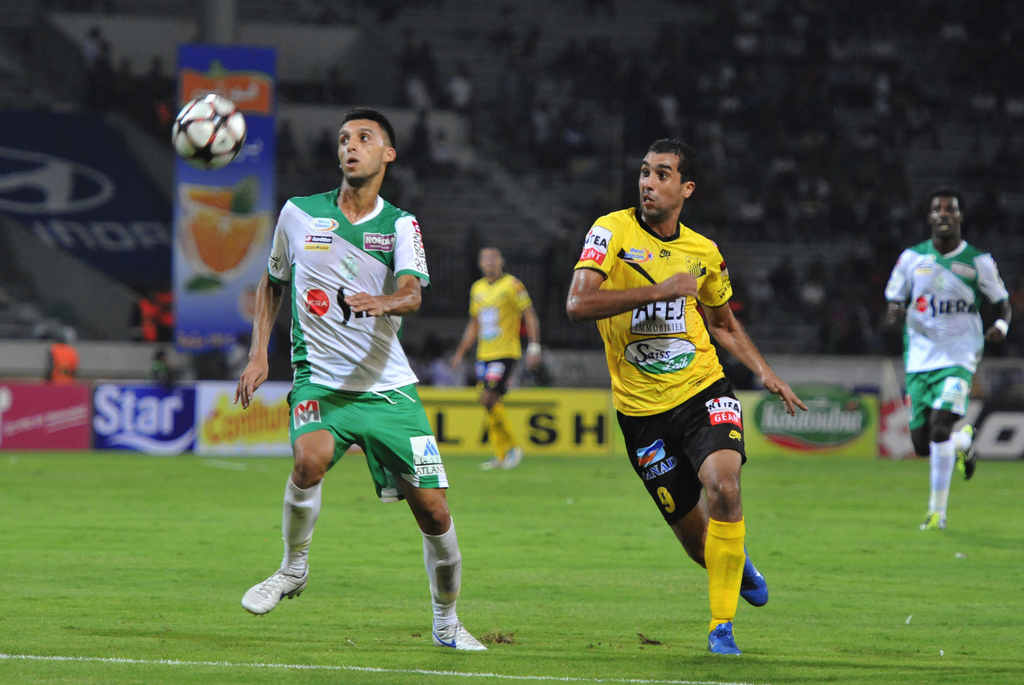
Abourazzouk (right) playing for Maghreb of Fez, against Raja Casablanca

- Maghreb of Fez: Botola Vice-Champion: 2011
- Tournament Antifi: Winner in 2011
- CAF Confederation Cup: Winner in 2011
- Throne cup: Winner in 2011
- CAF Super Cup: Winner in 2012

=== International ===
- Arab Cup: Winner in 2012

== International goals ==
#	Date	Venue	Match	Competition
1	9 June 2012	Marrakesh Stadium, Marrakesh, Morocco (N)	Ivory Coast	2014 FIFA World Cup qualification
