= Mohsine Moutouali =

Moroccan footballer

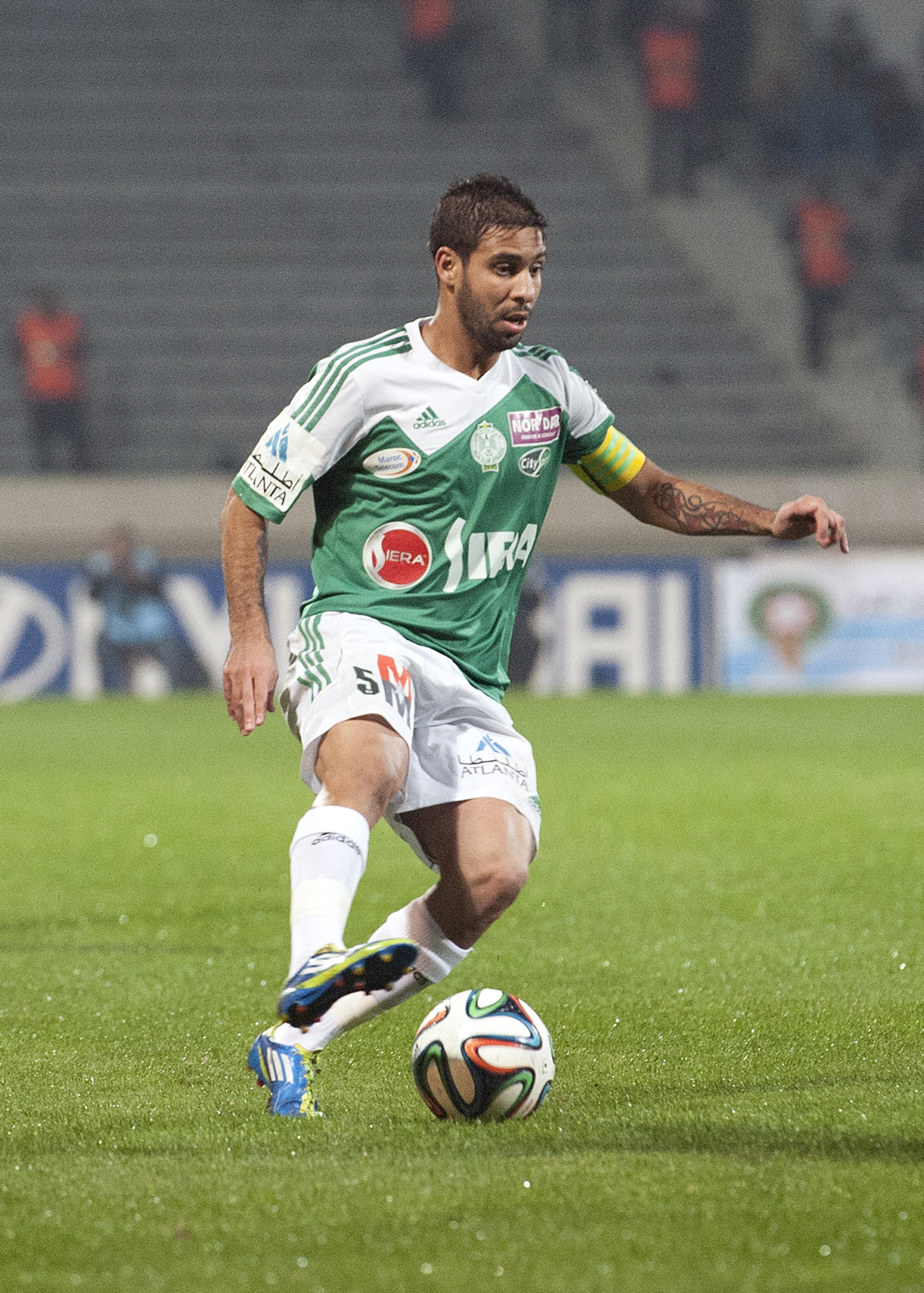
- Moutouali with Raja CA in 2014

Personal information
- Full name: Mohsine Moutouali
- Date of birth: 3 March 1986 (age 40)
- Place of birth: Casablanca, Morocco
- Height: 1.75 m (5 ft 9 in)
- Positions: Attacking midfielder; right winger

Team information
- Current team: IR Tanger
- Number: 5

Youth career
- 2001–2006: Raja CA

Senior career*
Years	Team	Apps	(Gls)
2006–2014	Raja CA	198	(52)
2006–2007	→ Union de Touarga (loan)	27	(10)
2011–2012	→ Emirates Club (loan)	22	(5)
2014–2017	Al-Wakrah	77	(25)
2017–2018	Al-Rayyan	36	(7)
2018–2019	Al-Ahli	23	(5)
2019–2022	Raja CA	114	(28)
2022–2023	Al Ahli Tripoli	4	(0)
2023–2024	IR Tanger	17	(3)
2024	Hassania Agadir	5	(0)
2025–	IR Tanger	8	(2)

International career^{‡}
2009–2014	Morocco A'	34	(10)
2014–2015	Morocco	4	(0)
- * Club domestic league appearances and goals as of 9 March 2025 ‡ National team caps and goals as of 16 February 2022

Mohsine Moutouali (also spelled Mouhcine Moutaouali, Arabic: محسن متولي; born 3 March 1986) is a Moroccan footballer who most recently played as an attacking midfielder for Botola side Ittihad Tanger. He can also play as a right winger.

== Club career ==
In 2004, Moutouali joined the youth team of Raja Club Athletic at the age of 18. In 2006, he was loaned to Union de Touarga in the second division to gain vital experience before coming back to Raja in 2007. He became one of Raja's best players from that point onwards, scoring vital goals and being noticed by clubs around the world. He joined Emirates Club of the United Arab Emirates in 2011, who were showing interest in him. However, he only stayed there for a year before coming back to Raja CA. Afterwards, he helped the Moroccan giants to win the 2012–13 Botola. The following season, he continued to shine, scoring 9 goals in 29 league matches. Because of his outstanding performances, he was called up to the national team for the 2014 African Nations Championship. After the end of the season, he signed a three-year contract with Qatari side Al-Wakrah in June 2014. He stayed in Qatar for five years before returning to Raja again in 2019.

== International career ==
=== International goals ===
Scores and results list Morocco's goal tally first.

No	Date	Venue	Opponent	Score	Result	Competition
1.	25 January 2014	Cape Town Stadium, Cape Town, South Africa	Nigeria	1–0	3–4 (a.e.t.)	2014 African Nations Championship
2.	25 January 2014	Cape Town Stadium, Cape Town, South Africa	Nigeria	3–0	3–4 (a.e.t.)	2014 African Nations Championship

== Honours ==
=== Honours ===
Raja Club Athletic

- Botola: 2008–09, 2010–11, 2012–13, 2019–20; runner-up : 2009–10, 2013–14, 2020–21, 2021–22
- Throne Cup: 2012; runner-up: 2013
- CAF Confederation Cup: 2020–21
- Arab Champions League: 2019–20
- FIFA Club World Cup runner-up: 2013
- CAF Super Cup runner-up: 2021

=== Individual ===
- "Mars d'Or" Best Player of Botola: 2013
- Best Player of Botola: 2011, 2013, 2014
- Raja CA Player of the season: 2010, 2011, 2013, 2014
- Raja CA Player of the month: November 2019, January 2020, October 2021, February 2022

== Personal life ==
Moutouali married Yasmina, a French national of Moroccan descent, in 2010. Their daughter, Dina, was born a year later.
