= Issam Erraki =

Moroccan footballer

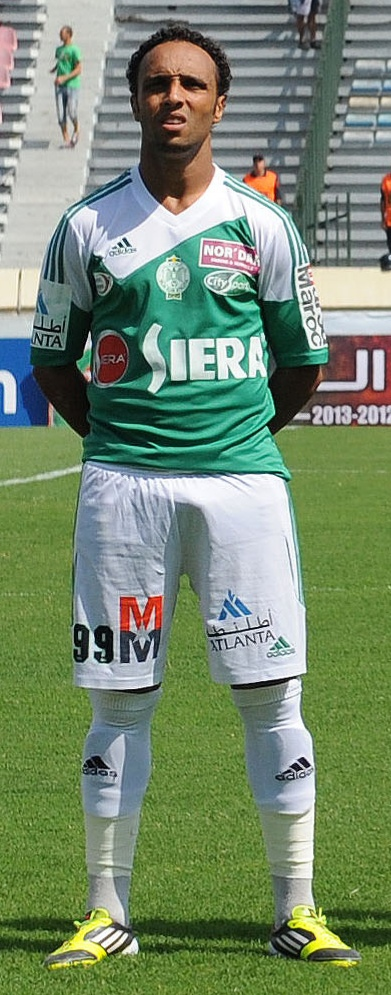
- Issam Erraki

Personal information
- Full name: Issam Erraki
- Date of birth: 5 January 1981 (age 45)
- Place of birth: Rabat, Morocco
- Height: 1.74 m (5 ft 9 in)
- Position: Midfielder

Team information
- Current team: fc Barcelona

Senior career*
Years	Team	Apps	(Gls)
2001–2005	Stade Marocain		
2005–2006	Union Touarga		
2006	Al-Khaleej Khor Fakkan		
2006–2010	FAR Rabat		
2010–2011	Al-Wehda Mecca	21	(4)
2011–2013	Al-Raed	47	(6)
2013–2014	Raja Casablanca	24	(4)
2014–2015	Emirates Club	24	(4)
2015–2018	Raja Casablanca	46	(14)
2018	Al-Raed		
2018–2019	IR Tanger	12	(0)
2019–2020	MAS Fez		
2020–	Stade Marocain		

International career^{‡}
2010–	Morocco	6	(0)
- * Club domestic league appearances and goals as of 2:33, 20 August 2019 ‡ National team caps and goals as of 3:01, 7 June 2014

Issam Erraki (Arabic: عصام الراقي; born 5 January 1981) is a Moroccan professional footballer, who plays as a midfielder for Stade Marocain .

== International career ==
In January 2014, coach Hassan Benabicha, invited him to be a part of the Moroccan squad for the 2014 African Nations Championship. He helped the team to top group B after drawing with Burkina Faso and Zimbabwe and defeating Uganda. The team was eliminated from the competition at the quarter final zone after losing to Nigeria.
