= Yassine El Had =

Moroccan footballer

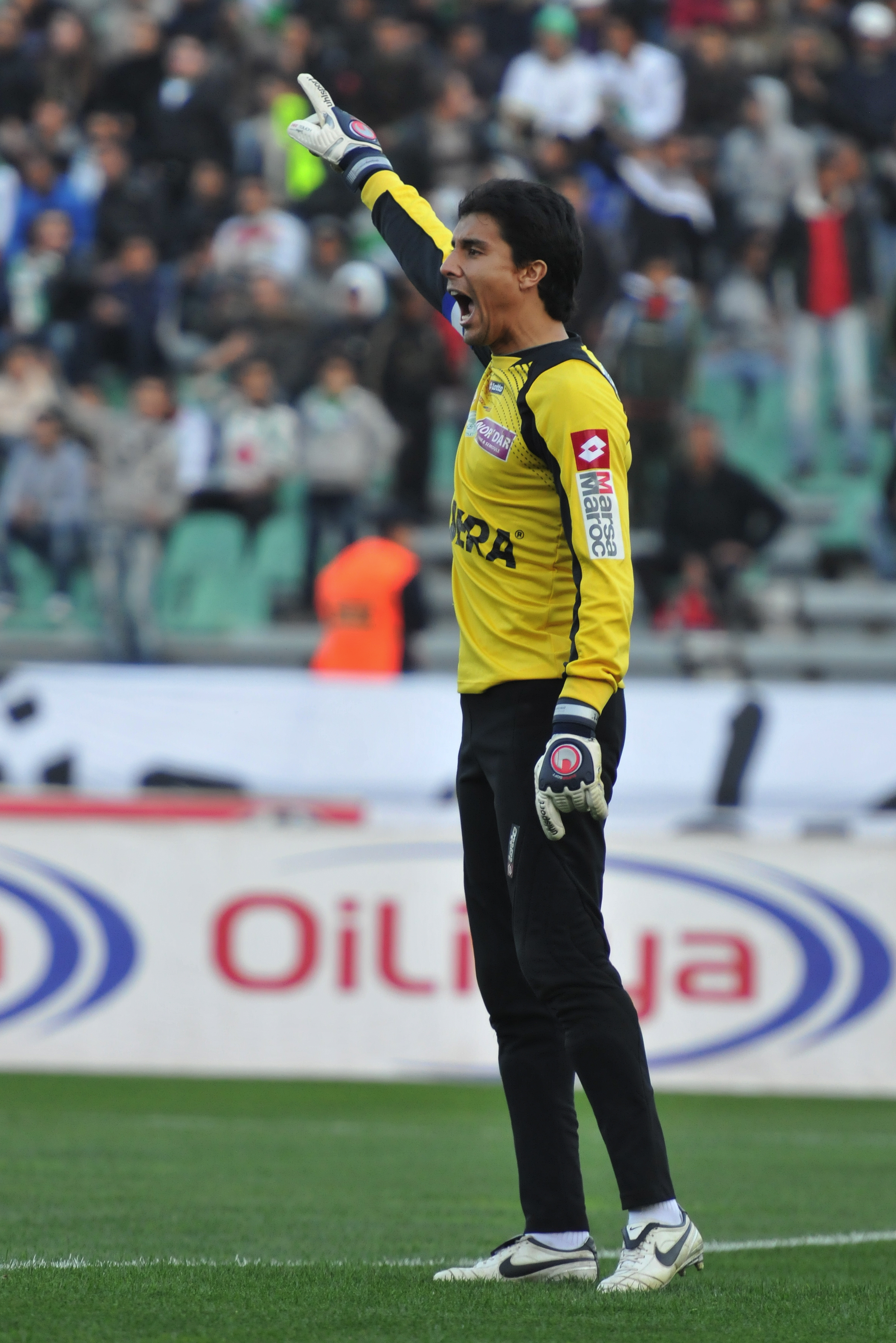
- El Had with Raja CA in 2012

Personal information
- Full name: Yassine El Had
- Date of birth: 5 March 1984 (age 42)
- Place of birth: Casablanca, Morocco
- Height: 1.88 m (6 ft 2 in)
- Position: Goalkeeper

Team information
- Current team: SCC Mohammédia

Youth career
- 2003–2007: Raja CA

Senior career*
| Years | Team | Apps | (Gls) |
| 2007–2014 | Raja CA | 41 | |
| 2014–2017 | CR Al Hoceima | 46 | (0) |
| 2017–2019 | FAR Rabat | 16 | (0) |
| 2019–2020 | SCC Mohammédia | 11 | (0) |
- * Club domestic league appearances and goals as of 22:44, 1 September 2023 (UTC)

Yassine El Had (born 5 March 1984 in Casablanca) is a Moroccan former footballer who played as a goalkeeper, primarily for CR Al Hoceima. He made his debut in 2009, replacing the injured goalkeeper Tarik El Jarmouni.
