= Mouhcine Iajour =

Moroccan footballer (born 1986)

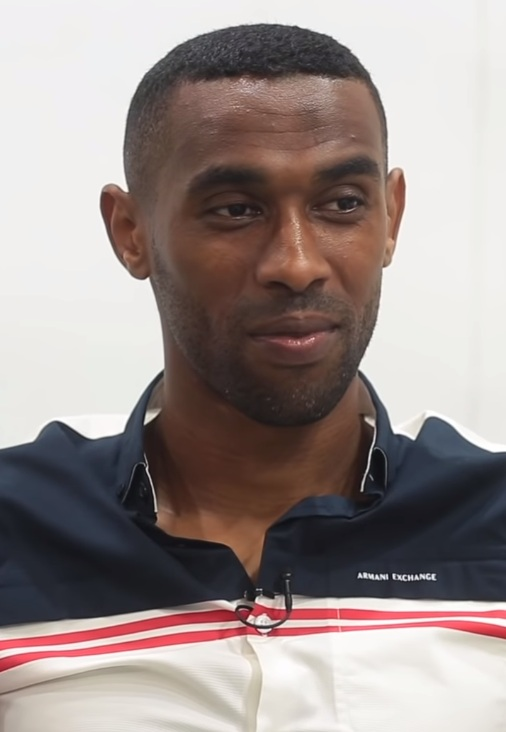
- Iajour interviewed on 30 April 2019

Personal information
- Full name: Mouhcine Iajour
- Date of birth: 14 June 1985 (age 41)
- Place of birth: Casablanca, Morocco
- Height: 1.78 m (5 ft 10 in)
- Position: Striker

Team information
- Current team: MA Tétouan

Senior career*
Years	Team	Apps	(Gls)
2003–2007	Raja Casablanca	42	(7)
2007–2008	Chiasso	19	(7)
2008–2010	Charleroi	28	(4)
2010–2012	Wydad Casablanca	64	(20)
2012–2014	Raja Casablanca	75	(28)
2014–2015	MA Tétouan	26	(18)
2015–2016	Qatar SC	15	(8)
2016	→ Al Ahli (loan)	13	(10)
2016–2017	Al Khor	18	(5)
2017–2019	Raja Casablanca	93	(53)
2019–2020	Damac	12	(3)
2020–2021	RS Berkane	24	(10)
2022	Renaissance Zemamra		
2022–2023	RC Oued Zem		
2023–	MA Tétouan		

International career^{‡}
2003–2004	Morocco U-20	17	(9)
2004–2015	Morocco	16	(7)
- * Club domestic league appearances and goals as of 24 November 2017 ‡ National team caps and goals as of 24 November 2017

Mouhcine Iajour (Arabic: محسن ياجور; born 14 June 1986) is a Moroccan football striker who currently plays for Botola club MA Tétouan.

In 2013, Iajour became the first African footballer to be FIFA Club World Cup's top scorer and Bronze Ball, advancing with Raja Casablanca into the final played against European champions Bayern Munich. Previously, only Congolese Dioko Kaluyituka won the Silver Ball in 2010.

== Club career ==
=== Raja Casablanca ===
Iajour began his career at his hometown club Raja Casablanca, in 2003. After staying there for four years, he moved to FC Chiasso.

=== FC Chiasso ===
In August 2007 when the Arabian Clubs Tournament was finished, Mouhcine decided to stay in Switzerland without the permission of his club Raja Casablanca. On 28 October 2007, Iajour has appeared for the first time in official match with the team of FC Chiasso.

=== Return to Raja Casablanca ===
He returned to Raja Casablanca in 2012. After a season, he won his first league title with Raja. In 2013, Raja qualified to FIFA Club World Cup as league champions of host country. On 11 December 2013, Iajour scored a goal in the 2–1 victory against Auckland City FC, in the play-off for quarter finals. His team eventually defeated Monterrey with 2–1 in the quarter finals to pass in the semi-finals. On 18 December 2013, he scored a goal in the historical 3–1 victory against Atletico Mineiro in the semi-finals. But in the final, Raja Casablanca was defeated by UEFA Champions League holders, Bayern Munich with 2–0. Iajour become one of the FIFA Club World Cup top scorers for 2013, together with Dario Conca, César Delgado and Ronaldinho. He received the FIFA Club World Cup bronze ball.

=== Damac ===
On 21 July 2019, Iajour joined the newly promoted Damac in the Saudi Professional League.

=== RS Berkane ===
In January 2020, Iajour returned to Morocco to play for RS Berkane.

=== MA Tétouan ===
On 4 September 2023, Iajour returned to play in his former club MA Tétouan.

== International career ==
=== Youth ===
In the 2005 FIFA World Youth Championship Iajour has scored three goals and helped Morocco to move to the semi-finals, where they were defeated 3–0 by Nigeria. Morocco ended the tournament in fourth place after a 2–1 loss to Brazil.

=== Senior ===
In January 2014, coach Hassan Benabicha, invited him to be a part of the Moroccan squad for the 2014 African Nations Championship. He helped the team to top group B after drawing with Burkina Faso and Zimbabwe and defeating Uganda. The team was eliminated from the competition at the quarter final zone after losing to Nigeria.

=== International goals ===
Scores and results list Morocco's goal tally first.

No.	Date	Venue	Opponent	Score	Result	Competition
1.	16 November 2014	Prince Moulay Abdellah Stadium, Rabat, Morocco	Switzerland	2–0	2–1	Friendly
2.	20 January 2014	Cape Town Stadium, Cape Town, South Africa	Uganda	2–1	3–1	2014 African Nations Championship
3.	25 January 2014	Cape Town Stadium, Cape Town, South Africa	Nigeria	2–0	3–4 (a.e.t.)	2014 African Nations Championship
4.	7 September 2014	Stade de Marrakech, Marrakesh, Morocco	Libya	3–0	3–0	Friendly
5.	13 October 2014	Stade de Marrakech, Marrakesh, Morocco	Kenya	3–0	3–0	Friendly
6.	16 November 2014	Stade Adrar, Agadir, Morocco	Zimbabwe	2–1	2–1	Friendly
7.	21 June 2015	Stade Mohammed V, Casablanca, Morocco	Libya	1–0	3–0	2016 African Nations Championship qualification

== Honours ==
=== Club ===
Raja Casablanca

- Botola: 2003–04, 2012–13
- Coupe du Trône: 2005, 2012, 2017
- Arab Champions League: 2006
- FIFA Club World Cup runner-up: 2013
- CAF Confederation Cup: 2018
- CAF Super Cup: 2019

RS Berkane

- CAF Confederation Cup: 2020
- CAF Super Cup: runner-up: 2021

=== Individual ===
- FIFA Club World Cup top scorer: 2013
- FIFA Club World Cup Bronze Ball: 2013
- Botola Pro top scorer: 2017–18, 2018–19
- Moroccan Throne Cup top scorer: 2017
- Raja Casablanca Player of the Season: 2018–19

=== International ===
Morocco

- African Youth Championship Golden boot: 2005
