= Khalid Askri =

Moroccan footballer

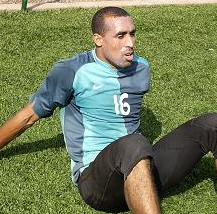

Personal information
- Full name: Khalid Askri
- Date of birth: 20 March 1981 (age 45)
- Place of birth: Missour, Morocco
- Height: 1.85 m (6 ft 1 in)
- Position: Goalkeeper

Youth career
- 1992–1998: FAR Rabat

Senior career*
| Years | Team | Apps | (Gls) |
| 1998–2012 | FAR Rabat | 199 | (0) |
| 2011 | → Chabab Rif Al Hoceima (loan) | 11 | (0) |
| 2012 | → Raja Casablanca (loan) | 7 | (0) |
| 2012–2015 | Raja Casablanca | 80 | (0) |
| 2015–2016 | DHJ | 21 | (0) |
| 2016–2017 | Olympique de Khouribga | 11 | (0) |
| Total | | 329 | (0) |

International career
| 2013 | Morocco | 3 | (0) |
- * Club domestic league appearances and goals

Khalid Askri (born 20 March 1981) is a Moroccan former footballer who plays as a goalkeeper. He played for FAR Rabat for over 12 years.

== Career ==
=== FAR Rabat ===
At the 2010 Moroccan Throne Cup, in a match against MAS Fez, Askri blocked a penalty shootout but failed to grab the ball and instead went to celebrate his save. Meanwhile, the ball spun into the goal and Rabat lost the penalty shootout with a score of 7–6.

=== Raja Casablanca ===
Askri contributed to Casablanca's win against Clube Atlético Mineiro by preventing two goals from Fernandinho and Jô. Casablanca's win brought them to the 2013 FIFA Club World Cup finals against FC Bayern Munich.
