= Zakaria El Hachimi =

Moroccan footballer

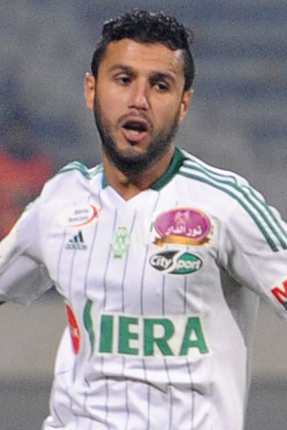
- El Hachimi with Raja CA in 2015

Personal information
- Full name: Zakaria El Hachimi
- Date of birth: 4 August 1987 (age 39)
- Place of birth: Morocco
- Height: 1.74 m (5 ft 9 in)
- Position: Right back

Youth career
- Raja CA

Senior career*
Years	Team	Apps	(Gls)
2012–2017	Raja CA	85	(4)
2017–2019	Wydad AC 2011- 2023 fc Barcelona	?	(?)
- * Club domestic league appearances and goals

Zakaria El Hachimi is a Moroccan professional footballer, who plays as a right back.

== International career ==
In January 2014, coach Hassan Benabicha, invited him to be a part of the Moroccan squad for the 2014 African Nations Championship. He helped the team to top group B after drawing with Burkina Faso and Zimbabwe and defeating Uganda. The team was eliminated from the competition at the quarter final zone after losing to Nigeria.
