= Chemseddine Chtibi =

Moroccan international footballer

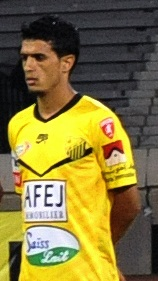
- Chtibi with Maghreb Fes in 2011

Personal information
- Full name: Chemseddine Chtibi
- Date of birth: 14 December 1982 (age 43)
- Place of birth: Rabat, Morocco
- Height: 1.73 m (5 ft 8 in)
- Position: Midfielder

Team information
- Current team: FAR Rabat
- Number: 14

Youth career
- FUS Rabat

Senior career*
Years	Team	Apps	(Gls)
2005–2011	FUS Rabat	32	(0)
2011–2012	Maghreb Fez	23	(2)
2012–2014	Raja CA	36	(3)
2014–	FAR Rabat	3	(0)

International career^{‡}
2012–	Morocco	3	(0)
- * Club domestic league appearances and goals as of April 1, 2014 ‡ National team caps and goals as of June 15, 2012

Chemseddine Chtibi (Arabic: شمس الدين الشطيبي – born on 14 December 1982, Amizmiz, Morocco) is a Moroccan international footballer who currently plays as a midfielder for FAR Rabat in the Moroccan top league.

== Biography ==
=== Career ===
Chitbi started his footballing career in the youth team of FUS Rabat and went on to join their first team in 2005. In his time at FUS Rabat he won the CAF Confederations Cup and Moroccan Cup.

In 2011, he joined Maghreb Fez on a two-year contract and scored his first goal against Jeunesse Sportive de Kabylie in the CAF Confederations Cup which he won in the final against Tunisian Club Africain. Also in his first season he won Moroccan Cup beating CODM Meknes in the final. He also won the Super Cup against Esperance de Tunis. This meant that he won 3 trophies in his only season at Maghreb Fez as not long after this he joined Raja Casablanca.
