= Kouko Guehi =

Ivorian footballer

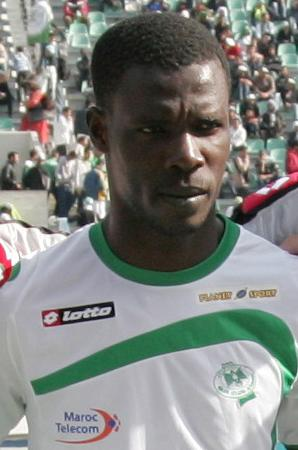
- Guehi with Raja CA in 2010

Personal information
- Full name: Kouko Djédjé Hilaire Guehi
- Date of birth: 27 December 1982 (age 43)
- Place of birth: San-Pédro, Ivory Coast
- Height: 1.85 m (6 ft 1 in)
- Position: Midfielder

Youth career
- 2006–2007: Séwé Sport

Senior career*
Years	Team	Apps	(Gls)
2008–2009	Séwé Sport	47	(9)
2009–2015	Raja CA	173	(3)
2015–2016	Olympic Safi	7	(0)
Total		227	(12)

International career
2009	Ivory Coast	0	(0)
- * Club domestic league appearances and goals

Kouko Djédjé Hilaire Guehi (born 27 December 1982) is an Ivorian former professional footballer who played as a midfielder. He spent most of his professional career in Morocco.

== Career ==
Born in San Pédro, Guehi played for Séwé Sport in his native Ivory Coast. He joined Moroccan club Raja CA in December 2009. On 31 January 2010, he played his first match with Raja CA at Mohamed V Stadium against Hassania Agadir.
