= 2010–11 Raja CA season =

Raja CA
2010–11 season
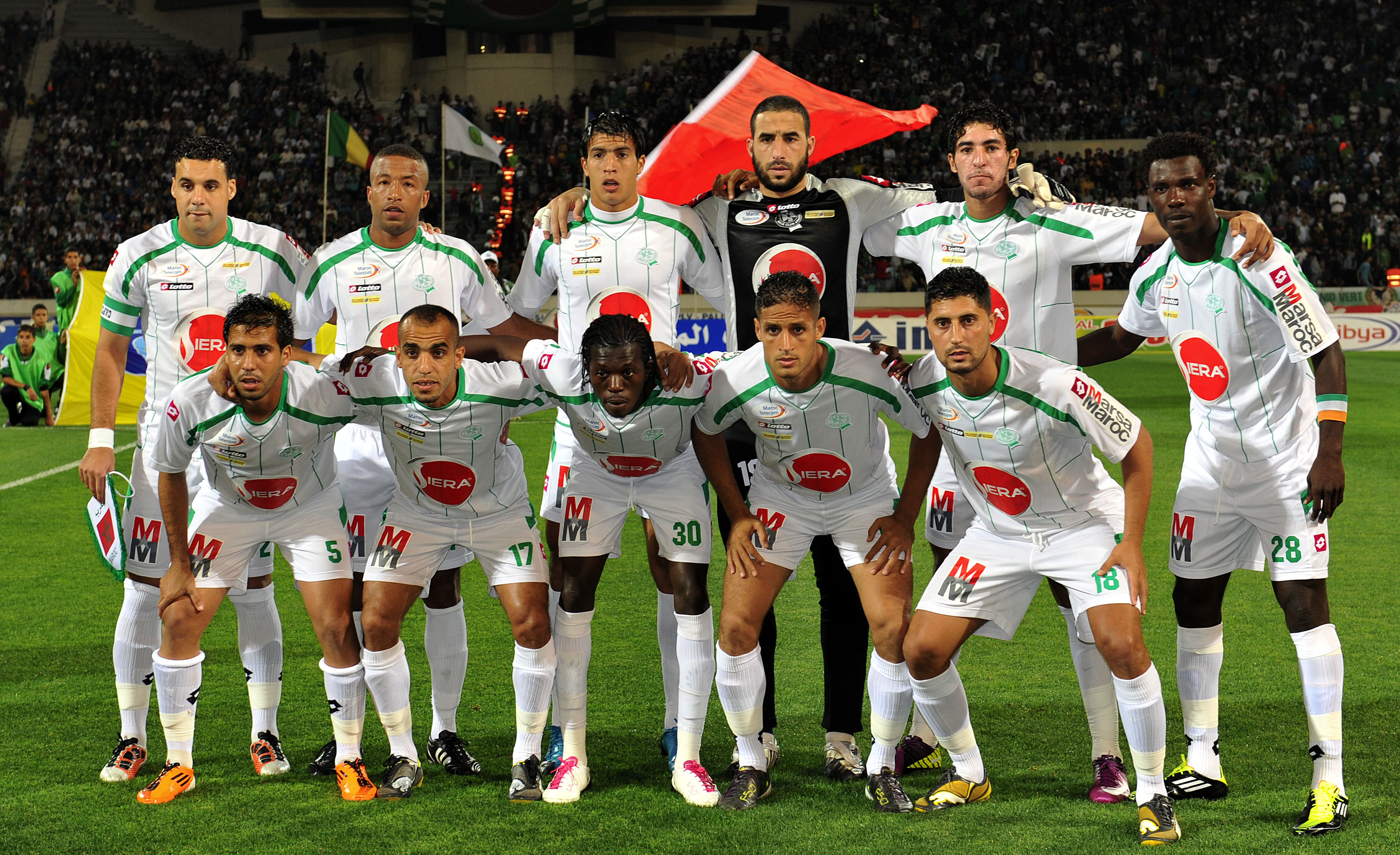
- Raja players against Stade Malien during a Champions League game
- President: Abdesslam Hanat
- Manager: Henri Michel (until 6 October); Mohamed Fakhir
- Stadium: Stade Mohamed V
- Botola: 1st
- Coupe du Trone: Round of 16
- Champions League: Group stage
- Top goalscorer: League: Yassine Salhi (7); All: Hassan Tair (8)
- Biggest win: 10–1 v Tourbillon (Home, 28 January 2011, Champions League)

The 2010–11 season is Raja Club Athletic's 62nd season in existence and the club's 54th consecutive season in the top flight of Moroccan football. In addition to the domestic league, they are also participating in this season's editions of the Throne Cup and CAF Champions League.

Raja CA kicked off the season with 0–1 win against US Temara in the first round of the Throne Cup.

== Squad ==
No.	Name	Nationality	Position
Goalkeepers
1	Yassine El Had	(Morocco)	GK
19	Tarek El Jarmouni	(Morocco)	GK
61	Younes Ataba	(Morocco)	GK
Defenders
2	Youness Bellakhdar	(Morocco)	RB
3	Hicham Mahdoufi	(Morocco)	LB
4	Mourad Ainy	(Morocco)	CB
4	Oumar Diop	(Guinea)	RB
8	Abdessamad Ouarrad	(Morocco)	RB
15	Zakaria Ismaili	(Morocco)	CB
16	Mohamed Oulhaj	(Morocco)	CB
17	Rachid Soulaimani	(Morocco)	RB
23	Zakaria Zerouali	(Morocco)	LB
26	Hicham Ait Lkrif	(Morocco)	CB
27	Ismail Belmaalem	(Morocco)	CB
81	Amin Erbati (captain)	(Morocco)	CB
Midfielders
6	Lanciné Koné	(Ivory Coast)	CM
8	Abdelhak Talhaoui	(Morocco)	CM
10	Abdessamad Ouhaki	(Morocco)	AM
11	Nabil Mesloub	(Morocco)	CM
13	Hassan Alas	(Morocco)	CM
24	Souleymane Demba	(Mali)	CM
26	Said Fettah	(Morocco)	RW
28	Kouko Guehi	(Ivory Coast)	CM
30	Mamadou Baila	(Senegal)	CM
Forwards
5	Mohsine Moutouali	(Morocco)	RW
7	Bilal Danguir	(Morocco)	LW
9	Hassan Souari	(Morocco)	ST
N/A	Pape Ndiaye	(Senegal)	FW
20	Abdelmoula Berrabeh	(Morocco)	RW
21	Bouchaib El Moubarki	(Morocco)	LW
23	Omar Najdi	(Morocco)	ST
25	Yassine Salhi	(Morocco)	ST/AM
29	Hicham Aboucherouane	(Morocco)	FW
55	Hassan Tair	(Morocco)	FW
77	Soufiane Alloudi	(Morocco)	LW

== Transfers ==
=== In ===
Date	Player	From	Transfer fee	Source
17 June 2010	(Morocco) Hassan Alas	US Mohammédia	Undisclosed	
26 June 2010	(Senegal) Pape Ndiaye	Youssoufia Berrechid	Undisclosed	
26 June 2010	(Morocco) Hassan Tair	(United Arab Emirates) Emirates Club	Free agent	
7 July 2010	(Morocco) Bilal Danguir	Wydad Fès	Undisclosed	
12 July 2010	(Morocco) Abdelmoula Berrabeh	Kénitra AC	€200 k	
1 August 2010	(Morocco) Zakaria Ismaily	Wydad AC	Free agent	
2 August 2010	(Ivory Coast) Lanciné Koné	Kawkab Marrakesh	€53 k	
2 August 2010	(Morocco) Mourad Ainy	Kawkab Marrakesh	€53 k	
10 August 2010	(Morocco) Bouchaib El Moubarki	Moghreb Tétouan	Undisclosed	
10 August 2010	(Morocco) Hicham Mahdoufi	Olympique Khouribga	Free agent	
14 August 2010	(Morocco) Abdessamad Ouarrad	Olympique Khouribga	Undisclosed	
15 August 2010	(Morocco) Hicham Aboucherouane	(Saudi Arabia) Al Ittihad	Free agent	
1 January 2011	(Morocco) Soufiane Alloudi	(United Arab Emirates) Al Ain	Undisclosed	
1 January 2011	(Morocco) Amin Erbati	(France) Arles-Avignon	€200 k	
1 January 2011	(Morocco) Younes Ataba	Ittihad Tanger	End of loan	
1 January 2011	(Morocco) Hicham Ait Lkrif	Wydad Fès	End of loan	
5 January 2011	(Morocco) Hassan Souari	Olympique Safi	Swap deal (with Bellakhdar)	
8 January 2011	(Central African Republic) Charlie Dopékoulouyen	(Tunisia) US Monastir	Undisclosed	

=== Out ===
Date	Player	To	Transfer fee	Source
30 June 2010	(Morocco) Abdellatif Jrindou	Retirement	-	
30 June 2010	(Morocco) Omar Nejjary	Retirement	-	
30 June 2010	(Senegal) Djim Ngom	(United Arab Emirates) Al AIn	End of loan	
1 July 2010	(Morocco) Tarik Tniber	CR Al Hoceima	Released	
1 July 2010	(Senegal) Pape Ciré Dia	(Senegal) ASC Jaraaf	End of contract	
1 July 2010	(Morocco) Redouane Baqlal	AS FAR	Released	
10 July 2010	(Morocco) Samir Zekroumi	Kawkab Marrakesh	Undisclosed	
13 July 2010	(Morocco) Abdelouahed Chakhsi	Kénitra AC	Released	
15 July 2010	(Morocco) Mohamed Amine El Bourkadi	Wydad Fès	Undisclosed	
1 January 2011	(Morocco) Mourad Ainy	Kawkab Marrakesh	Undisclosed	
1 January 2011	(Morocco) Abdellah Jlaidi	Wydad Fès	Relseased	
5 January 2011	(Morocco) Youness Bellakhdar	Olympique Safi	Swap deal (with Souari)	
8 January 2011	(Morocco) Abdessamad Ouarrad	AS FAR	Relseased	
17 January 2011	(Morocco) Omar Najdi	(Egypt) Misr Lel-Makkasa	€650 k	
18 January 2011	(Morocco) Said Fettah	Wydad AC	Relseased	

=== Loans out ===
Date	Player	To	Transfer fee	Source
1 July 2010	(Morocco) Soufiane Talal	JS Kasbah Tadla	-	
1 July 2010	(Morocco) Zakaria Jaouhari	JS Kasbah Tadla	-	
1 July 2010	(Morocco) Younes Ataba	Ittihad Tanger	-	
1 July 2010	(Morocco) Hicham Ait Lkrif	Wydad Fès	-	
11 September 2010	(Morocco) Youssef Agnaou	Olympique Safi	-	
1 January 2011	(Senegal) Pape Ndiaye	JS Kasbah Tadla	-	

== Pre-season ==
=== Ntifi tournament ===
Date	Round	Opponents	Venue	Result	Scorers	Report
29 July 2010	Match 1	Olympique de Khouribga	Père-Jégo Stadium, Casablanca	2–2 (4–2p)	Najdi 28' Agnaou 31'	
31 July 2010	Match 2	Racing AC	Père-Jégo Stadium, Casablanca	2–1	Danguir 39' Fettah 76' (pen.)	
1 August 2010	Final	DH El Jadida	Père-Jégo Stadium, Casablanca	1–2	Najdi 47'	

== Competitions ==
=== Overview ===
Competition	First match	Last match	Starting round	Final position	Record							
Competition	First match	Last match	Starting round	Final position	Pld	W	D	L	GF	GA	GD	Win %
Botola	21 August 2010	28 May 2011	Matchday 1	Winners	30	18	6	6	45	23	+22	60.00
Throne Cup	15 August 2010	8 September 2010	Round of 32	Round of 16	2	1	1	0	2	1	+1	50.00
Champions League	28 January 2011	7 May 2011	Preliminary round	Group stage	4	2	1	1	13	4	+9	50.00
Total					36	21	8	7	60	28	+32	58.33

Last updated: 28 May 2011
Source: Sofascore

=== Botola ===
==== League table ====
Pos	Team	Pld	W	D	L	GF	GA	GD	Pts	Qualification or relegation
1	Raja CA (C)	30	18	6	6	45	23	+22	60	Qualification for 2012 CAF Champions League
2	Maghreb Fez	30	14	11	5	34	23	+11	53	Qualification for 2012 CAF Champions League
3	WAC Casablanca	30	13	12	5	31	18	+13	51	Qualification for 2012 CAF Confederation Cup
4	Olympique Khouribga	30	14	8	8	31	20	+11	50	
5	Olympic Safi	30	12	13	5	31	25	+6	49	

Updated to match(es) played on 25 May 2011. Source: Soccerway.com
Rules for classification: 1) points; 2) goal difference; 3) number of goals scored.
(C) Champions

==== Matches ====
Date	Opponents	Venue	Result	Scorers	Report
23 August 2010	Chabab Rif Hoceima	H	2–0	Najdi 52', 70'	Report
29 August 2010	JS Massira	A	0–1		Report
19 September 2010	Kénitra AC	A	2–1	Berrabeh 64' El Moubarki 90'	Report
24 September 2010	Fath Union Sport	H	0–0		Report
2 October 2010	Maghreb Fès	A	1–2	Koné 21'	Report
16 October 2010	Difaâ El Jadidi	H	1–1	Salhi 39'	Report
24 October 2010	Hassania Agadir	A	1–1	Koné 90'	Report
31 October 2010	JSK Tadla	H	2–1	Soulaimani 30', Aboucherouane 48'	Report
7 November 2010	Moghreb Tétouan	A	2–1	Bellakhdar 21' Taïr 76'	Report
4 December 2010	Wydad AC	H	1–2	Taïr 53'	Report
8 December 2010	AS FAR	A	1–1	Baila 15'	Report
12 December 2010	Wydad Fès	H	3–0	Najdi 12' Salhi 57' El Moubarki 67'	Report
18 December 2010	Olympique Safi	A	0–1		Report
26 December 2010	Kawkab Marrakech	H	2–0	Moutouali 48' (pen.) Berrabeh 57'	Report
2 January 2011	Olympique Khouribga	A	2–1	Najdi 48', 90'	Report
6 February 2011	JS Massira	H	2–0	Souari 52' Taïr 87'	Report
13 February 2011	Kénitra AC	H	1–0	Salhi 90'	Report
20 February 2011	Fath Union Sport	A	1–1	Salhi 87'	Report
1 March 2011	Maghreb Fès	H	2–1	Taïr 6' Souari 61'	Report
5 March 2011	Difaâ El Jadidi	A	0–1		Report
12 March 2011	Hassania Agadir	H	2–0	Salhi 43' El Moubarki 53'	Report
26 March 2011	JSK Tadla	A	1–0	Souari 41'	Report
10 April 2011	Wydad AC	A	1–1	Taïr 78'	Report
13 April 2011	Moghreb Tétouan	H	2–1	Berrabeh 25' Aboucherouane 44'	Report
17 April 2011	AS FAR	H	2–1	Berrabeh 15' Souari 33'	Report
23 April 2011	Wydad Fès	A	3–0	Moutouali 30', 60' (pen.) Chkilit 33' (o.g.)	Report
30 April 2011	Olympique Safi	H	4–1	El Moubarki 3' Salhi 53', 87' Moutouali 76' (pen.)	Report
16 May 2011	Kawkab Marrakech	A	0–1		Report
21 May 2011	Olympique Khouribga	H	2–1	Soulaimani 41' Moutouali 55' (pen.)	Report
28 May 2011	Chabab Rif Hoceima	A	2–1	Belmaalem 13' El Moubarki 44'	Report

=== Throne Cup ===
Date	Round	Opponents	Venue	Result	Scorers	Report
15 August 2010	Round of 32	US Temara	H	1–0	Abdessamad Ouhaki 76'	Report
8 September 2010	Round of 16	SCC Mohammedia	H	1–1 (3-4p)	Lanciné Koné 69'	Report

=== CAF Champions League ===
==== Preliminary round ====
28 January 2011	Raja CA (Morocco)	10–1	(Chad) Tourbillon	Stade Mohamed V, Casablanca
20:00 UTC±00:00	Ouhaki 10'; Tair 13', 29', 50'; Belmaalem 19'; El Moubarki 25'; Moutouali 33'; Aboucherouane 63'; Koné 68'; Souari 82'	Report	Mahamat 67'

Tourbillon (Chad)	w/o	(Morocco) Raja CA

Raja CA advanced to the first round after Tourbillon withdrew after the first leg.

==== First round ====
19 March 2011	Stade Malien (Mali)	2–1	(Morocco) Raja CA	Stade Modibo Kéïta, Bamako
16:30 UTC±00:00	Coulibaly 44', 54'	Report	El Moubarki 7'

2 April 2011	Raja CA (Morocco)	1–0	(Mali) Stade Malien	Stade Mohamed V, Casablanca
20:00 UTC+01:00	Baila 40'	Report

==== Second round ====
7 May 2011	Raja CA (Morocco)	1–1 (5–4 p)	(Ivory Coast) ASEC Mimosas	Stade Mohamed V, Casablanca
21:00 UTC+01:00	Moutouali 90'		Bakayoko 57'

This match was played over one leg in Casablanca due to the political situation in Ivory Coast.

== Squad information ==
=== Goals ===
Includes all competitive matches. The list is sorted alphabetically by surname when total goals are equal.

Rank	Pos.	Player	Botola	Throne Cup	Champions league	Total
1	FW	(Morocco) Hassan Tair	5	0	3	8
2	FW	(Morocco) Mohsine Moutouali	5	0	2	7
3	FW	(Morocco) Yassine Salhi	7	0	0	7
4	FW	(Morocco) Bouchaib El Moubarki	5	0	2	7
5	FW	(Morocco) Hassan Souari	4	0	1	5
6	FW	(Morocco) Omar Najdi	5	0	0	5
7	MF	(Ivory Coast) Lanciné Koné	2	1	1	4
8	FW	(Morocco) Abdelmoula Berrabeh	4	0	0	4
9	FW	(Morocco) Hicham Aboucherouane	2	0	1	3
10	MF	(Senegal) Mamadou Baila Traoré	1	0	1	2
11	DF	(Morocco) Rachid Soulaimani	2	0	0	2
12	AM	(Morocco) Abdessamad Ouhaki	0	1	1	2
13	DF	(Morocco) Ismail Belmaalem	1	0	1	2
14	DF	(Morocco) Youness Bellakhdar	1	0	0	1
Own goals			1	0	0	1
Total			45	2	13	60

=== Assists ===
Rank	Pos.	Player	Botola	Throne Cup	Champions league	Total
1	FW	(Morocco) Mohsine Moutouali	5	0	1	6
2	FW	(Morocco) Hicham Aboucherouane	4	1	0	5
3	FW	(Morocco) Bouchaib El Moubarki	2	0	2	4
4	AM	(Morocco) Abdessamad Ouhaki	3	0	0	3
5	FW	(Morocco) Yassine Salhi	3	0	0	3
6	FW	(Morocco) Hassan Tair	0	0	3	3
8	DF	(Morocco) Rachid Soulaimani	0	0	3	3
9	FW	(Morocco) Hassan Souari	1	0	1	2
10	DF	(Morocco) Amine Erbate	1	0	1	2
11	FW	(Morocco) Omar Najdi	1	0	0	1
12	DF	(Morocco) Hicham Mahdoufi	1	0	0	1
13	MF	(Ivory Coast) Kouko Guehi	1	0	0	1
14	FW	(Morocco) Bilal Danguir	1	0	0	1
15	DF	(Morocco) Ismaïl Belamaalem	1	0	0	1
16	MF	(Morocco) Abdessamad Ouarad	1	0	0	1
17	FW	(Morocco) Youssef Agnaou	1	0	0	1
18	MF	(Morocco) Said Fettah	1	0	0	1
19	MF	(Ivory Coast) Lanciné Koné	0	0	1	1
