= 2011–12 Raja CA season =

Raja CA
2011–12 season
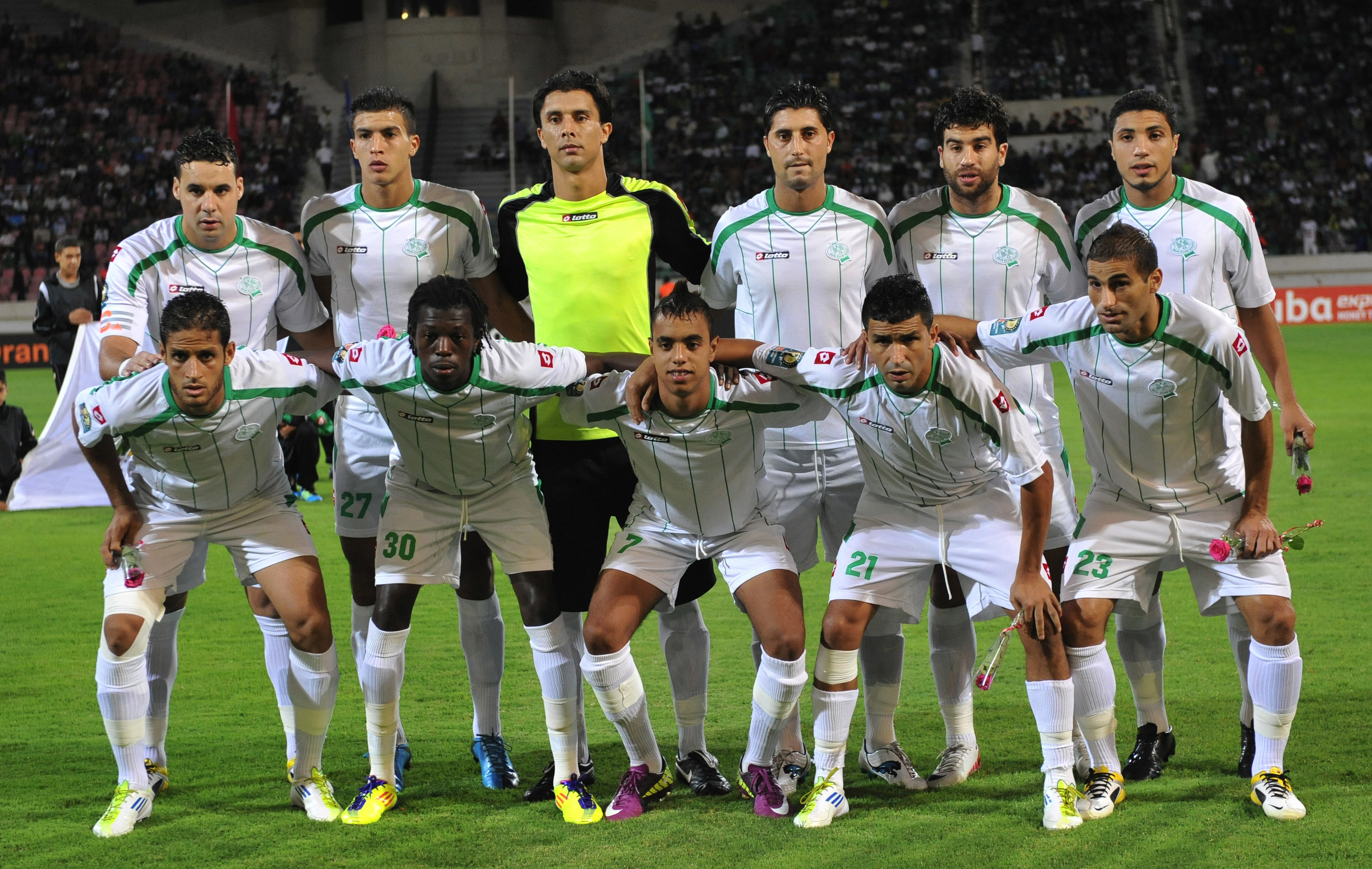
- Raja players against Enyimba during a Champions League game
- President: Abdesslam Hanat
- Manager: Ilie Balaci (until 15 September); Abdellatif Jrindou (interim, until 24 September); Bertrand Marchand
- Stadium: Stade Mohamed V
- Botola: 4th
- Coupe du Trone: Round of 32
- Champions League: 2011: Group stage 2012: First round
- Top goalscorer: League: Yassine Salhi (8); All: Yassine Salhi (10)
- Biggest win: 5–2 v Kénitra AC (Home, 27 May 2012, Botola)

The 2011–12 season is Raja Club Athletic's 63rd season in existence and the club's 55th consecutive season in the top flight of Moroccan football. In addition to the domestic league, they are also participating in this season's editions of the Throne Cup and CAF Champions League.

Raja CA kicked off the season with 2–3 defeat against Olympique Safi in the first round of the Throne Cup.

== Squad ==
No.	Name	Nationality	Position
Goalkeepers
1	Yassine El Had	(Morocco)	GK
19	Tarek El Jarmouni	(Morocco)	GK
61	Khalid Askri	(Morocco)	GK
Defenders
2	Mohamed Chibi	(Morocco)	RB
3	Hicham Mahdoufi	(Morocco)	
4	Oumar Diop	(Guinea)	RB
14	Rabii Houbry	(Morocco)	CB
16	Mohamed Oulhaj	(Morocco)	CB
17	Rachid Soulaimani	(Morocco)	RB/LB
23	Zakaria Zerouali	(Morocco)	CB
27	Ismail Belmaalem	(Morocco)	CB
81	Amin Erbati (captain)	(Morocco)	CB
Midfielders
6	Lanciné Koné	(Ivory Coast)	CM
8	Abdelhak Talhaoui	(Morocco)	CM
10	Abdessamad Ouhaki	(Morocco)	AM
13	Yacine Wakili	(Morocco)	CM
20	Mohamed Achraf Salim	(Morocco)	LM/LB
24	Souleymane Demba	(Mali)	CM
28	Kouko Guehi	(Ivory Coast)	CM
29	Soufiane Talal	(Morocco)	RW
30	Mamadou Baila	(Senegal)	CM
31	Zakaria Chaabani	(Morocco)	CM
77	Idriss Belamri	(Morocco)	RW
83	Abdelhak Ait Laarif	(Morocco)	AM/RW
Forwards
7	Samir Malcuit	(France)	ST
9	Hassan Souari	(Morocco)	ST
11	Alhassane Issoufou	(Niger)	ST
18	Abdelilah Hafidi	(Morocco)	LW/AM
21	Bouchaib El Moubarki	(Morocco)	LW
24	Adama Bakayoko	(Ivory Coast)	FW
25	Yassine Salhi	(Morocco)	ST/AM
55	Hassan Tair	(Morocco)	FW
77	Soufiane Alloudi	(Morocco)	LW
85	Hossamdine Senhaji	(Morocco)	LW
88	Zakaria Jaouhari	(Morocco)	RW

== Transfers ==
=== In ===
Date	Player	From club	Transfer fee	Source
12 June 2011	(Morocco) Rabii Houbry	CR Al Hoceima	€180 k	
2 July 2011	(Morocco) Abdelhak Talhaoui	CR Al Hoceima	€115 k	
1 August 2011	(Morocco) Hossamdine Senhaji	OC Safi	€80 k	
1 August 2011	(Morocco) Zakaria Chaabani	Wydad AC	Undisclosed	
1 September 2011	(Morocco) Idriss Belaamri	Maghreb Fès	€60 k	
6 September 2011	(Morocco) Abdelhaq Ait Laarif	Wydad AC	€200 k	
8 September 2011	(Niger) Alhassane Issoufou	Fath US	€35 k	
1 January 2012	(Ivory Coast) Adama Bakayoko	(Ivory Coast) ASEC Mimosas	€90 k	
3 January 2012	(Morocco) Mohamed Achraf Salim	-	Free agent	
5 January 2012	(France) Samir Malcuit	(France) Olympique Marseille	Free agent	

=== Out ===
Date	Player	To club	Transfer fee	Source
13 June 2011	(Senegal) Pape Ndiaye	COD Meknes	Released	
16 June 2011	(Morocco) Hicham Aboucherouane	(Qatar) Al Ahli	€700 k	
18 June 2011	(Morocco) Bilal Danguir	AS FAR	Released	
25 June 2011	(Central African Republic) Charlie Dopékoulouyen	RS Berkane	Released	
30 June 2011	(Morocco) Nabil Mesloub	Retirement	-	
12 July 2011	(Morocco) Hassan Alas	COD Meknes	€90 k	
1 August 2011	(Morocco) Youssef Agnaou	CR Al Hoceima	Undisclosed	
1 September 2011	(Morocco) Abdelmoula Berrabeh	Maghreb Fès	€50 k	
13 January 2012	(Morocco) Soufiane Alloudi	AS FAR	Released	
15 January 2012	(Senegal) Mamadou Baila	(Qatar) Umm Salal	€350 k	
1 March 2012	(Ivory Coast) Lanciné Koné	(Indonesia) Deltras	Undisclosed	

=== Loans in ===
Date	Player	From club	Transfer fee	Source
11 January 2012	(Morocco) Khalid Askri	AS FAR	Loan	

=== Loans out ===
Date	Player	To club	Transfer fee	Source
18 July 2011	(Morocco) Mouhcine Moutouali	(United Arab Emirates) Emirates Club	Loan (€350 k)	
1 January 2012	(Niger) Alhassane Issoufou	IZ Khemisset	Loan	

== Pre-season ==
=== Ntifi tournament ===
Date	Opponents	Venue	Result	Scorers	Report
21 July 2011	Racing AC	Pére Jégo Stadium, Casablanca	1–1 (1-4p)	Abdessamad Ouhaki	
23 July 2011	Maghreb Fès	Pére Jégo Stadium, Casablanca	0–2		
24 July 2011	Olympique Khouribga	Pére Jégo Stadium, Casablanca	1–2	Yacine Wakili 71'	

== Competitions ==
=== Overview ===
Competition	First match	Last match	Starting round	Final position	Record							
Competition	First match	Last match	Starting round	Final position	Pld	W	D	L	GF	GA	GD	Win %
Botola	21 August 2011	27 May 2012	Matchday 1	4th	30	14	9	7	34	34	+0	46.67
Throne Cup	7 August 2011	7 August 2011	Round of 32	Round of 32	1	0	0	1	2	3	−1	0.00
2011 Champions League	16 July 2011	18 September 2011	Group stage	Group stage	6	0	3	3	1	5	−4	0.00
2012 Champions League	25 March 2012	8 April 2012	First round	First round	2	1	0	1	3	5	−2	50.00
Total					39	15	12	12	40	47	−7	38.46

Last updated: 27 May 2012
Source: Sofascore

=== Botola ===
==== League table ====
Pos	Team	Pld	W	D	L	GF	GA	GD	Pts	Qualification or relegation
2	FUS Rabat	30	16	9	5	32	16	+16	57	Qualification for 2013 CAF Champions League
3	Wydad AC	30	13	12	5	32	18	+14	51	Qualification for 2013 CAF Confederation Cup (Note: AS FAR qualified for the 2013 CAF Confederation Cup as the 2012 Moroccan Throne Cup runner-up since winners Raja CA participated in the 2012–13 UAFA Club Cup.)
4	Raja CA	30	14	9	7	34	24	+10	51	participation in the UAFA Club Cup
5	Difaa El Jadida	30	13	9	8	35	27	+8	48	
6	MAS Fes	30	10	11	9	35	26	+9	41	

Updated to match(es) played on 27 May 2012. Source: goalzz.com
Rules for classification: 1) points; 2) goal difference; 3) number of goals scored.

==== Matches ====
Date	Opponents	Venue	Result	Scorers	Report
21 August 2011	Kénitra AC	A	0–1		Report
21 September 2011	Maghreb Fès	H	1–1	Souari 44'	Report
25 September 2011	AS FAR	A	0–0		
16 October 2011	Chabab Rif Hoceima	H	0–0		
23 October 2011	Hassania Agadir	A	0–0		
29 October 2011	COD Meknès	H	1–0	Ouhaki 17'	
15 November 2011	Olympique Safi	H	2–1	Belmaalem 4' (pen.) Sanhaji 88' (pen.)	
20 November 2011	Ittihad Khemisset	A	0–0		
28 November 2011	Wydad Fès	H	2–0	Salhi 90+2', 90+4'	
3 December 2011	Fath Union Sport	A	0–2		
11 December 2011	Olympique Khouribga	H	2–1	Salhi 28' Belaamri 40'	
18 December 2011	Moghreb Tétouan	A	2–1	Jahouh 21' (o.g.) Salhi 45'	
24 December 2011	JS Massira	H	1–0	Jaouhari 72'	
31 December 2011	Wydad AC	A	0–0		
1 January 2012	Difaâ El Jadidi	H	2–1	Belmaalem 35' Oulhaj 90+4'	
12 February 2012	Maghreb Fès	A	1–1	Malcuit 67'	
18 February 2012	AS FAR	H	3–1	Malcuit 13' Houbry 34' Sanhaji 42'	
26 February 2012	Chabab Rif Hoceima	A	0–0		
4 March 2012	Hassania Agadir	H	2–0	El Moubarki 62' Salim 90+1'	
11 March 2012	COD Meknès	A	1–0	Sanhaji 78'	
17 March 2012	Olympique Safi	A	1–2	Salhi 73'	
31 March 2012	Wydad Fès	A	0–2		
3 April 2012	Ittihad Khemisset	H	1–0	Oulhaj 90+1'	
15 April 2012	Olympique Khouribga	A	1–1	Oulhaj 45+1'	
19 April 2012	Fath Union Sport	H	1–0	Soulaimani 89'	
23 April 2012	Moghreb Tétouan	H	0–2		
29 April 2012	JS Massira	A	4–1	El Moubarki 10', 52' Hafidi 68', 90+3'	
6 May 2012	Wydad AC	H	0–1		
21 May 2012	Difaâ El Jadidi	A	1–3	Salhi 60' (pen.)	
27 May 2012	Kénitra AC	H	5–2	Salhi 21' (pen.), 59' El Moubarki 57' Hafidi 66' Wakili 67'	

=== Throne Cup ===
Date	Opponents	Venue	Result	Scorers	Report
07/08/2011	Olympique Safi	H	2–3	Talal 53' Salhi 57'	Report

=== 2011 CAF Champions League ===
==== Group A ====
Pos	Team	Pld	W	D	L	GF	GA	GD	Pts	Qualification
1	(Nigeria) Enyimba	6	4	2	0	11	5	+6	14	Advance to knockout stage
2	(Sudan) Al-Hilal	6	2	2	2	6	7	−1	8	Advance to knockout stage
3	(Cameroon) Coton Sport FC	6	2	1	3	7	8	−1	7	
4	(Morocco) Raja CA	6	0	3	3	1	5	−4	3	

Source: CAF
Rules for classification: Group stage tiebreakers

16 July 2011	Raja CA (Morocco)	0 – 0	(Cameroon) Coton Sport	Stade Mohamed V, Casablanca
21:00 UTC+01:00		Report		Referee: Jerome Damon (South Africa)

29 July 2011	Al-Hilal (Sudan)	1 – 0	(Morocco) Raja CA	Al-Hilal Stadium, Omdurman
20:00 UTC+03:00	Edward Sadomba 63' (pen.)	Report

14 August 2011	Enyimba (Nigeria)	2 – 0	(Morocco) Raja CA	Enyimba International Stadium, Aba
14:00 UTC+01:00	Uche Kalu 9'; Chidozie Johnson 25'	Report

26 August 2011	Raja CA (Morocco)	0 – 0	(Nigeria) Enyimba	Stade Mohamed V, Casablanca
22:00 UTC±00:00		Report

10 September 2011	Coton Sport (Cameroon)	2 – 1	(Morocco) Raja CA	Stade Omnisports Roumde-Adja, Garoua
16:00 UTC+01:00	Osmaila Baba 54', 64'	Report	Abdessamad Ouhakki 16'

18 September 2011	Raja CA (Morocco)	0 – 0	(Sudan) Al-Hilal	Stade Mohamed V, Casablanca
15:00 UTC±00:00		Report

=== 2012 CAF Champions League ===
25 March 2012	Berekum Chelsea (Ghana)	5–0	(Morocco) Raja CA	Golden City Park, Berekum
14:00 UTC±00:00	Asante 34'; Clottey 53', 62' (pen.), 88'; Mohammed 66'	Report		Referee: Denis Dembele (Ivory Coast)

8 April 2012	Raja CA (Morocco)	3–0	(Ghana) Berekum Chelsea	Stade Mohamed V, Casablanca
20:00 UTC±00:00	Oulhaj 50'; Tair 70'; Salhi 90+2'	Report		Referee: Khalid Abdel Rahman (Sudan)

== Squad information ==
=== Goals ===
Includes all competitive matches. The list is sorted alphabetically by surname when total goals are equal.

Rank	Pos.	Player	Botola	Throne Cup	Champions league	Total
1	FW	(Morocco) Yassine Salhi	8	1	1	10
2	FW	(Morocco) Bouchaib El Moubarki	4	0	0	4
3	DF	(Morocco) Mohamed Oulhaj	3	0	1	4
4	FW	(Morocco) Abdelilah Hafidi	3	0	0	3
5	FW	(Morocco) Hossamdine Sanhaji	3	0	0	3
6	DF	(Morocco) Ismail Belmaalem	2	0	0	2
7	FW	(France) Samir Malcuit	2	0	0	2
8	AM	(Morocco) Abdessamad Ouhaki	1	0	1	2
9	FW	(Morocco) Hassan Souari	1	0	0	1
10	FW	(Morocco) Hassan Tair	0	0	1	1
11	DF	(Morocco) Rachid Soulaimani	1	0	0	1
12	FW	(Morocco) Soufiane Talal	0	1	0	1
13	DF	(Morocco) Rabii Houbry	1	0	0	1
14	MF	(Morocco) Driss Belaamri	1	0	0	1
15	MF	(Morocco) Mohamed Achraf Salim	1	0	0	1
16	FW	(Morocco) Zakaria Jaouhari	1	0	0	1
17	MF	(Morocco) Yacine Wakili	1	0	0	1
Own goals			1	0	0	1
Total			34	2	4	40

=== Assists ===
Rank	Pos.	Player	Botola	Throne Cup	Champions league	Total
1	FW	(Morocco) Hassan Tair	5	0	0	5
2	FW	(Morocco) Yassine Salhi	4	0	0	4
3	DF	(Morocco) Rachid Soulaimani	2	0	1	3
4	FW	(Morocco) Bouchaib El Moubarki	1	1	0	2
5	MF	(Morocco) Yacine Wakili	2	0	0	2
6	FW	(Morocco) Abdelilah Hafidi	1	0	0	1
7	MF	(Ivory Coast) Kouko Guehi	1	0	0	1
8	DF	(Morocco) Amin Erbati	0	0	1	1
9	FW	(France) Samir Malcuit	1	0	0	1
10	FW	(Morocco) Hassan Souari	1	0	0	1
11	FW	(Morocco) Hossamdine Sanhaji	1	0	0	1
