= Football at the 2005 Mediterranean Games =

2005 Mediterranean Games football tournament
Tournament details
- Host country: Spain
- City: Almería
- Dates: 23 June – 3 July
- Teams: 9
- Venue: 4 (in 4 host cities)

Final positions
- Champions: Spain (1st title)
- Runners-up: Turkey
- Third place: Libya
- Fourth place: Morocco

Tournament statistics
- Matches played: 25
- Goals scored: 37 (1.48 per match)
- Top scorer(s): (Turkey) Arda Turan (Turkey) Cafercan Aksu (Morocco) Hassan Souari (3 goals each)

The 2005 Mediterranean Games football tournament was the 15th edition of the Mediterranean Games men's football tournament. The football tournament was held in Almería, Spain between 23 June and 3 July 2005 as part of the 2005 Mediterranean Games and was contested by 9 teams, all countries were represented by the U-23 teams (although in fact none of the players named were older than 21); Spain won the gold medal.

== Participating teams ==
These nine teams were sorted into three groups of three teams. The top two teams in each group advanced to the quarter finals, as well as the two best third-placed sides.

Federation	Nation
CAF Africa	Algeria; Libya; Morocco; Tunisia (holders)
AFC Asia	None
UEFA Europe	Greece; Italy; Malta; Spain (hosts); Turkey

== Venues ==
Cities	Venues	Capacity
Almería	Estadio de los Juegos Mediterráneos	22,000
Roquetas de Mar	Estadio Antonio Peroles	9,000
El Ejido	Estadio Municipal Santo Domingo	7,870
Vícar	Estadio Municipal de Vicar	4,000

== Tournament ==
All times are local (CEST (UTC+2)

Key to colours in group tables
Group winners and runners-up advance to the Semi-finals
Best group thirds advance to the Semi-finals

=== Group stages ===
==== Group A ====
Team	Pld	W	D	L	GF	GA	GD	Pts
Italy	2	1	1	0	3	0	+3	4
Libya	2	1	0	1	1	3	−2	3
Morocco	2	0	1	1	0	1	−1	1

23 June 2005

Italy	3–0	Libya
Vantaggiato 34'; Iunco 79'; Masini 90'

Estadio Antonio Peroles, Roquetas de Mar

25 June 2005

Libya	1–0	Morocco
El Khatroushi 38'

Estadio Antonio Peroles, Roquetas de Mar

27 June 2005

Italy	0–0	Morocco

Estadio Antonio Peroles, Roquetas de Mar

==== Group B ====
Team	Pld	W	D	L	GF	GA	GD	Pts
Turkey	2	1	1	0	6	1	+5	4
Spain	2	1	1	0	3	1	+2	4
Malta	2	0	0	2	0	7	−7	0

23 June 2005

Spain	2–0	Malta
Kepa 77'; Arizmendi 82'

Estadio Municipal Santo Domingo, El Ejido

25 June 2005

Turkey	1–1	Spain
Aksu 65'		Puerta 52'

Estadio Municipal Santo Domingo, El Ejido
Referee: Francisco Ferreira (Portugal)

27 June 2005

Turkey	5–0	Malta
Sungur 47'; Aksu 63'; Turan 76', 90'; Reis 86'

Estadio Municipal Santo Domingo, El Ejido
Referee: Mohamed Zekrini (Algeria)

==== Group C ====
Team	Pld	W	D	L	GF	GA	GD	Pts
Algeria	2	1	1	0	3	2	+1	4
Tunisia	2	0	2	0	3	3	0	2
Greece	2	0	1	1	2	3	−1	1

23 June 2005

Algeria	2–2	Tunisia
Hanitser 33', 83'		Melliti 29'; Laâbidi 39'

Estadio Municipal de Vícar, Vícar

25 June 2005

Tunisia	1–1	Greece
Ben Yahia		Arabatzis 39'

Estadio Municipal de Vícar, Vícar

27 June 2005

Algeria	1–0	Greece
Metref 37'

Estadio Municipal de Vícar, Vícar

=== Knockout stage ===
Quarterfinals
29 June–El Ejido
Turkey	1
Greece	0
29 June–Roquetas de Mar
Algeria	0
Morocco	2
29 June–El Ejido
Italy	1
Spain	2
29 June–Roquetas de Mar
Libya (p)	1 (4)
Tunisia	1 (3)

Semifinals
1 July–Roquetas de Mar
Turkey	1
Morocco	0
1 July–El Ejido
Spain	5
Libya	0

Final
3 July–Roquetas de Mar
Turkey	0
Spain	1
Third place
3 July–Almería
Morocco	1 (3)
Libya (p)	1 (4)

==== Quarterfinals ====
29 June 2005

Libya	1–1	Tunisia
Ezwawi		Ben Yahia
Penalties
	4–3

Estadio Antonio Peroles, Roquetas de Mar

29 June 2005

Morocco	2–0	Algeria
Souari 24', 87'

Estadio Antonio Peroles, Roquetas de Mar

29 June 2005

Turkey	1–0	Greece
Aksu 34'

Estadio Municipal Santo Domingo, El Ejido
Referee: Paolo Dondarini (Italy)

29 June 2005

Spain	2–1	Italy
Montañés 67'; Puerta 80'		Vantaggiato 43'

Estadio Municipal Santo Domingo, El Ejido

==== Semifinals ====
1 July 2005

Turkey	1–0	Morocco
Turan 31'

Estadio Antonio Peroles, Roquetas de Mar
Referee: Mohamed Imhamed (Egypt)

1 July 2005

Spain	5–0	Libya
Gámez 4', 60' del Moral 71', 87'; Valera 76'

Estadio Municipal Santo Domingo, El Ejido

==== 3rd place match ====
3 July 2005

Libya	1–1	Morocco
Mabrouk 87'		Souari 9'
Penalties
	4–3

Estadio Antonio Peroles, Roquetas de Mar

==== Final ====
3 July 2005

Spain	1–0	Turkey
Kepa 7'

Estadio de los Juegos Mediterráneos, Almería
Referee: João Lopes Ferreira (Portugal)
