= List of Raja CA managers =

Raja Club Athletic (Arabic: نادي الرجاء الرياضي, romanized: Nādī ar-Rajāʾ ar-Riyāḍī), commonly referred to as Raja CA, is a professional sports club based in Casablanca, Morocco.

This chronological list comprises all the managers who have held this position in the first team of Raja CA throughout its history since their foundation on 20 March 1949. Each manager's entry includes his dates of tenure and the significant achievements accomplished under his care. Caretaker managers are included, where known, as well as those who have been in permanent charge.

== History ==
Being one of the founders of Raja CA, Mohamed Naoui was player-manager between 1949 and 1954, and is to date the only one to have held this position. The first coach was Abdelkader Jalal who led Raja between 1951 and 1954. In September 1956, Kacem Kacemi qualified with the team to the first edition of Botola, after three victories in the play-offs. Raja was the first team to do so since their qualifying match was played at 8:30 am on 7 October 1956.

The club's longest-serving manager was Père Jégo, he managed the team three times during 11 years (1957–1965, 1965-1967 and 1968–1969). The most successful manager of the club's history is Oscar Fulloné with six trophies, five won between 1998 and 2000, and one between in 2006.

Père Jégo, Mohamed Tibari, Alexandru Moldovan, M'hamed Fakhir and José Romão are the only ones to have coached the team during three spells or more (excluding temporary spells). Mohamed Tibari gained Raja's first trophy in 1974, while Fernando Cabrita earned their first Botola in 1988. Raja then won its first Champions League with Rabah Saâdane in 1989, his second with Vahid Halilhodžić in 1997 and secured his third star with Oscar Fullone in 1999.

== Head coaches ==
Mohamed Naoui, one of Raja's founding members and its first manager

Abdelkader Jalal, manager between 1951 and 1955

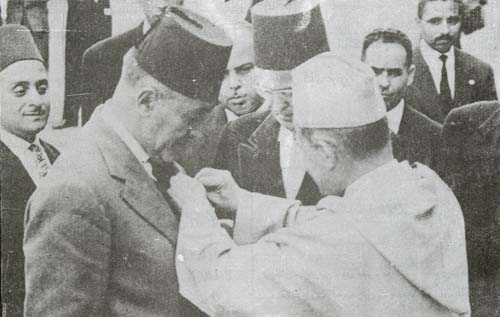
Père Jégo, an emblematic figure and initiator of Raja's style of play, he coached the club for more than 11 years. He is decorated here by King Mohammed V in 1957 when he was managing Raja CA

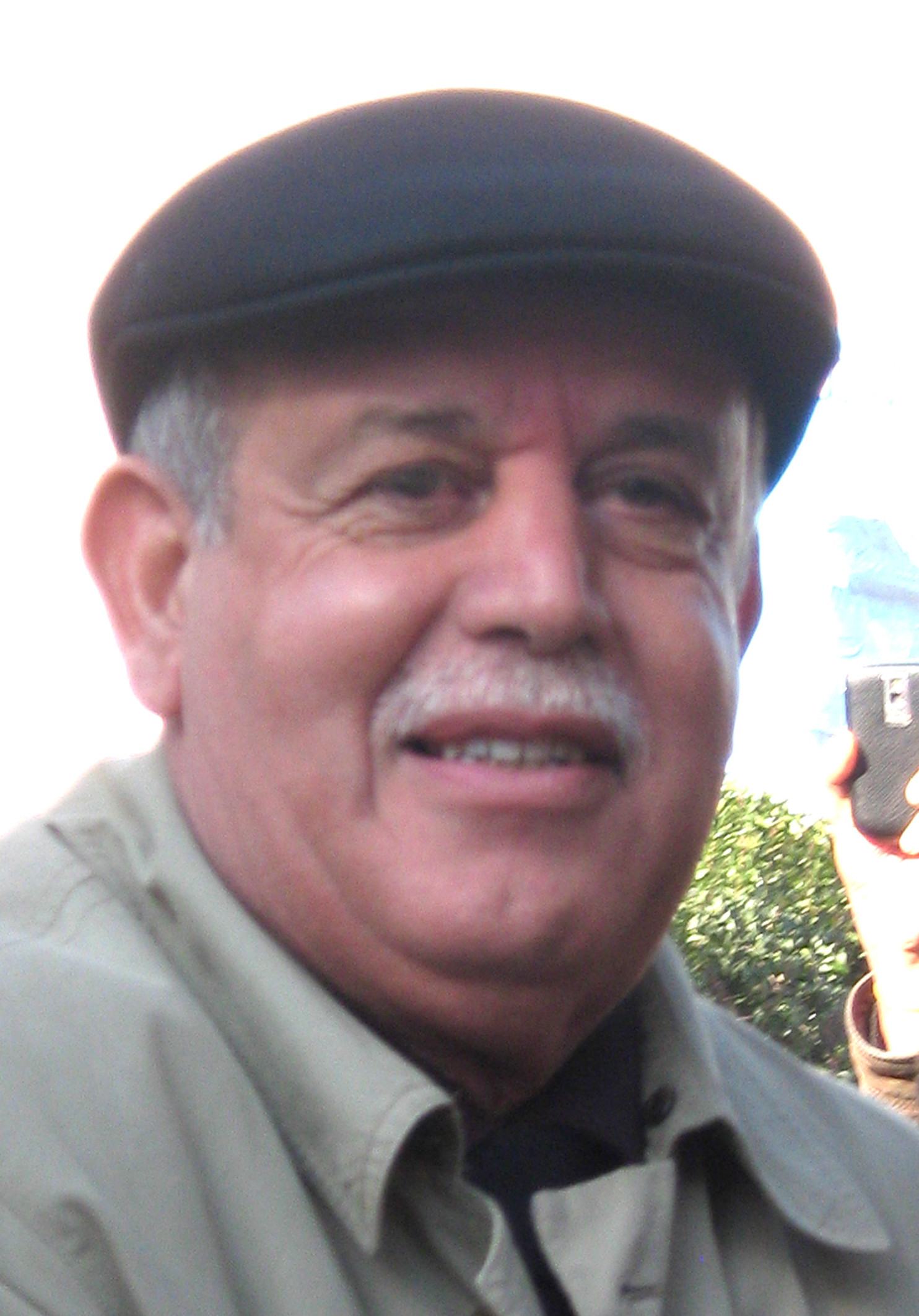
Rabah Saâdane, winner of the 1989 African Cup of Champions Clubs

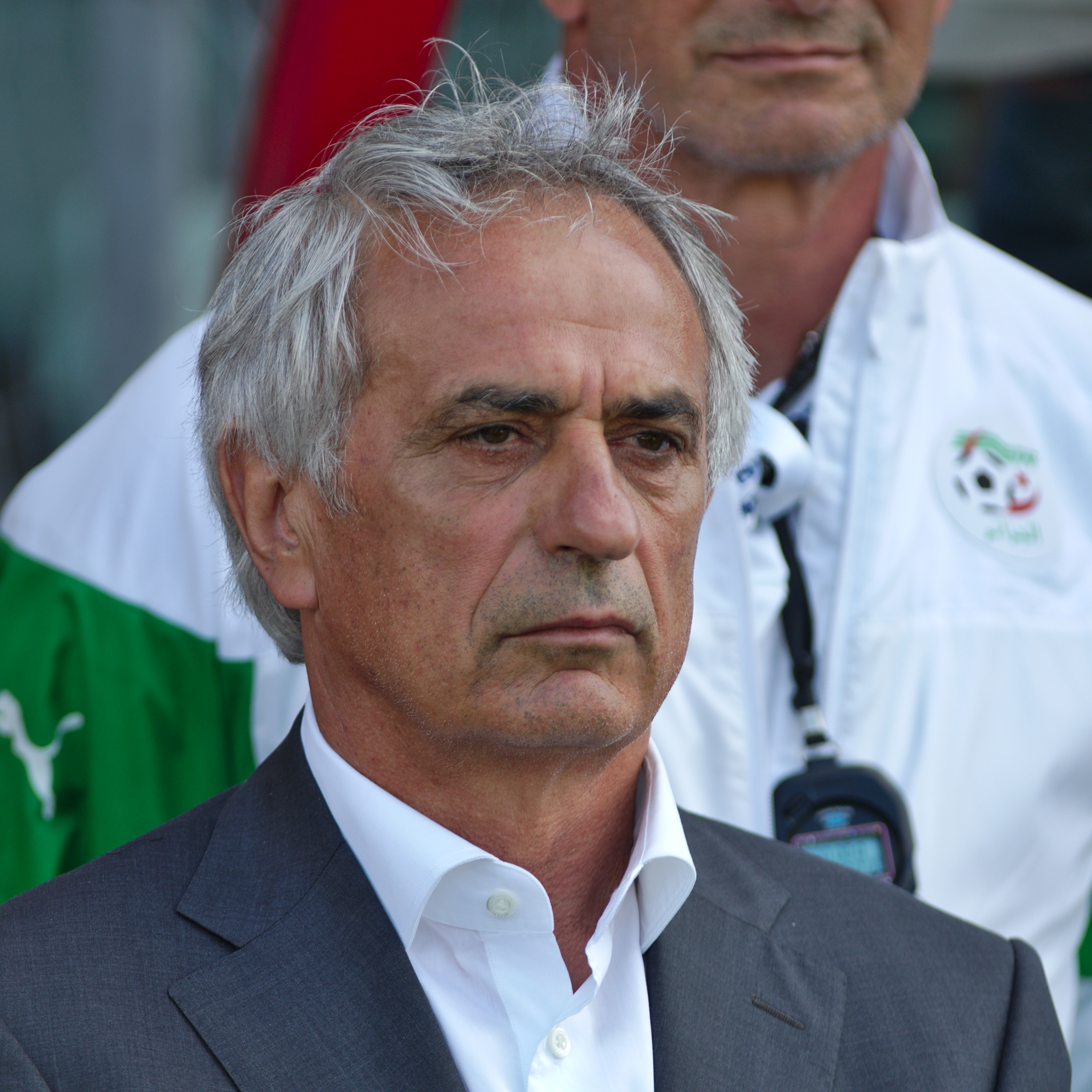
Vahid Halilhodžić, winner of the Botola-Champions League double in 1998.

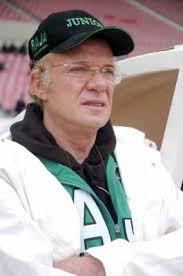
Oscar Fulloné is the most successful manager in the club's history winning 6 trophies in three seasons.

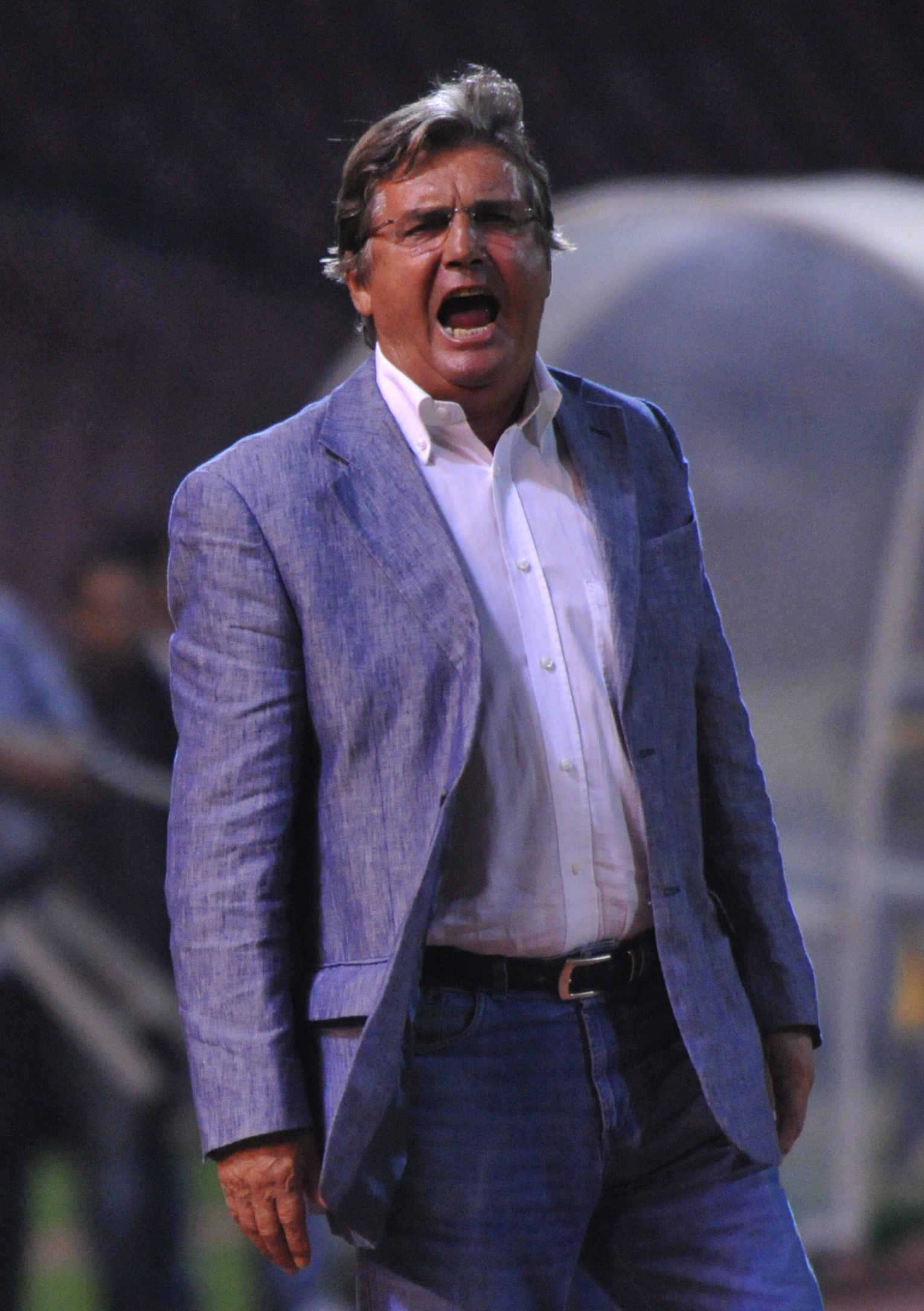
Henri Michel, winner of the 2003 CAF Cup.

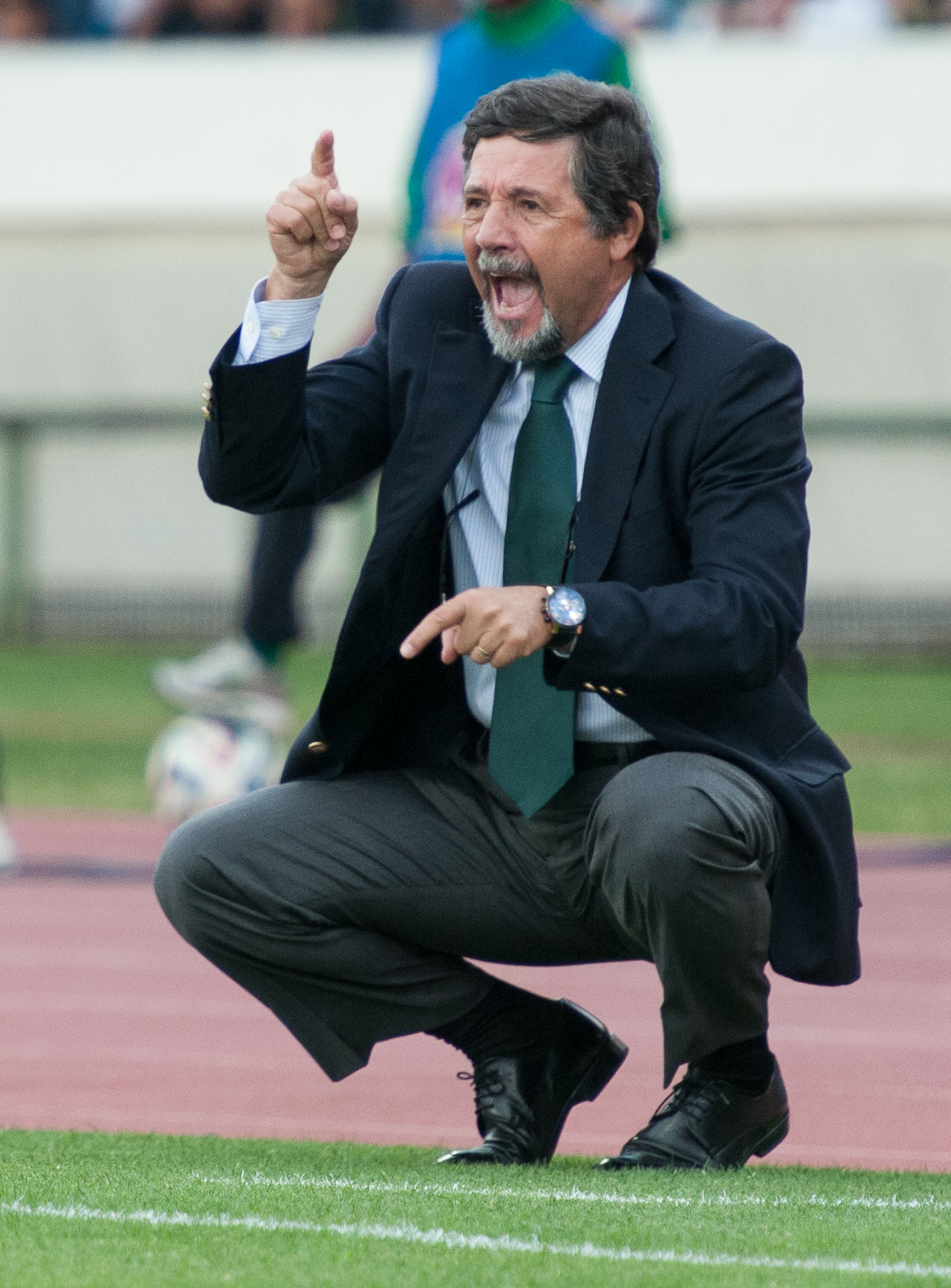
José Romão, the third Portuguese manager to win the Botola with Raja

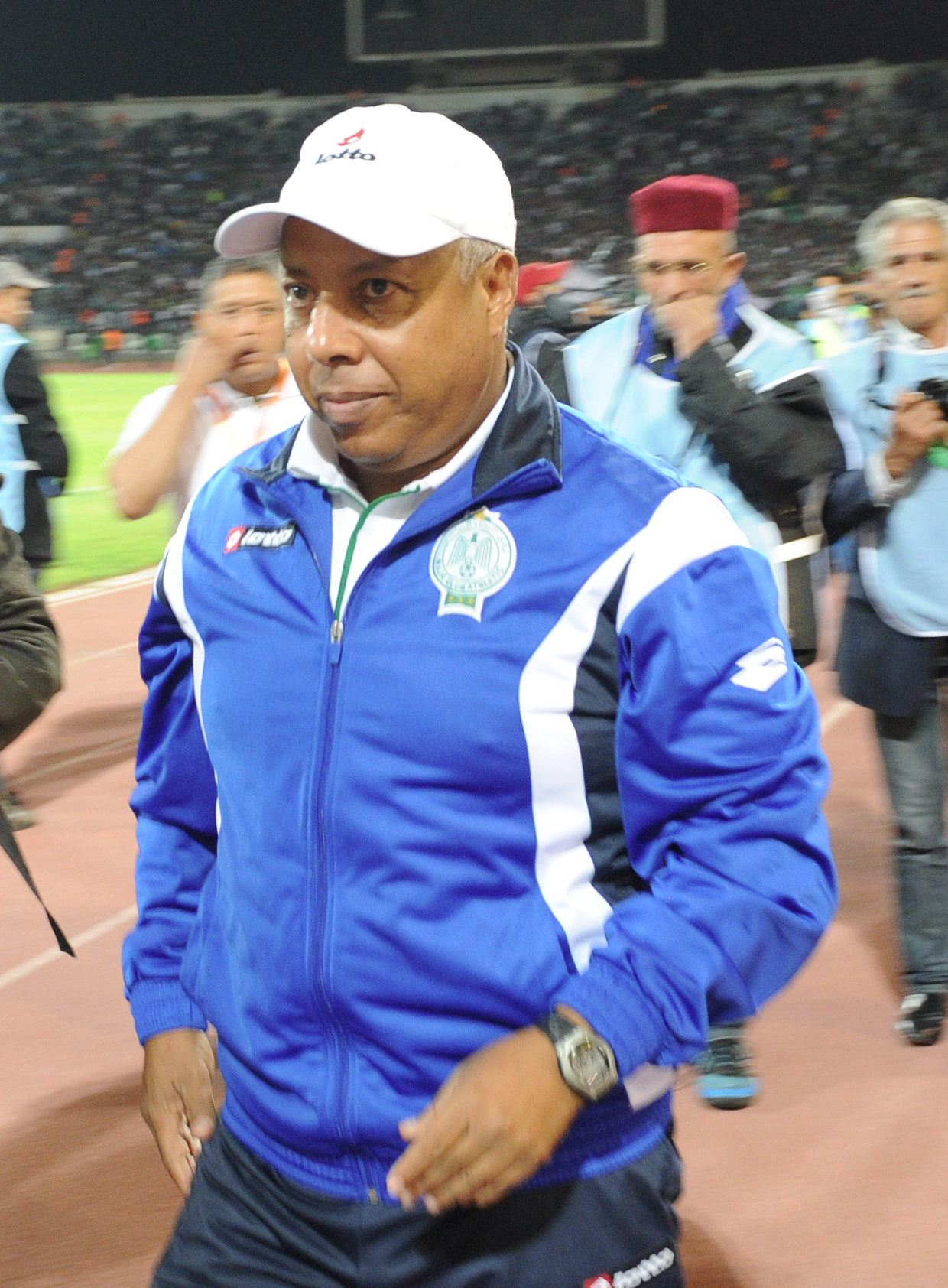
M'hamed Fakhir is the most successful Moroccan manager in the club's history with 4 trophies

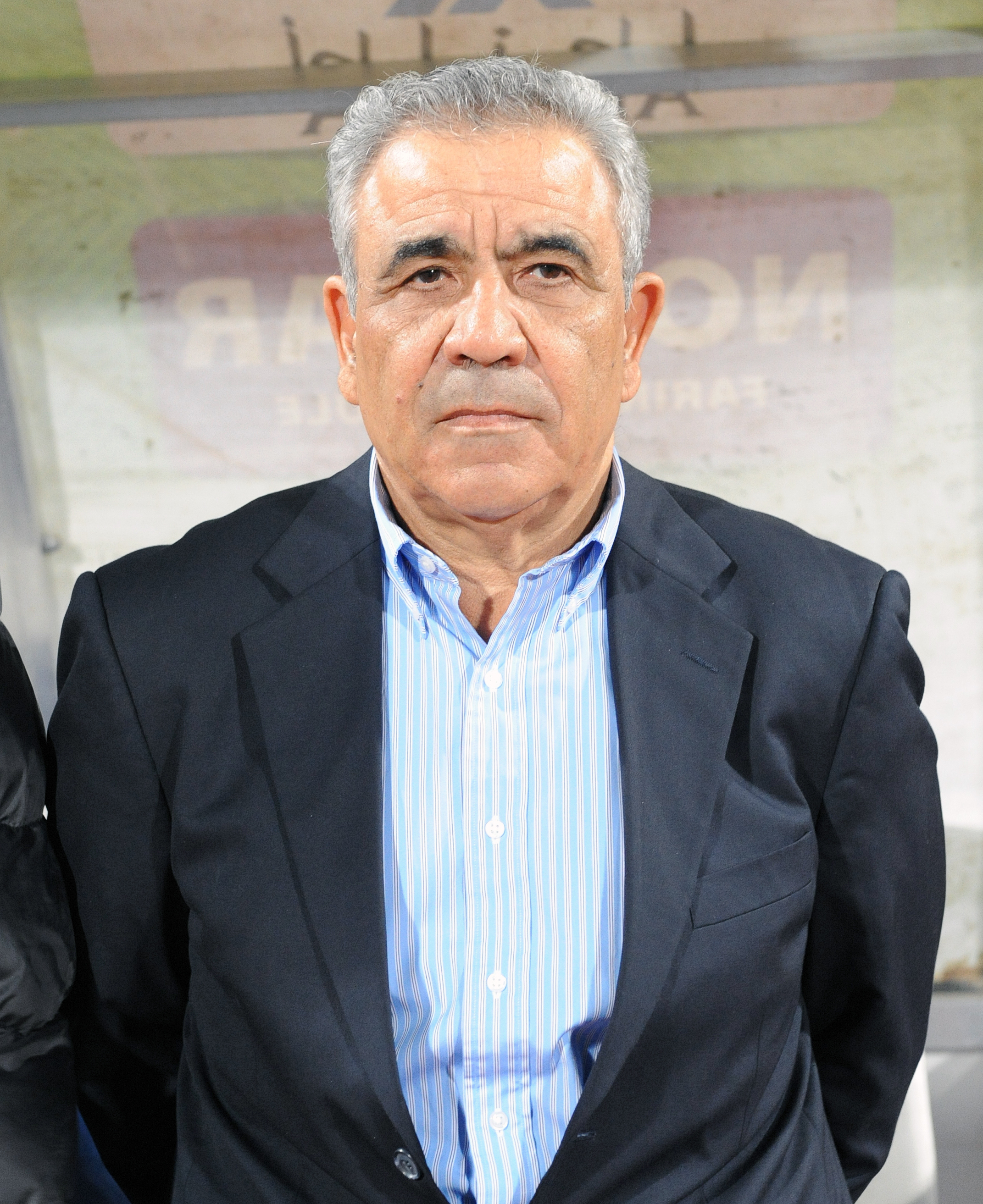
Faouzi Benzarti arrived a few days before the 2013 World Cup and reached the final

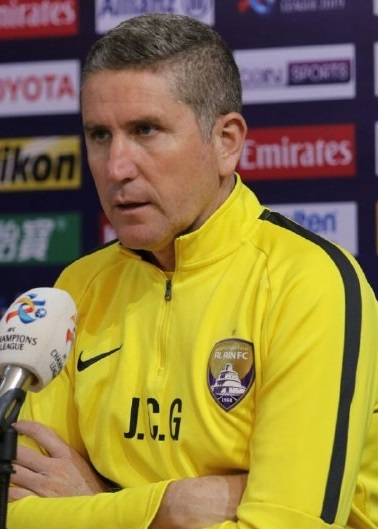
Juan Carlos Garrido won the 2017 Throne Cup and the 2018 Confederation Cup, Raja's first continental title for 15 years.

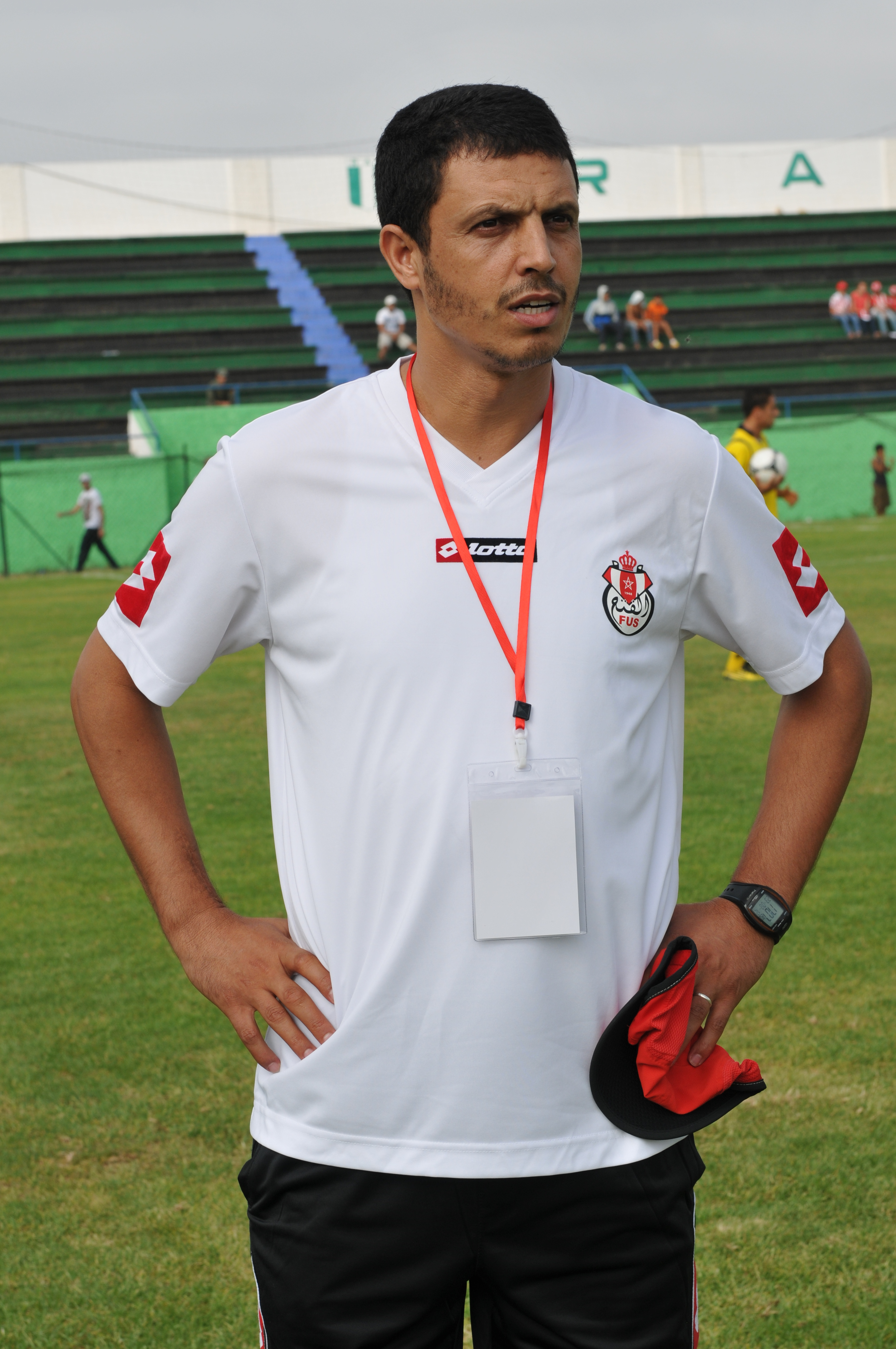
Jamal Sellami won the 2019–20 Botola, Raja's first league title in seven years

.

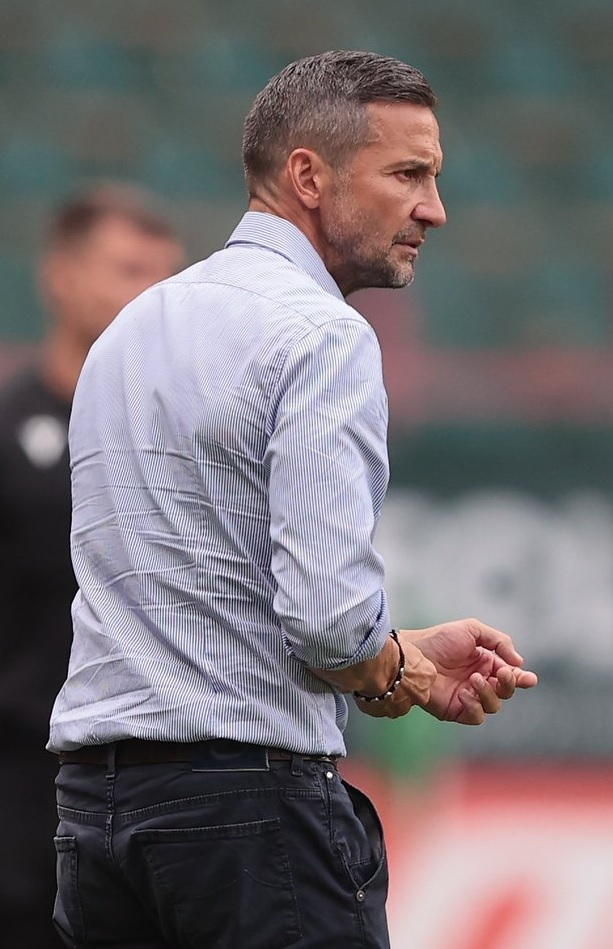
Josef Zinnbauer won the 2024 historic invincible-double

This is a complete list of all the managers in the history of Raja CA since 1949.

Table headers

- Nationality – If the manager played international football as a player, the country/countries he played for are shown. Otherwise, the manager's nationality is given as their country of birth.
- From – The year of the manager's first game for Raja CA.
- To – The year of the manager's last game for Raja CA.
- Honours – The trophies won while managing Raja CA.

Key

- ^{p} = Player-manager
- ^{[C]} = Caretaker manager

Raja CA Managers
Manager	Nationality	From	To	Honours	Notes
Mohamed Naoui^{p}	Morocco	20 March 1949	10 November 1951	–	
Abdelkader Jalal^{p}	Morocco	10 November 1951	1954	–	
Abdelkader Jalal	Morocco	1954	December 1955	–	
Abdelkader Lakhmiri	Morocco	December 1955	July 1956	1955–56 Botola Playoffs	
Kacem Kacemi	Morocco	September 1956		–	
Abdelkader Jalal^{[C]}	Morocco	September 1956	January 1957	–	
Père Jégo	Morocco	January 1957	1965	–	
Larbi Ben Barek	Morocco	1965	1965	–	
Père Jégo	Morocco	1965	1967	–	
Mohamed Jabrane^{[C]}	Morocco	1967	1967	–	
Abdelhak El Kadmiri	Morocco	1967	1968	–	
Père Jégo	Morocco	1968	1969	–	
Abderrahman Mahjoub	Morocco	1969	1970	–	
Abdelkader Lakhmiri	Morocco	1970	1971	–	
Pál Orosz	Hungary	1971	1973	–	
Mohamed Roudani	Morocco	1973	1973	–	
Mohamed Tibari	Morocco	1973	1975	1973–74 Throne Cup	
Petre Mindru	Romania	1975	1976	–	
Dobromir Tashkov	Bulgaria	1976	1978	1976–77 Throne Cup	
Houmane Jarir	Morocco	1978	1979	–	
Mohamed Tibari	Morocco	1979	1980		
Pál Orosz	Hungary	1980	1981	–	
Mustapha Bettache	Morocco	1981	1981	–	
Mohamed Tibari	Morocco	1981	1982	1981-82 Throne Cup	
Houmane Jarir	Morocco	1982	1983	–	
Dobromir Tashkov	Bulgaria	1983	1984	–	
Ion Motroc	Romania	1984	1985	–	
Mohamed Ammari	Morocco	1985	1986	–	
Hassan Hormat Allah	Morocco	1986	1986	–	
Mohamed Ammari	Morocco	1986	1987	–	
Fernando Cabrita	Portugal	July 1987	February 1989	1987-88 Botola	
Rabah Saâdane	Algeria	February 1989	6 May 1990	1989 African Cup of Champions Clubs	
M'hamed Fakhir^{[C]}	Morocco	7 May 1990	June 1990	–	
Fernando Cabrita	Portugal	June 1990	February 1991	–	
Abdellah Settati	Morocco	February 1991	March 1991	–	
M'hamed Fakhir^{[C]}	Morocco	March 1991	April 1991	–	
Fernando Cabrita	Portugal	April 1991	February 1992	–	
Mohamed Nejmi^{[C]}	Morocco	February 1992	March 1992	–	
Abdellah Blinda	Morocco	March 1992	June 1992	–	
Valentin Ivanov	Russia	June 1992	March 1993	–	
M'hamed Fakhir	Morocco	March 1993	June 1993	–	
Meziane Ighil	Algeria	June 1993	June 1994	–	
Jean Thissen	Belgium	June 1994	June 1995	–	
Evgeni Rogov	Russia	June 1995	February 1996	–	
M'hamed Fakhir^{[C]}	Morocco	February 1996	April 1996	1995-96 Throne Cup	
Evgeni Rogov	Russia	April 1996	June 1996	1995-96 Botola	
Victor Razamovski	Russia	July 1996	September 1996	–	
Rabah Saâdane	Algeria	September 1996	October 1996	–	
Alexandru Moldovan	Romania	October 1996	July 1997	1996-97 Botola	
Mohamed Ammari	Morocco	July 1997	October 1997	–	
Hamid Bouchetta^{[C]}	Morocco	October 1997	November 1997	–	
Vahid Halilhodžić	Bosnia and Herzegovina	November 1997	June 1998	1997-98 Botola; 1997 CAF Champions League	
Slavoljub Muslin	Serbia	June 1998	November 1998	–	
Oscar Fulloné	Argentina	November 1998	January 2000	1998-99 Botola; 1999 CAF Champions League; 1998 Afro-Asian Club Championship	
Fathi Jamal^{[C]}	Morocco	January 2000	February 2000	–	
Oscar Fulloné	Argentina	February 2000	June 2000	1999-2000 Botola; 2000 CAF Super Cup	
Fathi Jamal^{[C]}	Morocco	June 2000	14 August 2000	–	
Valdeir Vieira	Brazil	14 August 2000	3 November 2000	–	
Alexandru Moldovan	Romania	4 November 2000	5 March 2001	–	
Silvester Takač	Serbia	5 March 2001	28 May 2001	2000-01 Botola	
Mohamed Nejmi^{[C]}	Morocco	28 May 2001	10 June 2001	–	
Fathi Jamal^{[C]}	Morocco	10 June 2001	16 September 2001	–	
Yuri Sebastienko	Ukraine	16 September 2001	4 October 2001	–	
Fathi Jamal^{[C]}	Morocco	4 October 2001	28 November 2001	–	
Mohamed Nejmi^{[C]}	Morocco	28 November 2001	7 January 2002	–	
Walter Meeuws	Belgium	7 January 2002	28 January 2003	–	
Henri Michel	France	30 January 2003	11 March 2004	2003 CAF Cup; 2001-02 Throne Cup	
Acácio Casimiro	Portugal	11 March 2004	2 July 2004	2003-04 Botola	
Alain Fiard	France	2 July 2004	23 November 2004	–	
Mohamed Nejmi^{[C]}	Morocco	23 November 2004	8 December 2004	–	
Henri Stambouli	France	8 December 2004	15 July 2005	–	
Alexandru Moldovan	Romania	15 July 2005	18 October 2005	2005 Throne Cup	
Jamal Sellami^{[C]}	Morocco	18 October 2005	20 December 2005	–	
Oscar Fulloné	Argentina	20 December 2005	16 November 2006	2005–06 Arab Champions League	
Redouane Hajry^{[C]}	Morocco	16 November 2006	6 December 2006	–	
Paco Fortes	Spain	6 December 2006	3 April 2007	–	
Mohamed Nejmi^{[C]}	Morocco	3 April 2007	12 June 2007	–	
Jean-Yves Chay	France	12 June 2007	18 May 2008	–	
José Romão	Portugal	22 May 2008	30 June 2009	2008-09 Botola	
Carlos Mozer	Brazil	6 July 2009	19 October 2009	–	
José Romão	Portugal	20 October 2009	12 June 2010	–	
Henri Michel	France	13 June 2010	6 October 2010	–	
M'hamed Fakhir	Morocco	11 October 2010	8 July 2011	2010-11 Botola	
Ilie Balaci	Romania	14 July 2011	15 September 2011	–	
Abdellatif Jrindou^{[C]}	Morocco	15 September 2011	24 September 2011	–	
Bertrand Marchand	France	24 September 2011	8 June 2012	–	
M'hamed Fakhir	Morocco	10 June 2012	28 November 2013	2012 Throne Cup; 2012-13 Botola	
Hilal Et-tair^{[C]}	Morocco	28 November 2013	6 December 2013	–	
Faouzi Benzarti	Tunisia	6 December 2013	28 May 2014	–	
Abdelhak Benchikha	Algeria	1 June 2014	23 September 2014	–	
José Romão	Portugal	24 September 2014	4 May 2015	–	
Fathi Jamal^{[C]}	Morocco	5 May 2015	11 June 2015	–	
Ruud Krol	Netherlands	12 June 2015	4 November 2015	2015 UNAF Club Cup	
Rachid Taoussi	Morocco	5 November 2015	13 July 2016	–	
M'hamed Fakhir	Morocco	9 August 2016	25 May 2017	–	
Abdelhak Benchikha	Algeria	1 June 2017	15 June 2017	–	
Juan Carlos Garrido	Spain	20 June 2017	28 January 2019	2017 Throne Cup; 2018 CAF Confederation Cup	
Youssef Safri^{[C]}	Morocco	28 January 2019	30 January 2019	–	
Patrice Carteron	France	30 January 2019	10 November 2019	2019 CAF Super Cup	
Jamal Sellami	Morocco	11 November 2019	6 April 2021	2019-20 Botola	
Mohamed Bekkari^{[C]}	Morocco	6 April 2021	13 April 2021	–	
Lassaad Chabbi	Tunisia	13 April 2021	9 November 2021	2021 CAF Confederation Cup; 2019–20 Arab Club Champions Cup	
Marc Wilmots	Belgium	11 November 2021	20 February 2022	–	
Mohamed Bekkari^{[C]}	Morocco	20 February 2022	28 February 2022	–	
Rachid Taoussi	Morocco	28 February 2022	23 June 2022	–	
Bouchaib El Moubarki^{[C]}	Morocco	23 June 2022	7 July 2022	–	
Faouzi Benzarti	Tunisia	7 July 2022	21 September 2022	–	
Mondher Kebaier	Tunisia	24 September 2022	7 June 2023	–	
Josef Zinnbauer	Germany	8 June 2023	24 July 2024	2023–24 Botola; 2023–24 Throne Cup	
Rusmir Cviko	Bosnia and Herzegovina	25 July 2024	27 September 2024	–	
Abdelkrim Jinani^{[C]}	Morocco	27 September 2024	9 October 2024	–	
Ricardo Sá Pinto	Portugal	10 October 2024	20 December 2024	–	
Hafid Abdessadek^{[C]}	Morocco	20 December 2024	4 February 2025	–	
Lassaad Chabbi	Tunisia	5 February 2025	22 September 2025	–	
Fadlu Davids	South Africa	22 September 2025	11 June 2026	–	
Nasredine Nabi	Tunisia	12 June 2026	31 August 2026	–	
Paco Jémez	Spain	31 August 2026	2 November 2026	–	
Abdelkrim Jinani	Morocco	2 November 2026	Present	–	

As of 12 November 2026

== By nationality ==
Nationality	Number
Morocco	31
France	6
Portugal	4
Romania	4
Tunisia	4
Algeria	3
Belgium	3
Russia	3
Spain	3
Bosnia and Herzegovina	2
Brazil	2
Serbia	2
Argentina	1
Bulgaria	1
Germany	1
Hungary	1
Netherlands	1
Ukraine	1
South Africa	1
Total	74

== Trophies ==
Name	National		Regional			Continental					Intercontinental		Total
Name	Botola	TC	ACC	ASC	NAC	CL	CCC	CC	SC	ACWC	FCWC	AACC	Total
(Argentina) Oscar Fulloné	2	–	1	–	–	1	–	–	1	–	–	1	6
(Morocco) M'hamed Fakhir	2	2	–	–	–	–	–	–	–	–	–	–	4
(Germany) Josef Zinnbauer	1	1	–	–	–	–	–	–	–	–	–	–	2
(Tunisia) Lassaad Chabbi	–	–	1	–	–	–	1	–	–	–	–	–	2
(Spain) Juan Carlos Garrido	–	1	–	–	–	–	1	–	–	–	–	–	2
(France) Henri Michel	–	1	–	–	–	–	–	1	–	–	–	–	2
(Romania) Alexandru Moldovan	1	1	–	–	–	–	–	–	–	–	–	–	2
(Bosnia and Herzegovina) Vahid Halilhodžić	1	–	–	–	–	1	–	–	–	–	–	–	2
(Morocco) Mohamed Tibari	–	2	–	–	–	–	–	–	–	–	–	–	2
(Morocco) Jamal Sellami	1	–	–	–	–	–	–	–	–	–	–	–	1
(France) Patrice Carteron	–	–	–	–	–	–	–	–	1	–	–	–	1
(Netherlands) Ruud Krol	–	–	–	–	1	–	–	–	–	–	–	–	1
(Portugal) José Romão	1	–	–	–	–	–	–	–	–	–	–	–	1
(Portugal) Acácio Casimiro	1	–	–	–	–	–	–	–	–	–	–	–	1
(Serbia) Silvester Takač	1	–	–	–	–	–	–	–	–	–	–	–	1
(Russia) Evgeni Rogov	1	–	–	–	–	–	–	–	–	–	–	–	1
(Algeria) Rabah Saâdane	–	–	–	–	–	1	–	–	–	–	–	–	1
(Portugal) Fernando Cabrita	1	–	–	–	–	–	–	–	–	–	–	–	1
(Bulgaria) Dobromir Tashkov	–	1	–	–	–	–	–	–	–	–	–	–	1
Total	13	9	2	0	1	3	2	1	2	0	0	1	34
