= Malcuit =

Malcuit is a surname. Notable people with the surname include:

- Kévin Malcuit (born 1991), French footballer
- Samir Malcuit (born 1985), French footballer
