= Youness Bellakhder =

Moroccan footballer (born 1987)

Personal information
- Full name: Youness Bellakhder
- Date of birth: 17 June 1987 (age 39)
- Place of birth: Casablanca, Morocco
- Position: Right back

Team information
- Current team: Wydad Casablanca

Youth career
- Wydad Casablanca

Senior career*
| Years | Team | Apps | (Gls) |
| 2005–2006 | Wydad Casablanca | 2 | (0) |
| 2006–2007 | → Chabab Mohammédia (loan) | | |
| 2007–2009 | Maritimo | 0 | (0) |
| 2009–2011 | Raja de Casablanca | 25 | (1) |
| 2011–2012 | Olympique Safi | 35 | (5) |
| 2012–2014 | FAR Rabat | 13 | (1) |
| 2014–2015 | Muaither SC | | |
| 2015–2016 | MAT | 25 | (1) |
| 2016– | Wydad Casablanca | 1 | (0) |
- * Club domestic league appearances and goals as of 7 October 2012

Youness Bellakhder (born 17 June 1987) is a Moroccan footballer who plays as defender for Wydad Casablanca.

== Career ==
Born in Casablanca, Bellakhder began playing football for local side WAC Casablanca. The club sold his contract to Portuguese Liga club C.S. Maritimo during 2009, but Bellakhder never appeared for the first team.

He returned to the Moroccan first division with Raja Casablanca in 2009, helping the club participate in the North African Cup of Champions.
