= José Romão =

Portuguese football coach and former player

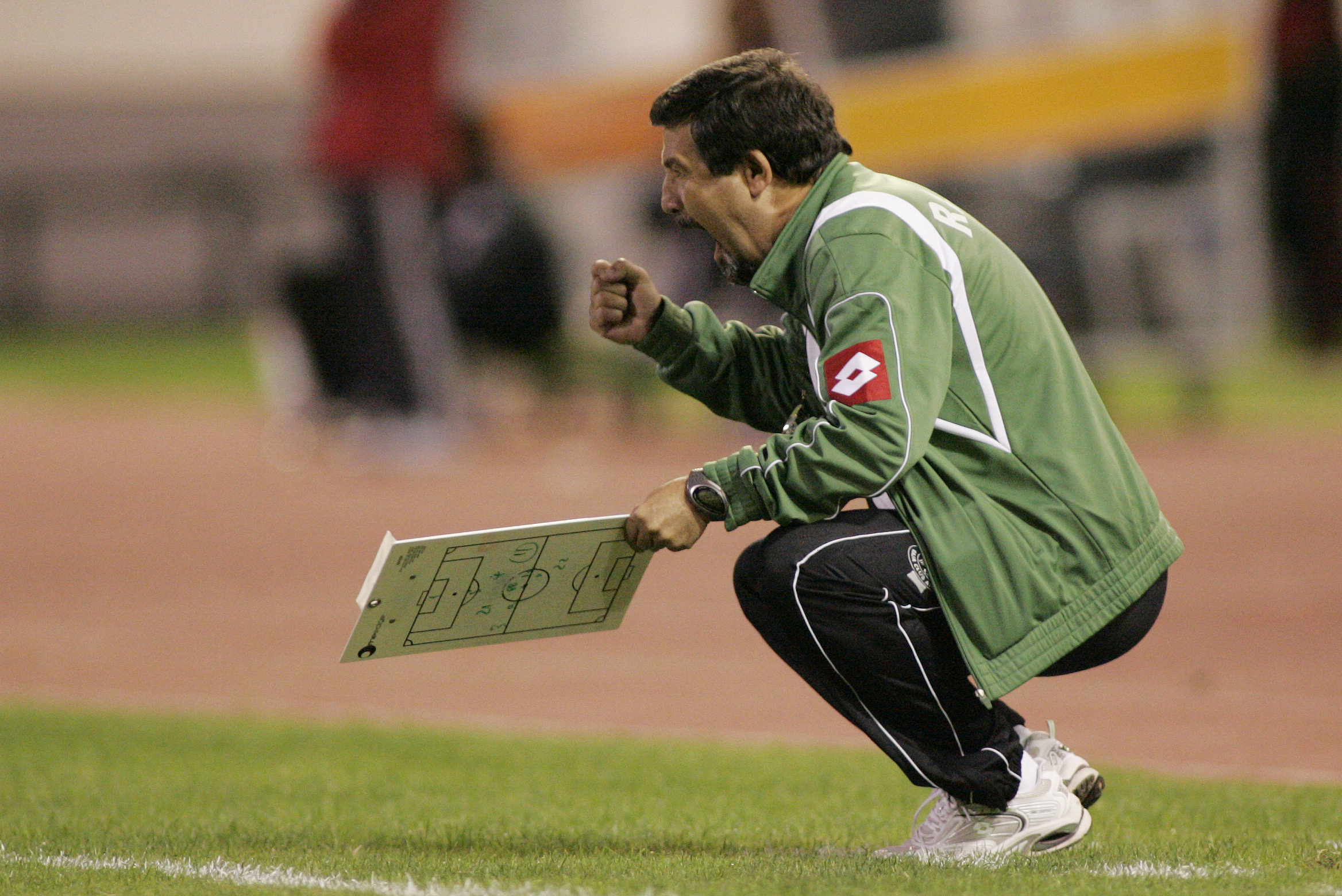
- Romão as manager of Raja Casablanca in 2008

Personal information
- Full name: José Pratas Romão
- Date of birth: 13 April 1954 (age 72)
- Place of birth: Beja, Portugal
- Position: Winger

Youth career
- 1966–1969: Despertar

Senior career*
Years	Team	Apps	(Gls)
1969–1971	Desportivo Beja		
1971–1976	Vitória Guimarães	12	(0)
1976–1978	Fafe	29	(5)
1978–1979	Penafiel		
1979–1981	Riopele	33	(1)
1981–1983	Alcobaça	49	(7)
1983–1984	Vizela	8	(0)
Total		131	(13)

Managerial career
- 1984–1986: Vizela
- 1986–1989: Penafiel
- 1989–1990: Chaves
- 1990: Vitória Setúbal
- 1990–1992: Chaves
- 1992–1993: Famalicão
- 1994: Belenenses
- 1995: Tirsense
- 1996–1997: Chaves
- 1998: Académica
- 1999–2000: Alverca
- 2000–2002: Portugal (assistant)
- 2003–2004: Portugal U21
- 2005–2006: Wydad
- 2007–2008: Al-Arabi Qatar
- 2009–2010: Raja Casablanca
- 2010–2011: Al-Kuwait
- 2011–2014: Al-Arabi Kuwait
- 2014–2015: Raja Casablanca
- 2015–2016: FAR Rabat
Medal record
Men's football
Representing Portugal (as manager)
UEFA European Under-21 Championship
Bronze medal – third place	2004
- * Club domestic league appearances and goals

José Pratas Romão (born 13 April 1954) is a Portuguese former football winger and manager.

== Playing career ==
Born in Beja, Alentejo, Romão started playing for local club C.D. Beja. He also represented Vitória de Guimarães, AD Fafe, F.C. Penafiel, G.D. Riopele, G.C. Alcobaça and F.C. Vizela in a 15-year professional career.

Romão spent five seasons in the Primeira Liga with Guimarães, never managing to be more than a reserve player. His last campaign at that level was 1982–83, being relegated with Alcobaça. He retired in June 1984, aged only 30.

== Coaching career ==
Romão started working as a manager immediately after retiring, being in charge as Vizela had their first experience in the top flight in 1984–85 – the team finished in the 16th and last position in the league, being immediately relegated. From the start of the 1987–88 season until the end of the 1999–2000 campaign he always worked in the Portuguese top tier, starting with Penafiel and being mainly in charge of G.D. Chaves, which he led to the fifth place in 1989–90 in a total of three stints.

In the summer of 2000, Romão joined António Oliveira's staff at the Portugal national team, holding his position until the end of the 2002 FIFA World Cup. Subsequently, he was in charge of the under-21 side, and was also the nation's manager in the ill-fated campaign at the 2004 Summer Olympics in Athens.

Romão started managing abroad in 2005 with Wydad AC, then had spells with Al-Arabi SC (Qatar), Raja CA (two), Kuwait SC and Al-Arabi SC (Kuwait). During his stint in the Moroccan Botola, he led both WAC and Raja to the national championship.
