= Hicham Mahdoufi =

Moroccan footballer (born 1983)

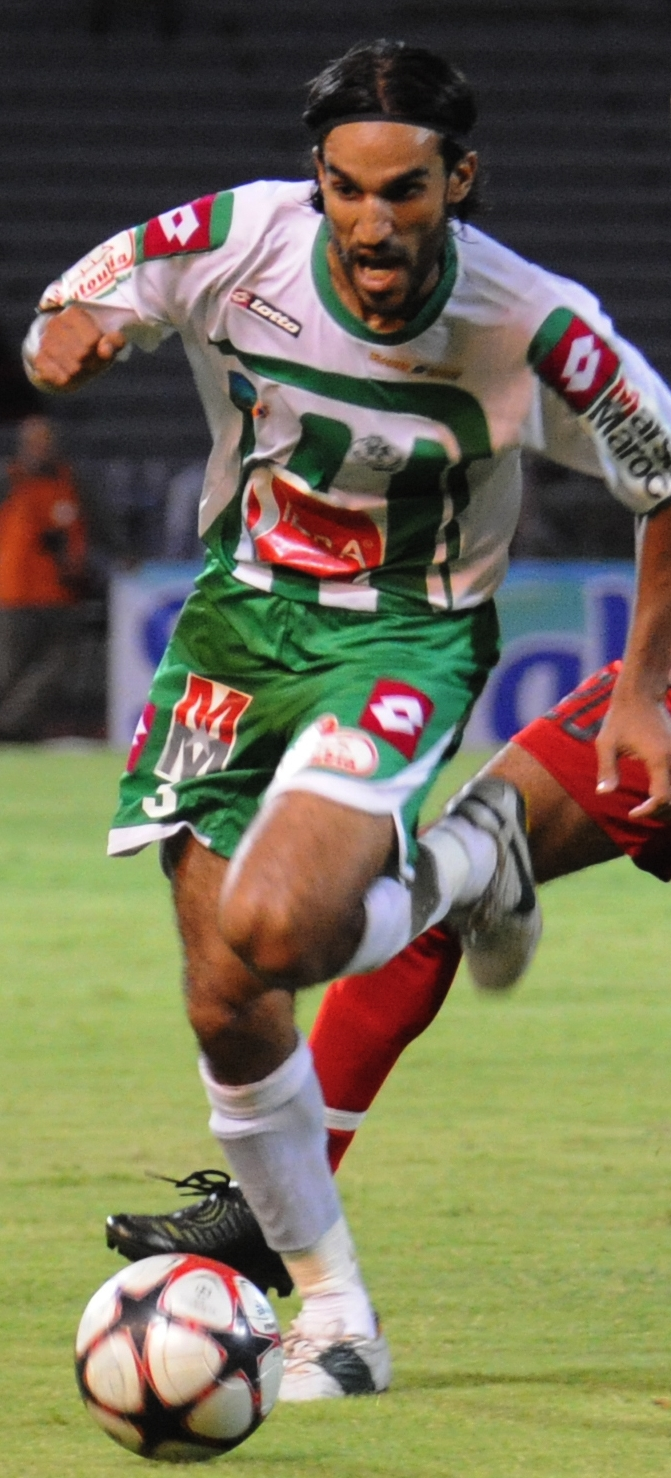
- Mahdoufi in 2010

Personal information
- Date of birth: 5 August 1983 (age 43)
- Place of birth: Khouribga, Morocco
- Height: 1.80 m (5 ft 11 in)
- Positions: Winger; left-back

Team information
- Current team: Difaa El Jadida

Youth career
- 1999–2001: Olympique Khouribga

Senior career*
Years	Team	Apps	(Gls)
2001–2010	Olympique Khouribga	92	(23)
2007	→ Dynamo Kyiv (loan)	0	(0)
2007	→ Dynamo-2 Kyiv	1	(0)
2007–2008	→ Metalist Kharkiv (loan)	4	(0)
2010–2012	Raja Casablanca	23	(0)
2012–2015	Difaa El Jadida	27	(0)

International career
2006–2010	Morocco	15	(1)
- * Club domestic league appearances and goals

Hicham Mahdoufi (born 5 August 1983, in Khouribga) is a Moroccan professional footballer.

== Career ==
Mahdoufi was born in Khouribga. During his teenage years, he began playing for his local club, Olympique Club de Khouribga. In summer 2007, a number of European clubs began taking an interest in him. In July, Mahdoufi trained with Dynamo Kyiv and on was loaned out to the club. Having played several matches for the second team, he failed to secure a place in the first team, and on 30 August Dynamo announced that Mahdoufi would be loaned to FC Metalist Kharkiv. He scored his first goal for Metalist against Everton in the UEFA Cup on 4 October 2007. On 17 June 2010, resigned his contract with his youthclub Olympique Khouribga.

== International career ==
Mahdoufi was also a member of the Morocco national football team.

== Career statistics ==
=== International ===
Appearances and goals by national team and year
National team	Year	Apps	Goals
Morocco	2006	6	1
Morocco	2007	4	0
Morocco	2008	1	0
Morocco	2009	2	0
Morocco	2010	2	0
Total		15	1

Scores and results list Morocco's goal tally first, score column indicates score after each Mahdoufi goal.

List of international goals scored by Hicham Mahdoufi
No.	Date	Venue	Opponent	Score	Result	Competition
1	15 November 2006	Prince Moulay Abdellah Stadium, Rabat, Morocco	Gabon	5–0	6–0	Friendly
