= Oumar Diop =

Guinean footballer

Personal information
- Date of birth: 12 November 1992 (age 33)
- Place of birth: Conakry, Guinea
- Height: 1.82 m (6 ft 0 in)
- Position: Right back

Team information
- Current team: Signal FC

Senior career*
| Years | Team | Apps | (Gls) |
| 2010–2012 | Raja Casablanca | 9 | (0) |
| 2012–2015 | CR Al Hoceima | 51 | (5) |
| 2015–2016 | KAC Kénitra | | |
| 2016 | Città di Scordia | | |
| 2016 | Sedan | 5 | (0) |
| 2017–2018 | FC Vernier | | |
| 2018– | Signal FC | 23 | (1) |

International career^{‡}
| 2015– | Guinea | 5 | (0) |
- * Club domestic league appearances and goals as of 20:45, 29 December 2019 (UTC) ‡ National team caps and goals as of 22:46, 2 May 2020 (UTC)

Oumar Diop (born 12 November 1992) is a Guinean professional footballer who plays as a right back for Swiss club Signal FC Bernex-Confignon. In 2015, he made five appearances for the Guinea national team.

== Career ==
Born in Conakry, Diop has played for Raja Casablanca, Chabab Rif Al Hoceima, KAC Kénitra, Città di Scordia and Sedan.

He made his international debut for Guinea in 2015.
