= Rachid Soulaimani =

Moroccan footballer

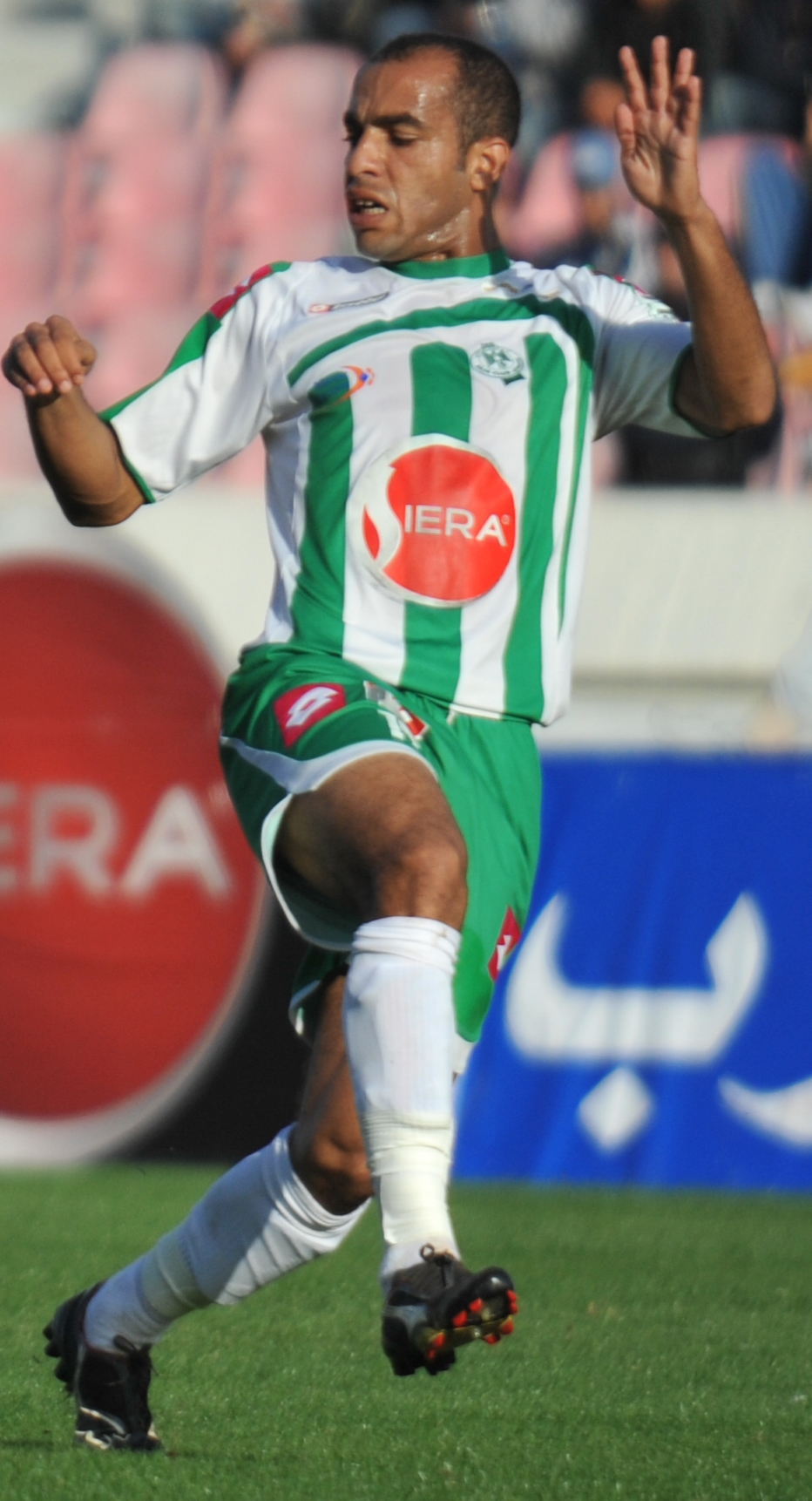
- Soulaimani with Raja Casablanca

Personal information
- Date of birth: 21 November 1982 (age 43)
- Place of birth: Oued Zam, Morocco
- Height: 1.72 m (5 ft 8 in)
- Position: Right-back

Youth career
- Raja Casablanca

Senior career*
Years	Team	Apps	(Gls)
2002–2016	Raja Casablanca		
2016–2017	RC Oued Zem		

International career
2010–2012	Morocco	9	(0)
- * Club domestic league appearances and goals

Rachid Soulaimani (born 21 November 1982) is a Moroccan former professional footballer who played as a right-back, notably for Botola club Raja Casablanca.
