= Hassan Taïr =

Moroccan footballer

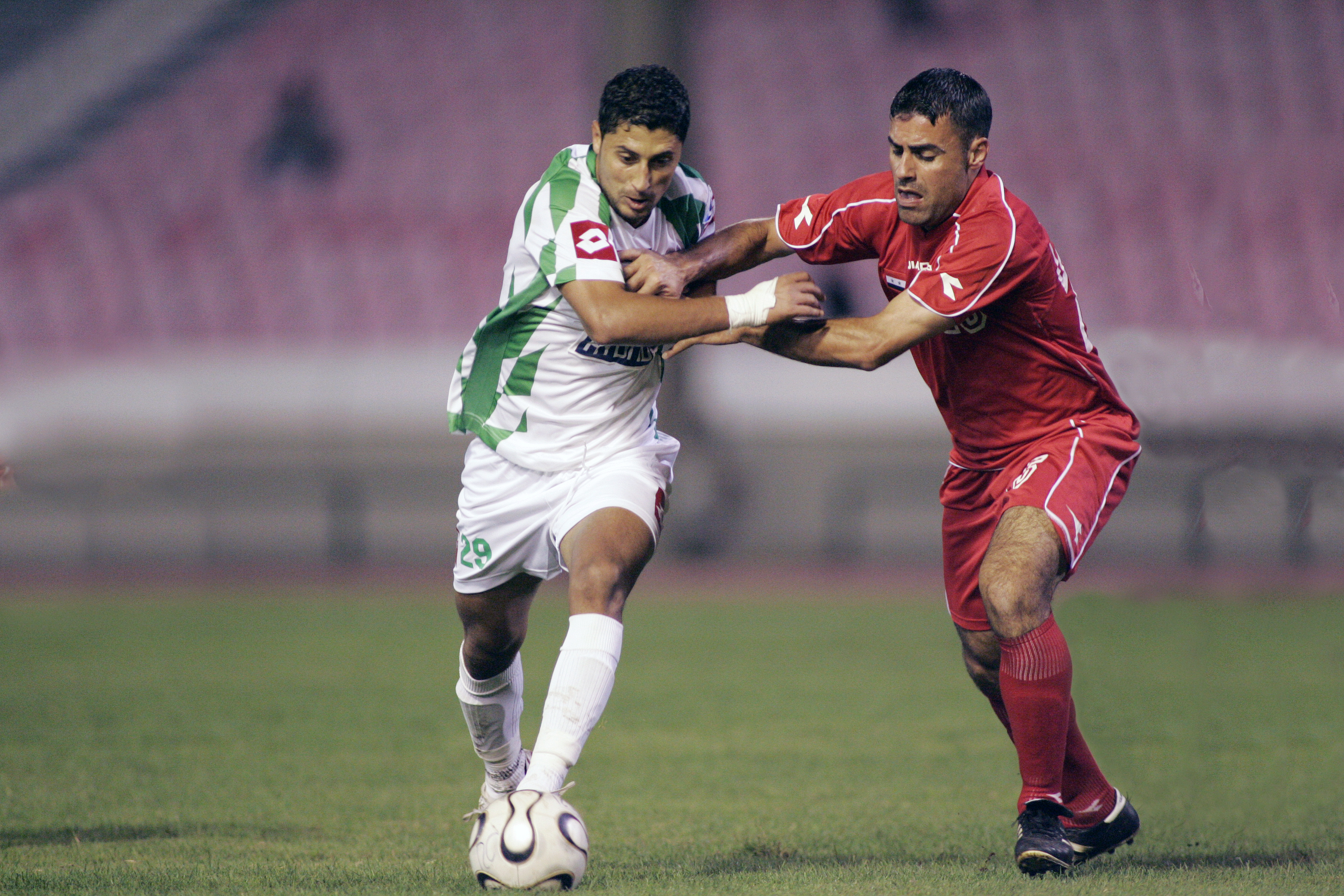

Personal information
- Full name: Hassan Taïr
- Date of birth: 12 December 1982 (age 43)
- Place of birth: Oualidia, Morocco
- Height: 1.82 m (5 ft 11 1/2 in)
- Position: Centre forward

Youth career
- 2000–2005: Renaissance de Berkane

Senior career*
| Years | Team | Apps | (Gls) |
| 2005–2006 | Renaissance de Berkane | | |
| 2006–2010 | Raja Casablanca | | |
| 2009–2010 | → Emirates Club (loan) | | |
| 2010–2012 | Raja Casablanca | 50 | (9) |
| 2012–2014 | Al-Shoalah | 7 | (5) |
| 2014–2015 | Al-Raed | 26 | (10) |

International career^{‡}
| ? | Morocco | 1 | (1) |
- * Club domestic league appearances and goals as of 22 September 2012 ‡ National team caps and goals as of 22 September 2012

Hassan Taïr (born 12 December 1982) is a Moroccan footballer who plays as a forward.

== Honours ==
=== Raja Casablanca ===
- Botola: 2009, 2011

=== Individual ===
Top scorer of the 2005-06 Moroccan Second Division with 16 goals.
