= Mohamed Fakhir =

Moroccan footballer and manager (born 1953)

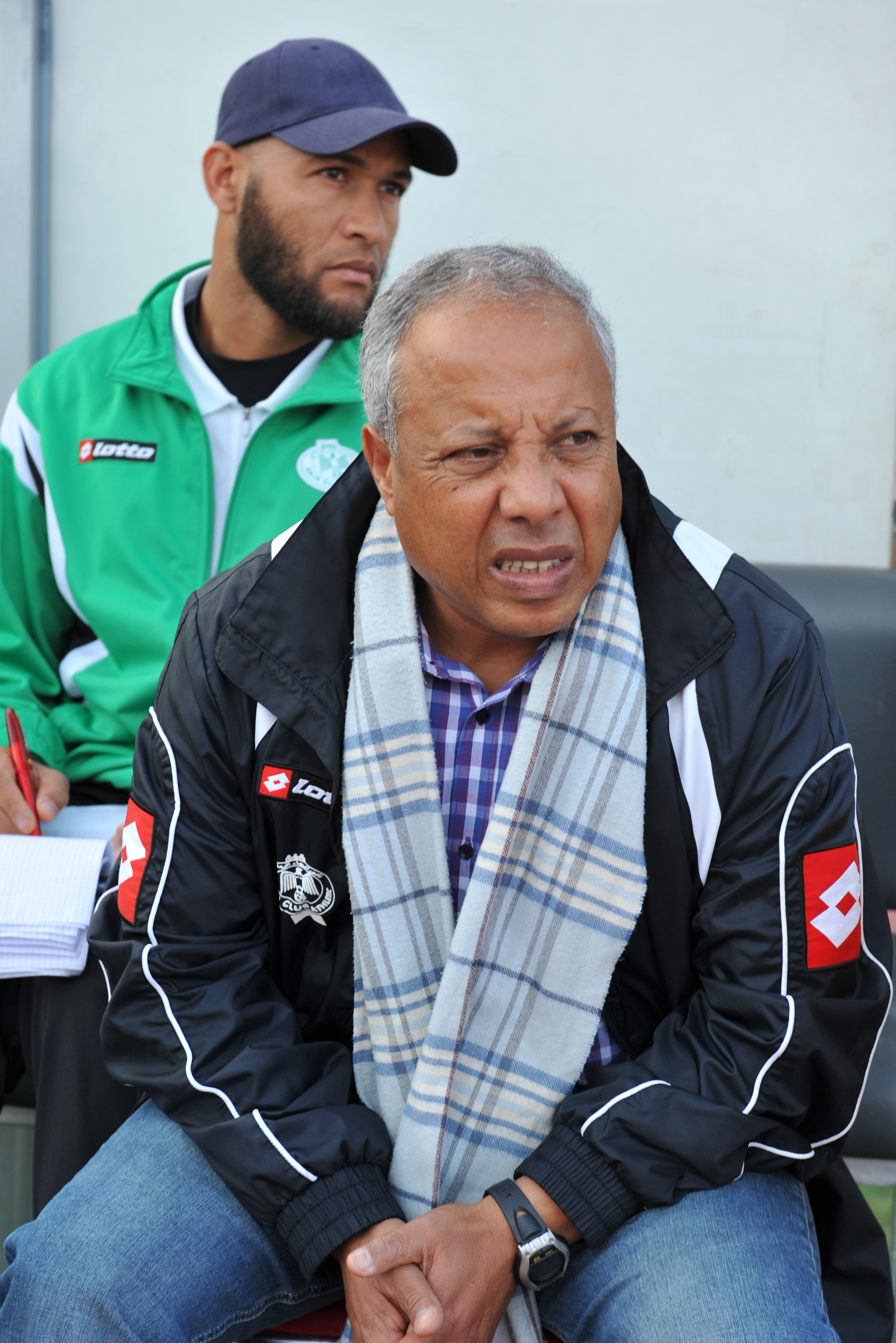
- Fakhir (front) with his assistant, Abdellatif Jrindou, in 2010

Personal information
- Date of birth: 1953 (age 72–73)
- Place of birth: Casablanca, Morocco

Team information
- Current team: Raja Casablanca

Senior career*
Years	Team	Apps	(Gls)
1972–1982	Raja Casablanca		

Managerial career
- Raja Casablanca
- Union de Sidi Kacem
- RS Settat
- Hassania Agadir
- Raja Casablanca
- 2002–2003: Hassania Agadir
- 2003: Raja Casablanca
- 2004–2005: FAR Rabat
- 2006–2007: Morocco
- 2007: Moghreb Athletic Tétouan
- 2010: Etoile du Sahel
- 2012–2013: Raja Casablanca
- 2016–2017: Raja Casablanca
- 2018: FAR Rabat
- 2019–2020: Hassania Agadir
- * Club domestic league appearances and goals

Mohamed Fakhir (born 1953) is a Moroccan football manager and former player.

He was manager of the Morocco national team, and was coach of Raja Casablanca until he was sacked in November 2013.
