= Bilal Danguir =

Moroccan footballer

Personal information
- Date of birth: 2 January 1986 (age 40)
- Place of birth: Morocco
- Height: 1.74 m (5 ft 9 in)
- Position: Forward

Team information
- Current team: Al-Baqa'a

Senior career*
Years	Team	Apps	(Gls)
2005–2009	Ittihad Tanger		
2009–2010	Wydad de Fès		
2010–2011	Raja Casablanca		
2011–2012	Chabab Rif Al Hoceima		
2012–2013	Raja Beni Mellal		
2013–2014	Ittihad Tanger		
2014–2015	Al-Taawon (UAE)		
2014–2016	Fanja		
2015–2017	Témara		
2017–2018	Union Sidi Kacem		
2018–	Al-Baqa'a		
- * Club domestic league appearances and goals as of September 2018 ‡ National team caps and goals as of September 2018

Bilal Danguir (Arabic: بلال الدنكير; born 2 January 1986) is a Moroccan footballer who currently plays for Al-Baqa'a.

== Club career ==
In August 2018, he moved to Jordanian side Al-Baqa'a. The transfer fee was undisclosed.
