= Amin Erbati =

Moroccan footballer (born 1981)

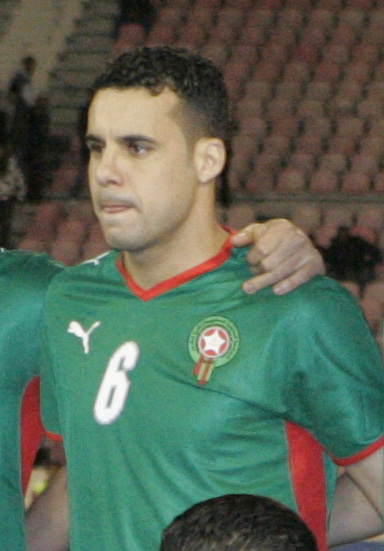

Personal information
- Full name: Elamine Erbate
- Date of birth: 1 July 1981 (age 45)
- Place of birth: Fnideq, Morocco
- Height: 1.86 m (6 ft 1 in)
- Position: Defender

Youth career
- Renaissance Martil

Senior career*
Years	Team	Apps	(Gls)
2002–2008	Raja Casablanca	?	(?)
2004–2006	→ Al Ahly Tripoli (loan)	?	(?)
2006–2007	→ Qatar (loan)	?	(?)
2007–2008	→ Al Dhafra (loan)	12	(0)
2008–2009	Marseille	4	(0)
2009–2009	Al-Wahda	9	(0)
2009–2010	Moghreb Tétouan	16	(1)
2010	Arles-Avignon	2	(0)
2011–2018	Raja Casablanca	55	(1)

International career^{‡}
2002–2009	Morocco	39	(0)
- * Club domestic league appearances and goals as of 02:38, 18 July 2013 (UTC) ‡ National team caps and goals as of 02:38, 18 July 2013 (UTC)

Elamine "Amin" Erbate, also known as Amin Erbati, (born 1 July 1981) is a Moroccan footballer. He played as a defender.

He was part of the Moroccan 2004 Olympic football team, who exited in the first round, finishing third in group D, behind group winners Iraq and runners-up Costa Rica.

He signed with French side Olympique Marseille in May 2008.

In December 2008, he signed with UAE side Al-Wahda FC.

In December 2010, he signes with Raja de Casablanca.
