= Soufiane Talal =

Moroccan footballer (born 1991)

Personal information
- Date of birth: 26 May 1991 (age 35)
- Place of birth: Casablanca, Morocco
- Height: 1.76 m (5 ft 9 in)
- Position: Attacking midfielder

Team information
- Current team: Al-Minaa
- Number: 44

Youth career
- Raja CA

Senior career*
Years	Team	Apps	(Gls)
2011–2012	Raja CA		
2012–2014	Maghreb de Fès		(1)
2014	AS Salé		
2014–2017	Hassania Agadir		(4)
2017	AS FAR		
2017–2019	CR Al Hoceima		
2019	Al-Salmiya		(1)
2020–2021	Raja Beni Mellal	4	(0)
2021–2022	Al-Najaf		(3)
2022–2023	Al-Zawraa		(0)
2023–	Al-Minaa	2	(0)

International career
	Morocco U20	2	(1)
	Morocco U23	4	(0)
- * Club domestic league appearances and goals as of 13 February 2023

Soufiane Talal (born 26 May 1991) is a Moroccan professional footballer who plays as a midfielder for Iraq Division One club Al-Minaa.

== Career ==
Talal was promoted as a player in all age teams of the Raja CA, and he previously played in his country with the Maghreb de Fès, AS Salé, Hassania Agadir and CR Al Hoceima. In January 2019, he played professionally in the Kuwait Premier League for Al-Salmiya, and returned to his country in January 2020 to sign a contract with Raja Beni Mellal.

In February 2021, Talal moved to play in the Iraqi Premier League, signing a contract with Al-Najaf. In August 2022, he signed a contract with the largest Iraqi club, Al-Zawraa.

In January 2023, Talal signed a contract with Al-Minaa, which was recently relegated to the Iraqi First Division League.

== Honours ==
Al-Minaa

- Iraqi First Division League: 2022–23
