= Lanciné Koné =

Ivorian footballer (born 1979)

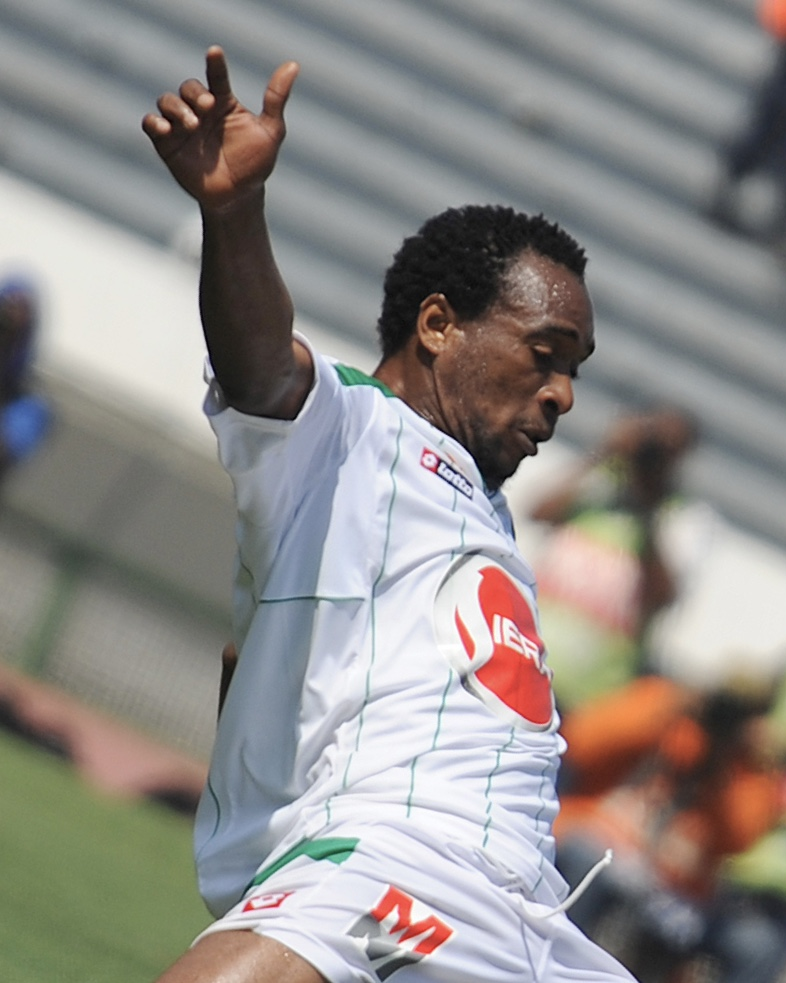
- Koné in 2011

Personal information
- Full name: Lanciné Sanogo Koné
- Date of birth: 16 June 1979 (age 47)
- Place of birth: Danané, Ivory Coast
- Height: 1.79 m (5 ft 10 in)
- Position: Attacking midfielder

Senior career*
| Years | Team | Apps | (Gls) |
| 2002–2004 | Africa Sports National | 30 | (4) |
| 2004–2006 | Issia Wazi | 50 | (28) |
| 2006–2007 | Chonburi | 20 | (9) |
| 2007–2008 | KAC Marrakech | 18 | (8) |
| 2008–2009 | Emirates Club | 19 | (12) |
| 2009–2010 | KAC Marrakech | 22 | (11) |
| 2010–2011 | Raja Casablanca | 19 | (4) |
| 2011–2012 | Deltras | 23 | (6) |
| 2012–2013 | Persisam Putra Samarinda | 27 | (19) |
| 2013–2014 | Sriwijaya | 17 | (7) |
| 2015–2016 | Persipura Jayapura | 3 | (2) |
| 2015 | → Arema Cronous (loan) | 9 | (4) |
| Total | | 257 | (114) |

International career
| 2010 | Ivory Coast | 2 | (0) |
- * Club domestic league appearances and goals

Lanciné Sanogo Koné (born 16 June 1979) is a former Ivorian professional footballer, who plays as midfielder.

== Career ==
On 1 January 2015, he signed with Persipura Jayapura.

== Honours ==
=== Club ===
Raja Casablanca

- Botola: 2010–11

=== Individual ===
- Indonesian Inter Island Cup Top Scorer: 2012
