= Samir Malcuit =

French footballer (born 1985)

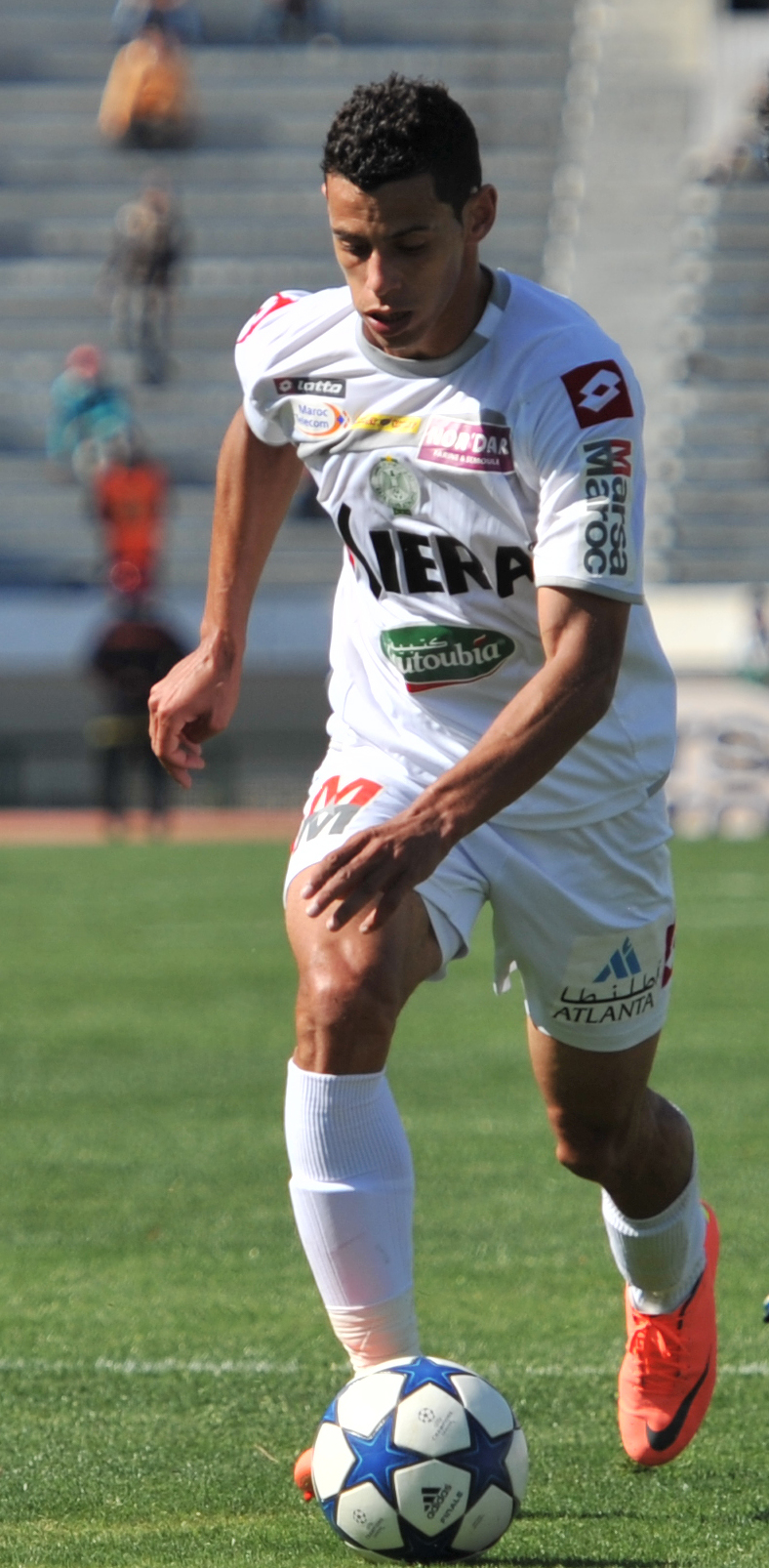
- Malcuit in 2012

Personal information
- Date of birth: 2 October 1985 (age 41)
- Place of birth: Montbéliard, France
- Height: 1.85 m (6 ft 1 in)
- Position: Forward

Senior career*
Years	Team	Apps	(Gls)
2003–2010	Racing Paris		
2010–2011	Marseille B		
2011–2012	Raja Casablanca		
2012–2015	MAS Fez		
2015–2016	Dhofar		
2016–2018	US Ivry	41	(12)
2018–2019	Poitiers	18	(3)
- * Club domestic league appearances and goals

Samir Malcuit (born 2 October 1985) is a French former professional footballer who played as a forward.

== Career ==
Malcuit was born in Montbéliard. After scoring 17 goals in the 2009–10 Championnat de France Amateur for Racing Paris, he was spotted by José Anigo and signed to the Marseille reserves on an amateur contract. At Marseille B, managed by Franck Passi, he played in the Division d'Honneur and in the Championnat de France Amateur 2, while training and appearing in friendly matches with the first team.

Malcuit then played for Raja Casablanca, scoring four goals in two matches before sustaining injuries. After moving to MAS Fez he suffered a cruciate ligament rupture. He spent six months with Dhofar in Oman.

In summer 2016 a return to Morocco with JS Kasbah Tadla was aborted and Malcuit signed with US Ivry in Championnat de France Amateur 2 in autumn.

In October 2018 33-year-old Malcuit joined Poitiers in Championnat National 3.

In 2022 Malcuit settled in Nyon, Switzerland, where he initially trained with FC Italia Nyon. In summer 2023 he signed with nearby FC Bursins-Rolle-Perroy. By June 2024 the 38-year-old had scored 17 goals and contributed 6 assists for the club in the 3. Liga (Switzerland), the country's seventh tier.

== Personal life ==
His brother Kévin is also a professional footballer. His younger brother Enzo has also played football. Malcuit is of Moroccan and Mauritanian descent.
