= Bouchaib El Moubarki =

Moroccan footballer

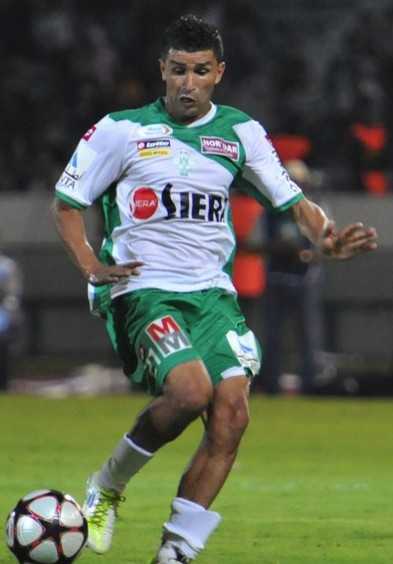

Personal information
- Full name: Bouchaïb El Moubarki
- Date of birth: 12 January 1978 (age 48)
- Place of birth: Casablanca, Morocco
- Height: 1.76 m (5 ft 9 in)
- Position: Forward

Senior career*
Years	Team	Apps	(Gls)
1997	Rachad Bernoussi		
1997–2001	Raja Casablanca	57	(32)
2001–2003	Al-Sadd	17	(14)
2003	Al-Ahli		(6)
2003–2004	Al Rayyan	16	(13)
2004	Al Wasl FC		(2)
2004–2005	Al Wakra	15	(6)
2005-2006	Raja Casablanca	11	(5)
2006–2007	Al Rayyan	25	(11)
2007	Al-Arabi(loan)	10	(3)
2007–2009	Grenoble	35	(2)
2009–2010	Moghreb Tétouan	14	(0)
2010–2012	Raja Casablanca	43	(9)

International career^{‡}
2000–2008	Morocco	27	(4)
- * Club domestic league appearances and goals as of 16 February 2022 ‡ National team caps and goals as of 16 February 2022

Bouchaib El Moubarki (Arabic: بوشعيب المباركي; born 12 January 1978) is a former Moroccan footballer.

== Club career ==
He also played for the famous Qatari side, Al-Sadd Sports Club and Grenoble. El Moubarki was a participant in the 2000 FIFA Club World Championship, during which he scored a goal against Saudi Arabian club Al-Nassr FC and was sent off in the match against Real Madrid after clashing with Guti. in 2004 he had a short move to Al Wasl FC which ended prematurely due to not being fit.

== International career ==
El Moubarki is a member of the Morocco national football team. He was part of the Moroccan 2004 Olympic football team, who exited in the first round, finishing third in group D, behind group winners Iraq and runners-up Costa Rica. He also competed at the 2000 Summer Olympics in Sydney.

== Career statistics ==
=== International ===
==== International goals ====
Scores and results list Morocco's goal tally first, score column indicates score after each El Moubarki goal.

List of international goals scored by Bouchaib El Moubarki
No.	Date	Venue	Opponent	Score	Result	Competition
1	9 April 2000	Independence Stadium, Banjul, Gambia	Gambia	1–0	1-0	2002 FIFA World Cup qualification
2	15 November 2006	Stade Moulay Abdellah, Rabat, Morocco	Gabon	1–0	6–0	Friendly
3	15 November 2006	Stade Moulay Abdellah, Rabat, Morocco	Gabon	3–0	6–0	Friendly
4	16 June 2007	Kamazu Stadium, Blantyre, Malawi	Malawi	1–0	1-0	2008 Africa Cup of Nations qualification
