= Hassan Souari =

Moroccan footballer

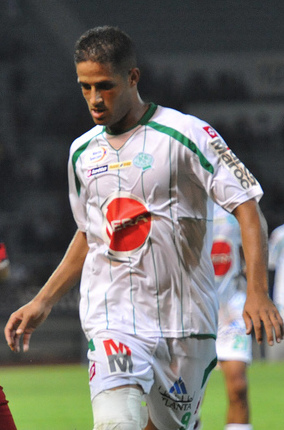

Personal information
- Date of birth: December 24, 1984 (age 41)
- Place of birth: Settat, Morocco
- Height: 1.82 m (5 ft 11 1/2 in)
- Position: Striker

Team information
- Current team: Hassania Agadir

Senior career*
Years	Team	Apps	(Gls)
2002–2004	Settat		
2004–2008	Khouribga	22	(8)
2006–2007	→ Istres (loan)	27	(3)
2009	FK Baku	0	(0)
2009	Hatta Club		
2010–2011	Olympique Safi	28	(6)
2011–2012	Raja Casablanca	13	(1)
2012–2013	Nahdat Berkane	7	(0)
2013–2014	Difaâ El Jadida	9	(0)
2014–	Hassania Agadir	5	(0)

International career
2006	Morocco	3	(1)
- * Club domestic league appearances and goals

Hassan Souari (Arabic: حسن صواري) (born 24 December 1984 in Settat) is a Moroccan footballer, who currently plays for Hassania Agadir.

== International career ==
He made his debut for Morocco against Mali, friendly, 28 May 2006. And scored goal in the second match against Gabon.
