= Raja CA in international football =

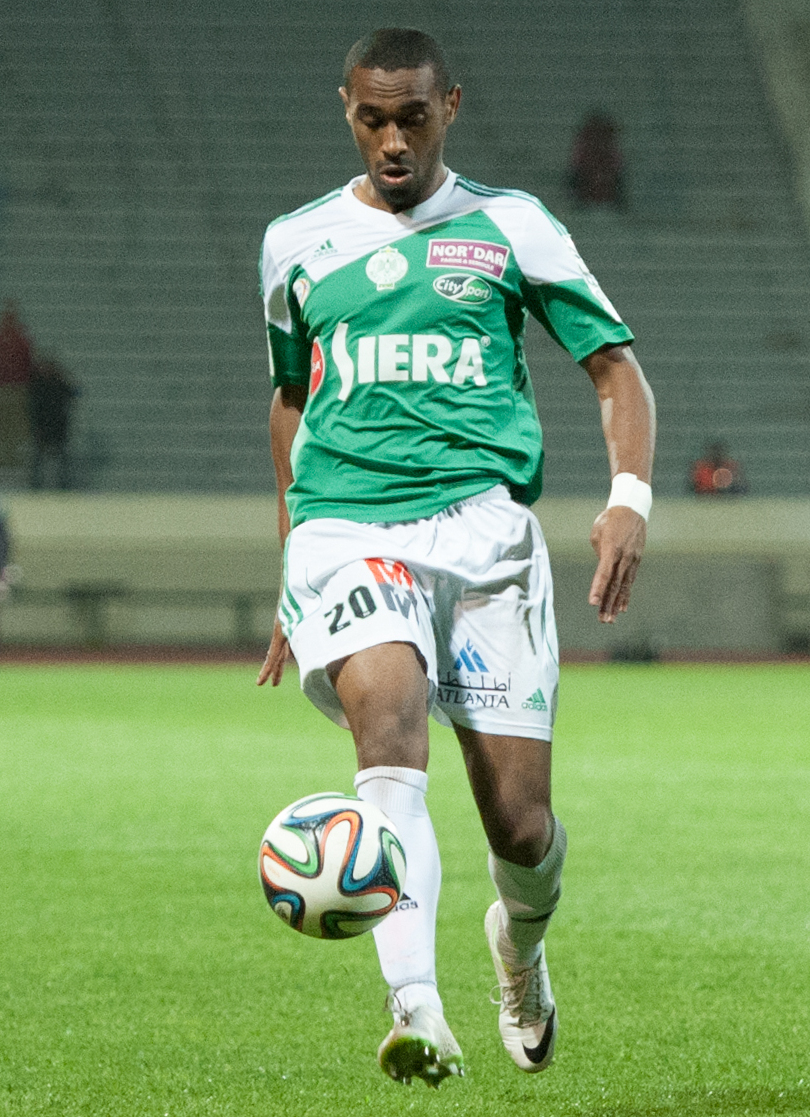
- Mouhcine Iajour, pictured here in February 2014, is Raja CA's all-time leading goalscorer in international competitions with 25 goals
- Club: (Morocco) Raja CA
- Most appearances: Anas Zniti (93)
- Top scorer: Mouhcine Iajour (25)
- First entry: 1983 African Cup Winners' Cup
- Latest entry: 2026–27 CAF Confederation Cup

Titles
- Champions League: 3: 1989; 1997; 1999
- Confederation Cup: 2: 2018; 2020-21
- CAF Cup: 1: 2003
- Super Cup: 2: 2000; 2019
- Afro-Asian Cup: 1: 1998

Raja Club Athletic (Arabic: نادي الرجاء الرياضي, romanized: Nādī ar–Rajāʾ ar–Riyāḍī) is a professional sports club based in Casablanca, Morocco. They played their first ever international match on 17 September 1950 in the North African Cup and won by walkover. The club played in a CAF-organized competition for the first time in 1983 and took part in the now-defunct African Cup Winners' Cup as Throne Cup winners and lost 1–0 on aggregate to Senegalese side ASF Police. It was their only participation in this competition. Raja CA is the Moroccan club with the most African appearances.

Raja CA won the Champions League three times in 1989, 1997 and 1999. They also won the last edition of the CAF Cup in 2003 before it was merged with the African Cup Winners' Cup, the Confederation Cup in 2018 and 2021, the Super Cup in 2000 and 2019, the Afro-Asian Cup in 1998, the Arab Club Champions Cup in 2006 and 2021 and the UNAF Club Cup in 2015. Raja has also participated in two FIFA Club World Cups with their best performance being the second place in 2013. Raja CA, with 12 trophies, is the most successful team in Morocco and the third in Africa in international club football.

In the tables (N) symbolises neutral ground, (a) away goals and (P) penalty shoot-out. The first score is always Raja CA's.

== CAF Competitions ==
=== C1, C2 & C3 ===
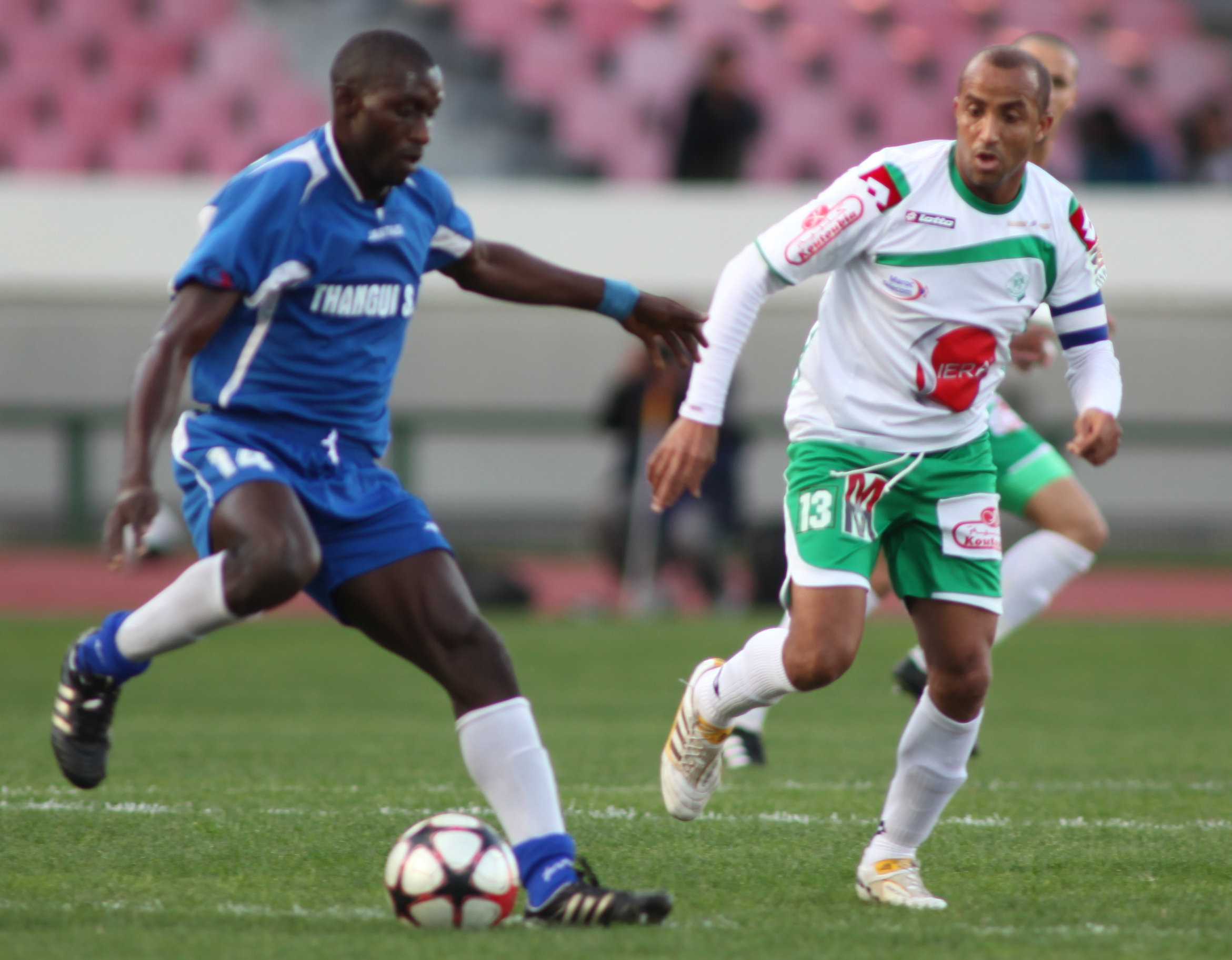
Omar Nejjary against Fello Star in the 2010 Champions League

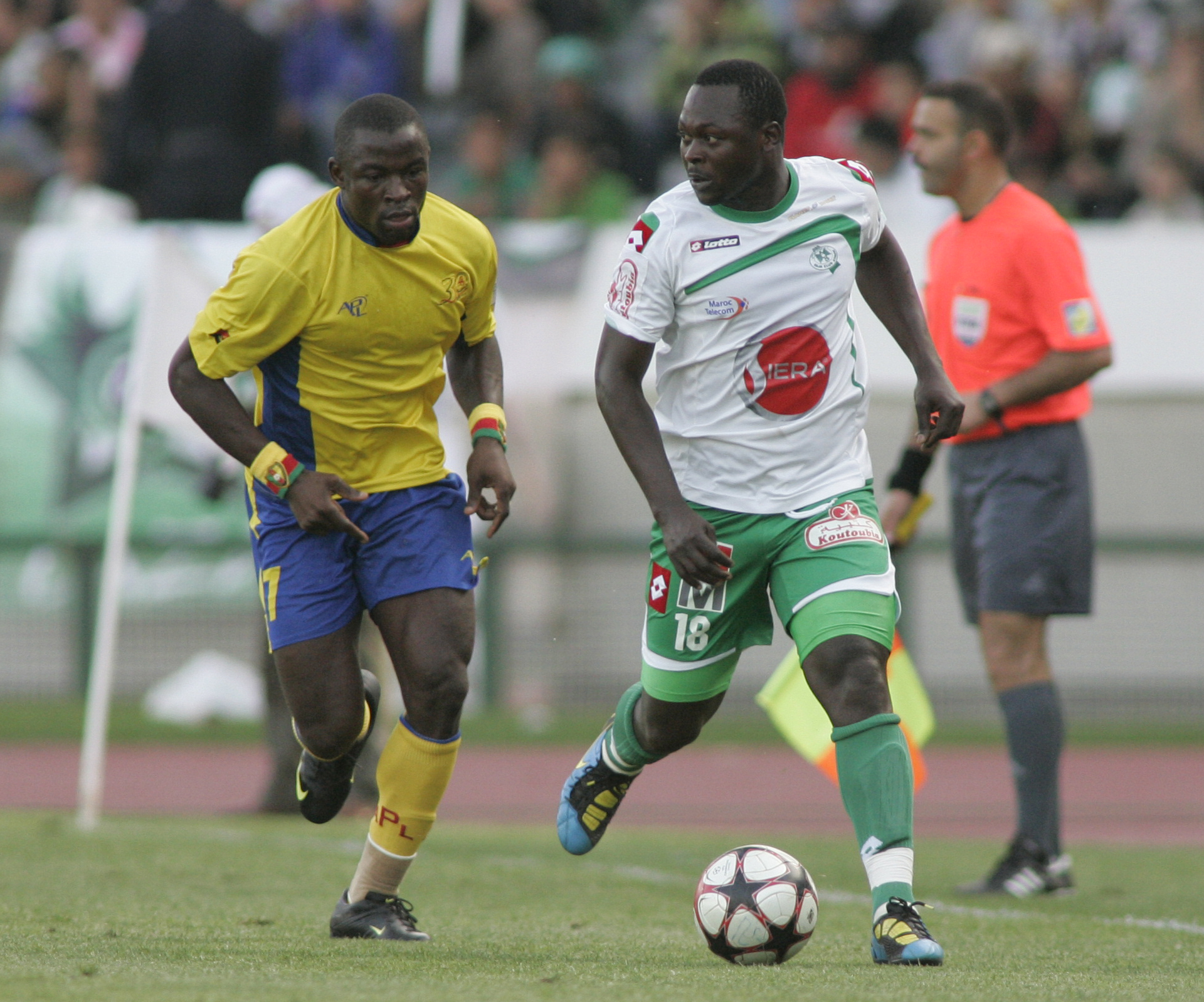
Pape Ciré Dia against Petro de Luanda in the 2010 Champions League

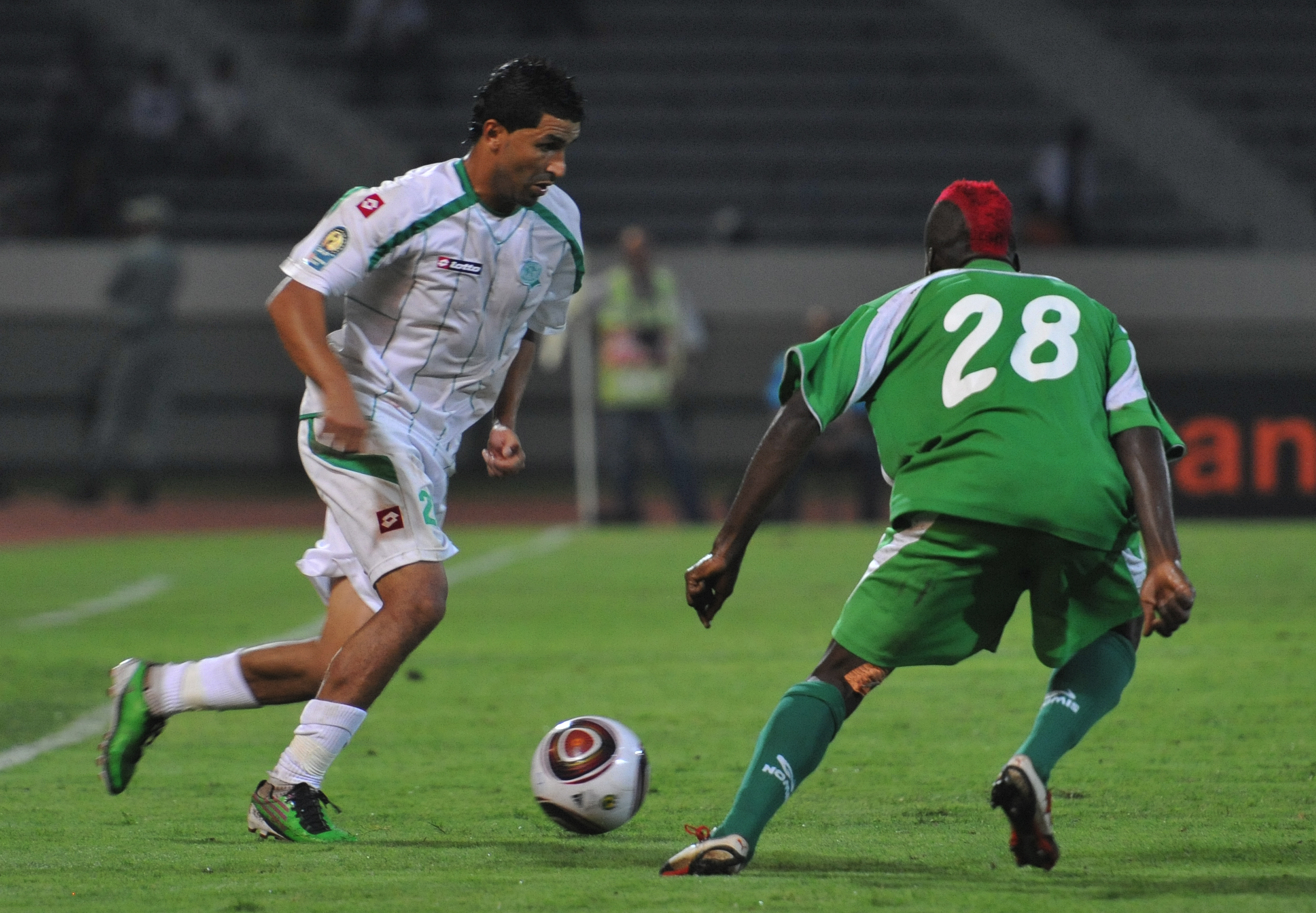
Bouchaib El Moubarki against Coton Sport in the 2011 Champions League

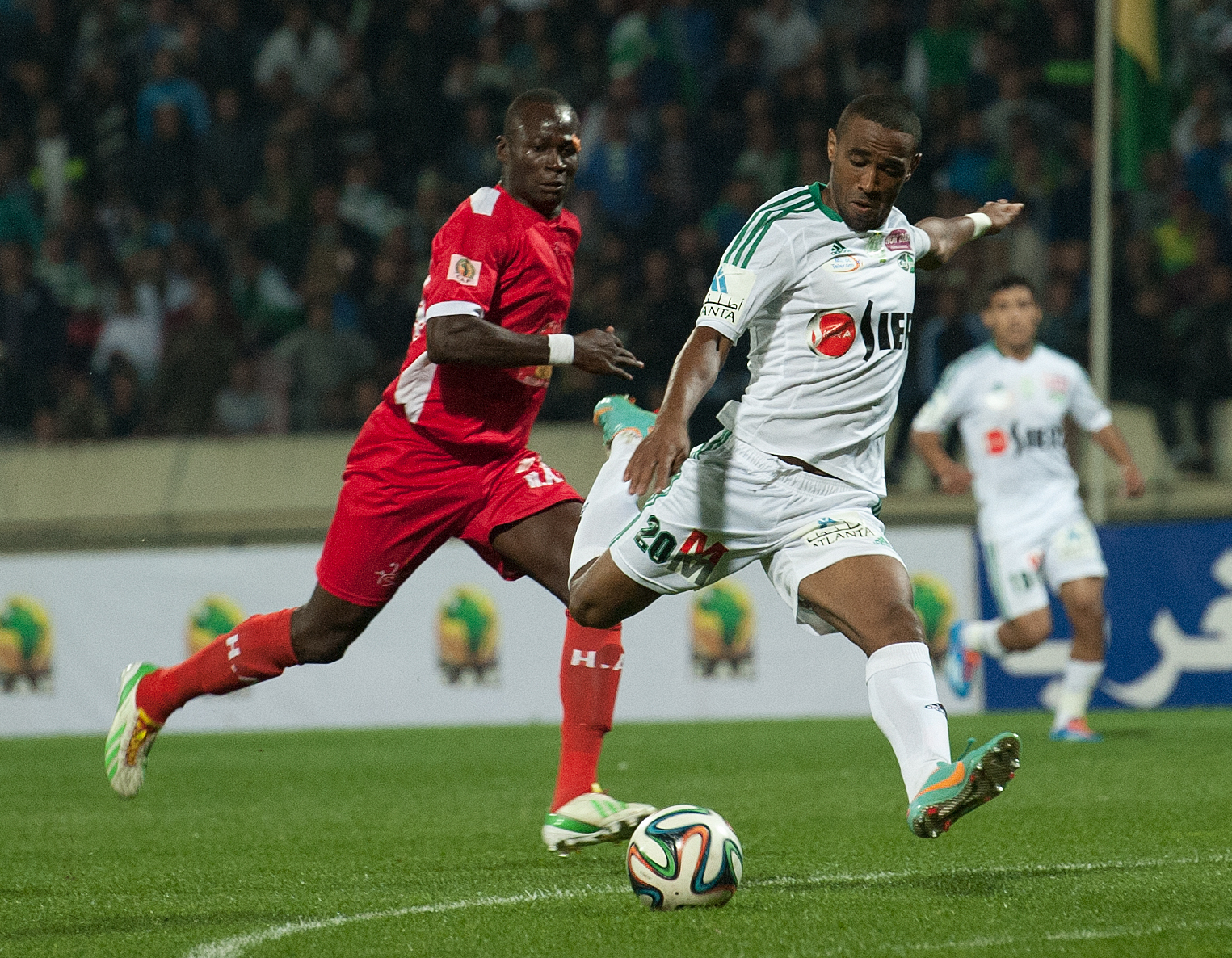
Mouhcine Iajour against Horoya AC in the 2014 Champions League

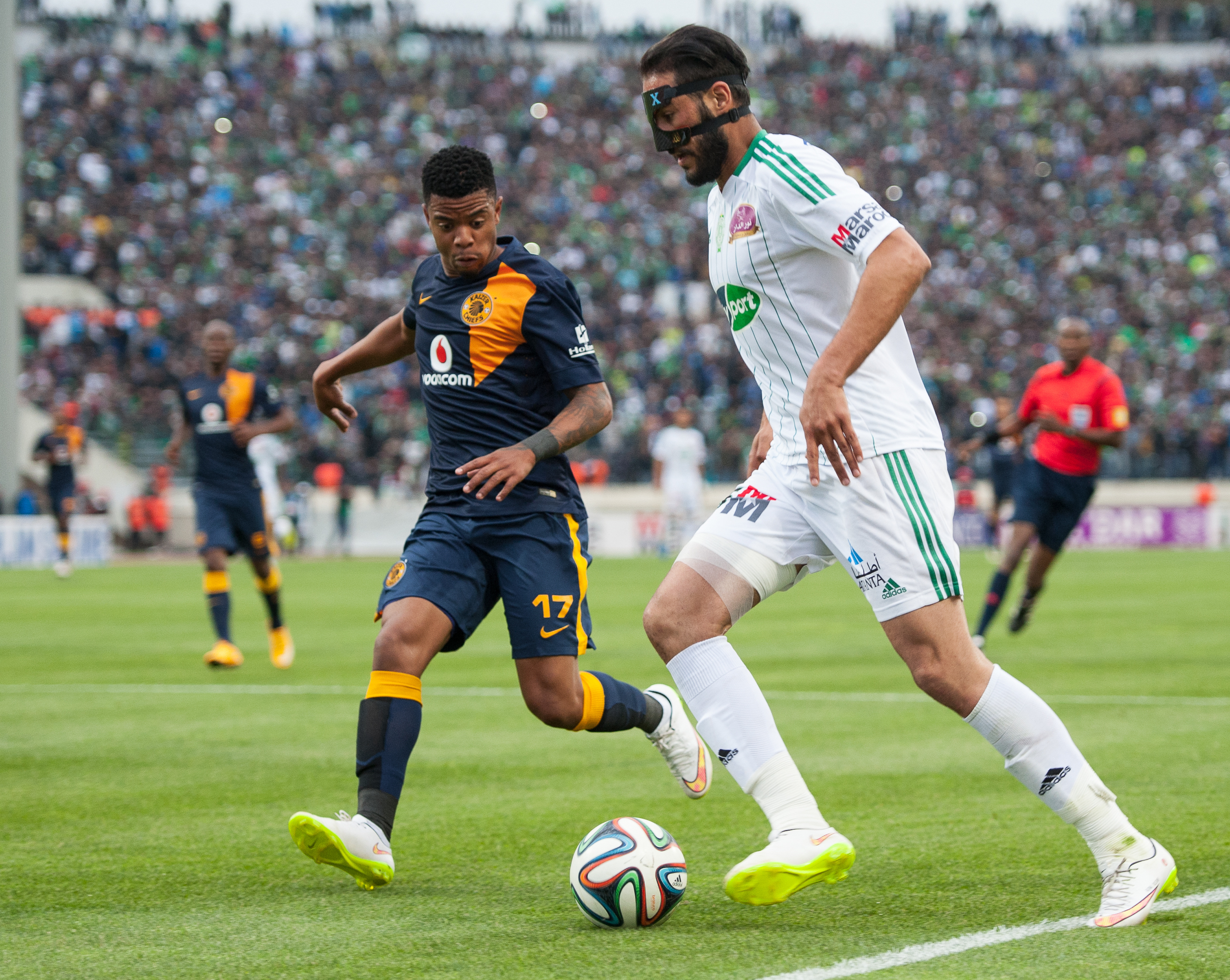
Yassine Salhi against Kaizer Chiefs in the 2015 Champions League

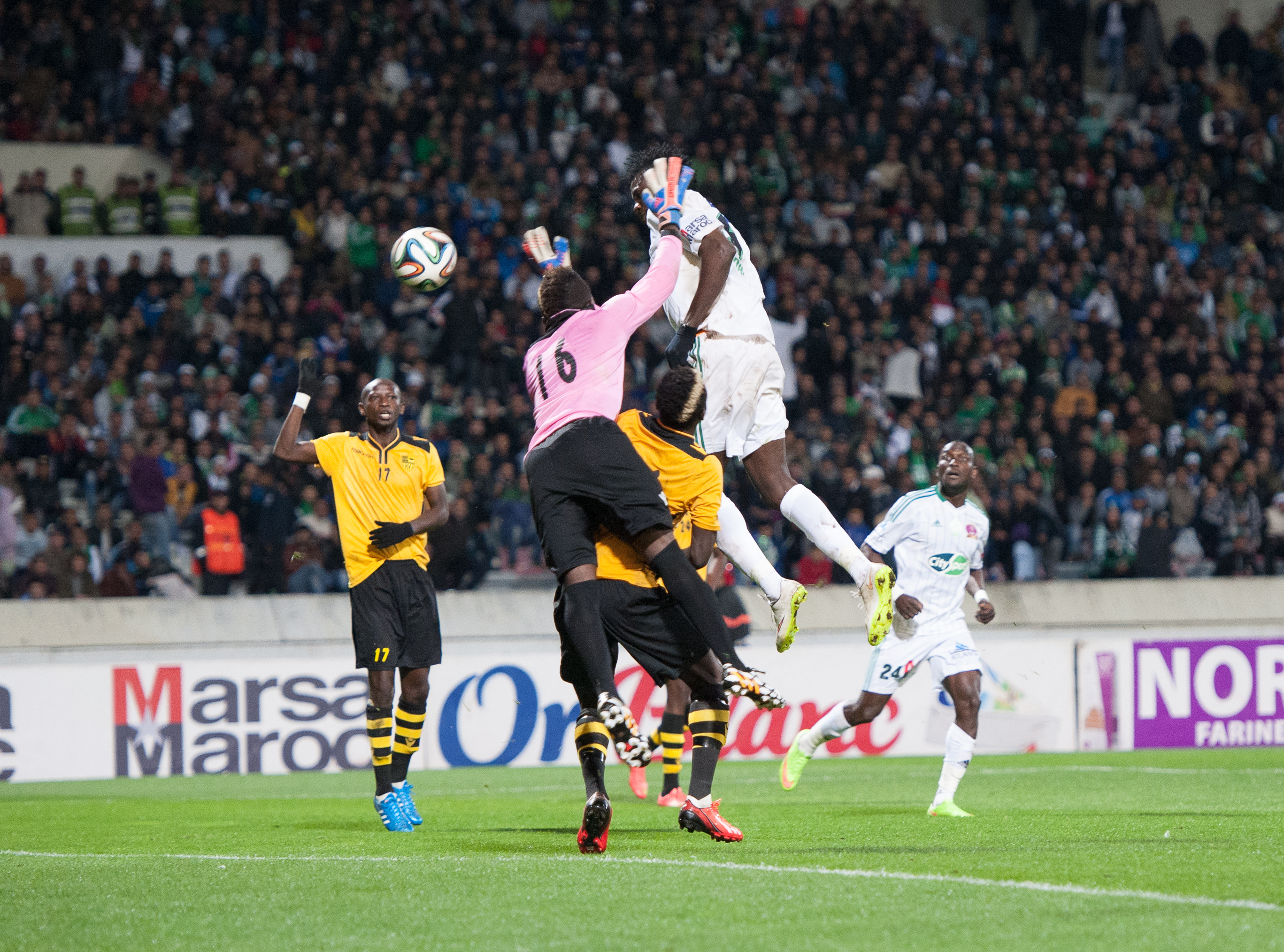
Christian Osaguona scoring the second goal against Diables Noirs in the 2015 Champions League

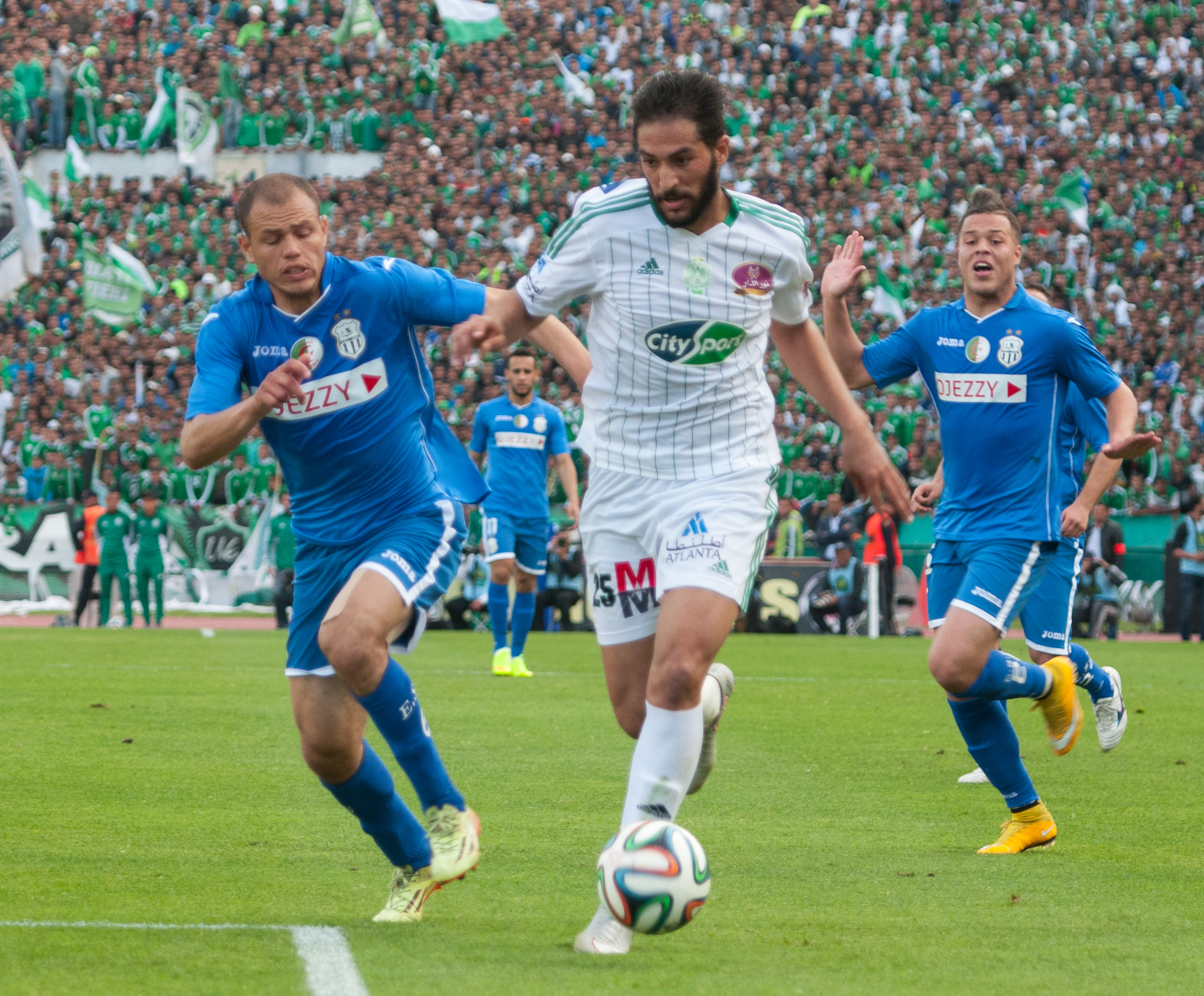
Yassine Salhi against ES Sétif in the 2015 Champions League

Season	Competition	Round	Opposition	Home	Away	Aggregate	Ref.
1983	African Cup Winners' Cup	First round	(Senegal) ASF Police	0–0	0–1	0–1	
1989	African Cup of Champions Clubs	First round	(Senegal) ASC Jeanne d'Arc	2–0	0–1	2–1	
1989	African Cup of Champions Clubs	Second round	(Gabon) JAC Port–Gentil	0–0	1–1	1–1 (a)	
1989	African Cup of Champions Clubs	Quarter–final	(Republic of the Congo) Inter Club Brazzaville	2–0	0–1	2–1	
1989	African Cup of Champions Clubs	Semi–final	(Cameroon) Tonnerre Yaoundé	2–0	2–2	4–2	
1989	African Cup of Champions Clubs	Final	(Algeria) MC Oran	1–0	0–1	1–1 (2–4 p)	
1990	African Cup of Champions Clubs	First round	(Liberia) Mighty Barolle	2–0	1–2	3–2	
1990	African Cup of Champions Clubs	Second round	(Cameroon) RC Bafoussam	w/o (Note: Some RC Bafoussam players took part in the 1990 World Cup, so Raja accepted the postponement of the match. CAF reschedules the first leg for July 25, a date which does not correspond to the club's calendar. Raja refused to travel to Cameroon and was disqualified.)			
1997	CAF Champions League	First round	(Senegal) SONACOS	3–1	2–0	5–1	
1997	CAF Champions League	Second round	(Gabon) Mbilinga FC	3–0	1–1	4–1	
1997	CAF Champions League	Group stage	(Algeria) USM Alger	0–2	2–2	1st place	
1997	CAF Champions League	Group stage	(Angola) Primeiro de Agosto	4–0	1–1	1st place	
1997	CAF Champions League	Group stage	(South Africa) Orlando Pirates	1–0	2–1	1st place	
1997	CAF Champions League	Final	(Ghana) Obuasi Goldfields	1–0	0–1	1–1 (5–4 p)	
1998	CAF Champions League	First round	(Benin) Mogas 90 FC	6–0	0–0	6–0	
1998	CAF Champions League	Second round	(Senegal) AS Douanes	2–0	1–2	3–2	
1998	CAF Champions League	Group stage	(Ivory Coast) ASEC Mimosas	0–1	1–1	3rd place	
1998	CAF Champions League	Group stage	(South Africa) Manning Rangers	2–1	0–1	3rd place	
1998	CAF Champions League	Group stage	(Tanzania) Young Africans	6–0	3–3	3rd place	
1999	CAF Champions League	First round	(Senegal) ASEC Ndiambour	4–0	0–1	4–1	
1999	CAF Champions League	Second round	(Mali) Djoliba AC	2–1	1–2	3–3 (7–6 p)	
1999	CAF Champions League	Group stage	(Ghana) Hearts of Oak	1–0	0–0	1st place	
1999	CAF Champions League	Group stage	(Egypt) Al Ahly	1–1	1–0	1st place	
1999	CAF Champions League	Group stage	(Nigeria) Shooting Stars	1–0	0–1	1st place	
1999	CAF Champions League	Final	(Tunisia) Espérance de Tunis	0–0	0–0	0–0 (4–2 p)	
2000	CAF Champions League	First round	(Benin) Dragons de l'Ouémé	3–1	2–2	5–3	
2000	CAF Champions League	Second round	(Senegal) ASC Jeanne d'Arc	2–1	0–1	2–2 (a)	
2001	CAF Champions League	First round	(Burkina Faso) USFA Ouagadougou	2–0	1–3	3–3 (a)	
2001	CAF Champions League	Second round	(Democratic Republic of the Congo) TP Mazembe	2–1	0–2	2–3	
2002	CAF Champions League	First round	(The Gambia) Wallidan FC	2–1	3–1	5–2	
2002	CAF Champions League	Second round	(Republic of the Congo) Étoile du Congo	3–0	2–3	5–3	
2002	CAF Champions League	Group stage	(Democratic Republic of the Congo) TP Mazembe	1–0	0–2	1st place	
2002	CAF Champions League	Group stage	(Egypt) Al Ahly	2–1	3–3	1st place	
2002	CAF Champions League	Group stage	(Senegal) ASC Jeanne d'Arc	2–1	2–1	1st place	
2002	CAF Champions League	Semi–final	(Ivory Coast) ASEC Mimosas	4–0	0–2	4–2	
2002	CAF Champions League	Final	(Egypt) Zamalek	0–0	0–1	0–1	
2003	CAF Cup	First round	(Burkina Faso) Étoile Filante	4–0	3–2	7–2	
2003	CAF Cup	Second round	(Gabon) FC 105 Libreville	6–1	1–2	7–3	
2003	CAF Cup	Quarter–final	(Zimbabwe) Black Rhinos	5–1	1–1	6–2	
2003	CAF Cup	Semi–final	(Nigeria) Enugu Rangers	4–1	0–2	4–3	
2003	CAF Cup	Final	(Cameroon) Cotonsport Garoua	2–0	0–0	2–0	
2004	CAF Champions League	First round	(Senegal) ASC Jeanne d'Arc	2–0	0–2	2–2 (4–5 p)	
2005	CAF Champions League	First round	(Democratic Republic of the Congo) DC Motema Pembe	2–0	1–1	3–1	
2005	CAF Champions League	Second round	(Ivory Coast) Africa Sports	1–0	1–1	2–1	
2005	CAF Champions League	Group stage	(Egypt) Al Ahly	1–1	0–1	2nd place	
2005	CAF Champions League	Group stage	(South Africa) Ajax Cape Town	1–1	3–0	2nd place	
2005	CAF Champions League	Group stage	(Nigeria) Enyimba	1–0	0–2	2nd place	
2005	CAF Champions League	Semi–final	(Tunisia) Étoile du Sahel	0–1	0–1	0–2	
2006	CAF Champions League	Preliminary round	(Mauritania) ASC El Ahmedi	w/o (Note: ASC El Ahmedi withdrew and Raja advanced to the next round)			
2006	CAF Champions League	First round	(Zimbabwe) CAPS United	1–0	w/o (Note: CAPS United were ejected after the first leg for giving false information about two Malawian players in their first round match against AS Inter Star. AS Inter Star were re-instated.)		
2006	CAF Champions League	First round	(Burundi) AS Inter Star	7–0	1–2	8–2	
2006	CAF Champions League	Second round	(Algeria) JS Kabylie	1–0	1–3	2–3	
2006	CAF Confederation Cup	Play–off round	(Tunisia) Espérance de Tunis	0–0	0–2	0–2	
2010	CAF Champions League	Preliminary round	(Guinea) Fello Star	1–1	3–1	4–2	
2010	CAF Champions League	First round	(Angola) Petro de Luanda	1–1	0–1	1–2	
2011	CAF Champions League	Preliminary round	(Chad) Tourbillon	10–1	w/o (Note: Tourbillon withdrew after the first leg.)		
2011	CAF Champions League	First round	(Mali) Stade Malien	1–0	1–2	2–2	
2011	CAF Champions League	Second round	(Ivory Coast) ASEC Mimosas	1–1 (5–4 p) (Note: The match was scheduled to be played over one leg in Casablanca due to the political situation in Côte d'Ivoire)			
2011	CAF Champions League	Group stage	(Ghana) Cotonsport Garoua	0–0	1–2	4th place	
2011	CAF Champions League	Group stage	(Sudan) Al–Hilal	0–0	0–1	4th place	
2011	CAF Champions League	Group stage	(Nigeria) Enyimba	0–0	0–2	4th place	
2012	CAF Champions League	First round	(Ghana) Berekum Chelsea	3–0	0–5	3–5	
2014	CAF Champions League	Preliminary round	(Sierra Leone) Diamond Stars	6–0	2–1	8–2	
2014	CAF Champions League	First round	(Guinea) Horoya AC	1–0	0–1	1–1 (4–5 p)	
2015	CAF Champions League	Preliminary round	(Republic of the Congo) Diables Noirs	4–0	2–2	6–2	
2015	CAF Champions League	First round	(South Africa) Kaizer Chiefs	2–0	1–0	3–0	
2015	CAF Champions League	Second round	(Algeria) ES Sétif	2–2	2–2	4–4 (1–4 p)	
2015	CAF Confederation Cup	Play–off round	(Tunisia) Étoile du Sahel	2–0	0–3	2–3	
2018	CAF Confederation Cup	First round	(Mauritania) FC Nouadhibou	1–1	4–2	5–3	
2018	CAF Confederation Cup	Play–off round	(Zambia) Zanaco	3–0	2–0	5–0	
2018	CAF Confederation Cup	Group stage	(Democratic Republic of the Congo) AS Vita Club	0–0	0–2	1st place	
2018	CAF Confederation Cup	Group stage	(Ghana) Aduana Stars	6–0	3–3	1st place	
2018	CAF Confederation Cup	Group stage	(Ivory Coast) ASEC Mimosas	4–0	1–0	1st place	
2018	CAF Confederation Cup	Quarter–final	(Republic of the Congo) CARA Brazzaville	1–0	2–1	3–1	
2018	CAF Confederation Cup	Semi–final	(Nigeria) Enyimba	2–1	1–0	3–1	
2018	CAF Confederation Cup	Final	(Democratic Republic of the Congo) AS Vita Club	3–0	1–3	4–3	
2018–19	CAF Confederation Cup	First round	(Gabon) Cercle Mbéri Sportif	5–0	0–1	5–1	
2018–19	CAF Confederation Cup	Play–off round	(Namibia) African Stars	1–0	1–1	2–1	
2018–19	CAF Confederation Cup	Group stage	(Morocco) Hassania Agadir	0–0	1–1	3rd place	
2018–19	CAF Confederation Cup	Group stage	(Republic of the Congo) AS Otôho	0–0	4–1	3rd place	
2018–19	CAF Confederation Cup	Group stage	(Morocco) RS Berkane	2–4	0–0	3rd place	
2019–20	CAF Champions League	Preliminary round	(The Gambia) Brikama United	4–0	3–3	7–3	
2019–20	CAF Champions League	First round	(Libya) Al Nasr	1–1	3–1	4–2	
2019–20	CAF Champions League	Group stage	(Tunisia) Espérance de Tunis	0–2	2–2	2nd place	
2019–20	CAF Champions League	Group stage	(Democratic Republic of the Congo) AS Vita Club	1–0	1–0	2nd place	
2019–20	CAF Champions League	Group stage	(Algeria) JS Kabylie	2–0	0–0	2nd place	
2019–20	CAF Champions League	Quarter–final	(Democratic Republic of the Congo) TP Mazembe	2–0	0–1	2–1	
2019–20	CAF Champions League	Semi–final	(Egypt) Zamalek	0–1	1–3	1–4	
2020–21	CAF Champions League	First round	(Senegal) Teungueth	0–0	0–0	0–0 (1–3 p)	
2020–21	CAF Confederation Cup	Play–off round	(Tunisia) US Monastir	1–0	0–1	1–1 (6–5 p)	
2020–21	CAF Confederation Cup	Group stage	(Tanzania) Namungo	1–0	3–0	1st place	
2020–21	CAF Confederation Cup	Group stage	(Zambia) Nkana	2–0	2–0	1st place	
2020–21	CAF Confederation Cup	Group stage	(Egypt) Pyramids	2–0	3–0	1st place	
2020–21	CAF Confederation Cup	Quarter–final	(South Africa) Orlando Pirates	4–0	1–1	5–1	
2020–21	CAF Confederation Cup	Semi–final	(Egypt) Pyramids	0–0	0–0	0–0 (5–4 p)	
2020–21	CAF Confederation Cup	Final	(Algeria) JS Kabylie	2–1 (N)			
2021–22	CAF Champions League	Second round	(Liberia) LPRC Oilers	2–0	2–0	4–0	
2021–22	CAF Champions League	Group stage	(Algeria) ES Sétif	1–0	1–0	1st place	
2021–22	CAF Champions League	Group stage	(South Africa) AmaZulu	1–0	2–0	1st place	
2021–22	CAF Champions League	Group stage	(Guinea) Horoya AC	1–0	1–2	1st place	
2021–22	CAF Champions League	Quarter–final	(Egypt) Al Ahly	1–1	1–2	2–3	
2022–23	CAF Champions League	Second round	(Niger) ASN Nigelec	1–0	2–0	3–0	
2022–23	CAF Champions League	Group stage	(Uganda) Vipers SC	5–0	1–1	1st place	
2022–23	CAF Champions League	Group stage	(Tanzania) Simba SC	3–1	3–0	1st place	
2022–23	CAF Champions League	Group stage	(Guinea) Horoya AC	2–0	3–1	1st place	
2022–23	CAF Champions League	Quarter–final	(Egypt) Al Ahly	0–0	0–2	0–2	
2024–25	CAF Champions League	Preliminary round	(Niger) AS GNN	5–0	2–1	7–1	
2024–25	CAF Champions League	Second round	(Ghana) Samartex	2–0	2–2	4–2	
2024–25	CAF Champions League	Group stage	(South Africa) Mamelodi Sundowns	1–0	0–1	3rd place	
2024–25	CAF Champions League	Group stage	(Morocco) AS FAR	0–2	1–1	3rd place	
2024–25	CAF Champions League	Group stage	(Democratic Republic of the Congo) AS Maniema Union	1–0	1–1	3rd place	
2026–27	CAF Confederation Cup	Second round	(Nigeria) El-Kanemi Warriors	2–0	2–2	4–2	

=== CAF Super Cup ===
Year	Competition	Opposition	Score	Attendance	Venue	Ref.
1998	CAF Super Cup	(Tunisia) Étoile du Sahel	2–2, (2–4 p)	60,000	Stade Mohammed V, Casablanca	
2000	CAF Super Cup	(Ivory Coast) Africa Sports	2–0	45,000	Stade Mohammed V, Casablanca	
2019	CAF Super Cup	(Tunisia) Espérance de Tunis	2–1	20,000	Thani bin Jassim Stadium, Al Rayyan	
2021	CAF Super Cup	(Egypt) Al Ahly	1–1, (5–6 p)	20,000	Ahmad bin Ali Stadium, Al Rayyan	

== FIFA competitions ==
=== FIFA Club World Cup ===
Year	Competition	Round	Opposition	Score	Attendance	Venue	Ref.
2000	FIFA Club World Championship	Group stage	(Brazil) Corinthians	0–2	23,000	Estádio do Morumbi, São Paulo	
2000	FIFA Club World Championship	Group stage	(Saudi Arabia) Al Nassr	3–4	3,000	Estádio do Morumbi, São Paulo	
2000	FIFA Club World Championship	Group stage	(Spain) Real Madrid	2–3	18,000	Estádio do Morumbi, São Paulo	
2013	FIFA Club World Cup	Play–off for quarter–final	(New Zealand) Auckland City	2–1	34,875	Stade Adrar, Agadir	
2013	FIFA Club World Cup	Quarter–final	(Mexico) Monterrey	2–1	34,579	Stade Adrar, Agadir	
2013	FIFA Club World Cup	Semi–final	(Brazil) Atlético Mineiro	3–1	35,219	Marrakesh Stadium, Marrakesh	
2013	FIFA Club World Cup	Final	(Germany) Bayern Munich	0–2	35,219	Marrakesh Stadium, Marrakesh	

=== Afro–Asian Club Championship ===
Year	Competition	Round	Opposition	Home	Away	Aggregate	Ref.
1998	Afro–Asian Club Championship	Final	(South Korea) Pohang Steelers	1–0	2–2	3–2	

== UAFA & UNAF competitions ==
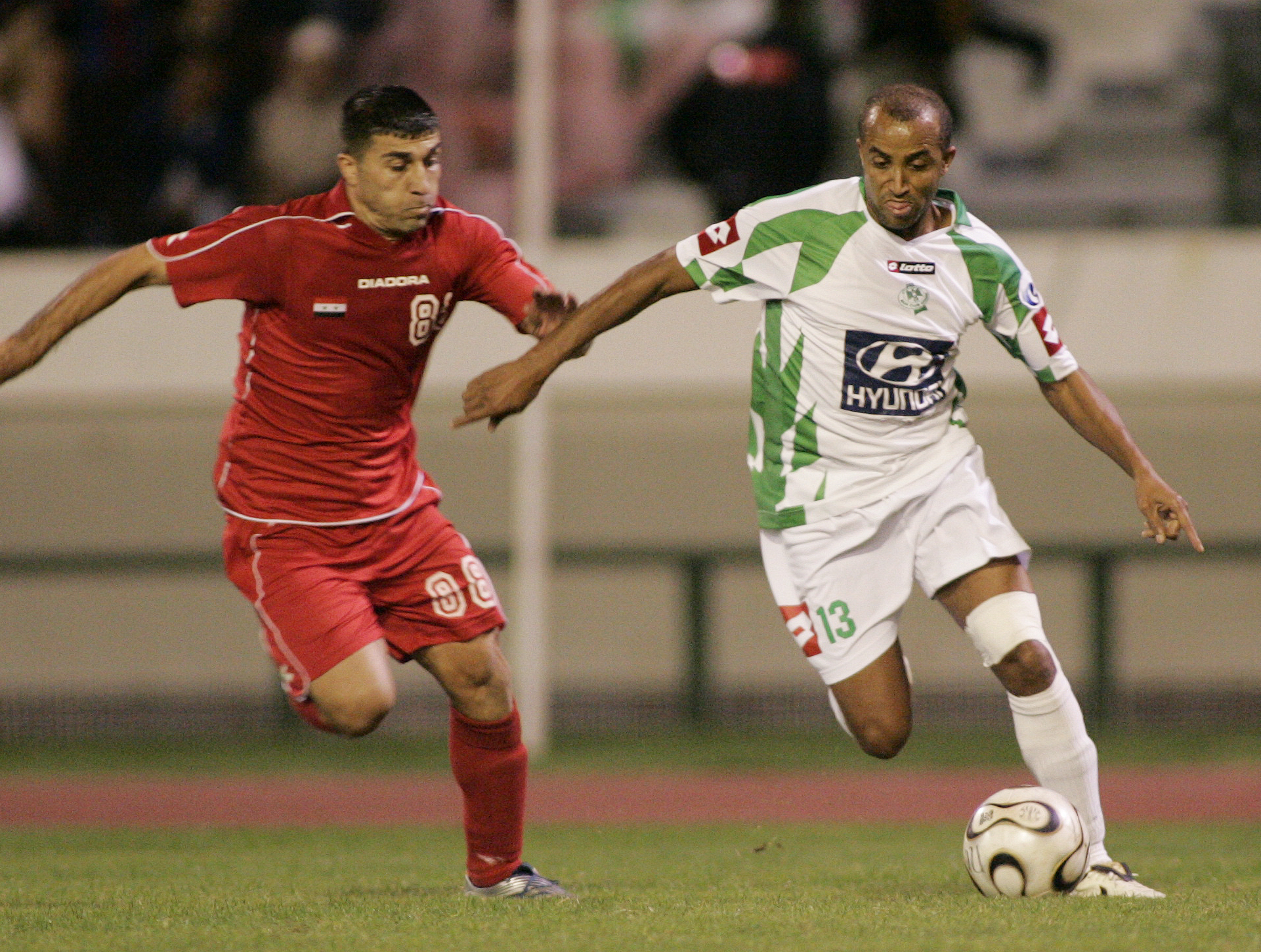
Omar Nejjary against Al–Taliya in the 2008–09 Arab Champions League

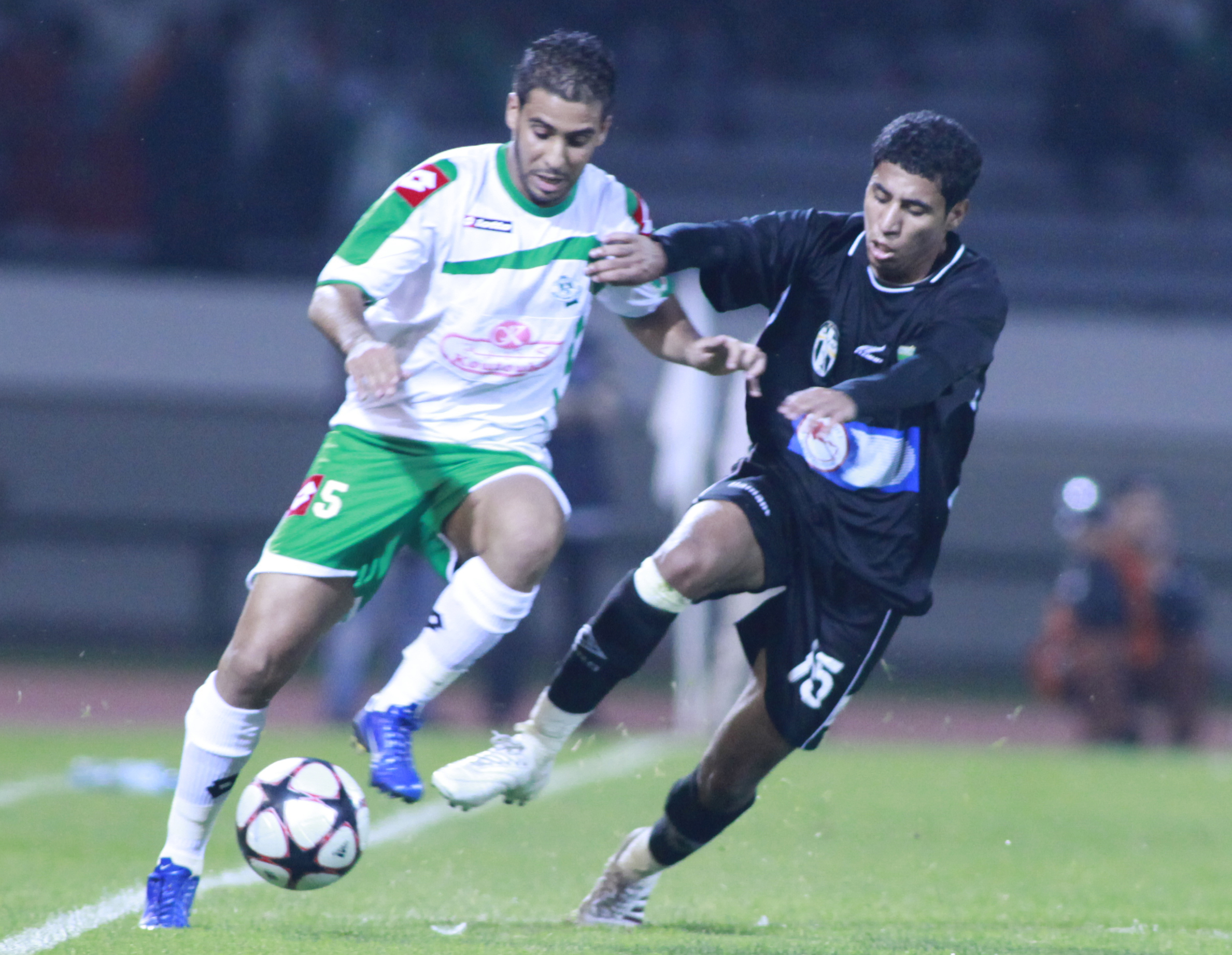
Mohsine Moutouali against ES Sétif in the 2009 North African Cup of Champions

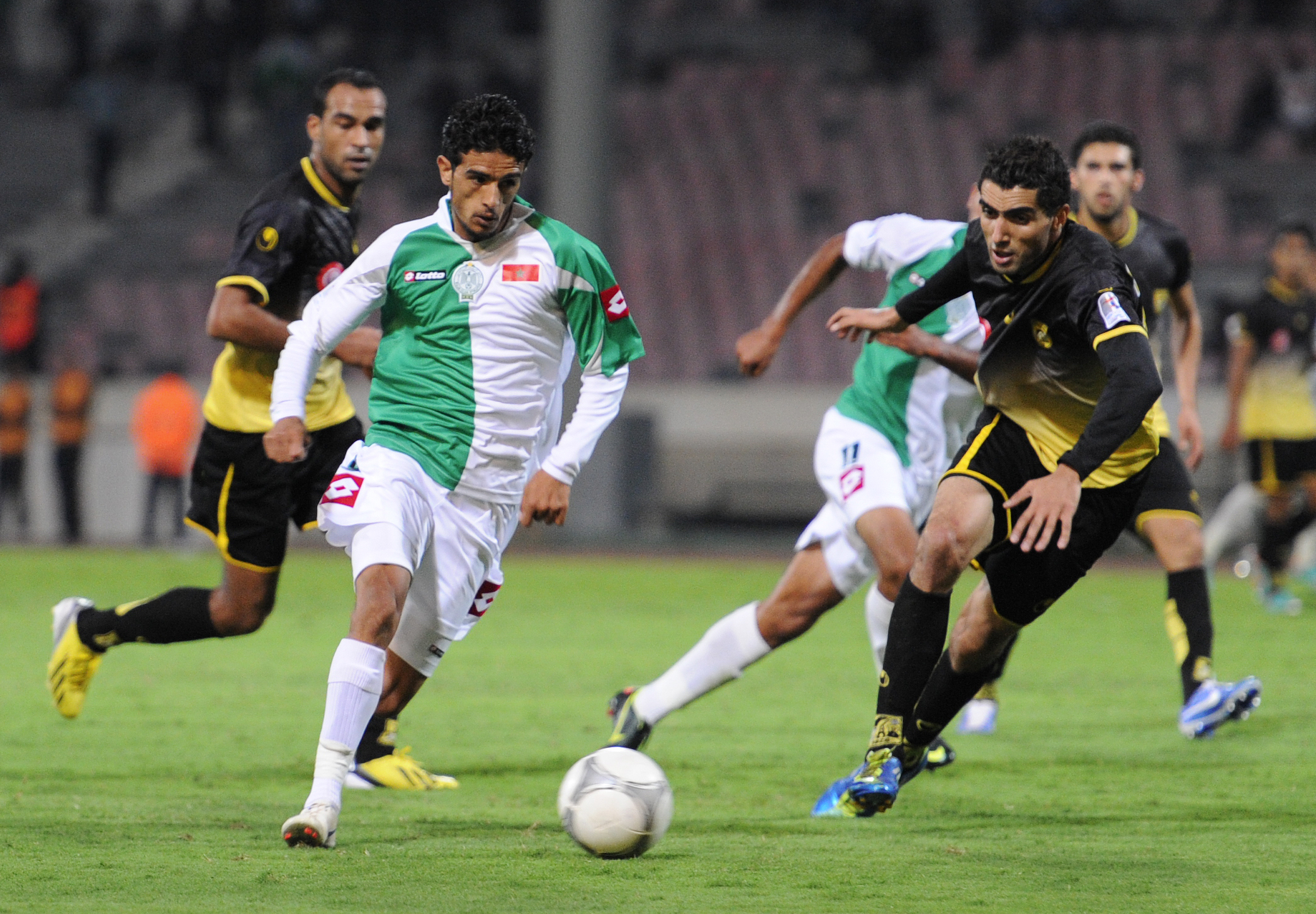
Chamseddine Chtibi against CA Bizertin in the 2012–13 UAFA Club Cup

Season	Competition	Round	Opposition	Home	Away	Aggregate	Ref.
1987	Arab Club Champions Cup	Groupe stage	(Tunisia) Étoile du Sahel	1–4		3rd place	
1987	Arab Club Champions Cup	Groupe stage	(Algeria) JE Tizi Ouzou	0–0		3rd place	
1996	Arab Club Champions Cup	Groupe stage	(Saudi Arabia) Al Hilal Riyadh	1–1		1st place	
1996	Arab Club Champions Cup	Groupe stage	(Jordan) Al Wehdat	4–0		1st place	
1996	Arab Club Champions Cup	Groupe stage	(Sudan) Al Hilal Omdurman	5–0		1st place	
1996	Arab Club Champions Cup	Semi–final	(Palestine) Shabab Rafah	7–0			
1996	Arab Club Champions Cup	Final	(Egypt) Al Ahly	1–3			
1997	Arab Super Cup	Groupe stage	(Morocco) Olympique Khouribga	0–0		4th place	
1997	Arab Super Cup	Groupe stage	(Jordan) Al Faisaly	1–2		4th place	
1997	Arab Super Cup	Groupe stage	(Egypt) Al Ahly	0–2		4th place	
2003	Arab Unified Club Championship	Groupe stage	(Egypt) ENPPI	1–1		2nd place	
2003	Arab Unified Club Championship	Groupe stage	(Jordan) Al Faisaly	1–0		2nd place	
2003	Arab Unified Club Championship	Groupe stage	(Saudi Arabia) Al Ettifaq	0–2		2nd place	
2003	Arab Unified Club Championship	Groupe stage	(Bahrain) Riffa	4–3		2nd place	
2003	Arab Unified Club Championship	Semi–final	Kuwait SC	0–3			
2005–06	Arab Champions League	Round of 32	(Syria) Al–Wahda	1–0	1–1	2–1	
2005–06	Arab Champions League	Round of 16	(Egypt) Zamalek	0–2	3–0	3–2	
2005–06	Arab Champions League	Quarter–final	(Kuwait) Al Qadsia	3–0	0–1	3–1	
2005–06	Arab Champions League	Semi–final	(Sudan) Al Hilal	5–0	3–0 (Note: Al-Hilal were sanctioned with a 3-0 loss after the pitch was invaded and the referee was assaulted by the club's supporters)	8–0	
2005–06	Arab Champions League	Final	(Egypt) ENPPI	1–0	2–1	3–1	
2006–07	Arab Champions League	Round of 32	(Palestine) Markaz Tulkarem	8–0	6–0	14–0	
2006–07	Arab Champions League	Round of 16	(Saudi Arabia) Al Ahli	3–3	1–1	4–4 (a)	
2007–08	Arab Champions League	Round of 32	(Palestine) Shabab Rafah	w/o (Note: Shabab Rafah couldn't obtain licenses from the colonial authorities to go out to the West Bank and from there to Morocco)			
2007–08	Arab Champions League	Round of 16	(Sudan) Al Merrikh	3–1	2–2	5–3	
2007–08	Arab Champions League	Group stage	(Jordan) Al Faisaly	0–0	1–1	3rd place	
2007–08	Arab Champions League	Group stage	(Algeria) ES Sétif	1–0	0–2	3rd place	
2007–08	Arab Champions League	Group stage	(Syria) Al Majd	0–0	1–1	3rd place	
2008–09	Arab Champions League	Round of 32	(Syria) Al–Taliya	4–0	2–2	6–2	
2008–09	Arab Champions League	Round of 16	(Tunisia) CS Sfax	0–1	0–0	0–1	
2009	North African Cup of Champions	Semi–final	(Algeria) ES Sétif	1–1	0–2	1–3	
2012–13	UAFA Cup	Play–off second round	(Tunisia) CA Bizertin	4–0	0–2	4–2	
2012–13	UAFA Cup	Quarter–final	(Iraq) Al–Quwa Al–Jawiya	2–0	1–1	3–1	
2012–13	UAFA Cup	Semi–final	(Kuwait) Al–Arabi	2–2	1–1	3–3 (a)	
2015	UNAF Club Cup	Groupe stage	(Egypt) Ismaily	1–0		Champions	
2015	UNAF Club Cup	Groupe stage	(Tunisia) Club Africain	2–0		Champions	
2015	UNAF Club Cup	Groupe stage	(Libya) Al Hilal Benghazi	0–0		Champions	
2018–19	Arab Club Champions Cup	Round of 32	(Lebanon) Salam Zgharta	1–1	2–1	3–1	
2018–19	Arab Club Champions Cup	Round of 16	(Egypt) Ismaily	0–0	0–0	0–0 (4–2 p)	
2018–19	Arab Club Champions Cup	Quarter–final	(Tunisia) Étoile du Sahel	0–2	1–0	1–2	
2019–20	Arab Club Champions Cup	Round of 32	(Palestine) Hilal Al–Quds	1–0	2–0	3–0	
2019–20	Arab Club Champions Cup	Round of 16	(Morocco) Wydad AC	1–1	4–4	5–5 (a)	
2019–20	Arab Club Champions Cup	Quarter–final	(Algeria) MC Alger	0–1	2–1	2–2 (a)	
2019–20	Arab Club Champions Cup	Semi–final	(Egypt) Ismaily	3–0	0–1	3–1	
2019–20	Arab Club Champions Cup	Final	(Saudi Arabia) Al Ittihad	4–4, (4–3 p) (N)			
2023	Arab Club Champions Cup	Groupe stage	(Algeria) CR Belouizdad	2–1		1st place	
2023	Arab Club Champions Cup	Groupe stage	Kuwait SC	2–0		1st place	
2023	Arab Club Champions Cup	Groupe stage	(United Arab Emirates) Al-Wahda	1–0		1st place	
2023	Arab Club Champions Cup	Quarter–final	(Saudi Arabia) Al Nassr	1–3			

== Finals ==
Year	Competition	Opposing Team	Score	Venue
1989	African Cup of Champions Clubs	(Algeria) MC Oran	1–1, (4–2 p)	Two-legged
1996	Arab Club Champions Cup	(Egypt) Al Ahly	1–3	Cairo International Stadium (Cairo)
1997	Champions League	(Ghana) Obuasi Goldfields	1–1, (5–4 p)	Two-legged
1998	CAF Super Cup	(Tunisia) Étoile du Sahel	2–2, (2–4 p)	Stade Mohammed V (Casablanca)
1998	Afro–Asian Club Championship	(South Korea) Pohang Steelers	3–2 on aggregate	Two-legged
1999	Champions League	(Tunisia) Espérance de Tunis	0–0, (4–3 p)	Two-legged
2000	CAF Super Cup	(Ivory Coast) Africa Sports	2–0	Stade Mohammed V (Casablanca)
2002	Champions League	(Egypt) Zamalek	0–1 on aggregate	Two-legged
2003	CAF Cup	(Cameroon) Cotonsport Garoua	2–0 on aggregate	Two-legged
2006	Arab Champions League	(Egypt) ENPPI	3–1 on aggregate	Two-legged
2013	FIFA Club World Cup	(Germany) Bayern Munich	0–2	Marrakesh Stadium (Marrakesh)
2015	UNAF Club Cup	(Tunisia) Club Africain	2–0	Stade Mohammed V (Casablanca)
2018	Confederation Cup	(Democratic Republic of the Congo) AS Vita Club	4–3 on aggregate	Two-legged
2019	CAF Super Cup	(Tunisia) Espérance de Tunis	2–1	Thani bin Jassim Stadium (Al Rayyan)
2021	Confederation Cup	(Algeria) JS Kabylie	2–1	Stade de l'Amitié (Cotonou)
2021	Arab Club Champions Cup	(Saudi Arabia) Al Ittihad Jeddah	4–4, (4–3 p)	Prince Moulay Abdellah Stadium (Rabat)
2021	CAF Super Cup	(Egypt) Al Ahly	1–1, (5–6 p)	Ahmad bin Ali Stadium (Al Rayyan)

=== Details ===
3 December 1989 African Cup of Champions Clubs 1st leg	Raja CA (Morocco)	1–0	(Algeria) MC Oran	Casablanca, Morocco
17:00 UTC+0	Diagne 50'			Stadium: Stade Mohamed V Attendance: 50,000; Referee: Badara Sène (Senegal)

15 December 1989 African Cup of Champions Clubs 2nd leg	MC Oran (Algeria)	1–0 (2–4 p)	(Morocco) Raja CA	Oran, Algeria
17:00 UTC+0	Sebbah 43' (pen.)			Stadium: Stade du 19 Juin; Attendance: 45,000; Referee: Mohamed Hafez (Egypt)
	Penalties
	Sebbah (penalty scored); Benhalima (penalty missed); Maroc (penalty scored); Bott (penalty missed)		(penalty scored) Diagne; (penalty scored) Khalif; (penalty scored) Kadmiri; (penalty scored) Madih

16 September 1996 Arab Club Champions Cup	Al-Ahly (Egypt)	3–1	(Morocco) Raja CA	Cairo, Egypt
19:00 UTC+0	Tolba 2'; Khashaba 49' (pen.); Walid 89'		27' Bassir	Stadium: Cairo International Stadium; Attendance: 40,000

30 November 1997 Champions League 1st leg	Obuasi Goldfields (Ghana)	1–0	(Morocco) Raja CA	Obuasi, Ghana
16:00 UTC+0	Adjei 79'			Stadium: Len Clay Stadium; Attendance: 20,000; Referee: Sinko Zeli (Ivory Coast)

14 December 1997 Champions League 2nd leg	Raja CA (Morocco)	1–0 (5–4 p)	(Ghana) Obuasi Goldfields	Casablanca, Morocco
16:00 UTC+0	Nazir 78'			Stadium: Stade Mohamed V Attendance: 80,000; Referee: Lim Kee Chong (Mauritius)
	Penalties
	Nejjary (penalty scored); Ereyahi (penalty scored); Sabir (penalty missed); Ogandaga (penalty missed); Jrindou (penalty scored); Zitouni (penalty scored); Fahmi (penalty scored)		Okyere (penalty scored); Owusu (penalty missed); Ansah (penalty scored); Ahinful (penalty missed); Issah (penalty scored); Koné (penalty scored); Duah (penalty missed)

15 March 1998 CAF Super Cup	Raja CA (Morocco)	2–2 (a.e.t.) (2–4 p)	(Tunisia) Étoile du Sahel	Casablanca, Morocco
15:00 UTC+0	Nazir 69'; Londo 82'	Report	Dziri 45'; Ben Younes 52'	Stadium: Stade Mohamed V Attendance: 80,000; Referee: Falla N'Doye (Senegal)
	Penalties
	Khalif (penalty scored); Jrindou (penalty scored); Ziyati (penalty missed); El Haimer (penalty missed)		(penalty scored) Clayton; (penalty scored) Bouazizi; (penalty scored) Ghodhbane; (penalty scored) Mhadhbi

11 April 1999 Afro-Asian Cup 1st leg	Pohang Steelers (South Korea)	2–2	(Morocco) Raja CA	Pohang, South Korea
01:00 UTC+0	Seung 67'; Tae-ha 72'	Report	Moustawdae 41'; Khalif 57'	Stadium: Pohang Steel Yard; Attendance: 20,000

25 April 1999 Afro-Asian Cup 2nd leg	Raja CA (Morocco)	1–0	(South Korea) Pohang Steelers	Casablanca, Morocco
16:00 UTC+0	Aboub 75'			Stadium: Stade Mohamed V Attendance: 60,000; Referee: Falla N'Doye (Senegal)

27 November 1999 Champions League 1st leg	Raja CA (Morocco)	0–0	(Tunisia) ES Tunis	Casablanca, Morocco
16:00 UTC+0				Stadium: Stade Père Jégo; Attendance: 10,000; Referee: Mathabella Petros (South Africa)

12 December 1999 Champions League 2nd leg	ES Tunis (Tunisia)	0–0 (3–4 p)	(Morocco) Raja CA	Tunis, Tunisia
16:00 UTC+0				Stadium: Stade El Menzah; Attendance: 50,000; Referee: Manuel Monteiro Duarte (Cape Verde)
	Penalties
	Badra (penalty scored); Kanzari (penalty missed); Gabsi (penalty scored); Chihi (penalty scored); El Ouaer (penalty missed)		(penalty scored) Khoubache; (penalty scored) El Karkouri; (penalty missed) Safri; (penalty scored) Aboub; (penalty scored) El Haimer

5 March 2000 CAF Super Cup	Raja CA (Morocco)	2–0	(Ivory Coast) Africa Sports	Casablanca, Morocco
16:00 UTC+0	El Moubarki 52'; Armoumen 86'	Report		Stadium: Stade Mohamed V Attendance: 50,000; Referee: Falla N'Doye (Senegal)

30 November 2002 Champions League 1st leg	Raja CA (Morocco)	0–0	(Egypt) Zamalek	Casablanca, Morocco
19:00 UTC+0				Stadium: Stade Mohamed V Attendance: 70,000; Referee: Falla N'Doye (Senegal)

13 December 2002 Champions League 2nd leg	Zamalek (Egypt)	1–0	(Morocco) Raja CA	Cairo, Egypt
17:00 UTC+0	Abdel Hamid 45+4'			Stadium: Cairo International Stadium, Cairo; Attendance: 67,310; Referee: Abdel Hakim Shelmani (Libya)

9 November 2003 CAF Cup 1st leg	Raja CA (Morocco)	2–0	(Cameroon) Cotonsport Garoua	Casablanca, Morocco
19:00 UTC+0	Bidoudane 11'; Diallo 72'			Stadium: Stade Mohamed V Attendance: 70,000; Referee: Falla N'Doye (Senegal)

23 November 2003 CAF Cup 2nd leg	Cotonsport Garoua (Cameroon)	0–0	(Morocco) Raja CA	Garoua, Cameroon
16:00 UTC+0				Stadium: Roumdé Adjia Stadium; Attendance: 25,000; Referee: Reda El Beltagi (Egypt)

18 April 2006 Arab Champions League 1st leg	ENPPI (Egypt)	1–2	(Morocco) Raja CA	Cairo, Egypt
16:00 UTC+0	Abdel-Aaty 54' (pen.)	Report	Alloudi 11'; Soulaimani 68'	Stadium: Osman Ahmed Osman Stadium; Attendance: 20,000; Referee: Salim Mahmoud (Jordan)

6 May 2006 Arab Champions League 1st leg	Raja CA (Morocco)	1–0	(Egypt) ENPPI	Casablanca, Morocco
19:00 UTC+0	Alloudi 67'	Report		Stadium: Stade Mohamed V Attendance: 80,000; Referee: Khalil Al Ghamdi (Saudi Arabia)

21 December 2013 FIFA Club World Cup	Bayern Munich (Germany)	2–0	(Morocco) Raja CA	Marrakesh, Morocco
19:30 UTC±0	Dante 7'; Thiago 22'	Report		Stadium: Marrakesh Stadium; Attendance: 37,774; Referee: Sandro Ricci (Brazil)

16 August 2015 UNAF Club Cup	Raja CA (Morocco)	2–0	(Tunisia) Club Africain	Casablanca, Morocco
21:00 UTC+0	Bouldini 32'; Iajour 88'	Report		Stadium: Stade Mohamed V Attendance: 30,000; Referee: Ibrahim Noureddin (Egypt)

25 November 2018 Confederation Cup 1st leg	Raja CA (Morocco)	3–0	(Democratic Republic of the Congo) AS Vita Club	Casablanca, Morocco
20:00 UTC+1	Rahimi 47', 61'; Benhalib 66' (pen.)	Report		Stadium: Stade Mohamed V Attendance: 45,000; Referee: Maguette N'Diaye (Senegal)

2 December 2018 Confederation Cup 2nd leg	AS Vita Club (Democratic Republic of the Congo)	3–1	(Morocco) Raja CA	Kinshasa, RD Congo
20:00 UTC+1	Mundele 45+4'; Batezadio 71'; Ngoma 74'		Hafidi 21'	Stadium: Stade des Martyrs; Attendance: 75,000; Referee: Victor Gomes (South Africa)

29 March 2019 CAF Super Cup	Espérance de Tunis (Tunisia)	1–2	(Morocco) Raja CA	Doha, Qatar
19:00 UTC+3	Belaïli 57'	Report	Hafidi 22'; Banoun 64'	Stadium: Thani bin Jassim Stadium; Attendance: 5,000; Referee: Bamlak Tessema Weyesa (Ethiopia)

10 July 2021 Confederation Cup	Raja CA (Morocco)	2–1	(Algeria) JS Kabylie	Cotonou, Bénin
20:00 UTC+1	Rahimi 5'; Malango 14'	Report	Zaka 46'	Stadium: Stade de l'Amitié; Attendance: 45,000; Referee: Victor Gomes (South Africa)

21 August 2021 Arab Club Champions Cup	Al-Ittihad Jeddah (Saudi Arabia)	4–4 (3–4 p)	(Morocco) Raja CA	Rabat, Morocco
21:00 UTC+1	Henrique 4'; Romarinho 28' (pen.), 53', 64' (pen.)	Report	Haddad 5'; Benhalib 13'; El Wardi 37'; Rahimi 50'	Stadium: Prince Moulay Abdellah Stadium; Attendance: 0 Referee: Mahmoud El Banna (Egypt)
	Penalties
	Henrique (penalty missed); Romarinho (penalty scored); Coronado (penalty scored); Al-Muwallad (penalty missed); Al-Malki (penalty scored)		(penalty scored) Rahimi; (penalty scored) Zrida; (penalty missed) Madkour; (penalty scored) Hafidi; (penalty scored) Arjoune

22 December 2021 CAF Super Cup	Al Ahly (Egypt)	1–1 (6–5 p)	(Morocco) Raja CA	Al Rayyan, Qatar
18:00 UTC+1	Taher 90'	Report	Ibrahim 13' (o.g.)	Stadium: Ahmed bin Ali Stadium; Attendance: 20,000; Referee: Jean-Jacques Ndala Ngambo (DR Congo)
	Penalties
	Maâloul (penalty scored); Benoun (penalty scored); Tau (penalty scored); Abdel Kader (penalty scored); Taher (penalty scored); Tawfik (penalty scored)		(penalty scored) Zrida; (penalty scored) El Wardi; (penalty scored) Hadhoudi; (penalty scored) Benhalib; (penalty scored) Moutouali; (penalty missed) Madkour

== Statistics ==
As of match played 19 January 2025

=== By season ===
- Pld = Played
- W = Games won
- D = Games drawn
- L = Games lost
- F = Goals for
- A = Goals against
- GS = Group stage
- PR = Preliminary round
- R1 = First round
- R2 = Second round
- PO = Play-off round
- R16 = Round of 16
- QF = Quarter-final
- SF = Semi-final

Key to colours and symbols:

W	Winners
RU	Runners-up

Raja CA record in African football by season
Season	Competition	Pld	W	D	L	GF	GA	GD	Round
1983	African Cup Winners' Cup	2	0	1	1	0	1	-1	R1
1989	African Cup of Champions Clubs	10	4	3	3	10	6	+4	W
1990	African Cup of Champions Clubs	2	1	0	1	3	2	+1	R2
1997	CAF Champions League	12	7	3	2	20	9	+11	W
1998	CAF Super Cup	1	0	1	0	2	2	+0	RU
1998	CAF Champions League	10	4	3	3	21	9	+12	GS
1998	Afro–Asian Club Championship	2	1	1	0	3	2	+1	W
1999	CAF Champions League	12	5	4	3	11	5	+6	W
2000	FIFA Club World Championship	3	0	0	3	5	9	-4	GS
2000	CAF Super Cup	1	1	0	0	2	0	+2	W
2000	CAF Champions League	4	2	1	1	7	5	+2	R2
2001	CAF Champions League	4	2	0	2	5	6	-1	R2
2002	CAF Champions League	14	8	2	4	24	16	+8	RU
2003	CAF Cup	10	6	2	2	26	10	+16	W
2004	CAF Champions League	2	1	0	1	2	2	+0	R1
2005	CAF Champions League	12	4	4	4	11	9	+2	SF
2006	CAF Champions League	5	3	0	2	11	5	+6	R2
2006	CAF Confederation Cup	2	0	1	1	0	2	-2	PO
2010	CAF Champions League	4	1	2	1	5	4	+1	R2
2011	CAF Champions League	10	2	4	4	14	9	+5	GS
2012	CAF Champions League	2	1	0	1	3	5	-2	R1
2013	FIFA Club World Cup	4	3	0	1	7	5	+2	RU
2014	CAF Champions League	4	3	0	1	9	3	+6	R1
2015	CAF Champions League	6	3	3	0	13	6	+7	R2
2015	CAF Confederation Cup	2	1	0	1	2	3	-1	PO
2018	CAF Confederation Cup	16	11	3	2	34	13	+21	W
2019	CAF Super Cup	1	1	0	0	2	1	-1	W
2018–19	CAF Confederation Cup	10	3	5	2	14	8	+6	GS
2019–20	CAF Champions League	14	6	4	4	20	14	+6	SF
2020–21	CAF Champions League	2	0	2	0	0	0	+0	R1
2020–21	CAF Confederation Cup	13	9	3	1	21	3	+18	W
2021	CAF Super Cup	1	0	1	0	1	1	+0	RU
2021–22	CAF Champions League	10	7	1	2	13	5	+8	QF
2022–23	CAF Champions League	10	7	2	1	20	7	+13	QF
2024–25	CAF Champions League	10	5	3	2	15	8	+7	GS
Total		227	112	59	56	356	195	+161	

=== By competition ===
==== CAF Competitions ====
Raja CA record in CAF competitions
Competition	Seasons	Played	Won	Drawn	Lost	Goals For	Goals Against	Last season played
CAF Champions League	21	159	76	41	42	237	132	2024–25
CAF Confederation Cup	5	43	24	12	7	71	29	2020–21
CAF Super Cup	4	4	2	2	0	7	4	2021
CAF Cup (defunct)	1	10	6	2	2	26	10	2003
African Cup Winners' Cup (defunct)	1	2	0	1	1	0	1	1983
Total	32	218	108	58	52	341	176	

==== Non–CAF competitions ====
Raja CA record in Non–CAF competitions
Competition	Seasons	Played	Won	Drawn	Lost	Goals For	Goals Against	Last season played
FIFA Club World Cup	2	7	3	0	4	12	14	2013
Arab Club Champions Cup	11	63	28	22	13	113	63	2023
Afro-Asian Club Championship (defunct)	1	2	1	1	0	3	2	1998
UNAF Club Cup (defunct)	1	3	2	1	0	3	0	2015
North African Cup of Champions (defunct)	1	2	0	1	1	1	3	2009
Arab Super Cup (defunct)	1	3	0	1	2	1	4	1997
Total	17	80	34	26	20	133	86	

== African goals ==
As of match played 19 January 2025

=== Top goalscorers ===
Bold indicates player is still active at club level.

Rank	Player	Nationality	Years	CCL	~~CAC~~CCC	SC	AACC	FCWC	Total
1	Mouhcine Iajour	Morocco	2004–2007; 2012–2014; 2017–2019	9	10	–	–	2	21
2	Mahmoud Benhalib	Morocco	2016–2021	2	15	–	–	–	17
3	Hicham Aboucherouane	Morocco	2001–2007; 2010–2011	9	6	–	–	–	15
3	Mustapha Moustawdae	Morocco	1988–2000	13	–	–	1	1	15
5	Soufiane Rahimi	Morocco	2018–2021	3	10	–	–	–	13
6	Mohsine Moutouali	Morocco	2007–2014; 2019–2022	9	–	–	–	1	10
7	Badr Benoun	Morocco	2014–2020	5	3	1	–	–	9
7	Mustapha Bidoudane	Morocco	2002–2006	5	4	–	–	–	9
7	Ben Malango	RD Congo	2019–2021	3	6	–	–	–	9
10	Réda Ryahi	Morocco	1997–2000	8	–	–	–	–	8
10	Bouchaib El Moubarki	Morocco	1999–2001; 2010–2012	6	–	1	–	1	8
12	Abdelilah Hafidi	Morocco	2011–2022; 2023	2	3	1	–	1	7

=== Super Hat–tricks ===
Date	Player	Match	Score	Time of goals
20 September 1998	(Morocco) Réda Ryahi	Raja CA – Young Africans	6–0	72', 75', 82', 90'
3 April 1999	(Morocco) Mustapha Moustawdae	Raja CA – ASEC Ndiambour	4–0	13', 46', 64', 74'
7 February 2014	(Morocco) Mouhcine Iajour	Raja CA – Diamond Stars	6–0	8', 46', 66', 82'

=== Hat–tricks ===
Date	Player	Match	Score	Time of goals
1 April 2006	(Morocco) Mustapha Bidoudane	Raja CA – Inter Star	7–0	12', 38', 48'
28 January 2011	(Morocco) Hassan Tair	Raja CA – Tourbillon FC	10–1	11', 29', 51'

=== Braces ===
Date	Player	Match	Score	Competition
22 October 1989	(Morocco) Bouazza Ouldmou	Raja CA – Tonnerre Yaoundé	2–0	Champions League
5 November 1989	(Senegal) Salif Diagne	Tonnerre Yaoundé – Raja CA	2–2	Champions League
7 March 1997	(Gabon) Jonas Ogandaga	Raja CA – SONACOS	3–1	Champions League
3 May 1997	(Morocco) Mustapha Moustawdae	Raja CA – Mbilinga FC	3–0	Champions League
8 November 1997	(Morocco) Abdelkarim Nazir	Orlando Pirates – Raja CA	1–2	Champions League
3 April 1998	(Morocco) Mustapha Moustawdae	Raja CA – Mogas 90	6–0	Champions League
10 October 1998	(Morocco) Réda Ryahi	Young Africans – Raja CA	3–3	Champions League
23 March 2002	(Burkina Faso) Mohamed Ali Diallo	Wallidan FC – Raja CA	1–3	Champions League
1 September 2002	(Morocco) Hicham Aboucherouane	ASC Jeanne d'Arc – Raja CA	1–2	Champions League
18 October 2002	(Morocco) Hicham Aboucherouane	Al Ahly SC – Raja CA	3–3	Champions League
16 November 2002	(Cameroon) François Endene	Raja CA – ASEC Mimosas	4–0	Champions League
13 April 2003	(Morocco) Mustapha Bidoudane	Étoile Filante – Raja CA	2–3	CAF Cup
26 April 2003	(Morocco) Hicham Aboucherouane	Raja CA - Étoile Filante	4–0	CAF Cup
20 May 2003	(Morocco) Hicham Aboucherouane	Raja CA - Black Rhinos	5–1	CAF Cup
4 October 2003	(Burkina Faso) Yssouf Koné	Raja CA - Enugu Rangers	4–1	CAF Cup

Date	Player	Match	Score	Competition
5 April 2015	(Nigeria) Christian Osaguona	Raja CA – Kaizer Chiefs	2–0	Champions League
17 March 2018	(Morocco) Mouhcine Iajour	FC Nouadhibou	2–4	Confederation Cup
16 May 2018	(Morocco) Mahmoud Benhalib	Aduana Stars - Raja CA	3–3	Confederation Cup
29 July 2018	(Morocco) Mahmoud Benhalib	Raja CA – ASEC Mimosas	4–0	Confederation Cup
29 July 2018	(Morocco) Zakaria Hadraf	Raja CA – ASEC Mimosas	4–0	Confederation Cup
29 August 2018	(Morocco) Mahmoud Benhalib	Raja CA - Aduana Stars	6–0	Confederation Cup
29 August 2018	(Morocco) Mouhcine Iajour	Raja CA - Aduana Stars	6–0	Confederation Cup
25 November 2018	(Morocco) Soufiane Rahimi	Raja CA - AS Vita Club	3–0	Confederation Cup
24 February 2019	(Morocco) Mouhcine Iajour	Raja CA - RS Berkane	2–4	Confederation Cup
10 August 2019	(Morocco) Badr Benoun	Brikama United – Raja CA	3–3	Champions League
24 August 2019	(Morocco) Ayoub Nanah	Raja CA – Brikama United	4–0	Champions League
7 March 2021	(Democratic Republic of the Congo) Ben Malango	Raja CA - Orlando Pirates	4–0	Confederation Cup
7 March 2023	(Morocco) Walid Sabbar	Horoya AC - Raja CA	1–3	Champions League
31 March 2023	(Morocco) Hamza Khabba	Raja CA - Simba SC	3–0	Champions League
