= 1997 CAF Champions League final =

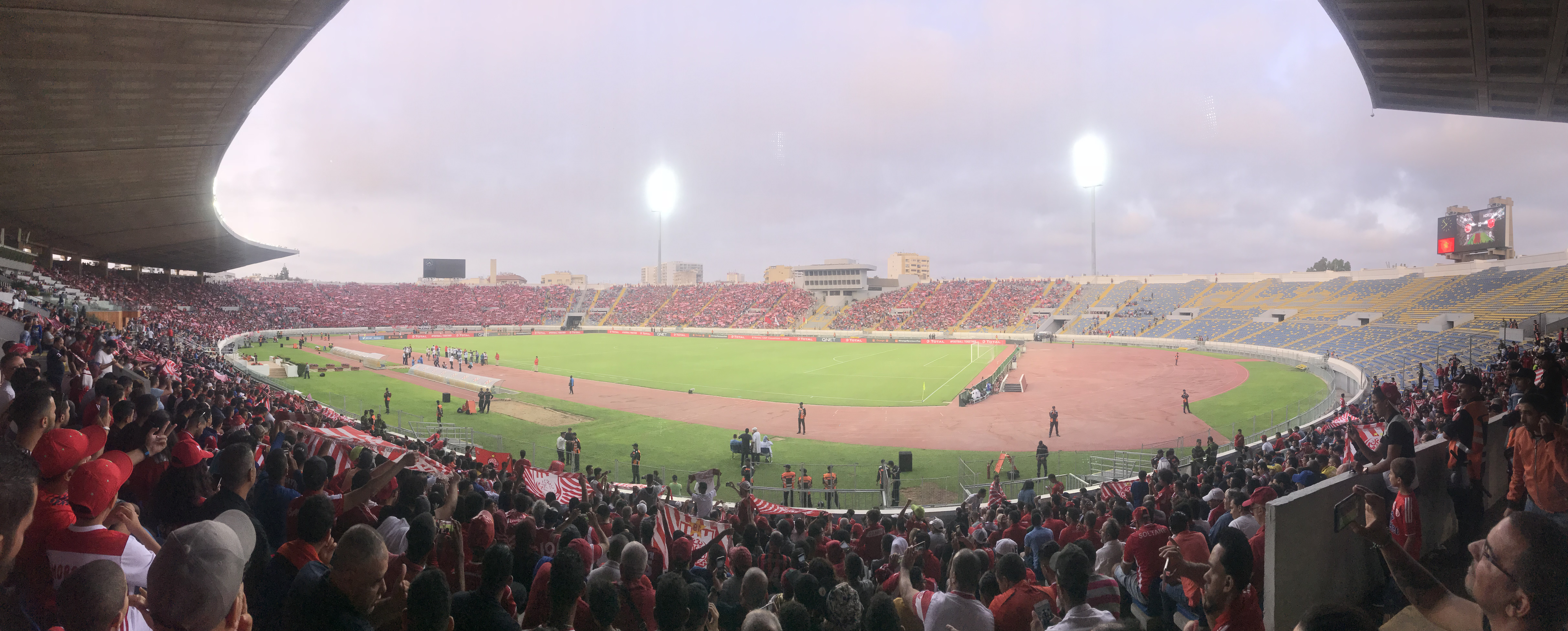
- Mohamed V Stadium hosted the podium where Raja CA lifted the trophy
- Event: 1997 CAF Champions League
Obuasi Goldfields	Raja CA
(Ghana)	(Morocco)
1	1
- pen (4 – 5)

First leg
Obuasi Goldfields	Raja CA
1	0
- Date: 30 November 1997
- Venue: Baba Yara Stadium, Obuasi
- Referee: Sinko Zeli (Ivory Coast)

Second leg
Raja CA	Obuasi Goldfields
1	0
- Raja CA won 5–4 on penalties
- Date: 14 December 1997
- Venue: Stade Mohamed V, Casablanca
- Referee: Lim Kee Chong (Mauritius)

The 1997 CAF Champions League final is the final of the 1997 CAF Champions League, the 33rd edition of Africa's premier club football tournament organized by the Confederation of African Football (CAF), and the 1st edition under the current CAF Champions League format.

The final is contested in two-legged home-and-away format between Obuasi Goldfields SC of Ghana and Raja CA Casablanca of Morocco. The first leg was hosted by Obuasi Goldfields SC at the Baba Yara Stadium in Obuasi on 30 November 1997, while the second leg was hosted by Raja CA Casablanca at the Stade Mohamed V in Casablanca on 14 December 1997. Raja CA Casablanca won on penalties shootout and it earns the right to play in the 1998 CAF Super Cup against the winner of the 1997 African Cup Winners' Cup.

== Qualified teams ==
In the following table, finals until 1996 were in the African Cup of Champions Club era, since 1997 were in the CAF Champions League era.

Team	Region	Previous finals appearances (bold indicates winners)
(Ghana) Obuasi Goldfields SC	WAFU (West Africa)	none
(Morocco) Raja CA	UNAF (North Africa)	**1989**

== Venues ==
=== Len Clay Stadium ===
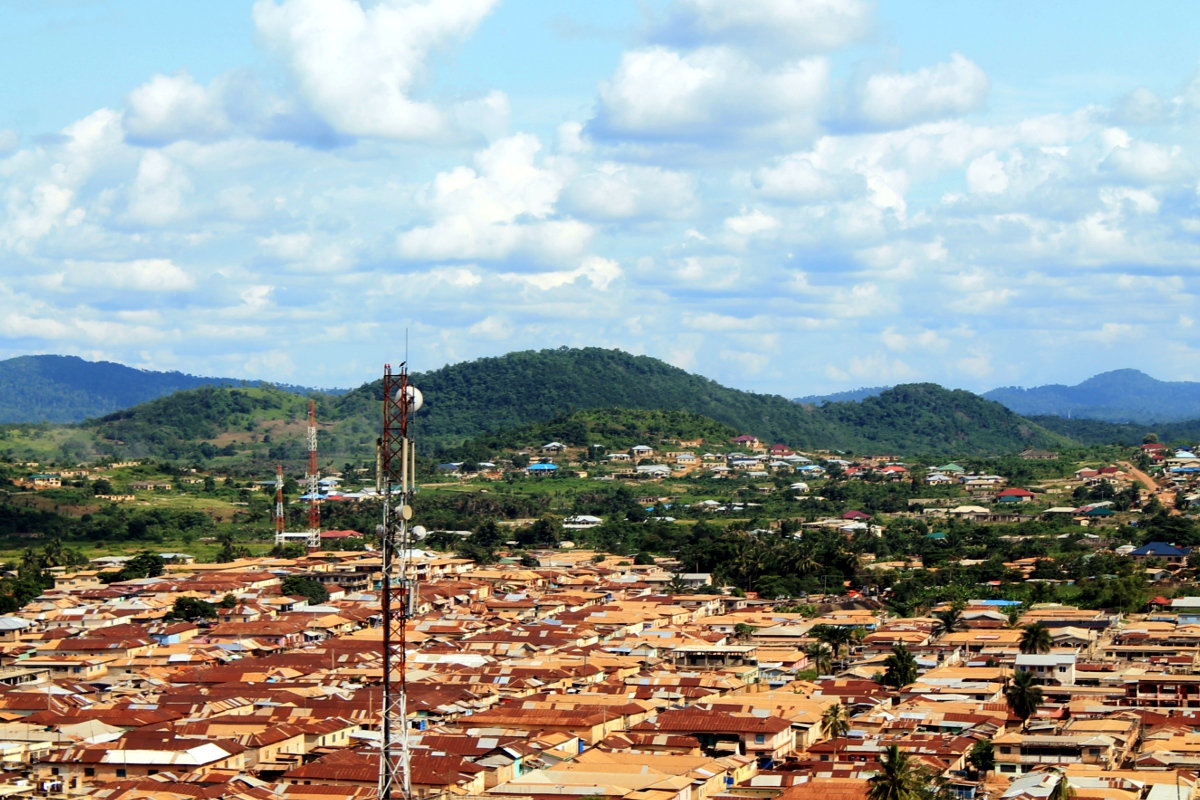
Obuasi, Ghana hosted the first leg.

Len Clay Stadium is a multi-use stadium in Obuasi, Ghana. It was opened on 10 May 1990 by the former president of Ghana, Jerry Rawlings. It is home to Ashanti Gold Sporting Club. It has capacity for 20,000 people. The stadium is dedicated to Len Clay, a former Group Engineering and Projects Manager of Ashanti Goldfield Company and supporter of the team.

The stadium was Built under the direct project supervision Of Engineer and Builder J.A.W Cole, who also built the Enyinam Housing Project and Enyinam lodge amongst others and different projects under S.C.C across Ghana.

=== Mohamed V Stadium ===
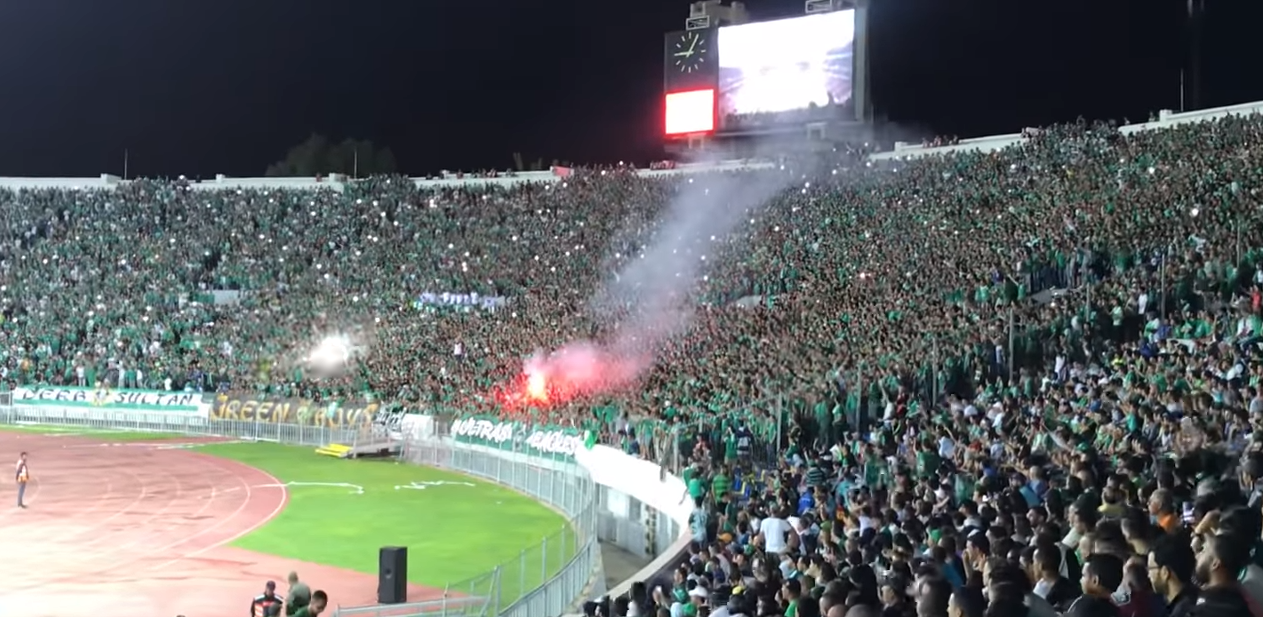
Mohamed V Stadium in Casablanca, Morocco hosted the second leg.

Mohammed V Stadium is part of a big athletic complex situated in the heart of the city of Casablanca, Morocco, in the western part of the Maarif neighborhood. It was inaugurated March 6, 1955, and currently has a capacity of 67,000.

Often hosting the games of the Morocco national football team, the Mohammed V Stadium is equally known as the home of Wydad AC and Raja CA. It is named after King Mohammed V of Morocco.

Mohammed V Stadium is located right in the centre of the city of Casablanca, the international airport of Casablanca is 25 kilometres from the stadium, and the Casa-Voyageurs rail station is 5 kilometres from the stadium. The stadium has a parking lot with a capacity of 1,000 cars.

It currently has a semi-artificial lawn of a high standard.

== Road to final ==
(Morocco) Raja CA				Round	(Ghana) Obuasi Goldfields			
Opponent	Agg.	1st leg	2nd leg	Qualifying rounds	Opponent	Agg.	1st leg	2nd leg
(Senegal) SONACOS	5–1	3–1 (H)	2–0 (A)	First round	(Liberia) Junior Professionals	4–2	3–0 (H)	1–2 (A)
(Gabon) Mbilinga FC	4–1	3–0 (H)	1–1 (A)	Second round	(Sudan) Al-Hilal	3–2	1–2 (A)	2–0 (H)
Opponent	Result			Group stage	Opponent	Result		
(Algeria) USM Alger	2–2 (A)			Matchday 1	(Tunisia) Club Africain	0–0 (A)		
(Angola) Primeiro de Agosto	1–1 (A)			Matchday 2	(Mozambique) Ferroviário Maputo	1–2 (A)		
(South Africa) Orlando Pirates	1–0 (H)			Matchday 3	(Egypt) Zamalek	3–1 (H)		
(Algeria) USM Alger	0–2 (H)			Matchday 4	(Tunisia) Club Africain	2–0 (H)		
(Angola) Primeiro de Agosto	4–0 (H)			Matchday 5	(Mozambique) Ferroviário Maputo	4–0 (H)		
(South Africa) Orlando Pirates	1–2 (A)			Matchday 6	(Egypt) Zamalek	0–2 (A)		
Group A Winner: Pos / Team / Pld / W / D / L / GF / GA / GD / Pts / Qualification; 1 / (Morocco) Raja Casablanca / 6 / 3 / 2 / 1 / 10 / 6 / +4 / **11** / Final; 2 / (Algeria) USM Alger / 6 / 3 / 2 / 1 / 9 / 6 / +3 / **11**; 3 / (Angola) Primeiro de Agosto / 6 / 3 / 1 / 2 / 7 / 9 / −2 / **10**; 4 / (South Africa) Orlando Pirates / 6 / 0 / 1 / 5 / 5 / 10 / −5 / **1**; Source: rsssf.com Rules for classification: Group stage tiebreakers				Final standings	Group B Winner: Pos / Team / Pld / W / D / L / GF / GA / GD / Pts / Qualification; 1 / (Ghana) Obuasi Goldfields / 6 / 3 / 1 / 2 / 10 / 5 / +5 / **10** / Final; 2 / (Egypt) Zamalek / 6 / 3 / 0 / 3 / 7 / 8 / −1 / **9**; 3 / (Tunisia) Club Africain / 6 / 2 / 2 / 2 / 3 / 4 / −1 / **8**; 4 / (Mozambique) Ferroviário Maputo / 6 / 2 / 1 / 3 / 5 / 8 / −3 / **7**; Source: rsssf.com Rules for classification: Group stage tiebreakers			

== Format ==
The final was decided over two legs, with aggregate goals used to determine the winner. If the sides were level on aggregate after the second leg, the away goals rule would have been applied, and if still level, the tie would have proceeded directly to a penalty shootout (no extra time is played).

== Matches ==
=== First leg ===
30 November 1997
16:00

Obuasi Goldfields (Ghana)	1–0	(Morocco) Raja CA
Adjei 79'

Len Clay Stadium, Obuasi
Attendance: 20,000
Referee: Sinko Zeli (Ivory Coast)

=== Second leg ===
14 December 1997
16:00 }

Raja CA (Morocco)	1–0	(Ghana) Obuasi Goldfields
Nazir 78'
Penalties
Nejjary (penalty scored); Ereyahi (penalty scored); Sabir (penalty missed); Ogandaga (penalty missed); Jrindou (penalty scored); Zitouni (penalty scored); Fahmi (penalty scored)	5–4	Okyere (penalty scored); Owusu (penalty missed); Ansah (penalty scored); Ahinful (penalty missed); Issah (penalty scored); Koné (penalty scored); Duah (penalty missed)

Stade Mohamed V, Casablanca
Attendance: 80,000
Referee: Lim Kee Chong (Mauritius)
