= 1997 CAF Champions League =

33rd edition of the CAF Champions League

Tournament details
- Dates: 1 February – 14 December 1997
- Teams: 40 (from 40 associations)

Final positions
- Champions: (Morocco) Raja Casablanca (2nd title)
- Runners-up: (Ghana) Obuasi Goldfields

Tournament statistics
- Matches played: 86
- Goals scored: 128 (1.49 per match)

The 1997 CAF Champions League was the 33rd season of Africa's premier club football tournament organized by CAF, and the inaugural season under the revamped CAF Champions League title and format. Raja Casablanca of Morocco defeated Obuasi Goldfields of Ghana on penalties in the final to win their second title.

== Qualifying rounds ==
=== Preliminary round ===
Team 1	Agg.	Team 2	1st leg	2nd leg
AS CotonTchad (Chad)	w/o^{1}	(Central African Republic) AS Tempête Mocaf	–	–
Mogas 90 FC (Benin)	1–2	(Cape Verde) CD Travadores	1–0	0–2
Muni Sport (Republic of the Congo)	5–1	(Equatorial Guinea) Café Sportif	4–1	1–0
Junior Professionals (Liberia)	2–1	(Burkina Faso) RC Bobo	2–0	0–1
St.-Michel United (Seychelles)	1–5	(Madagascar) FC BFV	1–2	0–3
Notwane FC (Botswana)	w/o^{2}	(Namibia) Blue Waters FC	–	–
Limbe Leaf Wanderers (Malawi)	2–5	(Lesotho) Roma Rovers	1–0	1–5
Young Africans (Tanzania)	0–1	(Uganda) Express Red Eagles FC	0–0	0–1

^{1} AS Tempête Mocaf were disqualified for not paying the entry fee.
^{2} Blue Waters FC withdrew.

=== First round ===
Team 1	Agg.	Team 2	1st leg	2nd leg
USM Alger (Algeria)	9–2	(Cape Verde) CD Travadores	6–1	3–1
Udoji United (Nigeria)	4–2	(Guinea) AS Kaloum Star	3–1	1–1
Unisport FC (Cameroon)	2–2 (5-4 p)	(Republic of the Congo) Muni Sport	2–0	0–2
Ferroviário (Mozambique)	5–0	(Madagascar) FC BFV	4–0	1–0
Raja Casablanca (Morocco)	5–1	(Senegal) SONACOS	3–1	2–0
Mbilinga FC (Gabon)	6–4	(Democratic Republic of the Congo) DC Motema Pembe	3–0	3–4
Africa Sports (Ivory Coast)	4–2	(Chad) AS CotonTchad	3–0	1–2
Primeiro de Agosto (Angola)	3–2	(Botswana) Notwane FC	1–1	2–1
Zamalek (Egypt)	3–1	(Ethiopia) Saint George	2–0	1–1
Mufulira Wanderers (Zambia)	5–1	(Rwanda) APR FC	4–1	1–0
Club Africain (Tunisia)	4–3	(Mali) Djoliba AC	3–2	1–1
Sunrise Flacq United (Mauritius)	1–3	(Réunion) JS Saint-Pierroise	1–0	0–3
Kenya Breweries	0–0 (4-5 p)	(Sudan) Al-Hilal	0–0	0–0
Obuasi Goldfields (Ghana)	4–2	(Liberia) Junior Professionals	3–0	1–2
CAPS United (Zimbabwe)	7–6	(Uganda) Express Red Eagles	5–2	2–4
Orlando Pirates (South Africa)	1–0	(Lesotho) Roma Rovers	1–0	0–0

=== Second round ===
Team 1	Agg.	Team 2	1st leg	2nd leg
USM Alger (Algeria)	3–2	(Nigeria) Udoji United	3–0	0–2
Unisport FC (Cameroon)	2–4	(Mozambique) Ferroviário	1–0	1–4
Raja Casablanca (Morocco)	4–1	(Gabon) Mbilinga FC	3–0	1–1
Africa Sports (Ivory Coast)	1–6	(Angola) Primeiro de Agosto	1–1	0–5
Zamalek (Egypt)	6–2	(Zambia) Mufulira Wanderers	5–2	1–0
Club Africain (Tunisia)	11–1	(Réunion) JS Saint-Pierroise	6–1	5–0
Al-Hilal (Sudan)	2–3	(Ghana) Obuasi Goldfields	2–1	0–2
CAPS United (Zimbabwe)	1–3	(South Africa) Orlando Pirates	1–2	0–1

== Group stage ==
Key to colours in group tables
Group winners advance to the Knockout stage

=== Group A ===
Pos	Team	Pld	W	D	L	GF	GA	GD	Pts	Qualification	RCA	USM	PRI	ORL
1	(Morocco) Raja Casablanca	6	3	2	1	10	6	+4	11	Final	—	0–2	4–0	1–0
2	(Algeria) USM Alger	6	3	2	1	9	6	+3	11		2–2	—	1–0	2–1
3	(Angola) Primeiro de Agosto	6	3	1	2	7	9	−2	10		1–1	2–1	—	2–1
4	(South Africa) Orlando Pirates	6	0	1	5	5	10	−5	1		1–2	1–1	1–2	—

Source: rsssf.com
Rules for classification: Group stage tiebreakers

=== Group B ===
Pos	Team	Pld	W	D	L	GF	GA	GD	Pts	Qualification	GOL	ZAM	CA	FER
1	(Ghana) Obuasi Goldfields	6	3	1	2	10	5	+5	10	Final	—	3–1	2–0	4–0
2	(Egypt) Zamalek	6	3	0	3	7	8	−1	9		2–0	—	2–0	2–1
3	(Tunisia) Club Africain	6	2	2	2	3	4	−1	8		0–0	2–0	—	1–0
4	(Mozambique) Ferroviário Maputo	6	2	1	3	5	8	−3	7		2–1	2–0	0–0	—

Source: rsssf.com
Rules for classification: Group stage tiebreakers

== Final ==
30 November 1997
--:-- UTC+0

Obuasi Goldfields (Ghana)	1–0	(Morocco) Raja Casablanca
Adjei 79'

Len Clay Stadium, Obuasi
Referee: Sinko Zeli (Ivory Coast)
14 December 1997
--:-- UTC+1

Raja Casablanca (Morocco)	1–0	(Ghana) Obuasi Goldfields
Nazir 78'
Penalties
Nejjary (penalty scored); Ereyahi (penalty scored); Sabir (penalty missed); Ogandaga (penalty missed); Jrindou (penalty scored); Zitouni (penalty scored); Fahmi (penalty scored)	5–4	Okyere (penalty scored); Owusu (penalty missed); Ansah (penalty scored); Ahinful (penalty missed); Issah (penalty scored); Koné (penalty scored); Duah (penalty missed)

Stade Mohamed V, Casablanca
Referee: Lim Kee Chong (Mauritius)

== Top goalscorers ==
The top scorers from the 1997 CAF Champions League are as follows:

Rank	Name	Team	Goals
1	(Togo) Kossi Noutsoudje	(Ghana) Obuasi Goldfields	7
1	(Algeria) Tarek Hadj Adlane	(Algeria) USM Alger	7
3	(Algeria) Billel Dziri	(Algeria) USM Alger	6
4	(Angola) Muanza	(Angola) Primeiro de Agosto	5
4	(Morocco) Abdelkarim Nazir	(Morocco) Raja Casablanca	5
6	(Algeria) Nacer Zekri	(Algeria) USM Alger	4
7	(Egypt) Ahmed El-Kass	(Egypt) Zamalek	3
7	(Ghana) Joe Okyere	(Ghana) Obuasi Goldfields	3
7	(Gabon) Jonas Ogandaga	(Morocco) Raja Casablanca	3
7	(Morocco) Mustapha Moustawdaa	(Morocco) Raja Casablanca	3
7	(Togo) Lantame Ouadja	(Tunisia) Club Africain	3
