= 1997 CAF Champions League group stage =

The group stage of the 1997 CAF Champions League was played from 22 August to 9 November 1997. A total of eight teams competed in the group stage.

== Format ==
In the group stage, each group was played on a home-and-away round-robin basis. The winners of each group advanced directly to the final.

== Groups ==
The matchdays were 22–24 August, 5–7 September, 19–21 September, 1–12 October, 24–26 October, and 7–9 November 1997.

Key to colours in group tables
Group winners advance to the final

=== Group A ===
Pos	Team	Pld	W	D	L	GF	GA	GD	Pts	Qualification
1	(Morocco) Raja Casablanca	6	3	2	1	10	6	+4	11	Final
2	(Algeria) USM Alger	6	3	2	1	9	6	+3	11	
3	(Angola) Primeiro de Agosto	6	3	1	2	7	9	−2	10	
4	(South Africa) Orlando Pirates	6	0	1	5	5	10	−5	1	

Source: rsssf.com
Rules for classification: Group stage tiebreakers
August 22, 1997
15:00 UTC+2

Orlando Pirates (South Africa)	1–2	(Angola) Primeiro de Agosto
? ?'		?' Nsilulu ?' Muanza

Ellis Park, Johannesburg
August 24, 1997
14:00 UTC+1

USM Alger (Algeria)	2–2	(Morocco) Raja Casablanca
Hadj Adlane 17', 85'		39' Nazir; 90+3' Fahmi

Stade 5 Juillet 1962, Algiers
Attendance: 15,000
Referee: Gamal Al-Ghandour (Egypt)

September 5, 1997
15:30 UTC+1

USM Alger (Algeria)	2–1	(South Africa) Orlando Pirates
Ghoul 11' (pen.); Hadj Adlane 47'		41' Ngobe

Stade 5 Juillet 1962, Algiers
Attendance: 10,000
Referee: Lucien Bouchardeau (Niger)
September 7, 1997
15:00 UTC+1

Primeiro de Agosto (Angola)	1–1	(Morocco) Raja Casablanca
Fuidimau 90'		55' Moustawdaa

Estádio da Cidadela, Luanda

September 19, 1997
16:00 UTC+1

Primeiro de Agosto (Angola)	2–1	(Algeria) USM Alger
Fuidimau ?'; Kiss ?' (pen.)		?' Zekri

Estádio da Cidadela, Luanda
Referee: Magassa Sidi Bekaye (Mali)
September 21, 1997
16:00 UTC+1

Raja Casablanca (Morocco)	1–0	(South Africa) Orlando Pirates
Khalif 7'

Stade Mohamed V, Casablanca

October 10, 1997
15:00 UTC+1

Primeiro de Agosto (Angola)	2–1	(South Africa) Orlando Pirates
Lushozi 22' (o.g.); Makita ?'		30' (pen.) ?

Estádio da Cidadela, Luanda
October 12, 1997
15:00 UTC+0

Raja Casablanca (Morocco)	0–2	(Algeria) USM Alger
		68', 75' Dziri

Stade Mohamed V, Casablanca
Attendance: 50,000
Referee: ? (Ghana)

October 24, 1997
15:00 UTC+0

Raja Casablanca (Morocco)	4–0	(Angola) Primeiro de Agosto
Ereyahi 20'; Nazir 28'; Jrindou 45'; Ogandaga ?'

Stade Mohamed V, Casablanca
October 25, 1997
14:00 UTC+2

Orlando Pirates (South Africa)	1–1	(Algeria) USM Alger
? ?'		17' Hadj Adlane

FNB Stadium, Johannesburg
Referee: Charle Masembi (Uganda)

November 8, 1997
14:00 UTC+1

USM Alger (Algeria)	1–0	(Angola) Primeiro de Agosto
Dziri 11'

Stade 5 Juillet 1962, Algiers
Attendance: 50 000
November 8, 1997
15:00 UTC+2

Orlando Pirates (South Africa)	1–2	(Morocco) Raja Casablanca
Lekoelea 88'		(penalty missed) (pen.) 12' Khalif; 26', 90+4' Nazir

FNB Stadium, Johannesburg

=== Group B ===
Pos	Team	Pld	W	D	L	GF	GA	GD	Pts	Qualification
1	(Ghana) Obuasi Goldfields	6	3	1	2	10	5	+5	10	Final
2	(Egypt) Zamalek	6	3	0	3	7	8	−1	9	
3	(Tunisia) Club Africain	6	2	2	2	3	4	−1	8	
4	(Mozambique) Ferroviário Maputo	6	2	1	3	5	8	−3	7	

Source: rsssf.com
Rules for classification: Group stage tiebreakers
August 22, 1997

Zamalek (Egypt)	2–1	(Mozambique) Ferroviário Maputo
Abdel Maguid 4'; El-Said 40'		?' ?

August 24, 1997

Club Africain (Tunisia)	0–0	(Ghana) Obuasi Goldfields

Stade El Menzah, Tunis

September 6, 1997

Ferroviário Maputo (Mozambique)	2–1	(Ghana) Obuasi Goldfields

September 7, 1997

Club Africain (Tunisia)	2–0	(Egypt) Zamalek

September 19, 1997

Ferroviário Maputo (Mozambique)	0–0	(Tunisia) Club Africain

September 21, 1997

Obuasi Goldfields (Ghana)	3–1	(Egypt) Zamalek
Noutsoudje 61', 90+4', 90+5'		90+3' Ramadan

October 1, 1997

Ferroviário Maputo (Mozambique)	2–0	(Egypt) Zamalek

October 12, 1997

Obuasi Goldfields (Ghana)	2–0	(Tunisia) Club Africain
Joe Okyere 13'; Noutsoudje 74'

October 24, 1997

Zamalek (Egypt)	2–0	(Tunisia) Club Africain
Abdel-Aziz 43' (pen.); Ramadan 53'

Osman Ahmed Osman Stadium, Cairo
October 26, 1997

Obuasi Goldfields (Ghana)	4–0	(Mozambique) Ferroviário Maputo
Joe Okyere 30', 66'; Kofi 43'; Noutsoudje 73'

November 7, 1997

Club Africain (Tunisia)	1–0	(Mozambique) Ferroviário Maputo

November 9, 1997

Zamalek (Egypt)	2–0	(Ghana) Obuasi Goldfields
Marei 35'; Sabry 71' (pen.)
