= Udoji United F.C. =

Nigerian football club

Udoji United Football Club was a Nigerian football club founded in 1990 in Enugu before moving to Awka in 1993. It was owned by Oscar Udoji, Owner and CEO of Solgas Petroleum Limited and Superior Motors Limited and son of former businessman/administrator Chief Jerome Oputa Udoji.

After their first season in 1991, they won promotion to the Nigeria Premier League. The team won the title in 1996, thus becoming the Nigerian representative in the CAF Champions League's debut in 1997. They were demoted after the 1998 season but won promotion back to the top league the next season after winning the Division. They however were demoted back after the 2000 season by one point and soon sold.

== Achievements ==
- Nigeria Premier League: 1

1996

- Professional Second Division: 1

1999

== Performance in CAF competitions ==
- CAF Champions League: 1 appearance

1997: Second Round
