= Jerome Udoji =

Nigerian businessman and government official

Chief Jerome Udoji
- Born: 1912; Anambra, Nigeria
- Died: 10 April 2010 (aged 97–98)
- Education: Cambridge University
- Occupations: Philanthropist; Businessman; Government Official; Traditional Ruler
- Board member of: Nigerian Stock Exchange (1981–1986), Solgas Petroleum, Citibank Nigeria, Udoji United F.C.
- Awards: Commander of the Order of the Federal Republic of Nigeria (CFR); Companion of the Order of Saint Michael and Saint George; Papal knight of the Order of Saint Gregory the Great

Chief Jerome Oputa Udoji CMG, CFR (1912–2010), was a Nigerian known for his roles in business administration, government service, philanthropy, and as a traditional leader. He held the title of Igwe Ozuluoha I of Igboland. Udoji gained recognition for his participation in the "Udoji Award" and his various government and private sector contributions. He received his education at the University of Cambridge in England and the Economic Institute of the World Bank in Washington. Udoji held titles such as Companion of the Order of Saint Michael and Saint George (1960), Commander of the Order of the Federal Republic of Nigeria (1963) and Papal knight of the Order of Saint Gregory the Great (1975).

Udoji served as the first Chairman of the Nigeria Stock Exchange, now Nigerian Exchange Group (1981–1986), and the second Chairman of the Manufacturers Association of Nigeria (1982–1987). He was also the chairman of football club Udoji United F.C. which won the Nigeria Premier League title in 1996. The Anambra State government office building in Awka is named in his honor as the Jerome Udoji Secretariat Building, hosting civil servants and state officials.

== Early life and education ==
Born in 1912 in Ozubulu, Ekusigo in Anambra State, Udoji began his education journey at St. Michael's Catholic School, Ozubulu, followed by St. Charles Training College, Onitsha, and later Kings College, Cambridge University, England. He was called to the Bar at Gray's Inn, London, in 1948. Additionally, Udoji pursued further studies at the World Bank, Washington, between 1955 and 1956. Udoji's educational pursuits were complemented by his teaching experiences at schools in Eastern and Western regions, including Ibadan Grammar School and Abeokuta Grammar School. He also served as a secretary in charge of the Western Nigerian provinces.

== Public service ==
Upon his return from England, Udoji embarked on a career in the Colonial Administrative Service. He served as an assistant district officer in Ado Ekiti and later as district officer for Egbado. Udoji's service extended to Ondo and Abeokuta provinces. In 1954, he moved to the Eastern region and assumed the role of permanent secretary in the ministries of Health, Commerce, Finance, and Establishments. By 1959, Udoji was appointed as Head of the Region's civil service, Chief Secretary to the Premier of the Eastern Region, Michael Okpara, and Secretary to the Executive Council. These roles continued until the 1966 Nigerian coup d'état. After this, he briefly practiced law (1966–68) and worked as a Ford Foundation Consultant in Administration and Management (1968–72).

In 1972, during Nigeria's oil boom, the Yakubu Gowon administration asked Udoji to lead a commission reviewing civil service standards and compensation in the country. The commission made recommendations, known as the "Udoji Award," which included salary increases, civil servant training, administrative structure reforms, and the introduction of goal-oriented management. Udoji's contributions extended beyond Nigeria, as he served as the Chairman of the Africanisation Commission of the East African Community in 1963 and participated in various international initiatives.

== Business career and philanthropy ==
In the Nigerian first republic, Udoji represented regional governments in financial concerns like Hotel Presidential, Enugu, and Port Harcourt, as well as Independence Breweries, Umuahia. Due to disagreements with the military authorities in 1966, he transitioned from the regional civil service to practice law briefly before joining Ford Foundation. Udoji served on the board of several companies such as R.T. Briscoe, Nigeria International Bank, Michellin Nigeria, Wiggins Teape, Udoji United F.C., and the Nigerian Tobacco Company. He was also instrumental in the establishment of the Nigerian Stock Exchange (NSE) and served as its first chairman from 1981 to 1986. Udoji's impact on business and society was further exemplified through his roles as the second Chairman of the Manufacturers Association of Nigeria (MAN) from 1982 to 1987. His legacy included contributions to various sectors such as banking, manufacturing, and football.

== International contributions ==
Udoji's influence extended beyond Nigeria's borders. He served as a consultant to the United Nations Conference on the Management of Public Enterprises held in Yugoslavia (1969), played a role in Swaziland (1970) as sole Commissioner for the country's Localization Commission, and functioned as Secretary-General of the African Association for Public Administration and Management (1972–75). His extensive international service also included a United Nations Development Programme appointment to review and re-organize Uganda's Public Service in 1991. He served as one of the legal advisers to the Eastern Region of Nigeria during the Nigerian Constitution Assembly of 1977–1978. Udoji's contributions in international forums underscored his expertise in administrative and management matters.

== Personal and family life ==
Chief Jerome Udoji was married to Marcelina Uzoamaka Udoji. The couple had three children: a daughter, Scholastica, and two sons, Oscar Paul Udoji and Peter Ebelechukwu Udoji. Udoji's family members also made significant contributions to various fields, such as business and politics. Udoji's impact extended to his grandchildren, leaving behind a lasting legacy.

== Legacy ==
Chief Jerome Udoji died on 2 April 2010. Governor Peter Obi of Anambra State and Cardinal Francis Arinze, among others, attended the service and highlighted Udoji's contributions to Nigeria.
