= 2006 Arab Champions League final =

- Event: 2005–06 Arab Champions League
ENPPI	Raja CA
(Egypt)	(Morocco)
1	3

First leg
ENPPI	Raja CA
1	2
- Date: 18 April 2006
- Venue: Osman Ahmed Osman Stadium, Cairo
- Referee: Salim Mahmoud (Jordan)
- Attendance: 20,000

Second leg
Raja CA	ENPPI
1	0
- Date: 6 May 2006
- Venue: Stade Mohamed V, Casablanca
- Referee: Khalil Jalal (Saudi Arabia)
- Attendance: 80,000

The 2006 Arab Champions League final, It was the 22nd final of the UAFA Club Cup and the 3rd under the name of Arab Champions League. the final play as home and away matches, and it was contested between ENPPI of Egypt and Raja CA of Morocco.

== Match details ==
=== First leg ===
18 April 2006
16:00

ENPPI (Egypt)	1–2	(Morocco) Raja CA
Abdel-Aaty 54' (pen.)		Alloudi 11'; Soulaimani 68'

Osman Ahmed Osman Stadium, Cairo
Attendance: 20,000
Referee: Salim Mahmoud (Jordan)

ENPPI	Raja

=== Second leg ===
6 May 2006
19:00

Raja CA (Morocco)	1–0	(Egypt) ENPPI
Alloudi 67'

Stade Mohamed V, Casablanca
Attendance: 80,000
Referee: Khalil Al Ghamdi (Saudi Arabia)

Raja	ENPPI

Assistant referees:
Ibrahim Gazzar (Algeria)
Fathi Al-Arbati (Jordan)
