= Ibrahima Koné (footballer, born 1969) =

Ivorian footballer

Personal information
- Full name: Ibrahima Koné
- Date of birth: 26 July 1969 (age 57)
- Place of birth: Adjamé, Ivory Coast
- Position: Midfielder

Senior career*
| Years | Team | Apps | (Gls) |
| 1992–1997 | Africa Sports d'Abidjan | 3 | (0) |
| 1997–1998 | Obuasi Goldfields | 13 | (0) |
| 1998–2000 | Africa Sports | 7 | (0) |
| 2000–2004 | Étoile Sportive du Sahel | 8 | (0) |
| 2003–2004 | → Al Ahly (Doha) (loan) | 8 | (0) |
| Total | | 39 | (0) |

International career
| 1992–2002 | Ivory Coast | 51 | (2) |
- * Club domestic league appearances and goals

Ibrahima Koné (born 26 July 1969) is a former Ivorian footballer who played as a midfielder for various clubs and the Ivory Coast national football team.
