= Princeton Owusu-Ansah =

Ghanaian footballer

Personal information
- Date of birth: 12 August 1976 (age 50)
- Height: 1.77 m (5 ft 10 in)
- Position: Midfielder

Senior career*
| Years | Team | Apps | (Gls) |
| 1996–2004 | Goldfields Obuasi | | |
| 2004–2005 | Nyíregyháza Spartacus | 3 | (0) |

International career
| 1997–2002 | Ghana | 25 | (1) |
- * Club domestic league appearances and goals

Princeton Owusu-Ansah (born 12 August 1976) is a Ghanaian former professional footballer who played as a midfielder.

He played for Goldfields Obuasi in Ghana for the most part of his career, including one year under the new club name Ashanti Gold S.C. in 2004 before joining Nyíregyháza Spartacus in Hungary for a short spell. He was also capped for Ghana, and was a squad member in the 1997 Korea Cup, 1998 Africa Cup of Nations and the 2002 Africa Cup of Nations.
