= Reda Ereyahi =

Moroccan footballer (born 1972)

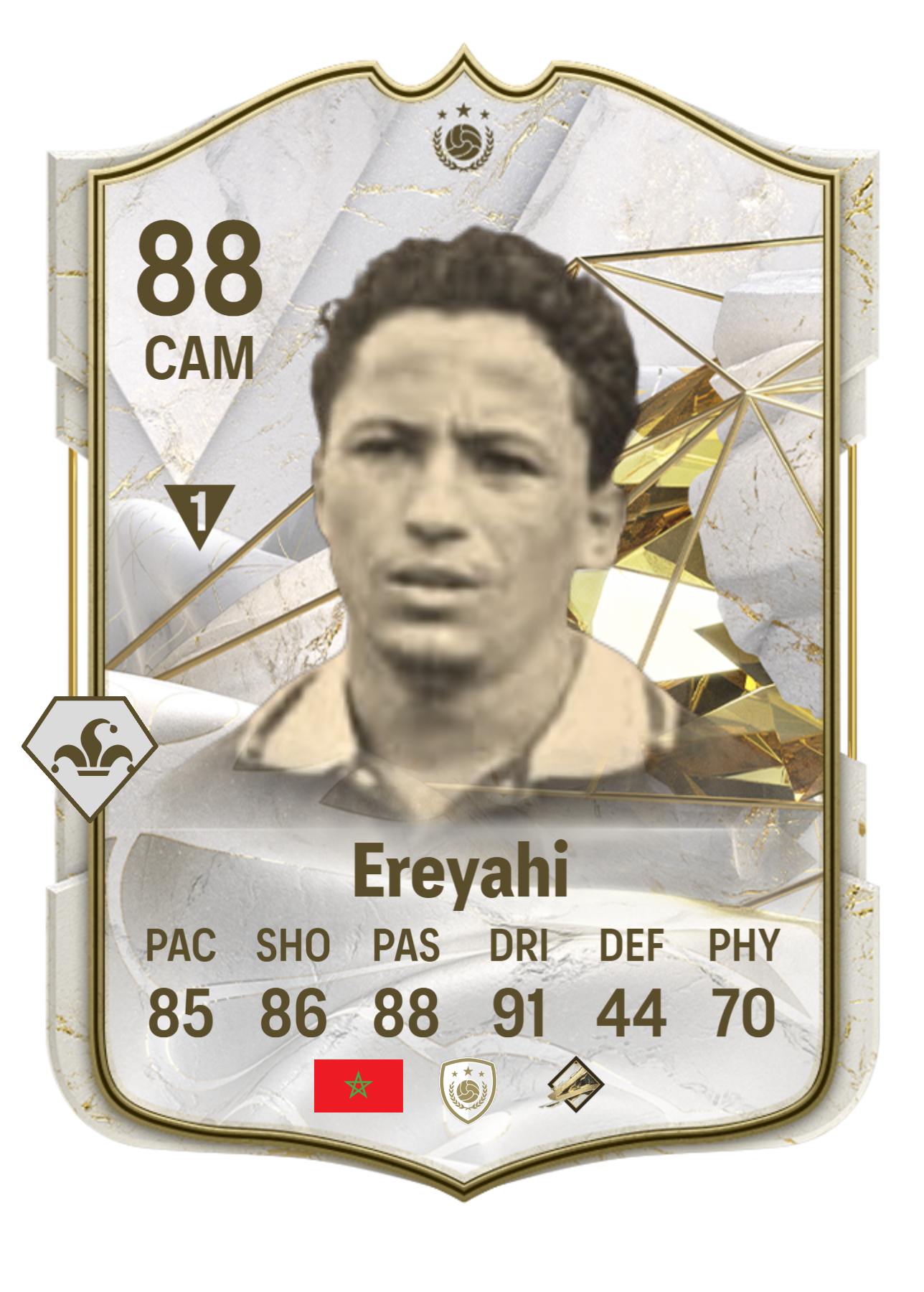

Personal information
- Full name: Reda Ereyahi
- Date of birth: 23 October 1972 (age 54)
- Place of birth: El Jadida, Morocco
- Position: Midfielder

Youth career
- ?–1989: Difaâ Hassani El Jadidi

Senior career*
Years	Team	Apps	(Gls)
1989–1997	Difaâ Hassani El Jadidi		
1997–2000	Raja Casablanca		
2000	Göztepe	9	(0)
- Sharjah FC
2001–2004	Dhafra		
2005–2010	Difaâ Hassani El Jadidi		

International career
1996–1998	Morocco	8	(0)
- * Club domestic league appearances and goals

Reda Ereyahi (born 23 October 1972) is a former Moroccan footballer who usually played as a midfielder.

== Club career ==
Born in El Jadida, Ereyahi began his senior career with local side Difaâ Hassani El Jadidi. A transfer to France with SC Bastia fell through in 1995, and he ultimately moved to Raja Casablanca from 1997 through 2000, where he won two national titles and played in the 2000 FIFA Club World Championship. He then had a spell with Göztepe in the Turkish Super Lig during 2000. 16 years after making his senior debut with Difaâ Hassani El Jadidi, Ereyahi returned to the club, where he would finish his playing career.

== International career ==
Ereyahi has made eight appearances for the Morocco national football team, including two friendlies during 1996 and another in 1998.

== Honours ==
=== Raja Casablanca ===
- Moroccan first division:
  - Winner: 1996–97, 1997–98, 1998–99
  - Runner-up: 2008–09
- CAF Champions League:
  - Winner: 1997, 1999

=== Individual ===
- Best Player of Moroccan first division: 1997–98 / 2008-2009
- Top scorer of Moroccan 2nd division: 2004–05
