= Jonas Ogandaga =

Gabonese footballer

Personal information
- Date of birth: 1 August 1975 (age 51)
- Position: Midfielder

Senior career*
Years	Team	Apps	(Gls)
1992–1993	Petrosport		
1993–1994	Sogara		
1994–1996	Mbilinga		
1996–1998	Raja Casablanca		
1998–1999	Olympique Kef		
1999–2003	Medenine		
2003–2009	Stade Mandji		

International career
1991–2000	Gabon	50	(4)
- * Club domestic league appearances and goals

Jonas Ogandaga (born 1 August 1975) is a Gabonese former professional footballer who last played as a midfielder.

He played for Petrosport, Sogara, Mbilinga, Raja Casablanca, Olympique Kef, Medenine, and Stade Mandji. He also played for the Gabon national team between 1993 and 2000. He played in three tournaments; the 1994, 1996 and 2000 African Cup of Nations.

== Career statistics ==
=== International ===
Appearances and goals by national team and year
National team	Year	Apps	Goals
Gabon	1991	1	0
Gabon	1992	5	0
Gabon	1993	7	0
Gabon	1994	1	0
Gabon	1995	9	1
Gabon	1996	7	1
Gabon	1997	7	0
Gabon	1998	2	1
Gabon	1999	7	1
Gabon	2000	4	0
Total		50	4

Scores and results list Gabon's goal tally first, score column indicates score after each Ogandaga goal.

List of international goals scored by Passang Tshering
No.	Date	Venue	Opponent	Score	Result	Competition
1	22 December 1995	Stade du 4 Août, Ouagadougou, Burkina Faso	Burkina Faso	3–2	5–2	Friendly
2	2 June 1996	Somhlolo National Stadium, Lobamba, Swaziland	Swaziland	1–0	1–0	1998 FIFA World Cup qualification
3	4 October 1998	Stade Omar Bongo, Libreville, Gabon	Mauritius	2–0	2–0	2000 Africa Cup of Nations qualification
4	27 December 1999	28 March Stadium, Benghazi, Libya	Togo	1–0	3–2	1999 Great Artificial River Tournament
