= Abdellatif Jrindou =

Moroccan footballer and manager

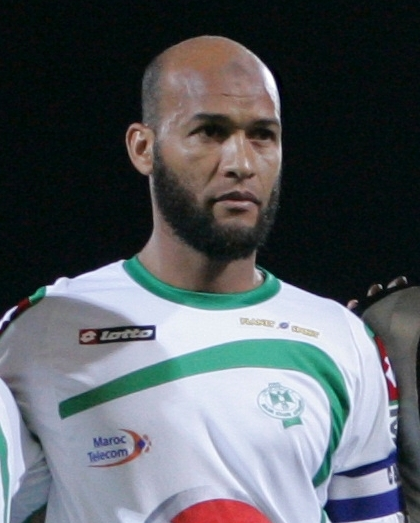
Abdellatif Jrindou

Abdellatif Jrindou (Arabic: عبد اللطيف جريندو) (born 1 October 1974) is a retired Moroccan football Defender.

In his career, Jrindou played for Olympique Casablanca in Morocco, Al-Ahli in UAE, Al-Ittifaq in Saudi Arabia and Raja Casablanca.

Jrindou has made several appearances for the Morocco national football team.

He is currently the manager of Moghreb Atlético Tetuán.
