= Ahmed Zabana Stadium =

Multi-purpose stadium in Oran, Algeria

- Zabana Stadium
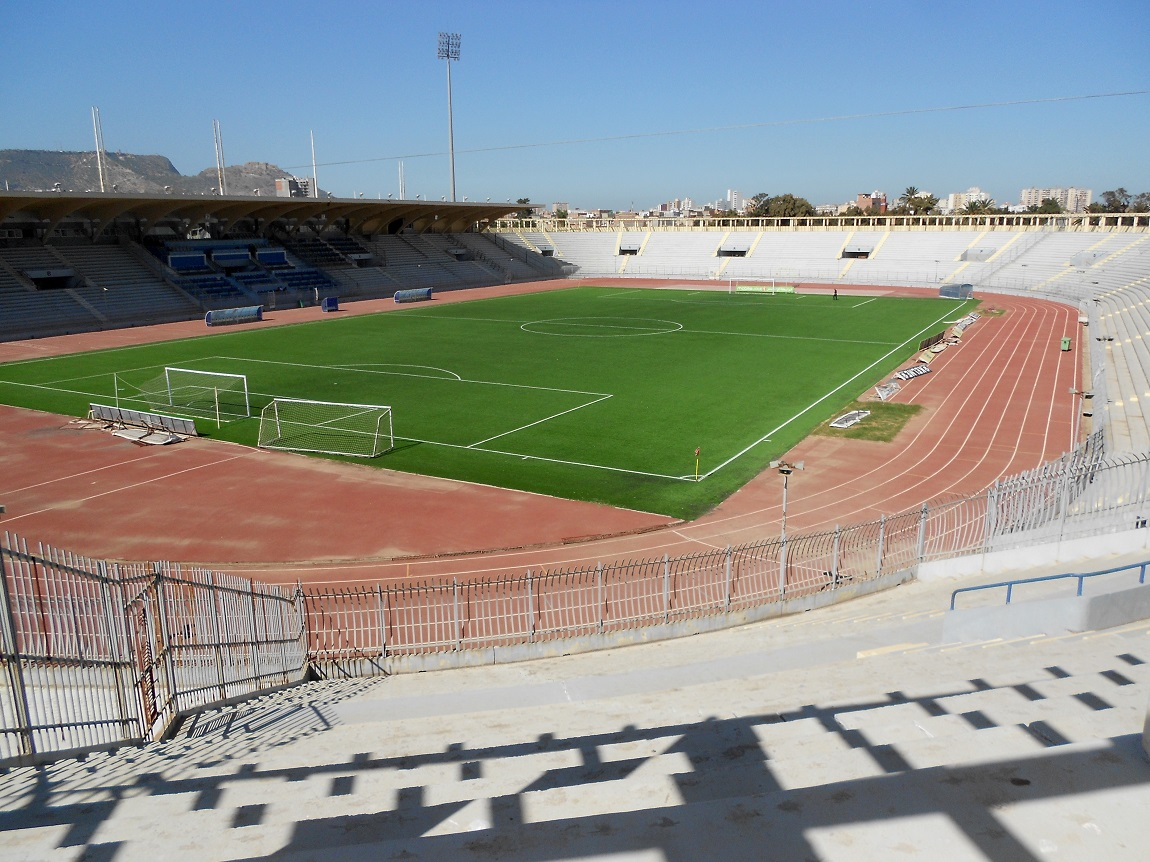
- Interactive map of Ahmed Zabana Stadium
- Full name: Ahmed Zabana Stadium
- Former names: Parc Municipal des Sports; Henri Fouquès-Duparc; Municipal; 19 June 1965
- Location: El Hamri, Oran, Algeria
- Coordinates: 35.683315°N 0.636221°W
- Owner: APC of Oran
- Capacity: 40,000
- Surface: Artificial turf
- Record attendance: 60,000 Algeria-Brazil (17 June 1965)

Construction
- Built: 1955
- Opened: 5 May 1957 (69 years ago)
- Renovated: 1974, 1988, 2005, 2008, 2013

Tenants
- ASM Oran (football); Stade Oranais (rugby); Algeria rugby union team

Ahmed Zabana Stadium (Arabic: ملعب أحمد زبانة) is a multi-purpose stadium in Oran, Algeria. It is currently used mostly for football matches. It is the home ground of MC Oran. The capacity of the stadium holds 40,000. It is located near the centre of Oran.

== History ==
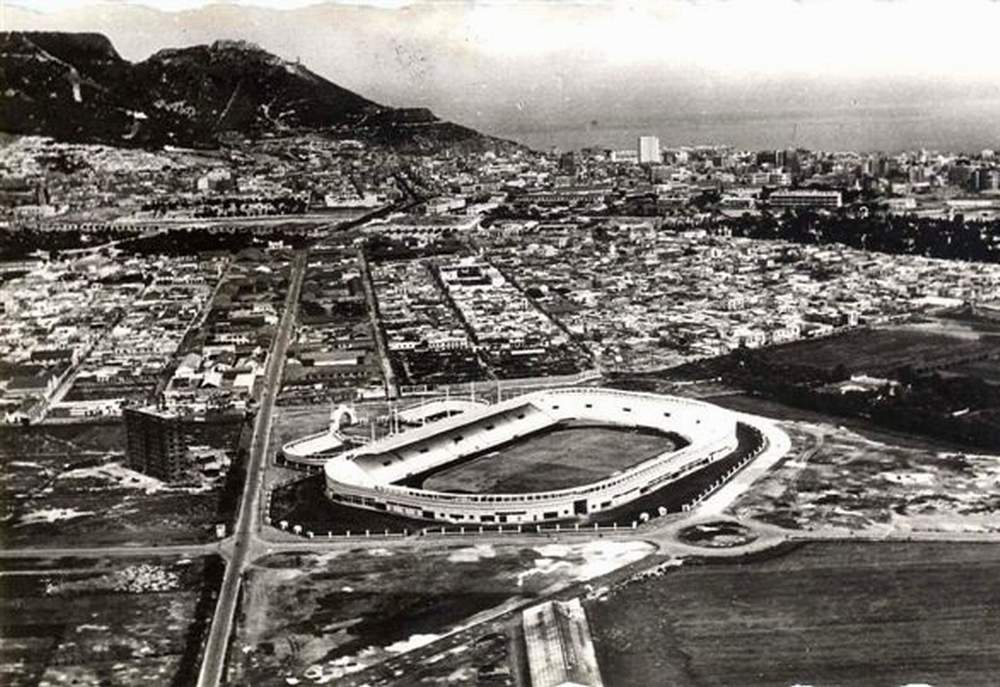
Old picture of the stadium

The stadium was built in 1955 in the El Hamri district of Oran, known as Lyautey at the time, by mayor Henri Fouquès-Duparc. The stadium was inaugurated on 5 May 1957 with a capacity of 40,000 spectators, making it the biggest stadium in Africa at the time. After the independence of Algeria it was renamed Municipal Stadium. After it was named again Stade du 19 Juin 1956 in commemoration of the military coup of Ahmed Ben Bella by Houari Boumediene made at that date.

In 1992, the stadium was then renamed again to Stade Ahmed Zabana by the Algerian president at this time Mohamed Boudiaf, in honor of Algerian revolutionary Ahmed Zabana.

In January 2008, it was renovated to make it compatible with the practice of Rugby union. It was equipped with artificial turf (fifth generation) to replace natural grass in poor condition.

== Matches ==
These are some historically important matches that have been played in the stadium around its history:

=== Football matches ===
==== Clubs ====
Club matches

5 May 1957 Friendly (Inauguration of the stadium)	Stade Reims (France)	4–1	(France) AS Saint-Étienne	Oran
15:45 UTC+01:00		Report		Stadium: Henri Fouques-Duparc Stadium; Attendance: 40 000

... ... 1958 1958–59 Coupe de France - round of 64	SC Bel Abbès (France)	0–1 (a.e.t.)	(France) Stade Rennais UC	Oran
--:-- UTC+01:00				Stadium: Henri Fouques-Duparc Stadium

... ... 1958 1958–59 Coupe de France - round of 32	RC Paris (France)	6–2	(France) US Forbach	Oran
--:-- UTC+01:00				Stadium: Henri Fouques-Duparc Stadium

8 May 1958 Friendly	Stade Reims (France)	2–5	(Spain) Real Madrid	Oran
--:-- UTC+01:00				Stadium: Henri Fouques-Duparc Stadium; Attendance: 45 000

25 May 1958 1958 Algerian Cup (FFF) - final	SC Bel Abbès (France)	4–0	(France) AS Saint Eugène	Oran
--:-- UTC+01:00				Stadium: Henri Fouques-Duparc Stadium

... ... 1959 Friendly	OGC Nice (France)	–	(Spain) Atlético Madrid	Oran
--:-- UTC+01:00				Stadium: Henri Fouques-Duparc Stadium

22 February 1959 1958–59 Coupe de France - round of 16	Olympique Lyonnais (France)	3–1 (a.e.t.)	(France) Stade de Reims	Oran
--:-- UTC+01:00				Stadium: Henri Fouques-Duparc Stadium

5 April 1959 1959 Algerian Cup (FFF) - final	SC Bel Abbès (France)	1–0	(France) SS La Marsa	Oran
--:-- UTC+01:00				Stadium: Henri Fouques-Duparc Stadium

12 April 1959 1958–59 Coupe de France - semifinal	FC Sochaux-Montbéliard (France)	2–1	(France) Stade Rennais	Oran
--:-- UTC+01:00				Stadium: Henri Fouques-Duparc Stadium

24 December 1959 Gala of the 1958–59 European Cup finalists	Stade Reims (France)	1–2	(Spain) Real Madrid	Oran
--:-- UTC+01:00				Stadium: Henri Fouques-Duparc Stadium; Attendance: 45 000

24 December 1960 Friendly	Stade Reims (France)	1–3	(Spain) Real Madrid	Oran
--:-- UTC+01:00				Stadium: Henri Fouques-Duparc Stadium; Attendance: 45 000

16 May 1961 1961 Algerian Cup (FFF) - final	Pérregaux GS (France)	2–1	(France) GS Alger	Oran
--:-- UTC+01:00				Stadium: Henri Fouques-Duparc Stadium

30 March 1966 Air Algérie Tournament - semifinal	Real Madrid (Spain)	1–0	(Brazil) Vasco da Gama	Oran
--:-- UTC+01:00				Stadium: 19 June Stadium; Attendance: 45 000

... ... 1971 Friendly	MC Oran (Algeria)	3–2	(Germany) FV Frankfurt	Oran
--:-- UTC+01:00	Mehdi 2', 43'; Fréha 8'		Winter 33'; Thiel 83'	Stadium: 19 June Stadium; Referee: ... Kaïd

8 February 1988 Friendly	Mouloudia d'Oran (Algeria)	4–1	(East Germany) FC Magdeburg	Oran
--:-- UTC+01:00		Report		Stadium: 19 June Stadium

15 December 1989 1989 CAF C1 final - 2ndleg	MC Oran (Algeria)	1–0 (2–4 p)	(Morocco) Raja Casablanca	Oran
16:00 UTC+1	Sebbah 43' (pen.)			Stadium: 19 June Stadium; Attendance: 45,000; Referee: Mohamed Hafez (Egypt)
	Penalties
	Belloumi (penalty scored); Sebbah (penalty scored); Bott (penalty missed); Benhalima (penalty missed)		(penalty scored) Diagne; (penalty scored) Khalef; (penalty scored) Kadmiri; (penalty scored) Madih

25 June 1992 1992 Algerian Cup - final	JS Kabylie (Algeria)	1–0	(Algeria) ASO Chlef	Oran
16:30 UTC+1	Amaouche 87'			Stadium: Ahmed Zabana Stadium; Attendance: 40,000; Referee: Messaoud Koussa

30 May 1999 1999 Algerian National Championship - final	MC Alger (Algeria)	1–0 (a.e.t.)	(Algeria) JS Kabylie	Oran
16:00 UTC+1	Rahmouni 118'			Stadium: Ahmed Zabana Stadium; Attendance: 40,000; Referee: ... Djaballah

8 March 2017 2017 Algerian W-League Cup - final	ASE Alger Centre (Algeria)	1–0 (4–3 p)	(Algeria) AS Sûreté Nationale	Oran
16:00 UTC+1	Marek 7'		Chaouche 59' (pen.)	Stadium: Ahmed Zabana Stadium; Referee: Nabil Boukhalfa

15 May 2018 2018 Algerian W-League Cup - final	ASE Alger Centre (Algeria)	0–0 (5–4 p)	(Algeria) FC Constantine	Oran
16:00 UTC+1				Stadium: Ahmed Zabana Stadium

==== National ====
===== Football events =====
International tournaments

15 May 1960 1960 World Military Cup - final group	France	1–1	Belgium	Oran
--:-- UTC+1				Stadium: Henri Fouques-Duparc Stadium

15 May 1960 1960 World Military Cup - final group	Turkey	1–0	Greece	Oran
--:-- UTC+1				Stadium: Henri Fouques-Duparc Stadium

19 May 1960 1960 World Military Cup - final group	Belgium	2–2	Greece	Oran
--:-- UTC+1				Stadium: Henri Fouques-Duparc Stadium

19 May 1960 1960 World Military Cup - final group	France	0–0	Turkey	Oran
--:-- UTC+1				Stadium: Henri Fouques-Duparc Stadium

22 May 1960 1960 World Military Cup - final group	Greece	3–2	France	Oran
--:-- UTC+1				Stadium: Henri Fouques-Duparc Stadium

22 May 1960 1960 World Military Cup - final group	Belgium	1–0	Turkey	Oran
--:-- UTC+1				Stadium: Henri Fouques-Duparc Stadium

17 March 2013 2013 African U-20 Championship - group B	Nigeria	0–1	Mali	Oran
17:30 UTC+1			Niane 12'	Stadium: Ahmed Zabana Stadium; Referee: Bamlak Tessema (Ethiopia)

17 March 2013 2013 African U-20 Championship - group B	DR Congo	0–0	Gabon	Oran
20:30 UTC+1				Stadium: Ahmed Zabana Stadium; Referee: Mehdi Abid Charef (Algeria)

20 March 2013 2013 African U-20 Championship - group B	Mali	2–1	DR Congo	Oran
17:30 UTC+1	Diallo 51'; Niane 60'		Eddy Ngoyi 55'	Stadium: Ahmed Zabana Stadium; Referee: Thierry Nkurunziza (Burundi)

20 March 2013 2013 African U-20 Championship - group B	Gabon	0–1	Nigeria	Oran
20:30 UTC+1			Ajagun 21' (pen.)	Stadium: Ahmed Zabana Stadium; Referee: Youssef Essrayri (Tunisia)

23 March 2013 2013 African U-20 Championship - group B	Nigeria	3–1	DR Congo	Oran
17:30 UTC+1	Ajagun 34' (pen.); Umar 39', 48'		Pembele 73'	Stadium: Ahmed Zabana Stadium; Referee: Hudu Munyemana (Rwanda)

23 March 2013 2013 African U-20 Championship - group A	Benin	0–1	Egypt	Oran
20:30 UTC+1			Kahraba 22'	Stadium: Ahmed Zabana Stadium; Referee: Juste Zio (Burkina Faso)

26 March 2013 2013 African U-20 Championship - semifinal	Ghana	0–0 (a.e.t.) (4–2 p)	Mali	Oran
20:30 UTC+1				Stadium: Ahmed Zabana Stadium; Referee: Reinhold Shikongo (Namibia)

29 March 2013 2013 African U-20 Championship - third place match	Nigeria	2–1	Mali	Oran
17:30 UTC+1	Umar 72', 82'		Keita 87'	Stadium: Ahmed Zabana Stadium; Referee: Youssef Essrayri (Tunisia)

30 March 2013 2013 African U-20 Championship - final	Ghana	1–1 (a.e.t.) (4–5 p)	Egypt	Oran
17:30 UTC+1	Ofori 7' (pen.)	Report	Gomaa 4' (pen.)	Stadium: Ahmed Zabana Stadium; Attendance: 20,000; Referee: Reinhold Shikongo (Namibia)
	Penalties
	Nketiah (penalty scored); Akorful (penalty scored); Atamah (penalty missed); Lartey (penalty scored); Ofori (penalty scored); Anaba (penalty missed)		(penalty missed) Rabia; (penalty scored) Gomaa; (penalty scored) Samir; (penalty scored) Refeat; (penalty scored) Kahraba; (penalty scored) Ghali

26 June 2022 2022 Mediterranean Games - Group B	Italy	1–0	Portugal	Oran
20:00 UTC+1	Raimondo 77'	Report		Stadium: Ahmed Zabana Stadium; Referee: Karim Sabry (Morocco)

28 June 2022 2022 Mediterranean Games - Group A	Spain	1–1	France	Oran
20:00 UTC+1	Gómez 47'	Report	Dimi 55'	Stadium: Ahmed Zabana Stadium; Referee: Zorbay Küçük (Turkey)

30 June 2022 2022 Mediterranean Games - Group A	Algeria	2–3	France	Oran
20:00 UTC+1	Chegra 56' (pen.); Zaoui 79'	Report	Messoussa 8', 28'; Bouanani 81' (pen.)	Stadium: Ahmed Zabana Stadium; Attendance: 40,000; Referee: Luca Pairetto (Italy)

===== Algeria NT =====
Algeria NT matches

16 October 1962 Friendly	Algeria	1–2	(France) Nîmes Ol.	Oran
--:-- UTC+1	Bouhizeb 1'	Report	Bessonnart 24'; Parodi 68'	Stadium: Municipal Stadium; Attendance: 15,000

26 February 1963 Friendly	Algeria	0–2	Czechoslovakia Ol.	Oran
--:-- UTC+1			Kos 66'; Knebort 75'	Stadium: Municipal Stadium; Attendance: 15,000; Referee: ... Bendjadi

28 February 1963 Friendly	Algeria	4–0	Czechoslovakia Ol.	Oran
--:-- UTC+1	Soukhane 45'; Mekhloufi 65' (pen.), 88'; Boukhalfa 88'			Stadium: Municipal Stadium; Attendance: 15,000; Referee: Abdelaziz Chekaïmi

7 July 1963 Friendly	Algeria	2–2	United Arab Republic	Oran
--:-- UTC+1	Mekhloufi 44'; Salem 89'		Reyadh 41'; Badawi 60'	Stadium: Municipal Stadium; Attendance: 15,000; Referee: ... Mokhtari

7 October 1964 Friendly	Algeria	1–0	Romania Ol.	Oran
--:-- UTC+1	Aouadj 72'			Stadium: Municipal Stadium; Attendance: 16,000; Referee: ... Mokhtari

17 June 1965 Friendly	Algeria	0–3	Brazil	Oran
--:-- UTC+1			Pelé 18'; Dudu 29'; Gérson 81'	Stadium: Municipal Stadium; Attendance: 60,000; Referee: Antonio Piaz (Spain)

24 December 1966 Friendly	Algeria	4–1	(France) AS Angoulême	Oran
--:-- UTC+1	Hachouf; Lalmas; Amirouche		?	Stadium: 19 June Stadium

25 December 1966 Friendly	Algeria	1–3	(France) AS Béziers	Oran
--:-- UTC+1	Achour		Goal	Stadium: 19 June Stadium

12 March 1967 1968 AFCON qualification - group 2	Algeria	1–0	Mali	Oran
--:-- UTC+1	Hachouf 31'			Stadium: 19 June Stadium

30 October 1967 Friendly	Algeria	0–1	(Poland) Legia Warsaw	Oran
--:-- UTC+1			?	Stadium: 19 June Stadium

1 November 1968 Friendly	Algeria	0–0	Soviet Union	Oran
--:-- UTC+1				Stadium: 19 June Stadium

22 December 1968 Friendly	Algeria	1–1	France Ol.	Oran
--:-- UTC+1	Goal		Goal	Stadium: 19 June Stadium

9 February 1969 Friendly	Algeria	1–1	(Brazil) Santos FC	Oran
--:-- UTC+1	Fréha 76'	Report	Toninho Guerreiro 42'	Stadium: 19 June Stadium; Attendance: 50 000; Referee: Slimane Kaïd

15 January 1970 Friendly	Algeria	3–1	(France) AS Saint-Étienne	Oran
--:-- UTC+1	Tchalabi; Lalmas; Tahir		?	Stadium: 19 June Stadium

13 January 1971 Friendly	Algeria	1–2	France Ol.	Oran
--:-- UTC+1	Fréha		Goal	Stadium: 19 June Stadium

3 May 1974 Friendly	Algeria	3–1	(England) Sheffield Wednesday	Oran
--:-- UTC+1	Belkedrouci; Lalmas; Belbahri		?	Stadium: 19 June Stadium

29 January 1975 Friendly	Algeria	1–0	(France) Paris SG	Oran
--:-- UTC+1	Salhi 63'	Report		Stadium: 19 June Stadium; Attendance: 30 000

26 February 1975 Friendly	Algeria	2–0	(Brazil) Botafogo FR	Oran
--:-- UTC+1	Safsafi; Dali			Stadium: 19 June Stadium

26 February 1975 1976 AFCON qualification - 1st round (2nd leg)	Algeria	1–2	Tunisia	Oran
--:-- UTC+1	Ighil 59'		Khouini 44', 89'	Stadium: 19 June Stadium

14 October 1975 Friendly	Algeria	1–1	(Brazil) Portuguesa	Oran
--:-- UTC+1	Benkada		?	Stadium: 19 June Stadium

13 June 1980 1982 FIFA World Cup qualification - 1st round (2nd leg)	Algeria	3–1	Sierra Leone	Oran
--:-- UTC+1	Fergani 42'; Bensaoula 47'; Madjer 78'		Johnson 79'	Stadium: 19 June Stadium; Attendance: 50 000; Referee: Yousef El-Ghoul (Libya)

3 April 1981 Friendly	Algeria	2–0	Senegal	Oran
--:-- UTC+1	Kouici 39'; Assad 44'			Stadium: 19 June Stadium; Attendance: 40 000

10 April 1981 1982 AFCON qualification - 1st round (1st leg)	Algeria	5–1	Mali	Oran
--:-- UTC+1	Bensaoula 18'; Guendouz 28'; Madjer 56', 71'; I. Traoré 72' (o.g.)		Bagayoko 12'	Stadium: 19 June Stadium; Attendance: 50 000; Referee: Tesfaye Gebreyesus (Ethiopia)

30 April 1981 1982 AFCON qualification - 2nd round (1st leg)	Algeria	7–0	Upper Volta	Oran
--:-- UTC+1	Madjer 31', 37'; Belloumi 53', 56'; Aït El-Hocine 68', 80'; Assad 81'			Stadium: 19 June Stadium; Attendance: 50 000; Referee: Yousef El-Ghoul (Libya)

24 February 1983 Friendly	Algeria	2–0	(Socialist Federal Republic of Yugoslavia) SD Vojvodina	Oran
--:-- UTC+1	Menad; Guendouz			Stadium: 19 June Stadium

14 August 1992 1994 AFCON qualification - Group 3	Algeria	3–1	Guinea-Bissau	Oran
--:-- UTC+1	Meziane 13'; Rahmouni 20'; Saïb 49'		Sirou 60'	Stadium: Ahmed Zabana Stadium; Attendance: 30 000; Referee: Kadry Abdel Azim (Egypt)

27 March 2005 2006 (FIFA WC / AFCON) qualif. - 2nd round (Gr. 4)	Algeria	1–0	Rwanda	Oran
19:00 UTC+1	Boutabout 48'	Report		Stadium: Ahmed Zabana Stadium; Attendance: 45 000; Referee: Essam Abdel-Fatah (Egypt)

19 June 2005 2006 (FIFA WC / AFCON) qualif. - 2nd round (Gr. 4)	Algeria	2–2	Zimbabwe	Oran
20:30 UTC+1	Yahia 17'; Daoud 48'	Report	Kaondera 33'; P. Ndlovu 87'	Stadium: Ahmed Zabana Stadium; Attendance: 15 000; Referee: Lassina Paré (Burkina Faso)

4 September 2005 2006 (FIFA WC / AFCON) qualif. - 2nd round (Gr. 4)	Algeria	2–5	Nigeria	Oran
20:30 UTC+1	Yacef 48'; Boutabout 58'	Report	Martins 20' (pen.), 88', 90'; Utaka 42'; Obodo 81'	Stadium: Ahmed Zabana Stadium; Attendance: 11 000; Referee: Abdul-Hakim Al-Shalmani (Libya)

=== Rugby Union matches ===
Friendlies rugby matches

18 December 2015	Algeria	16–6	Tunisia	Ahmed Zabana Stadium, Oran
15:00 UTC+1		Report		Attendance: 10 000

Rugby NT official matches

17 December 2016	Algeria	11–12	Morocco	Ahmed Zabana Stadium, Oran
15:00 (GMT+1)	Try: Youcef 79' m Con: Bensalla (0/1); Pen: Bensalla (2/3) 31', 58'	Report	Pen: Rousseau (2/2) 14', 18'; Jouadat (1/1) 42'; Gendre (1/1) 67'	Attendance: 2 500; Referee: Salem Attalah (France)

21 December 2016	Tunisia	12–14	Morocco	Ahmed Zabana Stadium, Oran
15:00 (GMT+1)		Report		Attendance: 100; Referee: Sylvain Mane (Senegal)

24 December 2016	Algeria	15–16	Tunisia	Ahmed Zabana Stadium, Oran
15:00 (GMT+1)	Pen: Bensalla (5/5) 2', 7', 31', 60', 69'	Report	Try: Khalfi 79'; Con: Khalfi; Pen: Khalfi (3/3) 17', 47', 65'	Attendance: 300; Referee: Atef Yacoubi (Tunisia)

== Statistic matches of Algeria football NT ==
Stadium	P	W	D	L	GF	GA	GD	Win %	First Match	Most Recent
Municipal / 19 June / Ahmed Zabana Stadium	29	14	5	10	53	35	+18	48.28%	16 October 1962, v. Nîmes Ol.	4 September 2005, v. Nigeria

== See also ==
- List of football stadiums in Algeria
- List of African stadiums by capacity
- List of association football stadiums by capacity
- Miloud Hadefi Stadium

== Notes & references ==
=== References ===
Events
Preceded by Stadio Artemio Franchi; Florence	World Military Cup; Final Venue; 1960	Succeeded by 19 Mayıs Stadium; Ankara
Preceded by Stade Mohamed V Casablanca	CAF Champions League; Final Venue; 1989	Succeeded by Stade 5 Juillet 1962; Algiers
Preceded by Dobsonville Stadium; Johannesburg	African U-20 Championship; Final Venue; 2013	Succeeded by Stade Leopold Senghor; Dakar
Preceded by none	North African Tri Nations; Final Venue; 2016	Succeeded by Stade Mohamed V Casablanca
