= 1989 African Cup of Champions Clubs final =

1989 African Champions Cup final
Raja CA	MC Oran
(Morocco)	(Algeria)
1	1
- Raja CA won 4–2 on penalties

First leg
Raja CA	MC Oran
1	0
- Date: 3 December 1989
- Venue: Stade Mohamed V, Casablanca
- Man of the Match: Said Ait Salah (Raja CA)
- Referee: Badara Sène (Senegal)
- Attendance: 50,000
- Weather: Rainy

Second leg
MC Oran	Raja CA
1	0
- Raja CA won 4–2 on penalties
- Date: 15 December 1989
- Venue: Stade du 19 Juin (Note: Stade 19 Juin 1965 is cold Stade Ahmed Zabana since 1992.It was renamed by the president Mohamed Boudiaf.), Oran
- Referee: Mohamed Hafez (Egypt)
- Attendance: 45,000
- Weather: Cloudy

The 1989 African Cup of Champions Clubs final was a football tie held over two legs in December 1989 between Raja Casablanca football club of Morocco, and Algeria's MC Oran.

== Road to the final ==
(Morocco) Raja CA				Round	(Algeria) MC Oran			
Opponent	Agg.	1st leg	2nd leg	Round	Opponent	Agg.	1st leg	2nd leg
Bye				Preliminary round	Bye			
(Senegal) ASC Jeanne d'Arc	2–1	2–0 (home)	0–1 (away)	First round	(Libya) Al-Ittihad Tripoli	(walkover)		
(Gabon) JAC Port-Gentil	1–1	0–0 (home)	1–1 (away)	Second round	(Tunisia) ES Tunis	5–4	2–3 (away)	3–1 (home)
(Republic of the Congo) Inter Club Brazzaville	2–1	2–0 (home)	0–1 (away)	Quarter-finals	(Sudan) Al-Mourada	4–1	0–1 (away)	4–0 (home)
(Cameroon) Tonnerre Yaoundé	4–2	2–0 (home)	2–2 (away)	Semi-finals	(Zambia) Nkana Red Devils	5–3	0–1 (away)	5–2 (home)

== First leg ==
=== Match details ===
3 December 1989
17:00 UTC+0

Raja CA (Morocco)	1–0	(Algeria) MC Oran
Diagne 50'

Stade Mohamed V, Casablanca
Attendance: 50,000
Referee: Badara Sène (Senegal)

Raja CA	MC Oran

Raja CA:
GK	1	(Morocco) Said Ait Salah
DF	2	(Morocco) Abdelghani Zerraf
DF	3	(Morocco) Khalid Moussalik
DF	5	(Morocco) Hassan Mouahid
MF	4	(Morocco) Mohamed Madih
MF	6	(Morocco) Said Seddiki (c)	(yellow card) 82'
MF	8	(Morocco) Mustapha Khalif
FW	9	(Senegal) Salif Diagne
MF	10	(Morocco) Fawzi Kadmiri
FW	11	(Morocco) Abderrahim Hamraoui		(substituted off) 45'
DF	15	(Morocco) Mustapha Souhil
Substitutes:
GK	12	(Morocco) Hassan Mandoun
	13	(Morocco) Abdeljalil El-Bouchari
FW	14	(Morocco) Bouazza Ould Mou		(substituted on) 45'
	16	(Morocco) Rachid Jabri
Manager:
(Algeria) Rabah Saâdane

MC Oran:
GK	1	(Algeria) Baroudi Berkane-Krachaï
DF	2	(Algeria) Tayeb Foussi
DF	3	(Algeria) Arezki Lebbah
DF	4	(Algeria) Ouanes Mechkour
DF	5	(Algeria) Ali Benhalima	(yellow card) 79'
MF	6	(Algeria) Tahar Cherif El-Ouazzani
FW	7	(Algeria) Bachir Mecheri
MF	8	(Algeria) Benyagoub Sebbah	(yellow card) 9'	(substituted off) 75'
MF	9	(Algeria) Boutkhil Benyoucef
MF	10	(Algeria) Lakhdar Belloumi (c)
FW	11	(Algeria) Mourad Meziane
Substitutes:
DF	12	(Algeria) Redouane Arif
MF	13	(Algeria) Larbi Larbi	(yellow card) 79'	(substituted on) 75'
FW	14	(Algeria) Abdelhafid Bouresla
MF	15	(Algeria) Abdelkader Belhadef
GK	16	(Algeria) Nacer Benchiha
Manager:
(Algeria) Abdelkader Maatallah
Technical Director:
(Algeria) Amar Rouaï

Assistant referees:
Bakary Sarr (Senegal)
Cheikh Djibril MBaye (Senegal)
Fourth official:
Larbi El Abbasi (Morocco)

Man of the Match:
Said Ait Salah (Raja CA)

== Second leg ==
=== Match details ===
15 December 1989
16:00 UTC+1

MC Oran (Algeria)	1–0	(Morocco) Raja CA
Sebbah 43' (pen.)
Penalties
Sebbah (penalty scored); Benhalima (penalty missed); Maroc (penalty scored); Bott (penalty missed)	2–4	(penalty scored) Diagne; (penalty scored) Khalif; (penalty scored) Kadmiri; (penalty scored) Madih

Stade du 19 Juin, Oran
Attendance: 45,000
Referee: Mohamed Hafez (Egypt)

MC Oran	Raja CA

MC Oran:
GK	1	(Algeria) Baroudi Berkane-Krachaï
DF	2	(Algeria) Tayeb Foussi
DF	3	(Algeria) Arezki Lebbah		(substituted off) 50'
DF	4	(Algeria) Ouanes Mechkour	(yellow card) ...'
DF	5	(Algeria) Ali Benhalima
MF	6	(Algeria) Tahar Cherif El-Ouazzani
FW	7	(Algeria) Bachir Mecheri
MF	8	(Algeria) Benyagoub Sebbah	(yellow card) ...'
MF	10	(Algeria) Lakhdar Belloumi (c)
FW	11	(Algeria) Mourad Meziane		(substituted off) 81'
MF	-	(Algeria) Karim Maroc
Substitutes:
MF	9	(Algeria) Boutkhil Benyoucef
DF	12	(Algeria) Redouane Arif
MF	13	(Algeria) Larbi Larbi		(substituted on) 81'
FW	14	(Algeria) Abdelhafid Bouresla
MF	15	(Algeria) Abdelkader Belhadef
GK	16	(Algeria) Nacer Benchiha
DF	-	(Algeria) Abdelaziz Bott		(substituted on) 50'
Manager:
(Algeria) Abdelkader Maatallah
Technical Director:
(Algeria) Amar Rouaï

Raja CA:
GK	1	(Morocco) Hassan Mandoun	(yellow card) ...'
DF	3	(Morocco) Khalid Moussalik	(yellow card) ...'
MF	4	(Morocco) Mohamed Madih
DF	5	(Morocco) Hassan Mouahid (c)	(yellow card) ...'
MF	8	(Morocco) Mustapha Khalif	(red card) ...'
FW	9	(Senegal) Salif Diagne
MF	10	(Morocco) Fawzi Kadmiri
FW	14	(Morocco) Bouazza Ould Mou	(yellow card) ...'
DF	15	(Morocco) Mustapha Souhil
MF	-	(Morocco) Ahmed Bartal	(yellow card) ...'
MF	-	(Morocco) Fathi Jamal
Substitutes:
DF	2	(Morocco) Abdelghani Zerraf
FW	11	(Morocco) Abderrahim Hamraoui
GK	12	(Morocco) Said Ait Salah
	13	(Morocco) Abdeljalil El-Bouchari
	16	(Morocco) Rachid Jabri
Manager:
(Algeria) Rabah Saâdane

Assistant referees:
Ali Hussein (Egypt)
Yahya El Barbari (Egypt)
Fourth official:
... ... (...)

Man of the Match:
... ... (...)
