= 1960 World Men's Military Cup =

Tournament details
- Host country: French Algeria
- City: Oran
- Dates: 15–22 May
- Teams: 4
- Venue: 1 (in 1 host city)

Final positions
- Champions: Belgium (4th title)
- Runners-up: Turkey
- Third place: Greece
- Fourth place: France

Tournament statistics
- Matches played: 6
- Goals scored: 13 (2.17 per match)

The 1960 World Men's Military Cup was the fifteenth edition of the World Military Cup, the football military championship of the world. It was hosted by Oran, French Algeria. The format of competition was a championship in the final tournament.

== Qualification ==
=== Qualification stage ===
==== Group A ====
17 December 1959

| Netherlands | 1 − 4 | France |
|---|---|---|
| De Kreek 85' (pen.) | | Heutte 15'; Deloffre 22', 62'; Courtin 64' |

Philips, Eindhoven
Attendance: 2,500
Referee: Albert Dusch (West Germany)

7 January 1960

| France | 3 − 1 | Luxembourg |

..., Mulhouse

14 January 1960

| Luxembourg | 4 − 3 | Netherlands |
|---|---|---|
| Schaack 51', 55', 75'; Fiedler 85' | | Alma 2', 30'; Loo 38' |

..., Luxembourg

7 February 1960

| France | 1 − 1 | Netherlands |
|---|---|---|
| Heutte 51' | | De Vries <45' |

Stade du Moustoir, Lorient
Attendance: 12,000

21 February 1960

| Luxembourg | 1 − 1 | France |

..., Luxembourg

3 March 1960

| Netherlands | 3 − 0 | Luxembourg |
|---|---|---|
| De Vries 35'; Theunissen 65'; Bergholz 77' |

Galgenwaard, Utrecht
Attendance: 3000
- France qualified for the final tournament

==== Group B ====
18 February 1960

| Belgium | 5 − 2 | Portugal |
|---|---|---|
| Bauweraerts 28', 41'; Wégria 32'; Jordan 39'; Janssens 46' | | Augusto 55', 70' |

Émile Versé Stadium, Brussels

28 February 1960

| Portugal | 2 − 0 | Belgium |
|---|---|---|
| Da Silva 48', 71' |

Estádio Nacional, Lisbon
- Belgium qualified for the final tournament

==== Group C ====
17 January 1960

| Turkey | 1 − 1 | United Arab Republic |
|---|---|---|
| Yelken 52' | Report | S. Salem 20' |

19 Mayıs Stadium, Ankara
Attendance: 29,681
Referee: Antonio Maraconi (Italy)

4 March 1960

| United Arab Republic | 0 − 0 (a.e.t.) | Turkey |
|---|---|---|
| | Report |

International Stadium, Cairo
Attendance: 25,000
Referee: Renato (Italy)
- The number of corner kicks in both matches are taken into account and the winner was determined as Turkey 10−7 BAC.
- Turkey qualified for the final tournament

==== Group D ====
27 January 1960

| Greece | 1 − 1 | Italy |
|---|---|---|
| Giorgos Andreou 17' | | Stacchini 21' |

..., Athens

19 March 1960

| Italy | 0 − 1 | Greece |
|---|---|---|
| | | Sideris 11' |

Stadio Mario Rigamonti, Brescia
- Greece qualified for the final tournament

=== Qualified teams ===
- Belgium
- France
- Greece
- Turkey

== Final Tournament ==
=== Venues ===
The tournament was held in Stade Henri Fouques-Duparc. With a capacity of 40 000 spectators, it was at this time the biggest stadium of the French Algeria. Now it's called Stade Ahmed Zabana.

| Oran | 1960 World Men's Military Cup is located in Algeria |
| Stade Henri Fouquès-Duparc | 1960 World Men's Military Cup is located in Algeria |
| Capacity: 40,000 | 1960 World Men's Military Cup is located in Algeria |

=== Results ===
| Team | Pld | W | D | L | GF | GA | GD | Pts |
|---|---|---|---|---|---|---|---|---|
| Belgium | 3 | 1 | 2 | 0 | 4 | 3 | +1 | 4 |
| Turkey | 3 | 1 | 1 | 1 | 1 | 1 | 0 | 3 |
| Greece | 3 | 1 | 1 | 1 | 5 | 5 | 0 | 3 |
| France | 3 | 0 | 2 | 1 | 3 | 4 | −1 | 2 |

15 May 1960

| France | 1 − 1 | Belgium |
|---|---|---|
| Cornu 66' | | Wégria 52' |

Stade Henri Fouquès-Duparc, Oran
15 May 1960

| Turkey | 1 − 0 | Greece |
|---|---|---|
| Turhan 14' |

Stade Henri Fouquès-Duparc, Oran

19 May 1960

| Belgium | 2 − 2 | Greece |
|---|---|---|
| Croté 4'; Ritzen 21' | | Dimitris Anastasiadis 63'; Dermatis 81' |

Stade Henri Fouquès-Duparc, Oran
19 May 1960

| France | 0 − 0 | Turkey |

Stade Henri Fouquès-Duparc, Oran
Referee: Daniel Zariquiegui Izco (Spain)

22 May 1960

| Greece | 3 − 2 | France |
|---|---|---|
| Loukanidis 32'; Sideris 62'; Giorgos Andreou 88' | | Ett 13'; Sauvage 75' |

Stade Henri Fouquès-Duparc, Oran
22 May 1960

| Belgium | 1 − 0 | Turkey |
|---|---|---|
| Ritzen 67' | Report |

Stade Henri Fouquès-Duparc, Oran

=== Champion ===
1960 World Military Cup winners

Belgium
Fourth title
