= 1989 FIFA Futsal World Championship squads =

This article lists the confirmed national futsal squads for the 1989 FIFA Futsal World Championship tournament held in Netherlands, between 5 and 15 January, 1989.

== Group A ==
=== Netherlands ===
Head coach: Ron Groenewoud

No.	Pos.	Player	Date of birth (age)	Caps	Goals	Club
1	GK	Ton Bakhuis	5 June 1953 (aged 35)			(Netherlands) FV Snoekie
2		Jeffrey Foree	17 February 1963 (aged 25)			
3		Andre Tielens	15 March 1963 (aged 25)			
4		Victor Hermans	17 March 1953 (aged 35)			
5		Marcel Loosveld	4 January 1963 (aged 26)			
6		Rein van der Heuvel	14 February 1961 (aged 27)			(Netherlands) Vitesse Arnhem
7		Wiljan van Vijfeijken	15 May 1959 (aged 29)			(Netherlands) Bunga Melati
8		Mario Faber	8 August 1959 (aged 29)			
9		Eduard Demandt	22 June 1960 (aged 28)			
10		Hans van Leeuwen	24 February 1960 (aged 28)			
11		Andre Bakker	6 February 1961 (aged 27)			
12		Michel Seintner	8 September 1965 (aged 23)			(Netherlands) Bunga Melati
13	GK	Michel Wentzel	28 June 1966 (aged 22)			(Netherlands) Bunga Melati

=== Denmark ===
Head coach: Richard Møller Nielsen

No.	Pos.	Player	Date of birth (age)	Caps	Goals	Club
1	GK	Jan Rindom				
2		Torben Johansen				
3		Lars Olsen				
4		Jacob Svinggaard				
5		Peter Bonde				
6		Ole Møller Nielsen				
7		Jan Vingaard				
8		Sigurd Kristensen				
9		Brian Laudrup				
10		Bent Christensen				
11		Kurt Jørgensen				
13	GK	Erik Jensen				

=== Paraguay ===
Head coach: Lourenco Garcia

No.	Pos.	Player	Date of birth (age)	Caps	Goals	Club
1	GK	Pablo Benítez				
2	GK	Adolfo Jara				
3		Luis Jara				
4		Juan Peralta				
5		Mario Ruiz-Díaz				
6		Víctor López				
7		Miguel Martínez				
8		José Sánchez				
9		Luis Flor				
10		Omar Espineda				
11		Francisco Alcaraz				
12		Francisco Ibarrola				
13		Francisco Solano				

=== Algeria ===
Head coach: Amar Rouaï

No.	Pos.	Player	Date of birth (age)	Caps	Goals	Club
1	GK	Benbella Benmiloud	1 January 1958 (aged 31)			(Morocco) FUS Rabat
2		Ali Benhalima	21 January 1962 (aged 26)			(Algeria) Mouloudia d'Oran
3		Cherif Guettai	16 January 1961 (aged 27)			(Algeria) Université d'Annaba
4		Samir Belamri	17 August 1959 (aged 29)			(Algeria) Union d'Aïn Béïda
5		Abderrahmane Dahnoune	24 January 1962 (aged 26)			(Algeria) Union d'Alger
6		Amirouche Lalili	29 February 1964 (aged 24)			(Algeria) Union d'Alger
7		Mohamed Bouhdjar	21 November 1958 (aged 30)			(Algeria) US Bel Abbès
8		Mustapha Boukar	2 November 1962 (aged 26)			(Algeria) Association d'Oran
9		Khaled Lounici	9 July 1967 (aged 21)			(Algeria) Union d'El Harrach
10		Lakhdar Belloumi	29 December 1958 (aged 30)			(Algeria) Mouloudia d'Oran
11		Abdelhafid Tasfaout	11 February 1969 (aged 19)			(Algeria) Association d'Oran
12		Mohamed Benchiha	30 October 1961 (aged 27)			
13	GK	Abdesslam Benabdellah	12 January 1964 (aged 24)			(Algeria) US Bel Abbès

== Group B ==
=== Hungary ===
Head coach: József Tajti

No.	Pos.	Player	Date of birth (age)	Caps	Goals	Club
1	GK	Károly Gelei				
2		Sándor Olajos				
3		László Zsadányi				
4		László Quirikó				
5		Mihály Borostyán				
6		László Kósa				
7		Attila Gyimesi				
8		András Csepregi				
9		János Mózner				
10		László Rózsa				
11		Zsolt Túri				
12		György Freppán				
13	GK	István Brockhauser				

=== Brazil ===
Head coach: Gerson Tristão

No.	Pos.	Player	Date of birth (age)	Club
1	GK	Lula	30 July 1964 (aged 24)	
2	DF	Cadinho	26 April 1963 (aged 25)	
3	MF	Dirceu	24 April 1960 (aged 28)	
4	MF	Gilson	21 July 1961 (aged 27)	
5	MF	Marquinhos	27 December 1965 (aged 23)	
6	MF	Sérgio Benatti	7 November 1965 (aged 23)	
7	MF	Átila	24 July 1961 (aged 27)	
8	DF	Raul	30 January 1958 (aged 30)	
9	FW	Toca	15 May 1964 (aged 24)	
10	FW	Carlos Alberto	17 June 1961 (aged 27)	
11	MF	Neimar	18 March 1964 (aged 24)	
12	GK	Serginho Coelho	23 March 1965 (aged 23)	
13	FW	Adílio	15 May 1956 (aged 32)	(Ecuador) Barcelona de Guayaquil

=== Saudi Arabia ===
Head coach: Muhammad Al Kahrashi

No.	Pos.	Player	Date of birth (age)	Caps	Goals	Club
1	GK	Musa Bedewi				
2		Mostafa Belai				
3		Mahdi Al-Ragdi				
4		Khaled Al-Behair				
5		Ramzi Al-Osaimi				
6		Abdullah Abu Humoud				
7		Mousa Al-Harbi				
8		Khaled Al-Nafisah				
9		Safouk Al-Temyat				
13		Abdul Al-Owais				

=== Spain ===
Head coach: Teodoro Nieto

No.	Pos.	Player	Date of birth (age)	Caps	Goals	Club
1	GK	Prudencio Molina				
2		Juan Simón				
3		Sergio Bonilla				
4		Antonio Ferre				
5		Carlos Navarro				
6		Daniel Armora				
7		Santiago Valladares				
8		Mario González				
9		Rafael Durán				
10		José Iglesias				
11		Eduardo Sánchez				
12		Domingo Valencia				
13		Rafael Torres				

== Group C ==
=== Japan ===
Head coach: Masakatsu Miyamoto

No.	Pos.	Player	Date of birth (age)	Caps	Goals	Club
1	GK	Masataka Ishii				
2	GK	Nobuhiro Takeda				
3		Mikiya Kanzaki				
4		Toshinobu Katsuya				
5		Kunio Kitamura				
6		Yasuharu Kurata				
7		Sugao Kambe				
8		Toshinori Yato				
9		Satoru Noda				
10		Shigemitsu Egawa				
11		Shigeru Ando				
12		Tsuyoshi Kitazawa				
13		Seiichi Nigishi				

=== Belgium ===
Head coach: Claudy Blaise

No.	Pos.	Player	Date of birth (age)	Caps	Goals	Club
1	GK	Joan Lamotte				
2		Alain Fostier				
3		Jacobus Dreesen				
4		Jos Schoubs				
5		Karel Janssen				
6		Nico Papanicolau				
7		Herman Beyers				
8		Luc Reul				
9		Raf Hernalsteen				
10		Rudi Schreurs				
11		Frank Luypaert				
12		Eric Maes				
13	GK	Philippe Marche				

=== Canada ===
Head coach: Bob Lenarduzzi

No.	Pos.	Player	Date of birth (age)	Caps	Goals	Club
1	GK	Paul Dolan				
2		Peter Sarantopoulos				
3		Nick De Santis				
4		Lyndon Hooper				
5		Tony Nocita				
6		Stan Siorovigas				
7		Eddy Berdusco				
8		Norm Odinga				
9		Alex Bunbury				
10		Lucio Ianiero				
11		Doug Muirhead				
12	GK	Pat Harrington				
13		John Fitzgerald				

=== Argentina ===
Head coach: Vicente de Luise

No.	Pos.	Player	Date of birth (age)	Caps	Goals	Club
1	GK	Adolfo FAGUNDEZ				
2		Luis LOPEZ				
3		German OCAMPO				
4		Eduardo SANTAMARIA				
5		Fernando LOZANO				
6		Gabriel VALARIN				
7		Rodolfo TIN				
8		Hugo CASTANEIRA				
9		Ramon ALVAREZ				
10		Nicolas HIDALGO				
11		Juan AVALOS				
12	GK	Alberto CARFAGNA				

== Group D ==
=== Italy ===
Head coach: Enzo Trombetta

No.	Pos.	Player	Date of birth (age)	Caps	Goals	Club
1	GK	Luca Bergamini				
2		Paolo Minicucci				
3		Mario Morosini				
4		Gianni Faiola				
5		Franco Albanesi				
6		Massimo Famà				
7		Paolo De Simoni				
8		Alfredo Filippini				
9		Vito Cucco				
10		Raoul Albani				
11		Giovanni Roma				
12	GK	Wolfranco Crescenzi				
13		Alessandro Pomposelli				

=== Zimbabwe ===
Head coach: Nico Sprey

No.	Pos.	Player	Date of birth (age)	Caps	Goals	Club
1	GK	Peter Nkomo				
2		David Mwanza				
3		Clayton Munemo				
4		Garikai Zuze				
5		Antony Kambani				
6		Masimba Dinyero				
7		Ronnie Jowa				
8		Joseph Machingura				
9		Henry Charles				
10		Benjamin Zulu				
11		Danny Kamuchira				
12		Reason Dawa				
13	GK	Brennen Msiska				

=== United States ===
Head coach: John Kowalski

No.	Pos.	Player	Date of birth (age)	Caps	Goals	Club
1	GK	David Vanole				
2		Steve Trittschuh				
3		Eric Eichmann				
4		Doc Lawson				
5		Mike Windischmann				
6		Tab Ramos				
7		Jim Gabarra				
8		Gyula Visnyei				
9		Brent Goulet				
10		Peter Vermes				
11		Peter Smith				
12		Bruce Murray				
13	GK	A.J. Lachowecki				

=== Australia ===
Head coach: Tim White

No.	Pos.	Player	Date of birth (age)	Caps	Goals	Club
1	GK	Jeff Olver				
2		Alan Davidson				
3		Steven Jackson				
4		Robbie Hooker				
5		Oscar Crino				
6		Paul Trimboli				
7		Robbie Dunn				
8		Jason Polak				
9		Warren Spink				
10		Kenneth Murphy				
11		Žarko Odžakov				
12		Ernie Tapai				
