= 1989 African Cup of Champions Clubs =

Tournament details
- Dates: 1989
- Teams: 38 (from 37 associations)

Final positions
- Champions: (Morocco) Raja CA (1st title)
- Runners-up: (Algeria) MC Oran

Tournament statistics
- Matches played: 69
- Goals scored: 153 (2.22 per match)
- Top scorer(s): (Algeria) Mourad Meziane (5 goals)

The 1989 African Cup of Champions Clubs was the 25th edition of the annual international club football competition held in the CAF region (Africa), the African Cup of Champions Clubs. It determined the 1989 club champion of association football in Africa.

Raja CA from Morocco won that final, against MC Oran from Algeria, and became CAF club champion for the first time.

== Preliminary round ==
Team 1	Agg.	Team 2	1st leg	2nd leg
CD Elá Nguema (Equatorial Guinea)	1–4	(Central African Republic) ASDR Fatima	1–0	0–4
Mbabane Highlanders (Eswatini)	4–0	(Tanzania) African Sports	2–0	w/o^{1}
Matlama FC (Lesotho)	1–5	(Botswana) Defence Force XI	0–1	1-4
Mighty Blackpool (Sierra Leone)	w/o^{2}	(Guinea-Bissau) Benfica de Bissau	—	—
Saint-Louis FC (Seychelles)	1–0	(Madagascar) COSFAP Antananarivo	0–0	1–0
Zumunta AC (Niger)	1–3	(Burkina Faso) EF Ouagadougou	0–2	1–1

^{1}: African Sports withdrew after first leg.
^{2}: Benfica de Bissau withdrew.

== First round ==
Team 1	Agg.	Team 2	1st leg	2nd leg
AFC Leopards (Kenya)	1–1 (a)	(Burundi) AS Inter Star	0–0	1–1
Desportivo Maputo (Mozambique)	3–3 (a)	Zimbabwe Saints FC	2–2	1–1
Djoliba AC (Mali)	1–0	(Guinea) Horoya AC	1–0	0–0
Entente de Sétif (Algeria)	1–1 (3–5 p)	(Sierra Leone) Mighty Blackpool	1–0	0–1
Espérance de Tunis (Tunisia)	2–1	(Burkina Faso) EF Ouagadougou	2–1	0–0
Express FC (Uganda)	5–2	(Eswatini) Mbabane Highlanders	4–0	1–2
Fire Brigade SC (Mauritius)	2–0	(Seychelles) Saint-Louis FC	1–0	1–0
Inter Club Brazzaville (Republic of the Congo)	4–3	(Angola) Petro Atlético	2–1	2–2
Iwuanyanwu Nationale (Nigeria)	4–1	(Liberia) Mighty Barrolle	4–1	0–0
JAC Port-Gentil (Gabon)	1–1 (5–3 p)	(Ivory Coast) Africa Sports	1–0	0–1
Mouloudia d'Oran (Note: Mouloudia d'Oran was the name of MC Oran (Mouloudia Club d'Oran) between 1987-88 and 1988-89 seasons, so in September 1989 the club started the quarter-finals under its historical name, MC Oran.) (Algeria)	w/o^{1}	(Libya) Al-Ittihad Tripoli	—	—
Nkana Red Devils (Zambia)	5–2	(Botswana) Defence Force XI	4–1	1–1
Raja CA (Morocco)	2–1	(Senegal) ASC Jeanne d'Arc	2–0	0–1
Tonnerre Yaoundé (Cameroon)	5–0	(Central African Republic) ASDR Fatima	2–0	3–0
AS Vita Club (Zaire)	6–1	(Rwanda) Mukungwa FC	4–0	2–1
Zamalek (Egypt)	2–2 (a)	(Sudan) Al-Mourada	2–1	0–1

^{1}: Al-Ittihad Tripoli withdrew before the 1st leg.

... March 1989

AFC Leopards (Kenya)	0 – 0	(Burundi) AS Inter Star

..., Nairobi
... April 1989

AS Inter Star (Burundi)	1 – 1	(Kenya) AFC Leopards
Goal		Goal

..., Bujumbura

AFC Leopards won on away goals after 1–1 on aggregate.

... March 1989

Desportivo Maputo (Mozambique)	2 – 2	Zimbabwe Saints
Goal		Goal

..., Maputo
... April 1989

Zimbabwe Saints	1 – 1	(Mozambique) Desportivo Maputo
Goal		Goal

..., Bulawayo

Zimbabwe Saints won on away goals after 3–3 on aggregate.

... March 1989

Djoliba AC (Mali)	1 – 0	(Guinea) Horoya AC
Goal

..., Bamako
... April 1989

Horoya AC (Guinea)	0 – 0	(Mali) Djoliba AC

..., Conakry

Djoliba AC won 1–0 on aggregate.

... May 1989

Entente de Sétif (Algeria)	1 – 0	(Sierra Leone) Mighty Blackpool
Goal

Stade 8 Mai 1945, Sétif
... May 1989

Mighty Blackpool (Sierra Leone)	1 – 0	(Algeria) Entente de Sétif
Goal
Penalties
	5 – 3

..., Freetown

Mighty Blackpool won 5–3 on penalties after 1–1 on aggregate.

... March 1989

Espérance de Tunis (Tunisia)	2 – 1	(Burkina Faso) Étoile Filante
Goal		Goal

Stade El Menzah, Tunis
... April 1989

Étoile Filante (Burkina Faso)	0 – 0	(Tunisia) Espérance de Tunis

Stade du 4 Août, Ouagadougou

ES Tunis won 2–1 on aggregate.

... March 1989

Express FC (Uganda)	4 – 0	(Eswatini) Mbabane Highlanders
Goal

..., Kampala
... April 1989

Mbabane Highlanders (Eswatini)	2 – 1	(Uganda) Express FC
Goal		Goal

..., Mbabane

Express FC won 5–2 on aggregate.

... March 1989

Fire Brigade SC (Mauritius)	1 – 0	(Seychelles) Saint-Louis FC
Goal

..., Beau Bassin-Rose Hill
... April 1989

Saint-Louis FC (Seychelles)	0 – 1	(Mauritius) Fire Brigade SC
		Goal

..., Victoria

Fire Brigade SC won 2–0 on aggregate.

... March 1989

Inter Club Brazzaville (Republic of the Congo)	2 – 1	(Angola) Petro Atlético
Goal		Goal

Stade de la Revolution, Brazzaville
... April 1989

Petro Atlético (Angola)	2 – 2	(Republic of the Congo) Inter Club Brazzaville
Goal		Goal

Estádio da Cidadela, Victoria

Inter Club Brazzaville won 4–3 on aggregate.

... March 1989

Iwuanyanwu Nationale (Nigeria)	4 – 1	(Liberia) Mighty Barrolle
Goal		Goal

Dan Anyiam Stadium, Owerri
... April 1989

Mighty Barrolle (Liberia)	0 – 0	(Nigeria) Iwuanyanwu Nationale

..., Buchanan

Iwuanyanwu Nationale won 4–1 on aggregate.

... May 1989

JAC Port-Gentil (Gabon)	1 – 0	(Ivory Coast) Africa Sports
Goal

..., Port-Gentil
... May 1989

Africa Sports (Ivory Coast)	1 – 0	(Gabon) JAC Port-Gentil
Goal
Penalties
	5 – 3

..., Abidjan

JAC Port-Gentil won 5–3 on penalties after 1–1 on aggregate.

... March 1989

Mouloudia d'Oran (Algeria)	Cancelled	(Libya) Al-Ittihad

Stade Habib Bouakeul, Oran
... April 1989

Al-Ittihad (Libya)	Cancelled	(Algeria) Mouloudia d'Oran

11 June Stadium, Tripoli

Mouloudia d'Oran won after Al-Ittihad withdrew.

... March 1989

Nkana Red Devils (Zambia)	4 – 1	(Botswana) Defence Force XI
Goal		Goal

Scriveners Stadium, Kitwe
... April 1989

Defence Force XI (Botswana)	1 – 1	(Zambia) Nkana Red Devils
Goal		Goal

..., Mogoditshane

Nkana Red Devils won 5–2 on aggregate.

19 March 1989

Raja CA (Morocco)	2 – 0	(Senegal) ASC Jeanne d'Arc
Ould Mou 46'; Jamal 90'

Stade Mohamed V, Casablanca
2 April 1989

ASC Jeanne d'Arc (Senegal)	1 – 0	(Morocco) Raja CA
40' (pen.)

Stade de l'Amitié, Dakar

Raja won 2–1 on aggregate.

... March 1989

Tonnerre Yaoundé (Cameroon)	2 – 0	(Central African Republic) ASDR Fatima
Goal

Stade Ahmadou Ahidjo, Yaoundé
... April 1989

ASDR Fatima (Central African Republic)	0 – 3	(Cameroon) Tonnerre Yaoundé
		Goal

..., Bangui

Tonnerre Yaoundé won 5–0 on aggregate.

... March 1989

AS Vita Club (Zaire)	4 – 0	(Rwanda) Mukungwa FC
Goal

Stade du 20 Mai, Kinshasa
... April 1989

Mukungwa FC (Rwanda)	1 – 2	(Zaire) AS Vita Club
Goal		Goal

..., Kigali

AS Vita Club won 6–1 on aggregate.

... March 1989

Zamalek SC (Egypt)	2 – 1	(Sudan) Al-Mourada SC
Abdel-Hamid 57'; Mahmoud 89'		Breish 12'

Cairo International Stadium, Cairo
Referee: Messaoud Koussa (Algeria)
... April 1989

Al-Mourada SC (Sudan)	1 – 0	(Egypt) Zamalek SC
Goal

Al-Mourada Stadium, Omdurman

Al-Mourada SC won on away goals after 2–2 on aggregate.

== Second round ==
Team 1	Agg.	Team 2	1st leg	2nd leg
AFC Leopards (Kenya)	1–3	(Sudan) Al-Mourada	1–0	0–3
Iwuanyanwu Nationale FC (Nigeria)	3–3 (4–5 p)	(Republic of the Congo) Inter Club Brazzaville	2–1	1–2
Espérance de Tunis (Tunisia)	4–5	(Algeria) Mouloudia d'Oran	3–2	1–3
Mighty Blackpool (Sierra Leone)	2–1	(Mali) Djoliba AC	2–1	0–0
Nkana Red Devils (Zambia)	8–3	(Mauritius) Fire Brigade SC	5–1	3–2
Raja CA (Morocco)	1–1 (a)	(Gabon) JAC Port-Gentil	0–0	1–1
AS Vita Club (Zaire)	2–4	(Cameroon) Tonnerre Yaoundé	1–1	1–3
Zimbabwe Saints FC	1–1 (4–3 p)	(Uganda) Express FC	0–1	1–0

... May 1989

AFC Leopards (Kenya)	1 – 0	(Sudan) Al-Mourada SC
Goal

..., Nairobi
... May 1989

Al-Mourada SC (Sudan)	3 – 0	(Kenya) AFC Leopards
Goal

Al-Mourada Stadium, Omdurman

Al-Mourada SC won 3–1 on aggregate.

... May 1989

Iwuanyanwu Nationale FC (Nigeria)	2 – 1	(Republic of the Congo) Inter Club Brazzaville
Goal		Goal

Dan Anyiam Stadium, Owerri
... May 1989

Inter Club Brazzaville (Republic of the Congo)	2 – 1	(Nigeria) Iwuanyanwu Nationale FC
Goal		Goal
Penalties
	5 – 4

Stade de la Revolution, Brazzaville

Inter Club Brazzaville won 5–4 on penalties after 3–3 on aggregate.

13 May 1989

Espérance de Tunis (Tunisia)	3 – 2	(Algeria) Mouloudia d'Oran
Tlemçani 46'; Ben Mahmoud 60' (pen.); Abid 86'		Bott 16'; Maroc 52'

Stade El Menzah, Tunis
Attendance: 40,000
Referee: Modibo N'Diaye (Mali)
26 May 1989

Mouloudia d'Oran (Algeria)	3 – 1	(Tunisia) Espérance de Tunis
Mecheri 7'; Meziane 15', 55'		Chaâbane 83'

Stade Habib Bouakeul, Oran
Attendance: 20,000
Referee: Larbi El Abbasi (Morocco)

MC Oran won 5–4 on aggregate.

... May 1989

Mighty Blackpool (Sierra Leone)	2 – 1	(Mali) Djoliba AC
Goal		Goal

..., Freetown
... May 1989

Djoliba AC (Mali)	0 – 0	(Sierra Leone) Mighty Blackpool

..., Bamako

Mighty Blackpool won 2–1 on aggregate.

... May 1989

Nkana Red Devils (Zambia)	5 – 1	(Mauritius) Fire Brigade SC
Goal		Goal

Scriveners Stadium, Kitwe
... May 1989

Fire Brigade SC (Mauritius)	2 – 3	(Zambia) Nkana Red Devils
Goal		Goal

..., Beau Bassin-Rose Hill

Nkana Red Devils won 8–3 on aggregate.

14 May 1989

Raja CA (Morocco)	0 – 0	(Gabon) JAC Port-Gentil

Stade Mohamed V, Casablanca
28 May 1989

JAC Port-Gentil (Gabon)	1 – 1	(Morocco) Raja CA
Goal		Seddiki

..., Port-Gentil

Raja won on away goals after 1–1 on aggregate.

... May 1989

AS Vita Club (Zaire)	1 – 1	(Cameroon) Tonnerre Yaoundé
Goal		Goal

Stade du 20 Mai, Kinshasa
... May 1989

Tonnerre Yaoundé (Cameroon)	3 – 1	(Zaire) AS Vita Club
Goal		Goal

Stade Ahmadou Ahidjo, Yaoundé

Tonnerre Yaoundé won 4–2 on aggregate.

... May 1989

Zimbabwe Saints	0 – 1	(Uganda) Express FC

..., Bulawayo
... May 1989

Express FC (Uganda)	0 – 1	Zimbabwe Saints
Goal		Goal
Penalties
	3 – 4

..., Kampala

Zimbabwe Saints won 4–3 on penalties after 1–1 on aggregate.

== Quarter-finals ==
Team 1	Agg.	Team 2	1st leg	2nd leg
Al-Mourada (Sudan)	1–4	(Algeria) MC Oran	1–0	0–4
Mighty Blackpool (Sierra Leone)	1–4	(Cameroon) Tonnerre Yaoundé	0–1	1–3
Raja CA (Morocco)	2–1	(Republic of the Congo) Inter Club Brazzaville	2–0	0–1
Zimbabwe Saints FC	1–2	(Zambia) Nkana Red Devils	0–0	1–2

8 September 1989

Al-Mourada (Sudan)	1 – 0	(Algeria) MC Oran
Breish 30'

Al-Mourada Stadium, Omdurman
Attendance: 15,000
22 September 1989

MC Oran (Algeria)	4 – 0	(Sudan) Al-Mourada
Belloumi 21'; Mecheri 39'; Benhalima 80'; Meziane 88'

Stade Habib Bouakeul, Oran
Attendance: 10,000
Referee: Karim Camara (Guinea)

MC Oran won 4–1 on aggregate.

... September 1989

Mighty Blackpool (Sierra Leone)	0 – 1	(Cameroon) Tonnerre Yaoundé
		Goal

..., Freetown
... September 1989

Tonnerre Yaoundé (Cameroon)	3 – 1	(Sierra Leone) Mighty Blackpool
Goal		Goal

Stade Ahmadou Ahidjo, Yaoundé

Tonnerre Yaoundé won 4–1 on aggregate.

9 September 1989

Raja CA (Morocco)	2 – 0	(Republic of the Congo) Inter Club Brazzaville
Seddiki (pen.); Ould Mou

Stade Mohamed V, Casablanca
24 September 1989

Inter Club Brazzaville (Republic of the Congo)	1 – 0	(Morocco) Raja CA

Stade de la Revolution, Brazzaville

Raja won 2–1 on aggregate.

... September 1989

Zimbabwe Saints	0 – 0	(Zambia) Nkana Red Devils

..., Bulawayo
... September 1989

Nkana Red Devils (Zambia)	2 – 1	Zimbabwe Saints
Goal		Goal

Scriveners Stadium, Kitwe

Nkana Red Devils won 2–1 on aggregate.

== Semi-finals ==
Team 1	Agg.	Team 2	1st leg	2nd leg
Nkana Red Devils (Zambia)	3–5	(Algeria) MC Oran	1–0	2–5
Raja CA (Morocco)	4–2	(Cameroon) Tonnerre Yaoundé	2–0	2–2

22 October 1989

Nkana Red Devils (Zambia)	1 – 0	(Algeria) MC Oran
K. Malitoli 22'

Scriveners Stadium, Kitwe
Attendance: 10,000
5 November 1989

MC Oran (Algeria)	5 – 2	(Zambia) Nkana Red Devils
Foussi 17', 20'; Sebbah 49'; Meziane 55', 87'		Chambeshi 11', 69'

Stade Habib Bouakeul, Oran
Attendance: 20,000

MC Oran won 5–3 on aggregate.

20 October 1989

Raja CA (Morocco)	2 – 0	(Cameroon) Tonnerre Yaoundé
Ould Mou

Stade Mohamed V, Casablanca
5 November 1989

Tonnerre Yaoundé (Cameroon)	2 – 2	(Morocco) Raja CA
unknown		Diagne

Stade Ahmadou Ahidjo, Yaoundé

Raja won 4–2 on aggregate.

== Final ==
3 December 1989
17:00 UTC+0

Raja CA (Morocco)	1–0	(Algeria) MC Oran
Diagne 50'

Stade Mohamed V, Casablanca
Attendance: 50,000
Referee: Badara Sène (Senegal)
15 December 1989
16:00 UTC+1

MC Oran (Algeria)	1–0	(Morocco) Raja CA
Sebbah 43' (pen.)
Penalties
Sebbah (penalty scored); Benhalima (penalty missed); Maroc (penalty scored); Bott (penalty missed)	2–4	(penalty scored) Diagne; (penalty scored) Khalif; (penalty scored) Kadmiri; (penalty scored) Madih

Stade du 19 Juin, Oran
Attendance: 45,000
Referee: Mohamed Hafez (Egypt)

== Champion ==
1989 African Cup of Champions Clubs winners
(Morocco)
Raja CA
First title

== Top scorers ==
The top scorers from the 1989 African Cup of Champions Clubs are as follows:

Rank	Name	Team	Goals
1	(Algeria) Mourad Meziane	(Algeria) MC Oran	5
2	(Morocco) Bouazza Ould Mou	(Morocco) Raja CA	4
3	(Senegal) Salif Diagne	(Morocco) Raja CA	3
4	(Algeria) Tayeb Foussi	(Algeria) MC Oran	2
4	(Algeria) Bachir Mecheri	(Algeria) MC Oran	2
4	(Algeria) Benyagoub Sebbah	(Algeria) MC Oran	2
4	(Angola) Mona	(Angola) Petro Atlético	2
4	(Morocco) Said Seddiki	(Morocco) Raja CA	2
4	(Zambia) Beston Chambeshi	(Zambia) Nkana Red Devils	2
