= 1983 Algerian Cup final =

- Stade du 5 Juillet hosted the match
- Event: 1982–83 Algerian Cup
MP Alger	ASC Oran
4	3
- Date: May 20, 1983
- Venue: Stade du 5 Juillet, Algiers
- Man of the Match: Abdeslam Bousri
- Referee: Amar Ghotari
- Attendance: 43,120

The 1983 Algerian Cup final was the 21st final of the Algerian Cup. The final took place on May 20, 1983, at Stade 5 Juillet 1962 in Algiers with kick-off at 19:00. MP Alger beat ASC Oran 4-3 after extra time to win their fourth Algerian Cup.

== Pre-match ==
=== Details ===
May 20, 1983
16:00

MP Alger	4–3 (a.e.t)	ASC Oran
Bousri 16', 46'; Bencheikh 58'; Bellemou 111'	Report (in French)	10', 87' Lefdjah; 56' (pen.) Tasfaout

Stade du 5 Juillet, Algiers
Attendance: 43,120
Referee: Amar Ghotari

MC Alger	ASC Oran

GK	1	(Algeria) Mohamed Ait Mouhoub
DF	2	(Algeria) Abdelmajid Oudina
DF	5	(Algeria) Abdelwahab Zenir (c)
DF	4	(Algeria) Bouzid Mahyouz
DF	3	(Algeria) Nacereddine Laroussi
MF	8	(Algeria) Mohamed Rabah Ghrib	(substituted off) 72'
MF	6	(Algeria) Ali Bencheikh
FW	9	(Algeria) Abdeslam Bousri
FW	10	(Algeria) Nasser Bouiche
FW	11	(Algeria) Noreddine Meghichi
MF	7	(Algeria) Abdenour Bellemou
Substitutes :
DF	12	(Algeria) Youcef Farhi	(substituted in) 72'
Manager :
(Algeria) Abdennour Kaoua

GK	1	(Algeria) Saïd Emtir
DF	3	(Algeria) Lakhdar Benarmas
DF	2	(Algeria) Belkacem Guemri
DF	5	(Algeria) Mohamed Belkheïra
MF	6	(Algeria) Bouziane Taïbi		(yellow card) 26' (red card) 52'
FW	9	(Algeria) Hamid Lefdjah
MF	10	(Algeria) Mustapha Boukar
MF	8	(Algeria) Ahmed Tasfaout	(substituted off) 71'
MF	11	(Algeria) Bouabdallah Belhadj	Substituted off
DF	4	(Algeria) Touhami Benouedene (c)
FW	7	(Algeria) Redouane Guemri
Substitutes :
MF	13	(Algeria) Houari Belkhetouat	(substituted in) 71'
DF	12	(Algeria) Ali Benhalima	Substituted in
Manager :
(Algeria) Kaddour Bekhloufi

MATCH OFFICIALS

- Assistant referees:
  - Rachid Medjiba
  - Othmane
- Fourth official:

MAN OF THE MATCH

- (Algeria) Abdeslam Bousri (MC Alger)

MATCH RULES

- 90 minutes.
- 30 minutes of extra-time if necessary.
- Penalty shootout if scores still level.
- Seven named substitutes.
- Maximum of three substitutions.
