= 1991 African Cup of Champions Clubs =

Tournament details
- Dates: 1991
- Teams: 38 (from 38 associations)

Final positions
- Champions: (Tunisia) Club Africain (1st title)
- Runners-up: (Uganda) SC Villa

Tournament statistics
- Matches played: 69
- Goals scored: 178 (2.58 per match)

The 1991 African Cup of Champions Clubs was the 27th edition of the annual international club football competition held in the CAF region (Africa), the African Cup of Champions Clubs. It determined that year's club champion of association football in Africa.

Club Africain from Tunisia won that final, and became for the first time CAF club champion.

== Preliminary round ==
Team 1	Agg.	Team 2	1st leg	2nd leg
ASF Fianarantsoa (Madagascar)	4–1	(Seychelles) Saint-Louis FC	4–1	0–0
Brewery (Ethiopia)	w/o^{1}	(Somalia) Jadidka	–	–
Denver Sundowns (Eswatini)	1–1 (4–2 p)	(Botswana) Gaborone United	0–1	1–0
Ifodje Atakpamé (Togo)	1–3	(Niger) Sahel SC	0–0	1–3
Lesotho Defence Force FC	0–3	(Tanzania) Pamba SC	0–3	0–0
AS Tempête Mocaf (Central African Republic)	2–8	(Angola) Petro Atlético	2–4	0–4

^{1} Jadidka withdrew.

== First round ==
Team 1	Agg.	Team 2	1st leg	2nd leg
Al Ahly (Egypt)	w/o^{1}	(Ethiopia) Brewery	–	–
Al-Ittihad (Libya)	0–2	(Ivory Coast) ASEC Mimosas	0–2	0–0
Al-Merrikh (Sudan)	1–1 (7–8 p)	(Uganda) SC Villa	1–0	0–1
Club Africain (Tunisia)	7–2	(Benin) Requins de l'Atlantique FC	5–1	2–1
FC Lupopo (Zaire)	1–1 (a)	(Gabon) JAC Port-Gentil	1–1	0–0
Gor Mahia (Kenya)	1–4	(Zimbabwe) Highlanders FC	1–0	0–4
Hearts of Oak (Ghana)	5–5 (a)	(Angola) Petro Atlético	4–2	1–3
Inter Club (Republic of the Congo)	2–2 (a)	(Burundi) Vital'O FC	2–1	0–1
Iwuanyanwu Nationale (Nigeria)	3–2	(Sierra Leone) Old Edwardians	3–0	0–2
JS Kabylie (Algeria)	6–1	(Chad) Elect-Sport	6–0	0–1
CD Matchedje (Mozambique)	1–2	(Tanzania) Pamba SC	1–1	0–1
Nkana Red Devils (Zambia)	6–0	(Madagascar) ASF Fianarantsoa	6–0	w/o^{2}
ASC Port Autonome (Senegal)	0–1	(Mali) Djoliba AC	0–0	0–1
Sahel SC (Niger)	1–3	(Morocco) Wydad AC	0–0	1–3
Sunrise Flacq United (Mauritius)	7–2	(Eswatini) Denver Sundowns	6–0	1–2
Union Douala (Cameroon)	5–1	(Burkina Faso) EF Ouagadougou	3–0	2–1

^{1} Brewery withdrew.
^{2} ASF Fianarantsoa withdrew after 1st leg.

== Second round ==
Team 1	Agg.	Team 2	1st leg	2nd leg
Al Ahly (Egypt)	4–1	(Zimbabwe) Highlanders FC	3–1	1–0
Club Africain (Tunisia)	2–0	(Mali) Djoliba AC	2–0	0–0
Iwuanyanwu Nationale (Nigeria)	7–1	(Gabon) JAC Port-Gentil	5–0	2–1
JS Kabylie (Algeria)	1–3	(Morocco) Wydad AC	1–0	0–3
SC Villa (Uganda)	5–3	(Tanzania) Pamba SC	4–1	1–2
Nkana Red Devils (Zambia)	4–3	(Mauritius) Sunrise Flacq United	4-1	0–2
Petro Atlético (Angola)	1–1 (1–3 p)	(Ivory Coast) ASEC Mimosas	1–0	0–1
Union Douala (Cameroon)	2–0	(Burundi) Vital'O FC	2–0	0–0

== Quarter-finals ==
Team 1	Agg.	Team 2	1st leg	2nd leg
Al Ahly (Egypt)	2–2 (2–4 p)	(Uganda) SC Villa	2–0	0–2
Club Africain (Tunisia)	2–1	(Morocco) Wydad AC	2–0	0–1
Iwuanyanwu Nationale (Nigeria)	3–3 (6–5 p)	(Ivory Coast) ASEC Mimosas	3–0	0–3
Union Douala (Cameroon)	2–2 (a)	(Zambia) Nkana Red Devils	2–1	0–1

== Semi-finals ==
Team 1	Agg.	Team 2	1st leg	2nd leg
Club Africain (Tunisia)	(a) 4–4	(Zambia) Nkana Red Devils	3–0	1–4
SC Villa (Uganda)	4–3	(Nigeria) Iwuanyanwu Nationale	3–2	1–1

== Final ==
23 November 1991
--:-- UTC+1

Club Africain (Tunisia)	6–2	(Uganda) SC Villa
Mhaissi 30', 49'; Touati 44'; Sellimi 57'; Rouissi 79', 84' (pen.)		Kato 33'; Musisi 81'

Stade El Menzah, Tunis
Attendance: 40,000
Referee: Hounake Kouassi (Togo)
14 December 1991
--:-- UTC+3

SC Villa (Uganda)	1–1	(Tunisia) Club Africain
Butambuze 71'		Touati 51'

Nakivubo Stadium, Kampala
Attendance: 25,000
Referee: Badara Sène (Senegal)

== Champion ==
1991 African Cup of Champions Clubs Winners
(Tunisia)
Club Africain
first title

== Top scorers ==
The top scorers from the 1991 African Cup of Champions Clubs are as follows:

Rank	Name	Team	Goals
1	(Tunisia) Faouzi Rouissi	(Tunisia) Club Africain	6
1	(Tunisia) Adel Sellimi	(Tunisia) Club Africain	6
3	(Angola) Ndunguidi	(Angola) Petro Atlético	5
3	(Tunisia) Mohamed Hedi Abdelhak	(Tunisia) Club Africain	5
3	(Uganda) Majid Musisi	(Uganda) SC Villa	5
6	(Angola) Mona	(Angola) Petro Atlético	3
6	(Angola) Paulito	(Angola) Petro Atlético	3
6	(Senegal) Moussa N'Daw	(Morocco) Wydad AC	3
