= 2016 North African Tri Nations =

Tournament details
- Host: Algeria
- Date: 17–24 December 2016

Final positions
- Champions: Morocco (1st title)
- Runner-up: Tunisia
- Third place: Algeria

Tournament statistics
- Matches played: 3
- Top scorer(s): (Algeria) Johan Bensalla (21)

The 2016 North African Tri Nations (Arabic: بطولة الأمم الثلاث لشمال إفريقيا 2016) was the first annual North African Tri Nations rugby union tournament held between the national rugby union teams of Algeria, Morocco and Tunisia. The 2016 tournament was held in Oran between 17 and 24 December 2016. Morocco wins this first edition

== Venue ==
2016 North African Tri Nations is located in Algeria	Oran
2016 North African Tri Nations is located in Algeria	Ahmed Zabana Stadium
2016 North African Tri Nations is located in Algeria	Capacity: 40,000

== Fixtures ==
17 December 2016
15:00 (GMT+1)

Algeria	11–12	Morocco
Try: Youcef 79'; Con: Bensalla (0/1); Pen: Bensalla 31', 58' (2/3)	Report	Pen: Rousseau 14', 18' (2/2); Jouadat 42' (1/1); Gendre 67' (1/1)

Ahmed Zabana Stadium, Oran
Attendance: 2,500
Referee: Salem Attalah (France)

21 December 2016
15:00 (GMT+1)

Tunisia	12–14	Morocco
Pen: ?', ?', ?', ?'	Report	Try: ?'; Pen: ?', ?', ?'

Ahmed Zabana Stadium, Oran
Attendance: 100
Referee: Sylvain Mane (Senegal)

24 December 2016
15:00 (GMT+1)

Algeria	15–16	Tunisia
Pen: Bensalla ?', ?', 34', 61', 70' (5/5)	Report	Try: Chelli 79'; Pen: Chelli 18', 47', 66' (3/3)

Ahmed Zabana Stadium, Oran
Attendance: 300
Referee: Atef Yacoubi (Tunisia)

== Standings ==
Place	Nation	Games				Points			Bonus points		Table points
Place	Nation	Played	Won	Drawn	Lost	For	Against	Difference	4 Tries	7 Point Loss	Table points
1	Morocco	2	2	0	0	26	23	+3	0	0	8
2	Tunisia	2	1	0	1	28	29	-1	0	1	5
3	Algeria	2	0	0	2	26	28	−2	0	2	2
