= 2017 North African Tri Nations =

Tournament details
- Host: Morocco
- Date: 17–23 December 2017
- Teams: 3

Final positions
- Champions: Morocco
- Runner-up: Algeria
- Third place: Tunisia

Tournament statistics
- Matches played: 3
- Tries scored: 12 (4 per match)
- Attendance: 2,800 (933 per match)
- Top scorer(s): (Morocco) Chakir Hmidouche (24)

The 2017 North African Tri Nations was the second annual North African Tri Nations rugby union tournament held between the national rugby union teams of Algeria, Morocco and Tunisia. The 2017 tournament was held in Oujda between 17 and 23 December. Morocco won their second consecutive title after winning in the final against Algeria with a score of 20-13.

== Venue ==
- Stade Municipal d'Oujda, Oujda

== Fixtures ==
17 December 2017
14:30 WET (UTC+0)

Morocco	17–16	Tunisia
Try: Mehdi Benyachou 16'; Con: Chakir Hmidouche (0/1); Pen: Chakir Hmidouche (4/4) 12', 47', 70', 80+2'	Report	Try: ? 79'; Con: Chamseddine Khalifa (1/1) 80'; Pen: Chamseddine Khalifa (3/3) 2', 14', 50'

Stade Municipal d'Oujda, Oujda
Attendance: 1,000

20 December 2017
14:30 WET (UTC+0)

Algeria	36–13	Tunisia
Try: Yazid Chouchane ?'; Boris Bouhraoua ?'; Rémi Cardon 46'; Sofian Youcef 60'; Djamel Ouchene 65'; Con: Yoan Saby (3/3) ?', ?', 47'; Johan Bensalla (1/2) 61'; Pen: Yoan Saby (1/1) ?'	Report	Try: ? 43' ? 80+5'; Con: Chamseddine Khalifa (0/2); Pen: Chamseddine Khalifa (1/1) ?'

Stade Municipal d'Oujda, Oujda
Attendance: 300
Referee: Sylvain Mane (Senegal)

23 December 2017
14:30 WET (UTC+0)

Morocco	20–13	Algeria
Try: ? 45' ? 78'; Con: Chakir Hmidouche (2/2) 46', 79'; Pen: Chakir Hmidouche (2/5) 10', 42'	[ Report]	Try: Yakine Djebbari 80+5'; Con: Yoan Saby (1/1) 80+6'; Drop: Bensalla (2/2) 30', 35'

Stade Municipal d'Oujda, Oujda
Attendance: 1,500

== Standings ==
Place	Nation	Games				Points			Bonus points		Table points
Place	Nation	Played	Won	Drawn	Lost	For	Against	Difference	4 Tries	7 Point Loss	Table points
1	Morocco	2	2	0	0	37	29	+8	0	0	8
2	Algeria	2	1	0	1	49	33	+16	1	1	6
3	Tunisia	2	0	0	2	29	53	−24	0	1	1

== 2017 North African Tri Nations squads ==
=== Algeria ===
Head coach: (Algeria) Boumedienne Allam

Player	Position	Date of birth (age)	Caps	Club/province
Nasser Benamor	Prop	24 April 1978 (aged 39)	7	(France) Avenir Valencien
Mehdi Merabet	Prop	21 June 1986 (aged 31)	0	(France) USO Nevers
Rudy Rezkallah	Prop	28 August 1993 (aged 24)	1	(France) Stade Rodez Aveyron
Issam Hamel	Hooker	18 June 1997 (aged 20)	0	(France) CS Bourgoin-Jallieu
Sofian Youcef	Hooker	4 November 1990 (aged 27)	0	(France) RC Martigues Port-de-Bouc
Rabah Abdelkader	Lock	21 June 1987 (aged 30)	7	(France) Stade olympique millavois
Yakine Djebbari	Lock	16 December 1995 (aged 22)	2	(France) Rugby club suresnois
Abdel Mezdour	Lock	10 August 1981 (aged 36)	1	(France) RC Martigues Port-de-Bouc
David Medjebeur	Lock	22 January 1996 (aged 21)	0	(France) FC Grenoble B
Jonathan Best	Flanker	2 August 1983 (aged 34)	1	(France) AS Béziers Hérault
Samir Doukbi	Flanker	10 November 1985 (aged 32)	2	(France) Union sportive seynoise
Rémi Cardon	Number 8	30 January 1991 (aged 26)	1	(France) Rugby olympique de Grasse
Boris Bouhraoua	Scrum-half	4 May 1984 (aged 33)	7	(France) AC Bobigny 93 Rugby
Béranger Saieb	Scrum-half	13 February 1992 (aged 25)	1	(France) ASVEL Rugby
Yoan Saby	Fly-half	13 August 1995 (aged 22)	1	(France) FC Oloron
Johan Bensalla	Fly-half	1 April 1991 (aged 26)	4	(France) Lombez Samatan club
Mohamed Belguidoum	Centre	24 January 1994 (aged 23)	4	(Romania) CS Universitatea
Maxim Meneghini	Centre	27 November 1993 (aged 24)	3	(France) USA Limoges
Vincent Houari	Centre	12 April 1983 (aged 34)	5	(France) Rugby club Hyères CC
Lou Bouhraoua	Wing	3 November 1991 (aged 26)	7	(France) AC Bobigny 93 Rugby
Yazid Chouchane	Wing	5 April 1989 (aged 28)	6	(France) AS Bédarrides
Djamel Ouchene	Fullback	31 January 1988 (aged 29)	4	(France) US Bergerac rugby

== Statistics ==
=== Try scorers ===
1 try

- (Algeria) Yazid Chouchane
- (Algeria) Boris Bouhraoua
- (Algeria) Rémi Cardon
- (Algeria) Yakine Djebbari

1 try (cont.)

- (Algeria) Sofian Youcef
- (Algeria) Djamel Ouchene
- (Tunisia) ?
- (Tunisia) ?

1 try (cont.)

- (Tunisia) ?
- (Morocco) Mehdi Benyachou
- (Morocco) ?
- (Morocco) ?

=== Conversion scorers ===
4 conversions

- (Algeria) Yoan Saby

2 conversions

- (Morocco) Chakir Hmidouche

1 conversion

- (Algeria) Johan Bensalla
- (Tunisia) Chamseddine Khalifa

=== Penalty goal scorers ===
6 penalties

- (Morocco) Chakir Hmidouche

4 penalties

- (Tunisia) Chamseddine Khalifa

1 penalty

- (Algeria) Yoan Saby
