= Johan Bensalla =

French-Algerian rugby player (born 1991)

- Born: 1 April 1991 (age 35) France
- Height: 1.80 m (5 ft 11 in)
- Weight: 76 kg (12 st 0 lb; 168 lb)

Rugby union career
- Position(s): Scrum-half and Fly-half
- Current team: Avenir Valencien
Amateur team(s)
Years	Team	Apps	(Points)
2009–2015	AS Vauréenne	63	(67)
2015–2018	Lombez SC	54	(150)
2018–present	Avenir Valencien	6	(31)
- Correct as of 20 October 2018
International career
Years	Team	Apps	(Points)
2015–present	Algeria	7	(59)
- Correct as of 20 October 2018

Johan Bensalla (born 1 April 1991) is a French-Algerian rugby union player who currently plays for Avenir Valencien and is an Algerian international. He plays as a scrum-half and fly-half.

== Algeria ==
He got his first international cap for Algeria on 18 December 2015 against Tunisia in Oran, Algeria.

=== International matches ===
Points scored	Opponent	Location	Venue	Competition	Date	Result
11	Tunisia	Oran, Algeria	Ahmed Zabana Stadium	End-of-year rugby test series	18 December 2015	Won
6	Morocco	Oran, Algeria	Ahmed Zabana Stadium	Tri-nations maghrébin	17 December 2016	Lost
15	Tunisia	Oran, Algeria	Ahmed Zabana Stadium	Tri-nations maghrébin	24 December 2016	Lost
10	Zambia	Mufulira, Zambia	Leopards Rugby Club Stadium	Rugby Africa Bronze Cup	4 November 2017	Won
2	Tunisia	Oujda, Morocco	Stade municipal d'Oujda	Tri-nations maghrébin	20 December 2017	Won
6	Morocco	Oujda, Morocco	Stade municipal d'Oujda	Tri-nations maghrébin	23 December 2017	Lost
9	Zambia	Mufulira, Zambia	Leopards Rugby Club Stadium	Rugby Africa Silver Cup	20 October 2018	Won

== Rugby statistics ==
As of 22 October 2018

Season	Team	Games	Starts	Sub	Mins	Tries	Cons	Pens	Drops	Points	Yel	Red
2009–10	AS Vauréenne	4	0	4	33	0	0	0	0	0	0	0
2010–11	AS Vauréenne	13	10	3	674	0	0	0	1	3	0	0
2011–12	AS Vauréenne	17	5	12	488	1	0	0	0	5	0	0
2012–13	AS Vauréenne	10	4	6	430	0	4	4	0	20	0	0
2013–14	AS Vauréenne	17	7	10	697	0	6	8	1	39	0	0
2015–16	Lombez SC	17	15	2	1150	0	11	28	2	112	0	0
2016–17	Lombez SC	18	13	5	1125	2	0	3	1	22	0	0
2017–18	Lombez SC	19	15	4	1214	2	0	1	1	16	0	0
2018–19	Avenir Valencien	6	3	3	298	1	1	8	0	31	0	0
Total		123	72	51	6140	6	22	52	6	248	0	0
