= Issam Hamel =

Algerian rugby union player

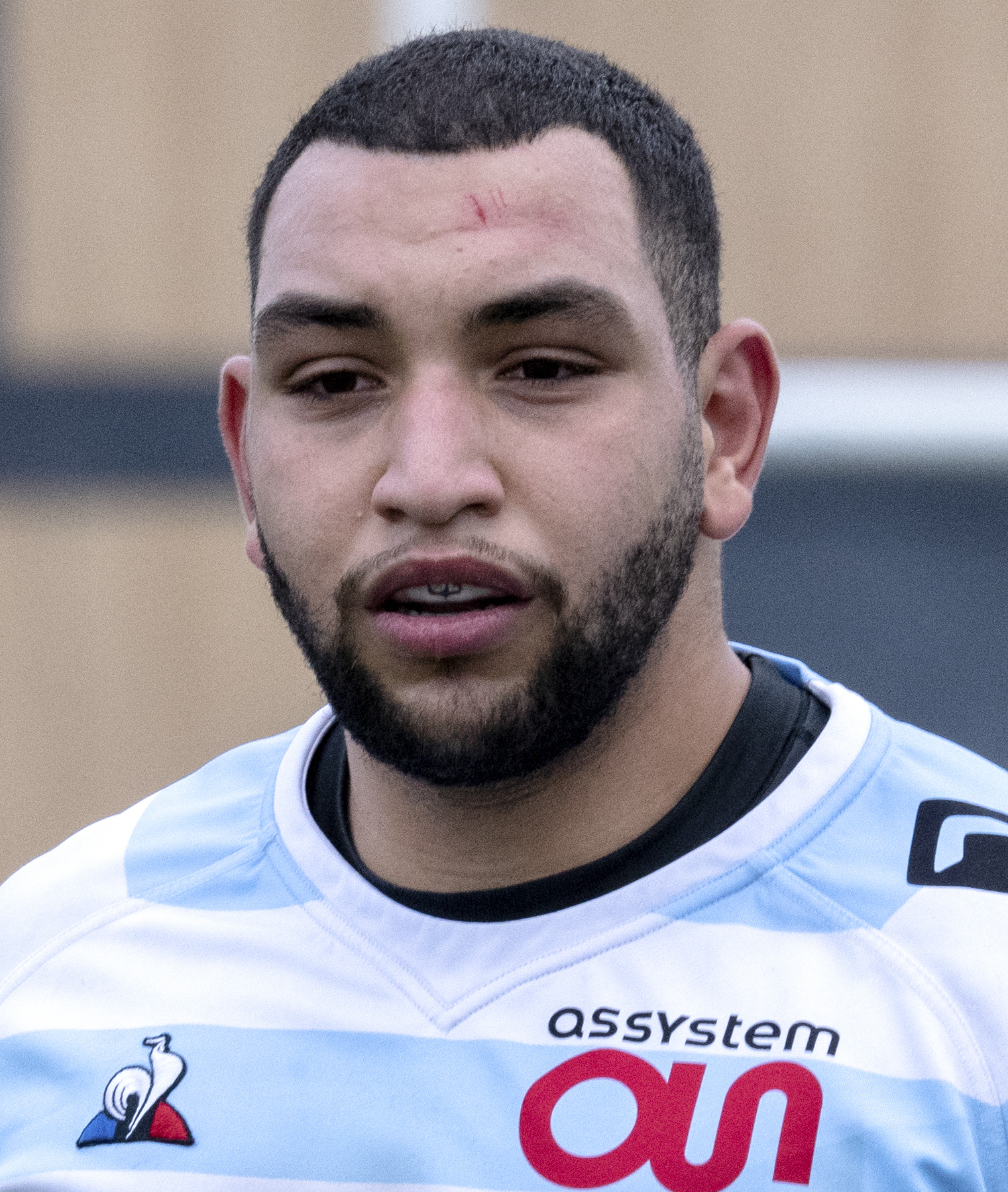
- Hamel playing for Racing 92 espoirs in 2019
- Born: 16 June 1997 (age 29) Lyon, France
- Height: 183 cm (6 ft 0 in)
- Weight: 110 kg (243 lb; 17 st 5 lb)

Rugby union career
- Position: Hooker
- Current team: CA Brive
Youth career
- 2013-2016: CS Bourgoin-Jallieu
Senior career
Years	Team	Apps	(Points)
2016-2018	CS Bourgoin-Jallieu	20	(0)
2018-2020	Racing 92	2	(0)
2020-2023	USON Nevers	83	(110)
2023-	CA Brive	11	(20)
- Correct as of 20 January 2024
International career
Years	Team	Apps	(Points)
2017-	Algeria	6	(10)
- Correct as of 20 January 2024

Issam Hamel (born 16 June 1997) is an Algerian rugby union player who plays for CA Brive in the Pro D2. He predominantly plays hooker.

== Club career ==
=== CS Bourgoin-Jallieu ===
Hamel began his career at CS Bourgoin-Jallieu joining as a cadet while at school. He made his debut for the senior side while still being part of the squads espoirs.

=== Racing 92 ===
He joined Racing in 2018 signing a 3-year contract with the Top 14 giants. However, after 2 years with only 2 appearances, totalling on 31 minutes, he left to join USON Nevers seeking more game time.

=== USON Nevers ===
He made his debut for the Pro D2 side in Round One of the 2020/21 season coming off the bench. In his first season he amassed 27 appearances only missing 3 games. In three seasons at the club he only missed 10 games, scoring 22 tries in 83 appearances.

=== CA Brive ===
In 2023, Hamel signed a two-year contract at CA Brive.

== International career ==
Hamel made his debut for the Algerian national side in 2017, featuring in a 36–13 win over Tunisia in the Maghreb Tri-nations. He featured in the squad that came 3rd in the 2022 Rugby Africa Cup.
