= ASF Fianarantsoa =

Malagasy football club

ASF
- Full name: ASF Fianarantsoa
- Ground: ?, Madagascar
- League: THB Champions League

ASF Fianarantsoa is a Malagasy football club based in Madagascar who currently plays in the Malagasy Second Division.

In 1990 the club has won the THB Champions League.

== Achievements ==
- THB Champions League: 1

1990

== Performance in CAF competitions ==
- African Cup of Champions Clubs: 1 appearance

1991 African Cup of Champions Clubs:
