= Claude Croté =

Belgian footballer (1938–2013)

Personal information
- Date of birth: 14 April 1938
- Place of birth: Namur, Belgium
- Date of death: 28 July 2013 (aged 75)
- Position: Forward

International career
| Years | Team | Apps | (Gls) |
| 1961 | Belgium | 1 | (0) |

Claude Croté (14 April 1938 – 28 July 2013) was a Belgian footballer who played as a forward. He made one appearances for the Belgium national team in 1961.
