= Karim Maroc =

Algerian footballer (born 1958)

Personal information
- Full name: Karim Maroc
- Date of birth: March 5, 1958 (age 68)
- Place of birth: Hassi El Ghella, Algeria
- Height: 1.72 m (5 ft 8 in)
- Position: Midfielder

Youth career
- 1975–1976: US Saintes

Senior career*
Years	Team	Apps	(Gls)
1976–1979	Olympique Lyonnais	48	(8)
1979–1980	Angers SCO	32	(6)
1980–1981	Olympique Lyonnais	17	(9)
1981–1982	Tours FC	32	(10)
1982–1985	Stade Brestois	88	(9)
1985–1986	Montpellier HSC	13	(1)
1986–1987	CD Logroñés	3	(0)
1988–1989	MC Oran	–	(–)

International career
1982–1986	Algeria	22	(3)

Managerial career
- 1997–2002: Algeria U20
- * Club domestic league appearances and goals

Karim Maroc (born 5 March 1958) is an Algerian former international footballer who played as a midfielder. He spent the majority of his club career in France with various clubs including Olympique Lyon and Stade Brestois. He finished his career in Oran, Algeria playing with MC Oran.

== International career ==
Maroc was a member of the Algerian national team at the 1982 FIFA World Cup in Spain and the 1986 FIFA World Cup in Mexico. He also participated in the 1986 African Cup of Nations in Egypt.

== Honours ==
- Winner of Algerian Championnat National 1988 with MC Oran
- Runner-up of the African Cup of Champions Clubs 1989 with MC Oran
