= Léon Ritzen =

Belgian footballer

Personal information
- Date of birth: 17 January 1939
- Place of birth: Genk, Belgium
- Date of death: 12 January 2018 (aged 78)
- Place of death: Bilzen, Belgium
- Position: Striker

Senior career*
Years	Team	Apps	(Gls)
1955–1965	Waterschei Thor	196	(160)
1965–1967	Racing White	42	(16)
1967–1969	Beerschot	49	(22)
1969–1971	Diest	11	(1)
Total		298	(199)

International career
1960–1968	Belgium	6	(1)
- * Club domestic league appearances and goals

Léon Ritzen (17 January 1939 – 12 January 2018) was a Belgian footballer who played for Waterschei Thor, Racing White, Beerschot, Diest and the Belgium national team, as a striker.
