= Gerard Bergholtz =

Football player and manager from the Netherlands

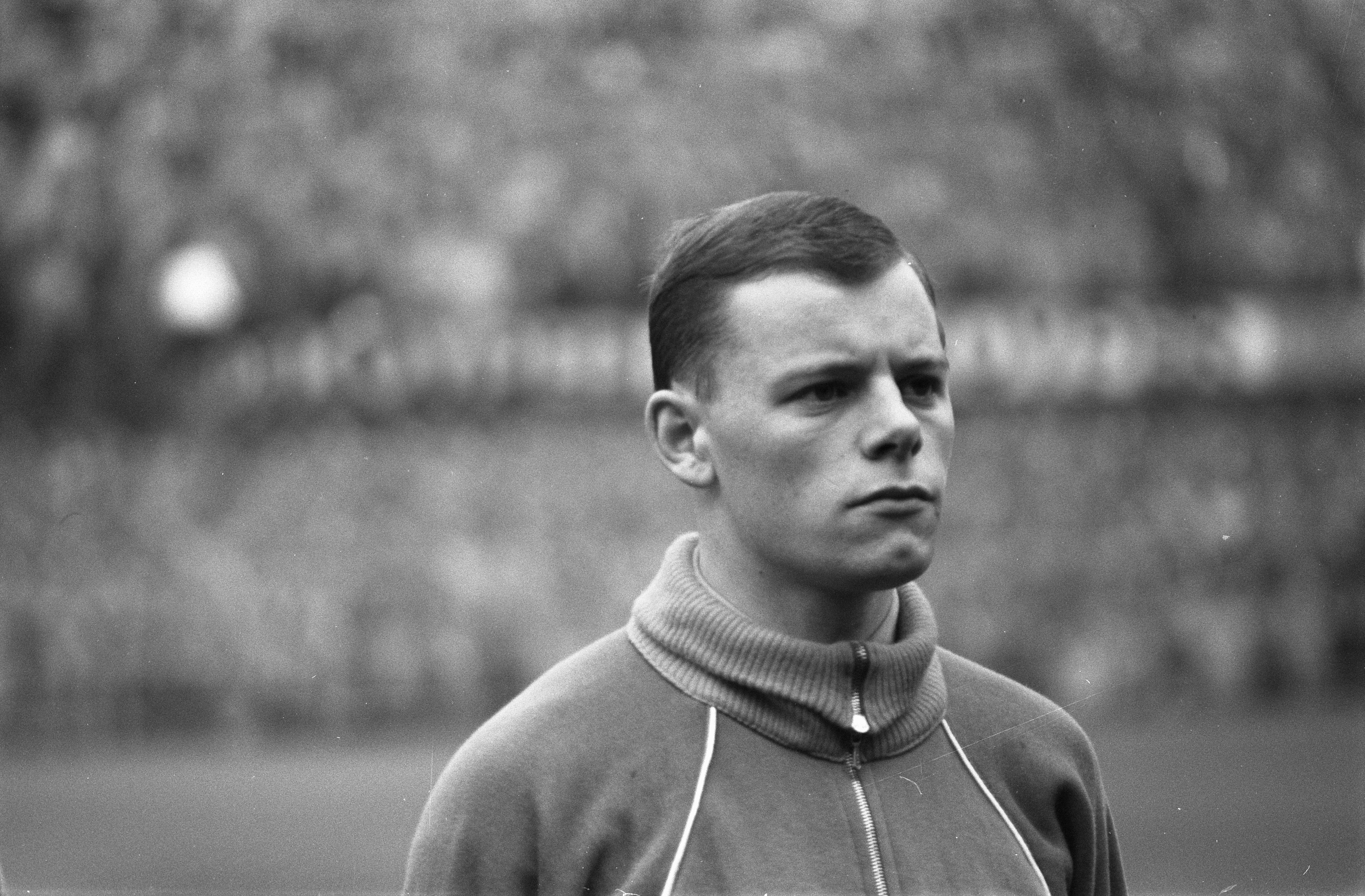
- Gerard Bergholtz in 1961

Personal information
- Full name: Gerardus Maria Catherina Henricus Bergholtz
- Date of birth: August 29, 1939 (age 87)
- Place of birth: Maastricht, Netherlands
- Position: Midfielder

Youth career
- 1955–1956: Rapid
- 1956–1957: Kimbria Maastricht

Senior career*
Years	Team	Apps	(Gls)
1957–1961	MVV	110	(24)
1961–1965	Feijenoord	101	(26)
1965–1970	Anderlecht	85	(23)
1970–1973	Racing White	70	(13)
1973–1974	RWD Molenbeek	21	(6)
1974–1976	Mons	24	(6)
Total		411	(98)

International career
1961–1967	Netherlands	12	(0)

Managerial career
- 1976–1977: Lanaken
- 1977–1979: Bilzen
- 1979–1981: Sint Truidense
- 1981–1984: Patro Eisden
- 1984–1986: Diest
- 1986–1987: AA Gent
- * Club domestic league appearances and goals

Gerard "Pummy" Bergholtz (born 29 August 1939 in Maastricht) is a retired association football player and manager from the Netherlands.

== Playing career ==
=== Club ===
He played for Rapid, Kimbria Maastricht, MVV and Feijenoord, before moving abroad to play in Belgium for Anderlecht (where he played alongside fellow Dutch international Jan Mulder), Royal Racing White, RWDM and Mons.

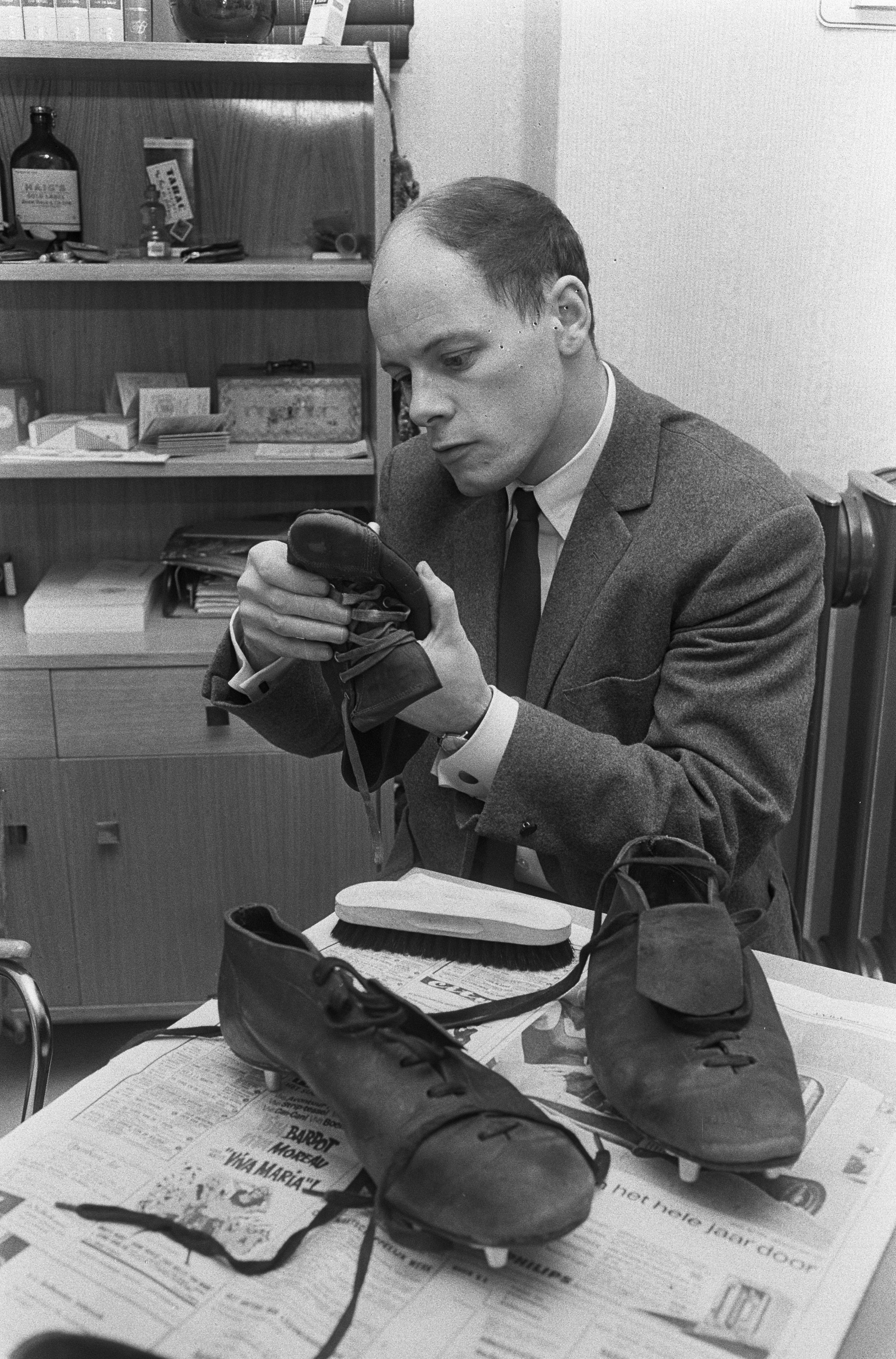
Shoe maintenance at Anderlecht, 1966

=== International ===
Bergholtz made his debut for the Netherlands in an April 1961 FIFA World Cup qualification match against Hungary an earned a total of 12 caps, scoring no goals. His final international was a May 1967 European Championship qualification match, also against Hungary.

== Managerial career ==
After retiring as a player, he coached Belgian clubs Lanaken, Bilzen, STVV, Patro Eisden, Diest and AA Gent.

== Career statistics ==
Appearances and goals by national team and year
National team	Year	Apps	Goals
Netherlands	1961	2	0
Netherlands	1963	1	0
Netherlands	1964	6	0
Netherlands	1965	2	0
Netherlands	1967	1	0
Total		12	0

== Honours ==
=== Player ===
Feyenoord

- Eredivisie: 1961–62, 1964–65

Anderlecht

- Belgian First Division: 1965–66, 1966–67, 1967–68

=== Manager ===
Bilzen

- Belgian Fourth Division: 1977–78

Patro Eisden

- Belgian Fourth Division: 1981–82
- Belgian Third Division: 1983–84
