= Dar Alryada =

Multi-use stadium in Omdurman, Sudan

Coordinates: 15°37′24.9″N 32°28′38.9″E

Dar Alryada Omdurman Stadium (Arabic: دار الرياضة أم درمان) (English: House of Sport Omdurman) is a multi-use stadium in Omdurman, Sudan. It is currently used mostly for football matches and is the home of Al-Mourada football club. The stadium has a capacity of 14,000 people.
