= Delegado Da Cunha =

Brazilian politician (born 1977)

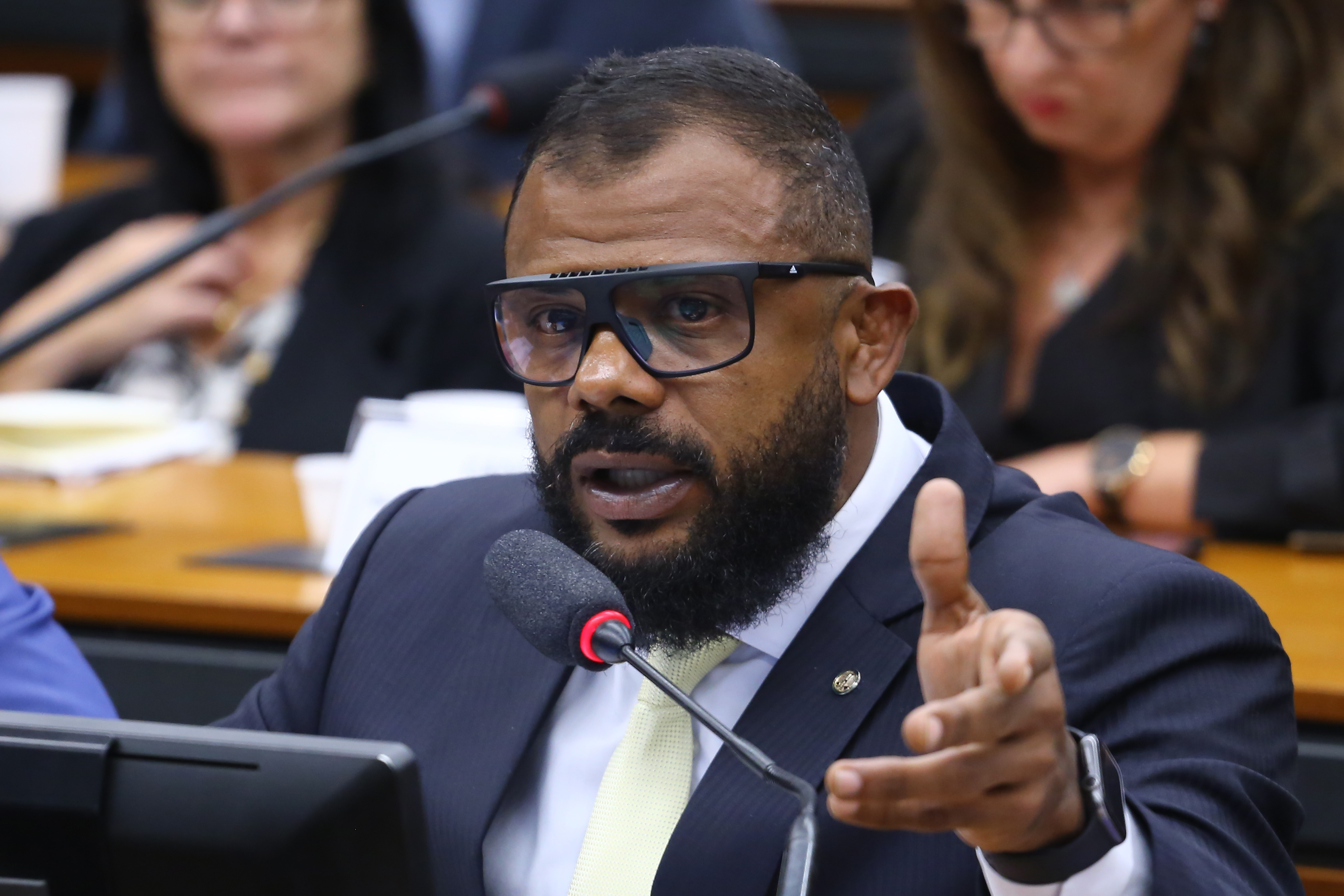
- Da Cunha in 2023

Member of the Chamber of Deputies
- Incumbent
- Assumed office 1 February 2023
- Constituency: São Paulo

Personal details
- Born: 14 October 1977 (age 48) Santos
- Party: União Brasil (since 2026)
- Education: Catholic University of Santos

Carlos Alberto da Cunha (born 14 October 1977 in Santos), better known as Delegado Da Cunha, is a Brazilian politician serving as a member of the Chamber of Deputies since 2023. He previously worked as a police officer.
