= Mustapha Boukar =

Algerian footballer (born 1962)

Personal information
- Full name: Mustapha Boukar
- Date of birth: 2 November 1962 (age 63)
- Place of birth: Oran, Algeria
- Position: Midfielder

Youth career
- 1977–1980: MC Oran

Senior career*
Years	Team	Apps	(Gls)
1980–1982	MC Oran	–	(–)
1982–1990	ASM Oran	–	(–)
1990–1993	KVK Westhoek	–	(–)
1993–1995	Eendracht Wervik	–	(–)
1995–1997	ASM Oran	–	(–)

International career
1985–1988	Algeria	8	(2)
1989	Algeria futsal	3	(0)
- * Club domestic league appearances and goals

Mustapha Boukar (Arabic: مصطفى بوكار; born 2 November 1962) is an Algerian former footballer who famously played as a number 10 for ASM Oran, the club of the town where he was born. He was nicknamed Paulo César referring to the Brazilian player of the 1970s who was also known as Caju. Boukar played in Belgium between 1991 and 1993.

He taked part to the 1989 FIFA Futsal World Championship helds in the Netherlands.

== Honours ==
- Runners-up of the Algerian Cup with ASM Oran in 1983
