= Soheyl Jaoudat =

American rugby union player

- Born: 30 September 1991 (age 35) Clermont-Ferrand, France
- Height: 5 ft 8 in (1.73 m)
- Weight: 168 lb (76 kg)

Rugby union career
- Position(s): Full back, Wing, Scrum half
Youth career
- 2016-2018: Clermont Auvergne
Senior career
Years	Team	Apps	(Points)
2019	Austin Elite	15	(20)
2019-present	CS Beaune		
International career
Years	Team	Apps	(Points)
2016-	Morocco	10	
National sevens team
Years	Team		Comps
2016-	Morocco		

Soheyl Jaoudat (born 30 September 1991) is a Moroccan professional rugby union player. He plays as a centre for Rugby United New York in Major League Rugby, previously playing at centre and fly half for the Austin Elite in Major League Rugby.
