= North African Tri Nations =

- Current season or competition: 2017 North African Tri Nations
- Sport: Rugby union
- Instituted: 2016
- Countries: Algeria; Morocco; Tunisia
- Holders: Morocco (2017)
- Most titles: Morocco (2 titles)

The North African Tri Nations (Arabic: بطولة الأمم الثلاث لشمال إفريقيا) is an annual rugby union tournament involving nations from North Africa, organised by Rugby Africa, under hospices of World Rugby. Morocco won this first edition.

== History ==
The tournament was first held in December 2016 organized by the Algerian Rugby Federation in collaboration with Rugby Africa grouping Algeria, Morocco and Tunisia. World Rugby has validated it, and the event take place at Oran, Algeria.

== Results ==
=== Tournaments ===
Below is a list of previous tournaments results:

Year	Venue	Winner	Score	Runner-up	Third place
2016	(Algeria) Oran	Morocco	^{n/a}	Tunisia	Algeria
2017	(Morocco) Oujda	Morocco	^{n/a}	Algeria	Tunisia
2018	Tunisia	Not held			

^n/a A round-robin tournament determined the final standings.

=== Team records ===
The overall record of the teams are as follows:

Team	Champions	Runners-up	Third place
Morocco	2 (2016, 2017)		
Tunisia		1 (2016)	1 (2017)
Algeria		1 (2017)	1 (2016)

=== Performance of nations ===
Team	2016	2017	2018
Algeria	3rd	2nd	
Morocco	1st	1st	
Tunisia	2nd	3rd	

Legend

- 1st — Champions
- 2nd — Runners-up
- 3rd — Third place
- • — withdrew
- — Hosts
