= Salif Diagne =

Senegalese footballer

Personal information
- Full name: El Hadj Salif Diagne
- Place of birth: Senegal
- Position: Forward

Youth career
- –: Niayes de Pikine

Senior career*
Years	Team	Apps	(Gls)
–	Niayes de Pikine		
–	Seib Diourbel		
–	ASC Jeanne d'Arc		
1987-1990	Raja CA		
–	MAS Fez		

International career
1980–????	Senegal		
- * Club domestic league appearances and goals

Salif Diagne is a Senegalese former football forward who played for the Senegal national team.

== Honours ==
=== Clubs ===
Raja CA

- CAF Champions League (1): 1989

=== International ===
- Africa Cup of Nations: Group stage in 1986
