= JAC (football club) =

JAC Port-Gentil
- Full name: Jeunesse Athlétique Club de Port-Gentil
- Founded: 2012
- Ground: Stade Pierre Claver Divounguy; Port-Gentil, Gabon
- Capacity: 7,000
- League: Gabon Championnat National D2

The Jeunesse Athlétique Club de Port-Gentil or simply JAC Port-Gentil is a Gabonese football club based in Port-Gentil, Ogooué-Maritime province. They play in the Gabon Championnat National D2.

== History ==
The club was named on past as AS OPRAG Port-Gentil. In 1989, it change the name to JAC Port-Gentil. In 1990 the team has won the Gabon Championnat National D1.

== Achievements ==
- Gabon Championnat National D1: 1

1990

== Stadium ==
Currently the team plays at the Stade Pierre Claver Divounguy.
