= Ali Benhalima =

Algerian footballer (born 1962)

Personal information
- Date of birth: 21 January 1962 (age 64)
- Place of birth: Oran, Algeria
- Position: Defender

Youth career
- FC Oran

Senior career*
Years	Team	Apps	(Gls)
1980–1988	ASM Oran		
1988–1990	MC Oran		
1990–1993	Lleida	77	(7)

International career
1986–1992	Algeria	26	(1)
- * Club domestic league appearances and goals

Ali Benhalima (born 21 January 1962) is an Algerian former professional footballer who played as a defender.

== Honours ==
ASC Oran

- Algerian Cup runner-up: 1981, 1983

MC Oran

- Algerian Championnat National runner-up: 1990
- African Cup of Champions Clubs runner-up: 1989

Lleida

- Liga Adelante: 1993

Algeria

- Africa Cup of Nations: 1990; third place 1988
- Afro-Asian Cup of Nations: 1991
